= List of Irish women writers =

This is a list of women writers who were born in Ireland or whose writings are closely associated with that country.

== A ==
- Mary Jane Adams (1840–1902), Irish-American poet
- Cecil Frances Alexander (1818–1895), Anglo-Irish hymn writer and poet
- Eleanor Jane Alexander (1857–1939), poet and novelist
- Deborah Alcock (1835–1913), historical novelist, memoirist
- Cecelia Ahern (born 1981), novelist, short story writer
- Liz Allen (born 1969), investigative journalist, best selling novelist
- Colette Nic Aodha (born 1967), poet
- Karen Ardiff, Irish playwright and novelist
- Geraldine Aron (born 1951), playwright
- Mary Arrigan (born 15 February 1943), illustrator, artist and novelist
- Sarah Atkinson (1823–1893), biographer, essayist, philanthropist

== B ==
- Mary Barber (c.1685–c.1755), successful poet, author of Poems on several occasions
- Leland Bardwell (1928–2016), poet, novelist, playwright
- Alex Barclay, pseudonym of Yve Williams, (born 1974), journalist and crime writer
- Jane Barlow (1857–1917), poet, novelist
- Margaret Barrington (1896–1982), short story writer, essayist
- Samantha Barry (born c.1981), journalist, editor
- Eileen Battersby (c.1958–2018), literary critic
- Henrietta Battier (c.1751–1813), poet, satirist, actress
- Sara Baume (born 1984), novelist
- Annie O'Meara de Vic Beamish, (1886–1969), novelist, playwright, translator
- Louisa Beaufort (1781–1863), antiquarian, writer and artist
- Emily Elizabeth Shaw Beavan, (1818–1897), poet
- Mary Beckett (1926–2013), playwright for radio, short story writer, children's writer
- Louie Bennett (1870–1956), suffragette, journalist and novelist
- Tara Bergin (born 1974), poet
- Sara Berkeley (born 1967), poet
- Maeve Binchy (1939–2012), novelist, playwright, short story writer, columnist
- E. Owens Blackburne (1848–1894), pen name writer and novelist, Elizabeth Casey
- Marguerite Gardiner, Countess of Blessington (1789–1849), novelist, essayist, letter writer
- Gertrude Elizabeth Blood (1857–1911), journalist, writer, playwright and editor
- Eavan Boland (1944–2020), poet, non-fiction writer
- Angela Bourke (born 1952), writer, historian, interested in folklore
- Eva Bourke, German-born Irish poet since c.1985
- Elizabeth Bowen (1899–1973), novelist, short story writer, author of Eva Trout
- Sarah Bowie, Irish illustrator and writer
- Clare Boylan (1948–2006), journalist, critic, novelist, short story writer
- Hilary Boyle (1899–1988), journalist, broadcaster, and activist
- Éilís Ní Bhrádaigh (1927–2007), writer and lexicographer
- Deirdre Brennan (born 1934), bilingual poet, short-story writer and playwright
- Maeve Brennan (1917–1993), short story writer, journalist, from 1934 in the United States
- Sarah Rees Brennan (born 1983), young adult novelist
- Máire Bradshaw (born 1943), poet and publisher
- Teresa Brayton (1868–1943), poet, contributed to American newspapers
- Charlotte Brooke (c.1740–1793), writer, translator of Irish-language poetry
- Mary Brück (1925–2008), astronomer, science historian
- Catherine Dorothea Burdett (1784–1861), novelist
- Patricia Burke Brogan (fl. 1990s), playwright and poet
- Charlotte Brooke (c.1740–1793), poet, author of Reliques of Irish Poetry
- Mary Bonaventure Browne (17th century), nun, abbess, historian
- Frances Browne (1816–1879), poet, novelist, children's writer
- Colette Bryce (born 1970), poet
- Ann Buckley (fl. 1990s), musicologist, non-fiction writer
- Selina Bunbury (1802–1882), prolific novelist
- Anne Burke (fl.1780–1805), was an Irish novelist in the Gothic genre
- Patricia Burke Brogan (1926–2022), playwright, novelist, poet, artist
- Catherine Byron (born 1947), poet

== C ==
- June Caldwell (born c. 1970), journalist, short story writer
- Margaret Callan (c. 1817–c. 1883), teacher, nationalist, writer, used the pseudonym Thornton MacMahon
- Caitilin Dubh (fl. c. 1624), early poet, wrote elegies
- Moya Cannon (born 1956), poet, journal editor
- Ethna Carbery (1866–1902), poet, journalist, short story writer
- Mary Birkett Card (1774–1817), Abolitionist and feminist poet
- Amy Carmichael (1867–1951), missionary, many works on her work in India
- Orlaith Carmody (born 1960), businesswoman, writer and news reporter
- Marina Carr (born 1964), playwright
- Austin Carroll (1835–1909), nun and writer, emigrated to United States
- Claudia Carroll (born c. 1969), best-selling author
- Anne-Marie Casey (born 1965), screenwriter, novelist
- Agnes Castle (c.1860–1922), novelist, playwright and short story writer
- Anne Chambers, since 2007, novelist, screenwriter, biographer
- Maureen Charlton (1930–2007), playwright, poet and broadcaster
- Anna Maria Chetwode (fl. 1827), novelist
- Lana Citron (born 1969) writer
- Josephine Fitzgerald Clarke (1865–1953), Irish romance novelist
- Maude Clarke (1892–1935), historian
- Agnes Mary Clerke (1842–1907), astronomer, writer
- Eliza Dorothea Cobbe, Lady Tuite (c. 1764–1850), poet and children's writer
- Frances Power Cobbe (1822–1904), writer and suffragist
- Patricia Cockburn (1914–1989), journalist and artist
- Mary Colum (1884–1957), literary critic, memoirist
- Helena Concannon (1878–1952), historian, non-fiction writer, politician
- Evelyn Conlon (born 1952), novelist, short story writer
- Marita Conlon-McKenna (born 1956), children's writer, author of Under the Hawthorn Tree
- Susan Connolly (born 1956), poet
- Susan E. Connolly (c. 1970), fiction and non fiction writer
- June Considine (born 1945), children's writer and novelist
- Dorothea Conyers (1869–1949), romantic novelist
- Melosina Lenox-Conyngham (1941–2011), columnist and writer
- Roz Cowman (born 1942), poet
- Mary Costello (fl. 2010s), short story writer, novelist
- Ethna Byrne-Costigan (1904–1991) writer and academic
- Emily Crawford (1841–1915), journalist
- Mabel Sharman Crawford (1820–1912), an Irish adventurer, feminist and writer
- Isabella Valancy Crawford (1846–1887), Irish-born Canadian poet, short story writer, novelist
- Máirín Cregan (1891–1975), nationalist and writer
- Elizabeth Christitch (1861–January 26, 1933) Irish journalist, writer, poet, translator and Serbian patriot
- Bithia Mary Croker (1848–1920), novelist
- May Crommelin (1850–1930), novelist, travel writer
- Sarah Crossan (fl. 2010s), young adult writer
- Julia Crottie (1853–about 1930), novelist and short story writer
- Catherine Ann Cullen, Irish poet
- Majella Cullinane (fl. 2010s), novelist, poet, now in New Zealand
- Geraldine Cummins (1890–1969), spiritualist, novelist and playwright
- Judi Curtin, Irish children's writer
- Margaret Anna Cusack (1829–1899), nun, novelist, biographer, non-fiction writer, poet
- Sidney Czira (1889–1974), journalist, broadcaster, writer and revolutionary

== D ==
- Emma Dabiri author, academic, and broadcaster
- Ita Daly (born 1945), novelist and short story writer
- Mary E. Daly (fl. 1980s), historian
- Mildred Darby (1867–1932), novelist
- Ailbhe Darcy (born 1981), poet
- Suzanne R. Day (1876–1964), feminist, playwright and novelist
- Mildred Darby (1867–1932), Gothic novelist and owner of Leap Castle
- Annabel Davis-Goff (born 1942), memoirist, novelist, reviewer, now in the United States
- Mary Davys (1674–1732), novelist, playwright, author of The Reform'd Coquet
- Suzanne R. Day (1876–1964), feminist, novelist and playwright
- Alice Dease (1874–1949), novelist
- Charlotte Dease (1873–1953), prayer collector and writer
- Denise Deegan (born 1966), screenwriter and young adult writer
- Teresa Deevy (1894–1963), playwright, short story writer, also wrote for radio
- Martina Devlin, award-winning columnist and best selling novelist
- Polly Devlin (born 1944), novelist, short story writer, broadcaster
- Éilís Ní Dhuibhne (born 1954), novelist, short story writer, children's writer, playwright, writes in Irish and English
- Máirín Diamond (born 1957), poet
- Eilís Dillon (1920–1994), children's writer, historical novelist, wrote in Irish and English
- Lady Margaret Domville (1840–9 January 1929), Irish aristocrat and writer
- Emma Donoghue (born 1969), playwright, historian, novelist, now living in Canada, author of Room
- Aoife Dooley (born 1991), writer, illustrator and graphic designer
- Mary Dorcey (born 1950), short story writer, poet, novelist
- Ellen Mary Patrick Downing, poet
- Mary Downing (c. 1815–1881), poet and nationalist
- Catharine Drew (1832–1910), journalist
- Nora Dryhurst (1856–1930), nationalist and writer
- Dorothea Du Bois (1728–1774), musical entertainment writer
- Ruth Dudley Edwards (born 1944), crime fiction novelist, journalist, broadcaster
- Bella Duffy, (1849–1926), writer and translator
- Bernie Dwyer (1943–2013), journalist

== E ==
- Charlotte O'Conor Eccles (1860–1911), novelist, short story writer, columnist
- Frances Anne Edgeworth (1769–1865), memoirist, botanical artist
- Maria Edgeworth (1768–1849), novelist, children's writer, author of The Purple Jar
- George Egerton, pen name of Mary Chavelita Dunne Bright (1859–1945), short story writer, novelist, playwright, translator
- Olivia Elder (1735–1780), poet
- Marianne Elliott (born 1948), historian
- Anne Enright (born 1962), essayist, short story writer, novelist, non-fiction writer
- Erminda Rentoul Esler (c. 1852–1924), novelist, short story writer
- Elsa d'Esterre-Keeling (1857–1935), novelist
- Martina Evans (born 1961), poet and novelist

== F ==
- Elaine Feeney (born 1979), poet
- Mrs. E. M. Field(1856–1940), children and historical
- N. P. Figgis (1939–2014), archaeologist and author
- Sarah Mary Fitton (c. 1796–1874), writer interested in botany
- Barbara Fitzgerald (1911–1982), novelist
- Kitty Fitzgerald (born September 25, 1946), writer, poet, playwright
- Theodora FitzGibbon (1916–1991), cookbook writer, novelist, actress
- Marie-Louise Fitzpatrick (born 1962), novelist, children's writer, illustrator
- Patricia Forde (born c. 1960), children's writer
- Anne Marie Forrest (born 1967), widely translated novelist
- Ellen Forrester (1828–1883), nationalist and poet
- Lydia Mary Foster (1867–1943), writer and novelist
- Lorraine Francis (born 1958), children's writer
- M. E. Francis (1859–1930), novelist
- Celia de Fréine (born 1948), poet, playwright, screenwriter, librettist, writing in Irish and English
- Katy French (1983–2007), model, television personality, columnist
- Tana French (born 1973), novelist, actress, author of In the Woods
- Sarah Mary Fitton (c. 1796–1874), botanist, non-fiction writer, children's writer
- Anne Fuller (died 1790), novelist in the Gothic genre
- Alice Furlong (1866–1946), poet, feminist, wrote in English and Irish

== G ==
- Gertrude Gaffney (died 1959), journalist
- Maureen Gaffney (born 1947), psychologist, non-fiction writer
- Margaret Gallagher (fl. 1970s), writer specializing in gender and media
- Miriam Gallagher (1940–2018), plays, scripts, books, stories
- Evie Gaughan (born 1976), writer and artist
- Ruth Gilligan (born 1988), best selling novelist
- Dr. Maude Glasgow (1876–1955), early pioneer in public health and preventative medicine as well as an activist for equal rights.
- Lady Blanche Girouard (1898–1940), writer
- Eva Gore-Booth (1870–1926), poet, playwright, feminist
- Clotilde Graves (1863–1932), novelist and playwright
- Ida Margaret Graves Poore (1859–1941), writer and poet
- Áine Greaney (c. 1962), writer and editor
- Alice Stopford Green (1847–1929), historian and nationalist
- Sarah Green (fl.1790–1825), Irish-English novelist
- Augusta, Lady Gregory (1852–1932), playwright, folk story writer, poet, memoirist, travelled widely
- Frances Greville (c 1724–1789), poet, social celebrity
- Constantia Grierson (c.1705–1732), editor, poet, classical scholar
- Sarah Maria Griffin (born c. 1988), Irish writer and poet
- Elizabeth Griffith (1727–1793), playwright, novelist, essayist, translator
- Beatrice Grimshaw (1870–1953), novelist, travel writer
- Vona Groarke (born 1964), poet
- Isabel Grubb (1881–1972), historian
- Veronica Guerin (1958–1996), journalist
- Althea Gyles (1868–1949), poet, artist

== H ==
- Anna Maria Hall (1800–1881), playwright, novelist, short story writerist
- C. J. Hamilton, (1841–1935) novelist and journalist
- Marianne-Caroline Hamilton (1777–1861), artist and memoirist
- Emma Hannigan (1972–2018), novelist, memoirist
- Kerry Hardie (born 1951), poet and novelist
- Elizabeth Hardy (1794–1854), novelist
- Nancy Harris, successful playwright since c. 2012
- Anne Le Marquand Hartigan (1931–2022), poet, playwright, painter
- Johanna Harwood (born 1930), screenwriter
- Anne Haverty (born 1959), novelist and poet
- Mary Hayden (1862–1942), historian, Irish-language and women's rights activist
- Annie French Hector, 'Mrs. Alexander' (1825–1902), popular novelist
- Barbara Hemphill (died 1858), novelist
- Claire Hennessy (born 1986), young adult novelist
- Dorothea Herbert (c. 1767–1829), diarist, poet
- Marie Herbert (born 1941), adventurer and author
- Sarah Herbert (1824–1846), Irish-Nova Scotian author, publisher and educator
- Jane Emily Herbert (1821–1882), acclaimed poet
- Emily Henrietta Hickey (1845–1923), poet, writer on religion, translator
- Elizabeth Hickey (1917–1999), historian
- Mary Agnes Hickson (1821–1899), historian
- F. E. Higgins, pen name of Fiona Higgins, novelist since 2007
- Rita Ann Higgins (born 1955), poet, playwright
- Pamela Hinkson (1900–1982), novelist
- Mary Hobhouse (1864–1901), poet, novelist
- Mary Anne Holmes (1773–1805), poet
- Norah Hoult (1898–1984), novelist and short story writer
- Caoilinn Hughes (fl. 2010s), novelist, short story writer
- Margaret Wolfe Hungerford (1855–1897), popular novelist, short story writer
- Arlene Hunt (born 1972), crime fiction novelist

== J ==
- Rosamund Jacob (1888–1960), diarist, novelist
- Anna Brownell Jameson (1794–1860), Irish-born British non-fiction writer, essayist
- Biddy Jenkinson (born 1949), Irish-language poet, short story writer and dramatist
- Rosemary Jenkinson (born 1967), poet, playwright and short story writer
- Jennifer Johnston (1930–2025), novelist, author of How Many Miles to Babylon?
- Lauren-Shannon Jones (born c. 1989), horror playwright and performer
- Kate Jordan (1862–1926), Irish-American novelist and playwright
- Ann Henning Jocelyn (born 1948), writer, playwright and translator

== K ==
- Julia Kavanagh (1824–1877), children's writer, novelist, stories mainly based in France
- Rose Kavanagh (1860–1891), newspaper editor, columnist, poet
- Úna-Minh Kavanagh (born 1991), journalist, travel writer
- Anna Kelly (1891–1958), journalist and the first women's page editor in Ireland
- Molly Keane (1904–1996), novelist and playwright
- Cathy Kelly (born 1966), journalist, widely translated women's fiction novelist
- Maeve Kelly (1930–2025), novelist, short story writer, poet
- Mary Eva Kelly (1826–1910), poet, emigrated to Australia
- Rita Kelly (born 1953), poet, writing in Irish and English
- Sonya Kelly playwright
- Mary Olivia Kennedy (1880–1943), journalist
- Marian Keyes (born 1963), successful novelist, non-fiction writer, works widely translated
- Molly Keane (1904–1996), novelist, playwright
- Paula Keane (born 1977), novelist and short story writer
- Celine Kiernan (born 1967), young adult novelist, children's writer
- Carla King (fl. 2000s), historian
- Margaret King (1773–1835), children's writer, non-fiction works
- Elaine Kinsella (fl. 2000s), radio dramatist
- Olivia Knight (1830–1908), poet, essayist, columnist, from 1860 in to Australia
- Kathleen Knox (1847–1930), Irish author and poet who used the pen name Edward Kane in later life

== L ==
- May Laffan (1849–1916), novelist
- Margaret Rebecca Lahee (1831–1895), Irish Lancashire dialect writer from the 19th century
- Caitriona Lally (fl. 2018), novelist
- Elish Lamont (c.1800–1870), artist, writer and poet
- Lathóg of Tír Chonaill (9th century), poet
- Rosamond Langbridge (1880–1964), novelist, playwright, poet
- Maura Laverty (1907–1966), novelist, short story writer, journalist, broadcaster
- Mary Lavin (1912–1996), pioneering novelist, short story writer
- Emily Lawless (1845–1913), novelist, poet, biographer, historian
- Alice Lawrenson (1841–1900), gardener
- Sybil le Brocquy (1892–1973), playwright and conservationist
- Mary Leadbeater (1758–1826), poet, short story writer, biographer, letter writer
- Ada Leask (1899–1987), historian
- Alicia Sheridan Le Fanu (1753–1817), playwright, published only one play: The Sons of Erin; Or, Modern Sentiment
- Sarah Leech (1809–1830), poet
- Alicia LeFanu (1791–1867), poet, novelist
- Elizabeth Emmet Lenox-Conyngham (1800–1889), poet
- Mae Leonard poet, broadcaster, short story writer
- Mary Isabel Leslie (1899–1978), known as Temple Lane, novelist
- Sybil le Brocquy (1892–1973)
- June Levine (1931–2008), journalist, novelist, feminist writer
- Liadain (7th century), poet
- J.S. Anna Liddiard (1773–1819), romantic poet
- Ruth Frances Long (born 1971), novelist, young adult writer
- Margracia Loudon (c.1788–1860), novelist and political author
- Hannah Lynch (1859–1904), Irish novelist, journalist and translator
- Patricia Lynch (1894–1972), children's writer, journalist, short story writer
- Philomena Lynott (1930–2019), memoirist
- Genevieve Lyons (1930–2018), actress, novelist, educator
- Constance Lloyd (1858 – 1898), wife of Oscar Wilde, suffragist, journalist, playwright, and a dress reform activist

== M ==
- Catherine Maberly (1805–1875) Irish writer
- Aifric Mac Aodha (born 1979), poet
- Dorothy Macardle (1889–1958), novelist, playwright, historian
- Bridget G. MacCarthy (1904–1993), literary historian
- Ethna MacCarthy (1903–1959), poet
- Mary Stanislaus MacCarthy (1849–1897), nun, poet
- Doireann MacDermott (1923–2024), translator, philologist, non-fiction writer
- Marisa Mackle (born c.1973), novelist
- Eleanor MacMahon (1864–1956), romance novelist
- Kathleen MacMahon, journalist and novelist
- Charlotte Elizabeth MacManus (1850–1941), novelist
- Máire MacNeill (1904–1987), journalist, folklorist, translator
- Catherine Mary MacSorley (1848–1929), children's writer for girls, religious works
- Marie MacSweeney, poet, shortstories
- Máire MacSwiney Brugha (1918–2012), activist and writer
- Audrey Magee (active since 2000), novelist
- Bríd Mahon (1922–2008), novelist and folklorist
- Catherine Gray, Lady Manners (1766–1852), poet
- Mary Manning (1905–1999), novelist, playwright and film critic
- Alicia Catherine Mant (1788–1869), children's writer
- Harriet Evans Martin (died 1846), Anglo-Irish novelist, non-fiction writer
- Harriet Letitia Martin (1801–1891), novelist
- Mary Letitia Martin (1815–1850), novelist
- Violet Florence Martin (1862–1915), novelist, co-authored works with Edith Somerville
- Mary Mathew (1724–1777), diarist
- Caitlín Maude (1941–1982), poet, teacher, actress, singer, wrote in Irish
- Constantia Maxwell (1886–1962), historian
- Joan McBreen (born 1947), poet
- Eimear McBride (born 1976), novelist, author of A Girl Is a Half-formed Thing
- Kate McCabe (fl. 2005), novelist
- Felicity McCall, journalist, playwright since c.2004
- Nell McCafferty (1944–2024), journalist, playwright, feminist
- Justine McCarthy (fl. 2000s), journalist
- Mary McCarthy (1951–2013), successful novelist
- Letitia McClintock (1835–1917), writer and folklorist
- Jenny McCudden, since c.2010, journalist, short story writer, poet
- Mary McDermott (fl. 1832), poet
- Mary McDonagh (1849–?), poet
- Rosaleen McDonagh (fl. 2000s), activist and playwright
- Paula McGrath (born 1966), novelist
- Medbh McGuckian (born 1950), Northern-Irish poet, literary writer
- Maura McHugh (fl. 2000s), writer of horror novels, plays, comic books and short stories
- Lisa McInerney (born 1981), novelist, short story writer, blogger
- Pauline McLynn (born 1962), actress, novelist
- Liz McManus (born 1947), politician, novelist
- Janet McNeill (1907–1994), novelist, playwright and children's writer
- Anna McPartlin (born 1972), novelist
- Dervla McTiernan (born c.1977), crime novelist
- L. T. Meade, pen name of Elizabeth Thomasina Meade Smith (1844–1914), prolific young adult and children's writer, mainly for girls, wrote over 300 books
- Norah Meade (1888–1954), journalist
- Roisin Meaney, Irish novelist
- A. Garland Mears (1842–1920), novelist
- Paula Meehan (born 1955), poet, playwright
- Máighréad Medbh (born 1959), poet
- A. L. Mentxaka (active since 2000s), playwright, critic, educator
- Máire Mhac an tSaoi (1922–2021), acclaimed Irish-language scholar, poet, translator
- Betty Miller (1910–1965), novelist, non-fiction writer, biographer, columnist
- Alice Milligan (1865–1953), acclaimed poet
- Anna Millikin (fl. 1793–1810) Gothic novelist
- Lia Mills (fl. 1990s), novelist, short story writer
- Susan L. Mitchell (1866–1926), poet, known for her satirical verse
- Dorothy Molloy (1942–2004), poet, journalist and artist
- Frances Molloy (1947–1991), novelist
- Mary Monck (c. 1677–1715), poet
- Sydney, Lady Morgan (1781–1859), poet, novelist, author of The Wild Irish Girl
- Sinead Moriarty (born c. 1971), novelist
- Sinéad Morrissey (born 1972), poet
- Kathleen Mulchrone (1895–1973), Irish Celtic scholar, writer
- Rosa Mulholland (1841–1921), prolific novelist, poet, playwright, biographer
- Val Mulkerns (1925–2018)), novelist, journalist, columnist, broadcaster
- Sheila Mulloy (1922–2013), historian
- Margaret Mulvihill (born 1954), novelist and non-fiction writer
- Iris Murdoch (1919–1999), Irish-born successful British novelist, philosopher, author of Under the Net
- Agnes G. Murphy (1865–1931), Irish journalist and writer
- C.E. Murphy (born 1973), American-born writer living in Ireland, writing using Irish mythology
- Dervla Murphy (1931–2022), touring cyclist, travel writer
- Elaine Murphy, playwright since c. 2008
- Kathleen M. Murphy (died 1963), poet
- Maura Murphy (1928–2005), autobiographer
- Nora J Murray (1888–1955), poet, short story writer, school teacher

== N ==
- Angela Nagle (born 1984), non-fiction writer
- Mary Nash (born 1947), historian
- Kate Newmann (born 1965), poet and small press founder
- Cláir Ní Aonghusa (born 1953), novelist, poet
- Eibhlín Ní Bhriain (1925–1986), Irish-language journalist
- Síle Ní Chéileachair (1924–1985), Irish-language short story writer
- Dairena Ní Chinnéide (born 1969), poet and short story writer
- Caitríona Ní Chléirchín (fl. 2010), poet
- Eibhlín Dubh Ní Chonaill (c. 1743–c. 1800), poet, lament in Irish
- Nuala Ní Chonchúir (born 1970), novelist, poet
- Eiléan Ní Chuilleanáin (born 1942), poet, non-fiction writer
- Annemarie Ní Churreáin (fl. 2010s), poet
- Nuala Ní Dhomhnaill (born 1952), poet, writing in Irish
- Máire Ní Dhonnchadha Dhuibh (c. 1702–c. 1795), poet
- Éilís Ní Dhuibhne (born 1954), novelist and short story writer in Irish and English
- Ciara Ní É bilingual Irish poet, writer and television presenter
- Ailbhe Ní Ghearbhuigh (born 1984), poet, writing in Irish
- Áine Ní Ghlinn (born 1955), poet, children's writer, writing in Irish
- Máiréad Ní Ghráda (1896–1971), poet, playwright, broadcaster
- Doireann Ní Ghríofa (born 1981), poet writing in Irish and English
- Sorcha Ní Ghuairim (1911–1976), columnist, newspaper editor, teacher
- Máire Bhuí Ní Laoghaire (1774–1849), poet in the oral tradition
- Bríd Ní Mhóráin (born 1951), poet
- Ailís Ní Ríain (fl. 2000s), composer and playwright
- Siobhán Ní Shúilleabháin (1928–2013), dramatist, novelist and children's writer
- Colette Nic Aodha (born 1967), Irish-language poet
- Nuala Níc Con Iomaire (died 2010), playwright
- Sister Nivedita (1867–1911), nun, essayist, non-fiction writer especially on India
- Ellen Kyle Noel (1815–1873), Irish writer who published a number of novels through journals and serialization
- Liz Nugent (born 1967), novelist

== O ==
- Margaret Ó hÓgartaigh (1967–2014), historian
- Kathy O'Beirne (1956–2019), non-fiction writer
- Kathleen O'Brennan (1876–1948), activist, journalist and playwright
- Lily O'Brennan (1878–1948), writer and playwright
- Charlotte Grace O'Brien (1845–1909), novelist, essayist, non-fiction writer and nationalist
- Edna O'Brien (1930–2024), novelist, memoirist, playwright, poet, short story writer
- Eileen O'Brien (1925–1986), journalist
- Frances O'Brien (1840–1883), poet and novelist
- Kate O'Brien (1897–1974), novelist, playwright, travel writer
- Mary O'Brien (writer) (fl. 1785–1790), poet and playwright
- Helen O'Clery (1910–2006), children's writer
- Ellen Bridget O'Connell (1805–1883), poet
- Gemma O'Connor (born 1940), novelist, short story writer
- Niamh O'Connor (active since 2000), journalist, novelist
- Mary Barry O'Delaney (1862–1947), journalist and nationalist
- Mary O'Donnell (born 1954), novelist, poet, short story writer
- Mary O'Donoghue (born 1975), novelist, poet, translator
- Mary Jane O'Donovan Rossa (1845–1916), poet and political activist
- Julia O'Faolain (1932–2020), novelist, short story writer, emigrated to the United States
- Nuala O'Faolain (1940–2008), best-selling novelist, journalist, television producer, critic, memoirist
- Ursula O'Farrell (1934–2022), non-fiction writer on counseling
- Sheila O'Hagan, poet since 1984 (died 2017)
- Adelaide O'Keeffe (1776–1865), poet and novelist
- Doireann O'Mahony, barrister
- Nessa O'Mahony (fl. 1990s), poet
- Mary O'Malley (born 1954), poet
- Kathleen O'Meara (1839–1888), journalist, novelist, biographer
- Louise O'Neill (born 1985), novelist, young adult writer
- Mary Devenport O'Neill (1879–1967), modernist poet, playwright
- Geraldine O'Neill (born c. 1950s), historical novelist
- Moira O'Neill, pen name of Agnes Shakespeare Higginson (1864–1955), popular Irish-Canadian poet
- Caitriona O'Reilly (born 1973), poet, critic
- Emily O'Reilly (fl. 1970s), journalist, non-fiction writer, ombudsman
- Pat O'Shea (1931–2007), children's writer
- Leanne O'Sullivan (fl. 2004), poet
- Maureen Donovan O'Sullivan (1887–1966), educator, journal editor, historian
- Suzanne O'Sullivan (fl. 2010s), non-fiction writer
- Jane Ohlmeyer (fl. 1990s), historian
- Adela Orpen (1855–1927), essay writer and novelist
- Annette Jocelyn Otway-Ruthven (1909–1989), historian and early female academic
- Olivia Owenson, Lady Clarke (1785–1845), poet and dramatist

== P ==
- Siobhán Parkinson (born 1954), children's writer, novelist, non-fiction writer, translator, writes in English and Irish
- Fanny Parnell (1848–1882), poet, known as the Patriot Poet
- Julie Parsons (born 1951), novelist
- Mrs F. C. Patrick, 18th-century Gothic novelist
- Mabel Cosgrove Wodehouse Pearse (1873–?), novelist
- Margaret Pender (1848–1920), Irish writer and poet
- Ethel Penrose (1857–1938), Irish children's writer
- Amelia Perrier (1841–1875), Irish novelist and travel writer
- Alice Perry (1885–1969), poet, feminist and early engineering graduate
- Daphne Pochin Mould, 20th-century historian, pilot, broadcaster and writer
- Madeleine A. Polland (1918–2005), children's author
- Nannie Lambert Power O'Donoghue, (1843–1940), poet, journalist, novelist, social activist
- Mabel Cosgrove Wodehouse Pearse (1873–?), novelist
- Nicola Pierce (born 1969), Irish writer and ghost writer
- Laetitia Pilkington (c. 1709–1750), poet, memoirist
- Louisa Lilias Plunket Greene (1833–1891), children's writer
- Máire Wyse Power (1887–1916), Irish Celtic scholar
- Stefanie Preissner (born 1988), dramatist, screenwriter, actress
- Katherine Arnold Price (1893–1989), poet and writer
- Deirdre Purcell (1945–2023), journalist, novelist, non-fiction writer, actress
- Katherine Purdon (1852–1920), writer

== Q ==
- Marjorie Quarton (born 1930), children's writer, novelist

== R ==
- Sophie Raffalovich (1860–1960), Irish nationalist and writer
- Orlaith Rafter (fl. 1990s), actress and playwright
- Mary Raftery (1957–2012), investigative journalist, filmmaker and writer
- Elizabeth Reapy (fl. 2012), editor, novelist
- Nell Regan (born 1969), poet and non-fiction writer
- Christina Reid (1942–2015), playwright
- Lorna Reynolds (1911–2003), writer, editor and academic
- Grace Rhys (1865–1929), novelist, essayist, poet, children's writer
- Jessie Louisa Rickard (1876–1963), popular novelist
- Charlotte Riddell (1832–1906), influential novelist, short story writer, journal editor
- Lucinda Riley (1965–2021), novelist, actress
- Nesca Robb (1905–1976), poet, non-fiction writer
- Anne Isabella Robertson (c.1830–1910), writer and suffragist
- Regina Maria Roche (1764–1845), popular novelist, author of The Children of the Abbey
- Sally Rooney (born 1991), novelist
- Amanda McKittrick Ros (1860–1939), novelist, poet
- Orna Ross (born 1960), novelist, literary agent
- Rosemarie Rowley (born 1942), poet
- Margot Ruddock (1907–1951), actress, poet
- Meda Ryan (fl. 1980s), historian
- Roma Ryan, since 1982, poet, lyricist
- Elizabeth Ryves (1750–1797), poet, playwright, novelist, journalist, translator

== S ==
- Mary Anne Sadlier (1820–1903), Irish-Canadian novelist, short story writer
- Blanaid Salkeld (1880–1959), poet, playwright, actress, salonist
- Virginia Sandars (1828–1922), author
- Patricia Scanlan (born 1956), novelist
- Eileen Shanahan (1901–1979), poet
- Elizabeth Shane (1877–1951), poet
- Elizabeth Shaw, artist, illustrator and children's writer
- Mabel Sharman Crawford (1820–1912), feminist, travel writer
- Nessa Ní Shéaghda (1916–1993), Irish Celtic Studies scholar
- Eileen Sheehan (born 1963), poet, teacher
- Helena Sheehan (fl. 1980s), philosopher, historian and non-fiction writer
- Betsy Sheridan (1758–1837), diarist
- Frances Sheridan (1724–1766), novelist, playwright
- Dora Sigerson Shorter (1866–1918), poet, sculptor
- Hester Sigerson Piatt (1870–1939), poet and journalist
- Rhoda Cosgrave Sivell (1874–1962), poet
- Niamh Sharkey author and illustrator of children's picturebooks
- Sharon Slater (fl. 2010s), historian
- Doris E. Smith (1919–before 1994), romantic novelist
- Annie M. P. Smithson (1873–1948), novelist and poet
- Cherry Smyth (born 1953), academic, poet, writer and art critic
- Ciara Elizabeth Smyth (fl. 2010s), playwright
- Edith Somerville (1858–1949), novelist in collaboration with her cousin Violet Florence Martin
- Eithne Strong (1925–1999), writer and poet, Irish and English languages
- Deirdre Sullivan, Irish children's writer and poet
- Elinor Sweetman (c. 1861–1922), poet

== T ==
- Seána Talbot (Seána Tinley/Catherine Tinley), novelist
- Jemima von Tautphoeus (1807–1893), novelist, focus on Bavaria
- Alice Taylor (born 1938), novelist, memoirist, poet and children's writer
- Katherine Thurston (1875–1911), novelist, author of The Masquerader
- Mary Tighe (1772–1810), poet
- Melesina Trench (1768–1827), diarist, letter writer, essayist, poet
- Una Troy (1913–1993), novelist, playwright
- Eliza Dorothea Cobbe, Lady Tuite (c. 1764–1850), author and poet
- Lizzie Twigg (1882–1933), poet
- Katharine Tynan (1859–1931), novelist, poet, biographer

== V ==
- Noelle Vial (1959–2003), poet
- Ethel Lilian Voynich (1864–1960), novelist, author of the successful The Gadfly
- Moira Verschoyle (1903–1985)

== W ==
- Helen Waddell (1889–1965), poet, translator, playwright
- Maureen Wall (1918–1972), historian
- Catherine Walsh (born 1964), poet
- Dolores Walshe (born 1949), short story writer, novelist and playwright
- Elizabeth Hely Walshe (1835–1869), writer
- Maria Webb (1804–1873), philanthropist and historian
- Liz Weir (born 1950), storyteller and children's writer
- Biddy White Lennon (1946–2017), actress and food writer
- Sheila Wingfield (1906–1992), poet
- Agnes Romilly White (1872–1945), novelist
- Ida L. White (19th century), poet, feminist
- Isabella Whiteford Rogerson (1835–1905), poet
- Jane Wilde (1821–1896), poet, interested in folk tales
- Catherine Wilmot (1773–1824), travel writer, diarist, letter writer
- Florence Mary Wilson (c. 1870–1946), poet
- Laurie Winkless (fl. 2010s), physicist and science writer
- Denyse Woods (born 1958), novelist
- Evie Woods (born 1976), novelist
- Isabella Letitia Woulfe (1817–1870), novelist
- Maev-Ann Wren (born 1950s), economist, journalist, newspaper editor, non-fiction writer
- Frances Wynne (1863–1893), poet
- Grace Wynne-Jones (fl. 1990s), playwright, journalist, writer

== Y ==
- Ella Young (1867–1956), poet, Celtic mythologist, children's writer, emigrated to California
- Rose Maud Young (1866–1947), diarist, writer

== Z ==
- Jo Zebedee (born 1971), writer

== See also ==
- List of Irish writers
- List of women writers
