= Harriet Martin =

Harriet Martin may refer to:

- Harriet Evans Martin (died 1846), Anglo-Irish novelist
- Harriet Letitia Martin (1801–1891), Irish novelist, daughter of the above
