= Anne Fuller =

Irish novelist

- Died: 1790; County Cork
- Occupation: Writer
- Writing career
- Genre: Gothic novels

Anne Fuller (died 1790) was an Irish novelist in the Gothic genre. She was one of the earliest women writers of Gothic fiction.

== Life and work ==
Anne Fuller was the daughter of William Fuller and Jane Harnett of West Kerries, Tralee, County Kerry. Very little is known about her life except that she never married. She wrote three novels in the gothic style which were reprinted several times. She died of consumption in 1790 near Cork.

Since women readers of novels with supernatural characters and situations were considered "liable to many errors, both in conduct and conversation" and writers were even more confined, writers like Fuller often published anonymously. Fuller reportedly published her work Alan Fitz-Osbourne anonymously.

She was one of the "lost" women writers listed by Dale Spender in Mothers of the Novel: 100 Good Women Writers Before Jane Austen. Her work has since been reviewed as an insight into the early novelists and women writing in the 18th and 19th centuries. She is sometimes considered one of the key Irish authors in the development of gothic fiction along with Regina Maria Roche, Anne Burke, Mrs F. C. Patrick, Anna Millikin, Catharine Selden, Marianne Kenley, and Sydney Owenson (later Lady Morgan). Her writing itself, in contrast, Baker in 1924 described as 'mediocre'.

== Bibliography ==
- The Convent; or, The History of Sophia Nelson, Anne Fuller, London: T. Wilkins, 1786
- Alan Fitz-Osborne, an Historical Tale. 2 vols. Anne Fuller, Dublin: P. Byrne, 1787.
- The Son of Ethelwolf: An Historical Tale. 2 vols. Anne Fuller, London: G. G. J. and J. Robinson, 1789.
