= Gemma O'Connor =

Gemma O'Connor may refer to:

- Gemma O'Connor (writer) (born 1940), Irish mystery writer
- Gemma O'Connor (camogie) (born 1985), Irish camogie player
