= Anne Burke =

Anne Burke may refer to:

- Anne Burke (writer) (fl. 1780–1805), Irish Gothic novelist
- Anne M. Burke (born 1944), Illinois Supreme Court Justice for Cook County, Illinois
