= Mary O'Brien =

Mary O'Brien may refer to:

- Mary Ann O'Brien (born 1960), Irish politician
- Mary Eileen O'Brien, American academic administrator
- Mary F. O'Brien, United States Air Force general
- Mary Grace O'Brien (born 1958), judge of the Virginia Court of Appeals
- Dusty Springfield (Mary Isobel Catherine Bernadette O'Brien, 1939–1999), British pop singer
- Mary Kay O'Brien (born 1965), American politician and judge
- Mary O'Brien, 3rd Countess of Orkney (1721–1791), mute Irish countess
- Mary O'Brien, 4th Countess of Orkney (1755–1831), Scottish peeress
- Mary O'Brien (philosopher) (1926–1998), feminist political philosopher
- Mary O'Brien (writer) (fl. 1785–1790), Irish poet and playwright
- Mary O'Brien Harris (1865–1938), British politician
