= Mrs F. C. Patrick =

Gothic novelist

- Born: Unknown
- Died: Unknown
- Occupation: Writer
- Writing career
- Period: 1797-1799
- Genre: Gothic novels

Mrs F. C. Patrick was an 18th-century writer of Gothic fiction with at least three novels to her name. She was one of the earliest female writers of Gothic fiction.

== Life and work ==
Almost nothing is known about Mrs F. C. Patrick and her name may have been a pen name. She is believed to have been Irish and to have lived in England. She describes herself in one of her books as the wife of an officer.

Each of her novels is different from the others. One is, as is typical of many gothic novels, anti Catholic; one satirizes the novels of Mrs Radcliffe and other gothic writers; and the third refers to the national politics of the day, set in domestic scale plots. She is discussed as one of the Irish Gothic authors by various critics of the genre: "During this period, the key Irish authors of Gothic fiction were mainly women, and include Anne Fuller, Regina Maria Roche, Anne Burke, Mrs F. C. Patrick, Anna Millikin, Catharine Selden, Marianne Kenley, and Sydney Owenson (later Lady Morgan)."

== Criticism ==
From Critical Review /JAS, 1799, ns vol. 27 (1799): 115.

The Jesuit; or, the History of Anthony Babington, Esq. an historical Novel
Here we have a tale of more than common merit. Of those which, since the Ghost Seer, have hinged upon supernatural illusions, this is perhaps the only one that does not disgust by the impossibility of its incidents. Some passages are deeply pathetic. To the death of Sheffield we object, as an act of unnecessary and improbable cruelty, which indeed could not have been perpetrated.

There is a longer discussion in the Monthly Review /JAS, 1799 vol. 30 (1799): 95-7.

== Bibliography ==
- The Irish Heiress: A Novel. London: William Lane, 1797
- More Ghosts!. London: William Lane, 1798
- The Jesuit; or, the History of Anthony Babington, Esq. An Historical Novel. R. Cruttwell, 1799
