= Fanny Forrester =

Fanny Forrester may refer to:

- Emily Chubbuck (1817–1854), American poet who used the pseudonym Fanny Forrester
- Fanny Forrester (English poet) (1852–1889), English poet of Irish heritage
