= Deirdre Brennan =

Irish writer and poet

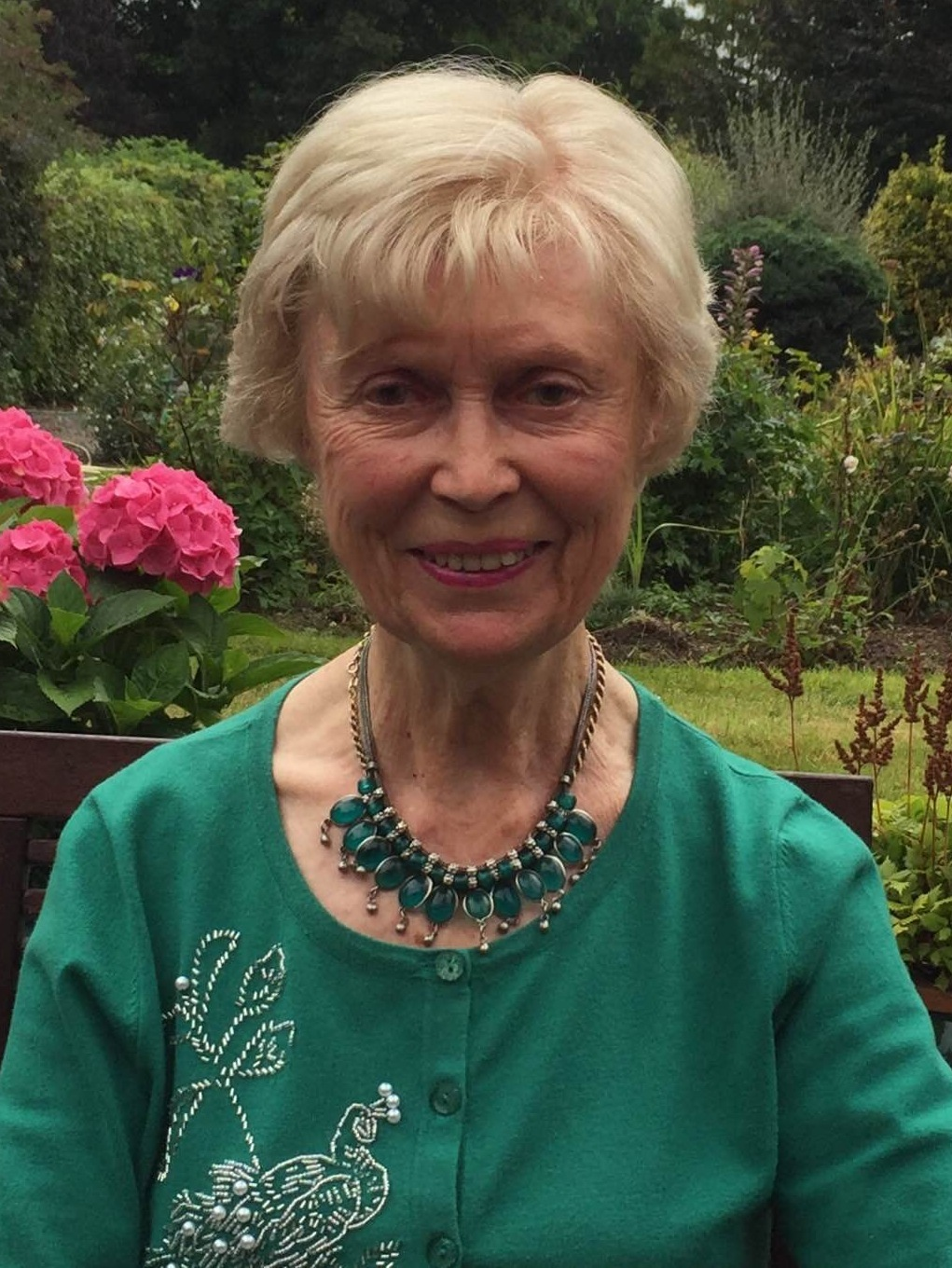
- Brennan in 2020
- Born: 1934 (age 91–92); Dublin
- Education: University College Dublin
- Occupations: Poet, author, playwright, translator

Deirdre Brennan (born 1934) is a bilingual Irish poet, playwright and short story writer who writes both in the Irish language and in English.

== Biography ==
Brennan was born in Dublin and was raised in County Tipperary where she attended schools in Clonmel and Thurles. She studied English and Latin at University College Dublin, then undertaking a Higher Diploma in Education. She moved to Carlow in 1965.

Brennan taught at St Patrick's College, Carlow. She began writing in Irish after co-founding the Éigse Carlow Arts Festival in 1979. She has published sixteen books to date, including twelve collections of poetry. She was awarded an Oireachtas Prize for Ag Mealladh Réalta, and won the Farmgate Café National Poetry Award in 2023 with Medea's Cauldron.

She collaborated with writers Máighréad Medbh and Nuala Ní Chonchúir on Divas! (2003), a volume of poetry, which was launched during Éigse by Olivia O'Leary. Her poem At Home was included in The Works anthology of women's poetry, Women's Work VII. Her poetry is included in The Great Book of Ireland, The Field Day Anthology of Irish Writing, Volume 5, Eating her Wedding Dress (Ragged Sky Press, 2009), Catullus Gaelach, edited by Pádraig Ó Laighin (Coiscéim, 2010), and is widely anthologised. Brennan's work is featured on the Irish post primary curricula and in the courses and textbooks of Royal Irish Academy of Music.

Her two collections of short fiction were published as An Banana Bean Sí agus Scéalta Eile (Coiscéim, 2009) and Staying Thin for Daddy (Arlen House, 2014). Her short stories have appeared in The Irish Times, Passages, Anois, Comhar, Feasta, Lá and Foinse and have featured on Cork Campus Radio, RTÉ Radio 1, as well as a six-part drama series, Go to Blazes. Her work is represented in Nua Scéalta, selected by Séan Ó Mainnín (Cló Iar-Chonnacht, 2005), Twisted Truths, selected by Brian Ó Conchubhair (Cló Iar-Chonnacht, 2011), Thar Toinn, selected by Micheál Ó hAodha (Coiscéim, 2015).

Brennan served as chair and secretary of the Éigse festival during its early years. She was also a founder member of Comhaltas Ceoltóirí Éireann in Carlow, serving as chair and secretary.

== Published works ==
=== Poetry collections ===
- I Reilig na mBan Rialta, Coiscéim, 1984
- Scothanna Geala, Coiscéim, 1989
- Thar Cholbha na Mara, Coiscéim, 1993
- Ag Mealladh Réalta, Coiscéim, 2000
- The Hen Party, Lapwing Publications, 2001, 9781898472551
- Beneath Castles of White Sail, in Divas, Arlen House, 2003, 1903631408, 9781903631409
- Swimming with Pelicans: Ag Eitilt fara Condair, Arlen House, 2007, 9781903631645
- Hidden Places: Scáthan Eile, Arlen House, 2011, 9781851320318; 9781851320318
- As Trunc Fernando Pessoa, Coiscéim, 2015
- Cuislí Allta, Rogha Dánta: Wild Pulses, Selected Poems, Arlen House, 2017, 9781851321574
- An Oiche ar Bheophianadh, Coiscéim, 2019
- Medea's Cauldron, Arlen House, 2022, 9781851322916

=== Prose collections ===
- An Banana Bean Sí agus Scéalta Eile, Coiscéim, 2009
- Staying Thin for Daddy, Arlen House, 2016. 9781851321087; 9781851321087

=== Plays ===
- Smideadh: Makeup, Arlen House, 2020, 9781851322619
- Cuma agus Claochmú: Mutagenesis: a bilingual play, Arlen House, 2022, 9781851322398

== Awards and distinctions ==
- Poetry Ireland ‘Choice of the Year’, 1989 for Scothanna Geala (Coiscéim, 1989).
- Oireachtas Literary Award, 2000 for Ag Mealladh Réalta (Coiscéim, 2000).
- Winner of The SHOp Translation Award, 2002 The SHOp: a magazine of poetry, vol.10, Autumn/Winter, 2002 for Stillbirth : Marbhghin.
- Winner of the Farmgate Café National Poetry Award, 2023 with Medea's Cauldron.

== See also ==
- Irish poetry
- List of Irish women writers
