= Frank Carney (playwright) =

Irish playwright (1902–1978)

Frank Carney (1902–1978) was an Irish playwright.

Born in Westport, County Mayo, he was educated at schools in Tuam and later at Galway University. He was a civil servant for a number of years in the Old Age Pensions Department, which gave him an opportunity of observing Irish rural life at close quarters. He had a career with the Abbey Theatre, Dublin from 1936 to 1938. A number of his plays were staged at the Abbey Theatre, including They Went By Bus (1939), Peeping Tom (1940) and The Righteous are Bold (1946). He was also cast in many productions at the Abbey Theatre and for a time in 1936 he was stage manager with the Peacock Theatre. One of his performances was in a play by Irish playwright Teresa Deevy called The Wild Goose where he played the part of Father Ryan. There were six performances in this production.

== Plays ==
- Bolt from the Blue, a comedy in three acts; adapted from the novel Friday's Well.
- They went by the Bus, 1939.
- Peeping Tom, 1940.
- The House of Cards, 1942.
- The Doctor's Boy, 1942.
- The Righteous are Bold, 1946.
- Siul Barr Cnoic, 1959.
