= Mary Isabel Leslie =

Irish nationalist and writer

- Born: 1899; Dublin, Ireland
- Died: 1978 (aged 78–79)
- Occupation: Writer
- Writing career
- Genre: Romance

Mary Isabel Leslie (1899–1978) was an Irish nationalist and the writer of over 30 novels. She also used the pseudonym Temple Lane.

== Life and work ==
Leslie was born in Portabello House, Dublin in April 1899, to Reverend John Leslie and Mary Richardson Smith. She had one sister, Jean Annette. Her father was later Dean of Lismore, although Leslie was raised in County Tipperary. She received her secondary education at Sherborne School for Girls in Dorset, and then attended Trinity College Dublin. Leslie remained at the university, where she was academically successful, winning a gold medal in 1922 and gaining her D.Litt. in 1943 for work on Felicia Hemans.

Leslie wrote poetry and novels under two pen names, those of Jean Herbert and Temple Lane. Her novel Friday's Well was adapted for the stage by Frank Carney in 1950. She was a member of Dublin's Women Writers' Club, which had been founded by Blanaid Salkeld along with Dorothy Macardle, Elizabeth Bowen, Helen Waddell, Maura Laverty, Winifred Letts, Sybil le Brocquy, Patricia Lynch, Rosamond Jacob, Hanna Sheehy Skeffington, Nora Connolly O'Brien, Christine Longford, Ethel Davidson (President of the Club in 1937) and Teresa Deevy. As Davidson put it, their aim was sharpening "the wits, and improving the standard of criticism, as well as encouraging the writers".

Leslie's novels were popular with readers, but not highly appreciated by the writing profession. Mary Rose Callaghan termed her work "female fiction before the Liberation". She added, "There is little individuality in her novels and much simplicity and humorless earnestness."

== Bibliography ==
- Burnt Bridges (London: John Long, 1925; popular edition 1926)
- No Just Cause (London: John Long, 1925; popular edition 1926)
- Defiance (London: John Long, 1926)
- Second Sight (London: John Long, 1926)
- Watch the Wall (London: John Long, 1927)
- The Band of Orion (London: Jarrolds, 1928)
- The Little Wood (London: Jarrolds, 1930)
- Blind Wedding (London: Jarrolds, 1931)
- Sinner Anthony (London: Jarrolds, 1933)
- The Trains Go South (London: Jarrolds, 1938; foreword by Lynn Doyle)
- Battle of the Warrior (London: Jarrolds, 1940)
- House of My Pilgrimage (Dublin: Talbot Press; London: Frederick Muller, 1941)
- Friday's Well (Dublin: Talbot Press, 1943)
- Come Back! (Dublin: Talbot Press, 1945)
- My Bonny's Away (Dublin: Talbot Press, 1947)
- Fisherman's Wake (Dublin and Cork: Talbot Press, n.d.; London: Longmans, 1940; Dublin: Curlews, 1945)
