= The Lost Bookshop =

2023 novel by Evie Woods

- Front cover of the book
- Author: Evie Woods
- Language: English
- Genre: Magic realism
- Publisher: One More Chapter (HarperCollins)
- Publication date: 22 June 2023
- Media type: Print
- Pages: 442 pp.
- ISBN: 9780008609214 (paperback)
- OCLC: 1376269772
- Followed by: The Story Collector
- Website: www.harpercollins.com/blogs/authors/evie-woods

The Lost Bookshop is a novel with elements of bibliophilia, magical realism, fantasy, historical fiction, and romance by the Irish author Evie Woods. The book also tackles serious real-world issues such as alcoholism, domestic violence and societal misogyny.

The book was published in 2023 by One More Chapter, an imprint of HarperCollins. Woods's writing had previously been self-published under her real name, Evie Gaughan.

The novel was shortlisted for page-turner of the year in the 2024 British Book Awards. It made first place in The Wall Street Journal's weekly book list; made the Sunday Times top 10, and became a bestseller at Amazon UK and US. On 23 May 2024, the publisher One More Chapter reported that the book had sold over one million copies.

== Summary ==
The Lost Bookshop, which uses first-person narratives, alternates between the characters in two main threads set in Dublin, London and Paris: one that begins in the 1920s, the other in contemporary times (circa 2020 but making no mention of COVID-19), and which gradually converge in the reader's mind to an eventual dénouement.

In 1921, Opaline Carlisle is in London and is being pushed into an arranged marriage by her domineering mother and brother, Lyndon, a veteran officer wounded in the First World War. An independently minded young woman who cherishes freedom and adventure, she flees to France, rather than agree to marry, and finds work at a bookshop, Shakespeare and Company, where she learns about the art of dealing in rare books and meets famous literary characters, including the novelists James Joyce and Ernest Hemingway.

Meanwhile, in contemporary Ireland, Martha flees to Dublin to escape her abusive past, and finds work as a live-in housekeeper with an elderly lady, Madame Bowden.

Henry, an English scholar, desperately in search of a possible unpublished second novel by Emily Brontë and for a lost bookshop, which play key roles in an academic study for which he's received funding, also arrives in Dublin around this time. Next door to the site where he believes the lost bookshop should be (but mysteriously is not), by accidental fate or destiny he meets Martha.

After being found by her brother and escaping once to Dublin where she opens a small bookstore, Opaline is found again and committed to Connacht District Lunatic Asylum at her brother's behest. She finally escapes and flees yet again to Dublin and goes back to her bookshop there, still hiding from her brother under the assumed name, Miss Gray. Having apparently disappeared from historical records, this makes it difficult for Henry and Martha to track her down as they try to piece together her story.

The separate narrative threads gradually converge through the influence of Opaline and the bookshop, which is depicted as having its own agency and magical properties. Ultimately, the connections between the characters are revealed and the mystery of the bookshop's disappearance is resolved.

== Reception ==
The novel was shortlisted for page-turner of the year in the 2024 British Book Awards. It made first place in the Wall Street Journal weekly book list; made the Sunday Times top 10 on 31 December 2023, and became a bestseller at Amazon UK and US. Between June 2023 and January 2024, the book had sold over 500,000 copies. On 23 May 2024, the publisher One More Chapter reported in a post on Twitter that the book had sold over one million copies. The book was first released in digital format as an eBook and an audiobook and became a hit even before a paperback edition came out. It has been translated into twenty languages.

Corriere della TV notes (in Italian) that The Lost Bookshop contains many literary references that will appeal to literary investigators, book collectors, and bibliophiles. The reviewer finds the historical thread "distressing", writing that "the early 1920s were a time when women were mere chattels of the male members of their family. Their gender ensured that they had no social standing or power."

Reviewing The Lost Bookshop, Mairéad Hearne says that the work has been described as "The Keeper of Stories meets The Lost Apothecary" and that the work is an "evocative and charming novel full of mystery and secrets." Having read other works by Evie Gaughan, Hearne is "totally captivated by the magic and warmth that emanates from her stories."

In conclusion, Hearne writes: "The Lost Bookshop is a joy to read, a seductive tale that sparks the imagination, a truly immersive and charismatic read of self-discovery and strength imbued with a sense of hope and passion."

Kate Storey writes in Culturefly that "[b]ecoming the person you were always meant to be is one of the most uplifting elements of The Lost Bookshop". A "magical story", in her opinion, it is "a wonderful example of how a book about books can lift our spirits and make us feel like anything is possible."

Kiefer Jones, reviewing the work for Books & Review writes that The Lost Bookshop is a "captivating tale"; "an evocative and charming novel with mystery and secrets."

== See also ==
- Lost Generation
- Women's rights
- Women's suffrage
