= Oliver Stonor =

English writer

Oliver Stonor (born Frederick Field Stoner, and also using the pseudonym (E.) Morchard Bishop, FRSL) (3 July 1903 – 12 April 1987) was an English novelist, reviewer, translator, and man of letters. He was briefly the husband of the Irish writer Norah Hoult.

He was born at Teddington, the son of Alfred Hills Stoner and Sarah Louise Stoner, and educated at Kingston Grammar School. His father and grandfather were quantity surveyors, and he was trained in this profession at the offices of the family firm in Broad Street, City of London. As soon as he was 21, he took up writing as a career in the Literary London of the 1920s, though he later put his surveying to good use in wartime.

He used the pen name Oliver Stonor because he felt it looked and sounded better than his own name; the "er" at the end of "Oliver", clashing with "Stoner", prompted the change to "Stonor". He was not related to the Stonor family of Stonor Park; the Stoners came originally from Cowfold in Sussex; his grandfather had bought Harcourt, near Pembury, in Kent. The name Morchard Bishop is actually that of a town in Devon.

In 1926, he visited the home of the writer Arthur Machen, who was living at Melina Place. He joined the wide and varied circle of those who sought out and admired Machen for his conversation, as well as for his writing; and when Machen and his wife Purefoy moved to Amersham, they stayed in touch.

Stonor also corresponded with John Betjeman.

His last will and testament can be traced through the UK Indexes of Wills and Probate, and appears in the following form: "STONER, Frederick Field, otherwise Oliver or BISHOP, Morchard of Velthams Morebath Tiverton Devon died 12 April 1987 Probate London 28 August 1987 £399411".

== Selected works ==
- The Way to Succeed (translation of Le moyen de parvenir by François Béroalde de Verville, 1930)
- End of Mr Davidson (1932)
- Two for Joy (1938)
- Aunt Betty (1939)
- The Green Tree and the Dry (1939)
- The Star Called Wormwood (1941)
- The Song and the Silence (1947)
- Valerie, a Study of a Temperament (1948)
- Blake's Hayley (1951)
- A First Book of Synonyms (1963)
