= Norah Hoult =

Irish writer (1898–1984)

- Born: 20 September 1898; Dollymount, Dublin
- Died: 6 April 1984 (aged 85); Greystones, County Wicklow

Eleanor Lucy Hoult, known by her pen name Norah Hoult, (20 September 1898 – 6 April 1984) was an Irish writer of novels and short stories. Hoult wrote twenty-three novels and four short story collections. Her work deals primarily with themes of alcohol abuse, prostitution, class dynamics and ill-fated marriages. Between the 1940s and 50s, Hoult's work was frequently banned by the Irish Censorship Board.

== Early life and education ==
Hoult was born at 1 Ardilaun Villas, Dollymount, Dublin on 20 September 1898. Her mother, Margaret O'Shaughnessy, was a Catholic who eloped at the age of 21 with a protestant English architect named Powis Hoult. Hoult's mother died when she was nine years old and her father died months later. After her parents' deaths, Hoult and her brother were sent to live with their father's relations in England and were educated in various boarding schools in the north of England.

== Career ==
Hoult began her career in journalism, working for British newspapers. She worked first for the Sheffield Daily Telegraph, followed by the Telegraph and Pearson's Magazine. Her first book, Poor Women!, appeared in 1928. This collection of five short stories received critical praise, and has been reprinted several times, both individually and in selected editions. It was followed by a novel, Time Gentlemen! Time! (1930), which deals with a woman's unhappy marriage to an alcoholic. This novel exemplifies Hoult's interest in depicting the strain of social constrains and maintaining respectability in Ireland during the 1930s and 1950s.

Hoult married the writer Oliver Stonor, and lived with him at The Cottage in Windsor Great Park for a year; the marriage was dissolved in 1934. She returned to Ireland to collect material for her writing in 1931, and remained there until 1937, when she moved to New York for two years. Her next two books, Holy Ireland (1935) and its sequel Coming from the Fair (1937), show Irish family life before World War I.

Fellow Irish writer, Seán Ó Faoláin, wrote to Hoult in 1936 to congratulate her on Holy Ireland. O'Faolain wrote that he 'admire[d] the strength of it [...] and the sympathy of it'. Contemporary critics are similarly complimentary about her work, comparing her not only to short story writers such as O'Faolain and Frank O'Connor but also to novelists including Kate O'Brien and Edna O'Brien for the way in which her work examines the influence of the Catholic Church on the quotidian lives of Irish women.

In 1939 she settled in Bayswater, London, not far from Violet Hunt upon whom Claire Temple the protagonist in There Were No Windows (1944) is modelled. The novel There Were No Windows is set in London during the Second World War in which the trauma of the Blitz impacts upon Claire Temple, a novelist suffering with dementia. In 1957, Hoult, returned to live in Ireland. In 1977 she published her last book.

Hoult died at Jonquil Cottage, Greystones, County Wicklow, on April 6, 1984. She destroyed all of her papers, but Oliver Stoner kept two of her manuscripts which are now held by the Library of Trinity College Dublin. Hoult was a friend of many notable Irish figures including James Stephens and poet and physician Oliver St. John Gogarty. Hoult was also friends with the Scottish writer Fred Urquhart and some of their correspondence is preserved in his archive.

== Legacy ==
Despite a 44 year publishing career, critics have described Hoult's work as "overlooked" and "neglected". Nicola Beauman is quoted as saying Hoult "is a very good example of a woman writer who falls completely out of fashion and is forgotten. She was an absolutely brilliant writer and well-known at the time in a way she isn't now". Beauman, editor at London's Persephone Books, has revisited Hoult's work since her death. In 2005 Persephone Books republished her novel There Were No Windows.

A plaque was unveiled to Hoult at her home, 25 Ashfield Park, Terenure, in September 2025.

== Works ==
- Poor Women! (short stories, 1928)
- Time Gentlemen! Time! (1930) [published in the U.S. as Closing Time]
- Violet Ryder (from Poor Women!, 1930)
- Apartments to Let (1931)
- Youth Can't Be Served (1933)
- Holy Ireland (1935)
- Coming from the Fair (1937)
- Nine Years is a Long Time (short stories, 1938)
- Four Women Grow Up (1940)
- Smilin' on the Vine (1941)
- Augusta Steps Out (1942)
- Scene for Death (1943)
- There Were No Windows (1944) (Republished in 2005 by Persephone Books)
- House Under Mars (1946)
- Farewell Happy Fields (1948) (republished 2019 by New Island Books)
- Cocktail Bar (short stories, 1950) (republished 2018 by New Island Books)
- Frozen Ground (autobiography, 1952)
- Sister Mavis (1953)
- A Death Occurred (1954)
- Journey Into Print (1954)
- Father Hone and the Television Set (1956)
- Father and Daughter (1957)
- Husband and Wife (1959)
- The Last Days of Miss Jenkinson (1962)
- A Poet's Pilgrimage (1966)
- Only Fools and Horses Work (1969)
- Not For Our Sins Alone (1972)
- Two Girls in the Big Smoke (1977)
