= Alice Next Door =

2005 novel by Judi Curtin

- Author: Judi Curtin
- Publisher: The O'Brien Press
- Publication date: September 10, 2005
- ISBN: 9780862788988
- Followed by: Alice Again

Alice Next Door is an Irish children's novel written by Judi Curtin and illustrated by Woody Fox. It was first published in 2005 by O'Brien Press. It is the first of the Alice and Megan series.

== Plot summary ==
The story revolves around an Irish twelve-year-old girl called Megan Sheehan, whose best friend, Alice O'Rourke, has just moved away from Limerick to Dublin with her younger brother Jamie and her domineering mother. Megan enters sixth class on her own and finds it hard to cope with no friends.

Although Megan can e-mail Alice and call her every Saturday, she has difficulties dealing with her exasperating mother and arch-enemy Melissa on her own. Megan is humiliated when her stingy, non-consumerist mother Sheila Sheehan orders her to petition for a park to be kept. To make up for this, Sheila takes Megan to Dublin for five and a half hours, where she can spend the day with Alice.

At the end of this day, Alice tells Megan she has a plan to move herself back to Limerick, and promises to tell Megan the next time she sees her.

Once the Hallowe'en holidays come around, Alice travels down to Limerick for three days to stay with her father, Megan's next-door neighbour. Here Alice reveals her plan. She will stay in Megan's house for the whole week without any parents knowing - Alice's father thinking she is in Dublin, Alice's mother thinking she is with Mr O'Rourke.

Alice stays in Megan's bedroom the whole week, telling her mother that she is too sick to come home on the train. Megan manages to stash food away for her, like Pot Noodles, but over the week Alice gets more and more irritated and Megan realises how hard it is for her to have divorced parents.

Alice's mother comes down to Limerick when she discovers her daughter is not at Mr O'Rourke's house. She enters the Sheehan home with her ex-husband, find Alice and takes her back to Dublin. Megan is extremely upset.

However, in the end they ultimately make it work. Alice comes down for the holidays and they still stay best friends forever.

== Characters ==
- Megan Sheehan: The protagonist of the Alice and Megan series. Megan is shy and sometimes lets Alice take charge over her.
- Alice O'Rourke: Megan's best friend
- Sheila Sheehan : Megan's environmental crazy mother
- Miss O'Herily: Megan's teacher

== Books in the series ==
1. Alice Next Door (2005)
2. Alice Again (2006)
3. Don't Ask Alice (2007)
4. Alice in the Middle (2007)
5. Bonjour Alice (2008)
6. Alice and Megan Forever (2008)
7. Alice to the Rescue (2009)
1. The Alice and Megan Cookbook (2010)
