= Letitia McClintock =

Writer, folklorist

Letitia McClintock (12 February 1835 – 1917) was an Irish writer and folklorist. Born in County Donegal, she collected folk stories from the area in which she lived. Her work was included in a number of collections, including Fairy and Folk Tales of the Irish Peasantry by W. B. Yeats.

== Life ==
McClintock was born to Robert McClintock and Margaret Macan in County Donegal on 12 February 1835. She lived with her family for her whole life. She worked as a writer and was a collector of folk stories from the areas around Dunmore and Kilrea where she grew up. She contributed to the Dublin University Magazine in 1878. She also wrote novels which tended to have an anti-Land League tone. W. B. Yeats had great appreciation for the work she had done on folk stories and included several in his book Fairy and Folk Tales of the Irish Peasantry published in 1888. She was staying with her sister Alice Smyth in Ardmore, Derry in 1901 and with her sister Isabel Barton in Croaghross, Clondavaddog in 1911. McClintock died in 1917.

== Bibliography ==
- Seven Irish Tales (1857)
- A Boycotted Household (1881).
- Alice's Pupil (1883)
- Sir Spangle and The Dingy Hen
- The Cottagers Of Glencarran (1869)
- The March of Loyalty (1884)
