= Roisin Meaney =

Irish novelist (born 1959)

- Born: September 1959 (age 66); Listowel, County Kerry

Roisin Meaney (born September 1959), is an Irish novelist based in West Clare.

== Biography ==
Roisin Meaney was born in Listowel, County Kerry, though her family moved to Tipperary town before she was one year old. After that Meaney moved to Limerick and lived there until 2023, with periods in the US, London and Africa, until she relocated to West Clare. Meaney qualified as a primary school teacher and taught in Dublin before spending two years in Zimbabwe. In London, she worked as a copywriter for three years. Back in Ireland, she resumed her teaching but also began writing, and in 2001 her first novel, The Daisy Picker, won a Write a Bestseller competition and was published in 2004. Meaney switched to job-sharing to allow more time for writing until, four years later—with three published novels and another on the way—she took early retirement from the classroom and became a full-time writer. Her twenty-second novel, Moving On, was published in February 2025 and she's currently working on the next, due out in spring 2026.

== Bibliography ==
- The Daisy Picker, (2004)
- Putting Out the Stars, (2005)
- Don't Even Think About It, (2006)
- The Last Week of May, (2007)
- See If I Care, (2007) with Judi Curtin
- The People Next Door, (2008)
- Half Seven on a Thursday, (2009)
- Love in the Making, (2010)
- The Things We Do for Love, (2011)
- One Summer, (2012)
- Something in Common, (2013)
- After the Wedding, (2014)
- Two Fridays in April, (2015)
- I'll be Home for Christmas, (2015)
- The Reunion, (2016)
- The Street Where You Live, (2017)
- The Anniversary, (2018)
- The Birthday Party, (2019)
- The Restaurant, (2020)
- It's That Time of Year, (2020)
- The Book Club, (2021)
- Life Before Us (2022)
- A Winter to Remember (2023)
- Moving On (2025)
