= Mary McDermott =

Former Irish poet

Mary McDermott (fl. 1832) was an Irish poet.

McDermott was living in Killyleagh, County Down, upon publication of her first volume in 1832. She also composed occasional music to accompany her verses. My Early Dreams was dedicated to Elizabeth Albana, wife of Frederick Hervey, 1st Marquess of Bristol.

== Bibliography ==
- My Early Dreams, Belfast, 1832.
- Lays of Love, Dublin, 1859.
