= Evie Woods =

Irish author

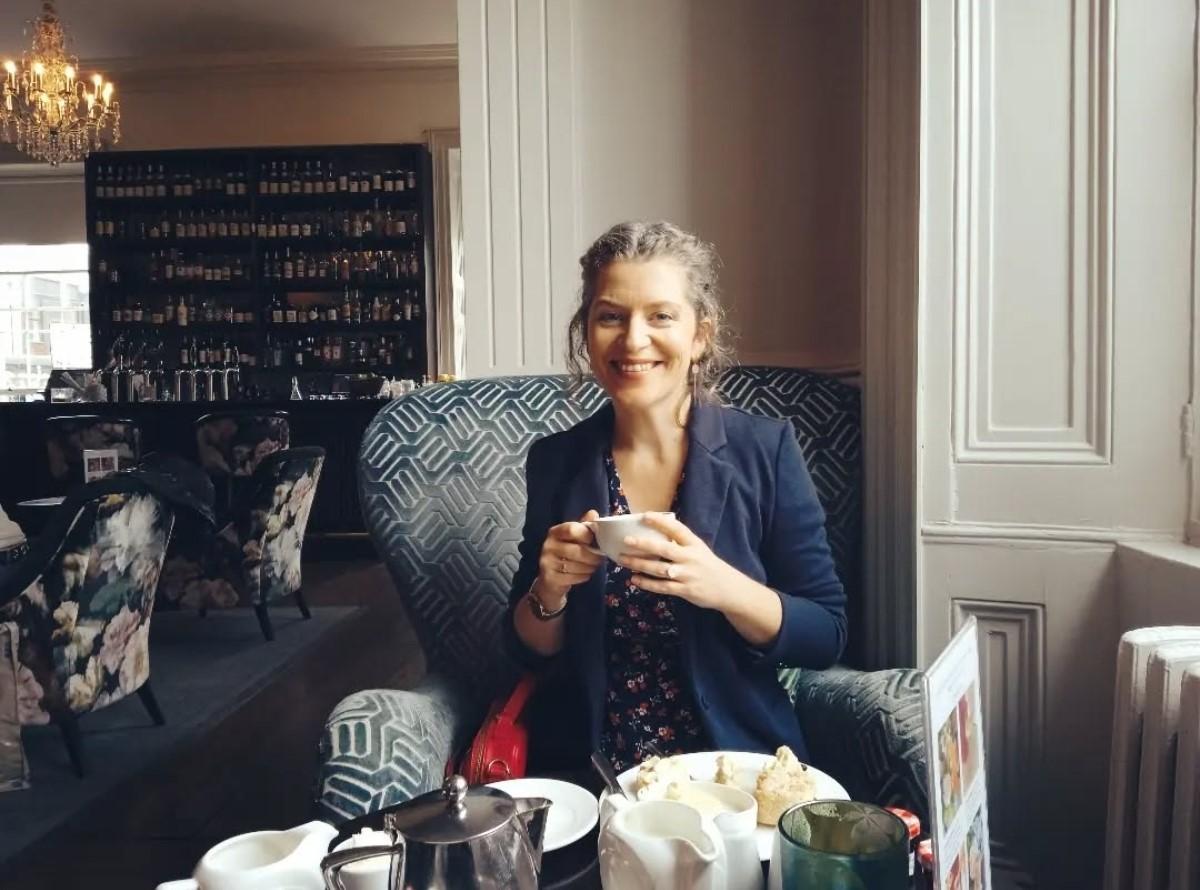
- Evie Woods in 2023
- Born: Evie Gaughan; 1976 (age 49–50); Galway, Ireland
- Occupation: Author
- Writing career
- Pen name: Evie Woods
- Years active: 2013–present
- Genres: Bibliophilia, magical realism, fantasy, historical fiction, and romance
- Notable work: The Lost Bookshop
- Website: eviewoods.com

Evie Gaughan (born 1976), who now writes under the pen-name Evie Woods, is an Irish novelist best known for The Lost Bookshop.

== Early life ==
Gaughan was born in 1976 and was raised in Galway. She attended Dominican College, Taylor's Hill in Galway. Later she studied business at what is now the Atlantic Technological University, and went on to achieve a diploma in marketing in 1996, after a final year at Paul Sabatier University in Toulouse, France, as part of the Erasmus Programme.

During her twenties, Gaughan lived and worked in Canada. She suffered from panic attacks and developed social anxiety. As a result, she quit her job, returned to Galway, and took up writing.

== Career ==
Before The Lost Bookshop was picked up by One More Chapter, Gaughan's novels were self-published. She signed a four-book agreement with One More Chapter for the three books that were originally self-published as well as one new book. Her next book, The Story Collector was released in Ireland and the UK in July 2024 and was released in the US in August 2024. The Mysterious Bakery on Rue de Paris was released in March 2025. The Violin Maker's Secret was released in February 2026.

Bibliotherapy is one of the main themes of and motivations behind writing The Lost Bookshop. Gaughan has named Claire Fuller, Carlos Ruiz Zafón, Daphne du Maurier, Gail Honeyman, Elizabeth McKenzie, and Sally Rooney as her favourite authors.

== Bibliography ==
- The Heirloom (2013)
- The Mysterious Bakery on Rue de Paris (2014, 2025)
- The Story Collector (2018, 2024)
- The Lost Bookshop (2023)
- The Violin Maker's Secret (2026)
