= Frances O'Brien =

Irish poet and novelist

- Born: Frances Marcella O'Brien; 24 June 1840 near Ennis, County Clare
- Died: 5 April 1883 (aged 42); Dublin
- Resting place: Kildysart, County Clare

Frances "Attie" O'Brien (24 June 1840 – 5 April 1883) was an Irish poet and novelist.

== Life ==
Frances Marcella O'Brien was born at Peafield near Ennis, County Clare, on 24 June 1840. Her parents were William O'Brien, a farmer, and his wife Marcella (née Burke-Browne) of Newgrove, County Clare. She was the second youngest child of three sons and two daughters. Marcella O'Brien died at age 30, when her children were still young, and William married again to a Miss Taylor of Mulpit, County Galway. Due to financial hardship, the O'Brien family emigrated to New York City in 1849. Due to O'Brien's asthma she was unable to join them, and remained in Ireland with her mother's family at Newgrove. As she was in poor health, she didn't receive a formal education. She was widely read and got direction from her aunt and the parish priest. She became friends with Timothy Daniel Sullivan and the editor of the Irish Monthly, Fr Matthew Russell. It was in the Irish Monthly that O'Brien published poetry and fiction, firstly under "A. O'B." and then under her nickname "Attie O'Brien". One of the first poems of note by O'Brien was published in 1877, Probatica. In 1878 she published 6 more poems.

O'Brien's journals reveal she was self-deprecating about her writing, and that she mainly wrote to stave off boredom and to earn money. She had four novels serialised in the Irish Monthly and the Weekly Freeman, which went on to be published as books, three of them after her death. Two are romantic comedies drawing on Catholic Victorian society in Ireland: The monk's prophecy (1882) and The Carradassan family (1897). The second two are about her growing nationalist sympathies and her anger at British colonial cultural and political oppression through themes of agrarian violence: Won by worth (1891) and Through the dark night (1897). O'Brien was also published in Tinsleys' Magazine, The Nation, and Young Ireland. She herself thought her lack of success in the British market was due to a reluctance of editors to publish content for a Catholic audience, and that Irish publishers did not like her addressing of contemporary issues that were relevant to younger readers.

Owing to her poor health, O'Brien was discouraged from marrying, although she was engaged at one point. She was a devoted Catholic, and spent a lot of her time engaged in charitable works particularly with those housed in the local workhouse. During a month-long visit to Dublin she suffered a severe bout of asthma, dying there on 5 April 1883. She was buried at the Old church in Kildysart, County Clare, a village she had lived most of her adult life. Her grave is marked by a celtic cross in white marble. Mrs M. J. O'Connell wrote a sentimental and selective account of her life: Glimpses of a hidden life: memories of Attie O'Brien (1887). She was a distant relatives of another writer Charlotte Grace O'Brien.
