= Lathóg of Tír Chonaill =

Irish poet

Lathóg of Tír Chonaill (fl. 9th century) was an Irish poet.

== Overview ==
According to a tract seemingly composed well after the 9th century, Lathóg of Tír Chonaill was the mother of the poet Flann mac Lonáin. Lathóg once advised Flann to be liberal and open-handed because the ollamh is bound to give the same hospitality he receives (MacCana, 1974).

== A verse ==
- My blessing and my counsel take my son and Aidhne's glory, Flan. Be generous for our honour's sake, since men give all that you demand. Believe your mother's word that still the niggard poet is in the wrong; Give of your riches with good will, you ask rewards from all for song. (Flower, 1947)
