= Judi Curtin =

Irish novelist and children's writer

- Born: circa 1960s Kenton, London
- Education: University College Cork; St Patrick's College, Dublin
- Website: http://www.judicurtin.com/

Judi Curtin (born c 1960s) is an Irish children's writer and novelist based in Limerick.

== Biography ==
Judi Curtin was born in Kenton, London to Irish parents who were originally from County Kerry. When she was eight her family moved to Douglas, County Cork. She graduated with a degree in English and German from University College Cork. After completing her degree, Curtin trained as a primary school teacher in St Patrick's College, Drumcondra. She worked as a teacher for fifteen years. Curtin has lived in Cork, Dublin, Portlaoise and London but she is currently living in Limerick with her husband, cat and three children. Curtin moved to Limerick in 1987. She began writing novels in 1999, and her first novel was published in 2003. She has since written for children beginning 2005. In 2017 Curtin won the Irish Book Award for Stand By Me.

== Bibliography ==
- See If I Care with Roisin Meaney

=== Alice & Megan ===
- Alice & Megan's Cookbook
- Alice Next Door
- Alice Again
- Don't Ask Alice!
- Alice in the Middle
- Bonjour Alice
- Alice & Megan Forever
- Alice to the Rescue

=== Eva ===
- Eva's Journey
- Eva's Holiday
- Leave it to Eva
- Eva and the Hidden Diary

=== Friends Forever ===
- The Time Spell
- Double Trouble
- The Mystery Tour

=== Time After Time ===
- Time after Time
- Stand by Me
- You've Got a Friend
- Fast Forward

=== Lissadell ===
- Lily at Lissadell
- Lily Steps Up
- Lily and the Lissadell Ghost
