= N. P. Figgis =

Irish archaeologist and author

- Born: Pamela Figgis; 1939
- Died: 2014 (aged 74–75)
- Occupations: archaeologist author
- Writing career
- Pen name: Helen Wykham; Paddy Figgis; Pamela Evans

N. P. Figgis (1939–2014) was an Irish archaeologist and author who lived in Wales most of her adult life. Her non fiction writing covered Neolithic and Bronze Age monuments in Wales.

== Career ==
Figgis grew up in Lusk near Skerries but was sent to school in England. She then went to Vienna to the Spanish Riding School, the Opera and Art school. After that she attended Cambridge where she read English and Archaeology. She got her first job as a teacher in the Cotswolds. After a few years however Figgis decided she wanted to complete her studies and returned to the Institute of Archaeology in London. It was there she met her husband who was the first to encourage her to submit her novel for publication. Figgis fiction work was first published in 1974 under Helen Wykham. Her professional work was published under her own name.

== Personal life ==
Figgis married Dr John Evans and had three children. They moved to Wales and though they later divorced Figgis lived in Wales from 1967. Figgis claimed to have learned to speak enough Welsh to be able to argue.

== Bibliography ==
- Ribstone Pippins (1974)
- Cavan (1977)
- Ottoline Atlantica (1980)
- The Fourth Mode (1989)
- Dead Men's Boats: The Early Medieval Canoe from Llan-gors and the Sunken Dugouts of Wales and the Marches (1995)
- The Romans in Breconshire and Radnorshire - A Field Guide (1995)
- On the Bright Road (1999)
- Welsh Prehistory: Catalogue of Accessions in the County and Local Museums of Wales, and Other Collections (1999)
- Prehistoric Preseli (2001)
- Thank You for the Music (2014)
