= Colette Nic Aodha =

Irish poet and writer

- Born: 1967 (age 58–59); Shrule, County Mayo, Ireland
- Education: B.A., M.A.
- Known for: Poetry
- Children: 3

Colette Nic Aodha (born 1967) is an Irish poet and writer.

== Biography ==
Colette Nic Aodha was born in Shrule, County Mayo. She attended University College Galway where she completed a BA in Irish and History in 1988. She later went on to get an MA in Irish and is completing a PhD. She also gained a teaching qualification and spent several years as a secondary school teacher in Dublin and Carlow as well as in her own school in Galway. Nic Aodha has also taught in the Department of Irish Studies in Galway where she now lives and writes in both English and Irish. Most of her work is Irish language poetry although she has at least one collection of poetry in English and several in both. She has also completed an academic review of the blind poet Antoine Ó Raifteirí. Her work is used on the syllabus for primary, secondary and third-level students.

Nic Aodha is on the board of directors for Poetry Ireland and works on IMRAM, the Irish Language Festival. Her work has been in multiple anthologies.

== Bibliography ==
- Baill seirce, 1998
- Faoi chrann cnó capaill, 2000
- Gallúnach-ar-rópa, 2003
- Ádh mór, 2004
- Sundial, 2005
- Between curses = Bainne géar, 2007
- Ainteafan, Coiscéim, 2008
- Scéal ón oirthear, 2009
- Raiftearaí i gceartlár a dhaoine san aonú haois is fiche, 2009
- Áilíos, 2010
- In castlewood : an ghaoth aduaidh, 2012
- Oíche Nollag na mBan sa bhFásach, 2014
- Bainne Gear : Sour Milk, 2016
- Réabhlóideach, 2020, Coiscéim
