= Mary O'Donoghue =

Irish poet and short story author (born 1975)

- Born: 1975 (age 50–51)
- Occupations: Writer; poet; translator
- Writing career
- Genre: Fiction

Mary O'Donoghue (born 1975) is an Irish fiction writer, poet, and translator.

== Life and career ==
Mary O'Donoghue grew up in County Clare, Ireland.

She is professor of English in the Arts and Humanities division at Babson College, Massachusetts and senior fiction editor at the literary journal AGNI. In 2023 she held the Heimbold Chair of Irish Studies at Villanova University.

== Writings ==
Her short story collection The Hour After Happy Hour is published by Stinging Fly Press (2023); her novel Before the House Burns] appeared in 2010.

Her short stories have been published in Granta, SUBTROPICS, Georgia Review, Irish Times, Kenyon Review, The Common, Dublin Review, and elsewhere.

Her poetry collections are Tulle (2001) and Among These Winters (2007). Her translations of Irish-language poet Seán Ó Ríordáin appeared in Selected Poems from Yale University Press (Margellos World Republic of Letters) in 2014. Across several years and bilingual volumes, she has collaborated with Louis de Paor on translations of his poetry, most recently The Brindled Cat and the Nightingale’s Tongue (Bloodaxe Books, 2014).

== Recognition and residencies ==
Mary O'Donoghue's writing awards include two artist's fellowships from Massachusetts Cultural Council (2006 and 2012) and the Irish Times/ Legends of the Fall prize for short fiction responding to Ireland's economic crisis (2013).

She has held residencies at Vermont Studio Center and Virginia Center for the Creative Arts.
