= Ursula O'Farrell =

Irish author and lecturer (1934–2022)

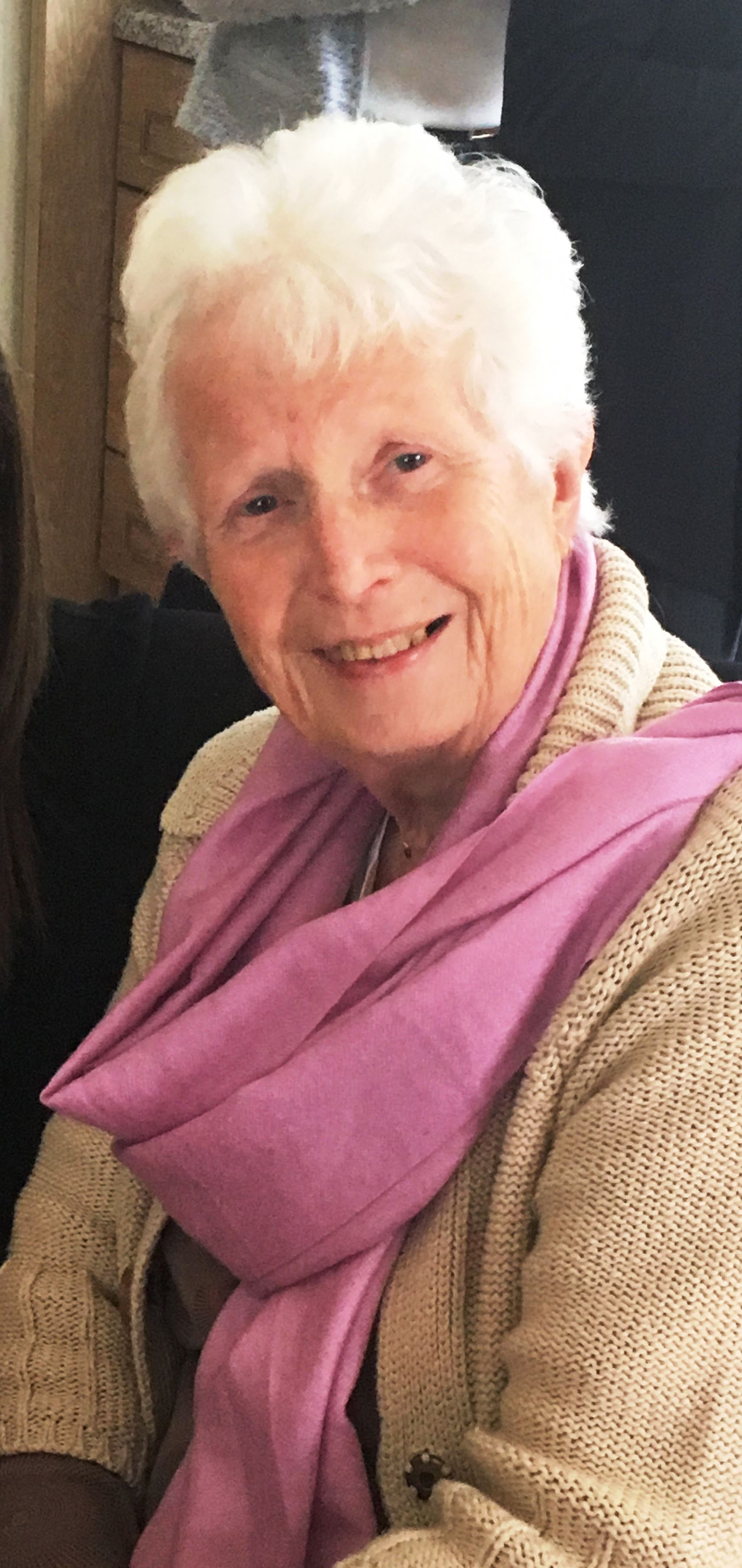
- O'Farrell in 2016

Personal details
- Born: Ursula Cussen; 24 May 1934 Newcastle West, County Limerick, Ireland
- Died: 6 January 2022 (aged 87)
- Parents: Robert Cussen; Kathleen (Kitsie) McCartan
- Education: University College Dublin
- Profession: Counsellor

Ursula O'Farrell (née Cussen, 24 May 1934 – 6 January 2022) was an Irish author and lecturer on the topic of counselling who worked for over 35 years as a counsellor.

== Life and career ==
Born in Newcastle West, County Limerick, Ireland, in 1934, and daughter of local solicitors, Robert and Kathleen Cussen, Ursula O'Farrell was educated in Laurel Hill School in Limerick, and subsequently in University College Dublin where she achieved a B.A (1956) and a Dip in Psychology (1981).

She is one of the founding members of the Irish Association for Counselling in 1981, along with Odette Thompson (founder of the Hanly Centre for Addiction in Dun Laoghaire, Ireland in 1978), Ita McCraith, Joan McGowan and Kay Duffy. Carl Berkeley also played a pivotal role in the Association's beginnings [1]. Ursula O'Farrell was Cathaoirleach of the Irish Association for Counselling from 1991 to 1995, which became the Irish Association for Counselling and Psychotherapy

O'Farrell set up her own private practice in the early 1980s, having successfully completed a two-year Diploma in Psychology at UCD. ‘I was a fledgling counsellor … It was thrilling, I loved every busy minute of it … but it was terrifying too.’ [2] At that time in Ireland there was a stigma attached to mental illness and to the idea of being in need of counselling. Today it is generally realised that professional help can be invaluable, and much of this change of attitude, according to the former President of Ireland Mary McAleese, is due to the ″hard work and dedication of the Irish Association for Counselling and Psychotherapy″.

O'Farrell wrote four books on counselling, and also compiled a book of some of the 'Topical Talks' written by her late husband Myles O'Farrell, which featured in the 1960s RTÉ (Ireland's National Television and Radio Broadcaster) radio series of the same name. In her best known work, 'First Steps in Counselling', which offers a comprehensive coverage of all aspects of counselling, and has been updated in later additions, to take account of the many changes in Ireland since its first publication in 1988, she states: If people are not satisfied with their lives as they are, they look for a different tomorrow. They are searching for change. In 'Considering Counselling' O'Farrell provides an introduction to the Person-Centred Approach pioneered by Carl Rogers, explaining the basic theory and practice of this approach using some fascinating case studies.

Ursula O'Farrell died on 6 January 2022, at the age of 87.

== Awards and honours ==
Recipient of the Carl Berkeley Memorial Award in 2011 This annual award is made to those who have made an outstanding contribution to the development of counselling and psychotherapy in Ireland.

== List of works ==
- O'Farrell, Ursula. (1988). First Steps in Counselling (Veritas Books ISBN 9781853900655)
- O'Farrell, Ursula. (1998). Considering Counselling: The Person Centred Approach (Veritas Books ISBN 1853908401 ) Provides an introduction to the Person-Centred Approach, pioneered by Carl Rogers.
- O'Farrell, Ursula. (1999). Courage to Change: The Counselling Process (Veritas Books ISBN 1853904392 )
- O'Farrell, Ursula and Sarah McLoughlin. (2008). Families in Focus: Finding Solutions to Difficult Problems (Veritas Books ISBN 1847300480 )
- O'Farrell, Ursula. (2011). Looking Towards The Past: Topical Talks of the 60s. Written by Myles O'Farrell, and compiled by Ursula O'Farrell (a compilation, in print form, of a selection of 30 x 5-minute radio broadcasts).
- O'Farrell, Ursula. (2012). Letters to the Editor – Eisteach – A Quarterly Journal of Counselling and Psychotherapy. Autumn 2012 (p27)
- O'Farrell, Ursula. (2013). Letters to the Editor – Eisteach – A Quarterly Journal of Counselling and Psychotherapy. Summer 2013 (p29) http://www.irish-counselling.ie/eisteach-IACP-quarterly-journals
- Eisteach – A Quarterly Journal of Counselling and Psychotherapy. Spring 2017 (pg 27) Ceremony to welcome newly accredited members, along with the past Carl Berkeley Memorial Award Recipients and past Cathaoirligh
- COONSELLING [sic] The Irish Times, 17 Aug 1990, 11
- Counselling services (2000) The Irish Times
- Give your problems a little space Irish Times, 29 Nov 2005 .... counsellors Ursula O'Farrell and Sarah McLoughlin have launched Meeting Space, a service for families, organisations and groups...
- wrong and psychotherapy by Ursula O'Farrell The Irish Times, 19 Jul 2007,
