= Máighréad Medbh =

Irish writer and poet

- Born: 1959 (age 66–67); Newcastle West, County Limerick, Ireland
- Occupation: Writer
- Writing career
- Genre: Poetry

Máighréad Medbh (born 1959) is an Irish writer and poet.

== Life and work ==
Born in 1959 in Newcastle West, County Limerick, Medbh now lives in Dublin. She is known as a performative poet and much of her focus has been on live performance since the 1990s, when she was a pioneer in the Irish performance renascence. She has published eight poetry collections and a mixed genre work, as well as three e-novels. She has won awards, including the Single Poem Prize Listowel Writers’ Week 2016, for 'Easter 2016,' and her verse fantasy, Parvit of Agelast, was shortlisted for the Pigott Poetry Prize in 2017. She has been awarded a bursary from the Irish Arts Council, and has had several school residencies. She collaborated with writers Deirdre Brennan and Nuala Ní Chonchúir on the volume of poetry, Divas! (2003).

== Bibliography ==
- Imbolg. (Dublin: Arlen House, 2020)
- Parvit of Agelast: A Verse Fantasy. (Dublin: Arlen House, 2016)
- Pagan to the Core (Dublin, Arlen House, 2014)
- Savage Solitude: Reflections of a Reluctant Loner (Dublin: Dedalus Press, 2013)
- Twelve Beds for the Dreamer (Dublin, Arlen House, 2010)
- When the Air Inhales You (Galway, Arlen House, 2009)
- Split in ¡Divas!. (Galway: Arlen House, 2003)
- CD: Out of My Skin Dublin: Odin Poetries, 2002
- Tenant (The Cliffs of Moher, Salmon Poetry, 1999)
- The Making of a Pagan (Belfast, Blackstaff Press, 1990)

E-Books

- The 13th Cone (2014)
- The Coal-black Sea (2013)
- The Body Coat (2013)

Máighréad Medbh: Smashwords Page

Film Collaborations
With artist Bernie Masterson--

- Flight. Winner of the Janet Mullarney Prize 2020
- Bold Writing. Selected for screening by MExIndex 2020

Flight screenings:
Lacuna Festivals 2021 International, Contemporary Art Festival: Distance (02-07-2021); MESA Magazine online launch (27-03-2021); The Royal Ulster Academy Annual Exhibition (18-10-2020); Contemporary Irish Arts Center Los Angeles, CIACLA (24-09-2020).
Flight was winner of the Inaugural Janet Mullarney Prize, curated by Joy Gerrard, Séan Kissane, and Jerome O Drisceoil for the Highlanes Gallery, Drogheda (06-07-2020), and has been acquired by The Highlanes for its permanent collection.
Bold Writing screenings:
Mexindex 2020, curated by Richard Ashrowan (18-12-2020); as part of Homeland: ‘On Changing Your Mind’, at: Instituto Cervantes, Dublin (24-11-2019), the LOOP Festival, Barcelona (22-11-2019), and Damer House Gallery, Roscrea (10-08-2019); Glitch Festival, Digital Traces, (17-05-2017); Discover Hidden Gems, MFA Group Show, The Annex, 101 -103 James St, Dublin (06-07-2016).

For Children

- The Rescue, a four-part serialised story for children, set to music by Fergal Carroll, was broadcast on Ireland’s Lyric FM radio station in December 2007 and December 2008.

Translations
English versions of original poems in Galician and Arabic have been included in the following anthologies:

- Migrant Shores: Irish, Moroccan & Galician Poetry. Edited by Manuela Palacios. Co. Clare: Salmon Poetry, 2017
- Forked Tongues: Galician, Basque and Catalan Women’s Poetry in Translations by Irish Writers. Edited by Manuela Palacios. Bristol: Shearsman Books, 2012
- To The Winds Our Sails: Irish Writers Translate Galician Poetry. Edited by Mary O’Donnell and Manuela Palacios. Co. Clare: Salmon Poetry, 2010

Anthologies in which work has been published

- Reading the Future: New Writing from Ireland. Dublin: Arlen House, 2018
- Washing Windows? Irish Women Write Poetry. Dublin: Arlen House, 2017
- Stony Thursday Book 2015. Edited by Mary O’Donnell. Limerick Arts Office, 2015
- And Agamemnon Dead: An Anthology of Early Twenty First Century Irish Poetry. Edited by Peter O’Neill & Walter Ruhlmann. Paris: Muavaise Graine, 2015
- Dream of a City: An Anthology of Contemporary Poetry from Limerick City of Culture. 2014. Astrolabe Press, 2014
- The Stony Thursday Book No. 13, Autumn 2014. Edited by Peter Sirr. Limerick Arts Office, 2014
- What We Found There: Poets Respond to the Treasures of the National Museum of Ireland. Edited by Theo Dorgan. Dublin: Dedalus Press, 2013
- The Stony Thursday Book No. 12. Edited by Paddy Bushe. Limerick Arts Office, 2013
- The Blue Max Review. Rebel Poetry, Fermoy International Poetry Festival, 2013
- Shine On. Edited by Pat Boran. Dublin: Dedalus Press, 2011
- Dogs Singing. Edited by Jessie Lendennie. Co. Clare: Salmon Poetry, 2010
- Salmon: A Journey in Poetry. Edited by Jessie Lendennie. Co. Clare: Salmon Poetry, 2007
- Something Beginning with P. Edited by Seamus Cashman. Dublin: O’Brien Press, 2004
- Forgotten Light. Edited by Louise C. Callaghan. Dublin: A. & A. Farmar, 2003
- The Field Day Anthology of Irish Writing: Volumes IV & V: Irish Women's Writing and Traditions. Edited by Angela Bourke et al. Cork: Cork University Press, 2002
- Short Fuse: The Global Anthology of New Fusion Poetry. Edited by Todd Swift & Philip Norton. New York: Rattapallax Press, 2002
- The White Page / An Bhileog Bhán. Edited by Joan McBreen. Galway: Salmon Publishing, 1999
- An Cloigeann is a Luach / What Worth the Head. Edited by Evelyn Conlon. Limerick: Limerick County Council, 1998
- Nautilus Literarischer Taschenkalender 1996. Edited by Jürgen Schneider, Hamburg: Nautilus, 1996
- Poems in My Earphone. Collected by John Agard. Harlow, Essex: Longman Literature, 1995
- Hearsay: Performance Poems Plus. Compiled by Paul Beasley. London: Bodley Head Children's Books, 1994
- Ireland's Women: Writings Past and Present. Selected by Katie Donovan, A. Norman Jeffares & Brendan Kennelly. Dublin: Gill & MacMillan, 1994
- The Popular Front of Contemporary Poetry. Edited by Paul Beasley. London: Apples & Snakes, 1992
- I Wouldn't Thank you for a Valentine. Edited by Carol Ann Duffy. London: Viking / Penguin 1992
- The Virago Book of Wicked Verse. Edited by Jill Dawson. London: Virago, 1992
- Irrlandt, Ireland, Irland. ed. Jürgen Schneider. Berlin: Druckhaus Galrev, 1992

Prose and Essay

- Monthly Blog on Website 2012-2020
- Prose piece in New Planet Cabaret, ed. Dave Lordan. Dublin: RTE, 2013
- Essay included in Irish Spirit, ed. Patricia Monahan. Dublin: Wolfhound Press, 2001
