= Norah Meade =

Irish journalist and humanitarian

Norah Meade Corcoran
- Born: 1888; Dublin, Ireland
- Died: 23 January 1954 (aged 65–66); Grangegorman, Ireland
- Occupations: Writer and journalist
- Writing career
- Pen name: Norah Meade Corcoran, Norah Meade, Norah Corcoran

Norah Meade Corcoran (1888-23 January 1954) was an Irish journalist and humanitarian.

== Career ==
Norah Meade was born in Dublin, Ireland, to Patrick Meade, a journalist. In 1912, at age 24, she emigrated to the United States on the RMS Lusitania.

She wrote reviews, fiction stories and investigative stories for newspapers and magazines both in Ireland and the United States. She wrote under her maiden and married names, Norah Meade, Norah Corcoran and Norah Meade Corcoran.

While living in Ireland she wrote for such publications as the Weekly Freeman. An example of her work is the critique of Peadar Ua Laoghaire in "The Contemporary Irish National Movement in Literature" in 1910.

Once she moved to the US, she wrote for a wide number of papers and on a wide number of topics. Her New York World (magazine section) column was syndicated in other papers like the Fort Wayne Journal-Gazette in Indiana. Meade also wrote freelance for such titles as The Boston Globe.

Meade was involved in the American Relief Administration. She was a witness to the Russian Famine in 1921 and worked with Herbert Hoover to provide relief.

She returned to the United States again after a trip to Europe in 1923 sailing on the RMS Homeric. On this trip she was already married.

While based in the US Meade also worked with Harry Gilchriese on publicity for the Girl Scouts of the USA from 1929 to 1937. She wrote articles for the Girl Scouts which appeared across the country.

Meade returned to Ireland in 1952 and was living in Dublin until her death in 1954.

== Reviews and articles ==
- Impressions of Soviet Russia and the Revolutionary World, Mexico - China - Turkey, reviewed in the Saturday review of Literature 4 May 1929.
- Anna Livia Plurabelle reviewed "nonesense of new art" New York Herald Tribune Books 13 September 1931.
- Barbara Wiedemann (1998). Josephine Herbst's Short Fiction: A Window to Her Life and Times. Associated University Presse. pp. 137. ISBN 9781575910079.
- Biography Review by Norah Meade of My Life by Leon Trotsky. The Bookman. July 1930. p. 448.
- Fiction Review by Norah Meade This Strange Adventure by Mary Roberts Rinehart. The Bookman. August 1929. p. 663.
- The Pittsburgh Press - May 21, 1916
- Catholic Girl Scouting, Catholic World 145 (1937)
