= A. Garland Mears =

Irish novelist

Amelia Garland Mears
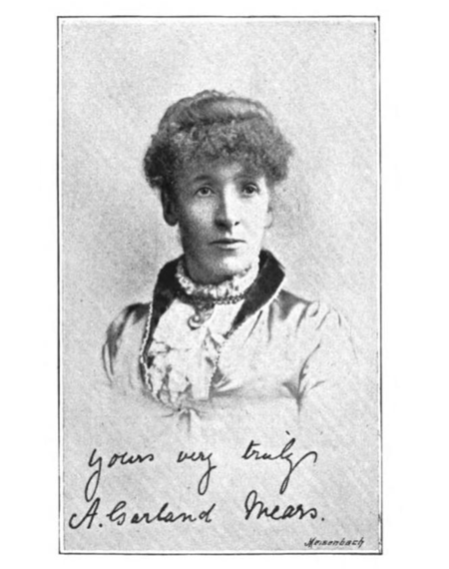
- Mears portrait from Idylls, Legends and Lyrics (1890)
- Born: Amelia Garland; 1842; Freshford, County Kilkenny
- Died: 3 January 1920 (aged 77–78); Leeds, England
- Occupation: novelist

Amelia Garland Mears (1842–1920), who published as A. Garland Mears, was an Irish novelist. Her work dealt with issues such as gender equality, sexist attitudes and sexual harassment. Mears was also referred to as "finding new ground in sci-fi for over 100 years".

== Early life and family ==
Amelia Garland Mears was born in Freshford, County Kilkenny in 1842. Mears lived in the town land Freshford Lots in the Crannagh Barony. She was one of five children, with two older sisters, Elizabeth and Jane, an older brother John and a younger brother Charles. Mears's parents' "ancestors came over to Britain with William the conqueror". The Garland family left Ireland and moved to Liverpool around 1848. Mears spent much of her life in the north of England. The family moved to Dronfield, Derbyshire, as her father, John Garland, secured a job there. He was the second master of the grammar school Dronfield, near Sheffield for 25 years. He died on 1 December 1878 and was the author of many unpublished poems.

Amelia married Edward Mears in West Hartlepool Merchant, Durham on 22 February in 1864. Edward Mears was a hardware man, jeweller, and a dealer in toys and fancy goods. He was born in 1825 and originally from York and was the son of John Mears and Elizabeth Reynalds. They had three children: Edward, born in 1865, Amelia Mary, born in 1868, and Edith Jane Mears, born in 1869. Mears's son Edward obtained high class Latin honours in school while still in his teens.

Mears spent a lot of time in the Dronfield Public Library and also attended science and literature classes through the Cambridge University Extension Scheme. Mears and her husband were both awarded certificates at the Cambridge and Durham University local lectures for a distinction in electricity in 1883. The family lived on 22 Lynn Street in Hartlepool, Stranton Durham. They had a servant, Elizabeth L. Hist, who was later charged with stealing a pair of Ms. Mears' stockings in 1894; the family did not press charges however In later life, Mears moved to Leeds.

== Career ==
At an early age, she started reading without any previous schooling. She published four novels within 5 years from 1890 to 1895. She has been described as the poet of love and nature. It has been said her writing is greatly influenced by the writings of Sir Walter Scott. She wrote special stories for various journals and had time to attend science and literature classes.

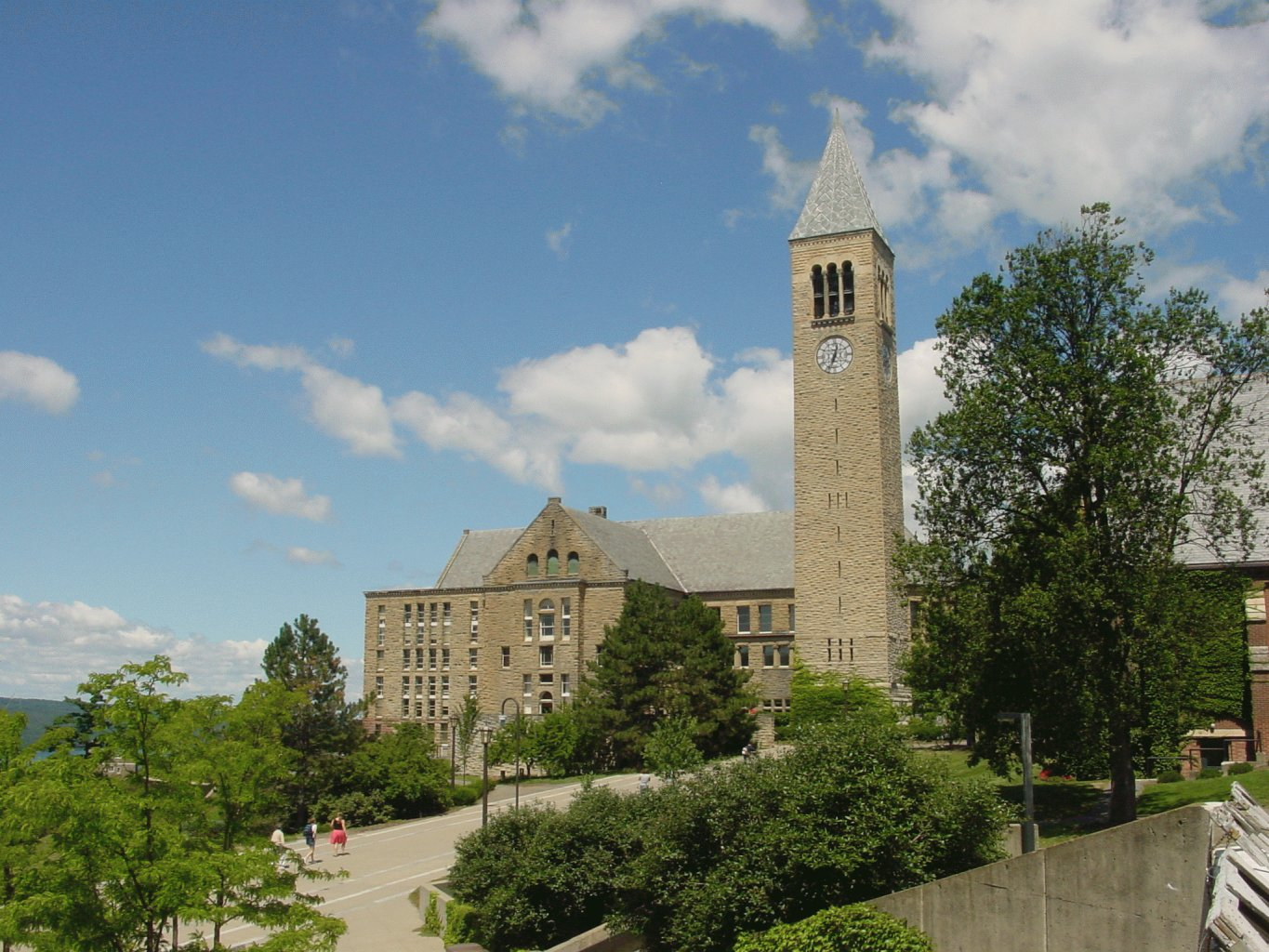
Cornell University Library in Ithaca, New York

Mears released her debut novel Idylls, Legends and Lyrics in 1890. The novel was originally published by Kegan Paul, Trench, Trübner & Co. Ltd, a publishing house located in London, England. The novel is a collection of short stories and poems, focusing on historic myths and themes of humanity and life, inspired by her experience living in West Hartlepool, England, where she met and married her husband. In her preface she speaks about music and her objective of this novel "and in the idylls the pictures portrayed of human life and of human love I trust will prove pleasurable contemplation to the reader". The original copy of the book currently resides in the Cornell University Library in Ithaca, New York.

She followed up her debut novel three years later with the release of The Story of a Trust and Other Tales (1893). This novel marked her departure from her original publishing house and her first release with London-based publishers Simpkin, Marshall, Hamilton, Kent & Co. Ltd, who would later also publish her following two books. Later that year, Mears released her third novel, Tales of Our Town (1893).

Mears is best remembered for Mercia, the Astronomer Royal: A Romance, her final published work which was released in 1895. The novel has been described as "an odd mixture of feminism, Theosophy, 'unhand me, dastardly villain' sexual encounters, and the wives of Henry VIII." The story takes place in a utopian world during the year 2002 in which women are physically and socially equal to men. It follows a romantic plot in a future Europe dominated by Germanic races. The book is significant for its feminist themes and strong portrayal of women during the Victorian era. The book highlights women in a powerful light at the face of a science-fiction setting, something that would have been uncommon in its genre and literature in general at the time.

== Later life and death ==
Mears' son, Edward, married Mary Florence Quincey in 1889 and they had five sons. He was the Rector of St Katherine's Parish, Uttlesford district, Essex from 1906 to 1940. He was also the founder and first warden of St Paul 1910 to 1940. He died on 11 June 1947 and was buried in St Katherine's churchyard.

Amelia Mary Mears was a student of science and literature. She began working in a jewellery shop but as of 1911, still resided in Leeds, Yorkshire with no occupation. She also never married and was categorised as a spinster.

Mears moved to Leeds, Yorkshire-West Riding, having been widowed when her husband died in 1868, aged 56. She died in Leeds on 3 January 1920 from "Bronchitis senile decay"; she is buried in Leeds general cemetery at Woodhouse.

== Legacy ==
Her work has recently been republished in the book A Brilliant Void: A Selection of Classic Irish Science Fiction, published by Tramp Press and though it dates back to the 19th Century, has been described as "anything but old school". The editor of the volume, Jack Fennell, explains that her work deals with issues such as gender equality, sexist attitudes and sexual harassment while warning the reader that "advances in social equality will have to be defended". Mears has also been referred to as "finding new ground in sci-fi for over 100 years".
