= Caitilin Dubh =

Irish poet

Caitilin Dubh, Irish poet, fl. c. 1624.

Caitilin Dubhh is one of a very small number of pre-18th-century Irish female poets. Her surname is unknown; dubh is a nickname.

Liam P. O Murchu (2003, p. 149) says "The absence of a surname points to her probable low social status; as the theme of wandering from place to place is found in some of the poems, it is possible that she was recognised as a semi-professional keening woman who went where her services were needed. She seems to have operated on the periphery of the literary culture of the early seventeenth century, and the poems ascribed to her provide an intriguingt insight into the possibility of female authorship at a period in Irish literary history when the official practise of poetry was still a predominantly male preserve. In personality she seems to have been agreeable, but formidable."

== Works ==
Five surviving compositions, all elegies, are known to be by her. They survived in a 17th-century collection of poems addressed to the O'Briens of Thomond, the individuals concerned being:

- Donogh O'Brien, 4th Earl of Thomond, died 1624
- Dermod O'Brien, 5th Baron Inchiquin, died 1624, the subject of two elegies
- Maire O'Brien, daughter of the 3rd Earl of Thomond
- Toirdhealbhach Rua Mac Mathghamhna, husband of the above, died 1629.

Caitilin's poems on Inchiquin, Maire, and Mac Mathghamhna "contain sentiments of personal loss and, addressing the deceased in the first person, convey a sense of familiar acquaintance. It was this familiarity, combined with Caitilin Dubh's sureness of touch in the elegiac genre, that ensured the preservation of her poems in manuscript form." (O Murchu, p. 149).

== See also ==
Other medieval-early modern Irish literary women included:

- Uallach ingen Muinecháin, died 934
- Sadhbh Ó Mailchonaire, Ollamh Síol Muireadaigh, 1441–1447
- Mary Bonaventure Browne, c. 1610 – c. 1670
- Laetitia Pilkington, c. 1709 – 1750
