= Máirín Diamond =

Máirín Diamond (born 1957), is an Irish poet.

Diamond grew up in Renvyle, County Galway, and she studied Literature and Philosophy at the University of Sussex in England. She presently lives in Dublin.

Her collection, The Testimony of Bones, which was begun in 1984, is a cycle of three poems. It focuses on the Great Famine (Ireland) as the defining event of modern Irish history.

== Bibliography ==
- The Testimony of Bones, Wideawake Press, Dublin, 2000. ISBN 0-9533857-0-1
- Rock Shadow, 2005. ISBN 0-9533857-1-X
