= Caitríona Ní Chléirchín =

Irish writer

Caitríona Ní Chléirchín is an Irish writer. Born in Emyvale, County Monaghan, Ní Chléirchín's first collection was published in 2010. This collection, Crithloinnir, won first prize in the Oireachtas competition for new writers 2010. An Bhrídeach Sí, her second collection of poetry, received the Michael Hartnett Prize in 2015. Her collection titled Rince Aeir published by Éabhlóid was nominated for the 2025 Gradam Uí Shúilleabháin awards. She is an Irish-language lecturer at Dublin City University.
