= Ellen Forrester =

- Born: Ellen Magennis; 1828; Clones, County Monaghan
- Died: 6 January 1883 (aged 54–55); Belfast
- Resting place: Salford, Greater Manchester

Ellen Forrester (1828 – 1883) was an Irish nationalist and poet.

== Life ==
Ellen Forrester was born Ellen Magennis in 1828, probably in Clones, County Monaghan. She was the sixth of seven children of the local schoolmaster, Bernard Magennis. She was baptised on 26 December 1828. She was educated by her father, and considered to have inherited her poetical talent from her mother, a Presbyterian who then converted to Catholicism. One of her brothers was the Irish journalist, Bernard Magennis (1833–1911), editor of the Dublin publication, the Social Mirror.

Ellen Magennis moved to England at age 17, working as a nursery governess in Liverpool. She then moved to Manchester, marrying a stonemason, Michael Forrester on 24 October 1847, at Leeds parish church. Michael Forrester drank heavily, and died of consumption at a young age in 1865, leaving Forrester with 5 children aged from 10 years and younger.

== Poetry ==
She had written poetry most of her life, so to support her family she began submitting verse to English and Irish journals. Three of her children also wrote poetry: Arthur Forrester (1850-1895), Fanny Forrester (1852-1889), and Mary (b. 1857). Forrester was a committed nationalist, and helped Caroline Douglas raise money for the defence fund for the Manchester Martyrs. Her son Arthur joined the Irish Republican Brotherhood in 1866 and was a leading Lancashire Fenian. She sought help from her friend, Michael Davitt, when Arthur was arrested in 1869. During Davitt's own imprisonment in Millbank penitentiary, he requested permission for Forrester to visit him but this was denied as she was deemed to be a "notorious Fenian-sympathiser."

Around 1860 Forrester published her first volume of poetry, Simple strains. This was followed by a collection of songs in 1869, Songs of the rising nation, which also included verse from Arthur and Fanny Forrester. Towards the end of her life Forrester struggled with poverty and poor health, but according to accounts of her life she was in continuing good humour. in 1872 she applied to the Royal Literary Fund describing herself as a "cripple" and dependant on her two daughters who worked in factories. This application was rejected. She died on 6 January 1883 in Salford, she was buried in a local Catholic cemetery.

== Commemoration ==
In April 2022, her biography was published by the Oxford Dictionary of National Biography, alongside that of her daughter and fellow poet Fanny Forrester.
