= Fanny Forrester (English poet) =

19th century English poet

- Born: 1852; Manchester, England
- Died: August 1889 (aged 36–37); Manchester

Fanny Forrester (1852 – August 1889) was an English poet of Irish heritage.

== Early life ==
Fanny Forrester was born in 1852 in Manchester, England. She was the eldest daughter of Michael, a stonemason, and the poet Ellen Forrester (née Magennis). Both of her parents were Irish. She had four siblings, including Arthur and Mary, who would also go on to write poetry. Her father died when Forrester was 8 years old, resulting in her mother writing to support the family. Forrester is described as being very close to her mother.

== Poetry ==
Forrester became a factory dye-worker in Pendleton. She published poetry in a number of periodicals, including Ben Brierley's Journal, Nation, Quiver, and Chamber's Journal. In Ben Brierley's Journal alone she published around 60 poems between 1870 and 1876, and the journal featured an account of Forrester in 1875 with a portrait in which she is described as "one of our most popular contributors". When her mother applied for funds from the Royal Literary Fund she described her daughter as "only nineteen years of age" and has "written more than I have - and better too". Her work represents the experiences of the poor and alienated working class with themes of the urban versus the rural and at times invokes the Irish countryside. The poems feature people on the margins of society, such as orphans, disabled people, "fallen" women, and immigrants.

Forrester's obituary on 12 August 1889 in the Manchester Weekly Times noted that she had an unhappy marriage, with her sister commenting that her life "was not a happy one ... Her death was sad and sudden".

== Commemoration ==
In April 2022, her biography was published by the Oxford Dictionary of National Biography, alongside that of her mother, poet Ellen Forrester, and brother, writer and Fenian campaigner Arthur Marshall Forrester.
