= Olivia Elder =

Irish poet

- Born: 21 January 1735 or 1739; Aghadowey, County Londonderry
- Died: 1780 (aged 44–45); Aghadowey

Olivia Elder (21 January 1735 - 1780) was an Irish poet.

== Early life and family ==
Olivia Elder was born on 21 January in probably 1735, or maybe 1739. She was the daughter of the Presbyterian minister of Aghadowey in north County Londonderry, Rev. John Elder (1693–1779). Her mother's name is unknown, and it appears that she had at least one brother. Her father joined with Michael Bruce, John Abernethy, James Kirkpatrick and Samuel Haliday as part of the non-subscribing presbytery of Antrim in 1726. Elder received a high level of education, probably at home. She had some Greek and Latin, and had a great love of literature which led her to composing verses and writing verse letters to her friends. Given that she was a Presbyterian, her strong views on morality is a recurring them in her poetry. She also took part in inter- and intra-denominational argument with zeal. Elder lived her entire life with her father, working as his housekeeper until his death.

== Poetry ==
Elder was hopeful that her work would be published, so she made careful copies of her poems in a notebook. She wrote in a range of forms including elegies, odes, epistles and even songs. One of her poems, a vicious satire of Robert Heyland, the Church of Ireland rector of Coleraine, was published anonymously in the Freeman's Journal (29 June 1772). She sought the acquaintance of the English poet, Anna Laetitia Barbauld, in 1774 as they shared a liberal dissenting background. Perhaps due to her upbringing in a robustly egalitarian rural community, Elder did not care much for urban proprieties of diction or social politeness, unlike poets like Barbauld. A number of her poems relay enmities and misunderstandings. At times she is thoughtlessly rude, but in other rather insulting, provoking shock in her readers even to this day. She accuses local gentry, ministers, and clergymen of moral shortcomings and having many vices. She was familiar with the Scots language and seems to have known some of its earlier literature. In general, Elder seems to have a low opinion of men, having been "cruelly deceiv’d" in love. With the exception of her father, she viewed all men as untrustworthy deceivers and seducers, whereas she wrote of most women as hard-working and honourable.

"An elegy on J. S. …" was one of her most successful poems, and was a parody of an Allan Ramsay's verse as a six-line standard Burns stanza written in strong Scots. Her use of direct speech offers a glimpse of relationships and social occasions in rural communities in the early 18th century from a woman's perspective. She is scathing of marriage with vivid and unflattering descriptions, like in works such as "Matrimony at the throne", presenting a spouse as drunken, with a domineering and critical tyrant brother, as an appalling matrimonial option for an intelligent woman. "To Mrs A. C. H. an account of the Authors manner of spending her time" is regarded as one of her best works. In this poem she relays the distractions of everyday tasks and responsibilities, themes which later women writers invoke strongly. Elder is humorous and rueful at her life as a woman artist, while also taking pride in her homemaking skills.

== Later life and legacy ==
Elder died in 1780 after suffering with ill health for a long period. The family preserved her notebook, which was passed to James Henry, who may have been a grand-nephew. Her works remained only available in manuscript in the National Library of Ireland. They were published as a volume of poetry in 2017.
