= Isabel Grubb =

Irish historian (1881–1972)

- Born: 20 September 1881
- Died: 1972 (aged 90–91)
- Occupation: Historian

Isabel Grubb (20 September 1881 – 1972) was an Irish historian, who studied the Quakers in Ireland. She became a major authority on the subject.

== Life and work ==
Isabel was born in 1881 to Joseph Ernest Grubb and Hannah Rebecca Jacob, corn merchants and Quakers in Carrick-on-Suir, Ireland.

She gained her master's degree from the University of London in 1916 with a thesis about Irish Quakerism: "Social conditions in Ireland in the seventeenth and eighteenth centuries, as illustrated by early Quaker records. She later studied at Woodbrooke Quaker Study Centre and became a fellow there in 1926. She taught at Mountmellick School in around 1911. She also taught in a handful of British schools, including Sidcot School (1920–1924).

Grubb worked within the Society and as curator and clerk in the Historical Library of the Religious Society of Friends in Ireland, resigning only in 1955, as the commute from where she lived in Waterford had become too much for her. Her work there meant she was also travelling around the world.

As a historian and Quaker, Grubb was the main authority on the subject in Ireland.

== Bibliography ==
- Quakerism and Industry before 1800 (1930)
- Quakers in Ireland, 1654–1900 (1927)
- Quaker Homespuns, 1655–1833
- J. Ernest Grubb of Carrick-on-Suir (1928)
- My Irish Journal, 1669–1670 by William Penn; edited by Isabel Grubb with an introduction by Henry J. Cadbury
