= Sybil le Brocquy =

Irish playwright, patron of the arts and conservationist

- Born: 21 December 1892; Dublin, Ireland
- Died: 4 September 1973 (aged 80); Dublin, Ireland
- Occupation: Writer
- Writing career
- Genre: Plays

Sybil le Brocquy (21 December 1892 – 4 September 1973) was an Irish playwright, patron of the arts and conservationist. Two of her three children were involved with the arts: a son was the painter Louis le Brocquy and her daughter was the sculptor Melanie le Brocquy.

== Life and work ==
Born Helen Mary Sybil Staunton in Herbert Street, Dublin to Dorothy Eleanor Redington and Peter Maurice Staunton. Her father was barrister who later became a solicitor. Though he moved to Aram Lodge, Castlerea, County Roscommon where he practised law, le Brocquy grew up in Dublin and Howth, going to secondary school in Loreto Abbey, Rathfarnham, and later at Loreto Convent, St. Stephen’s Green. She went on to study German and singing in Coblenz. She married Albert le Brocquy on 30 December 1915 and settled in Dublin. They had three children, Louis, Noel and Melanie.

le Brocquy became involved in various women's movements helping to organise the Women's International League for Peace and Freedom in July, 1926. She was involved with the League of Nations Association as well as helping to establish Irish Civil Rights, PEN, and Amnesty in Ireland. She was an active member of Old Dublin Society and for a time president of the Irish Women Writers’ Society. She acted with the Drama League appearing as Helen Staunton. She wrote plays and dramatic pieces which were staged by the Drama League at the Abbey Theatre and broadcast by Radio Éireann.

Her writings and work were often historically investigative, finding Yeats’s birthplace and arguing that Swift had a child by Vanessa. She was involved in the Swift Tercentenary celebrations with Cearbhall Ó Dálaigh. As a result of her work, including with Trinity College Dublin Library and representing the Library on the Royal Irish Academy’s National Committee for Anglo-Irish Literature, she was co-opted to the Cultural Committee of the Department of External Affairs and appointed a Trustee of the National Library of Ireland. le Brocquy was an excellent organiser and fundraiser and was heavily responsible for securing money for the Gate Theatre, Dublin in 1970. She also initiated the literary prize, the Book of the Year award.

However le Brocquy became ill with an undiagnosed illness and died on 4 September 1973 at the Meath Hospital, Dublin.

== Bibliography ==
- Winning Ways (Drama League 1931), MS in NLI
- View on Vanessa: A Correspondence with Interludes for the Stage (Dublin: The Dolmen Press 1967)
- Cadenus: A Reassessment in the Light of New Evidence of the Relationships between Swift, Stella, and Vanessa (Dublin: Dolmen 1962), xiii
- Stella’s Birthdays Poems by Jonathan Swift / edited with a commentary by Sybil Le Brocquy (Dublin: Dolmen Press 1967) [details];
- Swift’s Most Valuable Friend (Dublin: Dolmen 1968)
- Brendan the Navigator : a synopsis of the legend of his westward voyage, (Dundalk: P.J. Carroll)
