= Mae Leonard =

Irish poet

- Born: Mae Leonard; 1940 (age 85–86) ‘The Parish’, Limerick, Ireland
- Occupations: Poet, Writer

Mae Leonard (born c. 1940) is an Irish poet, writer and broadcaster.

== Life and career ==
Leonard was born about 1940 in Limerick city in an area known as ‘The Parish’. She was educated by the Sisters of Mercy in St Mary's School. After completing a secretarial course in the local technical school, Leonard took a job working for the local corporation and was there for eight years until she married and moved to County Kildare. In Kildare Leonard worked as a swimming teacher while also writing for the local paper. Eventually she took a course in communications and began working for The Evening Press, the national broadcaster RTÉ, The Irish Times and the magazine ‘Ireland's Own’. A short story writer, children's story writer and poet Leonard won the Gerard Manley Hopkins award in 1995 as well as the C. Day Lewis Award for both poetry and short story. She also gives workshops on writing.

== Books ==
- Collection of Children's Stories: Tarzan Clancy (1993)
- My Home is There (1998)
- Poetry: Six for Gold, Poetry Collection (1988)
