= New Island Books =

Irish publishing house

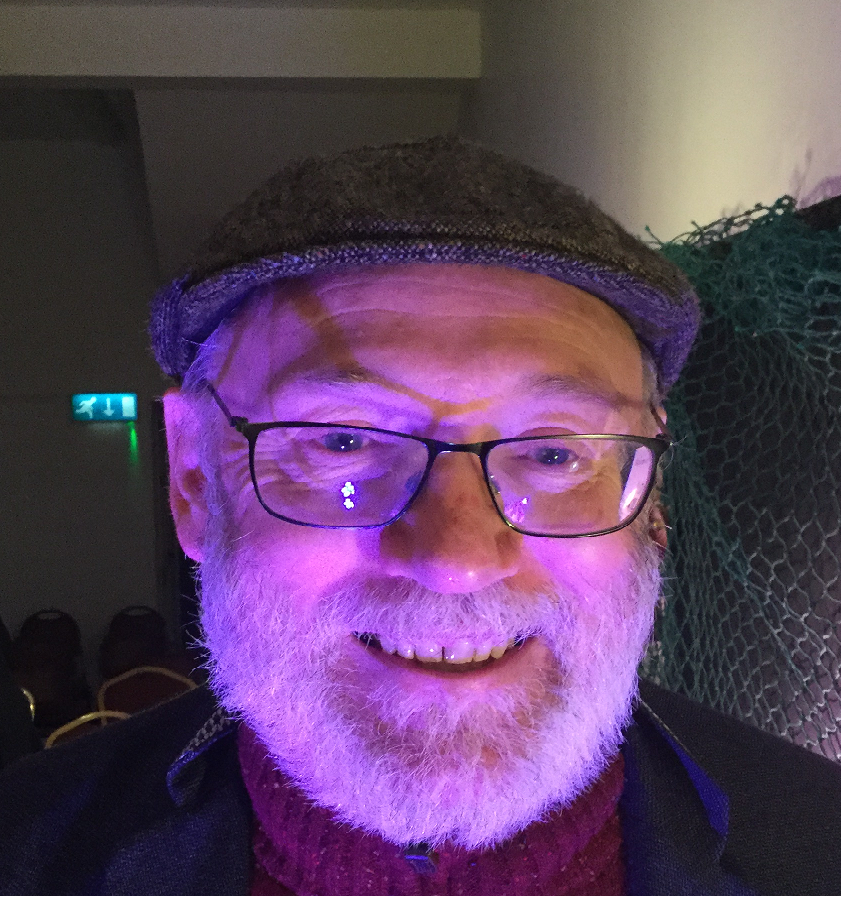
- Dermot Bolger
- Predecessor: Raven Arts Press
- Founded: 1977
- Founder: Dermot Bolger
- Country of origin: Ireland
- Distribution: Gill (Ireland); Head of Zeus (UK); Dufor Editions (US)
- Publication types: Books
- Official website: www.newisland.ie

New Island Books is an independent Irish publisher of literary fiction, poetry, drama, biography, and books on politics and social affairs.

== History ==
Raven Arts Press was founded in 1977 by Dermot Bolger. In 1982, Raven Arts closed, and New Island Books was launched by Bolger with Edwin Higel and Fergal Stanley.

New Island is a member of Publishing Ireland (Clé), the support organisation of Irish publishing, sharing information, expertise and resources.

== Successes ==
New Island has published several bestsellers, including Joseph O'Connor's The Secret World of the Irish Male and Nuala O'Faolain's memoir of the life of an Irishwoman, Are You Somebody?. It has been described as "a major force in Irish publishing.

== Authors ==
- Dermot Bolger
- Anthony Cronin
- Patrick Galvin
- Roddy Doyle
- Nick Hornby
- Martin Malone
- Cecelia Ahern
- Aidan Higgins
- Joseph O'Connor
- Tom MacIntyre
- Christine Dwyer Hickey
- Maeve Binchy
- Mary Kenny
- Richard Downes
- Stephen Price
- Adi Roche
- Rose Doyle
- Nuala Ní Dhomhnaill
- Paul Durcan
- Philip Casey
- Maeve Brennan
- Myles Dungan
- Glenn Patterson
- Brian Lynch
- Nuala Ní Chonchúir
- Nuala O'Faolain
- Bill Long (1932-2010)
