= Rhoda Cosgrave Sivell =

Irish-born Canadian poet and rancher

- Born: Rhoda Cosgrave; 8 September 1874; Rogerston House estate, near Dublin, Ireland
- Died: 19 February 1962 (aged 87)

Rhoda Cosgrave Sivell (8 September 1874 – 19 February 1962), Irish-born Canadian poet and rancher. She is considered the first Canadian cowboy poet.

== Early life and education ==
Rhoda Cosgrave was born on a farm outside Dublin to Francis and Augusta Cosgrave about 1873 or 1874. The family left Ireland in 1881 and landed in Canada. They travelled through Halifax, Brandon, Manitoba and Regina before settling near Whitewood, Saskatchewan. Her father, Frank Cosgrave, was one of the jury for Louis Riel's Trial. In 1899 Cosgrave married William Sivell. They lived initially in Winnipeg and then moved a ranch near Medicine Hat, Alberta for most of their married life. They moved to a cottage nearer Medicine Hat in retirement. Sivell had done duty as a cowboy when her husband was ill. Sivell wrote poetry which was collected and published in a single volume which describes her experiences on the ranges. The book sold well enough that she was able to buy two stallions with the proceeds and it was republished on two occasions during her life. She later wrote an incomplete autobiography of her life on the ranch and the difficulties they faced. Sivell died in a hospital in Medicine Hat in 1962. She was buried in the city. After she had died her poetry was released again and the autobiography was published. Her poems have been published in anthologies like Cowgirl Poetry in 2001 and used as the basis of songs by Almeda (Terry) Bradshaw in 2010.

== Bibliography ==
- VOICES FROM THE RANGE (1911)
