= Anne Burke (writer) =

Irish novelist in the Gothic genre (fl. 1780–1805)

- Occupation: Writer
- Writing career
- Period: 1780-1805
- Genre: Gothic novels

Anne Burke (fl. 1780-1805) was an Irish novelist in the Gothic genre. She was one of the earliest women writers of Gothic fiction.

== Life and work ==
Anne Burke had been a governess and was widowed with a son. She took up writing to support herself and her family. Becoming a writer did not provide the wealth she had hoped for. She applied for relief several times to the Royal Literary Fund from whom she received a total of 13 guineas. As a governess she hoped to set up a school despite having had to nurse her son through smallpox. She wrote multiple successful novels in the Gothic style, though she was known too for her melodramatic style.

Her novel Adela Northington was just one of the huge rise in numbers of new publications in 1796. It was a huge jump from the previous year.

Ela: or The Delusions of the Heart was one of the books translated into multiple other languages. It was reprinted several times. This book may have been an influence on Ann Radcliffe’s The Romance of the Forest. She is sometimes considered one of the key Irish authors in the development of Gothic fiction along with Regina Maria Roche, Mrs F. C. Patrick, Anna Millikin, Catharine Selden, Marianne Kenley, and Sydney Owenson (later Lady Morgan)

== Critical reception ==
English Review /JAS, 1796 p377

Adela Northington; a Novel. In Three Volumes. By Mrs. Burke. pp. 414. 12mo. 10s. boards. Cawthorn, Strand. London, 1796. We wish it came within the limits of this publication to relate the story of Adela Northington, and do justice to its author. We recommend it for its lively fancy and flowing style; proper, impressive, and animated, without affectation. There are many parts of this work that will draw the tear of sensibility; at the same time that there are others that will amuse the more lively reader. The whole is much superior to any thing of the kind that had lately come into our hands before we read [Inchbald's Nature and Art, likewise here reviewed].

Monthly Magazine / JAS, 1801 vol. 11 (1801): 606.

Mr [sic] Burke's 'Elliot, or, the Vicissitudes of Early Life,' is a well-written and pathetic narration.

Burke is one of the "lost" women writers listed by Dale Spender in Mothers of the Novel: 100 Good Women Writers Before Jane Austen.

== Bibliography ==
- Ela; or, The Delusions of the Heart, 1787
- Emilia de St. Aubigne, 1788
- Adela Northington, 1796
- The Sorrows of Edith, 1796
- Elliott; or, Vicissitudes of Early Life, 1800
- The Secret of the Cavern, 1805
