= Mrs. E. M. Field =

Irish novelist who wrote the first historical study of children's literature

Louise Frances Field
- Born: Louise Frances Story; 1856; Cavan, Ireland
- Died: c. 1940
- Other names: Mrs E. M. Field, Louisa Frances Field, Louise Frances Story Field
- Occupation: writer

Louise Frances Field (née Story, 1856–1940) was an Irish novelist and literary critic who wrote an early historical study of children's literature in England.

== Life and work ==
Born Louise Frances Story in 1856 to a Justice of the Peace in Bingfield, Crossdoney, County Cavan, Field wrote under the name Mrs Field or Mrs E. M. Field, and is occasionally listed as Louisa. She wrote stories for and about children and was known for her writings on the Sepoy Indian Rebellion of 1857 and the Irish Famine.

== Works ==
- A Brave Girl: The Beginning of Trouble
- Bryda: A Story of the Indian Mutiny
- The Way Thither, 1882
- Denis, 1896
- Bryda, 1889
- Ethne, 1889
- The Child And His Book, 1891/95
- Little Count Paul, 1894
- Master Magnus; Or The Prince, The Princess And The Dragon, 1895
- The Child And His Book, 1896
- Bid Me To Live, 1898
- Our Village Candidates Class, 1898
- At The King's Right Hand, 1904
- Two Are Company, 1905
- Castle Dangerous Of Canada, 1913
- Addresses To Mothers, 1926
- Mixed Pickles, 1886
