= Mary McDonagh =

Irish poet

Mary McDonagh (born 23 November 1849) was an Irish poet.

The daughter of a Mr. McDonagh and a Ms. McGreal, Mary was educated at Kildare Place Training College, Dublin, and frequently contributed to the Church of Ireland Parochial Mazine. She married a Mr. Pearle, and with their infant daughter, emigrated to the United States in 1881, after which date all her work was published in that country.
