= Margracia Loudon =

Irish novelist (c.1788–1860)

- Born: Margracia Ryves c. 1788; Castle Ryves, Knocklong, County Limerick, Ireland
- Died: 1860 (aged 71–72); Cheltenham, Gloucestershire, England
- Occupation: Novelist
- Notable work: Philanthropic Economy (1835); The Light of Mental Science (1845); The Voices of Bulgaria (1846)

Margracia Loudon (née Ryves}; c. 1788–1860) was an Irish novelist and political writer. She is known for her political works Philanthropic Economy (1835), The Light of Mental Science (1845), The Voices of Bulgaria (1846).

== Biography ==
Margracia Ryves was born around 1788 at Castle Ryves, near Knocklong, County Limerick, Ireland. She was the daughter of William Ryves, a landowner, and his wife, Frances Catherine Ryves, author of Cumbrian Legends; or, Tales of Other Times (1812). In 1830, she married Charles Loudon, a physician, and they settled in Leamington Spa, Warwickshire, England.

Loudon was a popular novelist before turning to political writing. Her Philanthropic Economy (1835) became famous for its opposition to the Corn Laws, and actually predated the founding of the Anti-Corn Law League (1838). Her next work, The Light of Mental Science (1845), was influenced by phrenology. Her final non-fiction work, The Voices of Bulgaria (1846), focused on the plight of Christians in Ottoman-occupied Bulgaria and featured her own translations from Bulgarian.

She died in Cheltenham, Gloucestershire, England in 1860.

== Bibliography ==
=== Novels ===
- First Love: A Novel (1830)
- Fortune-Hunting: A Novel (1832)
- Dilemmas of Pride (1833)
- The Fortunes of Woman (1849)
- Maternal Love: A Novel. 3 vol. London: T. C. Newby, 1849.

=== Other works ===
- Philanthropic Economy, or the Philosophy of Happiness, Practically Applied to the Social, Political, and Commercial Relations of Great Britain (1835)
- Corn Laws: Selections from Mrs Loudon's Philanthropic Economy (1842)
- The Light of Mental Science (1845)
- The Voices of Bulgaria (1846)
