= Nuala Ní Chonchúir =

Irish writer and poet (born 1970)

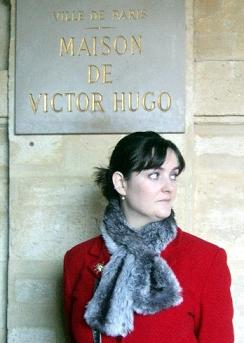
- Nuala Ní Chonchúir
- Born: 14 January 1970 (age 56); Dublin, Ireland
- Occupations: Novelist, short story writer, poet
- Writing career
- Pen name: Nuala O'Connor
- Genre: Literary fiction
- Website: www.nualaoconnor.com

Nuala Ní Chonchúir (born 14 January 1970) is an Irish fiction writer and poet.

== Personal life ==
Born in Dublin in 1970, Ní Chonchúir currently resides in County Galway. She holds a BA in Irish from Trinity College Dublin and a Masters in Translation Studies (Irish/English) from Dublin City University. She has worked as a theatre and writers' centre arts administrator, translator, bookseller and also in a university library. Ní Chonchúirteaches creative writing on a part-time basis.

In 2009, Ní Chonchúir was featured in The Irish Times' "People to Watch in the Year Ahead".

== Career ==
Ní Chonchúir has published five novels, four collections of short fiction and three poetry collections - one in an anthology. Her short story "The Wind Across the Grass" won the RTÉ Francis MacManus Award in 2002. She collaborated with writers Deirdre Brennan and Máighréad Medbh on the volume of poetry, Divas! (2003).

Her third short story collection, Nude, was published in 2009 by Salt Publishing. She was also writer in residence that year for the Cúirt International Festival of Literature. In November, her poetry pamphlet Portrait of the Artist With a Red Car was published by Templar Poetry.

In 2010, her first novel You was published by New island books. Her poetry collection The Juno Charm was published by Salmon Poetry the following November.

Her fourth short story collection, Mother America, was published in June 2012 by New Island Books. The story "Peach", from the collection, was published in Prairie Schooner's Winter 2011 issue and was nominated for the 2012 Pushcart Prize. She also wrote an essay for the Wales Arts Review's Bloomsday edition.

In September 2013, Tower Press (USA) published Of Dublin and Other Fictions, a chapbook collection of Ní Chonchúir's flash fiction. Her second novel, Closet of Savage Mementos was shortlisted for The Kerry Group Irish Novel of the Year Award 2015.

In October 2014, she was nominated for the Laureate for Irish Fiction.

Nuala's third novel, Miss Emily, was published by Penguin USA and Penguin Canada in July 2015, and by Sandstone Press in August of the same year. It was shortlisted for the Eason Book Club novel of the Year 2015 and was nominated for the 2017 Dublin International Literary Award.

Seaborne was longlisted for the International Dublin Literary Award in 2025.

== Reception ==
Selected reviews include:

"… one of Ireland's most unusual and creative minds; [her fiction is] dressed in modernity, a ritual playing of the bones of Irish storytelling." - Irish Examiner, 2009

"...The novel flows beautifully and is understated in tone... This gem is sure to win her further acclaim. Nuala Ní Chonchúir is a writer to watch." - Sue Leonard, Irish Examiner, 2010

== Bibliography ==
=== Novel ===
Year	Title	As	Publisher	ISBN
2010	You	Nuala Ní Chonchúir	New Island	978-1-84840-063-4
2014	The Closet of Savage Mementos	Nuala Ní Chonchúir	New Island	978-1-84840-336-9
2015	Miss Emily	Nuala O'Connor	Penguin, Sandstone	978-0-14312-675-1
2018	Becoming Belle	Nuala O'Connor	Penguin, Putnam, Piatkus	978-0-73521-440-8
2021	NORA	Nuala O'Connor	Harper Perennial, New Island	978-1-84840-789-3
2024	Seaborne	Nuala O'Connor	New Island	978-1-84840-892-0

=== Short story collections ===
Year	Title	As	Publisher	ISBN	Notes
2004	The Wind Across the Grass	Nuala Ní Chonchúir	Arlen House	1-903631-46-7	
2005	To The World of Men, Welcome	Nuala Ní Chonchúir	Arlen House	1-903631-51-3	
2009	nude	Nuala Ní Chonchúir	Salt	978-1-84471-642-5	
2012	Mother America	Nuala Ní Chonchúir	New Island	978-1-84840-159-4	
2013	Of Dublin and Other Fictions	Nuala Ní Chonchúir	Tower Press	978-0-9898572-0-8	Flash Fiction, Chapbook
2017	Joyride to Jupiter	Nuala Ní Chonchúir	New Island	978-1-84840-615-5	
2020	Birdie	Nuala O'Connor	Arlen House	978-1-85132-262-6	Flash Fiction
2022	A Little Unsteadily Into Light	Nuala O'Connor	New Island Books	978-1-84840-861-6	

=== Poetry collections ===
Year	Title	As	Publisher	ISBN	Notes
2003	Molly's Daughter	Nuala Ní Chonchúir	Arlen House	1-903631-40-8	From Divas: New Irish women's writing
2007	Tattoo:Tatú	Nuala Ní Chonchúir	Arlen House	978-1-903631-60-7	
2009	Portrait of the Artist With a Red Car	Nuala Ní Chonchúir	Templar Poetry	978-1-906285-10-4	
2011	The Juno Charm	Nuala Ní Chonchúir	Salmon Poetry	978-1-907056-64-2	
