= Mary Birkett Card =

Abolitionist and feminist

- Born: Mary Birkett; 28 December 1774; Liverpool, United Kingdom
- Died: 1817 (aged 42–43); Dublin
- Notable work: A Poem on the African Slave Trade

Mary Birkett Card (28 December 1774–1817), was an Irish based British poet, abolitionist, and feminist, best remembered for her anti-slavery poem, A Poem on the African Slave Trade published when she was seventeen.

== Biography ==
Mary Birkett was born on 28 December 1774 in Liverpool to William and Sarah Birkett. Her father was a chandler and in 1784 the family moved to Dublin. They were a Quaker family. Her uncle was the abolitionist George Harrison, one of the founders of the Society for Effecting the Abolition of the Slave Trade. The Birkett family were middle class and while less strict and plain, as Quakers they stood apart from their Irish neighbours, remaining more connected to their links in Britain and their English identity. Card was educated in music, art, French, drawing and literature. She married Nathaniel Card in 1801. He was a second cousin and a merchant in Dublin. The couple had eight children but only four survived infancy. The family business had financial difficulties which she discusses in her writings. She wrote a significant number of poems while staying with an American Quaker family in Milford Haven in 1804. The Rotch family lived in Castle Hall and entertained people from many spheres including writers, artists and naval officers.

Although there is a significant portion of her writing which is anti-slavery, it is only a small part of her work. She wrote extensively about the various issues faced by a Quaker woman in Dublin. While the Quaker organisation allowed women a certain level of equality around preaching, the major decisions were still taken by the Men's meetings. Card was constrained in what she was supposed to write about. Her poems begin with her fears about moving to Ireland and continue through life as a young Quaker women and working out how to become the ideal in both her life and art. Over time her work turns toward prose more than poetry. In her search to become the idea Quaker woman her work identifies increasingly the need to conform and submit, limiting her self expression. Some of this limiting of self comes as a result of the loss of her children where she believes her inattention to the right path has caused their deaths.

Although she tried to remain as obedient and spiritual as possible Card did not completely remain within the home. She was involved in running the family business as well as being involved in the Women's meetings. Card raised funds for a variety of charitable ends and held responsible positions on committees for relief and education. These roles often involved travel and staying away from home. Card continued her work as an abolitionist throughout, pushing for votes against the slave trade.

Her anti-slavery poem encouraged women to get involved and boycott products made available through he trade. As a result thousands gave up sugar in their tea in protest. Card suffered ill health and died after an illness in 1817. She had a son Nathaniel Card who collected her writings in 1834. This included her journal, letters and over 220 poems.
