= Cláir Ní Aonghusa =

Irish novelist and poet (born 1953)

Cláír Ní Aonghusa
- Born: 1953 (age 72–73); Dublin, Ireland
- Occupations: Novelist, Poet

Cláír Ní Aonghusa (born 1953) is an Irish novelist and poet.

She was born in Dublin where she lives. She has published two novels, Four Houses and A Marriage (Poolbeg 1997) and Civil and Strange (Houghton & Mifflin 2008).
