= Melanie Le Brocquy =

Irish sculptor (1919–2018)

Melanie le Brocquy (23 December 1919 – 22 June 2018) was an Irish sculptor who specialized in female figures and family members. Forms are reduced to a simple statement. Although she did not create very many works, her skills are widely respected. Among her most successful pieces are busts of her brother Louis (1916–2012), a painter, and of her mother.

== Biography ==
Born in Dublin in 1919, Melanie le Brocquy attended the National College of Art & Design before continuing her studies at Geneva's École des Beaux-Arts. She then returned to Ireland in order to study at Dublin's Royal Hibernian Academy. It was here in 1995 that she received a prize for the best bronze casting.

Among her most notable works are a bronze of St Patrick (1941) which in 2001 was installed in St Patrick's Cathedral. Her four busts of Oscar Wilde can be seen in Trinity College Dublin, the American College Dublin, Magdalen College, Oxford, and the Irish Embassy in Washington.

Le Brocquy exhibited at the Salzburg Biennale in 1962 and held solo exhibitions in Dublin, London and Belfast. Among her awards are the California Gold Medal (1939) and the Claremorris Open Exhibition prize (1991).
