= Gemma O'Connor (writer) =

Irish mystery writer

Gemma O'Connor (born 1940 in Dublin) is an Irish mystery writer.

== Life ==
Born in Dublin in 1940, and educated in Ireland and France, she lived in Oxford, where she worked as a bookbinder, restaurateur and stewardess before becoming a writer.

In 1995 O'Connor had her first mystery story published, and as of 2019, she has had at least four more books published.

O'Connor and eighteen other female Irish writers contributed short stories for the 2005 collection, Irish Girls Are Back in Town.

== Bibliography ==
Grace Hartfield

- Sins of omission
- Falls the shadow
- Farewell to the Flesh (1998)

Juliet Furbo

- Time to remember

Passage South

- Walking on water
- Following the Wake (2002)
