= Mary O'Brien (writer) =

Irish poet and playwright

- Other names: Mrs. Patrick O'Brien

Mary O'Brien (fl. 1785 – 1790), was an Irish poet and playwright who wrote during and about the Regency era.

== Biography ==
Very little is known about the personal life of Mary O'Brien except that she was the wife of Patrick O'Brien Esq. as she wrote both under her name and as Mrs Patrick O'Brien. She was in favour of Irish economic independence and an independent Irish parliament as well as being a supporter of Charles James Fox and Richard Brinsley Sheridan. She believed that King George III should be replaced by a Regent while he was unwell. O'Brien hoped that this would also remove William Pitt from his position. Her work was considered satyrical and political. She wrote poetry and plays.

== Bibliography ==
- The political monitor; or Regent's friend, (1790)
- The Fallen Patriot, (1794)
- Charles Henley
- The pious incendiaries, (1785)
