= Harriet Letitia Martin =

Irish novelist (1801–1891)

Harriet Letitia Martin (5 July 1801 – 12 January 1891) was a 19th-century Irish novelist.

== Biography ==
Harriet Letitia Martin was born in London in 1801. She was the daughter of the novelist and stage-critic Harriet Evans Martin, and Richard Martin MP, a prominent member of the Martyn family of Galway. Other literary members of her family included her niece, Mary Letitia Martin (1815–1850) and her cousin Violet Florence Martin (1862–1915).

She spent the first years of her life in London, where her father sat as member for parliament for Galway. She was raised at the family home in Ballynahinch, County Galway; her father's townhouse in Galway town; and in Dublin. Following her father's dismissal from the House of Commons for illegal election in 1826, Martin, her mother and surviving sister accompanied him into exile in France, which lasted till his death in January 1834.

Martin is said to have travelled widely in Europe and in North America. She made the acquaintance of John Banim in Paris, and while staying with him, wrote her best-known work, Canvassing.

In later life, she settled in Dublin, where she lived with her sister. She died in Dublin, unmarried, in 1891.

== Bibliography ==
- Canvassing, Saunders & Otley, London, 1835
- The Changeling, a tale of the year '47, Saunders & Otley, London, 1848

== See also ==
- The Tribes of Galway
