= Harriet Evans Martin =

Anglo-Irish novelist

Harriet Evans Martin (died 1846) was an Anglo-Irish novelist.

Born Harriet Evans, she was the daughter of Hugh Evans, senior surgeon of the 5th Dragoon Guards. George Evans, 4th Baron Carbery may have been a paternal relative, as she dedicated one of her books to him.

Her first marriage, c. 1788, was to Captain Robert Hesketh, R.N.; they had no chldren. In May 1794 she remarried to Richard Martin MP (1754–1834). They had three daughters and a son. One of her children, Harriet Letitia Martin, would herself become a noted writer.

Martin established her reputation with the publication of her Remarks in 1802, a well-regarded critical study on the performances of stage actor John Philip Kemble (1757–1823).

== Bibliography ==
- Historic tales. A novel, Dublin, 1788
- Remarks on ... J. Kemble's performance of Hamlet and Richard III, London, 1802
- Helen of Glenross. A novel, London, 1802

== Sources ==
- The King of Connemara, Shevaun Lynham, Lilliput Press, Dublin, 1975
- A Guide to Irish Fiction 1650–1900, Lober, Lober and Burnham, Four Courts Press, Dublin, 2008
