= Catharine Selden =

Catharine Selden (dates not known) was an Irish writer of Gothic novels in the early 19th century.

Little known today, she was "prolific" and her novels "best-selling" for her publisher, Minerva Press. She published seven novels. The first, The English Nun (1797), was written in imitation of Diderot's La Religieuse (1792).

== Bibliography ==
- The English Nun: a Novel (London, 1797)
- The Count de Santerre (1797)
- Lindor; or Early Engagements (1798)
- Serena (1800)
- The Sailors (1800)
- German Letters (Translator, Cork, 1804)
- Villa Nova: or, The Ruined Castle (1805)
- Villasantelle, or The Curious Impertinent (1817)
