= Marianne Kenley =

Irish writer

Marianne Kenley-Munster (c. 1770/1780 – c. 1818) was an Irish Gothic writer, best known for her romance novel The Cottage of the Appenines, Or the Castle of Novina. A Romance (1806). She is thought to have been born in Ulster and to have died in Belfast.
