= List of Irish short story writers =

This is a list of short story Irish writers either born in Ireland or holding Irish citizenship. Short story writers whose work is in Irish are included. A brief outline of the history of Irish fiction is also available.

== A–D ==
- Samuel Beckett (1906–1989)
- Maeve Binchy (1940–2012)
- Elizabeth Bowen (1899–1973)
- Clare Boylan (1948–2006)
- Patrick Boyle (1905–1982)
- Maeve Brennan (1917–1993)
- Donn Byrne (1889–1928)
- William Carleton (1794–1849)
- Joyce Cary (1888–1957)
- Patrick Chapman (born 1968)
- Padraic Colum (1881–1972)
- Daniel Corkery (1878–1964)
- Julia Crottie (1853–?)
- Ita Daly (born 1945)
- Lord Dunsany (1878–1957)
- Martina Devlin

== E–L ==
- Maria Edgeworth (1767–1849)
- M. E. Francis (1859–1930)
- Brian Friel (1929–2015)
- Miriam Gallagher (born 1940)
- Gerald Griffin (1803–1840)
- Jack Harte
- Aidan Higgins (1927–2015)
- Desmond Hogan (born 1951)
- Fred Johnston (writer) (1951–2024)
- Neil Jordan (born 1950)
- James Joyce (1882–1941)
- Claire Keegan (born 1969)
- Maeve Kelly (1930–2025)
- Benedict Kiely (1919–2007)
- Mary Lavin (1912–1996)
- Sheridan Le Fanu (1814–1873)
- Edmund Leamy (1848–1904)

== M–O ==
- Walter Macken (1915–1967)
- John MacKenna (born 1952)
- Bernard MacLaverty (born 1942)
- Michael McLaverty (1907–1992)
- Bryan MacMahon (1909–1998)
- Violet Florence Martin (1862–1923) of Somerville and Ross partnership
- Aidan Mathews (born 1956)
- Eugene McCabe (1930–2020)
- John McGahern (1934–2006)
- Janet McNeill (1907–1994)
- George McWhirter (born 1939)
- John Montague (1929–2016)
- George Moore (1852–1933)
- Val Mulkerns (1925–2018)
- C. E. Murphy (born 1973)
- Nuala Ní Chonchúir (born 1970)
- Éilís Ní Dhuibhne (born 1954)
- Edna O'Brien (1930–2024)
- Kate Cruise O'Brien (1948–1998)
- Máirtín Ó Cadhain (1906–1970)
- Billy O'Callaghan (born 1974)
- Philip Ó Ceallaigh (born 1968)
- Pádraic Ó Conaire (1882–1928)
- Frank O'Connor (1903–1966)
- Mary O'Donnell (born 1954)
- Julia O'Faolain (1933–2020)
- Seán Ó Faoláin (1900–1990)
- Liam O'Flaherty (1896–1984)
- Seumas O'Kelly (1881–1918)

== P–Z ==
- James Plunkett (1920–2003)
- Lennox Robinson (1886–1958)
- Somerville and Ross (1858–1949 and 1862–1915)
- James Stephens (1882–1950)
- Eithne Strong(1925–1999)
- Colm Tóibín (born 1955)
- William Trevor (1928–2016)
- William Wall (born 1955)
- Liz Weir (born 1950)
- Oscar Wilde (1854–1900)

== See also ==
- Irish literature
- Irish short story
- List of Irish poets
- List of Irish novelists
- List of Irish dramatists
