= Irish prose fiction =

Genre of Irish literature

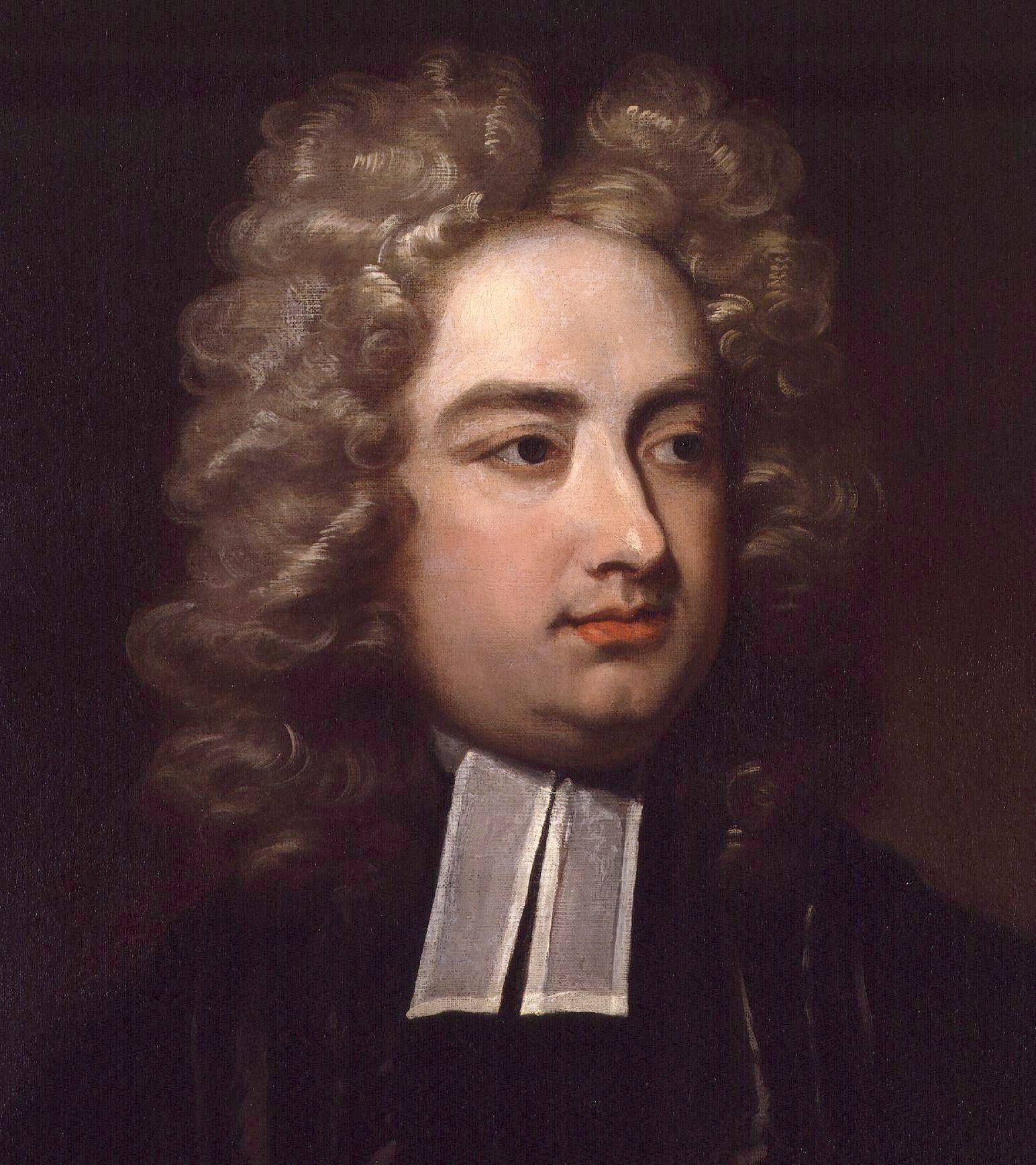
Jonathan Swift, the first Irish novelist of note.

The first Irish prose fiction, in the form of legendary stories, appeared in the Irish language as early as the seventh century, along with chronicles and lives of saints in Irish and Latin. Such fiction was an adaptation and elaboration of earlier oral material and was the work of a learned class who had acquired literacy with the coming of Latin Christianity. A number of these stories were still available in manuscripts of the Late Middle Ages and even as late as the nineteenth century, though poetry was by that time the main literary vehicle of the Irish language.

The first notable English-language prose fiction in Ireland was the work of Jonathan Swift, who published Gulliver's Travels in 1726. Little of note appeared in English by any resident Irish writer until the nineteenth century, when a number of novelists came to prominence.

Modern prose fiction in Irish owes much to the Gaelic revival at the end of the nineteenth century, when cultural nationalists made a determined effort to create the conditions for a modern literature. A substantial body of short stories and novels appeared in Irish as a result.

Irish prose fiction in English attracted worldwide attention in the course of the twentieth century. Its greatest exponent was James Joyce, a highly influential modernist whose only rival in Irish was Máirtín Ó Cadhain.

Prose fiction in both languages has continued to flourish, with English being the primary vehicle. The short story has received particular attention, with a number of distinguished practitioners.

== Early and medieval period ==
The earliest Irish prose fiction is a branch of heroic literature: stories dealing with supernatural personages and human heroes. One of the most famous is Táin Bó Cuailnge, together with its associated stories. It is thought to have been originally a seventh-century text and deals with the conflict between Connacht and Ulster in the pre-Christian period. Another well-known tale is Scéla Mucc Meic Dathó, written c. 800 and dealing with the rivalries of a warrior aristocracy. Fled Bricrend is an inventive satire, recounting the conflict that follows the machinations of the malicious Bricriu. A number of famous tales are associated with narrative groupings known as the Ulster Cycle and the Cycle of the Kings. It has been noted that it is not heroic deeds per se that supply the interest of the stories, but the dramatic consequences that flow from those exploits. The stories are notable for the importance of the female protagonists.

The coming of the Anglo-Normans in the twelfth century brought with it new literary influences. By the fourteenth century translations were being made into Irish from other languages. Among these were Merugad Uilis mac Leirtis, a prose adaptation from the Odyssey via Latin, and Stair Ercuil agus a bhás, a fifteenth-century composition translated from the English version of a French work. Arthurian tales or works showing Arthurian influence were popular in Irish, and two English tales, Bevis of Hampton and Sir Guy of Warwick, were also translated.

== 1600 to 1800 ==
The outstanding fictional prose work of seventeenth-century Ireland is Pairlement Chloinne Tomáis, a Rabelaisian satire written by members of the Gaelic elite on what they saw as the upstart lower classes, who were taking advantage of the disruption to the social order caused by the weakening of the old Irish nobility. This work was popular and influential, with its hero, Tomás Mac Lóbais, becoming a proverbial figure. Its themes were reflected in a number of other satires or burlesque tales of the period.

The late seventeenth century saw the birth in Dublin of Jonathan Swift (1667 – 1745), a satirist and clergyman who in 1726 published the first great work by an Anglo-Irish writer, Gulliver's Travels. Though this had no specifically Irish relevance, it set a standard for later writers in English.

The eighteenth century saw the birth in Ireland of two distinguished novelists, Laurence Sterne (1713 – 1768) and Oliver Goldsmith (1728 – 1774), both of whom, however, made their careers in England. Despite this, their oeuvre is often included in the Anglo-Irish literary canon. Sterne published The Life and Opinions of Tristram Shandy, Gentleman (1759–1767), a satire on the biographical novel. Goldsmith, best known as a poet, published The Vicar of Wakefield (1766), written in a direct and conversational style uncommon at the time.

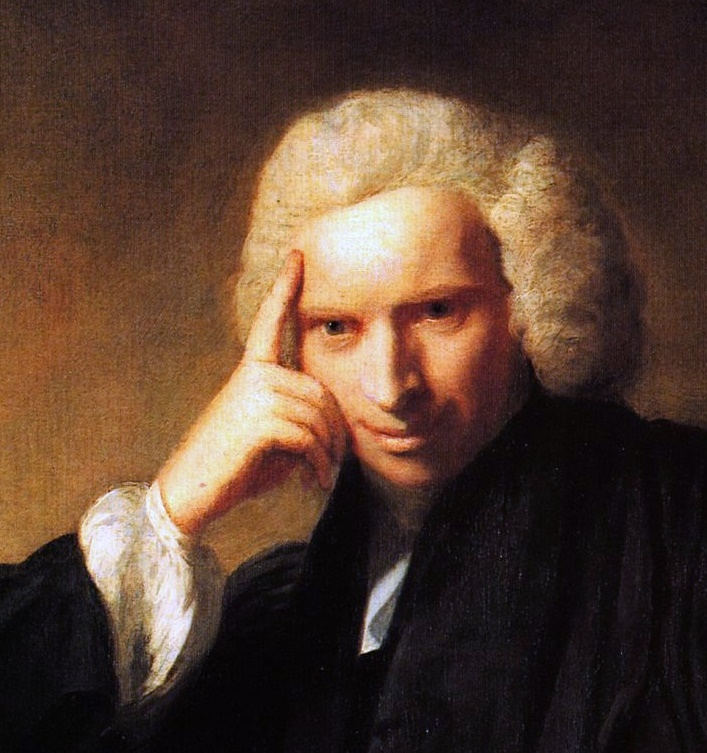
Laurence Sterne as painted by Joshua Reynolds

Irish was still Ireland's most important literary language in the eighteenth century, but little prose was produced. The emphasis, instead, was on poetry, with such prominent literary figures as the Munster writer Aogán Ó Rathaille.

== 19th century ==
The 19th century saw a burgeoning of Anglo-Irish prose fiction, but literary output in Irish diminished dramatically.

Maria Edgeworth (1767–1849), though of English birth, spent most of her life in Ireland and wrote what is generally considered the first novel on an Irish theme, Castle Rackrent (1800), describing landlord-tenant relations on an Irish estate. A number of other novels followed. Lady Morgan (Sidney Owenson) (1776(?)-1859) was also a prolific writer. Her most successful work was her third novel, The Wild Irish Girl (1806), a work marked by Jacobin feminist politics.

Charles Robert Maturin (1782–1824) was best known for Melmoth the Wanderer (1820), a Faustian tale of a man who sells his soul to the devil.

William Carleton (1794–1869) and John Banim (1798–1842) wrote novels that depicted with some realism the lives of Irish peasantry. The latter often wrote in collaboration with his brother Michael Banim (1796–1874). All these writers came from the world they depicted. Gerald Griffin (1803–1840) was born in Limerick but spent time in England. On returning to Ireland he wrote The Collegians, on which his reputation rests.

Joseph Sheridan Le Fanu (1814–1873) was born in Dublin and lived there for most of his life. He was noted for his mystery novels and Gothic fiction (some of which is based on Irish folklore). Bram Stoker (1847–1912), a writer of similar interests, was born in Dublin but spent much his life in England. He wrote many books but is best known for Dracula, one of the most famous novels in the Gothic tradition.

Charles Kickham (1828–1882) was born in County Tipperary. He served a term in prison for treasonous activities and began writing novels there. His Knocknagow; or The Homes of Tipperary (1879) was the most popular Irish novel of the 19th century.

Edith Anna Somerville (1858–1949) and her cousin, Violet Florence Martin (1862–1915) wrote in collaboration and popularised the "big house" novel, based on the life of the Irish gentry class to which they themselves belonged. Their books include The Irish R.M. and The Real Charlotte.

George Moore (1852–1933) spent much of his early career in Paris and was one of the first writers to use the techniques of the French realist novelists in English. His novels were often controversial for their frankness. His short stories helped popularise the form among Irish authors.

The persistence of traditional genres in Irish can be seen in the papers of Amhlaoibh Ó Súilleabháin, a Kilkenny schoolteacher, merchant and diarist of the early nineteenth century. Like many other local Irish scholars at the time, he assembled a comprehensive manuscript collection of earlier Irish prose, and also wrote prose sketches himself, though these remained unpublished.

== 1900 on ==
=== Fiction in English ===
James Joyce (1882–1941) is often regarded as the father of the literary technique known as "stream of consciousness", best exemplified in his famous work Ulysses. Joyce also wrote Finnegans Wake, Dubliners, and the semi-autobiographical A Portrait of the Artist as a Young Man. Ulysses, often considered to be the greatest novel of the 20th century, is the story of a day in the life of a city, Dublin. Finnegans Wake is written in an invented language which parodies English, Irish and Latin.

Samuel Beckett (1906–1989), who won the Nobel Prize for Literature in 1969, was born in Dublin but later moved to France. He wrote thereafter in French and English. Best known for his plays, he also wrote works of fiction, including his trilogy Molloy, Malone Dies and The Unnamable (originally written in French).

Aidan Higgins (1927 – 2015) wrote an experimental version of the big house novel called Langrishe, Go Down. He also published short stories and several volumes of memoirs, often in an experimental vein. More conventional exponents of the big house novel include Elizabeth Bowen (1899–1973), whose novels and short stories include Encounters (1923), The Last September (1929), and The Death of the Heart (1938) and Molly Keane (1904–1996) (writing as M.J. Farrell), author of Young Entry (1928), Conversation Piece (1932), Devoted Ladies (1934), Full House (1935), The Loving Without Tears (1951) and other works.

Francis Stuart (1902–2000) published his first novel, Women and God in 1931. He was a prolific novelist. He went to work in Germany in the 1930s and his reputation was affected by his decision to remain there during World War II, broadcasting anti-British talks on German radio. His novel Black List, Section H (1971), is a fictionalised account of those years.

With the rise of the Irish Free State and the Republic of Ireland, some authors began to write of the lives of the lower-middle classes and small farmers. Exponents of this genre include Brinsley MacNamara (1890–1963) (real name John Weldon), whose 1918 The Valley of the Squinting Windows was the first novel in this genre, and John McGahern (1934 – 2006), whose first novel, The Dark (1965), depicted child abuse in a rural community. The Catholic conscience in the modern world was examined by Brian Moore (1921–1999), who was born in Belfast but became a citizen of Canada in 1953.

J. G. Farrell (1935–79) was born in Liverpool of Anglo-Irish parents, but lived intermittently in Ireland after World War II. His works include a novel called Troubles, set during the Irish War of Independence (1919 – 1921), and this has led some to regard him as an Irish novelist. He acquired a high critical reputation.

Brian O'Nolan (known by the pen name Flann O'Brien) is best known for two works in English, the surrealistic and satirical At Swim-Two-Birds (1939), highly praised by Joyce, and The Third Policeman, published in 1967, after his death. But he was also the author of An Béal Bocht (1941), a satire in Irish on Gaeltacht autobiographies, later translated as The Poor Mouth.

The short story has also proven popular with Irish fiction writers. Well-known writers in the genre include Frank O'Connor (1903–1966) and Seán Ó Faoláin (1900–1991).

Notable names straddling the late 20th and early 21st century include John Banville, Sebastian Barry, Gerard Beirne, Dermot Bolger, Seamus Deane, Dermot Healy, Jennifer Johnston, Eugene McCabe, Patrick McCabe, John McGahern, Edna O'Brien, Colm Tóibín, William Trevor and William Wall. Writers to have emerged in the 21st-century include Sally Rooney, Claire Keegan, Philip Ó Ceallaigh, Cónal Creedon, Jamie O'Neill and Keith Ridgway.

Recent fiction by Irish writers has attracted attention in the neighbouring United Kingdom. Some writers have won the Booker Prize, with others being shortlisted. Among Ireland's Booker winners are Paddy Clarke Ha Ha Ha by Roddy Doyle and The Gathering by Anne Enright. John Banville's The Sea won in 2005, though it proved a controversial choice. Banville has also won other international awards, including the Franz Kafka Prize and the Austrian State Prize for European Literature, and has been mentioned as the next Irish contender for the Nobel Prize in Literature.

There has been a rise in the amount of popular fiction being published in a range of genres, including romantic novels and detective stories set in New York. The 21st-century has also brought an increased emphasis on writing by women, which found concrete expression in the founding of the publishers Arlen House. Irish writers of a commercial bent include Cecelia Ahern (PS, I Love You), Maeve Binchy (Tara Road), John Boyne (The Boy in the Striped Pyjamas), Marian Keyes (Lucy Sullivan Is Getting Married) and Joseph O'Connor (Cowboys and Indians, Desperadoes).

=== Fiction in Irish ===
Fiction in Irish was greatly stimulated by the Gaelic revival, which insisted on the need for a modern literature. The first novel in Irish (an historical romance) was written by Patrick S. Dinneen, lexicographer and literary scholar. He was followed by Father Peadar Ua Laoghaire, who in the 1890s published, in a serialised form, a folkloristic novel strongly influenced by the storytelling tradition of the Gaeltacht, called Séadna. His other works include retellings of classical Irish stories.

Among the many writers who published prose fiction in Irish in the first decades of the twentieth century, two stood out: Patrick Pearse and Pádraig Ó Conaire. Pearse wrote elegant, idealised stories about the Irish-speaking countryside. Ó Conaire was a realist, dealing with urban as well as rural life, but also wrote an absurdist novel called Deoraíocht, unlike anything else published at the time. They were followed by two brothers, Séamus Ó Grianna and Seosamh Mac Grianna, who wrote in quite different ways about the Gaeltacht community in which they had grown up. Seosamh in particular was concerned with the psychological and emotional struggle involved in the transition to modernity.

The most prominent literary modernist was Máirtín Ó Cadhain, a native speaker who looked at his own community with a critical eye. His masterpiece was the novel Cré na Cille, filled with the voices of the quarrelling dead. He published several collections of short stories, adapting his writing style over time to an urban milieu. The best known modernists to follow him were not of Gaeltacht background: Eoghan Ó Tuairisc, Diarmaid Ó Súilleabháin, and Breandán Ó Doibhlin (the last influenced by French literary theory). Ó Tuairisc was a stylistic innovator; Ó Súilleabháin was immersed in the middle-class urban world; Ó Doibhlin was more introspective in his approach.

The Gaeltacht, though in linguistic decline, has continued to produce novelists and short story writers such as Pádraig Breathnach, Micheál Ó Conghaile, Pádraig Ó Cíobháin and Joe Steve Ó Neachtain.

There have also been contributions to more popular genres. They include the work of Cathal Ó Sándair (1922–1996), a prolific author whose oeuvre included westerns. Éilís Ní Dhuibhne has written popular murder mysteries.

The short story remains a popular genre in Irish as in English. Donncha Ó Céileachair and Síle Ní Chéileachair, brother and sister, published the influential collection Bullaí Mhártain in 1955. In 1953 Liam O'Flaherty published the collection Dúil, his only work in Irish. One of the best known of contemporary practitioners is Seán Mac Mathúna (who also writes in English). His work is characterised by humour and a poetic realism and has been praised for its originality. The work of Daithí Ó Muirí is distinguished by its black humour and absurdist quality, a contrast to the social realism of much modern writing in Irish. A recent development has been an increase in the number of women writers, including Orna Ní Choileáin, Méadhbh Ní Ghallchobhair, Deirdre Ní Ghrianna and others.

== See also ==
- Irish literature
- Irish poetry
- Irish short story
- Irish theatre
- List of Irish novelists
- List of Irish poets
- List of Irish short story writers
- List of people on the postage stamps of Ireland
