= Irish short stories =

Short stories have a distinctive place in the modern Irish literary tradition. Many of Ireland's best writers, both in English and Irish, have been practitioners of the form.

== Origins ==
It is possible that the Irish short story evolved naturally from the ancient tradition of oral storytelling in Ireland. The written word has been cultivated in Ireland since the introduction of the Roman alphabet by the Christian missionaries in the fifth century. But oral storytelling continued independently up to the twentieth century and survived the general switch from the Irish to the English language. By the mid-nineteenth century Irish writers had begun to use the English language to record the lives, and to convey the thoughts of the ordinary people – mostly impoverished peasants – and to address themselves to an Irish readership. The most popular literary form to emerge from this development was the tale, and the most notable practitioner was William Carleton (1794–1869), author of Traits and Stories of the Irish Peasantry (1830).

== The modern Irish short story ==
=== Stories in English ===
An early example in Ireland is George Moore's collection of stories The Untilled Field (1903), which deal with themes of clerical interference in the daily lives of the Irish peasantry, and of the issue of emigration. The stories were originally written for translation into Irish, in order to serve as models for other writers working in the language. Three of the translations were published in the New Ireland Review, but publication was then paused due to a perceived anti-clerical sentiment. In 1902 the entire collection was translated by Tadhg Ó Donnchadha and Pádraig Ó Súilleabháin, and published in a parallel-text edition by the Gaelic League as An-tÚr-Ghort. Moore later revised the texts for the English edition. These stories were influenced by Turgenev's A Sportsman's Sketches, a book recommended to Moore by W. K. Magee, a sub-librarian of the National Library of Ireland, and had earlier suggested that Moore "was best suited to become Ireland's Turgenev". The tales are recognised by some as representing the birth of the Irish short story as a literary genre.

On 7 January 1904 Joyce attempted to publish an essay-story, "A Portrait of the Artist", dealing with aesthetics, only to have it rejected by the free-thinking magazine Dana. He decided, on his twenty-second birthday, to revise the story into a novel he called Stephen Hero, which was later re-written as A Portrait of the Artist as a Young Man. It was in 1905 that Joyce first attempted to get his famous collection of stories Dubliners published, and only after many attempts was it published in 1914.

One tradition of Irish storytelling is that it's passed down from ear to ear without being written down. Storytellers who recite these tales are known as Seanchaí. Examples of Seanchaí are Edmund Lenihan and Eamon Kelly (actor)

Liam O'Flaherty published his first collection, Spring Sowing, in 1924, depicting the harsh life of his native Aran Islands.

Daniel Corkery, A Munster Twilight (1916), was the first of a group of writers from County Cork. Seán Ó Faoláin, whose first collection Midsummer Night Madness, 1932, was another member of this group, as was Frank O'Connor. His first collection was Guests of the Nation, 1931. The work of this "Cork school" continued with Elizabeth Bowen (1899 – 1973), first collection Encounters, 1923, in the 1930s, '40s and '50s.

Important writers have continued writing stories, from the 1960s on, including Cónal Creedon, Benedict Kiely, Mary Lavin, John McGahern, and Michael McLaverty. An important editorial influence on the short story from the sixties onwards was David Marcus through his New Irish Writing column in the now defunct Irish Press newspaper and of numerous anthologies of Irish fiction and poetry, including the Phoenix Irish Short Stories collections.

Critical attention has been paid recently to the Irish short story with the publishing of three major books: A Companion to the British and Irish Short Story (2008), A History of the Irish Short Story (2011), and the collection of essays The Irish Short Story: Traditions and Trends (2015). In addition, the critical journal Journal of the Short Story in English has published special issues on Irish-American short stories, John McGahern, as well as the twenty-first-century Irish short story.

Elke D'hoker has commented on the quality of the Irish short story in the twenty-first century, with Éilís Ní Dhuibhne, Anne Enright, Bernard MacLaverty, John McGahern, Edna O'Brien, Colm Tóibín and William Trevor publishing collections – or collected stories – to great acclaim.

Several Irish short-story anthologies have been published since 2000 to meet the demands of the reading public, for example: the Faber Book of Best New Irish Short Stories 2005 and 2007; Irish Short Stories (2011), edited by Joseph O'Connor; Town and Country: New Irish Short Stories (2013), edited and with an introduction by Kevin Barry; The Granta Book of the Irish Short Story was published in 2010, edited and with an introduction by Anne Enright.; Silver Threads of Hope, edited by Anne Enright and Sinéad Gleeson in 2012; and The Long Gaze Back: An Anthology of Irish Women Writers (2015), edited by Sinéad Gleeson. In addition, The Stinging Fly Magazine has been fostering new short story writing, along with other publishing houses such as New Island Books.

=== Stories in Irish ===
The Gaelic Revival at the beginning of the 20th century saw the Irish language re-emerging as a literary medium after a century of almost complete neglect. This had an effect on all genres, short stories among them. The tradition that developed was characterised by great variety, reflecting the background of the writers. It is likely that over a thousand stories have been written in Irish.

A modernist pioneer was Patrick Pearse, language activist and revolutionary, and writer of stories of idealistic content in a contemporary European form. Pearse was executed in 1916 but left a legacy which opened new possibilities for the language. Modernist possibilities were further developed by Pádraic Ó Conaire, a writer of the 1920s on whom the European influence was evident but whose own legacy was mixed. He wrote, like Pearse, in the Irish of Conamara, sometimes setting his stories in that remote landscape and at other times in the towns. Ó Conaire has been described as the true pioneer of short story writing in Irish because of his rejection of older conventions and his determination to deal fearlessly with the truths of human nature.

A different approach was taken by Pádraig Ó Siochfhradha (known as "An Seabhac" – the hawk), who set his comic stories and sketches in the Munster Gaeltacht. An Baile S'Againne (1913) ("Our Place").

The Donegal Gaeltacht brought forth Séamas Ó Grianna, who wrote prolifically and idiomatically about the people of his region, though much of his work has been criticised for its predictability. His brother Seosamh Mac Grianna, less prolific, left a handful of stories.

Máirtín Ó Cadhain, an idiosyncratic writer, was born in the Conamara Gaeltacht, a region rich in folklore but with no strong literary tradition. His early stories, written in a thorny and difficult style, though with psychological penetration, were set in his native region. He settled eventually in Dublin and his style became more direct, though still marked by imaginative intensity. He remains generally regarded as the doyen of the craft in Irish and one of the best writers to emerge from Ireland in the 20th century, despite the fact that the difficulty of his earlier style was criticised – a difficulty which may have robbed him of a wider readership.

The emigrant tradition in Ireland continued in the forties and fifties, and many of those who went were Irish speakers. One was Dónal Mac Amhlaidh, who took to writing about his experiences as a navvy in England and about other aspects of lives touched by exile.

Liam O'Flaherty, though a native speaker of Irish, made his name as a writer in English. He returned to Irish in a collection called Dúil ("Desire"), containing stories in the west of Ireland. The reviews were disappointing and may have discouraged him from writing in Irish again, but Dúil continues to be printed.

In the middle of the 20th century most habitual speakers of Irish still lived in the Gaeltacht, but the number of urban readers was growing. The genre was still dominated by a masculine sensibility, but in 1955 brother and sister Donncha Ó Céileachair and Síle Ní Chéileachair published Bullaí Mhártain, stories dealing with both the Munster Gaeltacht and city life. These stories were praised for their scope and their skilful adaptation of the language to an urban environment.

A collection of sketches and stories called Feamainn Bealtaine ("Seaweed in May") was published by the poet Máirtín Ó Direáin in 1961. These deal largely with his youth in the Irish-speaking Aran Islands.

An important contemporary practitioners of the genre, the poetic realist Seán Mac Mathúna (born 1935), has published versions of his stories in both Irish and English. His reputation was confirmed by his collection Ding ("Wedge"), with its disturbing title story. He was never a prolific writer, and has published little for some years.

The short story continues to be a favoured form for writers in Irish, possibly because it lends itself to publication in the two main literary magazines, Feasta and Comhar. Collections in Irish continue to be published, with over 125 presently available. Women writers are now more prominent – Orna Ní Choileáin, Méadhbh Ní Ghallchobhair, Deirdre Ní Ghrianna and others. Younger readers are addressed by writers like Ré Ó Laighléis, whose stories deal with social problems such as drug abuse. Most readers now come from the urban Irish-speaking community, together with all the younger writers. This represents a distinctive change in the situation of the language and the future of its literature, though the Gaeltacht still has writers from the older generation, such as Colm Ó Ceallaigh and Joe Steve Ó Neachtain.

The prevailing tone of short stories in Irish continues to be quotidian and realistic. An exception is the work of Daithí Ó Muirí, whose stories have been praised for their assured and engaging style and their surrealistic atmosphere. His collection Cogaí (Wars) won an important literary prize in 2001 in the Cló Iar-Chonnacht Literary Award Competition. The adjudicators referred to the savagery and vitality of the writing.

=== Critical theory ===
Influential books on the theory and practice of the short story were written by Sean O Faolain The Short Story (1948) and Frank O'Connor The Lonely Voice (1962). They advocated a realist approach in which the story focuses on a moment of crisis or change in a character's life.

This approach has been an important influence on the short story in Ireland. Recently Jack Hart declared in the preface to his collection From Under Gogol's Nose (2004) that the parameters of the short story had been set too narrowly. He advocates a broader range of possibilities, from stories that are almost essays to those that are almost poems. He argues that the short story should be seen as closer by nature to the poem, requiring a similar engagement from the reader and communicating in a similar way through a fundamentally oral/aural process.

== Awards ==
=== In English ===
Several awards for the short story have highlighted its development in Ireland. Cork hosted the first Frank O'Connor Short Story festival in 2000, as part of which the Frank O'Connor International Short Story Award was established in 2005, and aimed to increase the profile of the short story as a literary form. As of 2016, this award has been discontinued, but past winners include:

Year	Author	Title
2015	Carys Davies	The Redemption of Galen Pike
2014	Colin Barrett	Young Skins
2013	David Constantine	Tea at the Midland and Other Stories
2012	Nathan Englander	What We Talk About When We Talk About Anne Frank
2011	Edna O'Brien	Saints and Sinners
2010	Ron Rash	Burning Bright
2009	Simon Van Booy	Love Begins in Winter
2008	Jhumpa Lahiri	Unaccustomed Earth
2007	Miranda July	No One Belongs Here More Than You
2006	Haruki Murakami	Blind Willow, Sleeping Woman
2005	Yiyun Li	A Thousand Years of Good Prayers

The Rooney Prize for Irish Literature has been awarded to short story collections by Claire Keegan, Keith Ridgway, Philip Ó Ceallaigh and Kevin Barry. Other award-winning authors include Mary Costello (shortlisted for the Guardian First Fiction Award), Sara Baume (winner of the Davy Byrnes Short Story Award), and Billy O'Callaghan (awarded the inaugural Writing.ie Bord Gáis Energy Irish Book Award for the short story).

== See also ==
- Short story
- List of Irish short story writers
- Irish literature
