= List of Irish novelists =

This is a list of novelists either born on the island of Ireland or holding Irish citizenship. Novelists whose work is in Irish are included as well as those whose work is in English.

== A–C ==
- Cecelia Ahern (born 1981)
- Liz Allen (born 1969)
- John Banim (1798–1842)
- Michael Banim (1796–1874)
- John Banville (born 1945)
- Sebastian Barry (born 1955)
- Colin Bateman (born 1962)
- Samuel Beckett (1906–1989)
- Brendan Behan (1923–1964)
- Gerard Beirne (born 1962)
- Maeve Binchy (1940–2012)
- Dermot Bolger (born 1959)
- Elizabeth Bowen (1899–1973)
- John Boyne (born 1971)
- Maeve Brennan (1916–1993)
- Ken Bruen (1951–2025)
- Shan Bullock (1865–1935)
- Angela Bourke (born 1952)
- Anne Burke (fl. 1780–1805)
- Catherine Dorothea Burdett (1784–1861)
- James Wilson Brendale (1876-1965)
- William Carleton (1794–1869)
- Claudia Carroll (born c. 1969)
- Anne-Marie Casey (born 1965)
- Erskine Childers (1870–1922)
- Austin Clarke (1896–1974)
- Brian Cleeve (1921–2003)
- Padraic Colum (1881–1972)
- Julia Crottie (1853–c. 1930)

== D–J ==
- Ita Daly (born 1945)
- Suzanne R. Day (1876–1964)
- Seamus Deane (1940–2021)
- Martina Devlin (living)
- Emma Donoghue (born 1969)
- Gerard Donovan (born 1959)
- Garbhan Downey (born 1966)
- Roddy Doyle (born 1958)
- Catherine Dunne (born 1954)
- Lord Dunsany (1878–1957)
- Charlotte O'Conor Eccles (1860–1911)
- Maria Edgeworth (1767–1849)
- Anne Marie Forrest (born 1967)
- M. E. Francis (1859–1930)
- Tana French (born 1973)
- Miriam Gallagher (born 1940)
- Oliver Goldsmith (1728–1774)
- Gerald Griffin (1803–1840)
- Anna Maria Hall (1800–1881)
- Hugo Hamilton (born 1953)
- Kerry Hardie (born 1951)
- Dermot Healy (1947–2014)
- Aidan Higgins (1927–2015)
- Desmond Hogan (born 1950)
- Arlene Hunt (born 1972)
- Jennifer Johnston (1930–2025)
- Graham Jones (born 1973)
- Neil Jordan (born 1950)
- James Joyce (1882–1941)

== K–N ==
- Ben Kane (born 1970), historical novelist
- Molly Keane (1904–1996)
- Louise Kennedy (born 1967)
- Charles Kickham (1828–1882)
- Mary Isabel Leslie (1899–1978)
- Charles Lever (1806–1872)
- C. S. Lewis (1899–1963)
- Morgan Llywelyn (born 1937)
- Samuel Lover (1797–1868)
- Hannah Lynch (1859–1904)
- Walter Macken (1915–1967)
- Marisa Mackle (born c. 1973)
- Eleanor MacMahon (1864–1956)
- Brinsley MacNamara (1890–1963)
- David Marcus (1924–2009)
- Charles Robert Maturin (1782–1824)
- Patrick McCabe (born 1955)
- Colum McCann (born 1965)
- Barry McCrea (born 1974)
- John McGahern (1934–2006)
- Christina McKenna (born 1957)
- Adrian McKinty (born 1968)
- Charlotte Elizabeth McManus (1850–1941)
- Janet McNeill (1907–1994)
- George McWhirter (born 1939)
- Anna Millikin (fl. 1793–1810)
- Brian Moore (1921–1999)
- George Moore (1852–1933)
- Lady Morgan (Sidney Owenson, c. 1776–1859)
- Sinead Moriarty, (born c. 1971)
- Margaret Mulvihill (born 1954)
- Iris Murdoch (1919–1999)
- C. E. Murphy (born 1973)
- Paul Murray (born 1975)
- Christopher Nolan (1965–2009)

== O–R ==
- Edna O'Brien (1930–2024)
- Billy O'Callaghan (born 1974)
- Philip Ó Ceallaigh (born 1968)
- Joseph O'Connor (born 1963)
- Niamh O'Connor (living)
- Mary O'Donnell (born 1954)
- Maggie O'Farrell (born 1972)
- Liam O'Flaherty (1896–1984)
- Brian O'Nolan (1912–1966)
- Glenn Patterson (born 1961)
- Julie Parsons (born 1951)
- James Plunkett (1920–2003)
- Karl Parkinson (born 1978)
- Keith Ridgway (born 1965)
- Frank Ronan (born 1963)

== S–Z ==
- Patricia Scanlan (born 1956)
- Somerville and Ross (Edith Somerville (1858–1949) and Violet Florence Martin (1862–1915)
- Laurence Sterne (1713–1768)
- Bram Stoker (1847–1912)
- Eithne Strong (1925–1999)
- Francis Stuart (1902–2000)
- Jonathan Swift (1667–1745)
- Kate Thompson (born 1959)
- Colm Tóibín (born 1955)
- William Trevor (1928–2016)
- William Wall (born 1955)
- Oscar Wilde (1854–1900)

== See also ==
- Irish fiction
- Irish literature
- List of Irish people
- List of Irish poets
- List of Irish dramatists
- List of Irish short story writers
