= Orna =

Orna may refer to:

== Dress ==
- Orna (garment), an garment item from South Asia, commonly worn with shalwar kameez

== People ==
- Orna Angel (born 1962), Israeli politician
- Orna Banai (born 1969), Israeli actress, comedian, and entertainer
- Orna Barbivai (born 1962), general in the Israel Defense Forces and Israeli politician
- Orna Ben-Naftali, Israeli legal academic and commentator on human rights in Israel
- Orna Berry, Israeli entrepreneur and scientist
- Orna Ní Choileáin, Irish author and musician
- Orna Datz, Israeli singer, actress and television personality
- Orna Grumberg Israeli computer scientist and academic
- Orna Lin, Israeli labor lawyer
- Orna Ostfeld (born 1952), Israeli basketball player and coach
- Orna Porat (born 1924), Israeli theater actress

== See also ==
- Ornäs, Sweden
