= Michael McLaverty =

Irish writer

- Born: 5 July 1904; Carrickmacross, County Monaghan
- Died: 22 March 1992 (aged 87)
- Education: Queen's University Belfast
- Occupation: teacher
- Writing career
- Notable work: Call My Brother Back (1939)

Michael McLaverty (5 July 1904 – 22 March 1992) was an Irish writer of novels and short stories.

== Background ==
Michael McLaverty was born in Carrickmacross, County Monaghan, to Michael McLaverty (a waiter) and Kathleen Brady. A few years later the family moved to the Beechmount area of Belfast. He went to St Gall's Primary School near the Falls Road, Belfast. He then attended St Malachy's College and Queen's University Belfast where he earned his BSc in 1927 and his MSc in 1933 for a thesis entitled "Earlier Work on the Passage of Electricity through Gases".

For a short period McLaverty lived on Rathlin Island, off the County Antrim coast, where he gained much of the inspiration for his short stories. Upon marrying, he moved to Deramore Drive, Malone, Belfast. In 1928, he had got a Diploma of Education at St Mary's Teacher Training College in London. He worked as a teacher of maths and physics in Belfast for 35 years, firstly at St John's Primary School (1929–57) and then (as headmaster) at St Thomas Secondary School (1957–64).

Joe Graham in his book, Belfast Born Bred And Buttered speaks fondly of having been taught by McLaverty both at St John's and St Thomas's schools. During McLaverty's tenure at the latter, poet Seamus Heaney was one of his staff. Heaney recalled McLaverty's enthusiasm for teaching but also for literature, and McLaverty introduced him to the work of Patrick Kavanagh.

== Writing ==
McLaverty was one of Ireland's most distinguished short story writers, painting with spare intensity the northern landscape of his homeland, the hill farms, rough island terrain and the backstreets of Belfast. He focuses on moments of passion, wonder or bitter disenchantment in lives of struggle. His collected stories are illustrated with woodcuts by Barbara Childs, and including an introduction by Seamus Heaney and a foreword by Sophia Hillan,

Heaney summarised McLaverty's contribution: "His voice was modestly pitched, he never sought the limelight, yet for all that, his place in our literature is secure." In the introduction to McLaverty's Collected Short Stories, Heaney describes the writing: "His tact and pacing, in the individual sentence and the overall story, are beautiful: in his best work, the elegiac is bodied forth in perfectly pondered images and rhythms". Heaney's poem Fosterage, in the sequence Singing School from North (1975) is dedicated to him.

== Works ==
- Call My Brother Back (1939)
- Lost Fields (1941)
- The White Mare and Other Stories (1943)
- In This Thy Day (1945)
- The Game Cock and Other Stories (1947)
- The Three Brothers (1948)
- Truth in the Night (1951)
- School for Hope (1954)
- The Choice (1958)
- The Brightening Day (1965)
- The Road to the Shore (1976)
- Collected Short Stories (1978)
- In Quiet Places: Uncollected Stories, Letters and Critical Prose (1989)

== See also ==
- Irish fiction
- Irish literature
- List of Irish novelists
