= Oghma =

Oghma may refer to:

- Ogma, champion of the Tuatha Dé Danann in Irish mythology
- Oghma (Forgotten Realms), interpretation of the mythological Ogma by the game Dungeons and Dragons
- Oghma (magazine), defunct Irish-language literary journal
