= Oghma (magazine) =

Oghma was a literary journal in the Irish language. It was published from 1989 to 1998, and replaced by the journal An Aimsir Óg. It included the works of Sean Mac Mathuna, Micheál Ó Conghaile and others.
