= Áine Ní Dhioraí =

Irish author and broadcaster

Áine Ní Dhioraí, Irish author and broadcaster.

Ní Dhioraí was once Head of News at RTÉ Raidió na Gaeltachta. She is a native of County Donegal. Her book, Na Cruacha: Scéalta agus Seanchas, a compilation of folklore collected in the 1900s, was published by Cló Iar-Chonnacht.
