= Sophia Hillan =

Writer and critic from Northern Ireland

- Born: Sophia Hillan c. 1950; Belfast

Sophia Hillan (c. 1950), is a writer, critic and academic from Northern Ireland.

== Life ==
From the Falls Road, Belfast, Sophia Hillan was born c 1950 and attended St Dominic's Grammar School for Girls. Hillan graduated in 1972 with a Bachelor of Arts in English from Queen's University Belfast, followed by a doctorate.

Hillan studied under Seamus Heaney and later worked with him when she taught in Carysfort College of Education in Dublin. She was shortlisted for the Hennessy Award in 1980 and was awarded prizes by both Sam Hanna Bell and David Marcus.

Hillan moved back to Northern Ireland in 1983. She then began a more academic career and put her fiction writing on hold for several years. Hillan was the associate director of the Institute of Irish Studies in Queen's University, Belfast from 1993 to 2003. She was director of the International Summer School in Irish Studies.

Hillan has won awards for her short stories and they have been featured on BBC. She has written fiction and edited the fiction of others as well as written about them, particularly Michael McLaverty. She also writes as Sophia Hillan King.

She married and had two children, Judith and John King.

== Bibliography ==
- In Quiet Places - The Uncollected Stories, Letters and Critical Prose of Micheal McLaverty, (1989)
- The silken twine: a study of the works of Michael McLaverty, (1992)
- Collected short stories: Michael McLaverty, (2002)
- May, Lou and Cass: Jane Austen’s Nieces in Ireland, (2011)
- The Friday Tree, (2014)
- The Way We Danced, (2016)
- The Cocktail Hour, (2018)
