= Daithí Ó Muirí =

Daithí Ó Muirí is a writer of fiction in the Irish language. He was born in County Monaghan but now lives in the Cois Fharraige district of Connemara.

Ó Muirí has published four collections of short stories and a longer work called Ré (Epoch). He was granted a bursary of 10,000 euros by the Arts Council of Ireland to aid him in his literary work. His collection Cogaí (Wars) won an important literary prize in 2001 in the Cló Iar-Chonnacht Literary Award Competition. The adjudicators referred to the savagery and vitality of the writing.

His work has been praised for its assured and engaging style and its surrealistic atmosphere.

== Works ==
- Seacht Lá na Díleann. Cló Iar-Chonnacht Teo 2013.
- Ré. Cló Iar-Chonnacht Teo 2012.
- Ceolta. Cló Iar-Chonnacht Teo 2006.
- Cogaí. Cló Iar-Chonnacht Teo 2002.
- Uaigheanna agus Scéalta Eile. Cló Iar-Chonnacht Teo 2002.
