= Frank Ronan =

Irish novelist

Frank Ronan (born in May 1963 in New Ross, County Wexford) is an Irish novelist. He also writes a monthly column for Gardens Illustrated magazine. His novels have won numerous prizes including the 1989 Irish Times/Aer Lingus prize.

== Works ==
- The Men Who loved Evelyn Cotton (1989)
- Picnic in Eden (1991)
- The Better Angel (1993)
- Dixie Chicken (1994)
- Lovely (1995)
- Handsome Men Are Slightly Sunburnt (1996)
- Home (2002)
