= Pádraig Ó Cíobháin =

Irish-language novelist and short story writer

Pádraig Ó Cíobháin (born 1951) is an Irish-language novelist and short story writer.

Ó Cíobháin was born in Ballyferriter, an Irish-speaking district in West Kerry, and was educated at Ferriter National School, St. Brendan's College, Killarney and University College Cork. As of 2011, he lived in Bearna, west of Galway. From 2003 to 2005 he was Irish Language Writer in Residence at the National University of Ireland, Galway. He has also worked as a tutor in Roinn na Gaeilge (the Irish Language Department) of that university.

== Writing ==
Ó Cíobháin has been described, by Gabriel Rosenstock, as a writer "who refuses to compromise". A central theme in his work is the problematic sexual relationships between men and women. It has been argued that his deepest interest is in the workings of the mind and the psyche, expressed within the framework of physical sensuality. "There is sparse use of dialogue and a mingling of realism and unreality".

== Books ==
- De Chion Focal (Coiscéim 2015)
- Novella Eile (Coiscéim 2014)
- Dréachta Chrích Fódla: Imleabhar 1 (Coiscéim 2007)
- Ré an Charbaid (Coiscéim 2003)
- Faightear Gach Laoch in Aisce (Coiscéim 2001)
- Tá Solas ná hÉagann Choíche (Coiscéim 1999)
- Ar Gach Maoilinn Tá Síocháin (Coiscéim 1998)
- Desiderius a Dó (Coiscéim 1996)
- An Grá faoi Cheilt (Coiscéim 1992)
- An Gealas i Lár na Léithe (Coiscéim 1992)
- Le Gealaigh (Coiscéim 1991).
