= Margaret Mulvihill =

Irish writer (born 1954)

Margaret Mulvihill (born 8 March 1954) is an Irish writer. She has published four novels and many works of non-fiction.

== Life ==
Margaret Mulvihill was born in Dublin and studied history and politics at University College Dublin. She completed her M.A. in economic and social history at Birkbeck, University of London.

Reviewing Mulvihill's first novel, Natural Selection (1985), Eden Ross Lipson wrote in The New York Times: "The plotting may be operetta-awkward, but the prose is often wicked and consistently amusing."

Hilary Bailey reviewed Mulvihill's second novel, Low Overheads (1987), in The Guardian: "Margaret Mulvihill is a natural writer and bounds along comically with verve and energy, side-swiping St Perrier and the blessed Placenta and many other targets as she runs."

Mary Morrissy wrote in The Independent about Mulvihill's third novel, St Patrick's Daughter (1994): "Mulvihill has a deft comic touch and a sure hand with verbal slapstick. The irreverent subtext, littered with the superstitious vocabulary of the catechism – purgatory, baptisms of desire, the children of Fatima - brings alive the world of Irish Catholicism, in all its richness and trumpery, far more effectively than a grim dose of realism."

Her non-fiction work includes a biography of Charlotte Despard (1989), a biography of Benito Mussolini (1990), an account of the French Revolution (1989) and The Treasury of Saints and Martyrs (1999).

She was a UEA Writing Fellow at the University of East Anglia in 1989. She has contributed to New Writings Two, published by the British Council, the Oxford Dictionary of National Biography, The Electronic British Library Journal, and the Fish Anthology, 2007.

== Works ==
=== Novels ===
- Natural Selection, Pandora, 1985. ISBN 978-0-86358-058-1
- Low Overheads, Pandora, 1987. ISBN 978-0-86358-140-3
- Saint Patrick’s Daughter, Sceptre,1994. ISBN 978-0-340-59774-3 (serialised on Woman's Hour)
- The Leaving Coat, Kindle Edition, 2013. ISBN 978-1-301378050

=== Non-fiction ===
- The French Revolution, Franklin Watts, 1989, ISBN 978-0-531-17167-7
- Roman Forts, Gloucester Press, 1989, ISBN 978-0-7496-6822-8
- Charlotte Despard: A Biography, London, 1989. ISBN 978-0-04-440446-0
- The Treasury of Saints and Martyrs, Marshall Editions/Viking, 1999. ISBN 978-1-84028-205-4
