= Liz Weir =

Irish author

- Born: October 21, 1950; Belfast, Northern Ireland
- Occupations: Writer and storyteller
- Writing career
- Pen name: Liz Weir
- Genre: Children
- Website: www.lizweirstoryteller.com

Liz Weir MBE (born October 21, 1950) is a Northern Irish children's writer and storyteller. She is currently Storyteller in Residence in Belfast and has written 27 stories. She is involved in a number of storytelling organisations including The Early Years Organisation, where she talks to children about racism, anti-bullying and respect for the elderly.

== Life ==
Weir was timid as a child and unlikely to attend social events. If she did, it would be as a wallflower. She was Children’s librarian in the city of Belfast.

After working as a librarian in Belfast from the 1970s Weir now works as a children's author and storyteller. She was the first children's librarian for Belfast city. When not touring Ireland and the globe telling stories Weir runs the Ballyeamon Camping Barn in Glenarriff which is a hostel but also hosts music and stories. Weir works with the Writers in Schools Scheme to bring access to children and has written fifteen books for the Thinking Skills and Personal Capabilities curriculum for Northern Ireland.

In 1988, Weir was invited to Dublin where she would be meeting Roald Dahl, someone she had been a fan of all her life. Along with her daughter, she took the train down to Dublin and was greeted in her hotel by Dahl himself. He shook their hands and called her daughter a 'spoilt little devil.' He then left and Weir told a story of Dahl's to ease the wait. As the story continued she noticed that Dahl had returned and was listening to her telling the story.

In 2016 Weir became the Storyteller In Residence at Tullycarnet Library in the Knock area of Belfast. She has been the Director of the Ulster Storytelling Festival. Weir has also worked as the presenter on a BBC Radio Ulster program called The Gift of the Gab.

Weir was involved in an incident with EasyJet while attempting to take a short flight from Belfast to Edinburgh, Scotland in June 2024. Weir had a speaking engagement that night in Edinburgh, and arrived at the airport gate over 2 hours early for the flight. Both Weir and another passenger used wheelchairs, and waited for the rest of the passengers to board. However, the plane crew closed up the boarding stairs and did not allow Weir, the other wheelchair-using passenger, and that other passenger's husband to board, abandoning the three while absconding with their already packed luggage. The ground staff frantically tried to flag down the crew, and Weir said the pilot could see her, yet the plane left anyway. Weir ultimately missed her engagement.

The author lives and works in Cushendall, Co Antrim in Northern Ireland.

== Awards ==
Liz Weir won the inaugural International Story Bridge Award of the National Storytelling Network in 2002. Weir has been nominated for the Astrid Lindgren Award in 2014.

Liz was awarded an MBE for services to the Arts and Education in January 2019.

== Bibliography ==
- Boom-chicka-boom Gill & Macmillan, Dublin 1995, ISBN 0-86278-417-4 .
- Boom-chicka-boom 2 O'Brien Press Ltd, Dublin 1998, ISBN 0-86278-469-7 .
- Here, There and Everywhere: Stories from Many Lands O'Brien Press Ltd, Dublin 2005, ISBN 0-86278-869-2 .
- Telling the Tale: storytelling Guide Library Assn. (Youth Lib.Gp.), 1989, ISBN 0-946581-08-8 .
- Stand Up and Tell Them Adare P, 1991, ISBN 0-9516686-2-5 .
- When Dad was away Frances Lincoln Books
- Tales from the road

=== Television cartoons ===
- Together in the park
