= Micheál Ó Conghaile (writer) =

Irish-language writer (born 1962)

Micheál Ó Conghaile (born 1962) is an Irish-language writer who lives in Indreabhán, County Galway, Ireland. He was born on the island of Inishtravin in Conamara and was raised in an Irish-speaking community.

== Cló Iar-Chonnacht ==
In 1985 Ó Conghaile founded the Irish-language publishing company Cló Iar-Chonnacht. It publishes books, music and spoken word albums. It is one of the few such companies that employ full-time editors, and he founded it because many Connemara poets and writers were still unpublished. He believes in the importance of publishing both popular works and those with a very high literary standard.

His own work includes short stories, a novel, drama, poetry and history. He has translated Martin McDonagh's plays The Beauty Queen of Leenane and The Lonesome West. Ó Conghaile's awards include The Butler Literary Award of the Irish American Cultural Institute (1997) and the 1997 Hennessy Literary Award for his short story "Athair".

He was a writer in residence at Queen's University, Belfast, and at the University of Ulster at Coleraine between 1999 and 2002. His works have been translated into Romanian, Croatian, Albanian, German and English.

== Bibliography ==
- Mac an tSagairt, Gallimh, Cló Iar-Chonnacht, 1986
- Comhrá Caillí, 1987
- Up Seanamhach!, 1990
- Conamara agus Árainn 1880–1980, 1993
- Gnéithe d’Amhráin Chonamara ár Linne, 1993
- An Fear a Phléasc, 1997
- Sna Fir, 1999
- Seachrán Jeaic Sheáin Johnny, 2002
- An Fear nach nDéanann Gáire, 2003
- Cúigear Chonamara/The Connemara Five, Úna Ní Chonchúir, 2007
- Jude/Gaeilgeoir Deireanach Charna/Incubus, with Breandán Ó hEaghra and Caitríona Ní Chonaola, 2007
- Cúigear Chonamara/The Connemara Five, Úna Ní Chonchúir, 2007
- Go dTaga do Ríocht, 2009
- Na Trí Mhialtóg, 2012
- Diabhlaíocht Dé, 2015
- Sa Teach Seo Anocht, 2019
- Nollaig Oileánach, 2022
- An Bhlaosc sa mBois, 2024

== Literary criticism ==
- Teanga don Tost , (Arlen House) Seán Mac Risteaird, 2024
- An Fear a Dhéanann Gaisce, (Arlen House) edited by Ciarán Mac Murchaidh and Seán Mac Risteaird, 2025
- An Chruinne Fhireann, (Arlen House) Sorcha de Brún, 2025
