= Inishtravin =

Island in County Galway, Ireland

Native name: Inis Treabhair
- Location within island of Ireland

Geography
- Location: Atlantic Ocean
- Coordinates: 53°19′N 9°40′W
- Area: 0.94 km^{2} (0.36 sq mi)
- Highest elevation: 14 m (46 ft)

Administration
- Ireland
- Province: Connacht
- County: Galway

Demographics
- Population: 0 (2024)

Inishtravin (Irish: Inis Treabhair) is a small island and townland off the coast of Connemara, County Galway, Ireland. It is currently uninhabited.

Inishtravin

Climate chart (precipitation, max. and min. temperature)
J	F	M	A	M	J	J	A	S	O	N	D
0 4 −1	0 4 0	0 8 2	0 13 6	0 12 5	0 18 6	0 17 9	0 14 9	0 12 7	0 12 6	0 10 4	0 5 2
- █ Average max. and min. temperatures in °C
- █ Precipitation totals in mm
Imperial conversion
J	F	M	A	M	J	J	A	S	O	N	D
0 39 30	0 39 32	0 46 36	0 55 43	0 54 41	0 64 43	0 63 48	0 57 48	0 54 45	0 54 43	0 50 39	0 41 36
- █ Average max. and min. temperatures in °F
- █ Precipitation totals in inches

== Demographics ==
Historical population

Year	Pop.	±%
1841	93	—
1851	95	+2.2%
1861	138	+45.3%
1871	158	+14.5%
1881	130	−17.7%
1891	105	−19.2%
1901	89	−15.2%
1911	93	+4.5%

Year	Pop.	±%
1926	102	+9.7%
1936	65	−36.3%
1946	50	−23.1%
1951	42	−16.0%
1956	45	+7.1%
1961	41	−8.9%
1966	42	+2.4%
1971	34	−19.0%

Year	Pop.	±%
1979	17	−50.0%
1981	7	−58.8%
1986	7	+0.0%
1991	4	−42.9%
1996	3	−25.0%
2002	1	−66.7%
2006	1	+0.0%

Source: Central Statistics Office. "CNA17: Population by Off Shore Island, Sex and Year". CSO.ie.
