= Julia Crottie =

Irish novelist

Julia M. Crottie
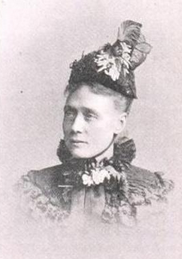
- Julia M. Crottie, from a 1901 publication.
- Born: 1853; Lismore, County Waterford
- Died: c.1930
- Occupation: Writer

Julia M. Crottie (1853 – about 1930), sometimes seen as Julia Crotty, was an Irish novelist who detailed rural life in Ireland, writing during the late 19th and early 20th centuries.

== Early life ==
Crottie was born in 1853 in Lismore, County Waterford. She was educated at the Presentation Convent school in Waterford, before emigrating to America.

== Career ==
=== Writing ===
Crottie wrote short stories and novels, and contributed to periodicals, including Catholic World. Her stories about Ireland featured satirical portrayals of the people who emigrated from Ireland, returned or never got to emigrate. Her work portrayed some of the less pleasant features of small town rural Ireland. Many of her stories were set in fictional Innesdoyle, substantially based on Lismore, of which she wrote, "Nobody who has not lived in a stagnant town like Innisdoyle can know to what blackness of malice... suspicion may lead".

=== Reception ===
Crottie was compared by the Glasgow Herald to Edgeworth and Carleton. She was a correspondent of Katharine Tynan and of Edmund Downey, among other Irish literary figures. "I have heard it said that Miss Crottie shows us too much of what is unlovely and pitiful, and mean", commented critic Justin McCarthy in 1901, "but the complaint seems to me to be about as unreasonable as it would be to find fault with Charles Dickens" for similar unlikeable characters. Crottie's first novel, Neighbors, was presented to King Edward VII when he stayed at Lismore Castle in 1904.

== Personal life ==
She moved from the United States to the Isle of Man for a time. She died about 1930, in her seventies.

== Selected works ==
- The Nest in Kilcrona (serialized novel in The Current, 1883)
- Neighbours: Annals of a Dull Town (novel, 1900)
- The Lost Land: A Tale of a Cromwellian-Irish Town, Being the Autobiography of Miss Annita Lombard, 1780-87 (novel, 1901)
- Innisdoyle Neighbours (novel, 1920)
