= Martina Devlin =

Irish columnist and novelist

- Born: Omagh, County Tyrone, Northern Ireland
- Occupation: Writer
- Writing career
- Genres: Historical, Non-fiction, Speculative

Martina Devlin is a novelist and newspaper columnist from Northern Ireland.

== Biography ==
Devlin was born in Omagh, County Tyrone, Northern Ireland. She worked in Fleet Street for seven years before moving to Dublin. In England, she studied journalism, followed by a degree in English Literature at the University of London (Birkbeck College). After working as a journalist for the Press Association, Devlin went to Trinity College, Dublin where she completed an MPhil in Anglo-Irish Literature followed by a PhD in literary practice, also at Trinity College. Afterwards, she combined working as a columnist for the Irish Independent in Dublin with writing novels. Devlin does not write by genre. Five of her books are historical fiction and another is speculative fiction.

She has written of her unsuccessful efforts at IVF and the toll it took on her marriage. In 2012 she married RTE journalist David Murphy.

A former vice-chairperson of the Irish Writers Centre, she holds a diploma in company direction from the Institute of Directors. In the wake of her novel, The House Where It Happened, she campaigned for eight years for a plaque to commemorate the Islandmagee witches, and one was erected in 2023.

== Awards ==
Devlin has won numerous awards for both her writing and journalism.

- 1996 Hennessy Literary Award for her first short story
- 2009 Writer-in-residence at the Princess Grace Irish Library in Monaco
- 2010 GALA columnist of the year
- 2011 National Newspapers of Ireland columnist of the year
- 2012 Royal Society of Literature's VS Pritchett short story award for her short story Singing Dumb.

She has been shortlisted three times for the Irish Book of the Year awards. Her non-fiction account of the Irish financial collapse, Banksters, co-authored with David Murphy, topped the best seller list for eight weeks.

== Bibliography ==
=== Fiction ===
- Three Wise Men (London, HarperCollins, 2000)
- Be Careful What You Wish For (HarperCollins, 2001)
- Venus Reborn (Dublin, Poolbeg Press, 2003)
- Temptation (Poolbeg Press, 2004)
- Ship of Dreams (Poolbeg Press, 2007)
- The House Where It Happened (Poolbeg/Ward River Press, 2014)
- About Sisterland (Poolbeg/Ward River Press, 2015)
- Truth & Dare: Short Stories About Women Who Shaped Ireland (Poolbeg Press, 2018)
- Edith - A Novel (Lilliput Press, 2022)
- Call Me Madame [a play] (Arlen House, 2022)
- Charlotte - A Novel (Lilliput Press, 2024)
- Glorious Monsters (The Lilliput Press, 2026)

=== Non-fiction ===
- The Hollow Heart: The True Story of How One Woman’s Desire to Have a Baby Almost Destroyed Her Life (London, Penguin Books, 2005)
- Banksters, with David Murphy (Dublin, Hachette Books Ireland, 2009).

Other work

Theatre work includes Call Me Madame, a political satire featuring Countess Markievicz. Another play, Curves of Emotion, about James Joyce and Nora Barnacle, was written to commission to mark the Ulysses centenary in 2022.

She has taught Irish literature for Trinity College Dublin, Boston University and Palacky University in the Czech Republic.

In 2025 she was one of the judges for the Dublin Literary Award.
