= Miriam Gallagher =

Playwright and author

- Born: 11 February 1940; Waterford, Ireland
- Died: 15 January 2018 (aged 77)
- Occupation: Writer
- Writing career
- Pen name: Miriam Gallagher

Miriam Gallagher (born 1940) was an Irish playwright and author whose works have been performed globally and translated into numerous languages.

== Biography ==
Born Born Miriam O’Connor in Waterford to Michael O’Connor, a bank manager with 5 children including Valerie, Michael and Fidelma. Gallagher went to school in the Convent of the Sacred Heart in Roscrea, County Tipperary and in Bregenz, Austria. She went to college in both the University of London and University College Dublin. After college Gallagher worked initially as a speech and language therapist, an occupation which led to the publication of one of her non fiction books. Gallagher also studied drama in London, in LAMDA under Frieda Hodgson.

She was commissioned to write essays for The Irish Times, Irish Medical Times and journals. Gallagher took up writing screenplays and stage plays. The result is a list of productions which have been staged around the world as well as broadcast by RTÉ and the BBC.

Her varied work from play to speech therapy, as well as working with prisoners, and led her to be a visiting lecturer at universities across the globe. Gallagher was deeply involved in the organisations of her craft, leading her to being a member of Irish PEN, both on its committee and as vice president, on the Irish Writers' Union committee as well as a council member of the Society of Irish Playwrights. Over the years she won a number of awards.

Her husband was Gerhardt Gallagher. They lived in Dublin and had children Mia, Donnacha and Etain. In 2012 Gallagher was diagnosed with cancer and kidney disease and she died in 2018.

== Awards ==
- Arts Council and European Script Fund Awards.
- MHA TV Script Award
- EU Theatre Award
- Writer's Exchange to Finland
- In 2006 The Parting Glass was a prizewinner of an international playwrighting competition
- In 2008 Doracha Mór agus Seoltóirí Ghaoth Dobhair won best script
- She has presented work at Semaine Mondiale des Auteurs Vivants de Théâtre in Marseilles

== Works ==
=== Film and screenplays ===
- Gypsies
- Girls in Silk Kimonos

=== Commissions ===
- The Ring of Mont de Balison (Ranelagh Millennium Project)
- Kalahari Blues (Galloglass Theatre Co)
- The Gold of Tradaree (Clare Co. Council)
- The Mighty Oak of Riverwood (Betty Ann Norton Theatre School)
- Fancy Footwork (Dublin Theatre Festival)

=== Collected plays ===
- Fancy Footwork(Soc. Irish Playwrights, 1997, 2nd Ed.)
- Kalahari Blues(Mirage, 2006)
- The Gold of Tradaree (Mirage, 2008)
- Green Rain~ Irish Composers on Stage(Mirage, 2011)
- A Wasteland Harvest (Mirage, 2014)

=== Books and story collections ===
- Song for Salamander (2004, Trafford)
- Let's Help Our Children Talk (1977, Dublin O’Brien Press)
- Pusakis at Paros & Other Stories (Trafford 2008)
- Night in Havana & Other Stories (Dublin, Mirage 2017)
