= Cló Iar-Chonnacht =

Irish publisher and record label

- Founded: 1985
- Founder: Micheál Ó Conghaile
- Country of origin: Ireland
- Headquarters location: Inverin, County Galway, Ireland
- Distribution: ÁIS (Ireland); Dufour Editions (US)
- Publication types: Books, Albums
- Nonfiction topics: Irish language, Irish culture, Gaelic revival
- Official website: www.cic.ie

Cló Iar-Chonnacht (CIC; Irish pronunciation: [ˌklˠoː iəɾˠ ˈxɔn̪ˠəxt̪ˠ]; "West Connacht Press") is an Irish language publishing company founded in 1985 by writer Micheál Ó Conghaile, a native speaker of Irish from Inis Treabhair in Connemara. He set the company up while still a student.

== Work ==
CIC publishes poetry, short stories, novels, children's books, non-fiction and historical works. CIC also publishes bilingual books and books in English, most of the latter being translations of important works in Irish.

CIC also issues recordings of traditional music, one of the original aims being to record sean-nós singers from Conamara. The range of music has been extended to include such genres as Cajun music and the music of Cape Breton. Spoken word recordings are also available.

A stated aim of CIC is to draw local and international attention to writers and musicians who work through Irish. To date over three hundred books have been published, along with many albums.

In 2019 CIC took over Cois Life publishers.

== See also ==
- Sáirséal agus Dill
- Gael Linn
- Coiscéim
