= Orna Ní Choileáin =

Irish writer from West Cork

Orna Ní Choileáin is an Irish writer from West Cork. She writes Irish language fiction books for both adults and children, as well as poetry and drama. She has won prizes for her creative prose, poetry, drama and theatre, and short-story writing at Oireachtas na Gaeilge and other Gaelic festivals. Éilís Ní Dhuibhne reviewed her recent work under the writers' mentoring scheme organised by Clár na Leabhar Gaeilge in 2007.

Ní Choileáin's first collection of Irish language short stories Canary Wharf was published by Cois Life in 2009. From this collection, Canary Wharf was selected for Great Irish Book Week 2009. A short film (Pairtnéir) for the Scéal Series was based on the short story "Saineolaí Teicneolaí". The short story "Camino" was selected for European Best Fiction 2010 and published by Dalkey Archive Press. Five stories from the book ("Saineolaí Teicneolaí"; "Canary Wharf"; "Cosaint Sonraí"; "Cúrsa Eitilte"; "Mil") were prescribed on the Leaving Certificate Irish Syllabus.

Gabriel Rosenstock also reviewed Ní Choileáin's work under the mentoring scheme in 2012. Her second collection of short stories, Sciorrann an tAm, was published 2014 and was nominated for Gradam Uí Shúilleabháin (Irish Language Book of the Year).

Her work for younger readers includes Ailfí agus an Vaimpír (Cois Life 2012), which was shortlisted for Gradam Réics Carló (Irish Language Young People's Book of the Year) in 2012. The sequel Vaimpír san Áiléar (Cois Life 2013) was shortlisted in 2013 and was awarded first prize in the literary awards by Oireachtas na Gaeilge for Young Adult fiction. I Measc Vaimpírí (Cois Life 2015) is the third instalment to the series and was also awarded a prize by Oireachtas na Gaeilge. The final instalment, Greim na Vaimpíre, was published in 2017.

The Arts Council has supported the work of Orna Ní Choileáin and she has been reviewed in The Irish Times and Children's Books Ireland's Inis Magazine.

== Works ==
=== Books for young people ===
- Ailfí agus an vaimpír (2012)
- Vaimpír san áiléar (2013)
- I measc vaimpírí (2015)
- Bóthar na rós (2015)
- Morf (2016)
- Greim na vaimpíre (2017)

=== Short stories ===
- Sciorrann an tAm (2014)
- Canary wharf (2009)
- Leigheas

=== Books for learners of Irish ===
- Bóthar na rós (2015)
