= Seán Mac Mathúna =

Irish writer

Seán Mac Mathúna was an Irish writer whose work has been published in both Irish and English.

== Biography ==
He was born in Tralee, County Kerry and attended University College Cork.

He began his literary career as a writer of short stories, a number of which were published in Irish in Comhar and in English in the Irish Times and the Irish Press. In 1983 his first collection, entitled Ding (Wedge), was published by An Comhlacht Oideachais. His second Irish-language collection, Banana, was published by Cois Life in 1999, and won Gradam Uí Shúilleabháin /Irish Book of the Year Award. In 2005 his selected short stories were published by Cois Life under the title Úlla (Apples).

Mac Mathúna has written four novels. One of them, entitled Gealach (Moon), was published by Leabhar Breac in 2012 and won an Oireachtas prize.

Mac Mathúna is also a playwright. In 1992 the Abbey Theatre produced The Winter Thief/Gadaí Géar na Geamhoíche in English and Irish on alternate nights, using the same cast. In 1999 the Taibhdhearc Theatre in Galway produced his play Hula Hul.

A selection of his work can be heard on the audiobook Niall Tóibín ag léamh gearrscéalta le Seán Mac Mathúna (Niall Tóibín reading short stories by Seán Mac Mathúna) (Cois Life, 2009).

He has expressed the view that literary inspiration is something closely tied to the deepest sources of our humanity: "But writers are reluctant to talk about inspiration because it’s an acknowledgment, perhaps, that they didn’t write the story themselves but that it came into existence because of the will of a source which is higher than us". He has also said that he prefers the Irish language versions of his work.

Mac Mathúna died on 26 December 2025 in Dublin.

== Novels ==
- Cros na Sceilge (Coiscéim, 2013)
- Gealach (Leabhar Breac, 2012)
- Scéal Eitleáin (Coiscéim, 2005)

== Short stories ==
- Úlla (Cois Life, 2005)
- Banana (Cois Life, 1999)
- Ceardlann 85 (Coiscéim, 1988)
- Ding agus Scéalta Eile (An Comhlacht Oideachais, 1983)
- The Atheist and Other Stories (Wolfhound, 1987) (the author’s translation of the stories in Ding agus Scéalta Eile)
- Blas (An Comhlacht Oideachais, 1979)
- Ráfla (An Comhlacht Oideachais, 1978)
