= Billy O'Callaghan =

Irish short fiction writer (born 1974)

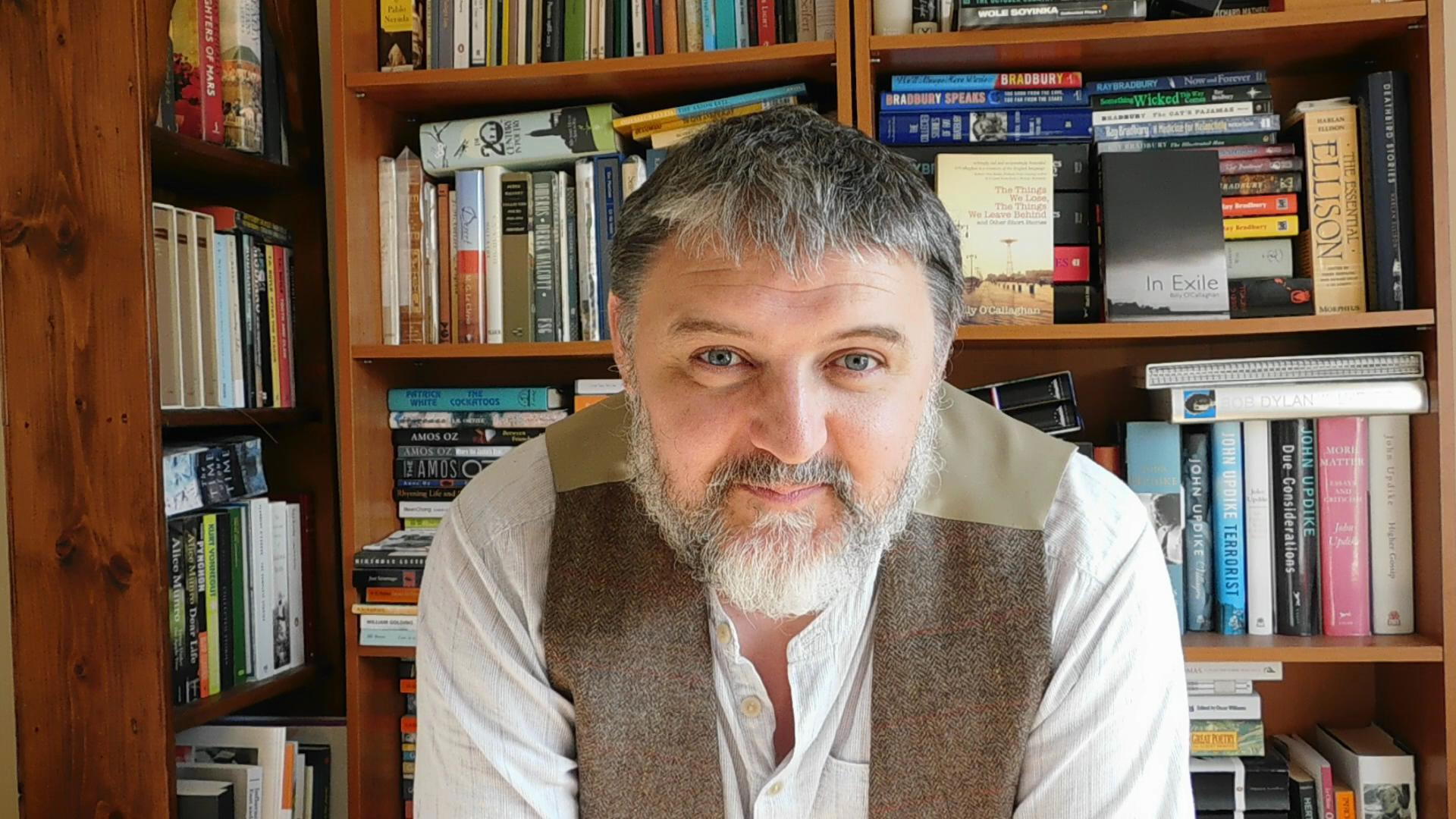
- Billy O'Callaghan (August 2016)
- Born: 9 December 1974 (age 51); Cork, Ireland
- Occupation: Writer
- Writing career
- Period: 1999–present
- Notable works: The Things We Lose, The Things We Leave Behind. My Coney Island Baby. Life Sentences
- Movement: Irish Short Story
- Website: www.billyocallaghan.ie/en/bibliography/

Billy O'Callaghan (born 9 December 1974) is an Irish short fiction writer and novelist. He is best known for his short-story collection The Things We Lose, The Things We Leave Behind, which was awarded the Bord Gáis Energy Irish Book Award for the short story in 2013 and his widely translated novel My Coney Island Baby, which was shortlisted for the Royal Society of Literature's Encore Award.

== Early life ==
Billy O'Callaghan was born in Cork in 1974, and grew up in Douglas village, where he still lives.

== Literary career ==
His first collection of short stories, In Exile, was published by Mercier Press in 2008. This was followed a year later by a second collection, In Too Deep (also published by Mercier Press). In 2013, his third collection, The Things We Lose, The Things We Leave Behind, was published by New Island Books. His short stories have been published in literary journals around the world, and translated into several other languages. His work has been broadcast on RTÉ Radio 1's The Book On One, Sunday Miscellany and the Francis McManus Award series.

In 2017, Ploughshares published O'Callaghan's story A Death in the Family as a Ploughshares Solo.

O'Callaghan's first novel, The Dead House, was published in Ireland by Brandon, an imprint of O'Brien Press, in 2017, and in North America by Arcade Publishing in 2018.

His novel, My Coney Island Baby, was published in 2019, by Jonathan Cape (UK) and Harper (USA), as well as in French by Éditions Grasset as Les amants de Coney Island, translated by Carine Chichereau, Dutch by Ambo Anthos as Mijn lief op Coney Island, translated by Lette Vos, German by btb Verlag as Die Liebenden von Coney Island, translated by Sibylle Schmidt Czech by Nakladatelství Paseka as Náš Coney Island, translated by Petr Eliáš, Catalan by L'Altra Editorial as Els amants de Coney Island, translated by Ferran Ràfols Gesa, Italian by Guanda Editore as My Coney Island Baby, translated by Ada Arduini, Hungarian by Jelenkor as Szerelmem, Coney Island, translated by Zoltán Pék and in Turkish by Othello Kitap as Coney Island Bebeğim, translated by Serkan Toy.

A new short story collection, The Boatman and Other Stories, was published in January 2020 by Jonathan Cape (UK) and Harper Perennial (USA).

A new novel Life Sentences was published in 2021 by Jonathan Cape (UK) and in Czech by Nakladatelství Paseka as Doživotí, translated by Petr Eliáš, and in 2022 in the US by David R. Godine.

== Awards ==
In November 2013, "The Things We Lose, The Things We Leave Behind" won the inaugural Short Story of the Year Award at the 2013 Bord Gáis Energy Irish Book Award; "Down by the River" was selected in 2014 as Ireland's representative in the ongoing UNESCO Cities of Literature project; and "The Boatman" was a finalist for the 2016 Costa Short Story Award. In June 2020, My Coney Island Baby was shortlisted for the Royal Society of Literature's Encore Award.

== Bibliography ==
=== Short story collections ===
- In Exile (2008)
- In Too Deep (2009)
- The Things We Lose, The Things We Leave Behind (2013)
- The Boatman and Other Stories (2020)

=== Novels ===
- The Dead House (2017)
- My Coney Island Baby (2019)
- Life Sentences (2021)
- The Paper Man (2023)
