= Éilís Ní Dhuibhne =

Irish novelist

- Born: 22 February 1954 (age 72); Dublin, Ireland
- Education: University College Dublin (UCD); University of Copenhagen
- Occupations: Writer, Academic
- Writing career
- Pen name: Eilis Almquist; Elizabeth O'Hara
- Genres: Novel, Play, Short Story
- Website: www.eilisnidhuibhne.com

Éilís Ní Dhuibhne (pronounced [ˈeːlʲiːʃ n̠ʲiː ˈɣɪvʲnʲə]; born 22 February 1954), also known as Eilis Almquist and Elizabeth O'Hara, is an Irish novelist and short story writer who writes both in Irish and English. She has been shortlisted for the Orange Prize for Fiction, and is a recipient of the Irish PEN Award.

Éilís Ní Dhuibhne was appointed Laureate for Irish Fiction in 2025.

== Biography ==
Ní Dhuibhne was born in Dublin in 1954. She attended University College Dublin (UCD), where she studied Pure English for her BA, did an M Phil in Middle English and Old Irish, and finished in 1982 with a PhD in Folklore She was awarded the UCD Entrance scholarship for English, and two post-graduate scholarships in Folklore. In 1978-9 she studied at the Folklore Institute in the University of Copenhagen while researching her doctoral thesis, and in 1982 was awarded a PhD from the National University of Ireland (NUI). About her time in Denmark, Ní Dhuibhne states that she "kind of discovered feminism there", because it "was more liberal and advanced politically and in terms of feminism". She has worked in the Department of Irish Folklore in UCD, and for many years as a curator in the National Library of Ireland. Also a teacher of Creative Writing, she has been Writer Fellow at Trinity College Dublin and is currently Writer Fellow at UCD. She is a member of Aosdána since 2004, an ambassador for the Irish Writers' Centre, and President of the Folklore of Ireland Society (An Cumann le Béaloideas Éireann). Ní Dhuibhne is the Burns Visiting Scholar at Boston College for the fall 2020 semester.

Ní Dhuibhne was married to the Swedish folklorist Bo Almqvist for 30 years until he died suddenly due to a short illness in 2013. She has two children: Ragnar and Olaf. Éilís Ní Dhuibne wrote the memoir Twelve Thousand Days: A Memoir of Love and Loss about her and her late husband's time together, named after the number of days they were married.

Further information on Éilís Ní Dhuibhne's work may be found in Rebecca Pelan, ed, Éilís Ní Dhuibhne: Perspectives. Galway, Arlen House, 2009.

Éilís Ní Dhuibhne was appointed Laureate for Irish Fiction by the Arts Council in July 2025 following an extensive selection process, succeeding Colm Tóibín. During her three year term, she continues to work as a creative artist. The Laureate engages in a number of public events each year, including an annual lecture.

== Awards ==
- 1985 Listowel Poetry Award
- Oireachtas Awards for a play and novels
- Butler Prose Award (American Association of Irish Studies)
- Bisto Merit Awards for The Hiring Fair and Hurlamaboc, and Bisto Book of the Year Award for Blaeberry Sunday
- 1986 Arts Council Bursaries
- 1998 Arts Council Bursaries
- 1997 BBC Irish Language Award
- 2000 Orange Prize for Fiction, shortlisted for The Dancers Dancing
- 2014 Hennessy Literature Award
- 2015 Irish PEN Award
- 2019 BBC Irish Language Award

== List of works ==
Novels in English

- The Bray House (1990)
- Singles (1994)
- The Dancers Dancing (1999)
- Fox, Swallow, Scarecrow (2007)
- Sister Caravaggio (2014)

Novels in Irish

- Dúnmharú sa Daingean (2001)
- Cailíní Beaga Ghleann na mBláth (2003)
- Hurlamaboc (2005)
- Dún an Airgid (2008)
- Dordán (2011)
- Aisling nó Iníon A (2015)

Collections

- Blood and Water (1988)
- Eating Women Is Not Recommended (1991)
- The Inland Ice (1997)
- The Pale Gold of Alaska (2000)
- Midwife to the Fairies (2003)
- The Shelter of Neighbours (2012)
- Little Red and Other Stories (2020)

Children's Books

- The Uncommon Cormorant (1990)
- Hugo and the Sunshine Girl (1991)
- The Hiring Fair (1992)
- Blaeberry Sunday (1993)
- Penny Farthing Sally (1996)
- The Sparkling Rain (2004)
- Snobs, Dogs and Scobies (2011)

Plays

- Dún na mBan Trí Thine
  Produced by Amharclann de hÍde and first performed at the Peacock, Dublin, 1995;
- Milseog an tSamhraidh
  Produced by Amharclann de hÍde and first performed at the Samuel Beckett Theatre, Trinity College, in 1996;
- The Nettle Shirts
  Produced by the Abbey and performed at the Peacock Theatre, Dublin, in 1998.

Memoirs

- Twelve Thousand Days: A Memoir of Love and Loss (2018)
