= Philip Ó Ceallaigh =

Irish short story writer and translator

- Born: 23 March 1968 (age 58)
- Education: Philosophy
- Alma mater: University College Dublin (UCD)
- Occupation: Writer
- Writing career
- Genre: Short Story
- Notable awards: Rooney Prize for Irish Literature; 2006

Philip Ó Ceallaigh (Irish: [oː ˈcal̪ˠəj]; born 23 March 1968) is an Irish short story writer and translator who lives in Bucharest.

Ó Ceallaigh won the 2006 Rooney Prize for Irish Literature and was shortlisted twice (2006 and 2009) for the Frank O'Connor International Short Story Award.

== Biography ==
Ó Ceallaigh has spent much of his adult life in Eastern Europe, starting in Russia in the early nineteen-nineties. Since 1995 he has lived mostly in Romania. He also lived for a while in the United States.

He graduated from University College Dublin (UCD) with a degree in philosophy.

After receiving his degree, Ó Ceallaigh travelled the world, doing a variety of jobs, including waiter, newspaper editor, freelance journalist and volunteer for clinical trials. He moved to Bucharest so that he could live cheaply and pursue his desire to write.

He speaks six languages.

He went to school with Sinéad O'Connor, who was in his class. He once told an interviewer: "She told me she wanted to become famous and I tried to talk her out of it".

== Work ==
He has published over 40 short stories, as well as essays and criticism. His work has appeared in Granta, the Irish Times and the Los Angeles Review of Books and has been translated into more than a dozen languages.

In 2010, he edited Sharp Sticks, Driven Nails, an anthology of new short stories by twenty-two Irish and international writers, for The Stinging Fly Press.

He translated Mihail Sebastian's autobiographical novel For Two Thousand Years. It tells the story of the author's early years as a Jew in Romania during the 1920s. It was published in 2016.

He has written an unpublished novel but reduced it to a long short story and believes "if you've got something to say and you can say it with less, that's the way to go."

The first story in his third collection, Trouble, involves a security guard and the theft of a sum of money from a gangster. Ó Ceallaigh used the time he spent as a security guard in Dublin to form the basis of this fiction.

== Style ==
Ó Ceallaigh eschews the prevailing style of Irish short story writing in that his works are rarely set in Ireland, and instead are set in a variety of locations across the world, predominantly in Romania. His stories generally feature solitary men, with women playing more incidental roles.

He has acknowledged being influenced in his writing style by Charles Bukowski, Anton Chekhov, Fyodor Dostoyevsky, Ernest Hemingway, Jack Kerouac, and Ivan Turgenev.

== Reception ==
Eve Patten, in The Irish Times, praised his "ambitiousness with the short story shape", and "his break from the grip of ingrained Irish modes".

Michel Faber, in The Guardian, described his control of tone, dialogue and narrative contour as "masterful".

== Awards and honours ==
Hennessy Award for his first published work in 1998.

Winner of the Rooney Prize for Irish Literature, for his collection Notes from a Turkish Whorehouse in 2006.

Notes from a Turkish Whorehouse won the 2006 Glen Dimplex New Writers' Award.

He was the first Irish writer to be shortlisted for the Frank O'Connor International Short Story Award (for Notes from a Turkish Whorehouse in 2006). His second collection, The Pleasant Light of Day, was also shortlisted for the 2009 award.

== Bibliography ==
=== Short Story Collections ===
- —— (2006). Notes from a Turkish Whorehouse. ISBN 9781844880751.
- —— (2009). The Pleasant Light of Day. ISBN 9781844881864.
- —— (2021). Trouble. ISBN 9781906539863.

=== As editor ===
- —— (2010). Sharp Sticks, Driven Nails. ISBN 9781906539153.

=== Translations ===
- Sebastian, Mihail (2016). Ó Ceallaigh, Philip (ed.). For Two Thousand Years. ISBN 9780241189610.
- Sebastian, Mihail (2020). Ó Ceallaigh, Philip (ed.). Women. ISBN 9780241442906.
