= List of Irish writers =

This is a list of writers either born in Ireland or holding Irish citizenship, who have a Wikipedia page. Writers whose work is in Irish are included.

== B–H ==
- John Banim (1798–1842)
- Ivy Bannister (born 1951)
- Sebastian Barry (born 1955)
- Colin Bateman (born 1962)
- Samuel Beckett (1906–1989)
- Brendan Behan (1923–1964)
- Maeve Binchy (1939–2012)
- George A. Birmingham (1865–1950)
- Dermot Bolger (born 1959)
- Angela Bolster (1925–2005)
- Dion Boucicault (1820–1890)
- Colm Byrne (born 1971)
- Úna-Minh Chaomhánach (born 1991)
- Marina Carr (born 1964)
- Austin Clarke (1896–1974)
- Padraic Colum (1881–1972)
- William Congreve (1670–1729)
- Michael Cormican (1948–2023)
- James Cousins (1873–1956)
- Anne Devlin (born 1951)
- Roddy Doyle (born 1958)
- Gary Duggan (born 1979)
- Lord Dunsany (1878–1957)
- John Ennis (born 1944)
- St John Ervine (1883–1971)
- Bernard Farrell (born 1941)
- Brian Friel (1929–2015)
- Fannie Gallaher (1854–1936)
- Evie Gaughan (born 1976)
- William Nugent Glascock (c. 1787–1847)
- Oliver Goldsmith (c. 1728–1774)
- Lady Augusta Gregory (1852–1932)
- Gerald Griffin (1803–1840)
- James Augustus Hicky (fl. 1780s)
- Declan Hughes (born 1963)

== J-O ==
- Benedict Kiely (1919–2007)
- Denis Johnston (1901–1984)
- Jennifer Johnston (1930–2025)
- Marie Jones (born 1951)
- James Joyce (1882–1941)
- Patrick Kavanagh (1904–1967)
- John B. Keane (1928–2002)
- Cathy Kelly (born 1966)
- Thomas Kilroy (born 1934)
- Jerome Kilty (1922–2012)
- Deirdre Kinahan (born 1968)
- Conor Kostick (born 1964)
- Hugh Leonard (1926–2009)
- C. S. Lewis (1898–1963)
- Micheál Mac Liammóir (1899–1978)
- Donagh MacDonagh (1912–1968)
- Walter Macken (1915–1967—see also "Novelists")
- Ian Macpherson (living)
- Aodhán Madden (1947–2015)
- Malsachanus (fl. 8–9 AD)
- Edward Martyn (1859–1923)
- John McCann (1905–1980)
- Martin McDonagh (born 1970)
- Hugh McFadden (born 1942)
- John McGahern (1934–2006)
- Frank McGuinness (born 1953)
- Christina McKenna (living)
- Conor McPherson (born 1971)
- M. J. Molloy (1914–1994)
- George Moore (1852–1933)
- Jimmy Murphy (living)
- John Murphy (1924–1998)
- Tom Murphy (1935–2018)
- T. C. Murray (1873–1959)
- Megan Nolan (born 1990)
- Flan O'Brien (1911–1966)
- Seán O'Casey (1880–1964)
- Philip Ó Ceallaigh (born 1968)
- Joseph O'Connor (living)
- Antoine Ó Flatharta (living)
- Mary Devenport O'Neill (1879–1967)
- John O'Keeffe (1747–1833)
- Mark O'Rowe (born 1970)
- Cathal Ó Searcaigh (born 1956)
- Robert Owenson (1744–1812)

== R–T ==
- Christina Reid (1942–2015)
- Lennox Robinson (1886–1958)
- Billy Roche (born 1949)
- Sally Rooney (born 1991)
- G. Bernard Shaw (1856–1950)
- Peter Sheridan (born 1952)
- Richard Brinsley Sheridan (1751–1816)
- George Shiels (1881–1949)
- Bram Stoker (1847–1912)
- John Millington Synge (1871–1909)
- Colin Teevan (born 1968)
- Colm Tóibín (born 1955)
- Joseph Tomelty (1911–1995)

== W and Y ==
- Mervyn Wall (1908–1997)
- Enda Walsh (born 1967)
- Oscar Wilde (1845–1900)
- Evie Woods (born 1976)
- W. B. Yeats (1865–1939)

== Non-fiction ==
=== Biography and memoirs ===
- Úna-Minh Caomhánach (Úna-Minh Kavanagh, born 1991), memoirist
- Bill Cullen (living) author, and businessman
- Emma Dabiri (living) author, academic, and broadcaster
- Edith Newman Devlin (1926–2012) author and academic
- Julia Kavanagh (1824–1877), biographer and social scientist
- Malachy McCourt (1931 - 2024), actor and politician
- Tomás Ó Criomhthain (1856–1937), memoirist
- Thomas O'Crohan (1856–1937), biographer (in the Irish language)
- Muiris Ó Súilleabháin (Maurice O'Sullivan, 1904–1950), memoirist

=== Gardening and natural history ===
- Eoghan Daltun (born 1967), rewilding advocate
- Helen Dillon (born 1940), gardener
- Diarmuid Gavin (born 1964), gardener
- Marcus Hartog (1851–1924), natural historian
- William Henry Harvey (1811–1866), natural historian
- Miles McMullan (born 1967), author of wildlife guide books
- Dermot O'Neill (1964 - 2022), gardener
- William Robinson (1838–1935), gardener

=== History ===
- Peter Brown (born 1935)
- Seathrún Céitinn (Geoffrey Keating, c. 1569 – c. 1644)
- Roy Foster (born 1949)
- Gerard Anthony Hayes-McCoy (1911–1975)
- Anthony Holten (1945–2020)
- Geoffrey Keating (Seathrún Céitinn, c. 1569 – c. 1644)
- James Kelly (born 1959)
- Thomas Leland (1722–1785)
- F. S. L. Lyons (1923–1983)
- John A. Murphy (born 1927)
- Richard Barry O'Brien (1847–1918), historian and journalist
- John Cornelius O'Callaghan (1805–1883)
- Colmán N. Ó Clabaigh, friar and historian
- Matthew Potter (living)
- Sharon Slater (living)
- James Ware (1594–1666)
- Cecil Woodham-Smith (1896–1977)

=== Journalism and broadcasting ===
- Brian Farrell (1929–2014), broadcaster
- Gene Kerrigan (living), journalist
- Robert Wilson Lynd (1879–1949), essayist
- Karen Frances McCarthy (living), journalist
- Norah Meade (1888–1954), journalist
- Fintan O'Toole (born 1958), journalist
- Cornelius Ryan (1920–1974), journalist and historian
- Richard Steele (1672–1729), journalist and politician
- Margaret E. Ward, journalist and broadcaster
- John Waters (born 1955), journalist

=== Literature and language ===
- Elizabeth Bowen (1899–1973), literary critic
- Mrs. E. M. Field (1856–1940), literary critic and education

=== Morality and ethics ===
- John Bale (1495–1563)
- Nicholas Bernard (1600–1661)
- Richard Paul Blakeney (1820–1884)
- Maxwell Henry Close (1822–1903)
- Frances Power Cobbe (1822–1904), writer on religious and social issues and fine arts
- John Duncan Craig (1830–1909)
- Edward Daly (1933–2016), bishop
- Eamon Duffy (born 1947)
- Desmond Fennell (1929–2021)
- C. S. Lewis (1898–1963)
- John Lynch (c. 1599 – c. 1677), religious writer and historian
- Catherine Mary MacSorley (1848–1929)
- Richard Baptist O'Brien (1809–1885)
- Fintan O'Toole (born 1958)
- William Thompson (1775–1833)
- James Ussher (1581–1656), bishop
- John Waters (born 1955)
- Richard Whately (1787–1863), religious writer and economist

=== Music ===
- Aloys Fleischmann (1910–1992)
- Tilly Fleischmann (1882–1967)

=== Philosophy ===
- George Berkeley (1685–1753)
- George Boole (1815–1864)
- Dermot Moran (living)
- Desmond Fennell (1929–2021)
- Richard Kearney (born 1954)
- John Moriarty (1938–2007)
- Brendan Sweetman (born 1962)
- William Thompson (1775–1833)

=== Politics ===
- Thomas Amory (c. 1691–1788)
- Roger Boyle, 1st Earl of Orrery (1621–1679)
- John Wilson Croker (1780–1857)
- Margracia Loudon (c.1788–1860)

=== Women's issues ===
- Maeve Kelly (1930–2025)
- Nell McCafferty (born 1944)
- William Thompson (1775–1833)

=== Miscellaneous ===
- Eugene Davis (1857–1897), travel writer, poet
- Edward MacLysaght (1887–1986), genealogist
- Dervla Murphy (1931–2022), travel writer
- George O'Brien (born 1945), academic
- John O'Hart (1824–1902), genealogist
- Seamus O'Mahony (born 1960), medical writer
- Brendan Simms (born 1967), politician
- Francis Stoughton Sullivan (1715–1766), lawyer
- Maev-Ann Wren (living), economist

=== A–C ===
- John Banim (1798–1842)
- Michael Banim (1796–1874)
- John Banville (born 1945)
- Leland Bardwell (born 1922)
- Kevin Barry (born 1969)
- Sebastian Barry (born 1955)
- Samuel Beckett (1906–1989)
- Brendan Behan (1923–1964)
- Gerard Beirne (born 1962)
- Maeve Binchy (1940–2012)
- George A. Birmingham (1865–1950)
- Dermot Bolger (born 1959)
- Elizabeth Bowen (1899–1973)
- John Boyne (born 1971)
- Maeve Brennan (1916–1993)
- John Broderick (1924–1989)
- Ken Bruen (born 1951)
- Lucy Caldwell (born 1981)
- Aifric Campbell (born before 1976)
- William Carleton (1794–1869)
- Joyce Cary (1888–1957)
- Jane Casey (born 1977)
- Austin Clarke (1896–1974)
- Brian Cleeve (1921–2003)
- Eoin Colfer (born 1965)
- Padraic Colum (1881–1972)
- Evelyn Conlon (born 1952)
- Colm Connolly (born 1942)
- June Considine (born before 1959)

=== D–J ===
- Seamus Deane (1940–2021)
- Frank Delaney (1942–2017)
- Brian Oswald Donn-Byrne (1889–1928)
- Emma Donoghue (born 1969)
- Gerard Donovan (born 1959)
- Roddy Doyle (born 1958)
- Catherine Dunne (born 1954)
- Lord Dunsany (1878–1957)
- Maria Edgeworth (1767–1849
- Anne Enright (born 1962)
- J. G. Farrell (1935–1979)
- Anne Marie Forrest (born 1967)
- Oliver Goldsmith (1728–1774)
- Gerald Griffin (1803–1840)
- Hugo Hamilton (born 1953)
- Dermot Healy (born 1947)
- Aidan Higgins (1927–2015)
- Desmond Hogan (born 1950)
- Arlene Hunt (born 1972)
- Jennifer Johnston (born 1930)
- Neil Jordan (born 1950)
- James Joyce (1882–1941)

=== K–R ===
- John B. Keane (1928–2002)
- Molly Keane (1904–1996, writing as M.J. Farrell)
- Cathy Kelly (born 1966)
- Louise Kennedy (born 1967)
- Marian Keyes (born 1963)
- Charles Kickham (1828–1882)
- David M. Kiely (born 1949)
- Celine Kiernan (born 1967)
- Conor Kostick (born 1964)
- Derek Landy (born 1974)
- Charles Lever (1806–1872)
- C. S. Lewis (1899–1963)
- Morgan Llywelyn (born 1937)
- Rosina Bulwer Lytton (1802–1882)
- Walter Macken (1915–1967—see also "Dramatists")
- Brinsley MacNamara (1890–1963, real name John Weldon, see The Valley of the Squinting Windows)
- Ian Macpherson (living)
- Deirdre Madden (born 1960)
- David Marcus (1924–2009)
- Charles Robert Maturin (1782–1824)
- Colum McCann (born 1965)
- Barry McCrea (born 1974)
- Frank McCourt (1930–2009)
- John McGahern (1934–2006)
- Christina McKenna (born 1957)
- Anna McPartlin (born 1972)
- Brian Moore (1921–1999)
- George Moore (1852–1933)
- Lady Morgan (Sidney Owenson, c. 1776–1859)
- Danny Morrison (born 1953)
- Iris Murdoch (1919–1999)
- James Murphy (1839–1921)
- Éilís Ní Dhuibhne (born 1954)
- Edna O'Brien (1930–2024)
- Máirtín Ó Cadhain (1906–1970)
- Billy O'Callaghan (born 1974)
- Philip Ó Ceallaigh (born 1968)
- Joseph O'Connor (born 1963)
- Mary O'Donnell (born 1954)
- Peadar O'Donnell (1893–1986)
- Liam O'Flaherty (1896–1984)
- Valentine O'Hara (1875–1941)
- Jamie O'Neill (born 1962)
- Louise O'Neill (born 1985)
- Brian O'Nolan (1912–1966, writing as Flann O'Brien and Myles na gCopaleen)
- Glenn Patterson (born 1961)
- James Plunkett (1920–2003)
- Katherine Purdon (1852–1920)
- Keith Ridgway (born 1965)
- Frank Ronan (born 1963)
- Sally Rooney (born 1991)

=== S–Z ===
- John W. Sexton (born 1958)
- Darren Shan (born 1972)
- Somerville and Ross (Edith Somerville, 1858–1949, and Violet Florence Martin, 1862–1915)
- Laurence Sterne (1713–1768)
- Bram Stoker (1847–1912)
- Francis Stuart (1902–2000)
- Jonathan Swift (1667–1745)
- Kate Thompson (born 1959)
- Colm Tóibín (born 1955)
- Robert Tressell (1870–1911)
- William Trevor (1928–2016)
- Ethel Lilian Voynich (1864–1960)
- William Wall (born 1955)
- Maurice Walsh (1879–1964)
- Leonard Wibberley (1915–1983)
- Oscar Wilde (1854–1900)
- Niall Williams (born 1958)

== Poets ==
=== A–D ===
- Adomnán (c. 624 – 704)
- Æ: George William Russell (1867–1935)
- William Allingham (1824–1889)
- Leland Bardwell (1922–2016)
- Eaton Stannard Barrett (1786–1820)
- Richard Barrett (1740–1818)
- Beccán mac Luigdech (fl. c. 650)
- Samuel Beckett (1906–1989)
- Brendan Behan (1923–1964)
- Gerard Beirne (born 1962)
- Eavan Boland (1944–2020)
- Dermot Bolger (born 1959)
- Pat Boran (born 1963)
- Blathmac mac Con Brettan (fl. c. 750)
- Frances Browne (1816–1887)
- Ciarán Carson (1948–2019)
- Patrick Chapman (born 1968)
- Austin Clarke (1896–1974)
- Brendan Cleary (born 1958)
- Brian Coffey (1905–1995)
- Colmán mac Lénéni (530–606)
- Padraic Colum (1881–1972)
- James Cousins (1873–1956)
- Cuirithir of Connacht (fl. 7th century)
- John Cunningham (1729–1773)
- Dallán Forgaill (c. 560 – 640)
- Thomas Davis (1814–1845)
- Cecil Day-Lewis (1904–1972)
- John F. Deane (born 1943)
- Denis Devlin (1908–1959)
- John Dillon (1816–1866)
- Gerard Donovan (born 1959)
- Charles Donnelly (1914–1937)
- William Drennan (died 1820)
- Charles Gavan Duffy (1816–1903)
- Seán Dunne (1956–1995)
- Lord Dunsany (1878–1957)
- Paul Durcan (born 1944)

=== E–L ===
- Flann Mainistreach (died 1056)
- Patrick Galvin (1927–2011)
- Monk Gibbon (1896–1987)
- Oliver St. John Gogarty (1878–1957)
- Oliver Goldsmith (c. 1730–1774)
- Sarah Maria Griffin (c1988)
- Stephen Gwynn (1864–1950)
- Michael Hartnett (1944–1999)
- Randolph Healy (born 1956)
- Seamus Heaney (1939–2013)
- F. R. Higgins (1896–1941)
- Pearse Hutchinson (1927–2012)
- Douglas Hyde (1860–1949)
- Valentin Iremonger (1918–1991)
- John Jordan (1930–1988)
- James Joyce (1882–1941)
- Trevor Joyce (born 1947)
- Patrick Kavanagh (1904–1967)
- Thomas Kinsella (1928–2021)
- Charles Kickham (died 1882)
- Anatoly Kudryavitsky (born 1954)
- Emily Lawless (1845–1913)
- Francis Ledwidge (1887–1917)
- C. S. Lewis (1899–1963)
- James Liddy (1934–2008)
- Ruth Frances Long (born 1971)
- Michael Longley (born 1939)
- Luccreth moccu Chiara (fl. c. 580)
- Brian Lynch (born 1945)

=== M–P ===
- Denis Florence MacCarthy (1817–1868)
- Donagh MacDonagh (1912–1968)
- Thomas MacDonagh (1878–1916)
- Patrick MacDonogh (1902–1961)
- Seán Mac Falls (born 1957)
- Patrick MacGill (1889–1960)
- Thomas MacGreevy (1893–1967)
- Louis MacNeice (1907–1963)
- Derek Mahon (1941–2020)
- James Clarence Mangan (1803–1849)
- Hugh McFadden (born 1942)
- Nigel McLoughlin (born 1968)
- Brian Merriman (1747–1805)
- Máire Mhac an tSaoi (born 1922)
- Alice Milligan (1865–1953)
- John Montague (1929–2016)
- Thomas Moore (1779–1852)
- Paul Muldoon (born 1951)
- Gerry Murphy (born 1952)
- Eiléan Ní Chuilleanáin (born 1942)
- Nuala Ní Dhomhnaill (born 1952)
- Nuala Ní Chonchúir (born 1970)
- Dáibhí Ó Bruadair (David O Bruadair, 1625–1698)
- Lughaidh Ó Cléirigh (c. 1580 – c. 1640)
- Máirtín Ó Direáin (1910–1988)
- Mary O'Donnell (born 1954)
- Dennis O'Driscoll (1954–2012)
- Seán Mór Ó Dubhagáin (died 1372)
- Oengus Celi De (fl. c. 800)
- Cinaed Ó hArtucain (died 975)
- Mary Devenport O'Neill (1879–1967)
- Antoine Ó Raifteirí (Anthony Raftery, 1784–1835)
- Aogán Ó Rathaille (1675–1729)
- John Boyle O'Reilly (1844–1890)
- Seán Ó Ríordáin (1916–1977)
- Frank Ormsby (born 1947)
- Cathal Ó Searcaigh (born 1956)
- Seumas O'Sullivan (1879–1958)
- Eoghan Ó Tuairisc (Eugene Watters, 1919–1982)
- Tom Paulin (born 1949)
- Patrick Pearse (1879–1916)
- Joseph Plunkett (1887–1916)

=== Q–Z ===
- George Reavey (1907–1976)
- Lennox Robinson (1886–1958)
- Gabriel Rosenstock (1949–2026)
- Adam Rudden (born 1983)
- Blanaid Salkeld (1880–1959)
- Maurice Scully (born 1952)
- John W. Sexton (born 1958)
- Eileen Shanahan (1901–1979)
- James Simmons (1933–2001)
- Michael Smith (1942–2014)
- Sydney Bernard Smith (1936–2008)
- Geoffrey Squires (born 1942)
- James Stephens (1880–1950)
- Jonathan Swift (1667–1745)
- Senchán Torpéist (fl. c. 580 – c. 650)
- Katharine Tynan (1861–1931)
- William Wall (born 1955)
- Catherine Walsh (born 1964)
- Jane Wilde (1821–1896)
- Oscar Wilde (1845–1900)
- James Wills (1790–1868)
- Macdara Woods (1942–2018)
- Frances Wynne (1863–1893)
- W. B. Yeats (1865–1939)
- Augustus Young (born 1943)

== Short story writers ==
=== A–H ===
- Robert William Alexander (1905–1979)
- Ivy Bannister (born 1951)
- Samuel Beckett (1906–1989)
- Gerard Beirne (born 1962)
- Blindboy Boatclub (born 1985/6)
- Elizabeth Bowen (1899–1973)
- Clare Boylan (1948–2006)
- Patrick Boyle (1905–1982)
- John Boyne (born 1971)
- Maeve Brennan (1917–1993)
- William Carleton (1794–1849)
- Joyce Cary (1888–1957)
- Patrick Chapman (born 1968)
- Padraic Colum (1881–1972)
- Evelyn Conlon (born 1952)
- Daniel Corkery (1878–1964)
- Anne Devlin (born 1951)
- Lord Dunsany (1878–1957)
- Maria Edgeworth (1767–1849)
- Brian Friel (1929–2015)
- Frank Gallagher (1893–1962)
- Gerald Griffin (1803–1840)
- Aidan Higgins (1927–2015)
- Desmond Hogan (born 1951)

=== J–M ===
- John Jordan (1930–1988)
- Neil Jordan (born 1950)
- James Joyce (1882–1941)
- Claire Keegan (born 1969)
- Maeve Kelly (born 1930)
- Benedict Kiely (1919–2007)
- David M. Kiely (born 1949)
- Mary Lavin (1912–1996)
- Sheridan Le Fanu (1814–1873)
- Edmund Leamy (1848–1904)
- Walter Macken (1915–1967)
- John MacKenna (born 1952)
- Bernard MacLaverty (born 1942)
- Michael McLaverty (1907–1992)
- Bryan MacMahon (1909–1998)
- Ian Macpherson (born 1951)
- Violet Florence Martin (1862–1923) of Somerville and Ross partnership
- Aidan Mathews (born 1956)
- Eugene McCabe (1930–2020)
- John McGahern (1934–2006)
- Christina McKenna (born 1957)
- John Montague (1929–2016)
- George A. Moore (1852–1933)
- Val Mulkerns (1925–2018)

=== O-P ===
- Edna O'Brien (born 1932)
- Kate Cruise O'Brien (born 1948)
- Máirtín Ó Cadhain (1906–1970)
- Billy O'Callaghan (born 1974)
- Feardorcha Ó Conaill (1876–1929)
- Pádraic Ó Conaire (1882–1928)
- Frank O'Connor (1903–1966)
- Mary O'Donnell (born 1954)
- Julia O'Faolain (1933–2020)
- Seán Ó Faoláin (1900–1990)
- Liam O'Flaherty (1896–1984)
- Seumas O'Kelly (1881–1918)
- James Plunkett (1920–2003)
- Victor O'Donovan Power (1860–1933)

=== R–T ===
- Lennox Robinson (1886–1958)
- Peig Sayers (1873–1958), story teller
- John W. Sexton (born 1958)
- Somerville and Ross (1858–1949) and (1862–1915)
- James Stephens (1882–1950)
- Laurence Sterne (1713–1768)
- Colm Tóibín (born 1955)
- William Trevor (1928–2016)

=== W ===
- William Wall (born 1955)

== Children's and young adult literature writers ==
- Sarah Bowie
- Niall Breslin
- Eoin Colfer
- Marita Conlon-McKenna
- Sarah Crossan
- Judi Curtin
- Oein DeBhairduin
- Aoife Dooley
- Patricia Forde
- Sarah Maria Griffin
- Paul Howard
- Oliver Jeffers
- Derek Landy
- PJ Lynch
- Dara McAnulty
- Oisín McGann
- Sinéad Moriarty
- David O'Doherty
- Siobhán Parkinson
- Niamh Sharkey
- Deirdre Sullivan

== See also ==
- Irish literature
- List of Irish historians
- List of Irish women writers
- List of writers from Northern Ireland
