= SurVision =

International surrealist poetry magazine and small press

SurVision is an international English-language surrealist poetry project, comprising an online magazine and a book-publishing outlet. SurVision magazine, founded in March 2017 by poet Anatoly Kudryavitsky, was a platform for surrealist poetry from Ireland and the world. SurVision Books, the book imprint, started up the following year.

== SurVision Magazine ==
SurVision
- Editor: Anatoly Kudryavitsky and Tony Kitt
- Categories: Literature
- Frequency: biannual
- Founder: Anatoly Kudryavitsky
- Founded: 2017
- Country: Ireland
- Based in: Dublin
- Language: English
- Website: www.survisionmagazine.com

SurVision published a biannual magazine of the same name, containing surrealist poetry, including translations from other languages. The magazine has been noted for the range of its contributors, who have included both established and new writers from Ireland and other parts of the world. The Dublin Review of Books has called it "currently the only international magazine devoted exclusively to surrealist poetry."

The Munich-based German-language Signaturen Magazine announced that they will be publishing German translations of the best poems from SurVision. In an interview with Signaturen, Anatoly Kudryavitsky described the magazine's editorial policy:

At SurVision, we appreciate rich language and honed poetic skills. We have a soft spot for poetic experiments, but we believe that such an experiment has to be successful in order to beget publishable texts. The reader will probably notice that we prefer poems that create distinct visual images to abstract Surrealist poems.

In 2018, John W. Sexton's poem "The Snails" which appeared in SurVision magazine was shortlisted for An Post's Irish Poem of the Year.

In July 2024, the editors announced on their website that "after eight successful years and the publication of 15 issues, the editors of SurVision felt that the magazine had come to a natural end of its time as a poetry periodical. However, the SurVision website will continue to display all the materials published from January 2017 until July 2024. SurVision will go on as a book-publishing outlet."

== The James Tate International Poetry Prize ==
Since 2018, SurVision has awarded the annual James Tate International Poetry prize for the most favoured collection of surrealist poems. Most of the times, the prize was shared between two or more poets. The prize was named in honour of the writer and poet James Tate.

Year	Winners of 1st Prize		
2018	Christopher Prewitt	Anton Yakovlev	
2019	John Thomas Allen	John Bradley	
2020	Alan Elyshevitz	Henry Finch	
2021	Charles Borkhuis	Stuart Ross	
2022	Noah Falck and Matt McBride	Michael Zeferino Spring	
2023	Don Berger	Robert Miltner	Jeffrey Cyphers Wright
2024	Mark Blaeuer	Michael Handler Ruby	
2025	Elisabeth Murawski		
2026	Antony Di Nardo	Anthony Seidman	

== SurVision Books ==
SurVision started publishing books in April 2018. The first two titles in the New Poetics series were 34-page chapbooks by Noelle Kocot and the Irish surrealist poet Ciaran O'Driscoll. More books followed, including a chapbook by the US Surrealist poet Elin O'Hara Slavick, two full-size collections by the US Surrealist poet George Kalamaras, and Selected Poems by the German poet Anton G. Leitner; in 2019, chapbooks by English experimental poet Helen Ivory and Irish poets John W. Sexton, Afric McGlinchey, Tony Kitt, and Tim Murphy; and in 2020, chapbooks by Irish poets Matthew Geden and Tony Bailie. Anthologies of contemporary Surrealist poetry from Ireland and Russia were also published in 2020, followed by an anthology of Ukrainian poetry about the war edited by Tony Kitt and published in April 2022. In May 2022, SurVision announced on their website that Tony Kitt joined their editorial team.

In his detailed review in Poetry Ireland Trumpet of three collections of work by Irish poets, Michael S. Begnal has written that "SurVision is a press that brings energy and excitement to Irish poetry."

According to a MEAS report containing a statistical analysis of Irish poetry publications, SurVision Books was the joint-second most prolific poetry press on the island of Ireland in 2018.

== Notable contributors ==
- Adam Aitken
- Peter Boyle
- Patrick Chapman
- Patrick Deeley
- Alison Dunhill
- Janet Hamill
- Philip Hammial
- Helen Ivory
- George Kalamaras
- Noelle Kocot
- Medbh McGuckian
- Mary O'Donnell
- Ciaran O'Driscoll
- John Olson
- Dilys Rose
- Stuart Ross
- John W. Sexton
- G. C. Waldrep
- Les Wicks
- Jeffrey Cyphers Wright
- Dean Young

== Publications ==
=== Collections of poetry ===
- George Kalamaras, That Moment of Wept ISBN 978-1-9995903-7-6, and Through the Silk-Heavy Rains ISBN 978-1-912963-28-7
- Anton G. Leitner, Selected Poems 1981-2015. Translated from German. ISBN 978-1-9995903-8-3

=== Anthologies ===
- Seeds of Gravity: An Anthology of Contemporary Surrealist Poetry from Ireland, ed. by Anatoly Kudryavitsky (2020) ISBN 978-1-912963-18-8
- MESSAGE-DOOR: An Anthology of Contemporary Surrealist Poetry from Russia, ed. by Anatoly Kudryavitsky, bilingual English/Russian (2020) ISBN 978-1-912963-17-1
- Invasion: Ukrainian Poems about the War, ed. by Tony Kitt (2022) ISBN 978-1-912963-32-4
- Contemporary Tangential Surrealist Poetry: An Anthology, ed. by Tony Kitt (2023) ISBN 978-1-912963-44-7

=== Chapbook series (highlights) ===
- Noelle Kocot, Humanity. ISBN 978-1-9995903-0-7
- Ciaran O'Driscoll, The Speaking Trees. ISBN 978-1-9995903-1-4
- Elin O'Hara Slavick, Cameramouth. ISBN 978-1-9995903-4-5
- Helen Ivory, Maps of the Abandoned City. ISBN 978-1-912963-04-1
- John W. Sexton, Inverted Night. ISBN 978-1-912963-05-8
- Alison Dunhill, As Pure as Coal Dust. ISBN 978-1-912963-23-2
