= Hugh McFadden =

Hugh McFadden may refer to:

- Hugh McFadden (poet), Irish poet and journalist
- Hugh McFadden (Gaelic footballer), Irish Gaelic footballer

== See also ==
- Hugh McFadyen, lawyer and politician in Manitoba, Canada
