= Aodhán Madden =

Irish writer, playwright and screenwriter

- Born: Aodhán Madden; 1947; Dublin, Ireland
- Died: 2015 (aged 67–68)
- Occupations: Playwright, screenwriter, short story writer
- Writing career
- Notable work: Remember Mauritania (1987)

Aodhán Madden (1947–2015) was an Irish playwright, screenwriter, poet and short story writer.

== Life ==
Aodhán Madden was born in Dublin in 1947. He initially worked as a journalist and critic with the Irish Press. He then began writing full-time for stage, radio and screen. His plays were staged at the Abbey Theatre and the Peacock Theatre and broadcast on RTÉ and the BBC. Madden also wrote the acclaimed film Night Train, which starred John Hurt and Brenda Blethyn. He taught in the Media Department in Coláiste Dhúlaigh College of Further Education in Coolock in his later life for several years.

He died in 2015.

== Works ==
=== Stage plays ===
- The Midnight Door (1983)
- The Dosshouse Waltz (1985)
- Sensations (1986)
- Private Death of a Queen (1986)
- Sea Urchins (1988)
- Remember Mauritania (1987)
- Josephine in the Night (1988)
- Candlemas Night (1991).

=== Radio plays ===
- Remember Mauritania (RTÉ, 1985)
- Obituaries (RTÉ, 1992)

=== Screenplay ===
- Night Train (1998)

=== Short stories ===
- Mad Angels of Paxenau Street (1991)

=== Poetry ===
- Demons (1978)

=== Memoir ===
- Fear and Loathing in Dublin (2009). Dublin: Liberties Press.

== Awards ==
- Member, Aosdána
- 1984: O.Z. Whitehead award for drama - for Remember Mauritania
- 1985: O.Z. Whitehead award for drama - for Private Death of a Queen
- 1985: Herald Tribune Award for Best Play in the Dublin Theatre Festival - for Dosshouse Waltz
- 1998: screenplay Night Train (1998), directed by John Lynch, won the best actor award for Sir John Hurt at the Verona Film Festival in 1999 and was nominated as best European feature at the Brussels Film Festival.
- Francis MacManus Award

== See also ==
- List of Irish writers
