= Anthony Bailey =

Anthony Bailey may refer to:

- Anthony Bailey (author) (1933–2020), British writer and art historian
- Tony Bailey (born 1946), English footballer, see List of Oldham Athletic A.F.C. players (25–99 appearances)
- Anthony Bailey (PR advisor) (born 1970), British public relations consultant

== See also ==
- Tony Bailie (born 1964), novelist and journalist
