= Helen Ivory =

English poet, artist, tutor and editor

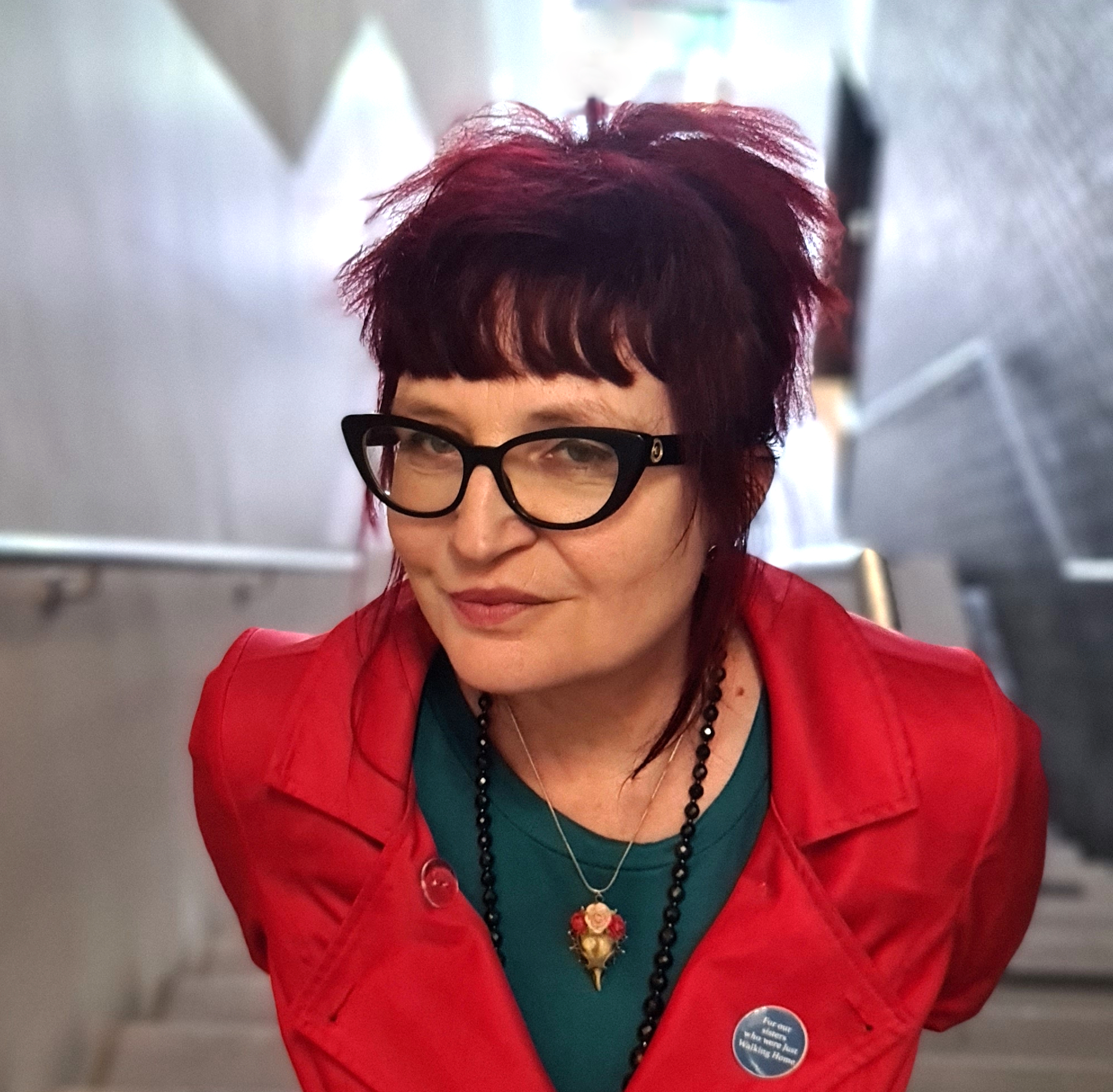

Helen Ivory (born 1969) is an English poet, artist, tutor, and editor.

== Career ==
Ivory is a poet and visual artist. Her sixth Bloodaxe Books collection is Constructing a Witch (2024), a Poetry Book Society Winter Recommendation.

In 2024 she was awarded a Cholmondeley Award. Co-judge Moniza Alvi says of her work: "Helen Ivory, a highly individualistic poet and visual artist, conjures a world that is both magical and sharply real."

Ivory edits the webzine Ink Sweat and Tears and teaches online for National Centre for Writing In 2020 she became a Versopolis poet and has work translated into Ukrainian, Polish, Spanish, Croatian and Greek. In 2019, she was named as one of the EDP's 100 Most Inspiring Women.

Fool’s World, a collaborative Tarot with the artist Tom de Freston (Gatehouse Press), won the 2016 Saboteur Best Collaborative Work award. A collection of collage/mixed-media poems entitled Hear What the Moon Told Me was published in 2016 by Knives Forks and Spoons Press.

In early 2019, SurVison published a chapbook of predominantly surrealist poems titled Maps of the Abandoned City. Reviewing it in London Grip magazine, Rosie Jackson noted "the rare skill Ivory has to make her surrealism float into a world where politics – particularly sexual politics – are still pertinent." The Square of the Clockmaker from this chapbook, was chosen as one of the Poems on the Underground in 2023.

== Awards ==
In 1999, Ivory won an Eric Gregory Award from the Society of Authors.

In 2024 she received a Cholmondeley Award from the Society of Authors.

== Personal life ==
Ivory was born in Luton but has lived in Norwich since 1990. She is married to the poet and photographer Martin Figura.

== Works ==
=== Poetry collections ===
- The Double Life of Clocks (Bloodaxe Books, 2002)
- The Dog in the Sky (Bloodaxe Books, 2006)
- The Breakfast Machine (Bloodaxe Books, 2010)
- Waiting for Bluebeard (Bloodaxe Books, 2013)
- Hear What the Moon Told Me(Knives Forks and Spoons Press, 2015)
- Maps of the Abandoned City (SurVision Press) (2019)
- The Anatomical Venus (Bloodaxe Books, 2019)
- Wunderkammer: New and Selected Poems (MadHat Press, US, 2023) https://madhat-press.com/pages/helen-ivory
- Constructing a Witch (Bloodaxe Books, 2024)

=== Collaborations ===
- Fool's World, with Tom de Freston (Gatehouse Press, 2015)

=== As editor ===
- In Their Own Words: Contemporary Poets on Their Poetry, co-edited with George Szirtes (Salt Publishing, 2012)
- "Ten Poems from Norfolk", co-edited with Martin Figura (Candlestick Press, 2025)
