= Lapwing Publications =

Specialist publisher based in Belfast, Northern Ireland

Lapwing Publications is a publisher based in Belfast and specialising in poetry.

== History ==
The press was founded in 1988 by Dennis and Rene Greig. Since then it has published over a hundred and fifty poetry collections. Lapwing Publications publishes in a variety of formats: pamphlets, chapbooks, and soft back books. Lapwing Publications sells some of their pamphlets in E-Book format and plans to eventually have the entire back catalogue in electronic form.

Lapwing mainly publishes poets from Ireland, both north and south of the border. It has also published poets from other parts of Europe, as well as Canada and the US.

According to MEAS report providing statistics for Irish poetry publications, Lapwing Publications in 2018 was the joint-second most prolific poetry press on the Island of Ireland.

== Notable poets published by the press ==
- Tony Bailie
- Patrick Chapman
- Fred Johnston
- Hugh McFadden
- Padraic Fiacc
- Robert Greacen
- Jean O'Brien
- Desmond O'Grady
- Adam Rudden
- James Simmons
- Todd Swift
