= Helen Lamb =

Scottish poet (1956–2017)

- Born: 1956
- Died: 27 March 2017 (aged 60–61)
- Partner: Chris Powici
- Writing career
- Genres: Poetry, Short stories, Fiction
- Notable awards: Scotland on Sunday Women 2000 Prize

Helen Lamb (1956–27 March 2017) was an award-winning Scottish poet and short story writer who also worked with the cancer caring Maggie's Centres in the Forth Valley promoting the role of writing in well-being.

== Personal life ==
Lamb was a writer, educator, mother and grandmother who lived in Dunblane with Chris Powici, who is also a poet, former editor of literary magazine Northwords and a teaching fellow at the University of Stirling.

== Career ==
Her poetry has been published in literary journals and in the joint anthology Strange Fish along with fellow poet Magi Gibson. She also published a short story collection entitled Superior Bedsits and many of her stories were broadcast on radio. Her work has been featured in other general anthologies and she was one of the writers included in Working Words: Scottish creative writing, which was designed to promote creative writing in schools. Her poem "Spell of the Bridge" was one of those reproduced on a postcard for National Poetry Day in 2007. Lamb worked at the University of Edinburgh and the University of Stirling as a Royal Literary Fund Fellow, tutoring in creative writing. As well as working with cancer charity Maggie's Centres, Lamb also worked with adult survivors of childhood abuse, editing anthologies of their writings. She died suddenly in 2017 shortly after finishing her first novel Three Kinds of Kissing, described by fellow author Tracey Emerson as "a subtly devastating wonder".

== Awards ==
Lamb won the Scotland on Sunday/Women 2000 prize for her story "Long Grass, Moon City".

== Publications ==
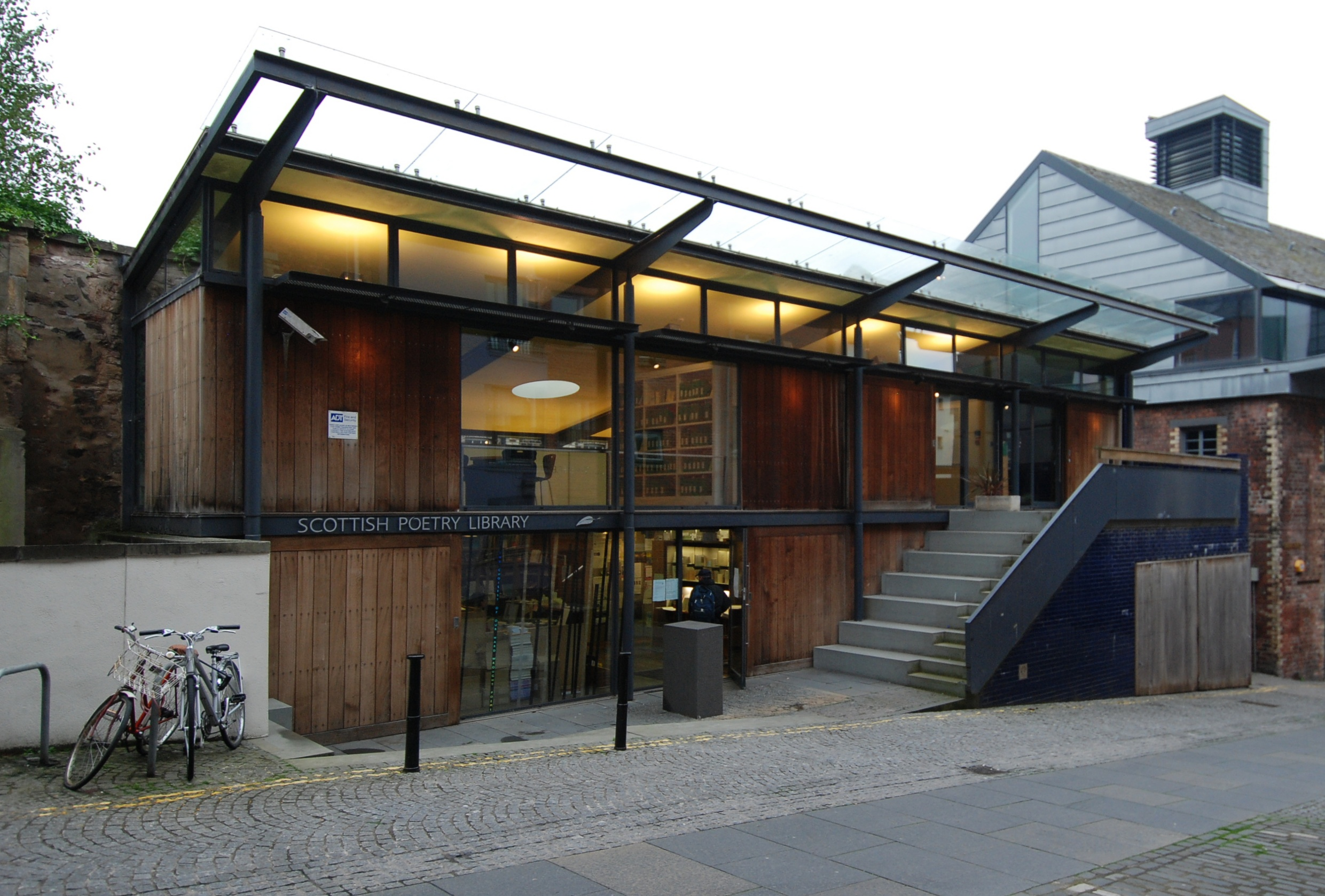
Examples of Helen Lamb's poetry can be found in the Scottish Poetry Library and on their website: https://www.scottishpoetrylibrary.org.uk/website.

=== Works ===
- Strange Fish (1997), with Magi Gibson
- Superior Bedsits : and other stories (Polygon 2001)
- Three Kinds of Kissing (2018)

=== Anthologies ===
- Original prints : New writing from Scottish women. Vol. 4. (1992)
- Working words / Valerie Thornton. (1995)
- Different boundaries / edited by Barbara Weightman and Elsie MacRae. (1995)
- Last things first / edited by A.L. Kennedy and James McGonigal. (1995)
- After the Watergaw : a collection of new poetry from Scotland inspired by water / edited by Robert Davidson. (1998)
- Friends and kangaroos / edited by Moira Burgess and Donny O'Rourke. (1999)
- Across the water : Irishness in modern Scottish writing / edited by James McGonigal, Donny O'Rourke & Hamish Whyte. (2000)
- Going up Ben Nevis in a bubble car / edited by Moira Burgess and Janet Paisley. (2001)
- Milking the haggis / edited by Valerie Thornton and Hamish Whyte. (2004)
- The Edinburgh book of twentieth-century Scottish poetry / edited by Maurice Lindsay and Lesley Duncan. (2005)
- The thing that mattered most : Scottish poems for children / edited by Julie Johnstone. (2006)
- The dynamics of balsa / edited by Liz Niven and Brian Whittingham. (2007)
- Bucket of frogs / edited by Liz Niven and Brian Whittingham. (2008)
- Songs of other places / edited by Gerry Cambridge and Zoë Strachan. (2014)
