= Earl McCarthy =

Irish swimmer

Personal information
- Full name: Earl McCarthy
- Nationality: Ireland
- Born: 8 February 1969 (age 57)

Sport
- Sport: Swimming
- Strokes: Freestyle

Earl McCarthy (born 8 February 1969) is a retired male freestyle swimmer from Ireland. He competed for his native country at the 1996 Summer Olympics in Atlanta, Georgia in the 100m and 200m freestyle. Earl was the Women In Sport Manager for Swim Ireland in 2008. He is a former Irish Olympian in swimming (Atlanta 1996), previous Irish record holder and National Irish Champion in the 100m & 200m freestyle events. In 2003 he became the oldest male winner of a national title, winning the Men's 100m freestyle. In addition, Earl has over ten years of coaching experience both in Germany and in Ireland. Earl holds a First Class Honour Degree in Sports Management from University College Dublin and a postgraduate diploma in Law from King's Inn. Earl's hometown is Dublin, where he currently resides.

In 2012, McCarthy was an analyst on the 2012 Olympics swimming coverage on RTÉ Sport.

His sister is Irish author Karen Frances McCarthy.
