= Janice Fitzpatrick Simmons =

American poet

Janice Fitzpatrick Simmons (born 1954) is an American-Irish poet.

After moving to Ireland in 1987, the Boston-born writer co-founded The Poets' House with her husband and fellow poet James Simmons in 1990.

== Early life and education ==
Janice Fitzpatrick was born in Boston in 1954, and grew up in Wellesley, Massachusetts, and Barrington, Rhode Island.

She graduated with a master's degree from the University of New Hampshire in the late 1980s.

== Career ==
After working at The Frost Place in New Hampshire, she moved to Ireland in 1987 to pursue a doctorate at University College Dublin. There, in 1990, she founded alongside her husband James Simmons The Poets' House, first in Islandmagee in County Antrim, and later in Falcarragh in County Donegal.

Her first solo poetry collection, the chapbook Leaving America, was published in 1992, followed by her first full-length collection, Settler, in 1995. She went on to publish five collections in total, including 2005's The Bowsprit. Her most recent collection, Saint Michael in Peril of the Sea, was published in 2009.

Fitzpatrick Simmons' work has appeared in various anthologies including A Rage for Order, The Backyards of Heaven, The Blackbird's Nest, Salmon: A Journey in Poetry 1981-2007, Female Lines, and Irish American Poets since 1800.

== Personal life ==
Fitzpatrick's move to Ireland came after her first marriage ended in divorce. She then was married to fellow poet James Simmons, with whom she has one son, until his death in 2001. They had met when he visited the United States on a literary exchange program. Her later work frequently reflects her experience of her husband's illness and death, as well as her efforts to uphold his legacy.

== Selected works ==
- Leaving America (chapbook, 1992)
- Settler (1995)
- Starting at Purgatory (1999)
- The Bowsprit (2005)
- Saint Michael in Peril of the Sea (2009)
