= Noelle Kocot =

American poet

- Born: Brooklyn, New York
- Occupation: Poet
- Notable work: God's Green Earth; Phantom Pains of Madness; May*Soul in Space; The Bigger World; Sunny Wednesday

Noelle Kocot (born 1969), legal name Noelle Kocot-Tomblin, is an American poet. They are the author of nine collections of poetry, including Ascent of the Mothers (Wave Books, 2023),God's Green Earth (Wave Books, 2020), Phantom Pains of Madness (Wave Books, 2016), Soul in Space (Wave Books, 2013), The Bigger World (Wave Books, 2011) Sunny Wednesday (Wave Books, 2009), Poem for the End of Time and Other Poems (Wave Books, 2006), The Raving Fortune (Four Way Books, 2004) and 4 (Four Way Books, 2001)

== Career ==
Kocot teaches part time at The New School in the creative writing program, and has also taught at the New Writers Project in Austin, Texas. They are a graduate of Oberlin College.

== Personal life ==
Kocot was born and raised in Brooklyn, New York, and now resides in New Jersey, where they are the poet laureate of Pemberton Borough.

Kocot was hospitalized in 2000 at Bellevue Hospital, where she was diagnosed with bipolar disorder. She was married to the composer Damon Tomblin, whose death of a drug overdose in 2004 inspired her collection Sunny Wednesday.

== Writing and awards ==
The New York Times, reviewing their 2006 book Poem for the End of Time and Other Poems, noted that "these poems are saturated with despair, but cling to a grim, even masochistic hopefulness," and called the title poem "extraordinary" She has also published Poet By Default (Wave Books, 2011), a limited-edition collection of translations of the poems of Tristan Corbière. Kocot has received numerous honors for her poetry, including a NEA fellowship, A Fund for Poetry grant (2001), the S.J. Marks Memorial Award from The American Poetry Review, the Greenwall Prize from the Academy of American Poets (2001) a Lannan Fellowship (2014). Their work has been included in many anthologies, such as The Best American Poetry anthologies for 2001, 2012 and 2013 and the 2013 edition of Postmodern American Poetry: A Norton Anthology. Reviewing their 2007 collection in Jacket Magazine, critic Craig Johnson noted her broad brushstrokes and a large intoxicated surrealistic vision." Matthew Paul, reviewing her 2018 chapbook, stressed the visual aspects of their surrealistic approach to writing: they "can cast an intriguingly surreal spell through compelling imagery. Their work has been written about in several books, including, Suddenness and the Composition of Poetic Thought by Paul Magee (Rowman and Littlefield; London and New York, 2022). Kocot's poetry is being displayed from April, 2024 – April 2025 in J. Hood Wright Park in Manhattan, sponsored by The Poetry Society of America and The NY Parks Department, a poem on NYC-NJ Transit and a poem on a wall in Downtown Brooklyn. Kocot's poetry has been widely anthologized and is published in over 30 countries. Kocot's poetry has been placed in orbit around Mars via the spacecraft MAVEN.

== Bibliography ==
- Ascent of the Mothers (Wave Books, 2023)
- Under Gemini (Five Hundred Places Press, 2020), chapbook, 2 volumes (Berlin)
- God's Green Earth (Wave Books, 2020)
- Humanity (SurVision Books, 2018) – chapbook, 34 pages (Ireland)
- Sonnets- (Clinic Publishing, 2017) – chapbook, 28 pages (UK)
- Phantom Pains of Madness (Wave Books, May 2016)
- Soul in Space (Wave Books, October 2013)
- Poet By Default (translations of Tristan Corbière) (Wave Books, 2011)
- The Bigger World (Wave Books, 2011)
- Damon's Room (a bibliographic pamphlet) (Wave Books, 2010)
- Sunny Wednesday (Wave Books, 2009)
- Poem for the End of Time and Other Poems (Wave Books, 2006)
- The Raving Fortune (Four Way Books, 2004)
- 4 (Four Way Books, 2001)

== Reviews ==
https://www.6sqft.com/poetry-pops-up-in-five-new-york-city-parks/ https://harpers.org/archive/2024/01/flowers-noelle-kocot-ascent-of-the-mothers/ https://blog.bestamericanpoetry.com/the_best_american_poetry/ https://www.publishersweekly.com/9781950268870

- EcoTheo Review https://www.ecotheo.org/grace-and-ongoingness-noelle-kocots-path-among-the-forms/—
- The White Review https://www.thewhitereview.org/reviews/noelle-kocots-gods-green-earth/
- https://www.poetryfoundation.org/articles/153642/after-the-hard-living—Justin Taylor's article with The Poetry Foundation
- https://www.publishersweekly.com/9781950268023 Starred review in Publishers Weekly of God's Green Earth
- Review of The Bigger World in The Rumpus
- Review of The Bigger World at Coldfront
- Publishers Weekly reviews Sunny Wednesday
- The New York Times reviews Poem for the End of Time
