= Molly McCloskey =

American writer (born 1964)

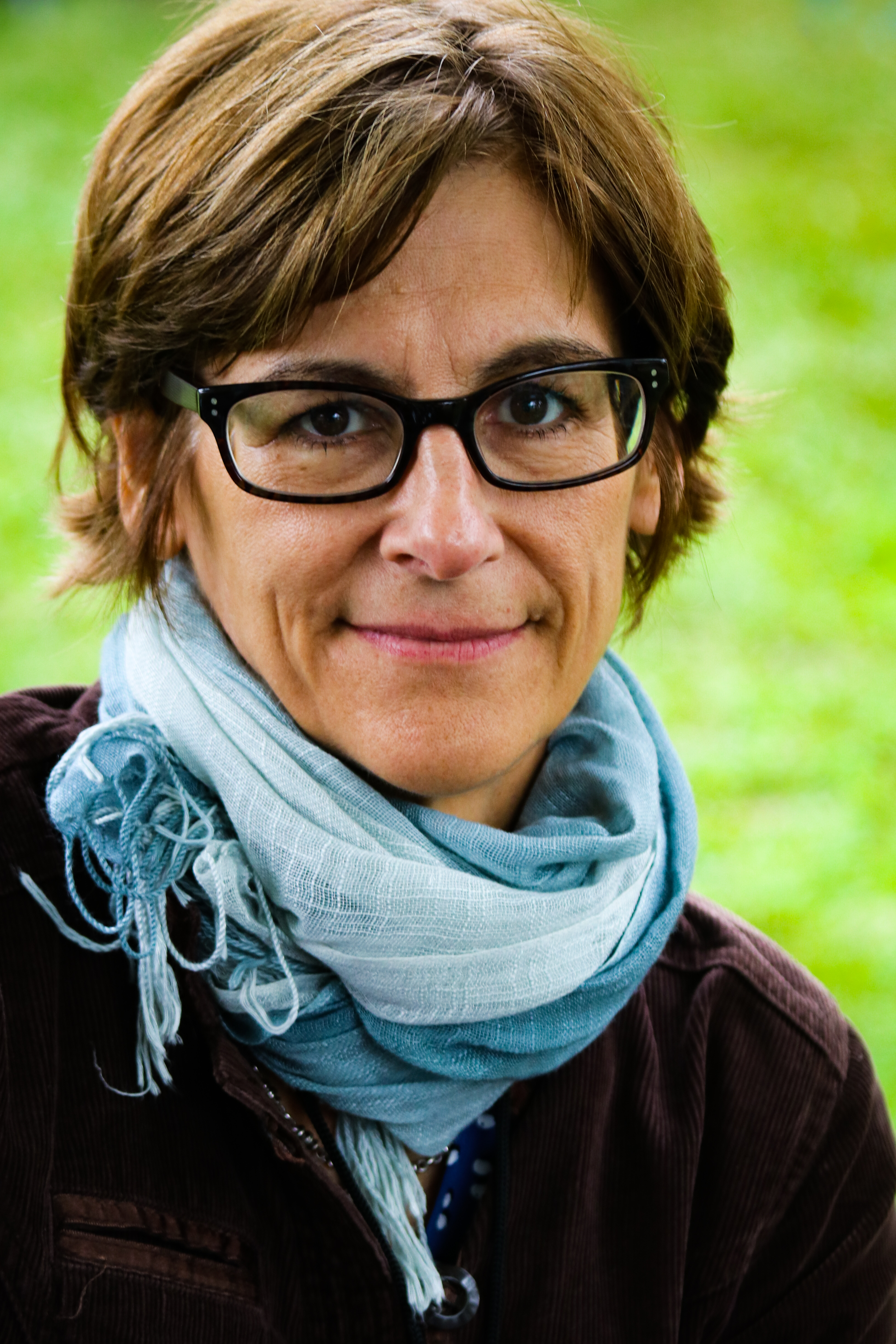
- Born: 1964 (age 61–62); Philadelphia, Pennsylvania, U.S.
- Education: Saint Joseph's University (BA); University College Dublin (MPhil); Boston University (MFA)
- Relatives: Jack McCloskey (father)
- Writing career
- Notable awards: Francis MacManus Award
- Website: Official website

Molly McCloskey (born 1964 in Philadelphia, Pennsylvania) is an American writer who lived in Ireland for many years. Her fiction has won the RTÉ Francis MacManus Award (1995) and the inaugural Fish Short Story Prize (1996). Her story "Another Country" was anthologized in The Faber Book of Best New Irish Short Stories (2005), edited by David Marcus. In 2009, another of her short stories, "This Isn’t Heaven," was selected by Richard Ford as one of the prize-winning stories in the 2009 Davy Byrne’s Irish Writing Award and was anthologized in Davy Byrne’s Stories. Her first work of non-fiction, a memoir of her schizophrenic brother Mike, called Circles Around the Sun: In Search of a Lost Brother, was named by The Sunday Times (UK) as its Memoir of the Year for 2011.

== Life ==
McCloskey, a daughter of well-known basketball coach Jack McCloskey, spent her early childhood in North Carolina, where her father coached the Wake Forest Demon Deacons. Later, after her father was made head coach of the Portland Trail Blazers in 1972, the family moved to Oregon. McCloskey was educated in Saint Joseph's University, Philadelphia, which she attended on a sports scholarship.

In 1989, she moved to Ireland where she married and settled in Sligo. While living in Sligo, she played basketball with the Sligo All-Stars team. In 1998, after a brief return to Philadelphia, she moved to Dublin and completed a Master of Philosophy Degree at University College Dublin. She has an MFA from Boston University.

She has written for a number of publications, including The Guardian, The Irish Times, the Los Angeles Review of Books, and The Dublin Review. In the 2009–2010 academic year, she was the Writer Fellow at Trinity College, Dublin, where she taught on the M. Phil. course in creative writing.

She has worked in the UN’s Kenya-based office coordinating international aid to Somalia. She has also lived in Kosovo. She now lives in Washington, D.C.

== Works ==
In 1992, she published her first story in Dermot Healy’s literary journal, Force 10. She published her first book of short stories, Solomon’s Seal, in 1997. Protection, her debut novel, set in contemporary Ireland, appeared in 2006.

Her memoir, Circles Around the Sun, was published in 2011 to favorable reviews, including one by Man Booker Prize-winning novelist, Anne Enright, who wrote in The Guardian: "Every once in a while, a writer's voice hits such a clear note, the resulting book has the kind of sweetness that makes you hold it in your hands a moment before finding a place for it on your shelves. Circles Around the Sun is this kind of book: it's a keeper. A memoir of a schizophrenic brother, written with great care and simplicity, it is one of those stories that waited until its writer was ready to tell it."

In 2017, she published the novel Straying (titled When Light is Like Water in the UK) to favorable reviews; The Guardian called it "ferociously well written." It was shortlisted for the Irish Book Awards.

== Bibliography ==
- Solomon’s Seal, Phoenix House, 1997, ISBN 9781861590220
- The Beautiful Changes, Lilliput, 2002, ISBN 9781901866810
- Protection, Penguin Books Limited, 2006, ISBN 9780141941738
- Circles Around the Sun: In Search of a Lost Brother. Overlook. 27 September 2012. ISBN 978-1-4683-0391-9.
- Straying, Scribner, 2018, ISBN 978-1501172465.
- When Light Is Like Water, Penguin, 2018, ISBN 978-1844883882.
