= Brendan Sweetman =

Irish philosopher (born 1962)

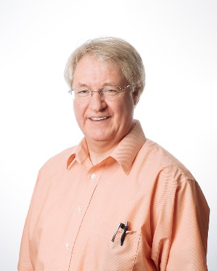
Brendan Sweetman

Brendan Sweetman (born 1962) is an Irish philosopher whose research interests are in philosophy of religion, contemporary European philosophy, political philosophy, business ethics, and the Catholic Intellectual Tradition. He is a specialist on the work of French philosopher, Gabriel Marcel. He holds the Sullivan Chair of Philosophy and is Professor of Philosophy at Rockhurst University, Kansas City, Missouri, USA.

== Early life ==
Sweetman grew up in Lusk, Co. Dublin, the son of Sean and Anna Sweetman. After attending primary school in Lusk, Sweetman completed the Irish Leaving Certificate at Colaiste Choilm Christian Brothers Secondary School, in Swords, County Dublin. He graduated from University College, Dublin with a bachelor's degree (1983) and a master's degree (1986) in Philosophy, both with first class honors. He obtained his PhD in philosophy at the University of Southern California, Los Angeles.

== Academic work ==
In addition to the thought of Gabriel Marcel and Martin Buber, Sweetman has published widely on the topics of religion and science, religion and politics, and the rationality of religious belief. In 2017, he was elected a Fellow of the International Society for Science and Religion (Cambridge, UK). He is President of the Gabriel Marcel Society and the Editor of Marcel Studies. His books have been translated into Italian, Spanish and Portuguese.

== Publications ==
In addition to over one hundred articles in journals, reference works and collections, Sweetman has written or edited numerous books, including;

Is Theistic Evolution Viable?: A Reflection on Evolution and Christian Theism (Cascade, 2026)

The Crisis of Democratic Pluralism: The Loss of Confidence in Reason and the Clash of Worldviews (Palgrave Macmillan, 2021)

Evolution, Chance and God: Understanding the Relationship between Evolution and Religion (Bloomsbury, 2015)

Religion and Science: An Introduction (Continuum, 2010)

The Vision of Gabriel Marcel: Epistemology, Human Person, The Transcendent (Brill, 2008)

Religion: Key Concepts in Philosophy (Continuum, 2007)

Why Politics Needs Religion: The Place of Religious Arguments in the Public Square (InterVarsity, 2006)

Philosophical Thinking and the Religious Context: Essays in Honor of Santiago Sia. Editor. Bloomsbury, 2013)

A Gabriel Marcel Reader (St. Augustine's Press, 2011)

Faith and the Life of the Intellect. Co-editor, with Curtis L. Hancock (Catholic University of America Press, 2003)

Contemporary Perspectives on Religious Epistemology Co-editor, with R.D. Geivett. (Oxford University Press, 1992)

== See also ==
- List of Irish writers
