= David M. Kiely =

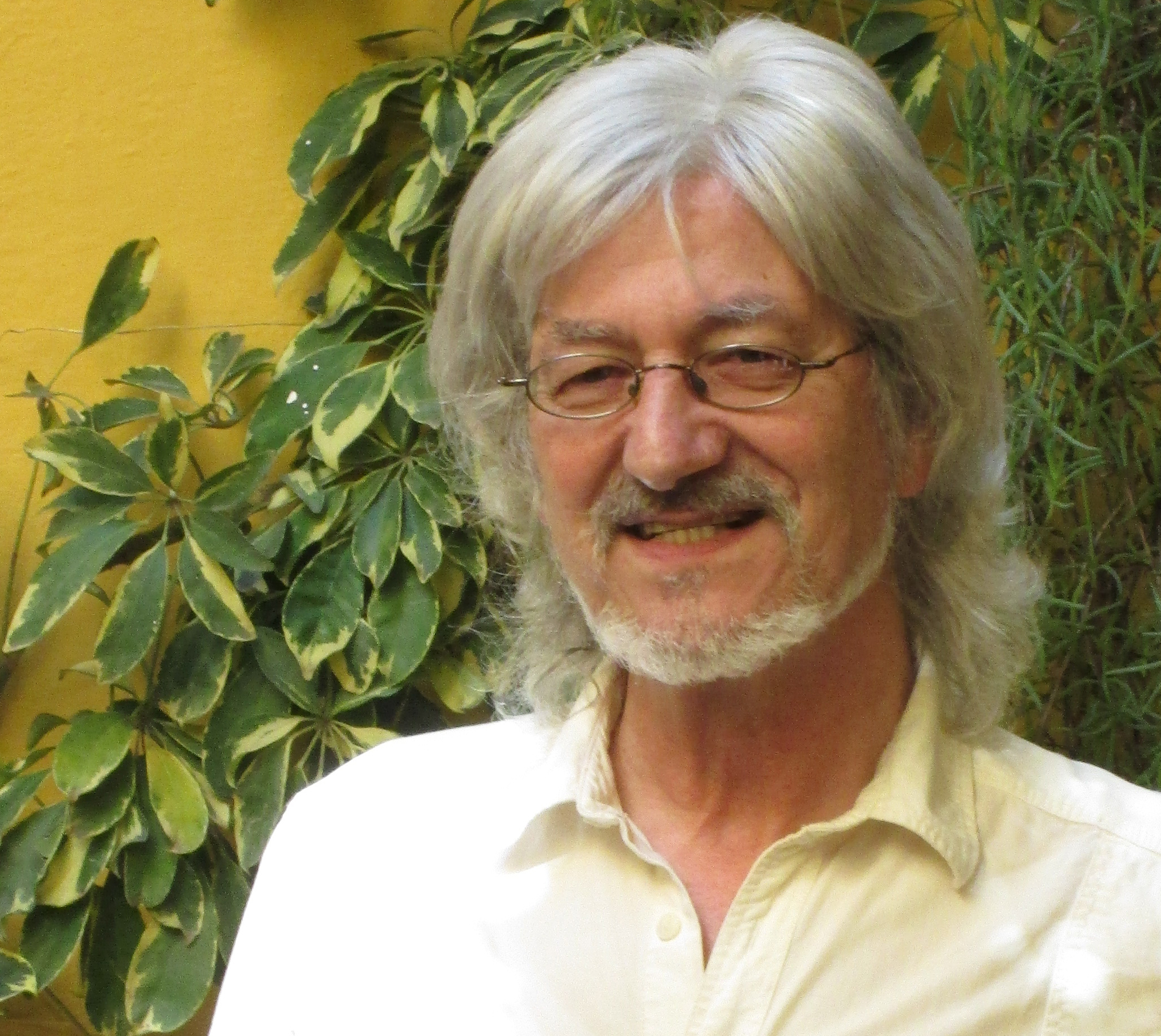
David M. Kiely, Irish author

David M. Kiely (born 10 July 1949, Dublin) is a writer of fiction and non-fiction. Having worked in advertising in several countries, he returned to Ireland in 1991, to take up writing full-time. His first book was published in 1994. He currently lives in Newry, County Down, Northern Ireland, with his wife and co-author Christina McKenna.

== Publications ==
- John Millington Synge: A Biography was intended for the non-academic reader. It was published in 1994 by Gill & Macmillan, Dublin, and St. Martin's Press, New York.
- A Night in the Catacombs (1995 Lilliput Press, Dublin) is a book of short stories that presents fictional portraits of Irish literati, ranging from Jonathan Swift to Brendan Behan. It was exceptionally well received by critic and public alike ("An ingenious, inventive, and innovative fictional voyage." - The Irish Times).
- Modern Irish Lives (1996 Gill & Macmillan, Dublin, and St. Martin's, New York) is an encyclopedia of men and women who influenced Irish life in the twentieth century. David contributed more than five hundred articles to the book.
- The Angel Tapes (1997 St. Martin's, New York, and Blackstaff Press, Belfast) is a crime thriller set in Dublin. It features the hunt for an unknown bomber who is targeting the forthcoming visit to the country of the President of the United States.
- Bloody Women: Ireland's Female Killers (1998 Gill & Macmillan, Dublin) contains 17 cases of Irishwomen who were found guilty of murder or manslaughter. The cases range from that of Victorian murderer Kate Webster to that of Susan Christie, who fatally stabbed her love rival in 1993.
- Deadlier Than the Male: Ireland's Female Killers (2005 Gill & Macmillan, Dublin) is a sequel to Bloody Women and spans roughly the same period, i.e. from Victorian times to the present day.
- The Dark Sacrament: Exorcism in Modern Ireland (2006 Gill & Macmillan, Dublin,) co-authored with Christina McKenna, contains nine contemporary cases of exorcism. A special American edition was published in October 2007 by HarperOne, San Francisco. It contains additional material. A paperback edition was issued in 2008.
- More Bloody Women: Ireland's Most Dangerous Females (2009 Poolbeg Press, Co. Dublin) is the third in this series of true-crime books. Unlike its predecessors, this book concentrates on more recent killings, from the case of Majella Boland, who hired a hitman to murder her husband in 1989, to the tragedy of Mary Prendergast of Cork, who was convinced her daughter was the Devil and stabbed her to death in 2006. Readers will recognize high-profile women such as Catherine Nevin, Sharon Collins, and the Mulhall Sisters. But there are also lesser-known cases that will both appal and fascinate.
- The Ghost of '98 (2015 Parsifal Press, Newry) is one of the few novels written in the second-person singular. Northern Ireland is seen in 1998 through the eyes of a young New Yorker who works in the fashion industry. She's mourning the cot-death of her baby boy. Her name is Joy McCracken and she plans suicide.
- The Faustian Gambit (2015 Parsifal Press, Newry) combines the paranormal with the invention of the printing press. The twin storylines alternate between present-day Ireland and mainland Europe in the fifteenth century. It's an unorthodox reworking of the legend of Faust.
- Usher's Island (2015 Parsifal Press, Newry) begins in County Clare in 1846 as the Famine rages. The protagonist must flee to America with his young niece, where they embark on many adventures. They return to Ireland some years later. A mysterious horseman makes his appearance at crucial moments, lending a paranormal aspect to the tale.
- Eyeless in Cooley (2015 Parsifal Press, Newry) is a sequel to The Angel Tapes. DI Blade Macken is called upon to solve a ghastly murder close to the border with Northern Ireland. His ensuing investigation uncovers a plot that extends back to wartime Europe.
- Baron Livingstone and the King of Manhattan (2015 Parsifal Press, Newry) is a novel for both young adults and mature readers. It imagines what might have happened had Leif Erikson the Viking decided to remain in America, and create Vinland. It deals with a parallel universe explored by young thespians from latter-day New York.
- The Epic of Mesopotamia (2015 Parsifal Press, Newry) is a novel that recounts the ill-fated British campaign of 1915. The story is told through the eyes of an army captain who was charged with filming the action. He suffered imprisonment at the hands of the Turks, and was witness to the genocide of the Armenian and Assyrian people, as well as the suffering of British POWs forced to lay the Berlin-Baghdad railway. The novel follows him to Paris in 1922, where he meets James Joyce and an American journalist, Blanche Fiore.
