= George Kalamaras =

American poet and educator

George Kalamaras is an American poet and educator. He is Professor of English at Purdue University, Fort Wayne, Indiana, where he has taught since 1990. He has published nineteen collections of poetry, twelve of which are full-length, including Kingdom of Throat-Stuck Luck, the winner of the Elixir Press Poetry Prize (2011), and The Theory and Function of Mangoes (2000), the winner of the Four Way Books Intro Series. His poetry has been described, as Surrealist.

== Personal life ==
Kalamaras was born in Chicago and grew up in Cedar Lake, Indiana. He graduated from Indiana University Bloomington in 1980. He earned a master's in English from Colorado State University and a PhD in English from University at Albany, SUNY.

Between 2014 and 2016 Kalamaras was poet laureate of the American state of Indiana.

== Bibliography ==
=== Poetry ===
- The Theory and Function of Mangoes (Four Way Books, 2000)
- Borders My Bent Toward (Pavement Saw Press, 2003)
- Even the Java Sparrows Call Your Hair (Quale Press 2004)
- Gold Carp Jack Fruit Mirrors (The Bitter Oleander Press, 2008)
- The Recumbent Galaxy, co-author Alvaro Cardona-Hine (C&R Press, 2010)
- Kingdom of Throat-stuck Luck (Elixir Press, 2011)
- The Hermit's Way of Being Human (CW Books, 2015)
- That Moment of Wept (SurVision Books, 2018) ISBN 978-1-9995903-7-6
- Luminous in the Owl’s Rib (Dos Madres Press, 2019) ISBN 978-1-948017-61-9
- We Slept the Animal: Letters from the American West (Dos Madres Press 2021) ISBN 978-1-953252-08-1
- Marsupial Mouth Movements (Cervena Barva Press, 2021) ISBN 978-1-950063-30-7
- Through the Silk-Heavy Rains (SurVision Books, 2021) ISBN 978-1-912963-28-7

=== Poetry chapbooks ===
- Heart Without End (Leaping Mountain Press, 1986)
- Beneath the Breath (Titlton House Press, 1988)
- The Scathering Sound (Anchorite Press, 2009)
- Something Beautiful Is Always Wearing the Trees (with paintings by Alvaro Cardona-Hine) (Stockport Flats Press 2009)
- Mingus Mingus Mingus (pamphlet) (Longhouse 2010)
- Symposium on the Body's Left Side (Shivastan Press 2011)
- The Mining Camps of the Mouth (New Michigan Press 2012)

=== Prose ===
- Reclaiming the Tacit Dimension: Symbolic Form in the Rhetoric of Silence (SUNY Press 1994)

=== Anthologies ===
- Visiting Authors, 2006 / Syracuse YMCA Poetry (The Downtown Writer's Center 2006)
- Mapping The Muse: A Bicentennial Look at Indiana Poetry (Brick Street Poetry Incorporated 2015)
