= Magi Gibson =

Scottish poet and children's author

- Born: 1953 (age 72–73); Kilsyth, Stirlingshire, Scotland
- Education: Glasgow University
- Occupations: Poet and children's author
- Spouse: Ian Macpherson
- Writing career
- Notable works: Graffiti in Red Lipstick, Wild Women of a Certain Age, Strange Fish, Kicking Back, Washing Hugh MacDiarmid's Socks
- Notable awards: Scotland on Sunday/Women 2000 Writing Prize, Stirling Open Poetry prize
- Website: www.magigibson.co.uk

Magi Gibson (1953) is a Scottish poet and children's author.

== Early life and education ==
Gibson was born in Kilsyth, Stirlingshire, in 1953. She studied French and German Literature at the University of Glasgow.

== Career ==
In 2000, Gibson won the Scotland on Sunday/Women 2000 Writing Prize, with her sequence The Senile Dimension, and has also won the Stirling Open Poetry prize. In 2007, she was the Writer in Residence at Glasgow's Gallery of Modern Art. From 2009 to 2012, Gibson held the position of Makar for the City of Stirling, the first person to hold the title in 500 years. She was a Reader in Residence at Glasgow Women's Library, has been the recipient of three Scottish Arts Council Creative Writing Fellowships, and a Royal Literary Fund Fellowship.

Gibson has also published a series of children's novels, Seriously Sassy.

== Personal life ==
Gibson lives in Glasgow and is married to comedy novelist Ian Macpherson.

== Works ==
=== Poetry collections ===
- Kicking Back (Taranis Books, 1993); ISBN 978-1873899656
- Strange Fish (with Helen Lamb) (Duende Poetry, 1997); ISBN 978-1900537032
- Wild Women of a Certain Age (Chapman Publishing, 2000); ISBN 978-0906772959
- Graffiti in Red Lipstick (Curly Snake, 2003); ISBN 978-1902141039
- Washing Hugh MacDiarmid's Socks (Luath Press, 2017) ISBN 978-1910745861
- I like Your Hat (Luath Press, 2020); ISBN 978-1913025731

=== Poetry pamphlets ===
- Premier Results (with Brian Whittingham)
- Death of a Wife

=== Plays ===
- One Foot in the Cuckoo's Nest (with Ian Macpherson) BBC Radio 4, 2006
- Our Boys, 2016

=== Children's Books ===
- Seriously Sassy (Puffin, 2009); ISBN 978-0141324647
- Seriously Sassy, Pinch me, I'm Dreaming (Puffin, 2009); ISBN 978-0141324654
- Seriously Sassy, Crazy Days, Puffin (Puffin, 2010); ISBN 978-0141324661
