= Alison Dunhill =

English artist and art historian

- Born: 1950 (age 75–76); London, England
- Education: University of Reading
- Occupations: Artist; art historian; poet
- Years active: 1972–present

Alison Dunhill (born 1950) is an English artist and art historian, and also a published poet.

== Biography ==
Born in London, Dunhill trained in Fine Art at the University of Reading under Sir Terry Frost and Rita Donagh. In the early 1970s she had a studio in Florence where she associated with some of the key figures in the Situationist International, including philosopher and filmmaker Guy Debord, the writer Gianfranco Sanguinetti and, later, the novelist and critic Michèle Bernstein. She presented some of her recollections of that time to an audience in Rio de Janeiro in 2015.

=== Artistic career ===
Dunhill is primarily a landscape painter and has also explored more abstract and semi-sculptural forms, including mixed media artworks inspired by the surrealist ideas of chance and the found object.

For much of her artistic career Dunhill maintained studios in London but she now lives and works in King's Lynn, Norfolk. She has exhibited frequently; she is a Member of the National Society of Painters, Sculptors & Printmakers; and she was a founder member of the Kingsgate Workshops Trust.

One of her drawings selected from the Women Artists Slide Library was reproduced in The Women Artists Diary 1989. Three of her paintings, and a discussion of the techniques she used to create them from her own original photographs, were reproduced in Diana Constance's book on painting from photographs published in 1995.

In 2015 she was awarded a residency at Largo das Artes (now Despina), a contemporary art institute in Rio de Janeiro, Brazil.

For a solo show in London in 2019 she created a range of textured collages and three-dimensional constructions using recycled materials and found objects; and the same year created hanging "clouds" of Wondermesh as site-specific installations with cusp at the Undercroft Gallery in Norwich.

In her 2021 'Lockdown Landscape' exhibition, Dunhill presented some 20 new canvases of varying sizes, painted in acrylics without brushes, as her response to the changed and changing world of the COVID-19 lockdown. Her account of the effect of the lockdown on her art practice is published in Now This: Reflections on Our Arts and Cultures.

A further new collection of landscape paintings was exhibited at the Crypt Gallery, Norwich, in Dunhill's 2025 'Contemporary Landscapes' show. Land- and riverscapes of Norfolk, among them the artist's response to the rewilding of Walton Wood, were contrasted with work inspired by the dramatic land of New Mexico and the Rockies.

==== Selected exhibitions ====
- 1984 - Kingsgate Gallery, London
- 1990 - Piers Feetham Gallery, London
- 1992 - Hampstead Theatre Gallery, London
- 1994 - Piers Feetham Gallery, London
- 1995 - Hampstead Theatre Gallery, London
- 1998 - Incomes Data Services, London
- 2003 - 'Segments', Gallery 47, London
- 2007 - Neptune Gallery, Hunstanton
- 2012 - 'Tall & Thin', Greyfriars Art Space, King's Lynn
- 2013 - '47 New Works', Flow Films, London
- 2015 - Largo das Artes, Rio de Janeiro
- 2018 - 'Plaster, Parquet & Pillars', Fermoy Gallery, King's Lynn
- 2019 - 'Upscape', A/side-B/side Gallery, London
- 2021 - 'Lockdown Landscape', Fermoy Gallery, King's Lynn
- 2023 - 'Landscapes', Brick Lane Gallery, London
- 2025 - 'Contemporary Landscapes', Crypt Gallery, Norwich

(Selected from exhibition list on artist's website)

=== Art historian ===
As an art historian, Dunhill completed an MPhil dissertation at the University of Essex on the modernist American photographer Francesca Woodman. This thesis provides a detailed analysis of six photographic artist's books that Woodman compiled in her lifetime, and examines them in the context of surrealism which, Dunhill argues, was a significant influence on Woodman. Her study of Woodman's book Some Disordered Interior Geometries was published in re•bus in 2008. Dunhill has presented papers on Woodman at academic conferences and gallery talks at the Douglas Hyde Gallery at Trinity College Dublin and the Sainsbury Centre for Visual Arts.

She contributed a memoir to a 2010 Paris exhibition catalogue of the artist and psychogeographer, and sometime Situationist, Ralph Rumney, whom she had befriended in the latter years of his life; and her published reviews include an assessment of Claudia Herstatt's Women Gallerists for Tate Etc. She also reviewed Anna Anderson's Childhood Rituals exhibition at the Freud Museum in Hampstead in 2011 for Cassone: The International Online Magazine of Art and Art Books.

Following the publication in 2023 of a fine, complete facsimile edition of all Woodman's artist's books, Dunhill has made her thesis publicly available as an electronic book.

=== Poetry ===
Dunhill's early poetry collection, Gig Soup Scoop, published in 1972 by a small alternative press, is now a rarity. She was an Arvon Foundation mentee in 1991, leading to publication in Joe Soap's Canoe.

Two of her prose poems were long-listed for the Fish Publishing Flash Fiction Prize 2020. Also in that year two of her poems were published in the international online surrealist poetry SurVision Magazine. Two further poems of hers were included in the Fenland Poetry Journal; the cover art of this issue reproduces one of Dunhill's artworks.

Her poetry pamphlet As Pure as Coal Dust, a winner of the James Tate International Poetry Prize, was published by SurVision Books in June 2021. Her poems have appeared in two recent international anthologies; and in the online literary magazine Propel.

More recently, she has published several poems in response to Francesca Woodman's photographic images. Another of these was shortlisted for the 2025 Wells Festival of Literature Open Poetry Competition.
