= Lorraine Francis =

Irish children's writer

- Born: 5 November 1958 (age 67)
- Occupation: Children's writer

Lorraine Francis (born 5 November 1958) is an Irish children's writer.

== Biography ==
Born Lorraine Francis in Athlone, Ireland on 5 November 1958, Francis has worked as a librarian for a number of years after completing a year of art college and taking time out for travel. She began writing for children in 1999 and most recently has been working with illustrator Pieter Gaudesaboos. He is an artist while Francis has been runner up in the Francis MacManus Award. She was published in an anthology edited by Hugh Leonard and Clare Boylan. Her children's books have been used in education in both Ireland and the United States.

== Bibliography ==
- Réveille toi, Walter!, 2019
- Een huis vol vrienden, 2019
- Word wakker Walter, 2016
- Uyan Walter, 2017
- Sammy and the Skyscraper Sandwich, 2013
- Het Boek van Mannetje Koek, 2009
- The great trolley race, 2003
- Pandora's Lunch Box, 2002
- The Origami Bird, 2001
- Save Our Sweet Shop, 2000
- Lulu's Tutu, 1999
