= Trader Jack =

Trader Jack may refer to:

- Jack McCloskey (1925–2017), American basketball executive
- Jack McKeon (born 1930), American baseball manager and executive
