= Úna-Minh Kavanagh =

Irish travel writer, journalist, and social media manager

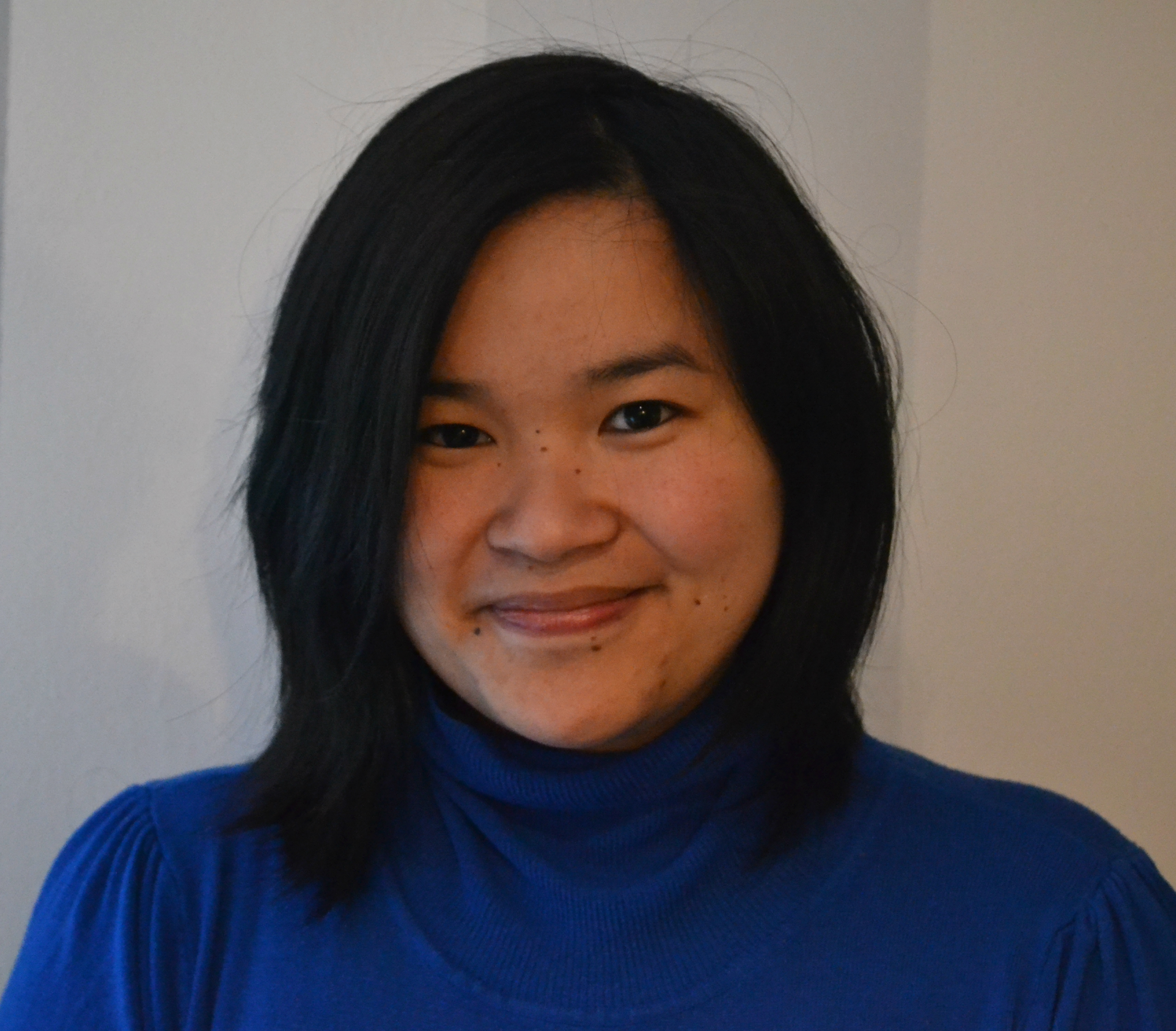
- Born: Hanoi, Vietnam
- Education: Dublin City University
- Occupations: Writer, journalist and game developer
- Known for: #FrásaanLae (#Phrase of the day) and #WeAreIrish
- Notable work: ANSEO
- Website: https://unaminhkavanagh.com/

Úna-Minh Kavanagh (Irish: Úna-Minh Chaomhánach; born 4 July 1991) is an Irish travel writer, journalist, and video game producer.

== Biography ==
Born in Hanoi, Vietnam on 4 July 1991, Úna-Minh Kavanagh was adopted at three days old by Noreen Kavanagh, a primary school teacher from Tralee, County Kerry, Ireland. Kavanagh was brought to Ireland at six weeks of age and raised by her mother and grandfather Paddy Kavanagh. She learned Irish as one of her spoken languages. She continued to study Irish in Dublin City University and earned a degree in Irish and journalism.

Kavanagh came to national attention after an event which occurred on 30 May 2013, in Dublin. She was standing at Parnell Street with a boy, when a group of teenagers, grabbed her face and spat on her whilst calling her racial slurs. Her response to this and other similar events in her life where she experienced racism inspired her to make an online Twitter campaign celebrating the diversity of Irish people.

Kavanagh created a blog about travelling with her mother, and wrote a book about growing up as an Irish-speaking person overcoming loss, and racism, as well as her love of the language. Kavanagh is known for being an advocate for the Irish language and is a Duolingo-partnered streamer for Irish and English.

Today, Kavanagh works as a video game producer, freelance journalist and content creator. She created the website We are Irish which is designed to share good news and stories about Irish people, the country and anything related to either. She has worked on TG4 and with the trade union Fórsa. Her YouTube videos are centred on travel vlogs and gaming videos, both in the Irish language, and were funded through her Patreon account.

In 2020, Kavanagh joined the new independent Anti-Racism Committee. Kavanagh was made a member of the TG4 Audience Council in 2020 and will serve on that group for five years. She was also one of the National Ambassadors for Culture Night (Ireland) in 2020.

In July 2021, Kavanagh worked alongside three other Gaeilgeoirí to launch the official Irish-language translation of the online multiplayer video game Among Us. She also created two compilations of resources for learning Irish entitled DIY Gaeilge: 150 Online Irish Language Resources and DIY Gaeilge Part Two: 50 More Irish Language Resources.

== Bibliography ==
- ANSEO. New Island Books. October 16, 2019. ISBN 1848407491.
- DIY Gaeilge: 150 Online Irish Language Resources.
- DIY Gaeilge Part Two: 50 More Irish Language Resources.
- Experience Ireland. Lonely Planet. Mar 2022. ISBN 9781838694692.
