= Adam Rudden =

Irish poet

Adam Rudden is a Dublin-based Irish poet. His work has been published in poetry periodicals including Poetry Ireland Review, Cyphers, Electric Acorn, Jacobyte Poetry, Agenda and Horizons.

His collections of poetry have been published by Lapwing Publications, including Fallen Eyelashes (2004), Braille lips in the Dark (2007), Stopwatch (2009) and Solar Winds and Ions (2011). In March 2012, Solar Winds and Ions was made available as a free download on Poetry Ireland's website.
