= Ivy Bannister =

American-born writer living in Ireland

Ivy Bannister (born July 11, 1951) is an American-born writer living in Ireland.

The daughter of Richard and Hortense Eberhart, she was born Ivy Eberhart in New York City, grew up in Connecticut and was educated at Smith College and Trinity College in Dublin. In 1976, she married Frank Bannister.

Her poetry and short stories have appeared in various anthologies of Irish writing. Her poems have also appeared in publications such as The Irish Times, the Sunday Tribune, the Poetry Ireland Review and THE SHOp.

Bannister has received the:

- O. Z. Whitehead Award in 1986
- Hennessy Literary Award in 1988
- Listowel Award in 1987
- PJ O'Connor Award in 1991
- Francis MacManus Award in 1999

== Selected works ==
- The Wilde Circus Show (1990)
- The Magician and other stories (1996)
- The Wall, play, received the Mobil Ireland Playwriting Award in 1993
- The Woman who has Difficulty Answering the Phone (2001)
- Blunt Trauma (2005)
- Vinegar and spit (2008)
