= Evelyn Conlon =

Irish novelist, short story writer, and essayist

- Born: 1952 (age 73–74)
- Occupations: Novelist and short story writer
- Children: 2
- Writing career
- Language: English
- Genres: Fiction, novel, short story

Evelyn Conlon (born 1952) is an Irish novelist, short story writer, and essayist. Over the course of her career, Conlon has published dozens of novels, short stories, and essays. Her 2003 novel, Skin of Dreams, was shortlisted for Irish Novel of the Year.

Conlon is a member of Aosdána and has been appointed a writer-in-residence at educational institutions around the world, including the University College Dublin, the University of Minnesota, and Mishkanot Sha’anamin, Jerusalem. She is an adjunct professor in the creative writing MFA program at Carlow University, Pittsburgh, Pennsylvania.

A member of Irishwomen United, Conlon was a founding member of the Dublin rape crisis centre in 1979.

== Biography ==
Conlon was born in Rockcorry, County Monaghan, where she spent her childhood. She was educated at St. Patrick's College in Maynooth and briefly attended University College Dublin.

At the age of 19, Conlon went to Australia by ship in 1972 and worked at various jobs around the country. When she came back to Ireland by bus overland in 1975, she gave birth to her first child and returned to education at Maynooth College, where she also started a child care centre (crèche). While earning her degree, she gave birth to her second child and separated from her husband.

Conlon lives in Dublin with her partner Fintan Vallely, a musician and ethnomusicologist.

== Writing ==
Conlon said that she developed a passion to "be a novelist before [she] knew what a novel was."

She received her first accolade for writing when she won the European Schools Day essay competition at the age of 17, and published her first piece of writing the same year in New Irish Writing at The Irish Press.

Some of Conlon’s fictional work explores sociopolitical issues such as capital punishment, feminism, and the plight of refugees. In observing the overlap between her writing and political advocacy, Conlon has noted, "I don’t think you can be a ‘feminist’ writer, I think you’re a writer. I am a writer who is a feminist. And, my feminist consciousness affects the sort of things I enjoy writing about."

Conlon has also been described as a "politically engaged writer [who] casts a sometimes acerbic eye on the female experience in the Ireland of the late twentieth and early twenty-first century".

== Selected works ==
=== Novels ===
- Stars in the Daytime (1989)
- A Glassful of Letters (1998)
- Skin of Dreams (2003)
- Not the Same Sky (2013)

=== Short story collections ===
- My Head is Opening (1987)
- Taking Scarlet as a Real Colour (1993)
- An Cloigeann is a Luach - What Worth the Head : County Limerick Anthology (1998)
- Telling (2000)
- Cutting the Night in Two – with Hans-Christian Oeser (2001)
- Later On: The Monaghan Bombing Memorial Anthology (2004)

== Memoir ==
- Reading Rites: Books, writing and other things that matter (2024, Blackstaff Press)
