= Karen Frances McCarthy =

Irish writer

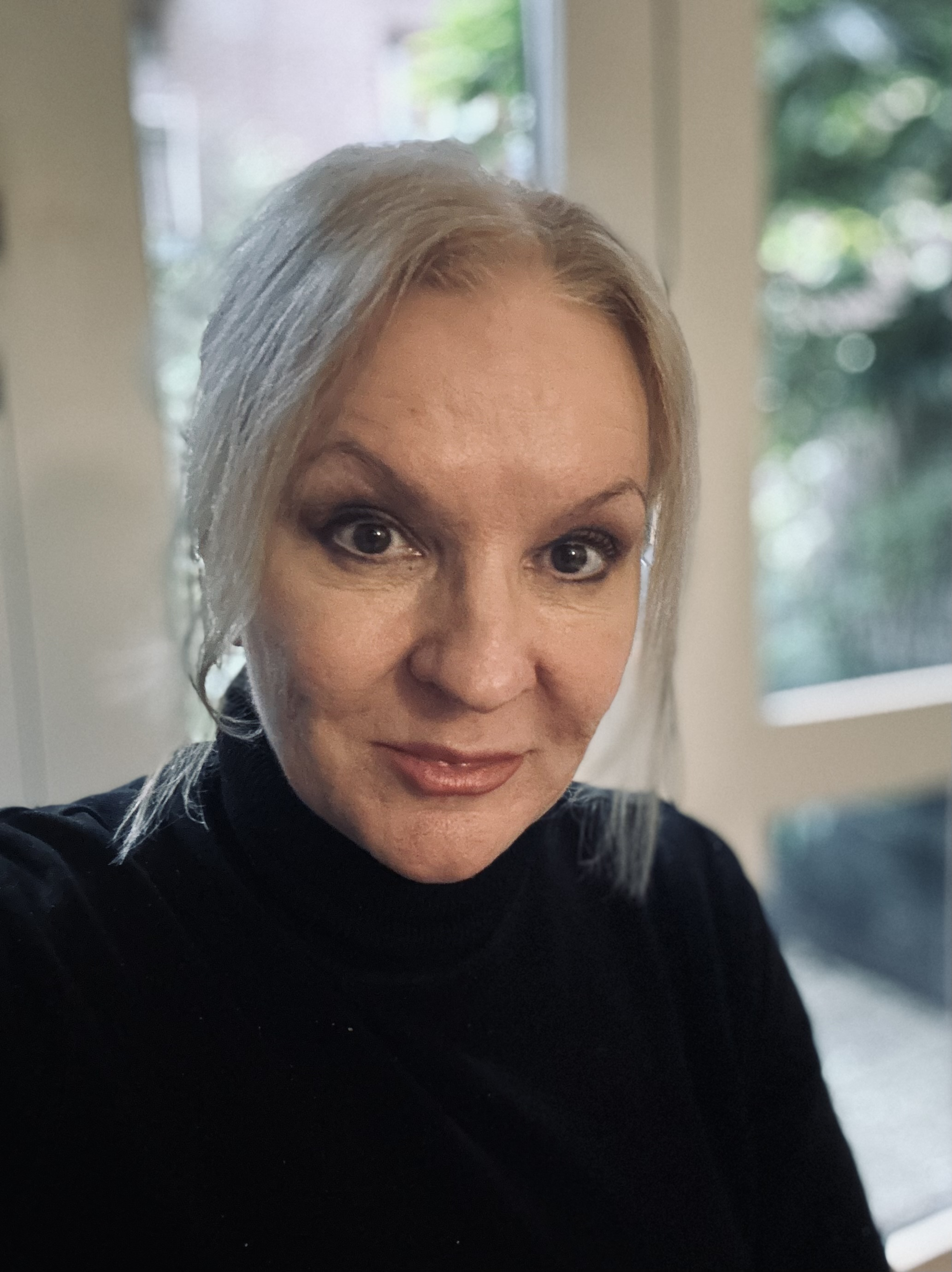

Karen Frances McCarthy (born 1971 in Dublin, Ireland) is an author, academic, former political journalist, and Spiritualist. Initially known for her work as an embedded war correspondent in Iraq and her reporting on U.S. politics, she later gained international attention for her transition into Spiritualism following a personal tragedy. Her doctoral research at the University of Birmingham, a member of the UK's Russell Group of research-intensive universities, explored the effects of cultural shifts in consciousness theory, postsecularism, and re-enchantment on contemporary American ghost literature. She is the sister of Irish Olympian Earl McCarthy.

== Political writing ==
=== Journalism ===
As a journalist, McCarthy began covering US politics for a variety of newspapers, including Irish Examiner. and the Riz Khan Show on Al Jazeera English. In 2007, she was an embedded reporter in Iraq. She was one of the first to write about Sunni Awakening Councils in Anbar Province, Al Qaeda HQ in Baqubah, for The Irish Times.

=== Books ===
==== The Other Irish ====
In 2010, McCarthy's first book The Other Irish was published by Sterling Publishing Inc. For this work, she was named one of Ireland's top female broadcasters who have had an international impact. The book was supported by Ireland's Department of Foreign Affairs as part of the country's Reconciliation and Anti-Sectarian Fund as a cultural outreach project. The announcement of support for these projects was made on 28 November 2012. Announcing the funding, Ireland's Tánaiste (deputy prime minister) said the project was one of a number that would help address ongoing sectarian division and support reconciliation efforts in Northern Ireland.

As part of the reconciliation effort, McCarthy travelled throughout Ireland, talking to various Protestant communities, including the Ulster Scots Agency, the Public Records Office of Northern Ireland, the Linen Hall Library, and the Monreagh Heritage Centre. It was also supported in the media by Ian Adamson, OBE, and William Humphrey DUP MLA in the Belfast Telegraph. She appeared on RTÉ's History Show with Miles Dungan, NPR with Kathleen Dunn, the BBC's Saturday Morning Radio Show with John Toal. The book was reviewed favourably by the Huffington Post, and by Prof. James Flannery of Emory College for the Irish America Magazine.

== Spiritual writing ==
=== Journalism ===
In 2011, McCarthy stopped covering politics and began to contribute features articles on spirituality, existential belief systems and philosophy of religion for The Irish Times, Salon, Huffington Post Religion Beliefnet, Belfast Media, and The Irish Voice.

=== Books ===
==== Till Death Don't Us Part ====
In 2011, McCarthy had what she has described as an awakening. In 2020, she described the events leading up to this in a memoir Till Death Don't Us Part (White Crow Books, 2020), which was published by White Crow Books. It is described a true and transformational story of one woman's extraordinary journey from skepticism, through tragedy, into awakening to the knowledge that consciousness is not an emergent property of the brain and continues after brain death. The story recounts McCarthy's change in focus and career path, and how she moved toward Spiritualism and writing about spirituality as a result of these experiences.

It was described by NYU Professor Ernest Rubinstein as "a story that doesn't just save us from our fear of death but also from the vague uneasiness and sense of disconnection that sometimes infect a life." It does this by emphasizing the existential implications of continued existence in this life and how joy and purpose come from having an open mind, an open heart, the courage to heal, and from being willing to embrace and share the compassion offered us from non-physical spaces.

Feature article versions of the story appeared in the British magazine Psychic News and the politically progressive/liberal news magazine Salon.

===== Reception =====
In the first week of its release, Till Death Don't Us Part was ranked No. 1 New Release in its category on Amazon. McCarthy's next book, Still Here, |url=http://karenfrancesmccarthy.com/books |accessdate=11 August 2026}}</ref>is forthcoming from White Crow Books in 2027.

It was featured in various print media outlets, including Forbes, The Irish Times, The Irish Voice and Psychic News, and in the Life After Life blog of Raymond Moody. She appeared on various radio shows and podcasts, including New Thinking Allowed with Jeffrey Mishlove, New Realities TV with Alan Steinfeld, Seek Reality with Roberta Grimes, Psychic Matters with Ann Theato, and The Conan Doyle Casebook. She also gave lectures at the Edgar Cayce Center of New York and the Sir Arthur Conan Doyle Centre in Scotland.

The book was described by Academy Award-nominated filmmaker Juanita Wilson as "A gripping modern love story that transcends all boundaries." Peabody Award winning documentarian Alexandra Lipsitz was quoted as saying, "Her experiences made me believe in things I never thought I could believe in." Susan Shapiro, New York Times bestselling author of Unhooked & Byline Bible, wrote: "It's a fascinating transformational journey that challenges all our assumptions about death." Author Jennifer Belle wrote, "A news reporter and former diehard skeptic, McCarthy gives us an entertaining, impeccably researched, and brilliantly written page-turner about continuing love after life, that will move, amaze, and provide deep comfort with its glorious, inspiring, and deafening ring of truth."

It also received favorable praise from Tricia J. Robertson, former President of the Society for Psychical Research, Minister David R Bruton MBA, President Spiritualists' National Union & Principal of the Arthur Findlay College, Nancy Eubel, former co-executive director of Association for Research and Enlightenment, and Victor and Wendy Zammit, co-authors of A Lawyer Presents the Evidence for the Afterlife.

==== The Re-Enchanted Ghost in Contemporary American Fiction ====
In 2026, Karen Frances McCarthy published her monograph The Re-Enchanted Ghost in Contemporary American Fiction (Routledge, 2026) as part of the Routledge series on speculative fiction. The work examines an emerging trend of spectrality and liminality in contemporary American fiction, arguing that the ghost story has long reflected the culture from which it emerges, offering insight into human struggle, meaning, and values within a given historical moment. Where traditional ghost narratives often position the ghost as metaphor, plot device, or haunting presence within physical space, McCarthy explores how contemporary fiction reimagines spectrality in ways that engage wider spiritual and existential questions.

Through a postsecular reading of four twenty first century American novels, The Lovely Bones by Alice Sebold, The Five People You Meet in Heaven by Mitch Albom, The Brief History of the Dead by Kevin Brockmeier, and Lincoln in the Bardo by George Saunders, the book develops a critical framework for examining language, form, and imagined landscapes as sites of haunting and re enchantment. McCarthy argues that contemporary American spectral fiction moves beyond conventional ghost narratives, opening space for renewed engagement with questions of consciousness, transcendence, and human meaning in the modern world.

==== Critical Reviews ====
Critical reception for The Re-Enchanted Ghost in Contemporary American Fiction was positive, with scholars praising its originality and contribution to literary studies. Eleanor Dobson of University of Birmingham described it as “a groundbreaking exploration of postsecular ghost literature” and “essential reading” for scholars of contemporary fiction and spirituality. Esther Peeren of University of Amsterdam commended McCarthy’s “fresh perspective on literary specters,” highlighting her insight into ghosts as figures who are “themselves haunted.” Harry Lee Poe, emeritus professor at Union University, noted that McCarthy explains “why ghost stories simply will not go away,” showing how spectral narratives continue to address enduring cultural and existential questions. Dale Bailey of Lenoir-Rhyne University called the study “a potent metaphor for healing our fragmented culture,” while Ernest Rubinstein of New York University wrote that McCarthy “opens a new chapter in the interpretation of ghost stories.” Rona Cran of University of Birmingham praised its “thought provoking prose” and “insightful interventions” into loneliness, liminality, haunting, and human connection. Collectively, reviewers recognized the book as an original and significant contribution to scholarship on contemporary fiction, spirituality, and postsecular thought.

== Academic Career ==
McCarthy pursued doctoral research at the University of Birmingham, a member of the UK's Russell Group of research universities, where her work examined cultural shifts in consciousness theory, post-secularism, and re-enchantment in contemporary American ghost literature.

Following the completion of her PhD, she developed a scholarly focus on literature and consciousness studies. She is an adjunct instructor at New York University (NYU), where she teaches courses on spectral and speculative fiction and cultural narratives. Her research bridges literary studies and consciousness theory, and she has contributed to peer-reviewed journals in related fields. She has presented at international conferences, including the American Literary Association Conference (“Narrative Experimentation and the Disruption of Spectral Expectations in George Saunders’s Lincoln in the Bardo”), the FSJ Conference, 14th International Conference on Language and Literary Studies (“The Shape of Suffering: Empathy, Eco-Consciousness, and Spectrality in Kevin Brockmeier’s Fiction”), and the 2024 Postgraduate Conference in Theological and Religious Studies (“Literature as Sacred Text”).

== Spiritualism ==
After the transformation she experienced after the death of her fiancé, the events described in Till Death Don't Us Part, McCarthy became an advocate of the ethical practice and healing potential of mediumship. She underwent years of intensive training at Arthur Findlay College, a school of Spiritualism. She holds three awards from its governing body, the Spiritualist National Union.

Based in New York and Dublin, she continues to write about spirituality, bereavement, and metaphysical issues. She offers private consultations to clients around the world, and she teaches subjects, including consciousness theory, mysticism, and contemplative writing with The Shift Network, The Arthur Conan Doyle Cantre, the Edgar Cayce Center of New York, One Spirit Learning Alliance, and Humanity's Team.

McCarthy has written about the potential for mediumship to provide comfort and healing, and is an advocate for palliative and afterlife education and for maintaining healthy relationships with those who have died. She has been interviewed by the Huffington Post and Forbes and about her work.

She is a member of the Society for Psychical Research and the Spiritualists' National Union in the UK, and the Institute of Noetic Sciences in the US. In addition to her role as adjunct instructor at NYU, she is a faculty member of the Shift Network. She teaches courses in spectral literature and Irish mythology with the Shift Network, and privately teaches Spiritualism and spiritual development in her private practice.
