= Ciaran O'Driscoll =

Irish poet and novelist

Ciaran O'Driscoll (born 1943) is an Irish poet and novelist born in Callan, County Kilkenny and living in Limerick.

== Biography ==
Ciaran O’Driscoll lives in Limerick. He worked as a lecturer for the School of Art and Design at the Limerick Institute of Technology before he retired. A member of Aosdána, he has published nine books of poetry, including Gog and Magog (1987), Moving On, Still There (2001), and Surreal Man (2006). His fourth collection, The Old Women of Magione, was translated into Italian in 2006, and a Selected Poems in Slovene translation was published in 2013. A poetry collection, Angel Hour (2021), is his most recent publication. Liverpool University Press published his childhood memoir, A Runner Among Falling Leaves (2001). His novel, A Year's Midnight, was published by Pighog Press (2012). His novella The Golden Ass (Limerick Writers' Centre Publishing, Limerick, 2024)

== Work ==
His work has been featured in special Irish issues of European literary journals and anthologized on several occasions.

Eamon Grennan, writing in The Irish Times, called him "a poet in confident possession and exercise of his craft. [His] poems do what good poems should do, widening and deepening the world for the rest of us."

According to the critic Michael S. Begnal, reviewing O'Driscoll's The Speaking Trees, "his poems often conjure dream-like or visionary states... His language is clear and deliberate but describes a bizarre or surreal subject matter."

O'Driscoll's poems have been translated into many languages, including French, German, Irish, Italian, Hungarian, Russian, Scots Gaelic, Serbo-Croat, Slovenian, and Spanish. His awards for poetry include a Bursary in Literature from the Irish Arts Council (1983), the James Joyce Literary Millennium Prize (1989), and the Patrick and Katherine Kavanagh Fellowship in Poetry (2000). His poem ‘Please Hold’ (featured in Forward's anthology Poems of the Decade) has become a set text for A-Level English Literature.

== Bibliography ==
=== Collections of poetry ===
- Angel Hour, SurVision Books, Dublin, 2021
- The Speaking Trees, SurVision Books, Dublin, 2018
- Life Monitor (Three Spires Press, Cork, 2009)
- Surreal Man, Pighog, Brighton, 2006
- Moving On, Still There: New and Selected Poems, Dedalus Press, Dublin, 2001
- The Old Women of Magione (Dedalus Press, Dublin, 1998)
- Listening to Different Drummers (Dedalus Press, Dublin, 1993)
- The Myth of the South (Dedalus Press, Dublin, 1992)
- The Poet and His Shadow (Dedalus Press, Dublin, 1990)
- Gog and Magog (Salmon Publishing, Galway, 1987)

=== In translation ===
- Nadzorovanje Ziivljenja (Selected poems with Slovenian translations). Kud France Preseren, Ljubljana, 2013.
- Vecchie Donne di Magione (a collection of his poems with Italian translations by Rita Castigli). Volumnia Editrice, Perugia, 2006

=== Novel ===
- A Year’s Midnight (Pighog Press, Brighton, 2012)
- The Golden Ass (Limerick Writers' Centre Publishing, Limerick, 2024)

=== Memoir ===
- A Runner Among Falling Leaves, Liverpool University Press, 2001
