= Margaret E. Ward =

Irish journalist

- Born: New York, United States
- Education: Loyola University Maryland, State University of New York at Purchase, Dublin City University
- Occupations: Entrepreneur, RTÉ Board, Journalist
- Notable credit(s): Newstalk, The Irish Times, The Sunday Times
- Children: 2
- Website: Margaret E. Ward, Margaret Ward's LinkedIn

Margaret E. Ward is an Irish entrepreneur, journalist and broadcaster based in Dublin, Ireland. She has worked in The Irish Times, Sunday Times and as a presenter on Newstalk radio She's currently CEO of Clear Eye (formerly Clear Ink).

== Early and personal life ==
Margaret E. Ward is a native of New York, with Irish parents. She moved to Dublin in 1995 where she still lives with her husband and two children.

== Entrepreneur ==
Ward is the founder and CEO of Clear Eye, a leadership consultancy firm based in Dublin. In 2010, she founded a networking group in Ireland called Women on Air to give women the skills and confidence to express their expert opinions on radio and TV. She has been recognised by many organisations including: Silicon Republic's – Women Invent 100 – "The Community Builders: 13 women helping women in STEM"; Silicon Republic's – the Women Invent 100 list – the Community Builders; Irish Tatler: Business Women of Influence List 2015; Image Businesswoman of the Year shortlist; Women Mean Business Awards shortlist (Social Entrepreneurship) and for the Women Mean Business awards.

== Journalist ==
Ward started writing professionally while still in university, and her first front-page story appeared in Gannett Newspapers (New York) in 1990. Ward started her career in Irish journalism at the Irish Times in 1996. She worked there as an investigative journalist, personal finance columnist and news reporter. In 2000, she joined the Sunday Times to head up their first Money section in Ireland and she remained with them until 2005. She returned to the Irish Times and wrote two business columns, Cents, Nonsense and Platform. Ward also worked as the breakfast business presenter on Newstalk radio during Ireland's bailout period on weekday mornings between 2010 and 2011. She writes occasional editorials for Independent Newspapers on diversity and business. Ward has appeared on television and radio, including tonight with Vincent Browne, Tubridy on 2FM, The History Show, RTE Radio 1 Saturday View, TV3, BBC and NPR. Ward has been awarded the Law Society of Ireland's Justice Media award for social and campaigning journalism and the ICL Science & Technology journalism award.

She served on the RTÉ Board of directors from 2015 to 2020 and the board of Fáilte Ireland in 2019–2024. She previously served on the board of European Movement Ireland, as chair of Women on Air (2010–2013) and the Business Journalists Association of Ireland.
