= Elin O'Hara Slavick =

American artist and poet

elin o'Hara slavick is an interdisciplinary artist, poet, professor, curator, critic and activist. She began teaching in the department of art at the University of North Carolina at Chapel Hill in 1994, where she held the titles of distinguished term professor, associate chair and director of graduate studies. She was the Artist-in-Residence in the College of Health Sciences, UC, Irvine 2022-2025. She was the Huntington Art and Research Fellow at Caltech in 2022.

== Career ==
Slavick received a BA from Sarah Lawrence College and a MFA in photography from the School of the Art Institute of Chicago. Her work has been exhibited internationally in both solo and group exhibitions. Her published books include Bomb After Bomb: A Violent Cartography (with a forward from Howard Zinn) and After Hiroshima (with an essay by James Elkins). She was once represented by Cohen Gallery in Los Angeles.

In 2018, she has published a chapbook of Surrealist poems entitled Cameramouth (SurVision Books, Ireland.) She published Holding History In Our Hand on the 75th commemoration of Hiroshima and Nagasaki. The book was commissioned by the Peace Resource Center at Wilmington College in Ohio. A video adaptation of the book was commissioned for the 80th commemoration for the exhibition Memorializing the Hibakusha Experience at Wilmington College in 2025. Slavick collaborated with Madeleine Richardson on the film, Holding History in Our Hand.

== Personal life ==
Slavick was raised by a German mother and a nationless Catholic father, and began taking photographs as a very young child. Her parents were progressive pacifists, activists against war and hunger, greed and corruption. Slavick is married to epidemiologist David Richardson and has two children.
