= Maeve Kelly =

Irish writer (1930–2025)

Maeve Kelly (2 July 1930 – 1 August 2025) was an Irish writer, known for her novels, poems and short stories. She was also known as a feminist activist and for her advocacy on behalf of women and children who suffered from domestic abuse.

== Life and career ==
Kelly was born in Ennis, County Clare, Ireland, on 2 July, 1930, and raised in Dundalk, County Louth. She was trained as a nurse in Oxford and at St Andrew's Hospital in London.

In 1958 Kelly married Gerard O'Brien Kelly. In the early years of their marriage they farmed in County Clare; in 1972 they moved closer to Limerick city. They had two children, Joseph and Oona. Oona was killed in a motorcycle crash in 1991, a loss reflected in Kelly's poetry collection Lament for Oona.

Kelly wrote novels, short stories and poems, often dealing with women's lives and struggles. Her first published story appeared in the Irish Press in 1971. She received a Hennessy Literary Award in 1972.

In the 1970s, Kelly joined the women's movement and co-founded Adapt House, a Limerick refuge for women suffering from domestic violence. She administered it for 15 years. She was also the founder of the Limerick Federation of Women's Organisations and the National Federation of Refugees.

Kelly died on 1 August 2025, at age 95.

== Works ==
=== Fiction ===
- A Life of Her Own (1976), short stories
- Necessary Treasons (1985), novel
- Orange Horses (1990), short stories
- Florrie's Girls (1989), novel
- Alice in Thunderland: A Feminist Fairytale (1993)

=== Poetry ===
- Resolution (1986)
- Lament for Oona (2005)
- A Last Loving (2016)
