= Malsachanus =

Malsachanus (fl. 8th or 9th century) was an Irish Latin writer.

== Overview ==
Very little appears to be known of Malsachanus. Cambridge lists Ars Malsachani. Ed M. Roger. Traitè du verbe publiè d'après le ms lat. 13026 de lat Bibliothèque nationale, Paris 1905.
