= Colmán N. Ó Clabaigh =

Author, medievalist, and Benedictine monk

Br. Colmán N. Ó Clabaigh OSB is an author, medievalist and monk in Glenstal Abbey, Co. Limerick. His academic work focuses on the history of Irish monasticism.

== Career ==
He received his doctorate in 1998 from the National University of Ireland. He was a fellow in the Mícheál Ó Cléirigh Institute, University College Dublin. In 2013 his monograph The Friars in Ireland, 1224–1540 was awarded the 2013 Prize for Irish Historical Research by the National University of Ireland. Since then he has been a visiting professor at the School of Theology, St John's University, Collegeville, Minnesota, and later a Burns Visiting Scholar in Boston College.

== Selected works ==
- The friars in Ireland, 1224-1540, Four Courts Press, Co. Dublin (2010)
- Art and devotion in late medieval Ireland, Four Courts Press, Co. Dublin (2006)
- The Franciscans in Ireland, 1400-1534: from reform to Reformation, Blackrock, Co. Dublin: Columba Press (2000)
- Prayer and Thought in Monastic Tradition: Essays in Honour of Benedicta Ward, SLG, London (2014)
- The Irish Benedictines : a history, Blackrock, Co. Dublin: The Columba Press (2005)
