= Tony Bailie =

British writer

- Occupation: Author

Tony Bailie is a novelist, journalist and environmentalist from Downpatrick, County Down, Northern Ireland.

== Works ==
Tony Bailie is an Irish writer and journalist who, as of 2018, had published three novels and two poetry collections.

As a journalist, he has written mainly for the Irish News, but also for the Guardian and the Irish Independent.

His first novel, The Lost Chord, published by Lagan Press in 2006, tells the story of a hard-living and enigmatic rock star called Gino Morgan who "disappears." Told from the perspective of a fellow band member the novel explores the impact the disappearance has on those who were closest to Gino and the chaos that comes back into their lives when rumours start to circulate that the singer is still alive and may be about to come out of hiding. Bailie’s second novel, ecopunks, was published in November 2010. It has been described as "environmental parable for the 21st century". Its main character is an "ecowarrior" who becomes involved in campaigns around the world, in the jungles of the Amazon and Indonesia, and the nuclear testing grounds of the South Pacific. His third novel, A Verse to Murder, is available as an e-book.

His first collection of poetry, Coill (the Irish word for forest), was published by Lapwing Publications in 2005. Belfast-based poetry journal The Black Mountain Review said it contained “haiku-style poems which fit nicely with early Irish of Gaelic traditions.” Bailie's second collection, Tranquillity of Stone, published by Lapwing in 2006, was long-listed for the London New Poetry Award.

A short story, The Druid’s Dance, was featured in the crime fiction anthology Requiems for the Departed, published by Morrigan Books in June 2010, which also featured fellow Irish writers Ken Bruen, Stuart Neville, Arlene Hunt, Brian McGilloway, and Sam Millar.

His publication Mountain Under Heaven won the James Tate International Poetry Prize in 2019.

In 2023 he became an accredited Shinrin Yoku Japanese Forest Bathing practitioner.

Bailie plays guitar in the rock band Samson Stone.

=== Publication list ===
- The Lost Chord (novel). Lagan Press (2006) ISBN 1-904652-34-4
- Coill (poetry). Lapwing Publications (2006) ISBN 1-905425-05-8
- Tranquillity of Stone Poetry. Lapwing Publications (2010) ISBN 1-907276-37-8
- ecopunks (novel). Lagan Press (2010)
- The Druid’s Dance Short Story - featured in the crime fiction anthology Requiems for the Departed, Morrigan Books (2010) ISBN 1-4515-3968-1
- Mountain Under Heaven (poetry). SurVision Books (2019) ISBN 978-1-912963-09-6
- A Verse to Murder (2012)
- Mountain Under Heaven (poetry). SurVision Books (2019) ISBN 978-1-912963-09-6
- Paws in Time (2020)

== See also ==
- List of Northern Irish writers
