= John W. Sexton =

Irish poet and writer

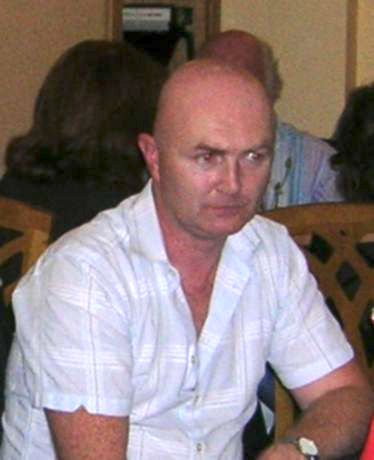
John W. Sexton, 2006

John William Sexton (born 1958) is an Irish poet, short-story writer, radio script-writer and children's novelist. He also writes under the pseudonyms of Sex W. Johnston and Jack Brae Curtingstall.

== Life ==
Sexton was born of Irish parents in Newington Green, London, in 1958. He moved to Ireland in 1982 and now resides in Kenmare, County Kerry.

He was born Catholic but has disowned that religion and describes himself as a pagan. He is inspired by what he calls a Muse Goddess, which is "the feminine and ancient energy that informs creation".

== Work ==
=== Poetry and fiction ===
After moving to Ireland in his early twenties, Sexton's first fiction and poetry appeared in the New Irish Writing supplement of the daily Irish newspaper The Irish Press, edited by David Marcus. Under Marcus' mentorship he began writing book reviews for that newspaper, contributing reviews of poetry, folklore, and comparative religion during the early to mid 1980s.

Sexton's first published short story, Blackthorn, appeared in New Irish Writing in 1983 and was short-listed for the Hennessy Literary Award in 1984. Much of his fiction and poetry has been identified as falling into the categories of Magic Realism, Literary Fantasy and Science Fiction. He has published short stories in the Irish science fiction journal Albedo One. His short story On a Planet Similar to Ours, the Virgin Mary Says No first appeared in Albedo One No. 23 and was reprinted in the 2005 science fiction anthology Emerald Eye: The Best Irish Imaginative Fiction (Aeon Press, Dublin 2005). His fiction has also appeared in The Stinging Fly, Books Ireland and The Journal of Irish Literature.

Sexton's poetry has appeared in many leading Irish journals including The Stinging Fly, Poetry Ireland Review, THE SHOp, Southword, The Stony Thursday Book and The Penny Dreadful Magazine. He has also appeared in many poetry anthologies, including Or Volge L'Anno: At The Year's Turning (Dedalus, Dublin 1998), Poets for the Millennium (Bradshaw Books, Cork 1999), Something Beginning With P (The O'Brien Press, Dublin 2004), In The Criminal's Cabinet (Nth Position, London 2004), Our Shared Japan (Dedalus, Dublin 2007), The Echoing Years: An Anthology Of Poetry From Canada & Ireland (WIT / SCOP / Sir Wilfred Grenfell College, Ireland and Canada 2007), and Seeds of Gravity: An Anthology of Contemporary Surrealist Poetry from Ireland (SurVision Books, Dublin 2020). In 2019 he was invited by the Limerick Writers' Centre to be the inaugural Poet Laureate / an tOllamh for Limerick City and County, as part of April is Poetry Month in Limerick.

=== Music ===
In 1999 Sexton collaborated with Stranglers frontman Hugh Cornwell on a CD project where, under the pseudonym Sex W. Johnston, he provided lyrics and vocals for their eponymous CD Sons of Shiva. The CD was originally available on the Internet under the independent label, HIS Records (HIS CD001, 1999). This version contained 9 tracks and is no longer available. The CD was then signed to Track Records, expanded to 10 tracks and released in September 2002 (Track Records, TRK1018CD, 2002). It was launched that same year with a live gig at the Brighton Psychedelic Festival.

=== Radio ===
Between 1999 and 2002 Sexton created and wrote the children's science fiction comedy-drama The Ivory Tower, produced and directed by Jacqui Corcoran, for RTÉ Radio. It ran for four seasons, clocking up 103 half-hour episodes. It was for this series that he created the character of Johnny Coffin who was eventually to appear in the novels published by The O'Brien Press.

=== Editorship and awards ===
Sexton was the fiction editor for The Cork Literary Review in 2007. In that same year he won the Listowel literary festival Poetry Prize for his poem The Green Owl. Also in 2007 he was awarded a Patrick and Katherine Kavanagh Fellowship in Poetry.

== Bibliography ==
=== Poetry collections ===
- The Prince's Brief Career (Cairn Mountain Publishing, Ireland 1996)
- Shadows Bloom / Scáthanna Faoi Bhláth (Doghouse Books, Ireland 2004), haiku with Irish translation by Gabriel Rosenstock
- Vortex (Doghouse Books, Ireland 2005)
- Petit Mal (Revival Press, Ireland 2009)
- The Offspring of the Moon (Salmon Poetry, Ireland 2013)
- Future Pass (Salmon Poetry, Ireland 2018)

=== Poetry chapbooks ===
- Inverted Night (SurVision Books, Ireland 2019)

=== Children's novels ===
- The Johnny Coffin Diaries (The O'Brien Press / RTÉ, Dublin 2001)
- Johnny Coffin School-Dazed (The O'Brien Press, Dublin 2002)

== Discography ==
- Sons of Shiva with Stranglers frontman Hugh Cornwell. HIS CD001 1999, Track Records TRK1018CD 2002
