= Ian Macpherson (comedian) =

Irish writer and performer

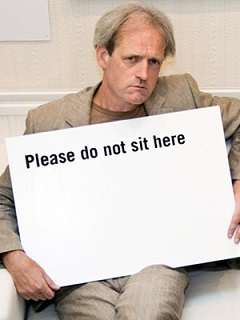
- Macpherson at Arthur Smith‘s Artuart exhibition at the 2008 Edinburgh Festival Fringe

Comedy career
- Years active: 1980s-present
- Medium: Stand-up, novels, short stories, plays
- Genres: comedy, surreal humour, wit
- Website: IanMacpherson.net

Ian Macpherson is an Irish writer and performer. He is best known for his stand-up comedy (especially alternative comedy) and for his comic novels including Deep Probings: The Autobiography of a Genius. In 2004, Deep Probings was featured as a BBC Radio 4 Book at Bedtime. He has also written a number of children's books including Late Again!

Macpherson won the first Time Out Comedy Award in 1988. Several one-man shows followed at the Edinburgh Festival Fringe, including The Chair at the Assembly Rooms in 2001 and The Joy Of Death at the Pleasance in 2002. At this time he was also writing comedy scripts and radio plays and he performed with Arnold Brown at the festival in 2008. His solo show The Everlasting Book Launch was on at the Assembly Rooms in 2015.

2011 saw the publication of The Autobiography of Ireland's Greatest Living Genius, an omnibus containing both Deep Probings and its previously unpublished sequel, Posterity Now. The Book of Blaise (or How To Survive The Menopause With Your Manhood Intact), came out in 2015. Sloot, the first installment of a proposed trilogy of post-postmodern crime anti-thrillers, was published in 2019. Hewbris was published in 2022.

Macpherson lives in Glasgow and is married to poet Magi Gibson.
