= Seamus O'Mahony =

Irish gastroenterologist (born 1960)

- Born: 1960 (age 65–66)
- Education: University College Cork
- Occupation: Non-fiction writer
- Medical career
- Profession: Doctor
- Field: Gastroenterology

Seamus O'Mahony (born 1960) is an Irish author and retired gastroenterologist.

O'Mahony studied medicine at University College Cork, graduating in 1983. He began his medical training in Cork before relocating to the United Kingdom to work in the National Health Service. After spending fourteen years in the NHS, he returned to Cork as a consultant gastroenterologist at Cork University Hospital until his retirement in 2020.

O'Mahony's first book, The Way We Die Now (2016), critiqued the overmedicalised nature of death, while his second book, Can Medicine Be Cured? The Corruption of a Profession (2019), criticised the modern medical profession. His third book, The Ministry of Bodies: Life and Death in a Modern Hospital (2021), is a reflection on his final year of working at Cork University Hospital. His fourth book, The Guru, the Bagman and the Sceptic (2023), is a study of Sigmund Freud, his associate, Ernest Jones and Wilfred Trotter, who although a friend of Jones was a sceptic as regards Freud.

He has published research relating to coeliac disease, inflammatory bowel disease and endoscopy, and is a fellow of the Royal College of Physicians of Edinburgh and the Royal College of Physicians.
