= James Simmons (poet) =

Irish poet, literary critic and songwriter (1933–2001)

James Stewart Alexander Simmons (1933–2001) was a poet, literary critic and songwriter from Derry, Northern Ireland.

== Biography ==
Simmons was born into a middle-class Protestant family in Derry in 1933. He attended Campbell College in Belfast before moving to the University of Leeds to read for a degree in English. He married Laura Stinson and returned to Northern Ireland to teach at Friends' School Lisburn for five years. His final foreign excursion was a position at Ahmadu Bello University in Nigeria, where he worked for three years. During this time, they had five children: Rachael, Sarah, Adam, Helen and Penelope. He returned to Northern Ireland in 1968, accepting a position at the recently opened New University of Ulster in Coleraine, where he remained until his retirement in 1984.

During the early '70s (the bloodiest times of all in Northern Ireland), he was the inspiration and leading light for The Resistance Cabaret, a satirical revue combining song, poetry and political comment on 'the troubles' and life in general, written and performed by Simmons and some of his students. Arguably, Simmons – whose passion for poetry was equaled only by his yearning to make it accessible to all the people – felt most at home in this setting, connecting with an audience that was moved to talk back.

Near the end of his teaching career at the University of Ulster, Simmons and his first wife Laura divorced. He married Imelda Foley, the sister of Derry poet and fiction writer Michael Foley, and had one child, Anna. After his marriage to Imelda ended, he had a son Ben with his third wife, fellow poet Janice Fitzpatrick. Simmons and Fitzpatrick started The Poets' House, initially in Islandmagee in County Antrim, later in Falcarragh in County Donegal.

== Career ==
When Simmons returned to Northern Ireland, he took part in The Belfast Group, together with such notables as Michael Longley, Seamus Heaney and Derek Mahon. In 1968, with his nephew Michael Stephens, Simmons went on a tour of universities in England. When he returned to Ireland, he established The Honest Ulsterman, the most important Irish literary journal of the next 35 years. Simmons served as the editor for 17 of the first 19 issues; he then passed control of the magazine onto a series of younger editors. The Honest Ulsterman published a series of more than 30 poetry chapbooks, including the first collections of work by Paul Muldoon ("Knowing My Place"), Michael Foley ("The Acne and the Ecstasy"), and Michael Stephens ("Blues for Chocolate Doherty"). Members of the Belfast Group frequently published in The Honest Ulsterman.

Whereas John Hewitt, the Ulster poet whom Simmons called 'the grandaddy of us all', ground out his truth by placing himself in the mortar and pestle of nature, Simmons ground his out by placing himself under a self-imposed public scrutiny. Using his own life for material, he explored his frailties in his poetry with the clinical detachment of a laboratory technician, the humour of a big soul, and the vulnerability of a lover. Perhaps his best epitaph is his own:

"Hiding in humility, In irony, and wit, It would be very hard to prove That Simmons is a shit"

He won several prizes for his poetry including the Gregory and Cholmondeley Awards.

He also wrote a critical biography of Seán O'Casey (London: Macmillan).

Throughout his career, Simmons wrote and performed exquisitely provocative, yet hilarious and humane, songs about every aspect of contemporary life. In 1970 he founded a new platform for bringing these to a wider audience, the satirical revue – The Resistance Cabaret – with Garvin Crawford, Victor Thompson, David Templeton, Eithne Murphy, Jim Brown, Mike Graves, Jon Marshall and Heather Hutchinson. In varying line-ups, they performed their unique repertoire regularly at venues throughout Northern Ireland until 1976. His poetry collection, West Strand Visions, contains some of the repertoire. He recorded three collections of his own songs – City & Eastern, Love In The Post, The Rostrevor Sessions – and produced a Resistance Cabaret album with the other members. He also set a number of Yeats' poems to music which he released on a tape cassette. The album was called Women's Company and included original songs and a selection of jazz standards.

Since his death Simmons' work has been increasingly marginalised – few anthologies include him – and a 'Collected Poems' is yet to appear. His songs, however, continue to challenge and delight appreciative audiences of The Resistance Cabaret around Northern Ireland - most often sung by Garvin Crawford in The Dufferin Arms, Killyleagh.

== Publications ==
- Ballad of a Marriage (1966)
- Late but in Earnest (London: Bodley Head; 1967)
- Ten Poems (1969)
- In the Wilderness (London: Bodley Head; 1969)
- No Ties (1970)
- Energy to Burn (London: Bodley Head; 1971)
- The Long Summer Still to Come (Belfast: Blackstaff Press; 1973)
- West Strand Visions (Belfast: Blackstaff Press; 1974)
- Judy Garland and the Cold War (Belfast: Blackstaff Press; 1976)
- The Selected James Simmons (Belfast: Blackstaff Press; 1978)
- Constantly Singing (Belfast: Blackstaff Press; 1980)
- From the Irish (Belfast: Blackstaff Press; 1985)
- Poems, 1956–1986 ([Introduction by Edna Longley] Dublin, The Gallery/UK, Bloodaxe 1986)
- At Six O'Clock in the Silence of Things (Belfast: Lapwing Publications; 1993)
- Sex, Rectitude and Loneliness (Belfast: Lapwing Publications; 1993)
- Mainstream (Galway: Salmon Poetry; 1995);
- The Company of Children (Galway: Salmon Poetry; 1999)

== Prizes ==
- Eric Gregory Award in 1962
- Cholmondeley Award

== See also ==
- List of Irish poets
