= Francis MacManus =

Author, broadcaster

Francis MacManus (8 March 1909 – 27 November 1965) was an Irish novelist and broadcaster.

== Life and writings ==
Born in Kilkenny, MacManus was educated in the local Christian Brothers school and later at St. Patrick's College, Dublin and University College Dublin. After teaching for eighteen years at the Synge Street CBS in Dublin, MacManus joined the staff of Radio Éireann (precursor to RTÉ, the Irish national broadcasting entity) in 1948 as Director of Features.

MacManus began writing while still teaching and first published a trilogy set in Penal times and concerning the life of Donnchadh Ruadh Mac Conmara, an author of Irish poetry in the Irish-language. The trilogy comprises the novels Stand and Give Challenge (1934), Candle for the Proud (1936) and Men Withering (1939).

A second trilogy followed which turned its attention to contemporary Ireland: This House Was Mine (1937), Flow On, Lovely River (1941), and Watergate (1942). The location was the fictional "Dombridge", based on Kilkenny, and deal with established themes of Irish rural life: obsessions with land, sexual frustration, and the trials of emigration and return. Other major works include the novel The Greatest of These (1943), concerning religious conflict in nineteenth-century Kilkenny, and the biographies Boccaccio (1947) and Saint Columban (1963). In his last two novels, MacManus descended into the depths of theological debate: The Fire in the Dust (1950) was followed by American Son (1959), a remarkable dialogue between conflicting modes of belief which reveals the strong influence of Roman Catholicism on the author.

MacManus died in Dublin 27 November 1965 at the age of 56, from a heart attack.

The RTÉ Francis MacManus Short Story Award was established in his memory in 1985.

== Bibliography ==
=== Short story collection ===
- Pedlar's Pack (Dublin: Talbot 1944)

=== Novels ===
- Stand and Give Challenge (Dublin: Talbot 1934; rep. Mercier 1964)
- Candle for the Proud (Dublin: Talbot 1936)
- This House was Mine (Dublin: Talbot 1937)
- Men Withering (Dublin: Talbot 1939; rep. Mercier 1972)
- The Wild Garden (Dublin: Talbot 1940)
- Flow on, Lovely River (Dublin: Talbot 1941)
- Watergate (Dublin: Talbot 1942; rep. Poolbeg 1979)
- The Greatest of These (Dublin: Talbot 1943)
- Statue for a Square (Dublin: Talbot 1945, illustrated by Eileen Coghlan)
- The Fire in the Dust (London: Cape 1950)
- American Son (London: Cape 1959)

=== Non-Fiction ===
- Boccaccio (London: Sheed & Ward 1947), biography.
- Seal Ag Ródaíocht/On the Road for a Time (Dublin: Sairseal agus Dill 1955), travel essays.
- St Columban (Dublin: Clonmore & Reynolds 1963), biography.
- The Years of the Great Test (Cork: Mercier Press 1967), history.

== The RTÉ Short Story Award in Honour of Francis MacManus ==
Set up in 1986 to honour writer and broadcaster Francis MacManus, the RTÉ Short Story Competition recognises and rewards the best new Irish fiction writing for radio. Since its inception, the competition has been a critically important launch pad for new and emerging writers in Ireland. The competition is free to enter and attracts thousands of entries every year. The total prize fund is €13,750 with the winner receiving an award of €5,000. The second and third placed writers receive €4,000 and €3,000 respectively. A further seven runners-up receive €250 each. A shortlist of ten stories is released in September, and the top prize-winners are announced on a RTÉ Arena special programme on RTÉ Radio 1 later. All 10 shortlisted stories are published on the RTÉ Culture website and broadcast in a season of new writing on RTÉ Radio 1. Each of the 10 short-listed stories is read and recorded by professional actors. The judges listen to these recordings and read the stories to consider their broadcasting and short story qualities before they select the winning entries. According to the entry form, "Over the past 25 years the competition has proved to be a launching pad for several new and emerging Irish writers and continues to offer a platform for the best of contemporary Irish fiction." Since 1985 over 500 stories from the competition have been broadcast. Among the names who have featured and who have gone on to win acclaim in Ireland and internationally are Cónal Creedon, Claire Keegan, Molly McCloskey, Anthony Glavin, Mary O'Donnell and Ivy Bannister. The panel of three judges for the 2012 competition is: Brendan Barrington, a Senior Editor at Penguin Ireland and editor of The Dublin Review; John MacKenna, author, and winner of the Irish Times, Hennessy and Cecil Day-Lewis awards as well as a Jacob's Award for his radio documentaries on Leonard Cohen; and Éilís Ní Dhuibhne, novelist and short-story writer. Past judges include novelists, Joseph O'Connor and Anne Enright. The competition is organised by veteran RTÉ producer, Seamus Hosey.

=== Past Winners of the RTÉ Radio 1 Francis MacManus Short Story Award ===
- 1993

Winner: "After the Ball" by Cónal Creedon

- 1999

Winner: "Love" by Ivy Bannister

2nd: : "Stay Close to the Water's Edge"

- 2000

Winner: "The Hanging Trees" by Ruth LeGoff

- 2001

Winner: "Dipping into the Darkness" by Maire McSweeney

2nd : "I am the Song – Sing Me" by Elizabeth Carty

3rd : " Jealousy" by Susan Knight

- 2002

Winner: "The Wind Across the Grass" by Nuala Ní Chonchúir

Joint 2nd: "Rebound" by Lorraine Francis

Joint 2nd: "Heaven" by Jim Mullarkey

- 2003

Winner: "Lemon Creams" by Vincent McDonnell

2nd : "Would you like to see a photograph?" by Billy Thompson

- 2004

Winner: "The Mango War" by Martin Malone

2nd : "Walking Toby" by Geraldine Mills

3rd : "Glimpse" by James Moynihan

- 2005

Winner: "Dark Horses" by Claire Keegan

2nd : "Pascal's Wager" by Michael J Farrell

3rd : "The World of Tides" by Bill Murray

- 2006

Winner: "A Thing of Beauty" by Hester Casey

2nd : "The Weight of Feathers" by Geraldine Mills

3rd : "For Scrap" by Gavin Corbett

- 2007

Winner: "Valediction" by Joe O'Donnell

2nd : "Loser" by Eileen Counihan

3rd : "The Man With No Name" by Gerry Boland

- 2008

Winner: "Hay" by Ciarán Folan

2nd : "Home Help" by Dolores Walsh

3rd : "Romance" by Alastair Hadden

- 2010

Winner: "Fishing for Dreams" by Joyce Russell

2nd : "Silverfish" by Eileen Lynch

3rd : "Comfort" by Sheila Mannix

- 2011

Winner: "Orca" by Austin Duffy

2nd : "Platform 17 – Grand Central Station" by Patrick Griffin

3rd : "Seven Steps Home" by Andrew Fox
