= Christina McKenna =

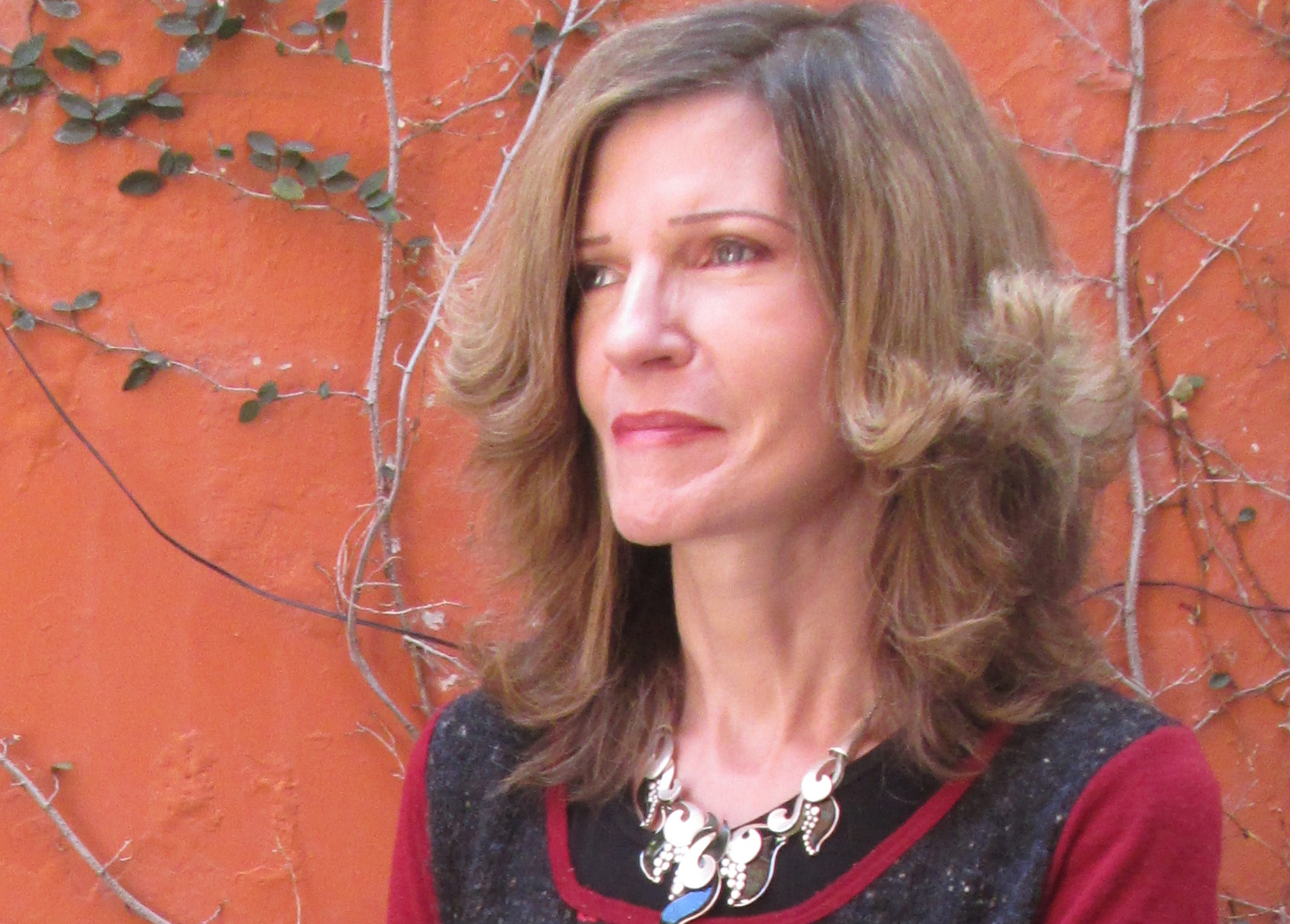
- Christina McKenna
- Born: 1957 (age 68–69); Northern Ireland
- Education: University of Ulster
- Occupation: Author
- Writing career
- Language: English
- Genre: Fiction
- Website: christina-mckenna.com

Christina McKenna (born 1957) is an Irish author and novelist. She has written books that comprise the Tailorstown series.

== Early life ==
McKenna grew up in Draperstown, Northern Ireland. She attended the Belfast College of Art where she obtained an honours degree in Fine Art and studied postgraduate English at the University of Ulster. In 1986, she left Northern Ireland and spent a decade teaching abroad. Since then she has lived and worked in Spain, Turkey, Italy, Ecuador and Mexico. McKenna is the seventh of nine children brought up on the farm in the townland of Forgetown. Her love of literature began in the early 1970s when her English teacher gave her a copy of Seamus Heaney's Door into the Dark. She asserts that his poetry "opened a door in the fearful me and I took refuge in the wonder of his prose. When I met him on those pages at that tender age I simply knew that one day in the far future I would be a writer."

In 2003, she started work on her memoir, My Mother Wore A Yellow Dress; this was published in 2004.

By 2025, she had published eight books.

== Publications ==
My Mother Wore A Yellow Dress (Wilson Publishing, Glasgow, Scotland, 2004) charts her struggle to make sense of the hidebound Catholicism of her childhood, and how art and poetry freed her to follow a more spiritual path. The memoir contains a chapter detailing her experience of the paranormal when, at age eleven, she and her family were subjected to prolonged poltergeist activity, which required a visit by an exorcist. She would later draw on this episode when writing her next work of non-fiction.

The Dark Sacrament (Gill & Macmillan, Dublin, 2006) co-authored with her husband, David M. Kiely, contains ten contemporary cases of exorcism in Ireland. A special American edition was published in October 2007 by HarperOne, San Francisco. It contains additional material.

Ireland's Haunted Women (2010 Poolbeg Press, Dublin) is a collection of true-life ghost stories set in the Ireland of the present day. The cases range from the bizarre to the utterly chilling as Christina faithfully records the testimony of ten women visited by the paranormal. In contrast to other collections in the genre, all the cases are told here for the first time.

The Misremembered Man her first novel, is set in rural Northern Ireland in 1974. It is a tragi-comic work, which charts the progress of a lonely farmer in his attempts to find a wife. All the while he is pursued by dark ghosts from a less-than-happy childhood, when he suffered at the hands of an order of nuns who ran an orphanage in the city of Derry. Since 2011 The Misremembered Man has sold nearly one million copies, has garnered more reviews on Amazon than any other book by an Irish author, held the Number One slot in Literary Fiction on Amazon.com during the spring of 2013. It has been translated into German, Spanish and Norwegian, with Russian, Lithuanian and Korean translations in the pipeline. Contrary to press reports, the film rights to this book have not been sold.

Her second novel, The Disenchanted Widow is again set in Tailorstown, the same fictional village as The Misremembered Man. It was published on 27 August 2013 by Lake Union Publishing. To date it has sold over 150,000 copies. The third novel in the series, The Godforsaken Daughter, was published on 17 March 2015, by Lake Union Publishing and became a bestseller in the US, UK and Australia. McKenna's fourth novel, The Spinster Wife, was published on 12 October 2017 by Lake Union Publishing. It is a psychological thriller set in Northern Ireland.

McKenna's first novel, The Misremembered Man, was rejected by a succession of publishers in Ireland and the UK so she attempted to have it published in the USA. In 2009 the hardback version was published by The Toby Press in Connecticut. The publishing house ceased trading in 2010, however the novel's fate was saved by Amazon Encore, who published the paperback version in May 2011.

McKenna has also been involved in a theatre version of The Misremembered Man in 2013.

Her eighth novel, Mrs Purboy Takes a Chance, was published in April 2023.
