= Hugh McFadden (poet) =

Irish poet, literary editor, lecturer and freelance journalist

Hugh McFadden is an Irish poet, literary editor, lecturer and freelance journalist.

== Early life ==
McFadden was born in Derry, where he lived very briefly, and then moved to County Donegal, Republic of Ireland, his father's birthplace, before moving to Dublin. There he was educated at the Synge Street CBS and at University College Dublin (UCD), where he studied English, History and Political Science, before taking a BA (Hons) degree in History and Politics.

He earned an MA degree in Modern History at UCD and was a Tutor in the History Department there in the 1960s and early 1970s; he later taught Politics at UCD. He has also lectured in journalism at the Dublin Institute of Technology (DIT).

== Career ==
For many years McFadden was a journalist and sub-editor at The Irish Press. At one point he was Assistant Chief Sub-Editor to the novelist John Banville's Chief Sub-Editor. He regularly reviewed books for the Press Group of papers, as well as Hibernia magazine, the Irish Independent, The Irish Times and the Sunday Tribune. Currently, he reviews for the magazine Books Ireland.

He was a History Researcher with The Irish Manuscripts Commission. He also worked as an Editorial Assistant on The Correspondence of Daniel O'Connell (8 volumes).

He is the executor of the literary estate of John Jordan. He has edited Jordan's Collected Poems (Dedalus Press, 1991), Collected Stories (Poolbeg Press, 1991), Selected Prose: Crystal Clear (Lilliput Press, Dublin, 2006). He also published The Selected Poems of John Jordan (Dedalus Press, February 2008).

Six collections of his own poems have been published, the most recent being Key To The Highway: Collected Poems (Revival Press, Limerick, 2024); Further On Up the Road (Revival Press, Limerick, 2020; and Empire of Shadows (Salmon Poetry, 2012). Lagan Press, of Belfast, published his Selected Poems, Elegies and Epiphanies, in 2005. His previous collections are: Cities of Mirrors (Beaver Row Press, Dublin, 1984), and Pieces of Time (Lapwing Publications, Belfast, 2004). Empire of Shadows develops and interrogates themes of war and peace first examined in his Selected Poems. Some of the verses look at the effects of carpet-bombing of cities in the Second World War, the destruction by atomic bombs of Hiroshima and Nagasaki, the Blitz in London, the targeting of German cities by Britain's Bomber Command, the fire-bombing of Tokyo, as well as the mass violence of more recent conflicts in Iraq and Afghanistan. In 2020 the Limerick-based publishing house Revival Press published his fifth collection of poems entitled Further On Up the Road. This publishing house produced his Collected Poems in June 2024, launching it in Rathmines Library, Dublin, on June 6th, 2024.

In May, 2019, The Limerick Writers Centre published McFadden's Selected Prose, entitled Organic Words, a compilation of essays, newspaper articles, reviews and magazine pieces written over a literary and journalistic career of 50 years. Among the magazines and newspapers in which these pieces of prose were published were: Books Ireland, Broadsheet, Cyphers, The Dictionary of Irish Biography, Irish Book Review, Irish University Review, Poetry Ireland Review, The Stony Thursday Book, Hibernia, The Irish Independent, The Irish Press, The Sunday Press and The Sunday Tribune.

== Works ==
- Cities of Mirrors, Beaver Row Press (Dublin, 1984)
- Pieces of Time, Lapwing Publications (Belfast, 2004)
- Elegies & Epiphanies, Lagan Press (Belfast, 2005)
- Empire of Shadows, Salmon Poetry (Cliffs of Moher, 2012)
- Organic Words: Selected Prose, Limerick Writers Centre (Limerick, Ireland, 2019)
- Further On Up the Road, Revival Press (Limerick, 2020)
- Key To The Highway: Collected Poems, Revival Press (Limerick, 2024)

== As editor ==
- The Collected Poems of John Jordan, Dedalus Press (Dublin, 1991)
- The Collected Stories of John Jordan, Poolbeg Press (Dublin, 1991)
- Crystal Clear: Selected Prose of John Jordan, Lilliput Press (Dublin, 2006)
- Selected Poems. John Jordan, Dedalus Press (Dublin, 2008)

== See also ==
- Elysium
