= KPMG Children's Books Ireland Awards =

Award

- Sponsored by: KPMG
- Country: Ireland
- Formerly called: CBI Book of the Year Awards; Bisto Book of the Year Awards
- Website: childrensbooksireland.ie

The KPMG Children's Books Ireland Awards, previously known as the CBI Book of the Year Awards (Irish: Duaiseanna Leabhair na Bliana CBI) and the Bisto Book of the Year Awards, are literary awards presented annually in the Republic of Ireland to writers and illustrators of books for children and young people. The Awards are run by Children's Books Ireland (CBI) and are open to authors and illustrators born or resident in Ireland; books may be written in English or Irish. Many bestselling, internationally renowned authors have won a "Bisto", including Eoin Colfer, John Boyne and several times winner Kate Thompson.

The awards were sponsored by Bisto (Premier Foods) from their inception.

First awarded in 1990 (with the Book of the Decade Awards), there are currently seven prizes awarded:

- The KPMG Children's Books Ireland Book of the Year Award
- Honour Award for Fiction
- Honour Award for Illustration
- Eilís Dillon Award (for a first children's book) - named in honour of writer Eilís Dillon
- The Judges' Special Award
- The Junior Juries' Award (previously the Children’s Choice Award)
- The Reading Hero Award (awarded from 2020 onwards) - presented to a young reader, recognising their potential and celebrating their remarkable passion for books

Previously the winner of Book of the Year won a perpetual trophy and €10,000; the 3 winners of the Merit Awards (the Honour Award for Illustration, the Honour Award for Writing, the Judges' Special Recognition Award) shared a combined prize fund of €6,000; the Eilís Dillon Award winner for first time writers also won a trophy and €3,000. Currently there is a €6,000 prize for the Children’s Book of the Year and a €2,000 prize each for the Honour Award for Fiction, the Honour Award for Illustration, the Eilís Dillon Award, The Judges' Special Award, and The Junior Juries' Award.

In 2010, the Children's Choice award was introduced to mark the 20th anniversary of the Bisto Book of the Year Awards. It was chosen by 10 Junior Juries from all around Ireland, and was awarded to Jane Mitchell's Chalkline. The Judges' Special Recognition Award was not awarded in 2010.

== Past winners ==
Source: Children's Books Ireland

=== Book of the Year Award ===
Year	Title	Author	Publisher
2026	Don't Trust Fish!	Neil Sharpson and Dan Santat	Andersen Press
2025	Fia and the Last Snow Deer	Eilish Fisher and Dermot Flynn	Penguin
2024	Catfish Rolling	Clara Kumagai	Bloomsbury
2023	Girls Who Slay Monsters	Ellen Ryan and Shona Shirley Macdonald	HarperCollins Children's Books
2022	Gut Feelings	C.G. Moore	UCLan
2021	Savage Her Reply	Deirdre Sullivan and Karen Vaughan	Little Island Books
2020	Nóinín	Máire Zepf	Cois Life
2019	Flying Tips for Flightless Birds	Kelly McCaughrain	Walker Books
2018	Tangleweed and Brine	Deirdre Sullivan and Karen Vaughan	Little Island Books
2017	Goodnight Everyone	Chris Haughton	Walker Books
2016	One	Sarah Crossan	Bloomsbury Publishing
2015	Once Upon an Alphabet: Short Stories for All the Letters	Oliver Jeffers	Philomel
2014	Hagwitch	Marie-Louise Fitzpatrick	Orion Children's Books
2013	Grounded	Sheena Wilkinson	Little Island Books
2012	Into the Grey	Celine Kiernan	O'Brien Press
2011	A Bit Lost	Chris Haughton	Walker Books
2010	There	Marie-Louise Fitzpatrick	Roaring Book Press
2009	Bog Child	Siobhán Dowd	David Fickling
2008	The London Eye Mystery	Siobhán Dowd	David Fickling
2007	The Boy in the Striped Pyjamas	John Boyne	David Fickling
2006	The New Policeman	Kate Thompson	The Bodley Head
2005	Annan Water	Kate Thompson	The Bodley Head
2004	Wings Over Delft	Aubrey Flegg	O'Brien Press
2003	You, Me and the Big Blue Sea	Marie-Louise Fitzpatrick	Gullane
2003	The Alchemist's Apprentice	Kate Thompson	The Bodley Head
2002	The Beguilers	Kate Thompson	The Bodley Head
2001	Izzy and Skunk	Marie-Louise Fitzpatrick	Blackwater Press
2000	Faraway Home	Marilyn Taylor	O'Brien Press
1999	Tales of Wisdom and Wonder	Niamh Sharkey	Barefoot Books
1998	Dream Invader	Gerard Whelan	O'Brien Press
1997	Sisters ... No Way!	Siobhán Parkinson	O'Brien Press
1996	The Christmas Miracle of Jonathan Toomey	P. J. Lynch	Poolbeg Press
1995	Blaeberry Sunday	Elizabeth O'Hara (Éilís Ní Dhuibhne)	Poolbeg Press
1994	When Stars Stop Spinning	Jane Mitchell	Poolbeg Press
1993	The Blue Horse	Marita Conlon-McKenna	O'Brien Press
1992	The Summer of Lily and Esme	John Quinn	Poolbeg Press
1991	The Island of Ghosts	Eilís Dillon	Faber and Faber

=== Merit Awards ===
Year	Title	Winner	Publisher
2018	Chocolate Cake	Kevin Waldron, illustrator	Puffin Books
2018	Star by Star	Sheena Wilkinson	Little Island Books
2018	Illegal	Eoin Colfer	Hodder
2017	Goodnight Everyone	Chris Haughton, illustrator	Walker Books
2017	Needlework	Deirdre Sullivan	Little Island Books
2017	Bliain na nAmhrán	Tadhg Mac Dhonnagáin, Jennifer Farley, Brian Fitzpatrick, Tarsila Krüse, Christina O'Donovan	Futa Futa
2016	Gulliver	Lauren O'Neill, illustrator	The O'Brien Press
2016	Asking For It	Louise O'Neill	Quercus
2016	Irelandopedia	Fatti Burke & John Burke	Gill
2015	Shh! We Have a Plan	Chris Haughton, illustrator	Candlewick Press
2015	Daideo	Áine Ní Ghlinn	Cois Life
2015	Haiku más é do thoil é!	Gabriel Rosenstock & Brian Fitzgerald	An Gúm
2014	The Mysterious Traveller	P. J. Lynch	Walker Books
2014	The Sleeping Baobab Tree	Paula Leyden	Walker Books
2014	The Day the Crayons Quit	Oliver Jeffers, illustrator	HarperCollins
2013	This Moose Belongs to Me	Oliver Jeffers	HarperCollins
2013	Dark Warning	Marie-Louise Fitzpatrick	Orion
2013	Hóng	Anna Heussaff	Cló lar-Chonnacht
2012	Stuck	Oliver Jeffers	HarperCollins
2012	The Butterfly Heart	Paula Leyden	Walker Books
2012	Maitríóisce	Siobhán Parkinson	Cois Life
2011	The Heart and the Bottle	Oliver Jeffers	Philomel
2011	Mac Rí Eireann	Andrew Whitson	New Island Books
2011	Taking Flight	Sheena Wilkinson	Walker Books
2010	Solace of the Road	Siobhán Dowd	David Fickling
2010	There	Marie-Louise Fitzpatrick	Roaring Book Press
2010	Chalkline	Jane Mitchell	Walker Books
2009	Highway Robbery	Kate Thompson	The Bodley Head
2009	The Great Paper Caper	Oliver Jeffers	HarperCollins
2009	Creature of the Night	Kate Thompson	The Bodley Head
2008	The Black Book of Secrets	F. E. Higgins	Macmillan
2008	The Way Back Home	Oliver Jeffers	HarperCollins
2008	Wilderness	Roddy Doyle	Scholastic
2007	The Incredible Book-Eating Boy	Oliver Jeffers	HarperCollins
2007	Hurlamaboc	Éilís Ní Dhuibhne	Cois Life
2007	Something Invisible	Siobhán Parkinson	Penguin
2006	Lost and Found	Oliver Jeffers	HarperCollins
2006	A Horse Called El Dorado	Kevin Kiely	O'Brien Press
2006	Penny the Pencil	Eileen O'Hely	Mercier Press
2005	Something Beginning with P	Corrina Askin, Alan Clarke and Emma Byrne	O'Brien Press
2005	How to Catch a Star	Oliver Jeffers	HarperCollins
2005	The Gods and their Machines	Oisín McGann	O'Brien Press
2004	Origins	Kate Thompson	The Bodley Head
2004	You Can Do It Sam	Anita Jeram	Walker Books
2004	The Ravenous Beast	Niamh Sharkey	Walker Books
2003	Fox	Matthew Sweeney and Colmán Ó Raghallaigh	Bloomsbury
2003	An Tóraíocht	The Cartoon Saloon	Cló Mhaigh Eo
2003	War Children	Gerard Whelan	O'Brien Press
2002	Artemis Fowl	Eoin Colfer	Puffin
2002	Caught on a Train	Carlo Gébler	Egmont
2002	An Sclábhaí	Colmán Ó Raghallaigh	Cló Mhaigh Eo
2001	The Wish List	Eoin Colfer	O'Brien Press
2001	Dirt Tracks	Martina Murphy	Poolbeg Press
2001	The Orchard Book of Ghostly Stories	Martin Waddell	Orchard Press
2000	Siúloid Bhreá	Mary Arrigan	An Gúm
2000	Fierce Milly	Marilyn McLaughlin	Egmont
2000	Silent Stones	Mark O'Sullivan	Wolfhound Press
1999	The Long March	Marie-Louise Fitzpatrick	Wolfhound Press
1999	The Moon King	Siobhán Parkinson	O'Brien Press
1999	An Rógaire agus a Scáil	Gabriel Rosenstock	An Gúm
1998	The Hungry Wind	Soinbhe Lally	Poolbeg Press
1998	When Jessie Came Across the Sea	P. J. Lynch	Poolbeg Press
1998	Four Kids, Three Cats, Two Cows, One Witch (maybe)	Siobhán Parkinson	O'Brien Press
1997	An Eala Dubh	Cliodhna Cussen and Cormac Ó Snodaigh	Coiscéim
1997	The Lantern Moon	Maeve Friel	Poolbeg Press
1997	The Guns of Easter	Gerard Whelan	O'Brien Press
1996	Hannah or Pink Balloons	Mary Beckett	Marino Books
1996	Sceoin sa Bhoireann	Ré Ó Laighléis	Cló Iar-Chonnachta
1996	Lockie and Dadge	Frank Murphy	O'Brien Press
1995	Goodbye Summer, Goodbye	Rose Doyle	Attic Press
1995	Catkin	P. J. Lynch	Poolbeg Press
1995	Ecstasy agus Scéalta Eile	Ré Ó Laighléis	Cló Iar-Chonnachta
1994	The Chieftain's Daughter	Sam McBratney	O'Brien Press
1994	The Hiring Fair	Elizabeth O'Hara (Éilís Ní Dhuibhne)	Poolbeg Press
1994	The Pony Express	Máirín Johnston	Attic Press

=== Éilís Dillon Award for a First Children's Book ===
Year	Title	Author	Publisher
2023	The Book of Secrets	Alex Dunne	O'Brien Press
2022	Rescuing Titanic: A True Story of Quiet Bravery in the North Atlantic	Flora Delargy	Wide Eyed Editions
2021	Why the Moon Travels	Oein DeBhairduin and Leanne McDonagh	Skein Press
2020	Mór agus Muilc	Kim Sharkey	Éabhlóid
2019	Flying Tips for Flightless Birds	Kelly McCaughrain	Walker Books
2018	The Space Between	Meg Grehan	Little Island Books
2017	The Ministry of Strange, Unusual and Impossible Things	Paul Gamble	Little Island Books
2016	Irelandopedia	Fatti Burke & John Burke	Gill
2015	Only Ever Yours	Louise O'Neill	Quercus
2014	Not awarded		
2013	The Weight of Water	Sarah Crossan	Bloomsbury
2012	The Butterfly Heart	Paula Leyden	Walker
2011	A Bit Lost	Chris Haughton	Walker
2010	The Third Pig Detective Agency	Bob Burke	HarperCollins
2009	Anila's Journey	Mary Finn	Walker Books
2008	The Thing With Finn	Tom Kelly	Macmillan
2007	A Swift Pure Cry	Siobhán Dowd	David Fickling
2006	Snakes' Elbows	Deirdre Madden	Orchard Books
2005	An Bhó Riabhach	Siobhán Ní Shíthigh	An Gúm
2004	Amach	Alan Titley	An Gúm
2003	Gyrfalcon	Grace Wells	O'Brien Press
2002	Adam's Starling	Gillian Perdue	O'Brien Press
2001	The Lost Orchard	Patrick Deeley	O'Brien Press
2000	Fierce Milly	Marilyn McLaughlin	Egmont
1999	Dea-Scéala	Caitríona Hastings	Cló Iar-Chonnachta
1998	It's a Jungle Out There	Ed Miliano	Wolfhound Press
1997	The Guns of Easter	Gerard Whelan	O'Brien Press
1996	Lockie and Dadge	Frank Murphy	O'Brien Press
1995	Melody for Nora	Mark O'Sullivan	Wolfhound Press

=== Awards in discontinued categories ===
- Best Emerging Author (1991) – Brian Boru by Morgan Llywelyn, O'Brien Press
- Book for Young Readers (1991) – Grandma's Bill by Martin Waddell, Simon & Schuster
- Illustration (1991) – Fairy Tales of Ireland by P. J. Lynch, Collins
- Historical Fiction (1992) – Wildflower Girl by Marita Conlon-McKenna, O'Brien Press
- Picture Book (1992) – The Sleeping Giant by Marie-Louise Fitzpatrick, Brandon Books
- First Children's Novel (1992) – The Secret of the Ruby Ring by Yvonne MacGrory, Children's Press
- Information Book (1993) – Tamall sa Chistin by Mairin Uí Chomain, An Gúm
- Teenage Fiction (1993) – Put a Saddle on the Pig by Sam McBratney, Methuen
- Historical Fiction (1993) – Strongbow by Morgan Llywelyn, O'Brien Press

== Bisto Children's Book of the Decade (1980–1990) ==
Fiction: Run with the Wind; Run to Earth; Run Swift; Run Free by Tom McCaughren, Jeanette Dunne (Wolfhound Press)

Information Books: Exploring the Book of Kells: Brendan the Navigator by George Otto Simms, David Rooney (O'Brien Press)

Books for Young Readers: Grandma's Bill by Martin Waddell, illus. Jane Johnson (Simon & Schuster)

Irish Language: An Chanáil by Marie-Louise Fitzpatrick, transl. Bernadine Nic Ghiolla Phádraig An Gúm

== Winners of multiple awards ==
- Most Bisto Book of the Year Awards: Kate Thompson (4), Marie-Louise Fitzpatrick (4), Siobhán Dowd (2), Chris Haughton (2)
- Most Merit Awards: Oliver Jeffers (9), Kate Thompson (3), P. J. Lynch (3)
- Most Bisto Awards (total): Oliver Jeffers (10), Marie-Louise Fitzpatrick (10), Kate Thompson (7), P. J. Lynch (5), Gerard Whelan (4), Siobhán Dowd (4), Chris Haughton (4), Siobhán Parkinson (3), Éilis Ni Dhuibhne/Elizabeth O'Hara (3)
