= P. J. Lynch =

Irish artist and children's book illustrator

P.J. Lynch
- Born: Patrick James Lynch; 2 March 1962 (age 64); Belfast, Northern Ireland
- Occupations: Artist; Illustrator; Author
- Children: 3
- Writing career
- Years active: 1984—present
- Genre: Children's books
- Notable awards: Kate Greenaway Medal; Christopher Award
- Website: www.pjlynchgallery.com

Patrick James Lynch (born 2 March 1962), known professionally as P. J. Lynch, is an Irish artist and illustrator of children's books. He has won a number of awards, including two Kate Greenaway Medals and three Christopher Awards. His most successful book, The Christmas Miracle of Jonathan Toomey by Susan Wojciechowski, has sold more than a million copies in the United States alone.

== Early life ==
Lynch was born in Belfast, Northern Ireland in 1962 as the youngest of five children to a Catholic family. His mother's family was from Dunloy, County Antrim and the family often spent their summers there. Lynch was interested in art from an early age and spent his free time drawing on any scrap of paper he could find. He credits one of his three brothers, Denis, as who inspired him to start drawing. He recalls that Belfast during The Troubles was a "scary" place for a teenager, and he used drawing and reading as a "way of escaping for a while from the horrors that were happening around me in the real world."

As a child, he thought his drawing skills could be applied to a career in architecture but lost interest in his early teens. He attended St. Malachy's College for secondary school. Both his parents were very supportive of his decision to pursue art school. and he continued on to Brighton College of Art, where he was tutored by Raymond Briggs. At the time, Briggs headed the illustration department and encouraged Lynch to pursue a career as an illustrator, which he did upon graduating in 1984.

== Career ==
=== Book illustrations ===
Lynch's first illustrated book was A Bag of Moonshine by Alan Garner (1986), a collection of folklore tales from England and Wales. In 1987, he was presented with the Mother Goose Award, which recognises the "most exciting newcomer to British children's book illustration." Since then, folklore and other traditional stories, legends, and fairytales, have been regular subjects in his work.

Susan Wojciechowski's book The Christmas Miracle of Jonathan Toomey has been considered a Christmas classic since selling out within three weeks of its first publication in 1995. Lynch initially turned down the opportunity to illustrate the book, afraid he would not do it justice, but later changed his mind. He dedicated himself so deeply to the story that he hired actors to help create a world he could put on paper. The book won both Lynch's first Kate Greenaway Medal and his first Christopher Award. According to WorldCat, more than 3,096 member libraries worldwide own at least one copy of Jonathan Toomey.

Lynch won his second Greenaway Medal in 1997 and his second Christopher Award in 1998 for illustrating When Jessie Came Across the Sea by Amy Hest. His third Christopher Award came from Grandad's Prayers of the Earth by Douglas Wood in 2009. In 2014, he won the Bisto Book of the Year Honour Award for Illustration for Mysterious Traveller by Mal Peet and Elspeth Graham. He has also been nominated twice (2010, 2014) for the Hans Christian Andersen Award. In 2016, he was named the fourth Laureate na nÓg, following Siobhan Parkinson, Niamh Sharkey, and Eoin Colfer.

=== Other media ===
Lynch has worked in a number of areas other than illustrations for children's books, including creating posters for Opera Ireland and for the Abbey Theatre's 2016 production of The Importance of Being Earnest. He has designed a number of stamps for An Post, including Christmas sets and individual stamps inspired by books such as Gulliver's Travels and The Happy Prince. He was commissioned by Cavan County Library for two large oil paintings inspired by Gulliver's Travels to hang in their entrance. As with Jonathan Toomey, Lynch acted out the characters in his library paintings to get a better sense of their world. In 2020, he designed a 14 metre by 14 metre, 1.5 million-piece mosaic featuring the Virgin Mary for Knock Basilica in County Mayo.

Lynch also lectures and holds workshops at galleries (e.g., the National Gallery of Ireland), conferences, events (e.g., Irish Film Institute's Family Festival), and colleges (e.g., the Long Room at Trinity College Dublin. As Laureate na nÓg, he hosted a video podcast series called The Big Picture! featuring drawing techniques. In 2019, he was commissioned by the Royal Mint to design the Year of the Rat (2020) coin in the Mint's Shēngxiào Collection. In 2021, he was again chosen to create a coin, this time featuring a woman of colour; he chose to draw Britannia as a Black woman.

Despite not initially being interested in writing, Lynch has published two books: The Boy Who Fell Off the Mayflower, or John Howland's Good Fortune (2015) and The Haunted Lake (2020).

=== Style ===
Lynch illustrates using mainly watercolors and gouache and illustrations are considered painterly. They are typically colorful, detailed, and realistic, and are lauded for their "exceptional range of texture and colour" Each of Lynch's works begins with him reading and rereading the story until he gets a sense of what he wants to draw; he then produces rough sketches that he can later polish and turn into a final product. He tries to avoid using too many digital programs "in case they get too slick" and, while he already has a distinctive, traditional style, he is open to trying new techniques such as the "charcoal and chalk rubbing" he did for The Boy Who Fell Off the Mayflower.

Research plays a large part in Lynch's creative process and he has been known to act out or hire actors to play characters in the story so he can get a visual sense of the scene he wants to capture. Historical accuracy and cultural respect are important enough to him that, while illustrating Jessie Came Across the Sea, he consulted the Jewish Museum in New York City to ensure he was correctly depicting Jewish immigrant life. For stories centering on humans, Lynch often relies on photographs and his actors wearing historically accurate garb to help visualise body language, but rarely uses this method when working with fairytales and folklore.

Lynch was influenced by Arthur Rackham and Edmund Dulac in his early years, and later Maxfield Parrish, NC Wyeth, Norman Rockwell, Alan Lee, Gennady Spirin, and Brian Selznick.

== Personal life ==
Lynch and his three children live in Dublin. His second cousin is playwright Martin Lynch.

== Published works ==
=== As author ===
Year	Title	Publisher	Age	Genre	ISBN	References
2015	The Boy Who Fell Off the Mayflower, or John Howland's Good Luck	Candlewick Press	Middle-grade	Historical	978-0763665845	
2020	The Haunted Lake	Candlewick Press	Middle-grade	Folklore	978-1536200133	

=== As illustrator ===
Year	Title	Author	Publisher	Genre	Pages	Awards	Notes	ISBN	References
1986	A Bag of Moonshine	Alan Garner	HarperCollins	Folklore	144	Mother Goose Award (1987)	Collection of folkloric stories	978-0385295178	
1987	Johnny Reed's Cat and Other Northern Tales	Kathleen Hersom	A & C Black	Folklore	79			978-0713627732	
1987	Moondial	Helen Cresswell	Faber and Faber	Fantasy	214			978-0571148059	
1988	The Raggy Taggy Toys	Joyce Dunbar	Orchard Books	Magic	30			978-1852130343	
1988	Melisande	E. Nesbit	Walker Books	Fairytale	37		Illustrated collection published 64 years after Nesbit's death		
1990	Stories for Children	Oscar Wilde	Simon & Schuster	Fairytale	94		Illustrated collection published 90 years after Wilde's death		
1990	Fairy Tales from Ireland	William Butler Yeats	HarperCollins	Fairytale	160		Illustrated collection published 59 years after Yeats' death		
1991	East O' the Sun and West O' the Moon	Peter Christen Asbjørnsen and Jørgen Moe	Walker Books	Fairytale	40		Illustrated version published 106 years after Asbjørnsen's death, 109 years after Moe's		
1991	The Steadfast Tin Soldier	Hans Christian Andersen	Andersen Press	Fairytale	30		Illustrated version published 116 years after Andersen's death		
1992	Forbidden Doors	Susan Price	Faber and Faber	Fantasy					
1993	The Candlewick Book of Fairy Tales	Sarah Hayes	Candlewick Press	Fairytale	92		Collection of classic fairytales	978-1564022608	
1993	The Snow Queen	Hans Christian Andersen	Andersen Press	Fairytale	48		Illustrated version published 118 years after Andersen's death	978-0862644130	
1994	Catkin	Antonia Barber	Walker Press	Fairytale	41	Shorted listed for 1994 Greenaway Medal			
1995	The Christmas Miracle of Jonathan Toomey	Susan Wojciechowski	Walker Press	Christmas fiction	40	Winner of Greenaway Medal and Christopher Award			
1996	Boy in Darkness	Mervyn Peake	Hodder Children's Books	Fantasy	114		Illustrated version published 28 years after Peake's death	978-0340683231	
1996	The King of Ireland's Son	Brendan Behan	Andersen Press	Fairytale	31		Illustrated version published 32 years after Behan's death	978-0862646936	
1997	Favourite Fairy Tales	Sarah Hayes	Walker Press	Fairytale	92		Collection compiled by Sarah Hayes		
1997	When Jessie Came Across the Sea	Amy Hest	Walker Press	Historical	40	Winner of 1997 Greenaway Medal and 1998 Christopher Award			
1999	Grandad's Prayers of the Earth	Douglas Wood	Walker Press	Bereavement	28	Winner of Christopher Award		978-0744556483	
1999	Alphabet Gallery: An ABC Of Contemporary Illustrators	Gina Pollinger (editor)	Mammoth Publications		55			978-0749740450	
2000	The Names Upon the Harp	Marie Heaney	Faber and Faber	Folklore	95		Collection of Irish legends	978-0571193639	
2001	Ignis	Gina Wilson	Walker Press	Fantasy	38			978-0744575286	
2002	A Witch in Time	Terry Deary	A & C Black	Fantasy	72			978-0713662023	
2003	The Bee-Man of Orn	Frank R. Stockton	Walker Press	Fantasy	48		Illustrated version published 101 years after Stockton's death	978-1844285068	
2006	A Christmas Carol	Charles Dickens	Candlewick Press	Christmas fiction	156		Published 136 years after Dickens' death	978-0763631208	
2008	The Gift of the Magi	O. Henry	Candlewick Press	Christmas fiction	40		Published 98 years after Henry's death	978-0763635305	
2009	The Nutcracker	Simon Stewart (adaptor)	W5 LTD	Christmas	40			978-0956383402	
2009	Lincoln and His Boys	Rosemary Wells	Candlewick Press	Historical	96			978-0763637231	
2010	The Story of Britain	Patrick Dillon & Martha Dillon	Walker Press	Historical	340			978-1406311921	
2011	No One But You	Douglas Wood	Candlewick Press	Nature	32			978-0763638481	
2013	Mysterious Traveler	Mal Peet & Elspeth Graham	Candlewick Press		48			978-0763662325	
2013	Fields of Home	Marita Conlon-McKenna	O'Brien Press	Historical	192		Part of the Children of the Famine Trilogy	978-1847176028	
2014	The Snow Globe: Beyond the Stars	Marita Conlon-McKenna	HarperCollins	Fantasy	50			978-0008103378	
2015	Once Upon a Place	Eoin Colfer (editor)	Little Island	Poetry, Ireland	208		Collection of 6 poems and 11 short stories from Irish authors	978-1910411377	
2017	Patrick and the President	Ryan Tubridy	Candlewick Press	Historical	40			978-0763689490	
2021	The Dog Who Lost His Bark	Eoin Colfer	Candlewick Press	Animals	144			978-1536219173	
2021	'Twas the Night Before Christmas	Clement Clarke Moore	Candlewick Press	Christmas	32		Illustrated gift edition published 158 years after Moore's death	978-1536222852	
2023	Three Tasks for a Dragon	Eoin Colfer	Walker Books	Fantasy	112			978-1529505825	

== See also ==
Cultural offices
Preceded by Eoin Colfer	Laureate na nÓg; 2016–2018	Succeeded by Sarah Crossan
