= Sisters ... No Way! =

1996 young adult novel by Siobhán Parkinson

Sisters... No Way!
- Author: Siobhán Parkinson
- Illustrator: Laura Cronin
- Language: English
- Genre: Fiction
- Publisher: O'Brien Press
- Publication date: 1996
- Publication place: Ireland
- Pages: 219
- ISBN: 9780862784959
- OCLC: 504542977

Sisters... No Way! is a young adult novel by the Irish author Siobhán Parkinson, first published in 1996. It is a two-sided book, written in the form of the diaries of two teenagers who become reluctant stepsisters through their parents' marriage.

The book won the Bisto Children's Books in Ireland Book of the Year in 1997.
