= Laureate na nÓg =

Children's Laureate of Ireland

Laureate na nÓg is a position awarded in Ireland once every three years to a writer or illustrator of children's books. It was set up by the Arts Council of Ireland in 2010 and is managed on behalf of the council by Children's Books Ireland. It is intended "to engage young people with high quality children's literature and to underline the importance of children's literature in our cultural and imaginative life".

Siobhán Parkinson was the first Laureate.

Chris Haughton was announced as 8th Laureate na nÓg on 11 May 2026. He will hold the position until 2029.

== History ==
Siobhán Parkinson, described by The Irish Times as "one of Ireland's foremost children's writers", was announced as the first holder of the post on 10 May 2010. President of Ireland Mary McAleese revealed the news at an event held at the Irish Arts Council in Dublin and presented Parkinson with the silver Laureate na nÓg medal.

Parkinson announced one of her main aims was that "every child in the country has access to a nice, bright, warm, cheerful, comfortable library, where they can go and find the books that will open their minds and bring them into wonderful imaginary places". One of Parkinson's first requests was an appeal to the Government of Ireland for the restoration of school library system funding which it had removed due to cuts.

== List of position holders ==
Years	Author
2010–2012	Siobhán Parkinson
2012–2014	Niamh Sharkey
2014–2016	Eoin Colfer
2016–2018	P. J. Lynch
2018–2020	Sarah Crossan
2020-2023	Áine Ní Ghlinn
2023-2026	Patricia Forde
2026-2029	Chris Haughton

== See also ==
- Children's Laureate
