= Under the Hawthorn Tree =

Under the Hawthorn Tree may refer to:

- Under the Hawthorn Tree (film), 2010 Chinese film directed by Zhang Yimou
- Under the Hawthorn Tree (novel), children's novel by Irish author Marita Conlon-McKenna
