= Deirdre Sullivan =

Children's writer and poet

Deirdre Sullivan is an Irish children's writer and poet.

== Early life and education ==
Sullivan was born in Galway. Sullivan went to college and became a teacher working with autistic children. She now lives in Ranelagh in Dublin. Sullivan took a course with Siobhán Parkinson who taught creative writing at Colaiste Mhuire, Marino, Dublin. Her lecturer commissioned her to write her first book. Several of her books have been shortlisted for awards and Tangleweed and Brine won the 28th CBI Book of the Year Awards, written with illustrator Karen Vaughan. Sullivan's first play Wake debuted in Galway in February 2019.

Her young adult novel Savage Her Reply (2020) was included among the 41 titles selected for the 2024 USBBY Outstanding International Books List.

In 2021, her story, Little Lives won 'Short Story of the Year' at the Irish Book Awards.

== Bibliography ==
- Prim Improper, Little Island, 2010
- The Nightmare Club 1: Help! My Brother is a Zombie!, Little Island, 2010
- The Nightmare Club 2: Guinea Pig Killer, Little Island, 2010
- The Nightmare Club 3: The Hatching, Little Island 2012
- Seeing Red, Watching My Hands at Work: A festschrift for Adrian Frazier, Salmon Poetry 2013
- Improper Order, Little Island, 2013
- Primperfect, Little Island, 2014
- Needlework, Little Island, 2016
- Tangleweed and Brine, Little Island, 2017
- Perfectly Preventable Deaths, Hot Key, 2019
- Savage Her Reply, Little Island, 2020
- I Want To Know That I will Be Okay, Banshee Press, 2021
- Precious Catastrophe (Perfectly Preventable Deaths 2), Hot Key, 2021
- Weave, collaboration with Oein DeBharduin and Yingge Xu (Illustrator), Skein Press, 2022
- Wise Creatures, Hot Key, 2023
- Little Passenger, collaboration with illustrator Jessica Love, Walker Picture Books, 2026
