= Sarah Crossan =

Irish writer

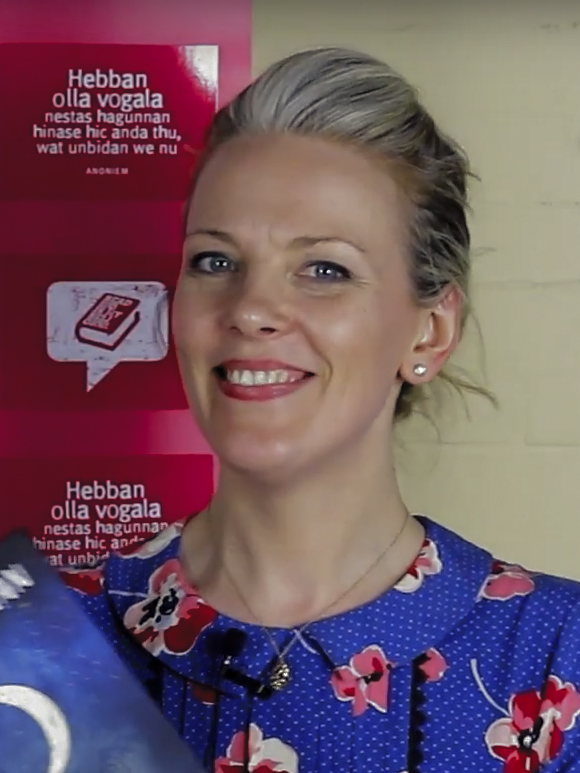
- Sarah Crossan in 2018
- Born: London, England
- Occupation: Author
- Genre: Youth adult fiction
- Notable works: The Weight of Water; Apple and Rain; One

Sarah Crossan is an Irish author. She is best known for her books for young adults, including Apple and Rain and One, for which she has won several awards.

== Life and career ==
Crossan was born in London and grew up in Churchtown, Dublin. Her father was an architect and her mother was a homemaker. She has three brothers.

Crossan graduated from University of Warwick in 1999 with a degree in Philosophy and Literature and later obtained a master's degree in Creative Writing. She received an Edward Albee Fellowship for writing in 2010. Crossan trained as an English and drama teacher at the University of Cambridge.

In May 2018, she was appointed Laureate na nÓg, or Irish Children's laureate by President Michael D. Higgins.

In July 2025, Simon & Schuster signed a three-book deal with Crossan. Her upcoming novel Gone for Good will be published in February 2026.

== Awards ==
- 2013: shortlisted for Carnegie Medal for The Weight of Water
- 2015: shortlisted for Carnegie Medal for Apple and Rain
- 2016:
  - The Bookseller' YA Book Prize for One
  - Irish Children's Book of the Year for One
  - Carnegie Medal for One
- 2017: Red House Children's Book Award for older readers for One
- 2020: Young Adult Jury Award of the German Youth Literature Awards for the German edition of Moonrise
- 2024: Nominated for the Young Adult Jury Award of the German Youth Literature Awards for the German edition of Toffee

== Novels ==
- The Weight of Water (2012)
- Breathe (2012)
- Resist (2013) – a sequel to Breathe
- Apple and Rain (2014)
- One (2015)
- We Come Apart (2017) co-authored with Brian Conaghan
- Moonrise (2017)
- Inséparable (2017)
- Swimming Pool (2018)
- Toffee (2019)
- Here Is the Beehive (2020)
- Where the Heart Should Be (2024)
- Hey Zoey (2024)

Cultural offices
Preceded by P. J. Lynch	Laureate na nÓg; 2018–2020	Succeeded by Áine Ní Ghlinn
