= Mother Goose Award =

The Mother Goose Award was an award annually presented to "the most exciting newcomer to British children's book illustration."

It was inaugurated in 1979 and last awarded in 1999. Sponsored by Books for Children booksellers, award winners received £1,000 and a gilded goose egg. The judges included Clodagh Corcoran, Shirley Hughes, Jane Little, Colin McNaughton, Fiona Waters, Sally Grindley, Jan Ormerod, and Kathleen Gribble.

== Winners ==
Twenty illustrators were recognised in 21 years.

| Year | Illustrator | Title | distinct Author |
|---|---|---|---|
| 1979 | Michelle Cartlidge | Pippin and Pod | — |
| 1980 | Reg Cartwright | Mr Potter's Pigeon | Patrick Kinmonth |
| 1981 | Juan Wijngaard | Green Finger House | Rosemary Harris |
| 1982 | Jan Ormerod | Sunshine | — |
| 1983 | Satoshi Kitamura | Angry Arthur | Hiawyn Oram |
| 1984 | Patrick Benson | The Hob Stories | William Mayne |
| 1985 | Susan Varley | Badger's Parting Gifts | — |
| 1986 | (no award) | | |
| 1987 | P. J. Lynch | A Bag of Moonshine (British folktales retold) | Alan Garner |
| 1988 | Emma Chichester Clark | Listen to This | Laura Cecil, compiler |
| 1989 | Charles Fuge | Bush Vark's First Day Out | — |
| 1990 | David Hughes | Strat and Chatto | Jan Mark |
| 1991 | Amanda Harvey | A Close Call | — |
| 1992 | Ted Dewan | Inside the Whale and Other Animals | Steve Parker |
| 1993 | Claire Fletcher | The Seashell Song | Susie Jenkin-Pearce |
| 1994 | Lisa Flather | Where the Great Bear Watches | James Sage |
| 1995 | Flora McDonnell | I Love Animals | — |
| 1996 | Bruce Ingman | When Martha's Away | — |
| 1997 | Clare Jarrett | Catherine and the Lion | — |
| 1998 | Mary Fedden | Motley the Cat | Susannah Amoore |
| 1999 | Niamh Sharkey | The Gigantic Turnip (from The Giant Turnip, publ. 1863) | Aleksei Tolstoy |

== Collections ==
Records of the Mother Goose Award from 1978 to 1986 are held in the archives of the Institute of Education, University College London.

== See also ==
- Kate Greenaway Medal
- Kurt Maschler Award
- Gelett Burgess Children's Book Award
