= Mary Arrigan =

Irish illustrator, artist and novelist

- Born: February 15, 1943 (age 83); Newbridge, County Kildare
- Writing career
- Genre: Children's stories

Mary Arrigan (born 15 February 1943) is an Irish illustrator, artist and novelist, focusing on children's books.

== Life ==
Arrigan was born Mary Nolan in Newbridge, County Kildare on 5 February 1943 to Brendan Nolan and Marian Maher. She had one brother who went on to become a doctor. She got her education initially in Holy Family Convent, Co Kildare before going on to the National College in Dublin and University College Dublin. She married Emmet Arrigan in 1968 and they had three children. Arrigan worked as a secondary school art teacher. She exhibited as an artist for eighteen years. Arrigan began writing short stories for magazines and radio which lead to her writing full-time by 1994. Arrigan writes in both English and Irish. Her books have been translated into 10 languages.

== Awards ==
- The Sunday Times CWA Award, 1991
- The Hennessy Award, 1993
- International White Ravens Award, 1997
- Bisto Merit Award, 2000

== Bibliography ==
- Grimstone's Ghost
- Ghost Bird
- Milo and One Dead Angry Druid
- Milo and The Raging Chieftains
- Milo and the Pirate Sisters
- Milo and the Long Lost Warriors
- Esty's Gold
- The Rabbit Girl
- Seascape with Barber's Harp
- The Dwellers Beneath
- Baldur's Bones
- Hard Luck
- Chocolate Moon
- Dead Monks and Shady Deals
- Landscape with Cracked Sheep
- Larkspur and the Grand March
- Saving the Dark Planet
- Maeve and the Long Arm Folly
- Maeve and the Goodnight Trail
- The Spirits of the Bog
- The Spirits of the Attic
- Pa Jinglebob: The Fastest Knitter in the West
- Pa Jinglebob and the Grabble Gang
- Mario's Angels: A Story about the Artist Giotto
- Lá le mamó
- Mamó cois trá
- Mamó ar an Fheirm
- Mamó ag an sorcas
- An Scath Baisti
- Mac Dathó agus a chú
- Mamó ag an zú
