= Jan Ormerod =

Australian illustrator of children's books (1946 – 2013)

- Born: Janet Louise Hendry; 23 September 1946; Bunbury, Western Australia, Australia
- Died: 23 January 2013 (aged 66); Cambridge, England
- Occupation: Illustrator
- Spouse: Paul Ormerod
- Writing career
- Period: 1981–2012
- Genre: Children's picture books
- Notable works: Sunshine; Moonlight; Shake a Leg
- Notable awards: Mother Goose Award; 1982

Jan Ormerod (23 September 1946 – 23 January 2013), born Janet Louise Hendry, was an Australian illustrator of children's books. She first came to prominence from her wordless picture book Sunshine which won the 1982 Mother Goose Award. Her work was noted for its ability to remove clutter to tell a simple story that young children could enjoy, employing flat colours and clean lines. She produced work for more than 50 books throughout her career, including publications by other authors, such as a 1987 edition of J. M. Barrie's Peter Pan and David Lloyd's retelling of "The Frog Prince". Ormerod began her illustrative career in Britain after moving to England in 1980, but she returned to themes connected to her home country with Lizzie Nonsense (2004), Water Witcher (2008) and the award-winning Shake a Leg (2011) for Aboriginal writer Boori Monty Pryor.

== Career ==
Janet Louise Hendry was born in 1946, the youngest of four daughters, in the port city of Bunbury in Western Australia. Her childhood was spent following artistic pursuits, drawing inspiration from British schoolgirl annuals and American comics. She studied at art college in Perth, and on graduation she taught art on enrichment courses in secondary schools and later lectured at a teachers' college and art schools. She married Paul Ormerod, a children's librarian, in 1971 and after spending several years moving between Britain and Australia they settled in Cambridge in 1987. Although never planning to start a family, the birth of her first child, Sophie, Ormerod found motherhood a great boon and enjoyed the intimacy of her daughter's company. Sophie's enjoyment in the children's books her father brought home spurred Ormerod into considering illustrating her own books, which resulted in the publication of Sunshine in 1981. Sunshine was a wordless book which consisted of a series of panels following a little girl, based on her own daughter, as she wakes and prepares herself for a day at school. It won the 1982 Mother Goose Award for "the most exciting newcomer to British children's book illustration". Sunshine was also voted Australian Picture Book of the Year.

A panel from Sunshine (1981) showing Ormerod's clean lines and uncluttered style.

Ormerod followed Sunshine with Moonlight (1982), a companion book following the same child as she prepares herself for bed. Many of Ormerod's early work concentrated on family life and in 1985 she started the Jan Ormerod Baby Book series beginning with Sleeping and Dad's Back. These books explored the relationship between infant and father. These were followed by the Jan Ormerod New Baby Book (1987), this time focusing on a child and her pregnant mother, which mirrored Ormerod's own situation when she was pregnant with her second daughter, Laura. In 1987 she provided illustration for a reissue of J. M. Barrie's Peter Pan, published by Viking Kestrel in 1988.

Despite Ormerod and Paul divorcing in 1989, they remained good friends and Ormerod remained in Cambridge, close to her publisher Walker Books. In the 1980s she began a close working relationship with writer David Lloyd, who later became the chairman of Walker, and in 1991 they published a retelling of The Frog Prince that she illustrated. The 1990s also saw Ormerod working with Penelope Lively on her book Two Bears and Joe. In 2003 she wrote her first book to which she did not lend illustrations; If You're Happy And You Know It! was illustrated by Lindsey Gardiner, an artist she would work with on three other books over the next ten years. In her later career she began working on several works based around the Australian Outback. Her 2004 book Lizzie Nonsense was dedicated to the memory of her grandmother and explored a young girl growing up in the Outback during 1890. The book contained illustrations more heavily painted then her usual subdued colours, and was well received winning the IBBY Honour Award for illustration. In 2008 she produced Water Witcher, another story set in the Australian bush, this time following the story of a small boy during a drought. During one of her last trips to her home country, she met with Aboriginal writer Boori Monty Pryor, who later became the first Australian Children's Laureate. Her drawings of his family dancing led to the two collaborating on the book Shake a Leg, which won the Australian Prime Minister's Literary Award for Children's Fiction.

Ormerod died of cancer on 23 January 2013. She was 66 and was survived by her two daughters.

== Works ==
- Sunshine (1981) – her first book
- Hairs in the Palm of the Hand (Kestrel Books, 1981) by Jan Mark – short stories LCCN 83-100565
- Moonlight (1982)
- Rhymes Around the Day (1983)
- 101 Things to Do with a Baby (1984)
- Sleeping (1985)
- Dad's Back (1985)
- Messy Baby (1985)
- Our Ollie (1986)
- The Story of Chicken Licken (1986)
- Bend and Stretch (1987)
- This Little Nose (1987)
- Mum's Home (1987)
- Peter Pan (1987) by J. M. Barrie, an edition of Peter and Wendy (1911)
- Sleeping (1988)
- Reading (1988)
- Kitten Day (1989)
- The Saucepan Game (1989)
- The Frog Prince (1991) by David Lloyd, an edition of the Brothers Grimm fairy tale
- When We Went to the Zoo (1991)
- Midnight Pillow Fight (1993)
- Rock-a-Baby (1994)
- Goodbye Mousie (1994) by Robie Harris
- To Baby with Love, Rhymes for Babies (1994)
- Two Bears and Joe (1995) by Penelope Lively
- Ms McDonald had a Class (1998)
- A Twist in the Tail: Animal Stories from Around the World (2001) by Mary Hoffman
- Miss Mouse's Day (2001)
- If You're Happy And You Know It! (2003), illustrated by Lindsey Gardiner
- Lizzie Nonsense (2004)
- Emily and Albert (2004) by David Slonim
- When an Elephant Comes to School (2005)
- The Buffalo Storm (2007) by Katherine Applegate LCCN 2006-15661
- Whoosh Around the Mulberry Bush (2007), illustrated by Lindsey Gardiner
- Ballet Sisters: The Duckling and the Swan (2007)
- Ballet Sisters: The Newest Dancer (2008)
- Water Witcher (2008)
- Molly and Her Dad (2008) by Carol Thompson
- Over in the Clover (2009), illustrated by Lindsey Gardiner
- Maudie and Bear (Prahan, Victoria: Little Hare, 2010), illustrated by Freya Blackwood
- Itsy-bitsy Babies (Surry Hills, NSW: Little Hare Books, 2010) by Margaret Wild, LCCN 2011-287434
- Itsy-bitsy Animals (Little Hare, 2011) by Margaret Wild, LCCN 2012-450533
- The Animal Bop Won't Stop! (2011), illustrated by Lindsey Gardiner
- Shake a Leg (2011) by Boori Monty Pryor
- The Baby Swap (2015), illustrated by Andrew Joyner; LCCN 2013-47673
