= Celine Kiernan =

Irish author (born 1967)

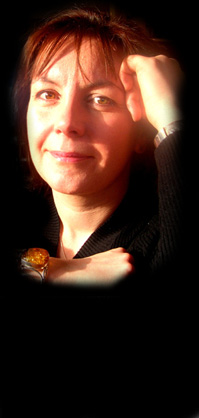
- Born: October 1967; Dublin, Ireland
- Occupation: Novelist
- Language: English
- Genre: Fantasy
- Notable awards: Readers Association of Ireland Award; 2009 The Poison Throne; CBI Book of The Year; 2012 Into The Grey

Celine Kiernan (born October 1967 in Dublin) is an Irish author of fantasy novels for young adults. She is best known for The Moorehawke Trilogy. Set in an alternate renaissance Europe, the trilogy combines fantasy elements with an exploration of political, humanitarian and philosophical themes.

== Publications ==
=== The Moorehawke Trilogy ===
The first book of the Moorehawk Trilogy, The Poison Throne, was first published in Ireland in 2008. It won the 2009 Readers' Association of Ireland Award for best book, was included in the White Raven Collection (2009) and short listed for the 2009 Irish Book Awards in two categories (best newcomer and best children's book). It was long-listed for the 2010 Australian Inkys Award.

All three books in The Moorehawke Trilogy (The Poison Throne, The Crowded Shadows, and The Rebel Prince) have gone on to international publication, being translated into nine languages and published in the English language territories of the UK, US and AUS/NZ. In 2010, the trilogy was included in Dymocks "Kids' Top 51".

=== Into the Grey ===
Kiernan's fourth novel, Into the Grey (known as Taken Away in AUS/NZ) was published in 2011. It is set in 1974 Ireland, and continues Kiernan's exploration of political, historical and philosophical themes through fantasy elements. It is the first book to receive both the CBI Book of the Year Award (formerly known as the Bisto Award) and the CBI Children's Choice Award – both of which were awarded on 28 May 2012. It won the 2013 Readers' Association of Ireland Award for best book

=== Resonance ===
Kiernan's fifth novel, Resonance, is scheduled for publication in 2014. Set in Victorian Ireland, it is described by its publishers as "metaphysical gothic".
