= Áine Ní Ghlinn =

Irish poet, children's writer

Áine Ní Ghlinn (Áine Glynn) is a bilingual Irish journalist, poet and children's writer. She was Laureate na nÓg (Children's Literature Laureate), 2020–2023, the first to write exclusively in Irish. She is a member of Aosdána.

== Life and work ==
Áine Ní Ghlinn has a BA in Irish & English and a HDip Education from UCD, a Diploma in Journalism from the London School of Journalism and an MA in Creative Writing is from Lancaster University. She lives in Dublin.

Ní Ghlinn has won various awards for adult and children's poetry, drama, fiction. She has also received several bursaries from Foras na Gaeilge and from the Irish Arts Council.

Her awards include Gradam Reics Carló Irish language Children's Book of the Year on 4 occasions, CBI Fiction honour award, LAI Book of the Year award, poetry awards at Listowel Writers' Week & Strokestown Poetry Festival, several Oireachtas awards for YA fiction and a Patrick Kavanagh Fellowship for poetry.

== Bibliography ==
=== Poetry collections ===
- An Chéim Bhriste (Baile Átha Cliath, Coiscéim, 1984)
- Gairdín Pharthais (Coiscéim, 1988)
- Deora nár Caoineadh/Unshed Tears (Dublin, The Dedalus Press/Coiscéim, 1996).
- Tostanna (Coiscéim, 2006)
- An Guth Baineann (LeabhairCOMHAR, 2013)
- Rúin Oscailte (Coiscéim, 2021)
- Dánta Idir Shean & Nua ( Cló IarChonnacht 2025)

=== Poetry collections (as editor) ===
- Duanaire Naithí (Coiscéim, 2005)
- Duanaire na Camóige (Coiscéim, 2006)

=== Non-fiction ===
- Mná as an nGnáth (Baile Átha Cliath, An Gúm, 1990)
- Daoine agus Déithe (An Gúm, 199
- Fadó Riamh... ag an tús (LeabhairCOMHAR, 2019)

=== Children's picturebooks ===
- Nílim ag iarraidh dul ar scoil (LeabhairCOMHAR)
- Hata Oisín (LeabhairCOMHAR)
- Cinnín Óir agus na Trí Bhéar (An Gúm)
- Daidí na Nollag (An tSnáthaid Mhór)
- Ag Buzzáil sa Gháirdín (An tSnáthaid Mhór)
- Óstán na bhFeithidí (An tSnáthaid Mhór)
- Na Trí Mhuicín (Futa Fata)
- Santa sa Bhaile (An tSnáthaid Mhór)

=== Children's & YA fiction ===
- Daifní Díneasár (O'Brien Press)
- Moncaí Dána (O'Brien Press)
- Lámhainní Glasa (O'Brien Press)
- Éasca Péasca (O'Brien Press)
- Thar an Trasnán (O'Brien Press)
- An Leaba Sciathánach (An Gúm)
- Céard tá sa Bhosca? (An Gúm)
- Glantachán Earraigh (An Gúm)
- Madra Meabhrach (Cois Life)
- Fuadach (Cois Life)
- Tromluí (Cois Life)
- Cuairteoir (Cois Life)
- Úbalonga (An Gúm)
- Daideo (Cois Life, 2014)
- Hata Zú Mhamó (Cois Life, 2016)
- An Múinteoir Nua (An Gúm)
- Boscadán (Cois Life, 2019)
- I Mo Chroí Istigh (Cló IarChonnacht, 2021)
- Cairdeas & Cogadh (Cló IarChonnacht, 2025)

=== Poetry for children ===
- Brionglóidí agus aistir eile (Cló Mhaigh Eo)
- Bronntanais agus féiríní eile (Cló Mhaigh Eo)

=== Drama for children ===
- Éaló ón Zú (Cló Mhaigh Eo)
- Cochaillín Dearg (An Gúm)

Cultural offices
Preceded by Sarah Crossan	Laureate na nÓg; 2020–2023	Succeeded by Patricia Forde
