= Eureka! (2022 TV series) =

American-Irish animated children's television series

- Genre: Musical
- Created by: Norton Virgien; Niamh Sharkey
- Developed by: Erica Rothschild
- Voices of: Ruth Righi; Renée Elise Goldsberry; Lil Rel Howery; Javier Muñoz; Kai Zen; Devin Trey Campbell; Fred Tatasciore
- Opening theme: "Eureka! Main Title Theme," performed by Lexi Underwood
- Ending theme: "Eureka! Main Title Theme" (instrumental)
- Composers: Frederik Wiedmann (score); Kari Kimmel (songs)
- Countries of origin: United States; Ireland
- Original language: English
- No. of seasons: 1
- No. of episodes: 30 (60 segments)

Production
- Executive producers: Norton Virgien; Niamh Sharkey; Cathal Gaffney; Darragh O'Connell
- Producer: Edel Byrne
- Editor: Fred O'Connor
- Running time: 23 minutes
- Production company: Brown Bag Films

Original release
- Network: Disney Junior
- Release: June 22, 2022 – March 24, 2023

Eureka! is an animated children’s television series created by Norton Virgien and Niamh Sharkey that aired on Disney Junior from June 22, 2022 to March 24, 2023. The series is produced by Brown Bag Films. It centers on Eureka, a young prehistoric girl who uses scientific thinking to solve problems.

== Premise ==
In the Stone Age location of Rocky Falls, a prehistoric girl named Eureka enjoys going on adventures and building gadgets to help improve the lifestyles of her family and friends.

== Characters ==
=== Main ===
- Eureka (voiced by Ruth Righi) is a liberal and open-minded prehistoric girl who is also an inventor way ahead of her time. She was credited as being responsible for inventing the wheel. To make an invention, Eureka would do something called "Thinkering" (a combination of the words thinking and tinkering).
- Roxy (voiced by Renée Elise Goldsberry) is Eureka's mother who is the proprietor and chef of Paleo, Rocky Falls' only restaurant.
- Rollo (voiced by Lil Rel Howery) is Eureka's father who owns the pottery shop and is an expert potter.
- Ohm (voiced by Javier Muñoz) is Eureka's teacher who has an outdoor classroom.
- Pepper (voiced by Kai Zen) is one of Eureka's best friends. She's courageous and has super-strength.
- Barry (voiced by Devin Trey Campbell) is one of Eureka's best friends. He's an artist and a drummer.
- Murphy (vocal effects provided by Fred Tatasciore) is Eureka's pet woolly mammoth. Eureka adopted Murphy after saving him from being trapped under a fallen tree branch.
- Dipply (vocal effects provided by Fred Tatasciore) is Pepper's pet diplosaurus.

=== Recurring ===
- Bog (voiced by Cade Tropeano) is a conservative boy and Eureka's classmate who likes being the leader.
  - Ump (vocal effects provided by Fred Tatasciore) is Bog's pet Glyptosaurus which evokes the traits of a Glyptodon and an armadillo.
- Clod (voiced by Connor Andrade) is a turtle-loving boy and Eureka's classmate who is very loyal to Bog.
- Julia (voiced by Madigan Kacmar) is a girl who is one of Eureka's classmates and an expert at playing the flute.
- Ember (voiced by Sasha Knight) is a girl with blonde and blue hair who is one of Eureka's classmates.
- Sierra (voiced by Ryan Michelle Bathé) is Barry's mother who is Rocky Falls' residential dentist.
- Sandy (voiced by Wendell Pierce) is Barry's father who is Rocky Falls' residential handyman.
- Dima (voiced by Kevin Michael Richardson) is Barry's grandfather.
- Verna (voiced by Cree Summer) is Barry's grandmother.
- Wanda (voiced by Loretta Devine) is Eureka's paternal grandmother who is a traveler.
  - Yonder (vocal effects provided by Fred Tatasciore) is a ground sloth who is Wanda's pet and travel companion.
- Yurt (voiced by Sheila E.) is a celebrity drummer whom Barry looks up to.
- Rockanne (voiced by Misty Copeland) is a dance instructor.
- Chee (voiced by Ellie Kemper) is the school librarian.
- Kanga Bird (also known as KB) (voiced by Jack McBrayer) is a dinosaur that evokes the traits of a Kangadon and a bird. Unlike other prehistoric animals in this show, KB is able to speak a few words. He becomes Barry's pet in "Be My KB".
- Spruce and Cypress Stoneland (both voiced by Judah Howery) are twin brothers.
- Olive (voiced by Aydrea Walden) and Ivy (voiced by Cree Summer) are Pepper's mothers.
- Ferreka (vocal effects provided by Jan Johns) is the leader of a pack of mischievous bronto-ferrets. Her creativity which rivals that of Eureka earned her the name "Ferreka" which is a portmanteau of ferret and Eureka.

== Episodes ==
No.	Title	Directed by	Written by	Storyboard by	Original release date	Prod. code	U.S. viewers (millions)
1	"Tusks, Trouble and All"	Norton Virgien	Erica Rothschild	Tim Spillane	June 22, 2022	101	0.16
1	"Absoflutely Fabulous"	Maeve Garvan	Laurie Israel	Ilenia Gennari	June 22, 2022	101	0.16
"Tusk, Trouble and All": While riding on the Rock and Rollers with Barry and Pepper, Eureka finds a trapped woolly mammoth beneath a fallen tree branch. Finding things in common with the woolly mammoth, Eureka names it Murphy and persuades her parents to adopt him, much to the doubts of Rocky Falls' civilians. Though she works to find a way to get Murphy to fit him in the entrance of their house. Song: "First Time for Everything" by Eureka and the Rocky Falls civilians "Absoflutely Fabulous": A new girl named Julia is starting school and is shown to be an expert at playing the flute. Eureka plans to give her a good gift during the welcoming ceremony in order to befriend her. She gives her a new type of flute that she can use. When Julie doesn't give a positive reaction, Eureka works to build a better gift to impress her. Song: "Think Differently" by Eureka
2	"Everybody Lava Pizza"	Mårten Jönmark	Jason Mayland	Kwabena Sarfo	June 23, 2022 (Note: This episode was first released on Disney+ on June 22, 2022.)	102	0.27
2	"Prehistoric Class Pets"	Maeve Garvan	Sierra Katow	Benjamin Sanders	June 23, 2022	102	0.27
3	"Follow the Sledder"	Mårten Jönmark	Aydrea Walden	Andy Kelly	June 24, 2022	103	0.17
3	"Stinkpod Day"	Maeve Garvan	Johnny LaZebnik	Jose Guzman	June 24, 2022	103	0.17
4	"Pepper Power"	Maeve Garvan	Laurie Israel	Tim Spillane	July 1, 2022	104	0.23
4	"Flickerwing Butterflies"	Mårten Jönmark	Matt Eddy	Ilenia Gennari	July 1, 2022	104	0.23
5	"Epic Fail"	Maeve Garvan	Billy Eddy	Kwabena Sarfo	July 8, 2022	105	0.16
5	"Yes We Cannon!"	Mårten Jönmark	Jason Mayland	Jose Guzman	July 8, 2022	105	0.16
6	"Snurfy Murphy"	Maeve Garvan	Sierra Katow	Nondas Korodimos	July 15, 2022	106	0.19
6	"New Rock on the Block"	Mårten Jönmark	Aydrea Walden	Benjamin Sanders	July 15, 2022	106	0.19
7	"Light at the End of the Cave"	Maeve Garvan	Keshni Kashyap	TJ House	July 22, 2022	107	0.17
7	"Kanga-Bird is the Word"	Mårten Jönmark	Johnny LaZebnik	Andy Kelly	July 22, 2022	107	0.17
8	"What a Wheel!"	Mårten Jönmark	Erica Rothschild	Ilenia Gennari	July 29, 2022	108	0.15
8	"Just Like Yurt"	Maeve Garvan	Jason Mayland	Cristina Menghi	July 29, 2022	108	0.15
9	"The Great Wafflefruit Race"	Mårten Jönmark	Aydrea Walden	Jose Guzman	August 5, 2022	110	0.19
9	"Camped Out"	Maeve Garvan	Matt Eddy	Nondas Korodimos	August 5, 2022	110	0.19
10	"Project Bog"	Maeve Garvan	Sierra Katow	Kwabena Sarfo	August 12, 2022	109	0.13
10	"Really Giant Slalom"	Mårten Jönmark	Billy Eddy	Dan Nosella	August 12, 2022	109	0.13
11	"Ferreka"	Mårten Jönmark	Jason Mayland	Cristina Menghi	August 19, 2022	TBA	0.18
11	"Peppereka"	Maeve Garvan	Carina Chocano	Kwabena Sarfo	August 19, 2022	TBA	0.18
12	"Dance Dance Evolution"	Maeve Garvan	Aydrea Walden	Nondas Korodimos	August 26, 2022	114	0.22
12	"Barry On"	Mårten Jönmark	Johnny LaZebnik	Kinjo Estioko	August 26, 2022	114	0.22
13	"Dippling Rivalry"	Maeve Garvan	Sierra Katow	Massimiliano Lucania	September 16, 2022	115	0.22
13	"It's Mom O'Clock"	Mårten Jönmark	Billy Eddy	Jose Guzman	September 16, 2022	115	0.22
14	"Eurek-Or-Treat"	Mårten Jönmark	Johnny LaZebnik	Benjamin Sanders	September 27, 2022	112	0.20
14	"Nomad Like Home"	Maeve Garvan	Sierra Katow	Ilenia Gennari	September 27, 2022	112	0.20
15	"Rocky Falls Picture Show"	Maeve Garvan	Jason Mayland	Boyet Gopez	September 30, 2022	116	N/A
15	"The Swamp of Lost Tools"	Mårten Jönmark	Latoya Raveneau	Benjamin Sanders	September 30, 2022	116	N/A
16	"W-W-W-Wipe Out!"	Mårten Jönmark	Latoya Raveneau	Andy Kelly	October 7, 2022	TBA	0.17
16	"Cutaballoo vs. Bebe Sloth"	Maeve Garvan	Maria O'Loughlin	Boyet Gopez	October 7, 2022	TBA	0.17
17	"Barry's Brrr-thday"	Maeve Garvan	Aydrea Walden	Irene Martini	October 14, 2022	TBA	N/A
17	"Ptero Tap"	Mårten Jönmark	Sierra Katow	Fiona Ryan	October 14, 2022	TBA	N/A
18	"A Eureka Special"	Maeve Garvan	Niamh Sharkey	Cristina Menghi	October 28, 2022	TBA	N/A
18	"Be My KB"	Mårten Jönmark	Billy Eddy	Ilenia Gennari	October 28, 2022	TBA	N/A
19	"Ump Lays an Egg"	Mårten Jönmark	Erica Rothschild	David Frasquet	November 4, 2022	TBA	N/A
19	"The Peace of Pizza"	Maeve Garvan	Johnny LaZebnik	Kinjo Estioko	November 4, 2022	TBA	N/A
20	"Jingle Bog Rock"	Maeve Garvan	Maria O'Loughlin	Massimiliano Lucania	November 30, 2022	120	0.30
20	"Zip to It"	Mårten Jönmark	Aydrea Walden	Benjamin Sanders	November 30, 2022	120	0.30
21	"Endless Pots-ibilities"	Mårten Jönmark	Sierra Katow	Fiona Ryan	February 6, 2023	TBA	0.09
21	"Glooze Blues"	Marcel Moorcroft	Laurie Israel	Boyet Gopez	February 6, 2023	TBA	0.09
22	"KBs of a Feather"	Maeve Garvan	Johnny LaZebnik	Cristina Menghi	February 7, 2023	TBA	N/A
22	"Ember Remembers"	Mårten Jönmark	Latoya Raveneau	Irene Martini	February 7, 2023	TBA	N/A
23	"Making Up Moonlight"	Paul Hurwitz & Fiona Ryan	Matt Eddy	Kwabena Sarfo	February 8, 2023	TBA	N/A
23	"Dipply Goes to the Dentist"	Mårten Jönmark	Jason Mayland	Ilenia Gennari	February 8, 2023	TBA	N/A
24	"Pepper the Inventor"	Maeve Garvan	Billy Eddy	David Frasquet	February 9, 2023	TBA	0.08
24	"Walky Falls"	Rossa Lundberg	Aydrea Walden	Massimiliano Lucania	February 9, 2023	TBA	0.08
25	"Starting From Scratch"	Maeve Garvan	Aydrea Walden	Massimiliano Lucania	February 10, 2023	TBA	N/A
25	"Make a Quish"	Mårten Jönmark	Johnny LaZebnik	David Frasquet	February 10, 2023	TBA	N/A
26	"Up Up and a Little Too Far Away"	Niamh Sharkey	Jason Mayland	Kinjo Estioko	February 24, 2023	TBA	N/A
26	"Don't Be Alarmed!"	Fiona Ryan	Billy Eddy	David Frasquet	February 24, 2023	TBA	N/A
27	"Shellebration"	Claire Lennon	Sierra Katow	Irene Martini	March 3, 2023	TBA	0.13
27	"You Can't Twin Them All"	Fiona Ryan	Matt Eddy	Ilenia Gennari	March 3, 2023	TBA	0.13
28	"Paleo to Go"	Norton Virgien	Elliott Maya	Irene Martini	March 10, 2023	TBA	N/A
28	"Flower Power-er"	Maeve Garvan	Aydrea Walden	David Frasquet	March 10, 2023	TBA	N/A
29	"Mightysaura"	Fiona Ryan	Laurie Israel	Massi Lucania	March 17, 2023	TBA	N/A
29	"A Clean Getaway"	Fiona Ryan	Johnny LaZebnik	Ilenia Gennari	March 17, 2023	TBA	N/A
30	"The Never-Ending Snorey"	Daniel Cantwell	Jason Mayland	Naoise Dempsey & Charles Grosvenor	March 24, 2023	TBA	0.18
30	"Thinker-inker-Inkering"	Giedre Kaveckaite	Erica Rothschild	Kinjo Estioko	March 24, 2023	TBA	0.18

== Release ==
Eureka! premiered on Disney Junior and on the Disney+ streaming service on June 22, 2022. debuting alongside its first four episodes that were made available to stream on demand before there broadcast .

== Reception ==
=== Critical response ===
Alex Reif of LaughingPlace.com said, "The inventions and gadgets Eureka creates range from practical ones in the real world to fantastical ones designed to enchant viewers. Embedded within these stories is some practical science, such as Eureka designing a lift and pulley system to free Murphy when he's stuck. There's also some fun educational opportunities for children watching with a parent over things like a sun dial being used to tell time in Eureka's outdoor classroom. Whether through her actions or the songs she sings, Eureka teaches kids to think outside the box to find solutions to problems. In addition to dinosaurs and fun prehistoric animals, Eureka's world is full of friends that add social lessons for kids through entertaining and engaging stories." Diondra Brown of Common Sense Media gave Eureka! a grade of five out of five stars, praised the depiction of positive messages and role models, stating that the show encourages to be true to oneself and promotes creativity, while noting the educational value and the diversity among the characters.

=== Accolades ===
The series was nominated for Outstanding Animated Series at the 2023 NAACP Image Awards. It received a nomination for Outstanding Casting for an Animated Program at the 2nd Children's and Family Emmy Awards.

== In other media ==
=== Video games ===
- Treehouse Builders.
