= List of Henry Hugglemonster episodes =

Henry Hugglemonster is an animated children's television series produced by Brown Bag Films and based on the 2005 book I'm a Happy Hugglewug written and illustrated by Niamh Sharkey. It premiered on Disney Junior and Disney Channel on April 15, 2013.

The series ended on November 30, 2015 on Disney Junior.

== Series overview ==
Season	Segments	Episodes	Originally released	
Season	Segments	Episodes	First released	Last released
1	50	26	April 15, 2013	May 2, 2014
2	44	23	October 24, 2014	November 30, 2015

== Episodes ==
=== Season 1 (2013–14) ===
No. overall	No. in season	Title	Directed by	Written by	Storyboard by	Original release date	Prod. code	U.S. viewers (millions)
1a	1a	"The Huggleflower"	Matthew Darragh	Sascha Paladino	Vitaly Shafirov	April 15, 2013	101a	N/A
Summer is desperate for the Huggleflower to bloom so she can put on a show, so Henry must find a way to get the sun to shine on the flower.
1b	1b	"Monster Lullaby"	Matthew Darragh	Chris Nee	Andy Kelly	April 15, 2013	101b	N/A
Momma tells Henry and Summer that Ivor is having a hard time sleeping, so the siblings volunteer to help Ivor go to sleep for good while the parents have time to themselves. However, the siblings have a hard time following Ivor's bedtime schedule.
2a	2a	"Astrobrix"	Matthew Darragh	Paul Dawson	Vince James	April 16, 2013	102a	N/A
When Cobby tells Henry that he is too young to help build his spaceship model, he snatches the unfinished model so he can play outside with Ivor. Unfortunately, Ivor accidentally breaks the ship, and when Cobby finds out, he presumes that Henry is lying, claiming that he didn't snatch it.
2b	2b	"The Sore Roar"	Matthew Darragh	James Mason	Jose Antonio Cerro	April 16, 2013	102b	N/A
Henry loses his voice while practicing for the “loudest roar in town” competition. Cobby entrusts a disappointed Henry with qualifying the roars.
3a	3a	"Runaway Dough"	Darragh O'Connell	Paul Dawson	Andy Kelly	April 17, 2013	103a	N/A
While making bread, Henry abuses the correct measurement of yeast that the recipe calls for. Things take a turn for the worse when the excess of yeast causes the dough to morph into a wrecking ball that begins obliterating Roarsville.
3b	3b	"The Copymonster"	Darragh O'Connell	Sascha Paladino	Charles Grosvenor	April 17, 2013	103b	N/A
Henry notices that his friend Roberto is starting to copy the design of his race car for his Monster Scout's "Roaring Racers" competition.
4a	4a	"The Henry Show"	Matthew Darragh	Jennifer Hamburg	Mick Harrison	April 18, 2013	105a	N/A
After watching Summer perform in one of her shows, Henry is inspired to put on a show of his own, but it goes terribly wrong.
4b	4b	"Megabouncers"	Vitaly Shafirov	Bradley Zweig	Glen Kennedy	April 18, 2013	105b	N/A
Henry and his friends use Cobby's newest invention, Megabouncer Boots, to bounce all over Roarsville, but they end up provoking a massive earthquake across the town.
5a	5a	"Bye Bye Beckett"	Vitaly Shafirov	Chris Nee	Glen Kennedy	April 19, 2013	106a	N/A
Summer's trip doesn't go as planned when she accepts about having to leave the family's monsterpet Beckett at the vets while the family goes camping to Rainbow Falls.
5b	5b	"Pet Party"	Vitaly Shafirov	Bradley Zweig	Vince James	April 19, 2013	106b	N/A
Henry and Summer decide to throw a birthday party for Beckett with all of his monsterpet friends, but the Fuzzle Birds (endemic bird species) are annoyed by the monsterpets' loud noises.
6a	6a	"Number One Fan"	Matthew Darragh	Jennifer Hamburg and Sascha Paladino	Mick Harrison	April 22, 2013	108a	N/A
Summer gets the chance to perform live with her favorite pop singer, Isabella Roarson. Summer doesn't like the sound of her own voice and feels she can imitate Isabella's voice. Soon, she shows Isabella her perfect imitation but Isabella doesn't want a copycat for her performance. Guest starring: Geri Halliwell as Isabella Roarson
6b	6b	"Henry's Hugglefish"	Matthew Darragh	Jennifer Hamburg	Eddy Houchins	April 22, 2013	108b	N/A
Henry and Daddo go fishing and Henry catches a Hugglefish which he calls Little Levon. When Levon grows too big for the house, Henry makes the difficult decision to return him to Rainbow Falls where he caught him.
7a	7a	"Sneezo-Rama"	Matthew Darragh	Bradley Zweig	Mick Harrison	April 23, 2013	113a	N/A
Gertie brings her monsterpet, Sneezo, over for a playdate with Beckett. Problems arise when Henry does not obey Gertie's orders to keep Sneezo indoors where Sneezo will not sneeze due to the monster flowers, and Sneezo soon has an allergy attack.
7b	7b	"The Huggleball Game"	Vitaly Shafirov	Kent Redeker	Sasha McIntyre	April 23, 2013	113b	N/A
The children of the town and their parents come face to face in a Huggleball deathmatch.
8a	8a	"The Hugglejuice Stand"	Matthew Darragh	Jennifer Hamburg	Vincent James	April 24, 2013	116a	N/A
Henry and his friends open a juice stand, but run out of the sweet flowers used to make the Hugglejuice. After venturing out and jacking some from the local fields, a chain of riots and looting follow after Signor Roartonio claims that he needs them for his cannoli and after Denzel's Father claims that he needs them for his muffins.
8b	8b	"The Huggledance Party"	Vitaly Shafirov	Bradley Zweig	Garrett O'Donoghue	April 24, 2013	116b	N/A
Henry must solve the issue that his big brother Cobby can't dance, and due to this, he quits his position as DJ, putting the annual Huggledance Party at high risk.
9a	9a	"Promises Promises"	Matthew Darragh	Sascha Paladino	Garrett O'Donoghue	April 25, 2013	109a	N/A
Summer says she needs a person who is brave, handsome and smart to play a prince. She asks Henry, saying he would be perfect for the role, and he agrees to. Unfortunately, when Henry is lured by Denzel to dig tunnels, Summer confronts Henry for his misdeed.
9b	9b	"Fireworks Night"	Vitaly Shafirov	Paul Dawson	Dennis Moric	April 25, 2013	109b	N/A
When Cobby's new invention is accidentally smashed by Summer's freaky dancing, the Hugglemonsters must find the missing pieces in time to make it to the pyrotechnics show.
10a	10a	"Paint the Town"	Matthew Darragh	Robert Vargas	Juan Carlos Moreno	April 26, 2013	114a	N/A
The kids of Roarsville decide to tidy up the town in an attempt to win a new playground in the Most Beautiful Town contest. However, they fail and soon decide to splatter-paint the buildings, eventually winning the playground.
10b	10b	"Henry, Incorporated"	Matthew Darragh	Joe Ansolabehere	Eddie Houchins	April 26, 2013	114b	N/A
Henry saves up his money to get a racing set from Mr. Winklemonster, the toy vendor, but his friends are also saving up to buy the same toy. Henry them comes up with a grim plan to buy the play set: he scams everyone by offering them to ride Cobby's recently concocted “Monster Mitt” in exchange for money, not knowing that Cobby claimed that anyone who rode the Mitt didn't have to pay. When Henry finally purchased the set, all the children are mad at Henry for committing a scam.
11a	11a	"Monsters on the Town"	Matthew Darragh	Chris Nee	Akis Dimitrakopoulos	April 29, 2013	107a	N/A
Henry and his siblings put their good table manners to the test when they decide to surprise Momma and take her to Signor Roartonio's Cafe for a nice meal. However, they soon taste a dish that makes them bounce and their parents become suspicious of their odd behavior.
11b	11b	"Enormo Henry"	Vitaly Shafirov	Robert Vargas	Arnold Valencia	April 29, 2013	107b	N/A
In an attempt to fit in at his friend Estelle Enormomonster's house, where everything is huge, Henry convinces Cobby to build him an Enormo-Suit.
12a	12a	"Grrr Power"	Matthew Darragh	Jennifer Hamburg	Brian Wong	April 30, 2013	112a	N/A
When Henry and his friend Denzel find an old album cover featuring their mothers in a rock band called "Grrr Power," they come up with the idea to put together a reunion concert.
12b	12b	"Fangs Out"	Vitaly Shafirov	Michael Stern	Charles Grosvenor	April 30, 2013	112b	N/A
Henry is excited for the Fang Monster to take his loose fang and leave him a special gift. But Henry can't roar without this fang.
13a	13a	"Carried Away"	Vitaly Shafirov	Chris Nee	Sasha McIntyre	May 2, 2013	118a	N/A
Henry invites the talent show judge, Mr. Growl, to the house for dinner in hopes of convincing him to allow Daddo to participate in the "Grr Factor" talent contest. To welcome Mr. Growl, Cobby soon blows up lots of balloons. But too many balloons in one room of the house causes the house to start levitating. Worst of all, Mr. Growl's afraid of heights.
13b	13b	"Monster in Charge"	Matthew Darragh	Robert Vargas	Mick Harrison	May 2, 2013	118b	N/A
When Momma and Daddo go out dancing for the night, they leave Cobby in charge of his younger siblings. However, the responsibility quickly goes to his head, and he starts making a bunch of silly and unfair rules that upset Summer. With Henry’s help, Cobby and Summer eventually learn that working together and listening to one another is the best way to get along as a family.
14a	14a	"Iron Granny"	Matthew Darragh	Robert Vargas	Andy Kelly	May 10, 2013	110a	N/A
Henry and Denzel argue over whose grandmother is better before the Iron Granny competition. So, Henry helps his grandmonster, Nan-Oh, train for the Iron Granny competition, but Denzel helps his Grand-Moh train as well. Soon, the boys get competitive about who will win.
14b	14b	"The Monster Coin"	Matthew Darragh	Robert Vargas	Garrett O'Donoghue	May 10, 2013	110b	N/A
When Grando visits Henry's house and shows Henry a very special monster coin called a spinner, Henry soon loses track of the coin, so Cobby uses his newest invention, the "Listening Laser," to find the coin.
15a	15a	"Rain, Rain, You're Not a Pain"	Vitaly Shafirov	Michael Stern	Rinat Gazizov	May 24, 2013	119a	N/A
Henry is determined to find a place for he and his friends to swim for the 'most roarsome day ever' when their plans of going to Monster Wave park are ruined when it starts to rain.
15b	15b	"Runaway Summer"	Matthew Darragh	Robert Vargas	Garrett O'Donoghue	May 24, 2013	119b	N/A
When Summer accidentally drops a necklace that Henry made for Momma down the drain, she decides to run away from home to avoid being punished. Henry and Cobby set out to find her and convince her to return before the family photo is taken.
16a	16a	"Monsterpet Pageant"	Vitaly Shafirov	Bradley Zweig	David Frasquet	June 7, 2013	121a	N/A
Henry trains Beckett for the first-ever Roarsville Monsterpet Pageant, where monsterpets compete for the chance to ride on a float in the town parade. However, Estelle and Flopster end up winning the competition, leaving Henry feeling jealous and disappointed. Just as the parade is about to begin, the lights across Roarsville go out and can't be fixed until the next morning, forcing the parade to be canceled and leaving Estelle and Flopster heartbroken. Realizing how much the parade means to his friends, Henry puts his jealousy aside and find a way to save the celebration.
16b	16b	"Ivor's First Stomp"	Matthew Darragh	Jose Ansolabehere	Juan Carlos Moreno	June 7, 2013	121b	N/A
The Hugglemonsters are thrilled when it looks like Ivor is about to take his first monster stomp during a family picnic. Daddo plans on taking a picture of Ivor but whenever Daddo pulls out the camera, Ivor won't stomp.
17a	17a	"The Piano Lesson"	Matthew Darragh	James Mason	Keith Tucker	June 21, 2013	104a	N/A
When Gertie arrives at Henry's house, Henry thinks she came for a playdate but she actually just came over for a piano lesson with her piano teacher, who is none other than Momma. Henry tries to make time pass quickly by enjoying himself attempting to distract Gertie from completing her lesson/
17b	17b	"Monster Wave"	Matthew Darragh	Chris Nee	Andy Kelly	June 21, 2013	104b	N/A
Cobby makes it his personal mission to help Henry conquer his fear of the Monster Wave Pool so he can try surfing for the very first time.
18a	18a	"The Mighty Heromonsters"	Shane Collins	Sascha Paladino	Rinat Gazizov	August 9, 2013	125a	N/A
When Henry's favorite comic book, The Mighty Roarhammer (A parody of The Mighty Thor) ends on an unresolved cliffhanger, he and his friends decide to create their own comic book to decide what happens next.
18b	18b	"New Monsterkid on the Block"	Vitaly Shafirov	Robert Vargas	Lazarino Baarde	August 9, 2013	125b	N/A
When Henry and his friends need one more player for a game of Huggleball, Henry invites the new monster kid in town, Roddy Cloudmonster, to join them. At first, everyone is excited to welcome their new neighbor, but Roddy soon begins bullying the other kids and spoiling the fun. Henry must figure out how to handle the situation while showing what it really means to be a good friend. Guest starring: Tara Strong as Roddy Cloudmonster
19a	19a	"A Funny Thing Happened on the Way to Monsterschool"	Vitaly Shafirov	Robert Vargas and Sascha Paladino	Jennie Rutz	September 6, 2013	123a	1.48
When a loose object punctures the Hugglemonster family’s bike on their way to Monsterschool, Henry must find another way for the family to get to school without it. However, each attempt to reach their destination brings a new obstacle, from unexpected stops caused by road construction to powerful gusts of wind. With time running out, Henry and his family must keep moving and find a way to make it to Monsterschool before they’re late.
19b	19b	"Summergrams"	Matthew Darragh	Bradley Zweig	Mick Harrison	September 6, 2013	123b	1.48
After stumbling across Milo's birthday party causes Henry and Summer realize that Summer's singing makes monsters happy, they decide to bike all around Roarsville singing "Summergrams." Problems arise when Captain Hollander mishears all of Summer's "summergrams" to him as insults.
20a	20a	"The Halloween Scramble"	Vitaly Shafirov	Chris Nee	Charles Grosvenor	October 4, 2013	117a	1.15
After a big gust of wind threatens to ruin Roarsville's annual Halloween parade, it's up to Henry to catch the gigantic balloons that flew away and save the day to earn his most prized chocolate bar.
20b	20b	"Scout's Night Out"	Matthew Darragh	Bradley Zweig	Jose Antonio Cerro	October 4, 2013	117b	1.15
Henry helps his friend Denzel get over his fears after he becomes scared by a spooky story that the antagonist Daddo tells during the Monster Scouts' camping trip.
21a	21a	"Huggsgiving Day"	Vitaly Shafirov	Jennifer Hamburg	Eddie Houchins	November 15, 2013	120a	1.06
It's Henry's favorite holiday, Thanksgiving, where the whole family comes together to eat, play games and put on performances that reflect what they love about their family. But...problems arise when Henry's annoying cousin, Harry, visits and won't stop pestering Henry.
21b	21b	"All That Pizzazz"	Matthew Darragh	Chris Nee	Vincent James	November 15, 2013	120b	1.06
Summer's bow goes missing, and Henry and Cobby are on the task to find it.
22	22	"Happy Hugglemas"	Vitaly Shafirov	Chris Nee	Andy Kelly	December 6, 2013	122	1.48
Henry almost misses his chance to turn on the Christmas lights for the first time when he's trapped inside Estelle's house, where everything is gigantic.
23a	23a	"The Sledhouse"	Vitaly Shafirov	Robert Vargas	Akis Dimitrakopoulos	February 7, 2014	109a	1.28
When Daddo wakes up with a bad cold, Henry must come up with creative ideas to include him in the family sledding adventure.
23b	23b	"Daddo Daycare"	Vitaly Shafirov	Chris Nee	Jose Antonio Cerro	February 7, 2014	109b	1.28
Daddo is in charge of the family while Momma is gone for the weekend, and Henry rallies the family to help him out.
24a	24a	"Monster Seeds"	Vitaly Shafirov	Bradley Zweig	Keith Tucker and Andy Kelly	January 21, 2014	124a	1.18
When Henry and Estelle Enormomonster's seed packets get mixed up, Henry winds up with a giant plant sprouting out of the top of his house.
24b	24b	"Henry and the Sno-Grrr"	Matthew Darragh	Colm Tyrrell	Garrett O'Donoghue	January 21, 2014	124b	1.18
Henry and Beckett set out to go sledding on Mount Roarsmore amidst rumors of a snow ogre living at the top of the mountain.
25a	25a	"Monster Mail Madness"	Matthew Darragh	Bradley Zweig	Akis Dimitrakopoulos	January 31, 2014	111a	1.49
Daddo asks Henry to help sort the mail at the post office on Valentine's Day. In an attempt to speed up the process, Henry accidentally makes a mess while sorting the mail.
25b	25b	"Cobby's Comfort Cruiser"	Vitaly Shafirov	Chris Nee	Arnold Valencia	January 31, 2014	111b	1.49
Cobby gets his first job at the Roarsville Bike Shop, where he introduces a new line of bicycles called Comfort Cruisers. However, the bikes keep malfunctioning, launching monsters into the air and leaving them muddy, soaked, injured, or covered in grime. Afraid that everyone will blame him for the accidents, Cobby hides in shame. Now, Henry must help him find the courage to face his customers and take responsibility for the problems.
26	26	"Once Upon a Roar"	Matthew Darragh	Jennifer Hamburg	Akis Dimitrakopoulos	May 2, 2014	126	1.38
Henry and Momma find themselves on a storybook adventure when they journey through the Glimmergrove, located in the Enchanted Monster forest. But when the colors start to disappear, they must work together with fairy tale characters to return a magical feather to the legendary Glimmerbird and bring the color back to the forest.

=== Season 2 (2014–15) ===
No. overall	No. in season	Title	Directed by	Written by	Storyboard by	Original release date	Prod. code	U.S. viewers (millions)
27a	1a	"Big Baby"	Shane Collins	Sascha Paladino	Akis Dimitrakopoulos	October 24, 2014	201a	N/A
Henry and his family visit the Enormomonster residence, after finding out that they gave birth to a new baby.
27b	1b	"Perfect Anniversary"	Matthew Darragh	Sascha Paladino	Ethan Hegge	October 24, 2014	201b	N/A
Henry and his siblings turn their house into a romantic restaurant for Momma and Daddo's anniversary dinner.
28a	2a	"Ivor Takes the Cake"	Matthew Darragh	Sascha Paladino	Mick Harrison	November 14, 2014	202a	N/A
Henry and Ivor try to catch the cake prepared for a surprise birthday party for Daddo when a bird steals it by accident.
28b	2b	"Runaway Airship"	Shane Collins	Sascha Paladino	David Schwartz	November 14, 2014	202b	N/A
Henry flies into town to buy some cannoli for Momma but then realizes that it's a windy day. He then has to save the pets, who are stuck in an airship.
29a	3a	"Where's Beckett?"	Matthew Darragh	Sascha Paladino	Brian Wong	November 24, 2014	203a	N/A
Beckett goes missing with Shakey so the monsters set off to find them.
29b	3b	"Huggleflight"	Shane Collins	Sascha Paladino	Fred Cline	November 24, 2014	203b	N/A
Henry teaches Gertie and Denzel how to fly like him, but don't have wings like him.
30a	4a	"Knit-O-Bot"	Shane Collins	Sascha Paladino	Juan Carlos Moreno	January 21, 2015	204a	N/A
Henry and Cobby create a Knit-O-Bot to help the grandmonsters knit a playground. Song: "Knit It Up"
30b	4b	"Scouts vs. Scouts"	Shane Collins	Sascha Paladino	Vincent James	January 21, 2015	204b	N/A
Henry's scout troop and their rivals compete on Scout's Game Day and learn that if they play by the rules, they will never lose. Henry, however, does the other thing around by cheating.
31a	5a	"Monsterly Ever After"	Shane Collins	Ashley Mendoza	Alex Basio	February 13, 2015	207a	N/A
It's a Roarsville wedding and Summer is assigned to be the flower monster in Signor Roartonio and Matilde's wedding, but she makes the wedding all about her and not the couple.
31b	5b	"The Roarsome Foursome"	Matthew Darragh	Alison McDonald	Brian Wong	February 13, 2015	207b	N/A
Henry and Denzel decide to start a boy band, called Roar Direction (a parody of One Direction). But when Denzel proves not to be a great singer, He must discover his true talent.
32a	6a	"The Do-It-Yourself Sleepover"	Matthew Darragh	Sascha Paladino and Robert Vargas	David Frasquet	March 13, 2015	206a	1.41
After being told he's not invited to Summer's sleepover, Henry crashes her sleepover party in various surprising ways in order to be a part of it.
32b	6b	"Roarsville Rules"	Shane Collins	Sascha Paladino and Robert Vargas	Nondas Korodimos	March 13, 2015	206b	1.41
When the new Mayor of Roarsville, Mayor Roariani goes out of town for an emergency meeting, she leaves Henry in charge.
33a	7a	"Summer Vision"	Shane Collins	Ciaran Murtagh and Andrew Jones	Mick Harrison	March 27, 2015	208a	N/A
Henry helps Summer make a roarsome movie before the Roarsville film festival.
33b	7b	"The Pizza Brothers"	Matthew Darragh	Maria O'Loughlin	Akis Dimitrakopoulos	March 27, 2015	208b	N/A
Henry offers to help at Roartonio's Café when Signor Roartonio's assistant goes home sick on Pizza Day.
34a	8a	"Cobby and the Brain"	Norton Virgien	Maria O'Loughlin	Tim Spillane	April 10, 2015	210a	N/A
It is the school science fair, and Henry is convinced that Cobby's invention is the best. On the other hand, Cobby meets a monsterette named Hildegard.
34b	8b	"Robo-Friend"	Shane Collins	Dustin Ferrer	Nondas Korodimos	April 10, 2015	210b	N/A
When Henry and Denzel argue over a comic book, Henry asks Cobby to build him a robot friend to replace Denzel.
35a	9a	"Henry Time"	Matthew Darragh	Alison McDonald	Andy Kelly	April 24, 2015	214a	1.07
Gertie and Henry's play date gets complicated when Gertie decides to run their activities on a strict schedule, so Gertie tries Henry Time.
35b	9b	"Rock, Rattle and Roller Practice"	Shane Collins	Maria O'Loughlin	Nondas Korodimos	April 24, 2015	214b	1.07
Henry offers to teach Momma how to roller-skate before the Roarsville roller disco.
36a	10a	"The Grr-Cloud"	Matthew Darragh	Kevin Del Aguila	David Frasquet	May 8, 2015	211a	1.15
Henry tries to keep a positive attitude when an event of bad things happen because of a big rain cloud. When he sings a happy tune in the rain, the cloud gets smaller.
36b	10b	"Monster Mama's Day"	Shane Collins	Maria O'Loughlin	Akis Dimitrakopoulos	May 8, 2015	211b	1.15
The monster kids help Momma buy a gift. When Momma receives a puffy mini-monster, it multiplies more and more and Henry finds a way to get them melodically.
37	11	"On the Huggleroad"	Matthew Darragh	Sascha Paladino	Andy Kelly	June 30, 2015	205	1.56
The Hugglemonster Family goes to Sonic Growl's reunion concert. However, they see Sonic Growl and their stranded tour bus on the way to Growlsberg.
38a	12a	"Roddy the Hero"	Shane Collins	Ashley Mendoza	Karim Gouyette	July 7, 2015	219a	1.59
Henry is mistaken for the hero when bad boy Roddy rescues Milo. So, Henry helps Roddy prove to be the real hero by teaching him how to be one.
38b	12b	"Never Enough Henrys"	Matthew Darragh	Ashley Mendoza	Nondas Korodimos	July 14, 2015	219b	1.51
Henry replicates himself using the Cobby Copytron when he realizes he has three simultaneous play-dates.
39a	13a	"All About Summer Camp"	Matthew Darragh	Kevin del Aguila	Mick Harrison	July 21, 2015	215a	1.51
The kids go to Rock and Roar Music Camp; Summer and Izzy compete to be the spotlight solo singer. Trouble erupts when all the campers get too competitive over their singing.
39b	13b	"Huggle...Whaaa?!"	Shane Collins	Ashley Mendoza	Tom Nesbitt	July 28, 2015	215b	1.50
Henry and the gang pitch in for Momma's birthday party, but then the whole town realizes that Roddy spat out a cuss word that citizens should not swear. This disappoints Momma when she heard Henry cussed out in front of her.
40a	14a	"Roar-Plane Racing"	Shane Collins	Dustin Ferrer	Juan Carlos Moreno	August 3, 2015	213a	1.54
Henry competes in an invitational bi-annual Roar-Plane Race with his idol, Captain Hollander, to be the best flying aces, but his friends believe that Hollander's stories of being a great pilot are never true.
40b	14b	"Hugglemonster and Son"	Matthew Darragh	Kevin del Aguila	David Schwartz	August 10, 2015	213b	1.16
Henry and Daddo are convinced to enter the parent and child competition "Monster-a-Muck Contest".
41	15	"Huggleween Moon"	Niamh Sharkey	Robert Vargas	Akis Dimitrakopoulos	October 2, 2015	216	1.19
During Cobby's first Huggleween party, Henry accidentally blasts his house into outer space and onto the Moon.
42a	16a	"Monster Scare Fair"	Matthew Darragh	Ashley Mendoza	Dan Nosella	October 19, 2015	212a	0.65
Henry confronts Denzel when he gets frightened at the Monster Scare Fair.
42b	16b	"Roarsville Rovers"	Shane Collins	Bradley Zwieg	Kelly James	October 19, 2015	212b	0.65
Henry encourages his Roarball team to continue after they lose their first game of the season.
43a	17a	"Monster in the Middle"	Matthew Darragh	Ashley Mendoza	Larry Scholl	October 26, 2015	218a	N/A
Summer and Denzel to assist Henry with a magic show for Estelle's birthday, but they accidentally get tied together and must attempt to set themselves free.
43b	17b	"The Good, the Bad, and the Monsterly"	Shane Collins	Maria O'Loughlin	Kinjo Estioko	October 26, 2015	218b	N/A
Henry introduces a new, yet large three eyed classmate, Rhett, and everyone is afraid of him based only on his looks. When Rhett grabs Mr. Duggles, Estelle thinks the toy is broken and Gertie thinks Denzel has Posttraumatic stress.
44a	18a	"Scout's Honor"	Shane Collins	Maria O'Loughlin	Garrett O'Donoghue	November 2, 2015	217a	0.83
At a day of camping, Roddy proves to change his ways to be a leader because he felt that something isn't right inside him.
44b	18b	"Home Sweet Hugglehome"	Matthew Darragh	Maria O'Loughlin	Carlos Ramos	November 2, 2015	217b	0.83
Henry and Denzel swap each other in their own houses, and Denzel seemed to have fun in the Hugglemonster house, but not Henry in the Dugglemonster house, and that makes it a monster child-swap.
45a	19a	"Working Monster"	Matthew Darragh	Matthew Darragh	Akis Dimitrakopoulos	November 9, 2015	220a	0.87
Momma has been announced that she is going be a musician in all the venues in town, but Henry struggles to get her attention to be close to her.
45b	19b	"Denzel Moves Away"	Shane Collins	Clara Phelan	David Frasquet	November 9, 2015	220b	0.87
When Henry realizes about the Dugglemonsters moving away, he sets up a going away party at the Monster Wave Park with all of his friends supporting them.
46a	20a	"Ivor's Birthday Bash"	Matthew Darragh	Maria O'Loughlin	Mick Harrison	November 16, 2015	221a	0.87
It's Ivor's birthday, and the Hugglemonsters plan in a birthday party for him, but doesn't like what he expected it to be.
46b	20b	"Huggle Bubbles"	Shane Collins	Maria O'Loughlin	Andrea Rania	November 16, 2015	221b	0.87
It is spring-cleaning day, and the whole town, especially Henry and his family, perform spring cleaning around the town. Henry intrdouces the town a bubble machine, which generates super strong and bouncy bubbles that are hard to pop. Problems arise when the bubbles collect most of the monsters’ belongings, including a giant statue of Signor Roartonio. What will Henry do to make all the bubbles pop?
47a	21a	"Good Morning, Roarsville"	Matthew Darragh	Kevin del Aguila	Kinjo Estioko	November 23, 2015	222a	0.70
Henry joins a Roarsville morning radio station called K-GROWL where he becomes a radio DJ.
47b	21b	"Daycare Breakout"	Matthew Darragh	Bradley Zwieg	Garrett O'Donoghue	November 23, 2015	222b	0.70
When all of the monster infants breakout during Ivor and Hugo's first day of daycare, it's up to Henry, Denzel, and Estelle to capture all of them.
48a	22a	"The Abominable Snowball"	Shane Collins	Ashely Mendoza	Akis Dimitrakopoulos	November 28, 2015	223a	0.90
The Hugglemonsters discover a very massive snowball on Mount Roarsome while playing in the snow with their friends. They then compete to determine who can create the best snowball in Roarsville.
48b	22b	"The Very Special Henry Hugglemas TV Special"	Niamh Sharkey	Robert Vargas	Jose Antonio Cerro	November 28, 2015	223b	0.90
Henry hosts a variety television show with his family and his friends on Christmas with laughter, jokes, and favorite carols like "Deck Your Horns" (A parody of Deck the Halls), "Jingle Howls" (A parody of Jingle Bells), and "We Wish You a Happy Hugglemas" (A parody of We Wish You a Merry Christmas).
49a	23a	"Is a Fella Isabella?"	Matthew Darragh	Allie McDonald	Andy Kelly	November 30, 2015	209a	0.82
When Roddy rips Summer's autograph of Isabella Roarson in her room, he and Henry help each other out to make Denzel look like Isabella and take a photo that looks similar to the original photo.
49b	23b	"Dudes' Day Off with Daddo"	Shane Collins	Bradley Zweig	Ilya Skorupsky	November 30, 2015	209b	0.82
Henry fakes being sick so he can spend the day with his father.
