= Henry Hugglemonster =

Animated preschool show

- Created by: Niamh Sharkey
- Based on: I'm a Happy Hugglewug by Niamh Sharkey
- Developed by: Sascha Paladino
- Voices of: Lara Jill Miller; Lori Alan; Tom Kenny; Kari Wahlgren; Hynden Walch; Chiara Zanni; Cree Summer; Grey DeLisle
- Theme music composer: Matt Mahaffey; Sascha Paladino
- Composer: Matt Mahaffey
- Countries of origin: United States; Ireland
- Original language: English
- No. of seasons: 2
- No. of episodes: 49 (list of episodes)

Production
- Running time: 22 minutes (two 11-minute segments)
- Production company: Brown Bag Films

Original release
- Network: Disney Junior
- Release: April 15, 2013 – November 30, 2015

Henry Hugglemonster is an animated children's television series produced by Brown Bag Films and based on the 2005 book I'm a Happy Hugglewug written and illustrated by Niamh Sharkey. The series premiered on Disney Junior in the United Kingdom on February 8, 2013, and in the United States on April 15. It was aired in 2013 on the afternoon Disney Junior segment on Disney Channel in United States and Canada. It ended on November 30, 2015, on Disney Junior. 49 episodes (94 segments) were produced over two seasons.

== Premise ==
The show revolves around a young yellow monster named Henry Hugglemonster and his family, who live in a village called Roarsville. Other places characters come from include Growlsberg and Growltown. Henry has a best friend named Denzel Dugglemonster and a monsterette friend named Gertie Growlerstein. Henry's experiences with his family and friends often lead to trouble, so Henry must use his problem-solving skills to find a way to resolve the conflicts he is presented with in his daily life. This gives him the opportunity to learn valuable lessons every day. Every episode features one or more original songs.

Common Sense Media stated that many of the episodes include "basic preschool skills like counting and sequences".

== Episodes ==
Season	Segments	Episodes	Originally released	
Season	Segments	Episodes	First released	Last released
1	50	26	April 15, 2013	May 2, 2014
2	44	23	October 24, 2014	November 30, 2015

== Characters ==
The characters in the series are primarily monsters and their pets (called Monsterpets).

=== The Hugglemonster family ===
- Henry Hugglemonster (voiced by Lara Jill Miller) is a 5-year-old, yellow monster whose horns resemble those of a jester's cap. He never backs down from a problem, because he believes he, his family, and his friends can "always find a way." His favorite sport is huggleball, which is similar to soccer, except that it is legal to carry the ball into the goal, and the ball sticks to the monsters' skin.
- Summer Hugglemonster (voiced by Hynden Walch) is Henry's 7-year-old sister. Her hobbies include putting on plays, music, and cheerleading.
- Cobby Hugglemonster (voiced by Chiara Zanni) is Henry's 8-year-old brother. He is an inventor, and his inventions sometimes come in handy in solving problems.
- Ivor Hugglemonster (voiced by Kari Wahlgren) is the baby of the family, who is now one year old, but cannot yet talk or fly.
- Daddo Hugglemonster (voiced by Tom Kenny) is a green monster mailman who can be a bit forgetful at times. He is skilled at juggling, which he often does when making dinner.
- Grando Hugglemonster (voiced by Tom Kenny) is the husband of Nan-Oh, father of Daddo, and paternal grandfather of Cobby, Summer, Henry and Ivor, who is often seen to be the most laid back of the family.
- Swifty Hugglemonster is the grandfather of Grando, the great-grandfather of Daddo, the great-great-grandfather of Cobby, Summer, Henry, and Ivor, and former mayor of Roarsville.
- Momma Hugglemonster (voiced by Lori Alan) is a pink monsterette and a talented musician who plays multiple instruments. She is the wife of Daddo and the mother of Cobby, Summer, Henry and Ivor.
- Nan-Oh Hugglemonster (voiced by Grey DeLisle) is the wife of Grando, mother of Daddo and paternal grandmother of Cobby, Summer, Henry, and Ivor.
- Beckett Hugglemonster is the Hugglemonster family's pet monster dog.
- Harry Hugglemonster (voiced by Jessica DiCicco) is Henry's cousin who has four arms and red skin.
- Dexter Hugglemonster (voiced by Tom Kenny) is Henry's uncle and Harry's father. Dexter is Daddo's older brother.
- Dee Hugglemonster (voiced by Jessica DiCicco) is Henry's aunt and Harry's mother.

=== The Dugglemonster family ===
- Denzel Dugglemonster (voiced by Cree Summer) is Henry's 7-year-old best friend. He appears fearful and anxious at times but always looks up to Henry whenever trouble occurs in the town. When he feels frightened, he digs a hole and hides inside it.
- Herold Dugglemonster (voiced by Rob Paulsen) is the father of Denzel who works as a baker.
- Maude Dugglemonster (voiced by Cree Summer) is the mother of Denzel and the wife of Herold.
- Grammo Dugglemonster (voiced by Cree Summer) is the grandmonster of Denzel.
- Gurgler Dugglemonster is the Dugglemonster's blue pet monster dog.
- Denzel 3000 (voiced by Cree Summer) is a robot resembling Denzel Dugglemonster that was created by Cobby.

=== The Growlerstein family ===
- Gertie Growlerstein (voiced by Grey Griffin) is Henry's intelligent monsterette friend with orange skin and yellow swirls around her body. She claims to never make mistakes.
- Milo Growlerstein (voiced by Hynden Walch) is Gertie's little brother. Milo feels that he is too young for anything than an older monster can do, yet he idolizes Henry as a big brother because he seems to always be there when he needs it.
- Gregor Growlerstein (voiced by Tom Kenny) is the father of Gertie and Milo who works as a comic book vendor.
- Joyce Growlerstein (voiced by Hynden Walch) is the loving mother of Gertie and Milo.
- Sneezo Growlerstein is the Growlerstein's female pet monster bird who sneezes often. She is allergic to monsterflowers.

=== The Enormomonster family ===
- Estelle Enormomonster (voiced by Grey Griffin) is Henry's large, energetic, and optimistic friend. She appears much taller than Henry, in spite of being younger than him, not turning 5 years old until the second season.
- Eduardo Enormomonster (voiced by Brian Blessed) is Estelle and Hugo's father. He serves as assistant scoutmaster to Daddo, and he also has an older brother even bigger than he is.
- Ernestine Enormomonster (voiced by Brenda Blethyn), is Estelle and Hugo's mother and the wife of Eduardo.
- Hugo Enormonster (voiced by Cree Summer) is Estelle's younger brother.
- Josh Enormomonster is Estelle and Hugo's uncle and the older brother of Eduardo. He has red skin with yellow and green stripes in his belly and yellow horns with green polka dots on his head.
- Flopster Enormomonster is Estelle's purple monster dog.

=== The Snifflemonster family ===
- Izzy Snifflemonster (voiced by Kari Wahlgren) is a yellow-purple monsterette who is one of Summer's friends. She has six purple horns on her head. She has sneezing issues, similar to Sneezo.
- Roberto Snifflemonster (voiced by Grey Griffin) is a teal monster that has four horns and a dark teal stripe around his stomach. He is one of Henry's closest friends and is slightly shorter than him. He is the fourth member of the Monster Scouts.
- Oscar Snifflemonster (voiced by Cree Summer) is a tall green monster who has three yellow triangular horns with green stripes on it, and a yellow stripe around his body. He also has freckles like other monsters, except Henry. He is friends with Cobby and Gertie.
- Roy (voiced by Grey Griffin) and Kelly Snifflemonster (voiced by Hynden Walch) are two short yellow monster twins who only have one fang, like Ivor and Hugo, and are Henry and Milo's friends.

=== The Blobbymonster family ===
- Fergus Blobbymonster is Henry's friend who does not speak, but only babbles and gargles. He has light blue skin with pink polka dots around his body.
- Fergal Blobbymonster is Fergus's dad, who has darker skin than him. Just like Fergus, he never speaks, but babbles. In an episode, he and Fergus are eating ice cream when he accidentally dropped his on Fergus' head.

=== Recurring ===
- Roddy Cloudmonster (voiced by Tara Strong) is Henry's mean red friend who can produce clouds using his breath, in which they can be used to hover around. He is a red monster with a blue oval on his torso, along with a very long and spiky tail. He sometimes laughs, "rah-hah!" with excitement or as a part of teasing a monster, mainly Henry and his friends.
- Meg Munderclaw (voiced by Grey Griffin) is a light green monsterette with four yellow stripes in her body and long purple horns. She is Summer's friend.
- Matilda Munderclaw (voiced by Grey Griffin) is a monsterette photographer. She has green and yellow stripes in her body. Shakey Munderclaw is Meg's dog.
- Hildegard Howoooolermonster (voiced by Grey Griffin) is a glasses-wearing green-skinned teenage monsterette (Cobby calls her a "monster girl" in his song though) student who demonstrated a volcano that makes donuts at the science fair.
- Isabella Roarson (voiced by Geri Halliwell) is Summer's pop star idol. Summer claims to be her "number one fan" who had printed hundreds of copies of her autograph.
- Selena Songmonster (voiced by Grey Griffin) is the camp counselor of Rock N' Roar Music Camp. She is blue-skinned with lighter blue stripes in her belly, wears pink lipstick, and has two blue horns resembling long hair. In one episode, she praised Izzy over Summer during their overconfident competition, and picked her to sing in the Spotlight Solo.
- Mimi Monstermouth (voiced by Joan Rivers) is a wisecracking and talented pastry chef and a daycare teacher known for baking cakes, pies, and other desserts, who knows all about babies. She is purple-skinned and has blonde hair, whom may be the only monster known to have hair.
- Santa Claws is a chubby elderly monster who comes every Hugglemas, giving toys and gifts to good monsters.
- Mr. Growl (voiced by Tim Whitnall) is a judge from Grr Factor (which is a parody of The X Factor) who once visited the Hugglemonsters. He is light blue-skinned and has purple and blue zigzags on his torso.
- Mrs. Growlburg is a blue monsterette who works in the elementary school. She is Henry's teacher.
- Officer Higgins (voiced by Tom Kenny) is a light blue skinned monster who works as a patrol officer. He speaks in a Southern accent and a good friend to Henry.
- Mayor Roariani (voiced by Tara Strong) is a three-eyed blue monsterette who is the mayor of Roarsville. Prior to her was Swifty Hugglemonster. She once left Henry in charge upon realizing she had an emergency meeting in Growlsburg.
- Signor Roartonio (voiced by Tom Kenny) is a blue monster who is the owner of an Italian restaurant in Roarsville. He uses phrases from the Italian language and makes Italian cuisine.
- Mr. Winklemonster (voiced by Tom Kenny) is an indigo monster who sells toys in Roarsville. He wears a green bowler hat and glasses.
- The Operator (voiced by Rob Paulsen) is a big blue monster with red and cyan horns on his head and red and cyan stripes in his belly. He wears a red hat.
- Hollander (voiced by Rob Paulsen) is an airship pilot. He is blue striped skinned and has a green oval in his torso. He is hard of hearing and tends to mishear what others say to him. He speaks and sings in a tenor voice. He claims that his name is not Jerry and that he loves ducks.
- Irving (voiced by Grey Griffin) is the owner of the Pet Palace and once a bike shop in Roarsville. He has a round yellow stomach, striped red and yellow horns and has a yellow nose. He is also a talented musician who can play many instruments.
- Mini-Monsters are blue puffy puffball-like pets that bounce and make squeaky sounds; they have no mouth and green/blue striped horns on their heads.
- Three-Eyed Rhett (voiced by Diedrich Bader) is a yellow monster who Henry guides in Monsterschool. He is even larger than Estelle, and as his name suggests, he has three eyes. He wears a cowboy hat with false horns to hide that he has no natural horns.
- The Mighty Roarhammer (voiced by Tom Kenny) is a superhero from a comic that Henry and his friends love to read.
- Sonic Growl is a rock group who performed one of their greatest hits "Follow Your Monsterdream" with the Hugglemonster family. The members of the group are:
  - Shred (lead guitar, voiced by Jess Harnell)
  - Fred (bass guitar, voiced by Rob Paulsen)
  - Ted (drums, voiced by Tom Kenny)
- Ben (voiced by Cree Summer) is one of the first background monsterkids in the series. He is a purple monster with an orange oval on torso, along with five yellow circles, orange/yellow striped horns on his head, dark blue wings, and a red nose.
- Stanley is another of the many background monsterkids in the series. He is an orange monster who has blue horns on his head and blue polka dots around his body. His monsterly appearance is also similar to that of a dinosaur and lizard.
- Kayla (voiced by Grey Griffin) is another one of the many background monsterkids in the series. She is a light green monsterette with pink and blue stripes on her belly, pink horns on her head, yellow nose, pink wings, aqua tutu, and a blue Mary Janes shoes.
- Frank (voiced by Cree Summer) is another one of the background monsterkids in the series. He is a teal monster with an orange oval on torso, along with five yellow circles, orange/yellow striped horns on his head, dark blue wings, and a red nose.
- Mike (voiced by Hynden Walch) is another one of the background monsterkids in the series. He is apricot monster with yellow-and-orange stripes on his belly, yellow-and-orange striped horns on his head, orange wings, and a red nose.
- Tommy (voiced by Hynden Walch) is a playful little indigo monster who resembles Milo.
- Jerry (voiced by Cree Summer) is another one of the background monsterkids in the series. She is a green monster with an blue and yellow stripes on her belly, blue and yellow striped horns on his head, yellow nose, dark blue wings, and a red wavy shorts with an tail.
- Mr. Furrymonster (voiced by Tom Kenndy) is another monster, Ben and Kayla's father, who has of the background in the series. He has a pink monster with an blue-and-red stripes on her belly, blue and red striped horns on his head, dark red nose, blue wings, blue bow on his neck, and a black top hat with an blue-and-dark red striped on his head.
- Mrs. Furrymonster (voiced by Grey Griffin) is another monsterette, Ben and Kayla's mother, who has blue monsterette in the series. He is a blue monsterrette with an yellow and pink stripes on her belly, yellow and pink striped horns on his head, pink nose, pink lip on his mouth, and a blue shoes.
- Grandpa Furrymonster (Tom Kenndy) is a grandmonster, Ben and Kayla's grandfather, who has a blue monster with an blue oval on torso, along with five yellow circles, blue and yellow striped horns with bobbles, blue mustache, red glasses, and yellow nose.
- Grandma Furrymonster (voiced by Grey Griffin) is a grandmonster, Ben and Kayla's grandmother, who has an purple monster with an light purple-and-purple striped horns on her head, with bobbles, purple nose, and a red glasses.

== Production ==
Development of the series was announced in December 2011, when Disney EMEA's London-based production studio had teamed up with Irish animation production company Brown Bag Films to develop & produce an adaptation of Niamh Sharkey's book series I'm a Happy Hugglewug into a preschool television series originally entitled The Happy Hugglemonsters to air on its Disney Junior channels globally in Autumn 2012.

=== Animation ===
Brown Bag Films handle storyboard, story development & overall production at its in-house animation studio in Dublin, Ireland, while Singaporian animation production studio Sparky Animation handled CGI animation production services.

== Home media ==
Home media is distributed by Walt Disney Studios Home Entertainment.

DVD releases
Title	Release date	Episode count	Episodes	Additional features
Henry Hugglemonster: Meet the Hugglemonsters	January 14, 2014	6	"The Huggleflower" / "Monster Lullaby" (Season 1, Episode 1); "Astrobrix" / "The Sore Roar" (Season 1, Episode 2); "Promises Promises" / "Fireworks Night" (Season 1, Episode 9); "The Hugglejuice Stand" / "The Huggledance Party" (Season 1, Episode 8); "Carried Away" / "Monster in Charge" (Season 1, Episode 13); "Monsterpet Pageant" / "Ivor's First Stomp" (Season 1, Episode 16)	3 Monstrous Iron-On Decals; Bonus Episode of Sheriff Callie's Wild West
Henry Hugglemonster: Roarsome Tales	August 26, 2014	6	"Bye Bye Beckett" / "Pet Party" (Season 1, Episode 5); "Number One Fan" / "Henry's Hugglefish" (Season 1, Episode 6); "Sneez-O-Rama" / "The Huggleball Game" (Season 1, Episode 7); "Paint the Town" / "Henry, Incorporated" (Season 1, Episode 10); "Monsters on the Town" / "Enormo Henry" (Season 1, Episode 11); "Monster Seeds" / "Henry and the Snow-Grrr" (Season 1, Episode 24)	
