= Gerard Whelan =

Gerard Whelan (born 1957) is an Irish writer.

== Career overview ==
Whelan was born in Enniscorthy, County Wexford, and has lived and worked in several European countries. After some time living in Dublin, he has returned to live in his native Wexford. He is the author of many books for children and is a multiple award-winner. He has also written the non-fiction book Spiked: Church, State Intrigue and the Rose Tattoo and edited the anthology, Big Pictures. He is married and has 1 son called Davy.

The Guns of Easter, A Winter of Spies and War Children are historical novels based on the Irish struggle for independence in the early 20th century, while Dream Invader and Out of Nowhere are fantasy novels.

== Bibliography ==
- The Guns of Easter (O'Brien Press, 1996)
- Dream Invader (O'Brien, 1997)
- A Winter of Spies (O'Brien, 1998)
- Big Pictures (editor) (LETS, 1998)
- Out of Nowhere (O'Brien, 1999)
- War Children (O'Brien, 2002)
- Spiked: Church, State Intrigue and the Rose Tattoo (New Island, 2002)

== Awards ==
- The Guns of Easter won the Eilís Dillon Memorial Award for first-time writers and a Merit Award at the 1997 Bisto Book of the Year Awards
- Dream Invader won Book of the Year at the 1998 Bisto Book of the Year Awards
- War Children won a Merit Award at the 2003 Bisto Book of the Year Awards
