= Marie-Louise Fitzpatrick =

Irish writer and illustrator

- Born: 2 March 1962 (age 64); Dublin, Ireland
- Citizenship: IrishAdvanced Special characters Help Cite Heading Format Insert
- Education: College of Marketing and Design
- Occupations: Writer, illustrator
- Spouse: Michael Emberley
- Writing career
- Language: English
- Years active: 1988–present
- Notable works: Izzy and Skunk, You, Me and the Big Blue Sea, There, Hagwitch
- Notable awards: 10 CBI Book of the Year Awards
- Website: marielouisefitzpatrick.com

Marie-Louise Fitzpatrick (born 2 March 1962) is an Irish writer and illustrator best known for children's novels. She has won 10 CBI Book of the Year Awards (formerly Bisto Awards), including 4 awards for Book of the Year.

== Works ==
=== Picture books ===
- An Chanáil (1988) — Bisto Book of the Decade Award, Readers Association of Ireland Book Award, Irish Book Awards Design Medal
- The Sleeping Giant (1991) — Bisto Merit Award
- The Long March (1999) — Bisto Merit Award, RAI Special Merit Award; also named a Smithsonian Notable Book and IBBY Honour Book (illustration)
- Izzy and Skunk (2000) — Bisto Book of the Year (shared)
- Lizzy and Skunk (2000)
- I'm a Tiger Too (2000) — Premier of Queensland recommended read
- You, Me and the Big Blue Sea (2002) — Bisto Book of the Year, Eason Book of the Month August 2003
- Silly Mummy, Silly Daddy (2006)
- I Am I (2006)
- Silly Mommy, Silly Daddy (2006)
- Silly School (2006)
- There (2009) — Bisto Book of the Year, Bisto Illustration Honour Award, Eric Carle Museum Best Picture Books of 2009 choice
- Silly Baby (2010)

=== Novels ===
- Timecatcher (2010) — Dubray Books Book of the Month, May 2010
- Dark Warning (2012) — CBI Book of the Year Honour Award for Fiction
- Hagwitch (2013) — CBI Book of the Year and Fiction Honour Award
- On Midnight Beach (2020) — CILIP Carnegie Medal Shortlist
- Sisters of the Moon (2024)
- The Museum of Lost Umbrellas (2025)
