= Poolbeg Press =

Irish book publisher

- Founded: 1976
- Country of origin: Ireland
- Headquarters location: Baldoyle, Dublin
- Publication types: Books
- Fiction genres: Literary fiction, romantic fiction, non-fiction, children's fiction
- Imprints: Ward River Press
- Official website: poolbeg.com

Poolbeg Press is an Irish book publisher established in 1976.

== Genres ==
Poolberg Press publishes romantic fiction, literary fiction and non-fiction as well as children's fiction.

== Authors ==
Authors published by Poolbeg Press include Maeve Binchy, Patricia Scanlan, Marian Keyes, Cathy Kelly, Sheila O'Flanagan, Colette Caddle, William Trevor and Melissa Hill. It is known for discovering and promoting new Irish writers, particularly female authors.

== Imprints ==
In 2014, Poolbeg Press brought back Ward River Press, an imprint for contemporary Irish fiction.
