= Niamh Sharkey =

Author and illustrator

- Born: 1973 (age 52–53)
- Known for: Henry Hugglemonster
- Awards: Laureate na nÓg (2012)

Niamh Sharkey (born 1973) is an Irish author and illustrator of children’s picture books.

== Life ==
Sharkey was interested in reading and illustration at a young age.

Sharkey was a freelance illustrator and designer in Dublin after graduating with a degree in visual communication from the Dublin College of Marketing and Design. While living in Hobart, Tasmania, she illustrated her first full colour picture book.

She was named Laureate na nÓg in 2012.

Her books have been translated into 20 languages. She is a member of Illustrators Ireland. She is a co-founder of Towers and Tales, a book festival focused on children's literature.

=== Animation ===
Her book I’m a Happy Hugglewug was adapted into the animated pre-school series Henry Hugglemonster for Disney Television Animation. Sharkey is co creator of Disney's animated series Eureka! which premiered in 2022.

== Awards ==
- Laureate na nÓg
- Mother Goose Award for best new illustrator
- Irish Book Awards Bisto Book of the Year, Tales of Wisdom and Wonder
- Irish Book Awards Bisto Book of the Year, The Gigantic Turnip
- 2010 Irish Book Awards Junior Book of the Year, On The Road With Mavis And Marge
- 2019 Children's Books Ireland/Tyrone Guthrie Centre bursary

== Bibliography ==
- Irish Legends For The Very Young (1996, Mercier Press, ISBN 9781856351447)
- Tales From Old Ireland (2000, Barefoot Books, ISBN 9781902283975)
- Santasaurus (2004, Walker, ISBN 9780744583731)
- I'm A Happy Hugglewug (2006, Walker, ISBN 9781844280490)
- On The Road With Mavis And Marge (2010, Walker, ISBN 9781406321845)
- Cinderella
- The Ravenous Beast
- Jack And The Beanstalk
- The Gigantic Turnip
- Tales of Wisdom & Wonder

Cultural offices
Preceded by Siobhán Parkinson	Laureate na nÓg; 2012–2014	Succeeded by Eoin Colfer
