= The O'Brien Press =

Irish publishing house in Dublin

- Founded: 1974
- Founder: Michael O'Brien
- Country of origin: Ireland
- Headquarters location: Dublin
- Distribution: Gill Distribution
- Publication types: Books
- Nonfiction topics: Children's fiction, adult non-fiction
- Official website: obrien.ie

The O'Brien Press is an independent Irish publishing house based in Dublin. Founded in 1974 by Michael O'Brien, the company has become best known for its focus on children's literature and adult non-fiction.

== History ==
The O'Brien Press emerged from a family-run printing business and released its first titles in 1974 - a biography of Peadar O'Donnell, and Éamonn MacThomáis's first book Me Jewel and Darlin' Dublin.

During the 1990s, O'Brien Press expanded into children's publishing, launching influential titles like Under the Hawthorn Tree by Marita Conlon-McKenna, a landmark in Irish children's literature. The company adopted digital workflows early and maintained its independence despite acquisition offers from major publishing groups.

== Achievements ==
The company helped launch the career of Eoin Colfer, publishing his early Benny Shaw series and The Wish List (novel). It also published The General by Paul Williams, which was later adapted into The General (1998 film).

O'Brien publications have won multiple awards at the KPMG Children's Books Ireland Awards over the years. Several titles have also been selected for the prestigious White Ravens list by the International Youth Library, recognising outstanding international children's and youth literature.

== Brandon Imprint ==
The Brandon imprint, originally founded by Steve McDonogh, was acquired by O'Brien Press after McDonogh's death. Brandon has published works by Gerry Adams, Mary Morrissy, Alice Taylor (writer) and Frank McGuinness.

== Legacy ==
In 2023, the company donated its extensive publishing archive of manuscripts, artwork and early editions to the National Library of Ireland, to mark its 50th anniversary and to preserve its legacy for future generations.

== Notable Authors ==
- Marita Conlon-McKenna
- Eoin Colfer
- Éamonn MacThomáis
- Judi Curtin
- Gregory Maguire
- Pat Ingoldsby
- Paul Howard (a.k.a. Ross O'Carroll-Kelly)
- Oisín McGann
- Anna Carey
- Conor Kostick
- Elizabeth Shaw
- Gerry Hunt
- Daniel O'Donnell
- Shay Healy
- Brendan O'Carroll
- Elizabeth Shaw (artist)
- Gerard Whelan
- Maureen Potter
- Feargal Quinn
