= Oisín McGann =

Irish writer and illustrator, mainly speculative fiction for young people

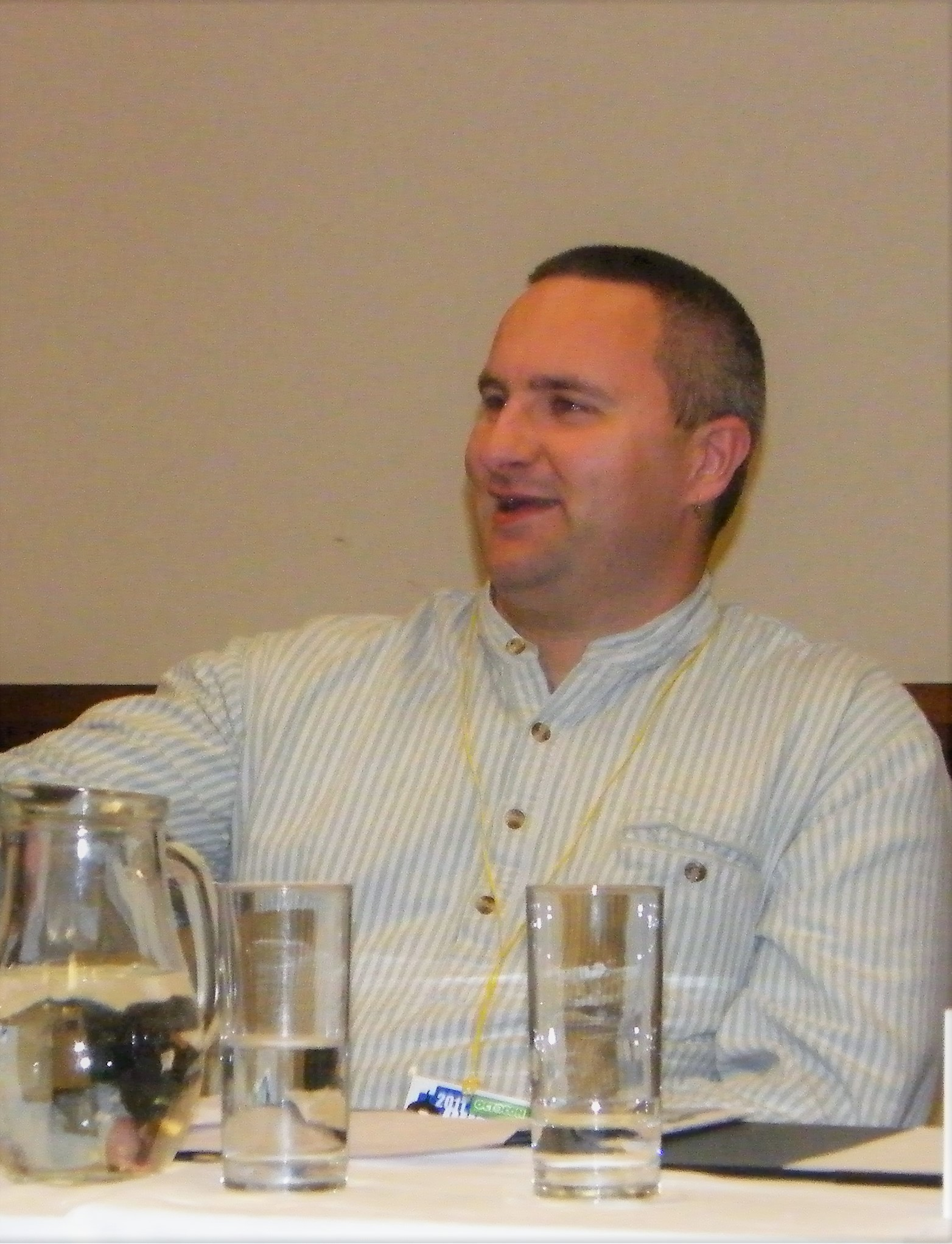
- Guest at Octocon, Ireland
- Born: Oisín McGann; 1973 (age 52–53); Ireland
- Occupations: Writer, illustrator

Oisín McGann (born 1973) is an Irish writer and illustrator, who writes in a range of genres for children and teenagers, mainly science fiction and fantasy, and has illustrated many of his own short story books for younger readers. As of 5 September 2022, his most recent book is about climate change.

== Biography ==
Oisín McGann was born in Dublin, Ireland in 1973 and spent most of his childhood living there and in Drogheda, County Louth. He had an interest in writing and illustrating from an early age, doing a foundation art course in Ballyfermot Senior College in 1990–1991, Dublin before joining a diploma course in animation at Dún Laoghaire School of Art and Design in 1991. He dropped out of college in 1992 to set up as a freelance illustrator/artist later becoming Background Layout Designer for Fred Wolf films in 1997. In February 1998, he left Dublin for London where he spent most of his time as an art director and copywriter in an advertising company. After four and a half years he returned to Ireland, initially working as a freelance illustrator, but now as a full-time author and illustrator. He is married with three children.

=== Publishing career ===
In 2003, his first two books in the Mad Grandad series for younger readers were released by the O'Brien Press of Dublin, followed by his first young adult novel, The Gods and their Machines in 2004. More Mad Grandad titles soon followed as well as two more young adult novels, The Harvest Tide Project and Under Fragile Stone (collectively known as the Archisan Tales). The Harvest Tide Project was actually the first novel McGann had written, but it was contracted as part of a three-novel deal, and his publishers chose to release The Gods and their Machines first.

In 2006, a new illustrated series, the Forbidden Files was published, for confident readers. In the same year, Random House's imprint Doubleday bought the rights to publish his next novel, the futuristic thriller Small-Minded Giants. In May 2007, Small-Minded Giants was recommended by the Education Secretary, Alan Johnson and the School Library Association in the UK on a one-off list of Top 160 Books For Boys. In November 2010, an extract from Small-Minded Giants was used as part of paper one of the English GCSE, By the Northern Ireland Council For the Curriculum, Exams and Awards (CCEA).

Since 2006, McGann has continued to publish with Random House/Penguin Random House. Ancient Appetites, a steampunk story set in nineteenth century Ireland, was released in July 2007, the first in McGann's Wildenstern Saga series. Strangled Silence, a conspiracy thriller set in London, was published in September 2008. The second Wildenstern Saga book, entitled The Wisdom of Dead Men, was published in 2009. The third Wildenstern book, Merciless Reason was released in March 2012. In 2012, he was commissioned to write a young children's book, published as "The Wolfling's Bite", as part of "The Nightmare Club" series, by Little Island, under the pseudonym, "Annie Graves". His novel, Rat-Runners, a crime thriller set in a near-future surveillance state was released in March 2013. In 2014, Penguin published two novels, "War's Harvest" and "Cruel Salvation", which he was commissioned to write, to tie in with the medieval fantasy online game, "Kings of the Realm".

== Bibliography ==
"Mad Grandad's Flying Saucer" (2003), O'Brien Press (for 6+) 9780862788223

"Mad Grandad's Robot Garden" (2003), O'Brien (for 6+) 9780862788216

"The Gods And Their Machines" (2004), O'Brien (novel) 9780862788339

"The Harvest Tide Project" (2004), O'Brien (novel) 9780862788346

"Under Fragile Stone" (2005), O'Brien (novel) 9780862788353

"Mad Grandad and the Mutant River" (2005), O'Brien (for 6+) 9780862789398

"Mad Grandad and the Kleptoes" (2005), O'Brien (for 6+) 9780862789381

"Small-Minded Giants" (2006), Random House (novel) 9780552554732

"The Evil Hairdo" (2006), O'Brien (for 8+) 9780862789404

"The Poison Factory" (2006), O'Brien (for 8+) 9780862789411

"Ancient Appetites" (2007), Random House (first novel in The Wildenstern Saga) 9780552554992

"Mad Grandad's Wicked Pictures" (2007), O'Brien Press (for 6+) 9781847170637

"The Goblin of Tara" (2007), Barrington Stoke (illustrated novella for reluctant readers) 9781842995143

"Strangled Silence" (2008), Random House (novel) 9780552558624

"Wired Teeth" (2008), O'Brien (for 8+) 9781847170033

"The Wisdom of Dead Men" (2009), Random House (second novel in The Wildenstern Saga) 9780552558655

"The Evil Eye" (2009), Barrington Stoke (illustrated novella for reluctant readers) 9781842996317

"The Baby Giant" (2009), O'Brien (for 5+) 9781847170880

"Armouron: The Armoured Ghost" (2010), Random House (novella for 9+) 9780553821161

"Armouron: Lying Eyes" (2010), Random House (novella for 9+) 9780553821178

"Mad Grandad’s Doppelganger" (2010), O’Brien (for 6+) 9781847171979

"Merciless Reason" (2012), Random House (third novel in The Wildenstern Saga) 9780552564854

"The Wolfling's Bite" (2012) (writing as Annie Graves), Little Island (for 6+) 9781908195302

"Rat Runners" (2013), Random House (novel) 9780552566209

"Get Yourself Gone" (2013) Franklin Watts (novella for reluctant readers) 9781445123158

"The Orphan Factory" (release date TBC – already released in Germany), Random House (novella for 9+)

"Dead End Junction" (release date TBC), Random House (novella for 9+)

"Kings of the Realm: War’s Harvest", (2014), Penguin (novel) 9780141348698

"Kings of the Realm: Cruel Salvation" (2014), Penguin (novel) 9780141348704

"Across the Cold Ground" (short story in the anthology "Beyond the Stars", 2014), HarperCollins 9780008103415

"The Drift Family at Dundrum" (2014), MK Illumination (picture book)

"The Last Dying Seconds" (2015), (part of the "Project X" series) Oxford University Press (8+) 9780198310693

"The Starving Darkness" (2015), (part of the "Project X" series) Oxford University Press (8+) 9780198330912

"Stream Time" (short story in the Laureate na nOg, Eoin Colfer's anthology "Once Upon a Place", 2015), Little Island 9781910411377

== Awards and recognition ==
2005: The Gods and Their Machines won a Bisto Children's Book of the Year Merit Award.

2005: The Gods and Their Machines and The Harvest Tide Project were both shortlisted for the Reading Association of Ireland Award – the first time an author had two books on the same shortlist.

2006: The Gods And Their Machines, published by Tor in the United States, shortlisted for Locus Magazine's Best First Novel Award.

2006: Under Fragile Stone shortlisted for the Bisto Children's Book of the Year Award.

2008: Ancient Appetites shortlisted for the Waterstone's Children's Book of the Year Award.

2008: Small-Minded Giants shortlisted for the Coventry Inspiration Book Award.

2009: Strangled Silence shortlisted for Falkirk Council's 2010 RED Book Award.

2011: The French edition of Ancient Appetites, Voraces, shortlisted for le Grand Prix de l'Imaginaire in the Young Adult (Foreign) Novel category.

2011: Voraces shortlisted for the Prix Imaginales 2011 in the Jeunesse category.

2012: Voraces shortlisted for les Mordus du Polar, a French award that focuses on mystery stories.

2012: "The Wildenstern Saga" as a series, long-listed (one of ten titles) for the Grand Prix de l'Imaginaire in the Young Adult (Foreign) Novel category.

2012: "The Wolfling’s Bite", as part of the Nightmare Club series, chosen for the UNESCO Dublin City of Literature Special Reading Programme.

2014: "Rat Runners" shortlisted for Falkirk Council's 2015 RED Book Award.

2014: McGann was awarded the European Science Fiction Society Award, for Best Creator of Children's Science Fiction and Fantasy Books. It's given to a writer in recognition of recent works, but not for a particular book.

2014: The anthology, "Stories of WW1", featuring McGann's story, "The Murder Machine", was one of seventeen titles chosen by Booktrust in the UK for its nationwide Bookbuzz programme, to encourage reading for pleasure in schools.

2015: The anthology, "Beyond the Stars", featuring McGann's story, "Across the Cold Ground" (which he also illustrated), was shortlisted for the CBI Book of the Year Award.

2015: The anthology, "Once Upon a Place", featuring McGann's story, "Stream Time", was shortlisted for the Bord Gáis Energy Irish Book Awards in the Senior Children's Book of the Year category.

2015: The Centre for Literacy in Primary Education (CLPE), chose "Once Upon a Place" as one of their best books of the year.
