= Under the Hawthorn Tree (novel) =

1990 Irish children's novel

- First edition
- Author: Marita Conlon-McKenna
- Language: English
- Series: Children of the Famine
- Genre: Children's books, Historical fiction
- Media type: Print
- Followed by: Wildflower Girl

Under the Hawthorn Tree is a children's historical novel by Marita Conlon-McKenna, the first in her Children of the Famine trilogy set at the time of the Great Famine in Ireland. It was published by the O'Brien Press in May 1990. It was adapted for television in 1999.

== Plot summary ==
The novel tells the story of three siblings, Mary Ellen (Eily), Michael and Margaret (Peggy) O'Driscoll, who live in a small cottage in their home district of Duneen. Ireland is in the height of The Great Hunger. Blight has destroyed the staple crop. Ten month old Bridget dies of famine fever and is buried under the hawthorn tree in the garden: in Irish mythology, the hawthorn is linked with the otherworld.

Their father has gone to find work on the famine roads, and the children and their mother struggle each day, barely getting enough food to survive. Their mother ends up selling all of her belongings except for the clothes on their backs. Desperate and worried that she won't be able to feed her children alone, she leaves to search for her husband. After waiting for their parents for a few days, the three siblings are forced to leave for the workhouse. Eily makes a decision; they would make the long journey to find Nano and Lena, the aunts from their mother's stories. The journey ahead is dangerous and the children are weak, but they are determined to make it to Castletaggart where their aunts are living and running a bakery.

== Reception ==
Under the Hawthorn Tree received the Children's and Young Adult's Book Award for Older Reader Category in 1991. The book was enormously popular in Ireland, and remains Ireland's best-selling children's book.

== Translations ==
The book, originally written in English, has been translated into Irish, French, Dutch, German, Spanish, Danish, Swedish, Italian, Japanese, Persian, Malay, Arabic and Korean.

== Television adaptation ==
Under the Hawthorn Tree was filmed for Channel 4 and screened as a four-part series in March 1999.

== Sequels ==
- Wildflower Girl, the second part of the trilogy, in which Peggy goes to America
- Fields of Home, the third part of the trilogy, which follows all three siblings; Eily and Michael at home in Ireland, and Peggy as she heads out West in the US.
