= One (Crossan novel) =

2015 young adult novel by Sarah Crossan

- First edition cover
- Author: Sarah Crossan
- Language: English
- Genre: Young adult novel
- Publisher: Bloomsbury Publishing (UK), Greenwillow Books (US)
- Publication date: 2015
- Publication place: Ireland
- Media type: Print
- Pages: 448
- Awards: Carnegie Medal
- ISBN: 978-1-408-86311-4

One is a 2015 young adult novel by Irish author Sarah Crossan. The book was published by Bloomsbury Publishing on 27 August 2015.

The novel won the Carnegie Medal for 2016. It was also nominated for the Deutscher Jugendliteraturpreis in its German translation.

The plot of the book is about the life and survival of Tippi and Grace, two sisters who are ischiopagus tripus conjoined twins. The book was written following Crossan's research on twins and the book refers to past examples of conjoined twins. It focuses on themes of identity and loss.

Awards
Preceded by Buffalo Soldier	Carnegie Medal recipient 2016	Succeeded by Salt to the Sea
