= Patricia Forde =

Irish children's author

Patricia Forde (born c. 1960) is a former director of the Galway Arts Festival and an Irish children's author.

Forde was raised in Market Street, Galway, a fluent Irish speaker. She became a member of An Taibhdhearc at age ten, both acting and directing its plays over the following ten years. She spent ten years as a primary school teacher, and was one of the early members of Macnas. Macnas co-founder, Pádraic Breathnach, encouraged her work on stories for Macnas's street performances. While working with Macnas, she took a year's leave from teaching to write her first book, Tír faoi Thoinn. However, an opportunity to become director of the Galway Arts Festival (proposed by Ollie Jennings in 1990) meant that she never returned to teaching.

She left the arts festival role in 1995, subsequently working in Ros na Rún, Aifric and RTÉ soap Fair City.

Forde's other work has included a creative programme for children at the festival, which developed into the Baboró International Arts Festival for Children.

She is married with two children and lives in Moycullen.

== Bibliography ==
- Tír faoi Thoinn/Land Under the Sea, 1990
- The King’s Secret, O’Brien Press, 1992
- Frogs Do Not Like Dragons, Egmont, March 2010
- Hedgehogs Do Not Like Heights, Egmont, 2011
- Ceitidh Ceare, 2011
- Binji: Madra Ar Strae, 2011
- The Wordsmith / The List, Little Island Books, 2014
- Witches Do Not Like Bicycles, Egmont, 2015
- Bumpfizzle The Best on Planet Earth, Little Island Books, June 2018
