= Marita Conlon-McKenna =

Irish writer of children's books (born 1956)

- Born: 5 November 1956 (age 69)
- Education: Convent of the Sacred Heart, Mount Anville
- Occupation: Writer
- Spouse: James McKenna
- Children: 4
- Writing career
- Language: English
- Period: 1990-present
- Subjects: Historical fiction, children's fiction
- Notable work: Under the Hawthorn Tree
- Notable awards: Bisto Irish Book of the Year Award International Reading Association Award Reading Association of Ireland Award
- Website: www.maritaconlonmckenna.com

Marita Conlon-McKenna (born 5 November 1956) is an Irish author of children's books and adult fiction. She is best known for her Famine-era historical children's book Under the Hawthorn Tree, the first book of the Children of the Famine trilogy, which was published in 1990 and achieved immediate success. Praised for its child-accessible yet honest depiction of the Great Famine, Under the Hawthorn Tree has been translated into over a dozen languages and is taught in classrooms worldwide. Conlon-McKenna went on to be a prolific writer and has published over 20 books for both young readers and adults. Her debut adult novel Magdalen was published in 1999.

== Biography ==
Conlon-McKenna was born in Dublin and raised in Goatstown. She attended school at the Convent of the Sacred Heart in Mount Anville. She excelled at school but deferred a place at university to care for her father.

She married James McKenna at age 20 and had jobs in the family business, in a bank, and with a travel agency. She took an interest in writing and enrolled in writing classes in UCD, including courses in Anglo-Irish literature, women's studies and children's literature.

While a mother of young children, she began writing a picture book for her daughter. She credits Dr Pat Donlon, director of the Children's Literature course, with encouraging and supporting her to publish her work. The inspiration for her first children's novel Under the Hawthorn Tree came when she heard a radio report on the discovery of an unmarked grave under a hawthorn tree, where three children from the Famine era were buried. Under the Hawthorn Tree was a worldwide success and sold over 250,000 copies in the Irish market alone, earning its status as a classic children's novel.

Conlon-McKenna went on to write more books for young readers. Her characters are often depicted in challenging situations or life events. Among her historical children's books are Safe Harbour, set during World War II, which was shortlisted for the Bisto Book of the Year Award, and two follow-up books to Under the Hawthorn Tree: Wildflower Girl and Fields of Home, which completed the Children of the Famine trilogy. Other children's books include The Blue Horse, which won the Bisto Irish Book of the Year Award and reached the top of the bestseller's list in 1993, No Goodbye, and A Girl Called Blue.

Her debut novel for adults, The Magdalen, was a number-one bestseller in 1999, telling the story of a young pregnant woman sent to a Magdalene Laundry in 1950s Ireland. Conlon-McKenna said that she naturally made a shift from children to adult's writing when she decided to write a story about the Magdalene Laundries. This subject interested her because of her personal adoption story.

Conlon-McKenna carried out extensive historical research for her 1916-era novel Rebel Sisters. Based on real-life Gifford sisters Nellie, Muriel and Grace, who were involved in the 1916 Rising in Dublin, Rebel Sisters became a number-one bestseller when it was released in 2016 on the centenary year of the 1916 Rising.

In 2020, Conlon-McKenna published The Hungry Road, a historical novel set in Skibbereen, County Cork during the Great Famine. Published 30 years after Under the Hawthorn Tree, The Hungry Road was inspired partly by the diaries of Dr Daniel Donovan, a dispensary doctor in the Skibbereen Workhouse during the 1840s.

Marita and her husband James have four children and they live in Stillorgan in County Dublin. She is a promoter of the arts and was the chairperson of Irish PEN.

== Works ==
Children of the Famine series

- Under the Hawthorn Tree (1990), illustrated by Donald Teskey
- Wildflower Girl (1991), illustrated by Donald Teskey
- Fields of Home (1996), illustrated by Donald Teskey

Children's novels

- The Blue Horse (1992), illustrated by Donald Teskey
- Safe Harbour (1995)
- No Goodbye (1997)
- In Deep Dark Wood (1999)
- A Girl Called Blue (2003)
- Love, Lucie (2012)

Novels

- The Magdalen (1999)
- Promised Land (2000)
- Miracle Woman (2002)
- The Stone House (2004)
- The Hat Shop on the Corner (2006)
- The Matchmaker (2008)
- Mother of the Bride (2010)
- A Taste for Love (2011)
- Three Women (2012)
- The Rose Garden (2013)
- Rebel Sisters (2016)
- The Hungry Road (2020)

Novellas

- The Snow Globe (2014)

Picture books

- Little Star (1993), illustrated by Christopher Coady
- The Very Last Unicorn (1995), illustrated by Christopher Coady
- Granny MacGinty (1999), illustrated by Leonie Shearing

Short stories

- Good Girl (2001)

== Awards ==
Under the Hawthorn Tree

- International Reading Association Award (US, 1991)
- Reading Association of Ireland Award (1993)
- Frankfurt Book Fair Children's Choice Book Prize (Germany, 1993)
- 'Austrian Children and Youth Book Prize (1994)
- Shortlisted - City of Poitiers European Grand Prize for Children's Novels (France, 1994)

Wildflower Girl

- Bisto Book of the Year Award for Historical Fiction (1992)

The Blue Horse

- Bisto Book of the Year Award (1993)

Safe Harbour

- Shortlisted - Bisto Book of the Year Award (1995)
