= Siobhán Parkinson =

Irish writer (born 1954)

- Born: November 23, 1954 (age 71); Galway, Ireland
- Education: Trinity College Dublin
- Occupations: Writer, editor, publisher, translator
- Writing career
- Language: English, Irish
- Genres: Children's literature, adult fiction
- Notable awards: Laureate na nÓg (2010–2012)

Siobhán Parkinson (born 23 November 1954) is an Irish writer. She writes for both children and adults and was made Laureate na nÓg in 2010.

== Early life ==
Parkinson grew up in Galway and County Donegal, studied English Literature and German at Trinity College, Dublin, and later completed her PhD on the poetry of Dylan Thomas.

== Writing career ==
She has published more than twenty books since 1992, winning numerous awards, and her books have been translated into multiple languages. She has written in both Irish and English, and also translated from German into English.

As of 2011, she was commissioning editor and publisher with Little Island, an imprint of New Island Books. She is a former co-editor of Bookbird, the magazine of international children's literature organisation IBBY, and former editor of Inis, published by Children's Books Ireland (CBI). She also teaches creative writing at Marino Institute of Education, and has held numerous Writers-in-Schools short-term residencies, with a particular emphasis on working with children with special needs. She has been writer in residence to Dublin City and the Irish Writers' Centre, to Waterford City, and the Church of Ireland College of Education; she is a former board member of CBI and was on the CBI working group to renovate the Bisto Book of the Year awards.

On 10 May 2010, Parkinson was conferred by President of Ireland Mary McAleese as the first ever Laureate na nÓg, a position she would hold until 2012. In her capacity as laureate she expressed the wish that "every child in the country would have access to a [...] library where they could go and find the books that are going to open their minds".

== Works ==
=== Books for children ===
- Four Kids, Three Cats, Two Cows, One Witch (Maybe) – Bisto Merit Award, 1998
- The Moon King – Bisto Merit Award, 1999; Certificate of Honour for Writing, 2000, IBBY
- Sisters ... No Way! – Bisto Book of the Year, 1997
- Breaking the Wishbone (1999)
- The Love Bean (2002)
- Kathleen: The Celtic Knot
- Second Fiddle: How to Tell a Blackbird From a Sausage
- Something Invisible – Bisto Merit Award, 2007
- Amelia (1993)
- No Peace for Amelia
- Animals Don't Have Ghosts (2002)
- Cows Are Vegetarians (2001)
- Blue Like Friday
- The Henny Penny Tree (2010)
- Spellbound (2012)
- Kate (2003)
- The Leprechaun Who Wished He Wasn't (1993)
- Dialann Sár-Rúnda Amy Ní Chonchúir
- Call of the Whales (2000)
- Long Story Short (2011)
- "Bruised" (2011)
- Maitríóisce – Bisto Merit Award, 2012
- Heart-Shaped (2013)
- Alexandra (2014)
- Fionnuala (2014)

=== Other books ===
- All Shining in the Spring: The Story of a Baby Who Died – non-fiction, intended for children and families dealing with the death of a young child (1995)
- The Thirteenth Room (2005) – novel for adults
- Painted Ladies (2010) – novel for adults
- Gráinne - Gaiscíoch Gael (2019) – historical novel about Grace O'Malley. Cois Life. ISBN 978-1-907494-97-0.

=== Translations ===
- The Great Rabbit Revenge Plan by Burkhard Spinnen
- Over the Wall by Renate Ahrens

== Awards and honours ==
Parkinson has been shortlisted eleven times for the Irish Bisto Book of the Year award, which she won on one occasion, for Sisters... No Way!, in 1997. She has received Bisto Merit and Honour Book awards four times and has had two IBBY Honours and several White Ravens. Most recently she won an Oireachtas award for Dialann Sár-Rúnda Amy Ní Chonchúir.

== Publishing career ==
Siobhán Parkinson is the founder of Little Island, an independent publishing house for works for children and young adults. Little Island Books started as a children's imprint of the independent publisher, New Island Books, but later became a separate company. Little Island won the Reading Association of Ireland award in 2011 and the British Book Awards Irish Small Press of the Year in 2019.

== Personal life ==
Parkinson is visually impaired, and uses audiobooks and computers to do her work. She lives in Dublin with her husband, woodturner Roger Bennett.

Cultural offices
Preceded by New post	Laureate na nÓg; 2010–2012	Succeeded by Niamh Sharkey
