= Irish culture in the United States =

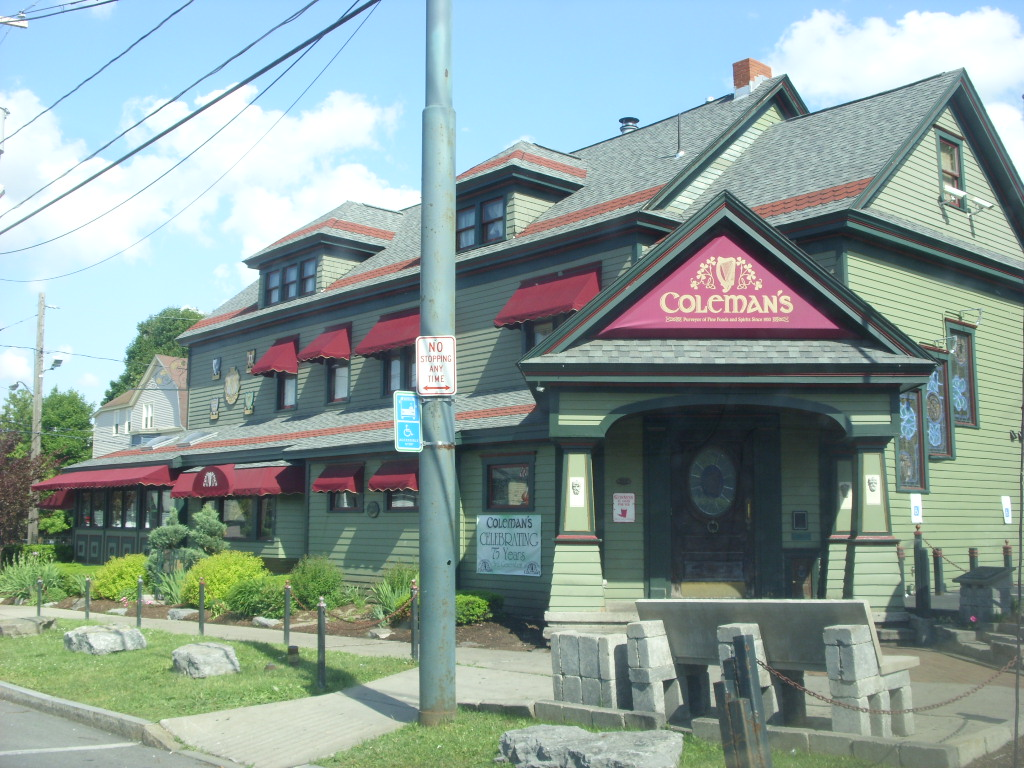
Coleman's Irish pub, Tipperary Hill, New York

Irish culture in America is widespread though not especially visible as such except on Saint Patrick's Day, when, it is said, "Every American is Irish."

Many Irish began to immigrate after World War I. However, there was a decline in immigration after U.S. Congress began to limit the numbers of individuals immigrating. The numbers of Irish immigrants began to increase again after World War II.

Most Irish who came to the United States settled in urban areas. Many of these neighborhoods retain aspects of Irish culture, especially around the local Catholic church.

Words and songs from Ireland have come into common American usage. Common words used in the English language that have Irish origin include galore, hooligan, phony, slob, and whiskey.

Recently, Irish dancing, which has existed in pockets in the U.S., has become popular as a stage performance, with dancers from Ireland touring the United States.

== See also ==
- Irish American
- Scotch-Irish American
