= St. Patrick's Festival =

Festival around St. Patrick's Day in Ireland

- Official name: St. Patrick's Festival
- Observed by: Irish people
- Frequency: Annual

St. Patrick's Festival, established by the Government of Ireland in November 1995, is a tourist attraction, aiming to showcase a modern and creative Ireland, and has since developed into a multi day celebration which takes place annually on and around 17 March, St. Patrick's Day - the national holiday of Ireland.

The principal aim of the Festival was to "develop a major annual international event around the national holiday over which the 'owners' of the festival - the Irish people, would stand proud."

The festival is held in several Irish cities, including Dublin, Cork, Killarney, Waterford, Sligo, Kilkenny and Limerick.

== 2024 ==
In 2024, the festival ran for four days and included pageants, music gigs, walking tours and art exhibitions. This culminated in the St Patrick's Day celebration which saw 500,000 people join the St Patrick’s Day Parade.

The festival was funded by the government's Department of Tourism, Culture, Arts, Gaeltacht, Sport and Media, as well as Fáilte Ireland and Dublin City Council; sponsors included Tayto crisps, Dublin Airport and European Recycling Platform Ireland.
