= Modern literature in Irish =

Modern writings in the Irish language

Although Irish has been used as a literary language for more than 1,500 years (see Irish literature), and modern literature in Irish dates – as in most European languages – to the 16th century, modern Irish literature owes much of its popularity to the 19th century Gaelic Revival, a cultural and language revival movement, and to the efforts of more recent poets and writers. In an act of literary decolonization common to many other peoples seeking self-determination, writers in Irish have taken the advice of Patrick Pearse and have combined influences from both their own literary history and the whole of world literature. Writers in Modern Irish have accordingly produced some of the most interesting literature to come out of Ireland, while being both supplemented and influenced by poetry and prose composed in the Irish language outside Ireland.

== Early revival ==
By the end of the nineteenth century, Irish had been reversed from being the dominant language of Ireland to becoming a minority language, which reduced the literature being produced. The Gaelic Revival sought to reverse this decline. In the beginning, the revivalists preferred to write in Classical Irish, and were notably inspired by Geoffrey Keating's (Seathrún Céitinn) Foras Feasa ar Éirinn (History of Ireland), a much-read 17th-century work. Classical Irish, however, was soon ousted by the living dialects actually being spoken in the Gaeltacht areas, especially as championed by a native speaker from the Coolea-Muskerry area, Father Peadar Ua Laoghaire, who in the 1890s published, in a serialised form, a folkloristic novel strongly influenced by the storytelling tradition of the Gaeltacht, called Séadna. His other works include the autobiography Mo Scéal Féin and retellings of tales from Irish mythology, as well as a recently reissued adaptation of Don Quixote.

Pádraic Ó Conaire was a pioneer in the writing of realistic short stories in Irish; he was also to the forefront of Irish-language journalism. His most important book is his only novel, Deoraíocht (Exile), which combines realism with absurdist elements. He was to die in 1928, not yet fifty years old. Ó Conaire became something of a mythical figure in Irish literary folklore because of his highly individual talent and engaging personality.

== Early twentieth-century writing from the Gaeltacht ==
From the end of the 19th century, researchers were visiting the Gaeltacht to record the lives of native speakers in authentic dialect. This interest from outside stimulated several notable autobiographies, especially on Great Blasket Island, located off the Dingle Peninsula: Peig by Peig Sayers, An t-Oileánach ("The Islandman") by Tomás Ó Criomhthain, and Fiche Bliain ag Fás ("Twenty Years a-Growing") by Muiris Ó Súilleabháin.

Although he greatly admired these Gaeltacht memoirs and particularly that of Tomás Ó Criomhthain, novelist Flann O'Brien also chose to satirize their cliches quite mercilessly in his modernist novel An Béal Bocht ("The Poor Mouth"), which is set in the fictional, desperately poor, and constantly raining Gaeltacht of (Corca Dhorcha); a parody of Irish: Corca Dhuibhne, the name in Munster Irish for the Dingle Peninsula.

Micí Mac Gabhann was the author of Rotha Mór an tSaoil ("The Great Wheel of Life"), dictated in his native Ulster Irish. The title refers to the Klondike gold rush, ruathar an óir, at the end of the 19th century, and the hardship Irish gold-seekers endured on their way to tír an óir, the gold country.

Another important figure was the prolific writer of rural novels, Séamus Ó Grianna (pen name "Máire"). Séamus Ó Grianna's most important contribution to modern literature in the language might be the fact that he persuaded his brother Seosamh (who called himself Seosamh Mac Grianna in Irish) to write in Irish. Seosamh was a less prolific and less fortunate writer than his brother. He was stricken by a severe depressive psychosis in 1935 and spent the rest of his life – more than fifty years – at a psychiatric hospital. Before his psychosis, however, he wrote an impressive novel about the difficult transition to modernity in his own Gaeltacht, called An Druma Mór ("The Big Drum" or "The Fife and Drum Band"), as well as a powerful and introspective account of his travels called Mo Bhealach Féin ("My Own Way"). His last novel, Dá mBíodh Ruball ar an Éan ("If the Bird Had a Tail"), a study of the alienation of a Gaeltacht man in Dublin, was left unfinished, a fact suggested by the title.

Both brothers were acknowledged translators. In addition to translating Walter Scott's Ivanhoe into Irish, Seosamh's work in this field includes the Irish versions of Joseph Conrad's Almayer's Folly, in Irish Díth Céille Almayer, as well as Peadar O'Donnell's Adrigoole, in Irish Eadarbhaile.

== Irish-language modernism ==
Patrick Pearse, who was executed as one of the leaders of the Easter Rising, learnt Connaught Irish in Rosmuc, while continuing to write in Munster Irish. He also wrote idealised stories about the Irish-speaking countryside, as well as nationalistic poetry in a more classical, Keating-esque style.

According to Louis De Paor, Pearse's reading of the experimental free verse poetry of Walt Whitman and of the French Symbolists led him to introduce Modernist poetry into the Irish language. As a literary critic, Pearse also left behind a detailed blueprint for the Decolonization of Irish literature, through drawing not only upon Irish mythology and folklore, but also from the whole of world literature, both past and present. For these reasons, Liam De Paor has called Pearse's execution by a British Army firing squad after the defeat of the 1916 Easter Rising a catastrophic loss for Irish literature which only began to be healed during the late 1940s by the modernist poetry of Seán Ó Ríordáin, Máirtín Ó Direáin, and Máire Mhac an tSaoi.

Ó Direáin, a native Irish speaker and passionate autodidact from Inishmore in the Aran Islands, spent his life as a career civil servant in Galway City and Dublin in the aftermath of the Irish Civil War. He began publishing his work in the early 1940s as a poet of homesickness and urban angst and ended, quite similarly to his literary hero T.S. Eliot, as a harsh cultural critic of escalating Secularization, hedonism, and excessive consumerism.

Máire Mhac an tSaoi, who was also an accomplished Celticist and literary scholar, published several collections of lyric verse beginning in the 1950s. These display her mastery of both the strict metres (Dán Díreach), once taught and widely used before the 17th century closing of the Irish bardic poetry schools, and of the colloquial folk song metres (Amhrán) that replaced them until the early Gaelic revival. In 2013, she also published a literary translation of Rainer Maria Rilke's Duino Elegies from Austrian German into Modern Irish.

Ó Ríordáin was born in the Ballyvourney breac-Gaeltacht: his poetry was experimental enough in metre to draw attacks from literary traditionalists, while also being intensely personal in content. He was also a notable prose writer, as evidenced by his published diaries.

Modernist literature was developed further by Máirtín Ó Cadhain, a schoolmaster from Connemara, who was the Irish-language littérateur engagé par excellence. He was an active service in the IRA, and spent The Emergency years (i.e. the years of Irish neutrality in the Second World War) interned in the Curragh Camp, County Kildare, together with other IRA men and Allied and Axis military personnel. At the camp, he taught Irish language courses to fellow internees and began his modernist masterpiece, the novel Cré na Cille ("Graveyard Clay"). Reminiscent of some Latin American novels (notably Redoble por Rancas by Manuel Scorza, or Pedro Páramo by Juan Rulfo), this novel is a chain of voices of the dead speaking from the churchyard, where they go on forever continuing the now pointless social and political quarrels from when they were alive. Similarly to those of Flann O'Brien, Ó Cadhain's novel lampoons the rose-coloured depiction of life in the Gaeltachtaí favored by the romantic nationalist writers of the early Gaelic revival.

In addition to Cré na Cille, Máirtín Ó Cadhain wrote several collections of short stories (one 'short' story, "Fuíoll Fuine" in the collection An tSraith dhá Tógáil, can count as a novella). An important part of his writings is his journalism, essays, and pamphlets, found in such collections as Ó Cadhain i bhFeasta, Caiscín, and Caithfear Éisteacht.

Máirtín Ó Cadhain's prose is dense, powerful and (especially in his early work) difficult for the novice. His style changed and became simpler with time, in part reflecting the urban world in which he settled. Like the poet Liam Gógan, Ó Cadhain was a linguistic moderniser and wrote in an experimental form of the Irish language, even in contexts where a less obscure style would have been appropriate. He enriched his own Connemara Irish with neologisms and loanwords from other dialects, including Scottish Gaelic.

Modernism and renewal are also represented by several writers not of Gaeltacht background, such as Eoghan Ó Tuairisc, Diarmaid Ó Súilleabháin, and Breandán Ó Doibhlin (the last influenced by French literary theory). Ó Tuairisc, a stylistic innovator, wrote poetry and plays as well as two novels on historical themes: L'Attaque, and Dé Luain. Diarmaid Ó Súilleabháin sought to adapt Irish to the urban world: An Uain Bheo and Caoin Thú Féin offered a depiction of a middle-class environment and its problems. Ó Doibhlin's Néal Maidine agus Tine Oíche is an example of introspective modernism.

== Contemporary literature in Irish ==
Among modern Gaeltacht writers, Pádraig Breathnach, Micheál Ó Conghaile and Pádraig Ó Cíobháin are three of the most important. They adhere in general to the realist tradition, as does Dara Ó Conaola. The work of Joe Steve Ó Neachtain, from the Conamara Gaeltacht, has proved consistently popular.

Caitlín Maude (d. 1982), a native speaker from Conamara, wrote fluent and elegant verse with a distinctively modern sensibility. One of the best known poets is Nuala Ní Dhomhnaill, who was raised in the Munster Gaeltacht and was part of the new wave of the sixties and seventies. She is particularly interested in the mythic element in reality. Biddy Jenkinson (a pseudonym) is representative of an urban tradition: she is a poet and a writer of witty detective stories.

Others of Ní Dhomhnaill's generation were the mordant Michael Hartnett (who wrote both in Irish and English) and Michael Davitt (d.2005), a lyric poet whose work is both whimsical and melancholy. Others of his generation are Liam Ó Muirthile and Gabriel Rosenstock. Among those who followed are Cathal Ó Searcaigh, Tomás Mac Síomóin, Diarmuid Johnson and Louis de Paor. Ó Searcaigh, a lyric poet, is also a traveller: this bore fruit in his engaging travelogue about Nepal, Seal i Neipeal. A younger generation is represented by such poets as Doireann Ní Ghríofa (b.1981).

There is now more emphasis on popular writing in Irish, and among the writers who have had considerable success with lighter genres is Éilís Ní Dhuibhne, novelist, playwright and short story writer. Lorcán S. Ó Treasaigh has written a popular autobiography called Céard é English? (What is English?) about growing up as a native Irish speaker in the predominantly English-speaking city of Dublin. Colm Ó Snodaigh's novella, Pat the Pipe - Píobaire, describes a busker's adventures in Dublin's streets in the nineties.

The short story remains a popular genre. Donncha Ó Céileachair and Síle Ní Chéileachair, brother and sister, published the influential collection Bullaí Mhártain in 1955, dealing with both urban and rural themes. In 1953 Liam O'Flaherty (Liam Ó Flaithearta) published the collection Dúil. O'Flaherty was raised for the first twelve years of his life with Irish on the Aran Islands, but Dúil was his only work in Irish. One of the best known of contemporary practitioners is Seán Mac Mathúna (who also writes in English). His work is characterised by humour and a poetic realism and has been praised for its originality. A writer of a more recent generation is Daithí Ó Muirí. The drive, black humour and absurdist quality of his work distinguish it from the realism of much modern writing in Irish.

== Writers in Irish abroad ==
Countries other than Ireland have produced several contributors to literature in Irish, reflecting the existence globally of a group who have learned or who cultivate the language. It is worthy of note that these writers and their readers do not always form part of the traditional diaspora. It has been argued that the use of the language by non-Irish writers has nothing to do with a specifically Irish identity. Instead, its importance lies in its use value as a language of work, personal relationships and creativity. A number of such writers, both Irish and foreign-born, are to be found in North America, Australia and various European countries.

Dutch-born Alex Hijmans (formerly resident in Ireland and now living in Brazil) has published three books in Irish: an account of his life in Brazil, Favela (2009); a novel, Aiséirí (2011); and a collection of short stories, Gonta (2012).

Panu Petteri Höglund, a linguist, writer and translator, belongs to Finland's Swedish-speaking minority. He uses Irish as a creative medium, and has set himself the goal of producing entertaining and modern writing in an Irish up to Gaeltacht standards. For a long time he experimented with Ulster Irish on the Web, but he published his first book in standard Irish, albeit strongly influenced by native folklore and dialects. He has published several novels, none of them set in Ireland.

Torlach Mac Con Midhe was born in Dublin and now lives in Switzerland. He has published journalism in Irish, German and Romansh. He has published three non-fiction books in Irish: Iarsmaí na Teanga: Na Teangacha Ceilteacha i Stair Smaointeachas na hEorpa (Coiscéim 2005), Muintir Sléibhe agus a Teanga (Coiscéim 2009), Aistí Eorpacha (Coiscéim 2015); and a novel, Crothla agus Cnámha (Coiscéim 2018).

Dublin-born writer Tomás Mac Síomóin, who died in 2022, had been living in Barcelona since 1997. He published over a dozen works in Irish in this period, as well as translations from Spanish and Catalan.

Seán Ó Muirgheasa, an American resident in California, is the author of An Dola a Íoc, a detective novel set in New York City and published by Coiscéim in 2017.

Séamas Ó Neachtain is a fifth-generation Irish American who has published poetry, fiction and journalism in Irish. He is also the founding editor of An Gael, an international literary journal in the Irish language.

Muiris (Mossie) Ó Scanláin, a native speaker of Munster Irish from the Kerry Gaeltacht who lived in Melbourne for many years, is the author of an autobiography, An Mám ó Dheas, published when he resided in Australia and describing his life in Ireland, England and Australia.

Derry-born Pádraig Ó Siadhail (b. 1968) has been living in Halifax, Nova Scotia, since 1987. In this period, he has published ten works in Irish, including a collection of short stories and two novels.

Bantry-born Derry O'Sullivan (1944–2025) lived in Paris since 1969, apart from an interlude in Stockholm. He published four collections of poetry in Irish.

Colin Ryan is an Australian whose short stories, set mostly in Australia and Europe, have appeared in the journals Feasta, Comhar and An Gael. He has also published poetry. Cló Iar-Chonnacht has published two collections of short stories by him: Teachtaireacht (2015) and Ceo Bruithne (2019). Two collections of his poetry have been published by Coiscéim: Corraí na Nathrach (2017) and Rogha (2022)

Julie Breathnach-Banwait is an Australian citizen of Irish origin living in Western Australia. She is the author of: Dánta Póca (2020) Ar Thóir gach Ní (2022) and Cnámha Scoilte (2023). She has had many publications in various literary magazines and anthologies both in Ireland and Australia.

== Literary magazines ==
The oldest Irish-language literary magazines responsible for the encouragement of poetry and short fiction are Comhar (founded in 1942) and Feasta (founded in 1948). The latter, presently edited by Cormac Ó hAodha, is the journal of the Gaelic League, though it has an independent editorial policy. Both magazines publish short fiction and poetry: the manifesto of Feasta also declares that one of its objects is to encourage students to write in Irish. Feasta has enjoyed more stability than Comhar, which suffered from a declining readership and has now been reconstituted. The withdrawal of support by Foras na Gaeilge, a major source of subsidies, may affect their future. Both magazines have had as contributors some of the most notable figures in modern Irish-language literature, and continue to encourage new writing.

They have since been joined by An Gael, an international literary magazine established in North America but publishing prose and poetry in Irish by writers from a number of different countries, including Ireland, Australia and Finland.

Oghma was a literary journal in the Irish language published from 1989 to 1998.

== Irish-language writing in local context ==
There are presently over 2,500 works of various kinds in print in Irish, of which the largest proportion is literature (over 2,000, including novels, short stories and poetry), children's books and educational material.

It has been remarked that the average print run for a book of poetry or prose is probably 500, though a popular work of detective fiction might have a print run of 2,000.

Among the genres least cultivated in Irish is science fiction (a fact possible related to the dearth of popular science writing in the language, despite a wealth of available terminology). The American-based magazine An Gael has, however, published serials with elements of fantasy and the surreal.

== Irish-language publishers ==
A number of publishers specialise in Irish-language material. They include the following.

- An tÁisaonad, books for children mainly.
- Breacadh, established in 2000, they produce learning material for adult learners, and are placed in the Connemara Gaeltacht.
- Cló Chaisil, publishes books in Irish only. It produces books for children, teenagers and adults.
- Cló Iar-Chonnacht, founded in 1985, has as its particular aim the publishing of work by Gaeltacht writers. It has published over 300 books, predominantly in Irish, together with music. It has acquired the titles from Sáirséal agus Dill and Cois Life.
- Cló Ollscoil Chorcaí,
- Comhairle Bhéaloideas Éireann,
- Coiscéim, founded in 1980, has published 1500 titles, making it the largest private Irish language publisher in Ireland.
- Cois Life, established in 1995 stopped publishing in 2019, published literary and academic works. Its output includes plays, fiction and poetry. Now closed, All its titles will be taken on by Cló iar-Chonachta
- Cló Mhaigh Eo, Well-illustrated books in Irish for children and young people.
- Éabhlóid, were established in 2010 and have been publishing books for children and adults since.
- FÁS,(Foilseacháin Ábhair Spioradálta), established on 1 February 1916 at a meeting of Aontas Mhánuat ("Maynooth Union") and they called themselves Cumann na Sagart nGaedhalach, dropping the 'nGaedhlach' some time later.
- Cumann na Scríbheann nGaedhilge, Established in 1898, The Irish Texts Society has been publishing well edited and translated editions of important works from the canon of Irish language literature. They also
- ForSai, company solely publishing works by Gary Bannister.
- Futa Fata, Music label and publishing house producing books and CDs in Irish for children and young people.
- An Gúm, has been publishing books in Irish since 1926 under the aegis of the Irish State. It is the largest Irish language publisher in the country, and now mainly publishes lexicography, textbooks and other curricular resources, together with material for children and young adults.
- Leabhar Breac, A publisher of quality literature in Irish, also publishes graphic novels and translates titles like Tin Tin and Asterix and Oblix.
- Leabhar Comhair, Leabhair Chomhar is the book publishing imprint of the literary magazine Comhar, publishing books for adult learners of Irish as well as a number of general prose and poetry titles.
- Móinín, Literature in Irish and English for children, young people and adults.
- Muintearas, Established in 2012, they provide learning material for early years learning.
- Oidhreacht Chorca Dhuibhne, Specialists in publishing books and CDs of special interest in the Kerry gaeltacht.
- Polca Phunc, following on from Éabhlóid's publication of Ící Pící by Doimnic Mac Giolla Bhríde, the same author established his own publishing company to publish his next illustrated book of new songs i nGaeilge Thír Chonail.
- Púca Press, is a small publisher producing limited edition hand printed books in Irish and other languages.
- An tSnáthaid Mhór, founded in 2005, aims to publish high-quality contemporary books with elaborate illustrations for children of all ages.
- An Timire, is a publisher of religious books in Irish and the religious magazine An Timire, they seem to be a better branded branch of FÁS.
- Údar, is the publishing wing of Glór na nGael, they produce children's books, board games, cards etc.

== English Language Publishers who also publish in Irish ==
A number of English language publishers provide some Irish-language material too. They include the following.

- Acadamh Ríoga na hÉireann, the RIA has supported the Irish language with a number of publications Section C of the Proceedings of the Royal Irish Academy is dedicated to 'Archaeology, history, Celtic studies, linguistics and literature'.
- Arlen House, established in 2011(?), specialising in books of literary and cultural importance mostly in English and some in Irish.
- Institiúid Ard-léinn na hÉireann, DIAS have a publishing programme for academic publications on Celtic matters, some of which are in Irish.
- Everytype, publishers of books in many languages
- Irish Pages, founded in 2002, is a bilingual English and Irish journal. Its September 2010 issue was dedicated to writing in Irish.
- O'Brien Press,
- Mercier Press,
- Veritas, Religious publications, mainly in English, with some titles in Irish, they publish the Fadó series of bilingual books.

== Irish-language publishers who have ceased publishing ==
- An Clóchomhar. They produced a large number of books of both general and academic interest, frequently placing Irish concerns in a broader perspective.
- An Preas Náisiúnta.
- An Sagart. Established in 1964, Mostly academic and religious books but also some poetry and prose. (No longer active since the passing of its sole director an tAth. Pádraig Ó Fianachta).
- Brún agus Ó Nualláin.
- Cló Morainn.
- Clódhanna Teoranta, Conradh na Gaeilge's publishing house.
- Cló Thalbóid.
- Comhartha na dTtrí gCoinneall.
- Comhlucht an Oideachais.
- FNT.
- ITÉ. Formerly Institiúid Teangeolaíochta Éireann / Linguistics Institute of Ireland, it published academic books on linguistic matters regarding the Irish language in contemporary Ireland. The institute no longer exists.
- Mac an Ghoill.
- Preas Dhún Dealgan.
- Sáirséal agus Dill. Established in 1945. Later called Sáirséal Ó Marcaigh, they ceased publishing in 2009. Their aim was to develop Irish language literature and to assist Irish language writers. They published 200 books. All the titles were acquired by Cló Iar-Chonnacht.

== See also ==
- Irish short stories
- Status of the Irish language

== Literature ==
- J. E. Caerwyn Williams agus Máirín Uí Mhuiríosa. Traidisiún Liteartha na nGael. An Clóchomhar Tta, 1979.
