= Feasta =

Irish-language magazine

- Editor: Cormac Ó hAodha
- Former editors: Pádraig Mac Fhearghusa
- Categories: Irish literature
- Frequency: Monthly
- First issue: 1948
- Final issue: 2023
- Country: Ireland
- Based in: Cúil Aodha
- Language: Irish language

Feasta was an Irish-language magazine that was established in 1948. Its purpose is the furtherance of the aims of Conradh na Gaeilge (Gaelic League), an objective reflecting the cultural nationalism of the language movement, and the promotion of new writing. Feasta described itself as a review of Irish thought, literature, politics, and science (Reiviú den Smaointeachas Éireannach - litríocht, polaitíocht, eolaíocht). It was formerly supported by Foras na Gaeilge, but this support was withdrawn because of a review of funding priorities. The magazine then relied on its own resources.. Feasta ceased publication in May 2023.

== History ==
Feasta's foundation in the 1940s reflected the progress made in Irish-language journalism and writing generally since the Gaelic Revival. Together with other journals such as An tUltach and Comhar, it was an agent in adapting the language to the requirements of the modern world, and helped determine the course of Irish-language writing.

The magazine has had many editors, the longest serving being the poet and educationalist Pádraig Mac Fhearghusa. Previous editors also included Seosamh Ó Duibhginn (later Irish-language editor of The Irish Press), Eoghan Ó Tuairisc, Séamas Ruiséal, Aogán Ó Muircheartaigh and Íte Ní Chionnaith, who was also the first woman elected as president of Conradh na Gaeilge. The final editor was Cormac Ó hAodha.

Despite its links with Conradh na Gaeilge, Feasta functioned as an independent magazine and noted that the views expressed therein are not necessarily those of the Conradh itself.

== Scope ==
Feasta published literary criticism, reviews, and social and political commentary, with some regular columnists. Social and cultural events relating to the Irish language were also covered. Poetry was published regularly and contributors included Máirtín Ó Direáin, Máire Mhac an tSaoi, Seán Ó Ríordáin, and Nuala Ní Dhomhnaill. The magazine also published short fiction, with particular emphasis on new writing. Despite its general emphasis on the linguistic and cultural situation in Ireland, Feasta published Irish-language material from overseas when available. The magazine also carried advertising by Irish-language publishers.

== See also ==
- Modern literature in Irish
