= Innti =

Irish language poetry movement

- Editor: Michael Davitt
- Categories: Irish poetry
- Frequency: Sporadic
- First issue: 1970
- Country: Ireland
- Based in: County Cork
- Language: Irish language

Innti was a literary movement of poets writing Modern literature in Irish, associated with a literary journal of the same name founded in 1970 by Michael Davitt, Nuala Ní Dhomhnaill, Gabriel Rosenstock, Liam Ó Muirthile, later joined by Louis de Paor. These writers were students of University College Cork, drawing inspiration from Seán Ó Ríordáin and Seán Ó Riada, as well as American influences such as the Beat movement and the counterculture of the 1960s. Their reception was mixed, with literary traditionalists resenting their urbanism, social liberalism and "foreign" Anglo-American influences.

== Background ==
Some prominent Gaelic poets in the generation prior to Innti were associated with the journal Comhar. Among these, who were of relevance to Innti were Seán Ó Ríordáin and the author of Nuabhéarsaíocht, Seán Ó Tuama. These writers were both from the County Cork area and Ó Ríordáin especially introduced European-styles into Irish-language poetry and themes of modern urban life. Ó Tuama held seminars on Irish poetry at University College Cork where Innti was founded in 1970.

Aside from these local Irish influences, Innti was also influenced by the American-led counterculture of the 1960s which spread throughout the Western world. Among these foreign influences (principally from American poetry) were Beat poets such as Allen Ginsberg and Jack Kerouac. Innti marked a counterpoint to the traditional Irish nationalist idealization of the Gaeltacht as a somewhat austere, rural Catholic bastion of a Pre-Colonial Ireland, counter-posed to "English decadence" in the cities. The Sexual Revolution, questioning of authority, a more cosmopolitan writing of Gaelicness and the arrival of pop music were innovations in Gaelic from Innti.

The eclecticism of Innti, drawing from non-Gaelic sources, also allowed for Oriental-influences, such as the Tibetan Book of the Dead and Japanese haiku poetry, to feature alongside Anglophone and French modernist ones such as E. E. Cummings, T. S. Eliot, Wallace Stevens and Charles Baudelaire. This post-Christian environment even led to some, such as Rosenstock, exploring deeper Indo-European connections between Buddhism and pre-Christian Irish mythology and Gaelic culture.

== See also ==
- Modern literature in Irish
- Cúil Aodha and Corca Dhuibhne
