= Comhar =

Irish-language literary journal

- Editor: Seán Tadhg Ó Gairbhí
- Categories: Irish literature
- Frequency: Monthly
- Publisher: Comhar Teoranta
- Founder: An Comhchaidreamh
- First issue: 1942
- Country: Ireland
- Based in: Dublin
- Language: Irish language
- Website: comhar.ie

Comhar (Irish pronunciation: [koːɾˠ]; "partnership") is a prominent literary journal in the Irish language, published by the company Comhar Teoranta. It was founded in 1942, and has published work by some of the most notable writers in Irish, including Máirtín Ó Cadhain, Seán Ó Ríordáin, Máirtín Ó Direáin, Máire Mhac an tSaoi and Brendan Behan. Comhar also publishes books in Irish (around three a year).

Comhar's primary goal is to be a journal of first choice for writers, scholars, critics and readers of Irish, to publish the best of new writing in Irish, to be a high-quality forum for analysis and discussion of current affairs, to provide intellectual stimulation and be a platform for debate.

Comhar has had a number of editors, including the well-known journalist and novelist Breandán Ó hEithir. It was clear by the beginning of 2008, however, that its readership was declining steeply, and the funding body Foras na Gaeilge decided to give no more money to the journal as it stood. This led to the reconstitution of the board and the appointment of a new editor.

Selections from Comhar are now available on-line. It continues to fulfil its traditional function of publishing new writing and providing cultural and social commentary.

== Editors ==
=== 1942 ===
Seán Ó Buachalla, Máirtín Ó Flathartaigh, Tomás Ó Floinn, Tomás de Bhaldraithe, Séamus Ó Néill, Dáithí Ó hUaithne, Seán Mac Réamoinn, Proinsias Mac Cana, Caoimhín Ó Góilidhe, Helen Beaumont, Mícheál Ó Cíosóig

=== 1952 ===
Riobard Mac Góráin, Gearóid Mac Niocaill, Mícheál Ó Riain, Eibhlín Ní Bhriain, Breandán Ó hEithir

=== 1962 ===
Breandán Ó hEithir (1960-1963; 1965–1966), Caoimhín Ó Marcaigh, Eoghan Ó hAnluain, Mícheál Ó hUanacháin, Piaras Ó Gaora

=== 1972 ===
Seán Ó hÉalaithe, Dáithí Ó hÓgáin, Cathal Mac Giolla Coille, Treasa Ní Ógáin, Rhoda Uí Chonaire, Proinnseas Ní Dhorcaí, Anna Heussaff

=== 1982 ===
Caoilfhionn Nic Pháidín, Mícheál Ó Cearúil, Seosamh Ó Murchú, Éamonn Ó Dónaill

=== 1992 ===
Editor: Tomás Mac Síomóin

Sub-editor: Vivian Uíbh Eachach

Literary Editor: Siobhán Ní Fhoghlú (January–July); Gréagóir Ó Dúill (August–December)

=== 1993/1994 ===
Editor: Tomás Mac Síomóin

Sub-editor: Vivian Uíbh Eachach

Literary Editor: Gréagóir Ó Dúill

=== 1995 ===
Editor: Tomás Mac Síomóin (January–September); Vivian Uíbh Eachach (February–December)

Sub-editor: Vivian Uíbh Eachach (January)

Literary Editor: Gréagóir Ó Dúill (January–September); Liam Prút (October–December)

=== 1996/1997 ===
Editor: Vivian Uíbh Eachach

Literary Editor: Liam Prút

=== 1998 ===
Editor: Pól Ó Muirí (January–July, September–November); Antain Mac Lochlainn (guest editor, August); (editor, December)

Literary Editor: Antain Mac Lochlainn (November)

=== 1999 ===
Editor: Antain Mac Lochlainn

=== 2000 ===
Editor: Antain Mac Lochlainn (January–March); Vivian Uíbh Eachach (April); Alex Hijmans (May–December)

=== 2001 ===
Editor: Alex Hijmans (January–June); Úna Ní Chonchúir (July/August–December)

=== 2002 ===
Editor: Úna Ní Chonchúir (January–September); Mícheál Ó hUanacháin (October–December)

=== 2003-2007 ===
Editor: Mícheál Ó hUanacháin

=== 2008 ===
The magazine was not published: January–September, 2008

Editor: Aindrias Ó Cathasaigh (October–November); Pól Ó Muirí (Christmas)

=== 2009-2010 ===
Editor: Pól Ó Muirí; Ríona Nic Congáil (guest editor, September)

=== 2011 ===
Editor: Ian Ó Caoimh

Literary Editor: Aifric Mac Aodha

=== 2012 ===
Editor: Ian Ó Caoimh (January–March); Aifric Mac Aodha (April-present)

Literary Editor: Aifric Mac Aodha (January–March)

Assistant Editor: Seán Tadhg Ó Gairbhí (April-present)

=== Table of Editors ===
Editor	Edition(s)
Breandán Ó hEithir	?1960 - ?1963: ?1965 - September 1966
Piaras Ó Gaora	?1964
Caoimhín Ó Marcaigh	October 1966 - August 1968
Eoghan Ó hAnluain	October 1966 - April 1970
Mícheál Ó hUanacháin	May 1970 - December 1971
Dáithí Ó hÓgain, Cathal Mac Giolla Coille, Treasa Ní Ógáin	January 1972 - December 1973
Seán Ó hÉalaithe	January 1974 - December 1975
Rhoda Uí Chonaire	January 1976 - December 1976
Proinnseas Ní Dhorcaí	January 1976 - March 1979
Anna Heussaff	April 1979
Caoilfhionn Nic Pháidín	April 1979 - September 1983
Mícheál Ó Cearúil	October 1983 - December 1984
Seosamh Ó Murchú	January 1985 - April 1987
Éamonn Ó Dónaill	May 1987 - April 1988
Tomás Mac Siomóin	May 1988 - September 1995
Vivian Uíbh Eachach	February 1995 - December 1997: April 2000
Pól Ó Muirí	January 1998 - July 1998: September 1998 - November 1998; December 2008 - August 2010; October 2010 - December 2010
Antain Mac Lochlainn	August 1998: December 1998 - March 2000
Alex Hijmans	May 2000 - June 2001
Úna Ní Conchúir	July 2001 - September 2002
Mícheál Ó hUanacháin	October 2002 - December 2007
Aindrias Ó Cathasaigh	October 2008 - November 2008
Ríona Nic Chongáil	September 2010
Ian Ó Caoimh	January 2011 - March 2012
Aifric Mac Aodha	April 2012 - April 2013
Seán Tadhg Ó Gairbhí	May 2013 - current

== LeabhairCOMHAR ==
LeabhairCOMHAR was re-established in 2010 in an effort to further develop Irish-language literature. This publishing company aims to recruit and nurture new writers. To date, LeabhairCOMHAR has published more than 45 books. Its range includes history books, academic biographies and novels for adults, with the following six series in development:

- Guth Nua (fiction for adults written by new writers);
- Doras Feasa (historical and informative books);
- An Saol Óg (picture books and children's literature);
- Saol agus Saothar (academic biographies);
- Téad na Filíochta (thematic collections of poetry from recognised poets) and
- Foghlaimeoir Fásta (novels for adults who are learning Irish).

Books published by LeabhairCOMHAR can be found on its online bookshop: www.iriscomhar.com.

=== Foghlaimeoir Fásta ===
- Gaeilgeoir Grámhar by Alan Desmond, 2011.
- Samhradh an Chéasta by Catherine Foley, 2010.
- An Foghlaimeoir Fásta by Alan Desmond, 2006.
- Croí na Ceiste by Pól Ó Muirí, 2007 (out of print).
- Gaeilge agus Grá by Alan Desmond, 2007 (out of print).
- Míle Murdar! by Mícheál Ó Ruairc, 2005..
- Paloma by Pól Ó Muirí, 2000 (2002) (out of print).
- Sorcha sa Ghailearaí by Catherine Foley, 2005 (out of print).
- Teach na gColúr by Aisling Ní Leidhin and Liam Mac Amhlaigh, 2006 (2010).
- Teifeach by Pól Ó Muirí, 2002 (2005).

=== Books published between 2010 and 2012 ===
- Codladh Céad Bliain: Cnuasach Aistí ar Litríocht na nÓg by Ríona Nic Congáil, from the series An Saol Óg, 2012.
- An Ghaeilge i gCéin: Pobal agus Féiniúlacht Idirnáisiúnta, edited by Siún Ní Dhuinn, from the series Guth Nua, 2011.
- Annála by Gréagóir Ó Dúill, from the series Téad na Filíochta, 2011.
- Saol an Mhadra Bháin by Ríona Nic Congáil, from the series An Saol Óg, 2011.
- Rún an Bhonnáin by Proinsias Mac a’ Bhaird, from the series Guth Nua, 2010.
- Uachtaráin na hÉireann by Eithne Nic Eoin, 2010.

=== Books published before 2010 ===
- An bhfaca tú Dracula? Dialann Thrasalvánach by Aodh Ó Canainn, 1997 (out of print).
- An Cailín Rua by Catherine Foley, 2004 (out of print).
- An Chaint sa tSráidbhaile, articles and short stories by Breandán Ó hEithir, edited by Caoilfhionn Nic Pháidín, 1991 (out of print).
- An Dá Mháirtín by Diarmaid Ó Gráinne, 1990.
- An Deoir sa Bhuidéal by S.E. Ó Cearbhaill, 1998.
- An Ród seo Romham by Liam Mac Uistín, 2006.
- An Spealadóir Polannach by Peter Huchel, translated from the German, 1994.
- An Stad – Croí na hAthbheochana by Seán Ó Cearnaigh, 1993.
- Ar Bhruach na Laoi by Liam Ó Muirthile, 1995 (out of print).
- Bás i mBaile an Ghorta by Mícheál Ó Ruairc, 2003 (out of print).
- Bás san Oirthear by Lorcán S. Ó Treasaigh, 1992.
- Brocairí Bhedlington agus Scéalta Eile by Gearailt Mac Eoin, 1996.
- Caithfear Éisteacht!, collected articles of Máirtín Ó Cadhain, edited by Liam Prút, 1999.
- Cion Fir: Aistí Thomáis Uí Fhloinn, edited by Liam Prút, 1997.
- Clann na nÉan / Ríocht na Cailce by Gabriel Rosenstock, 2005 (out of print).
- Comhar: Innéacs 50 bliain by Máire de Grás, 1992 (out of print).
- Dlíthe an Nádúir by Pól Ó Muirí, 2001 (out of print).
- Géaga Trí Thine by Gabriel Rosenstock, 2006 (out of print).
- Máire de Buitléir: Bean Athbheochana by Mairéad Ní Chinnéide, 1993.
- Ó Chómhargadh go hAontas by Maolmhaodhóg Ó Ruairc, 1994.
- Oileán Rúin agus Muir an Dáin by Micheál Mac Craith, 1993.
- Plumaí by Liam Prút, 1997.
- Pónairí ar Thósta: Dialann Mic Léinn Ollscoile by Mícheál Ó Ruairc, 2007.
- Ríomh-Scéalta Chuig Bilí by Liam Mac Uistín, 2007 (2010).
- Scríbhneoirí na Gaeilge 1945-1995 by Seán Ó Cearnaigh, 1995.
- Seal sa Pholainn by Alan Desmond, 2007.
- Seán agus a Chamán by Pádraig ó Giollagáin and Mike McCarty, 2001 (out of print).
- Seo Linn go Tóiceo by Iarla Mac Aodha Bhuí, 2000.
- Tréigean na Cúise by Iarla Mac Aodha Bhuí, 1999.
- Trasna na dTonnta by Mícheál Ó Ruairc, 2001 (out of print).
- Trioblóid (book and CD) by Colmán Ó Drisceoil, 2005 (out of print).
- Turas in Éadan na Gaoithe, poems by Peter Härtling, translated from German into Irish by Máire Mhic Eoin, 2002 (out of print).

== See also ==
- List of Irish-language media
- Modern Literature in Irish
- Feasta
