= Pádraigín Haicéad =

Irish historical figure

Pádraigín Haicéad (English Patrick Hackett; Latin Patricius Hacquettus; c. 1604 – November 1654) was an Irish-language poet and Dominican priest.

His father was James Hackett FitzPiers, from a Norman Irish family at Ballytarsna near Cashel, County Tipperary. From his Gaelic Irish mother Mairéad Ní Chearna (Margaret Kearney) of Littleton he seems to have gained knowledge of Gaelic legends and folklore.

Around the year 1625, Haicéad joined the Dominicans in Limerick, and, in 1628, went to the Irish College, Louvain, returning to Ireland in 1638 as prior of St. Dominic's Abbey, Cashel. The Butlers of Dunboyne were related to his mother and patrons of his; the 1640 death of Edmond [Eamonn] Butler, Baron Dunboyne was a turning point in his personal and poetic life. He wrote a caoineadh (lament) for Eamonn whose metre became usual in caointe of the subsequent decades. He supported the 1641 Rebellion and in the ensuing Catholic Confederation he was a preacher in the Munster army. In 1647, Haicéad and other preachers' opposition to Donough MacCarthy, Viscount Muskerry's leadership helped cause the disintegration of the Confederate army. He was ordered back to Louvain in 1651 and died there.

Editions of Haicéad's poems were published in 1916 and 1962. English translations have been published by Michael Hartnett for most poems, and in lesser numbers by Seán Ó Tuama, Thomas Kinsella, and Pearse Hutchinson. Before entering the Dominicans, Haicéad wrote two love poems to Máire Tóibín, of which "Dála an Nóinín" is apparently translated from an English-language poem by either Thomas Watson or Charles Best. As well as poetry in the dán díreach form, he wrote quatrains and an epithalamium to Edward Bunting's air "Kathleen Nowlan". His writings use suairceas, "agreeableness" as a term of art for well-written poetry.

== Features of Haicéad's Poetry ==
The poetry of Haicéad has been used as evidence that – already by the early 1600s, and at least in the Cashel area of County Tipperary – word-stress was (regularly?) placed on a word's second syllable if it contained a long vowel, as found in modern Munster Irish. This is seen in the final words of the following lines:

"A Chríost, is buan 's is truagh mo ghéar-ghearán" ([ʝɪˈɾˠɑːn̪ˠ])
"O Christ, eternal and a pity is my bitter complaint"

"re dlaoi chais bhród-ómraigh a dual-chocán" ([xʊˈkɑːn̪ˠ]), (Poem 51, line 20)
"with a proud amber-coloured curled lock of her tress-hairbun"
