= Seán Ó Tuama =

Irish poet, playwright and academic (1926–2006)

- Born: 28 January 1926; Cork, Ireland
- Died: 14 October 2006 (age 80)
- Occupations: poet; playwright; academic
- Years active: 1950–1997

Seán Ó Tuama (1926 – 14 October 2006) was an Irish poet, playwright and academic.

== Life ==
Ó Tuama was born in the southern city of Cork and raised in the neighboring community of Gurranebraher, where he was the third of nine children born to parents Aodh Ó Tuama and Eibhlín Ní Éigearta. Both of his parents were Irish language teachers affiliated with Conradh na Gaeilge (the Gaelic League), with Micheál Mac Liammóir being among their most prominent students. Ó Tuama's mother, Eibhlín Ní Éigearta, was an active member of Cumann na mBan and participated in the Easter Rising of 1916 in Enniscorthy, County Wexford.

He was educated at the North Monastery (North Mon) school and University College Cork, where Daniel Corkery taught him English and Irish literature. Corkery had a significant influence on Ó Tuama, who described him as "the best teacher" he ever had. After his graduation, Ó Tuama first came to prominence in 1950 with his anthology of modern Irish language poetry titled Nuabhéarsaíocht. The anthology highlighted the work of poets writing in the Irish language, including Seán Ó Riordáin, Máirtín Ó Direáin, Máire Mhac an tSaoi, Liam Gógan, and Séamas Ó hAodha.

Notable academic works include An Grá in Amhráin na nDaoine, an analysis of medieval and Renaissance European influences on Irish song, which is credited as being a source of inspiration for poets including Liam Ó Muirthile and Gabriel Rosenstock. The anthology An Duanaire: Poems of the Dispossessed, a collection of poems in the Irish language dating from the 16th to 19th centuries selected by Ó Tuama and accompanied by translations of the poems into English by Thomas Kinsella, was published in 1981. Ó Tuama's interests ranged beyond poetry and academic study. Between 1955 and 1956, he traveled to France to study drama. He founded Compántas Chorcaí, an Irish language drama group, upon his return to Ireland.

Ó Tuama was the Professor of Irish Literature at University College Cork, and visiting professor at Harvard, Oxford and Toronto University. He was awarded an Honorary Doctorate by the National University of Ireland in 1995 for his academic contributions to the field of Irish literature. He was also chairman of Bord na Gaeilge for a time, and a member of the Arts Council of Ireland.

When Ó Tuama died in Cork on September 14, 2006, he was survived by his wife Beití (née Dinan) and their sons Finín, Barra, Aodh Óg, Eoin and Ciarán.

== Awards ==
- 1983 American Book Award

== Works ==
=== Poetry ===
- Faoileán Na Beatha (Baile Átha Cliath, An Chlochomar Tta., 1962)
- Rogha dánta: Death in the Land of Youth: New and Selected Poems of Sean O Tuama. Translated by Peter Denman. Cork University Press. 1997. ISBN 978-1-85918-157-7.

=== Plays ===
- Gunna Cam agus Slabhra Oir. Drama Vearsaíochta Thrí Ghníomh (Baile Átha Cliath, Sairseal Agus Dill). Folens and Co. Ltd. 1973. ISBN 978-0-902592-52-0.
- Ar aghaidh linn, a Longadáin
- Moloney
- Is é seo m'oileán
- Corp Eoghain Uí Shúilleabháin
- Déan trócaire ar shagairt óga
- Iúdás Iscariot agus a bhean
- Scéal ar Phádraig

=== Academic works ===
- An Grá in Amhráin na nDaoine (An Clochomhar Tta., 1960)
- An Grá i bhFilíocht na nUaisle (1988)

=== Anthologies ===
- Seán Ó Tuama, ed. (1981). An Duanaire: Poems of the Dispossessed. Translated by Thomas Kinsella. Dublin: Dolmen Press. ISBN 978-0-85105-363-9.
- Coiscéim na hAoise Seo, an anthology of 20th-century poetry in Irish

=== Essays ===
- Cúirt, Tuath agus Bruachbhaile, An Clóchomhar Tta, 1990
- Nuabhéarsaíocht 1939-1949 (as editor, Baile Atha Cliath, Sairseal agus Dill, 1950)
- The Facts About Irish. Coraigh: An Comhar Poiblí. 1964.
- The Gaelic League Idea. Cork: Mercier Press. 1972. ISBN 978-0-85342-245-7.
- Repossessions, selected essays on the Irish literary heritage. Cork University Press. 1995. ISBN 978-1-85918-044-0.
