= Pádraig Mac Fhearghusa =

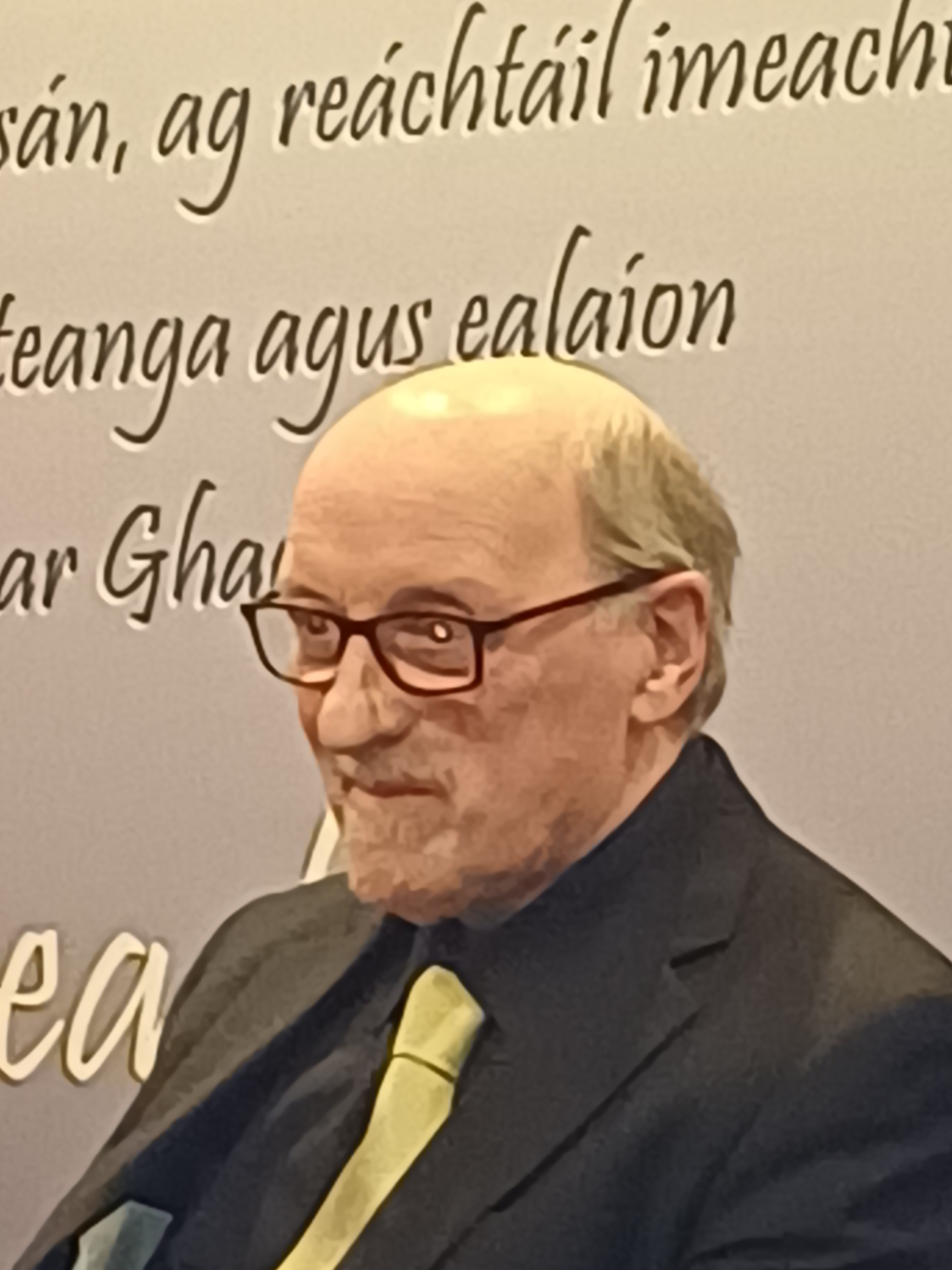

Pádraig Mac Fhearghusa is an Irish language poet, magazine editor and language activist.

He was born in Ballineen in County Cork in 1947. He graduated from University College Dublin in 1970 with a BA in Irish, history and philosophy and obtained a Higher Diploma in Education from Trinity College, Dublin, in 1971. He has worked both as a primary and secondary teacher, and in 1978 helped found a Gaelscoil, Scoil Lán-Ghaeilge Mhic Easmainn, in Tralee. He has been active in the promotion of Irish and in 2008 was elected as President of the Gaelic League. He held this post until 2011, when Donnchadh Ó hAodha was elected.

He has won recognition as a poet. His collection Mearcair won the Oireachtas na Gaeilge National Poetry Prize in 1996, and another collection, An Dara Bás, won the same prize in 2002. He has contributed two poems to the Irish Poetry Reading Archive: 'An Teaghlach Naofa agus Naomh Eoin i dTírdhreach' and 'Eibhlinn'.

He was for decades the editor of the Irish language literary monthly Feasta.

== Published work ==
- Faoi Léigear (An Clóchomhar Tta.,1980)
- Mearcair (Coiscéim 1996)
- An Dara Bás (Coiscéim, 2002)
- Tóraíocht an Mhíshonais (The Pursuit of Unhappiness), an introduction to Sigmund Freud and Carl Jung (Coiscéim, 1997)
