= Louis de Paor =

Irish poet

Louis de Paor (born 1961) is a well-known poet in the Irish language. Born in Cork in 1961 and educated at Coláiste an Spioraid Naoimh, de Paor edited the Irish-language journal Innti, founded in 1970 by Michael Davitt, Nuala Ní Dhomhnaill, Liam Ó Muirthile and Gabriel Rosenstock. He was awarded a PhD in Modern Irish from the National University of Ireland in 1986 for his thesis on Máirtín Ó Cadhain.

He and his family emigrated to Australia in 1987 and lived in Melbourne, where he wrote, gave poetry readings and broadcast in Irish on the Special Broadcasting Service (a network set up for ethnic and linguistic minorities). He was given scholarships by the Australia Council in 1990, 1991 and 1995.

He returned to Ireland in 1996, and is now the Director of the Centre for Irish Studies at NUI Galway.

De Paor has worked alongside several other Irish language writers, such as Seán Ó Tuama, with whom he edited a twentieth century anthology of poetry in Irish. He has also published academic works.

== Poetry ==
De Paor has had considerable success in the Oireachtas literary competitions: his first collection, Próca solais is luatha (BÁC: Coiscéim, 1988), won Duais an Ríordánaigh, a prize which he has won several times since. Among his other collections are 30 dán (BÁC: Coiscéim, 1992), Corcach agus dánta eile (BÁC: Coiscéim, 1999) and Agus rud eile de (BÁC: Coiscéim, 2002).

Two collections emerged from his Australian sojourn: Aimsir bhreicneach / Freckled weather (Canberra: Leros Press, 1993) and Ríleanna báistí (Indreabhán: Cló Iar-Chonnachta, 1992). His most recent collection is Agus Rud Eile De/ And Another Thing, published by Cló Iar-Chonnachta (2010).

His style, characterised originally by lightness, clarity and directness, has become darker and more complex, though he remains to some extent a "public" poet. Much of his work has been published bilingually.

== Artistic collaborations ==
De Paor has collaborated with such traditional musicians as the piper Ronan Browne, and the Irish-Egyptian sean-nós singer Naisrín Elsafty.
