= Diarmaid Ó Súilleabháin (writer) =

Diarmaid Ó Súilleabháin (1932 – 1985) was an Irish language writer whose chosen theme was contemporary urban life. He is acknowledged as an important Irish language modernist. He was also active in the Irish republican movement and a member of Sinn Féin.

== Personal life ==
Ó Súilleabháin was born at the Beara Peninsula in County Cork. His mother was a primary school teacher and his father a small farmer. He married Úna Ní Chléirigh in 1954, and they had two sons and three daughters. He died on 5 June 1985.

== Career ==
He settled in Gorey and worked there as a primary teacher for the Christian Brothers school.

He is best known now for his literary work. He wrote ten novels, two of them for teenagers. Maeldún was a pioneering Irish novel that explored sexuality. He wrote seven unpublished plays. Three plays that he wrote include Bior, Ontos, and Macalla and he wrote a collection of short stories, Muintir. A story from Muintir called 'D' was translated into English and adapted for the stage by Vivian C. McAlister and was performed by Dublin University Players in May 1977.

Like Eoghan Ó Tuairisc, he "challenged the critical orthodoxy by openly proclaiming that their standards could not be those of the Gaeltacht and by demanding a creative freedom that would acknowledge hybridity and reject the strictures of the linguistic purists." He and Máirtín Ó Cadhain were considered the two most innovative Irish language authors to emerge in the 1960s. He often wrote in a stream of consciousness, and his style influenced younger writers. His writing "explores the problem of recovering idealism and cultural wholeness in an increasingly shallow and materialistic Irish society." Ó Súilleabháin was elected as a member of the Irish Academy of Letters and won more literary prizes than any other living Irish author.

He wrote a collection of poetry, Cosa Gréine, which was published and launched in Dublin in 2013, 28 years after his death.

== Irish republicanism ==
Ó Súilleabháin was an active Irish republican, particularly in publicizing the republican struggle, and was a member of Sinn Féin's ruling body beginning in 1971. He spent short periods in prison because of activities related to his political beliefs.

== Works ==
- Súil le Muir, Cló Mórainn, 1959 (for teenagers)
- Trá agus tuileadh, Sáirséal agus Dill, 1967 (for teenagers)
- Caoin tú féin, Sáirseál agus Dill, 1967
- An Uain Bheo, Sáirséal agus Dill, 1968
- Muintir, Sáirséal agus Dill, 1970 (short stories)
- Maeldún, Sáirséal agus Dill, 1972
- Dianmhuilte Dé, Sáirseál agus Dill, 1964
- Ciontach, Coiscéim 1983
- Aistear, Coiscéim, 1983
- Bealach Bó Finne, Coiscéim, 1988
- Lá Breá Gréine Buí and Oighear Geimhridh, Coiscéim 1994
