= Máirtín Ó Direáin =

Irish poet (1910–1988)

- Born: 29 November 1910; Inis Mór, County Galway, Ireland
- Died: 19 March 1988 (aged 77); Dublin, Ireland
- Resting place: Mount Jerome Cemetery, Dublin
- Occupations: poet, writer
- Spouse: Áine Colivet (m. 1945–1976, her death)
- Children: 1
- Writing career
- Pen name: Ruaidhrí Beag
- Language: Irish (Connacht Irish)
- Years active: 1949–1986
- Notable works: Rogha Dánta and Ó Mórna agus Dánta Eile
- Literary movement: Modern literature in Irish

Máirtín Ó Direáin ([ˈmˠaːɾˠtʲiːnʲ oː ˈdʲɪɾʲaːnʲ]; 29 November 1910 – 19 March 1988) was an Irish poet from the Aran Islands Gaeltacht. Along with Seán Ó Ríordáin and Máire Mhac an tSaoi, Ó Direáin was, in the words of Louis de Paor, "one of a trinity of poets who revolutionised Irish language poetry in the 1940s and 50s." According to a 1984 lecture by Desmond Egan, "Ó Direáin's genius stands revealed - to the extent that we must look abroad for poets with whom his achievement might best be compared; to Spain and Antonio Machado's sweet intensity; to Russia and Akhmatova; to Germany and the bittersweet music of Heinrich Heine."

== Biography ==
Ó Direáin was born in Sruthán on Inis Mór in the Aran Islands and was the eldest of the three sons and one daughter of Seán Ó Direáin and Mairéad Ní Dhireáin of Inis Mór. As was still common in the West of Ireland at the time, Ó Direáin grew up as a monoglot and spoke only Connacht Irish until his mid-teens. His father died prematurely in 1917 and left his widow with four children and less than 20 acres of farmland. Ó Direáin was educated at Onaght national school.

Like many other writers, poets, and intellectuals of the post-Irish War of Independence era, Ó Direáin chose to make a career in the Irish Civil Service. He worked first for the Department of Posts and Telegraphs in Galway City from 1928 to 1937, where Ó Direáin also served as the secretary of the city's chapter of Conradh na Gaeilge and sometime times also acted in Irish language stage plays. While living in Galway City, Ó Direáin also wrote an Irish-language stage play about the life of Russian Symbolist poet Alexander Blok for the Taibhdhearc theatre run by Micheál Mac Liammóir and Hilton Edwards.

Ó Direáin then lived and worked in Dublin, first for the Department of Posts and Telegraphs and then Department of Education, among, "the scurrying Lilliputians of the metropolis, the seangánfhir, or ant-people", from 1937 until 1975. After hearing a lecture in 1938 by prominent Gaelic revival poet and writer Tadhg Ó Donnchadha, Ó Direáin decided, by his own account, to dedicate his life to Modern literature in Irish and began writing poetry. Muiris Mac Conghail later disagreed in a 1988 article about his late friend, as he believed that Ó Direáin was already planning to be a poet even when he was still a child upon Inishmore.

At this time, Tadhg Ó Donnchadha and many other Gaelic revivalists like him favoured reviving both the Classical Gaelic literary language and Dán Díreach; the strict metres. Both had been traditionally used in the Irish bardic poetry composed in both Gaelic Ireland and the Highlands and Islands of Scotland and continued to be widely understood in both countries for at least a century after the bardic schools were closed down in the 17th-century. Instead of taking this approach, Ó Direáin, joined a few years later by fellow poets Seán Ó Ríordáin and Máire Mhac an tSaoi, spearheaded a revival of Modernist poetry, which had been lying dormant in Irish language verse since the execution by firing squad of Patrick Pearse following the Easter Rising in 1916.

Similarly to Ó Ríordáin and Mhac an tSaoi, Ó Direáin preferred using the Modern Irish he had grown up speaking in a living Gaeltacht community instead of older forms of the language. Ó Direáin differed radically from Mhac an tSaoi, however, who sometimes wrote Dán Díreach in the living Munster Irish dialect spoken around Dun Chaoin, in that he preferred emulating T.S. Eliot and writing poetry in rhythmically measured, but more loose and experimental verse forms inspired by the Amhrán metre oral poetry and Sean Nós songs he had learned in the ceilidh houses as a child upon Inishmore. The results were nothing less than revolutionary.

Ó Direáin published his first two poetry collections at his own expense in 1942 and 1943. In 1949, his selected poems became one of the first books published by Sáirséal agus Dill, a new publishing house for Modern literature in Irish.

Ó Direáin's early poetry celebrated the traditional cultural life he had known upon the Aran Islands and lamented both its passing and the mass migration to Ireland's major cities. One of his best-known poems, Stoite ("Uprooted"), contrasts traditional Irish rural life in union with seasonal rhythms and ancestral culture with the drab existence of urban civil servants and office workers. At the same time, as his poetry and other writings also reveal, Ó Direáin enjoyed, at least to an extent, the Irish-speaking literary and cultural life of both Galway City and Dublin.

While Ó Direáin was rooted deeply in the literature and oral tradition of Gaelic Ireland, his poetry also shows influence from throughout world literature. For example, Ó Direáin drew inspiration from both T.S. Eliot and William Butler Yeats, whose, "antipathy for 'the filthy modern tide'", matched his own. Even when delivering public lectures in the Irish language, Ó Direáin often quoted extensively from the poetry and essays of Eliot, in the original English.

From the literature of the Germanosphere, the philosophy of both Friedrich Nietzsche and Oswald Spengler further influenced Ó Direáin's, "apocalyptic sense of a civilisation in terminal decline." Another favorite modern writer who influenced Ó Direáin deeply was anti-communist Russian political refugee and philosopher Nikolai Berdyaev.

In a radical difference from the rejection of Catholic teaching on human sexuality found even during the 1950s in the poetry of Máire Mhac an tSaoi, Ó Direáin's poetry, both during and after the Emergency in Dublin, repeatedly displays the horror he felt as he witnessed the escalating collapse of Christian morality, the growing number of, "emasculated men" and the similar loss of feminity in women. Ó Direáin considered all three trends to be rooted in the (Irish: stoiteachas), or "Uprootedness", of Irish culture and Irish people in long English-speaking parts of the country.

Ó Direáin also went on the record as a harsh critic of feminism, but during an interview for the documentary An Carraig Stoite, a female Irish Civil Service colleague described Ó Direáin as a man who was always very gentlemanly towards his female coworkers. She described the Irish Civil Service of the era as an extremely depressing career for people of both genders.

During the same documentary, Ó Direáin's daughter, Niamh Ní Dhireáin, recalled the very deep love that her parents felt for each other and that the happiest times of her father's day were always after coming home to his family. Ó Direáin's vocal anti-feminism was accordingly rooted in his own preference for time with his family and his hatred of working in an urban office.

In an interview published posthumously, Ó Direáin went on the record saying that he thought women who chose to build their whole life around their job were either very foolish or very controlling in a manner he had often seen among male careerists. No one, he explained, should work a day job if they had another and better option. He also said, though, that he firmly believed that women who did the same job as men deserved to be paid the same wage.

He also published poetry eulogizing Grace O'Malley and the courage and the sacrifices made in the name of Irish republicanism by women during both the Easter Rising and the Irish War of Independence.

In 1952, Ó Direáin translated a play by Irish playwright Teresa Deevy for Radio Éireann; the play was called The King of Spain's Daughter (translated as Iníon Rí na Spáinne).

Ó Direáin's lifelong adherence to traditionalist conservatism, Roman Catholicism, Irish republicanism, and the anti-colonialist values of Official Ireland, further influenced his contempt for what he perceived as the mass Secularisation and greed-inspired Americanization of Irish culture beginning in the 1960s. His views on this era are best expressed in his poems Éire ina bhfuil romhainn ("Ireland in the Times Ahead") and Mar chaitheamar an choinneal ("As We Spent the Candle").

As he grew older, Ó Direáin increasingly mixed his literary and formalist idiom, the heart of which still remained, "the spoken language of the Gaeltacht", with much older influences, such as traditional bardic poetry in Classical Gaelic by Pádraigín Haicéad and Dáibhí Ó Bruadair, the 17th-century Protestant translation of the Christian Bible by Bishop William Bedell, as well as Patrick Dinneen's 1904 and 1927 dictionaries. Another influence upon Ó Direáin as he aged was the Postmodern literature and Irish language poetry composed by Casla, Connemara native and Tallaght schoolteacher Caitlín Maude.

Furthermore, during the early 1980s, Ó Direáin chose to take the risks of crossing what was still a "hard border" and the danger of falling victim to the ongoing paramilitary violence by Ulster Loyalists during The Troubles. Ó Direáin travelled to Northern Ireland and gave a poetry reading at the Cumann Chluain Ard, an urban language revival club in the Ulster Irish-speaking Gaeltacht Quarter of West Belfast.

In a November 1984 lecture in Ó Direáin's presence, Desmond Egan commented, "I have long considered him not only the finest Irish poet, writing in Irish, of our times; but more: that very embodiment of that Irish civilisation and ethos, that precious cultura which has now become a threatened species, the survival of which is by no means assured. Ó Direáin could - and with more justification than the Englishman - adopt Lytton Strachey's claim during The Great War to be, 'the civilisation for which you are fighting.'"

== Personal life ==
According to his English translator Frank Sewell, "It is evident from the poems that an early love affair and broken relationship haunts many of Ó Direáin's poems, even if he remains circumspect about the identity of the particular Aran-island Beatrice dei Bardi or Maude Gonne who set him off on the well-worn poets' path of longing for an absent Muse."

Máirtín Ó Direáin married Áine Colivet, a Dublin native of French descent, in 1945. They had one child, a daughter named Niamh Ní Dhireáin, in 1947. Ó Direáin's wife died in 1976.

== Death ==
His literary awards include the An Chomhairle Ealaíon/The Arts Council Awards (1964 and 1971); the Butler Prize, with Eoghan Ó Tuairisc (1967); the Ossian-Preis für Dichtung from the Freiherr vom Stein Foundation in Hamburg, West Germany (1977). He was also a member of Aosdána.

Máirtín Ó Direáin died in Dublin on 19 March 1988.

The texts of a series of lectures that Máirtín Ó Direáin had delivered on his own work in University College Dublin in 1969, were later edited by Eoghan Ó hAnluain and published posthumously in 2002 as Ón ulán ramhar siar.

== Legacy ==
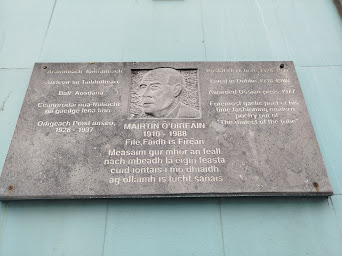
Memorial plaque in Galway

Carraig agus cathair: Ó Direáin is a recent (2002) biography. Its title ('The Rock and the City') refers to Ó Direáin's journey from his native rocky island to Dublin, where he lived most of his life.

An Charraig Stoite (The Uprooted Rock) is a 2003 award-nominated TG4/Bord Scannán na hÉireann funded documentary on Máirtín Ó Direáin which was written by Alan Titley and produced and directed by Mac Dara Ó Curraidhín.

On 27 May 2010, An Post (the Republic of Ireland's Post Office) issued a single stamp to commemorate the birth centenary of Máirtín Ó Direáin featuring a portrait of the poet.

In 2018, the University of Galway, celebrated the 30th anniversary of Ó Direáin's passing by making him one of the main themes of their annual celebration of Seachtain na Gaeilge. The title of the event and exhibit, which drew on university, State, and private archives, was "Máirtín Ó Direáin – Fathach File / Reluctant Modernist". Ó Direáin's daughter Niamh (née Ní Dhireáin) Sheridan, spoke at the event and was joined by her daughter and her grandson.

=== Legacy in Irish traditional music ===
Six of Ó Direáin's poems have been put to music by Irish traditional musician Colm Ó Snodaigh of the music group Kíla: Faoiseamh a Gheobhadsa, Maith Dhom, Bua na Mara, Dínit an Bhróin, "An tEarrach Thiar" and Bí i do Chrann. The first three were recorded on Handel's Fantasy, Luna Park (two Kíla albums) and Giving - Colm Ó Snodaigh's 2007 solo album.

Another more recent musical setting of Faoiseamh a Gheobhadsa was composed by Zoë Conway and her husband John McIntyre, who first recorded their arrangement as part of the album Allt, which is a collaboration with Scottish traditional musician Julie Fowlis and her husband Éamonn Doorley. A native speaker of the North Uist dialect of Scottish Gaelic, Julie Fowlis has performed the song alongside them, alternating verses in Scottish Gaelic with Zoë Conway singing the original Connacht Irish. Conway and McIntyre's musical setting of Ó Direáin's poem remains a very popular one, and they often perform it together on the concert stage.

== In translation ==
- In 2020, a collection of Ó Direáin's poems in Connaught Irish, along with translations into English by Frank Sewell, were published by Wake Forest University Press.
- In 2021, Wisconsin-based poet Margaret Noodin was inspired, after hearing Zoë Conway and John McIntyre's musical setting, to translate Máirtín Ó Direáin's poem Faoiseamh a Gheobhadsa from Connaught Irish into the Ojibwe language. In an essay about her translation, Noodin drew parallels between the ongoing language revival efforts by both the Irish people and the Ojibwe people, which are both, she explained, an effort to reverse the damage done by colonialism, linguistic imperialism, and the coercive Anglicisation of the educational system.

== Bibliography ==
His main works include the poetry collections:

- Coinnle Geala (1942)
- Dánta Aniar (1943)
- Rogha Dánta (1949)
- Ó Mórna agus Dánta Eile (1957)
- Ár Ré Dhearóil (1962)
- Cloch Choirnéil (1967)
- Crainn is Cairde (1970)
- Dánta 1939-79 (1980)
- Ceacht an Éin (1984)
- Béasa an Túir (1984)
- Tacar Dánta/Selected Poems (1984)
- Craobhóg: Dán (1986)
- Fear Lásta Lampaí (1928 - i nGaillimh/in Galway)

His autobiographical essays are collected as Feamainn Bhealtaine (1961).

- Iníon Rí na Spáinne (1952) Translation
