= Liam Gógan =

Irish Celticist and poet

Liam Seosamh Gógan (1891–1979), was an Irish civil servant, Celticist, lexicographer, and, in modern literature in Irish, a groundbreaking poet and playwright. According to Louis De Paor, Gógan was the most important poet of the era between the death of Patrick Pearse and the revival of literary Modernism in the Irish language during the 1940s. Gógan also possessed, according to De Paor, "a prodigious knowledge of all the spoken dialects of Irish and the Gaelic literary tradition."

== Life ==
Gógan was born in Dublin, at 391 North Circular Road, on 24 October 1891. His parents were William J. Gogan, the owner of a string of sweets shops and member of the Irish Republican Brotherhood, and Ellen (née Hendricks) Gogan. He began learning his heritage language through classes arranged by Conradh na Gaeilge and taught by Sinéad Flanagan, who was later to marry future Taoiseach Éamon de Valera and who Gógan later credited with instilling his passion for the Gaelic revival.

Gógan was educated by the Congregation of Christian Brothers at O'Connell School on North Richmond Street. He then attended University College Dublin, where he read Old Irish and graduated in 1913 with a first class honours in Celtic studies.

In 1913, he was elected to the provisional committee of the Irish Volunteers, and later appointed assistant secretary for pay. He often used to describe himself at the time as "Ireland's first civil servant". In 1914, Gógan was hired as assistant keeper of antiquities at the National Museum of Ireland. He resigned his position with the Irish Volunteers after a failed attempt to acquire arms in the United States. Even though a chronic limp had prevented him from serving in combat during the Easter Rising of 1916, he was imprisoned afterwards for three months at Frongoch internment camp in Wales. After refusing to take an oath of allegiance to King George V following his release, he was dismissed from his post in the National Museum of Ireland.

During subsequent years, Gógan taught Irish language classes in County Tipperary for Conradh na Gaeilge, as a merchant in one of his father's shops, and as an organizer for the Sinn Féin political party. Following the end of the Irish War of Independence in 1922, he was reinstated to his former position at the National Museum, and he remained working at the museum until his retirement in 1956. In 1925, Gógan received a Master of Arts for a thesis on architectural terminology in the Irish language.

Gógan died in Dublin on 4 December 1979 and was buried at Mount Jerome Cemetery in Harold's Cross.

== Personal life ==
Gógan was married twice. In 1919, he married County Cork native Máire Nic Fhirbhisigh. Six children were born before her death in 1940. In 1955, Gógan remarried Nóra Marie Ní Aodha.

== Writings ==
In addition to being multilingual and having a competent grasp of French, German, Spanish, and Italian, Gógan also had, according to De Paor, an encyclopedic knowledge of the Western canon, which all found their way into his poetry. It has been said that Gógan was also the first poet to write sonnets in the Irish language.

Colm Breathnach, who set out to re-popularize Gógan's poetry during the 2017 Imram literary festival, has said of Gógan, "He was a moderniser, he was trying to develop the language. He employed old words and forms, he coined new words (particularly compound words) from the existing resources of the language and mixed various dialectical usages throughout his work. Readers often found it difficult to follow these experiments... Some of his work would resonate with people today, he has a lot of love poetry, other works would portray urban angst, others are in a household setting."

As a Celticist, linguist, and philologist, Gógan is also traditionally credited with coining, at the request of future Easter Rising leader Thomas MacDonagh, (Irish: poblacht), the word in Modern Irish for "republic", based on the root word (Irish: pobal), meaning "public".

Gógan was also very passionate about Irish language drama. In addition to writing his award-winning original stage play An Saoghal Eile, Gógan also translated a Symbolist play by Maurice Maeterlinck into the Irish language as Dallán.

== Lexicography ==
Unlike most other Irish language poets, who choose to compose in particular regional dialects, Gógan believed that a standardized form of Modern Irish, similarly to those found in other European countries, needed to be developed. Strongly opposed, similarly to Académie Française, to allowing borrowings from other languages, Gógan believed that the basis for the new standard Irish should be in older forms of the language and particularly in Old Irish and Classical Gaelic, the literary language once taught in the Bardic schools of both Ireland and the Scottish Highlands and Islands. Although Gógan's theories have succeeded to a point and there is now a standard literary form of Irish, David Wheatley has described Gógan's poetry, as "knotty", "undervalued", and, due to his linguistic experiments, sometimes extremely difficult to understand or to translate. While trying to translate Gógan into English, Wheatley has written that he often thought of Myles na gCopaleen's famous quip about the literary use of previously unknown Irish language terms, "I don't think those words are in Séadhna."

Between 1923 and 1927, Gógan assisted Patrick Dinneen in revising his standard Irish-English dictionary. In 1953, Gógan was requested by the Irish Texts Society to prepare a supplement to the same dictionary. Gógan amassed more than 50,000 entries, but the supplement was not published due to lack of funding, and to his refusal to accept any cuts. Only during the early 21st-century did the dictionary begin being digitized and made available online.
