= Máire Mhac an tSaoi =

Irish writer, poet, linguist, and academic (1922–2021)

- Born: Máire MacEntee; 4 April 1922; Dublin, Ireland
- Died: 16 October 2021 (aged 99)
- Spouse: Conor Cruise O'Brien
- Children: Patrick and Margaret (adopted)
- Father: Seán MacEntee
- Relatives: Michael Browne (uncle); Pádraig de Brún (uncle)

Máire Mhac an tSaoi (4 April 1922 – 16 October 2021) was an Irish civil service diplomat, writer of Modernist poetry in the Corca Dhuibhne dialect of Munster Irish, a memoirist, and a highly important figure within modern literature in Irish. Along with Seán Ó Ríordáin and Máirtín Ó Direáin, Máire Mhac an tSaoi was, in the words of Louis de Paor, "one of a trinity of poets who revolutionised Irish language poetry in the 1940s and 50s."

== Early life ==
Mhac an tSaoi was born as Máire MacEntee in Dublin in 1922. Her father, Seán MacEntee, was born in Belfast and was a veteran of the Irish Volunteers during the Easter Rising of 1916 and the subsequent Irish War of Independence, and of the Anti-Treaty IRA during the Irish Civil War. MacEntee was also a founding member of Fianna Fáil, a long-serving TD and Tánaiste in the Dáil. Her mother, County Tipperary-born Margaret Browne (or de Brún) was also an Irish republican.

Her maternal uncle was the Traditionalist Catholic Cardinal Michael Browne, who was Master of the Dominican Order and, in his later life, a friend and ally of Archbishop Marcel Lefebvre.

Máire's mother was a distinguished Celticist who taught courses in Irish literature in the Irish language at Alexandra College and University College Dublin. So she grew up immersed in both the literary canon of Irish bardic poetry and in "the medieval aristocratic tradition of courtly love poems in Irish."

In her memoir The Same Age as the State, Mhac an tSaoi recalled how her mother's students would always recall, "the extraordinary phenomenon of a warm and witty twentieth century, middle-aged, middle-class lady entering completely into the mind of the medieval Gaelic poet in his lighter moments, and communicating her understanding and her enjoyment to her hearers."

She was also, according to Louis de Paor, just as influenced by her stays in the Dingle Peninsula of West County Kerry with her uncle, Monsignor De Brún. Monsignor de Brún, similarly to his sister, was a distinguished linguist and Celticist, the literary translator of Homer, Dante Alighieri, Sophocles, and Racine into Modern Irish, "and one of the most distinguished literary figures of his time."

In addition to his priestly duties, the Monsignor was studying the living Corca Dhuibhne dialect of Munster Irish as it was spoken in his parish of Dún Chaoin. As Louis de Paor writes, Mhac an tSaoi discovered while visiting her uncle in Dún Chaoin, "a living tradition and a community conscious of its literary and linguistic inheritance, a world in which verbal artistry by accomplished speakers capable of responding to the impulse of the momentum sophisticated extemporary compositions. The extent to which the Gaeltacht of her early life was an imagined as well as an actual place has been acknowledged by the poet herself, but her relationship to 'the miraculous parish,' of Dún Chaoin is both the cornerstone of both her poetry and her poetics."

Máire studied Modern Languages and Celtic Studies at University College Dublin, before going to further research at the Dublin Institute for Advanced Studies and at the Sorbonne.

== Literary career ==
Máire Mhac an tSaoi wrote the famous work of Christian poetry in Munster Irish, Oíche Nollag ("Christmas Eve"), when she was only 15-years of age.

According to Louis de Paor, "Máire Mhac an tSaoi spent two years studying in post-war Paris (1945–47) before joining the Irish diplomatic service, and was working at the Irish embassy in Madrid, during Franco's regime, when she committed herself to writing poetry in Irish following her discovery of the works of Federico Garcia Lorca. The tension between religious beliefs, contemporary social mores, and the more transgressive elements of female desire is central to the best of her work from the 1940s and early 1950s. Both her deference to traditional patterns of language and verse and her refusal of traditional morality might be read as a reaction to the social, moral, and cultural upheaval of a world at war."

She remained a prolific poet and was credited, along with Seán Ó Ríordáin and Máirtín Ó Direáin, with reintroducing literary modernism into Irish literature in the Irish-language, where it had been dormant since the 1916 execution of Patrick Pearse, in the years and decades following World War II. According to de Paor, "Máire Mhac an tSaoi's poetry draws on the vernacular spoken by the native Irish speakers of the Munster Gaeltacht of West Kerry during the first half of the twentieth century. Formally, she draws on the song metres of the oral tradition and on older models from the earlier literary tradition, including the syllabic metres of the early modern period. The combination of spoken dialect enhanced by references and usages drawn from the older literature, and regular metrical forms contribute to a poetic voice that seems to resonate with the accumulated authority of an unbroken tradition. In the later work, she explores looser verse forms but continues to draw on the remembered dialect of Dún Chaoin and on a scholarly knowledge of the older literature."

In a 1988 article for the literary journal Innti, Mhac an tSaoi wrote about her childhood in the Dingle Peninsula Gaeltacht, (Irish: "Mhaireas os cionn leathchéad bhliain ins an chluthairreacht san, á iompar timpeall liom im intinn go dtí gur dhúisíos ó chianaibhín agus go bhfuaireas mo chruinne ché leata ar an art agus ceiliúrtha. Tá sé ródhéanach agam malairt timpeallachta a chuardach. Deirtí go mba phioróid é an cainteoir dúchais deireannach a mhair de chuid Bhreatain Chorn, agus gur chónaigh sé I Ringsend. Mise an phioróid sin.").

"I lived in that warmth for more than fifty years, carrying it around with me in my head until I woke a short time ago and found my world scattered to the wind, dispersed. It is too late for me to look for another habitat. It used to be said that the last native speaker of Cornish was a parrot and that he lived in Ringsend. I am that parrot.".

She was elected to Aosdána in 1996 but resigned in 1997 after Francis Stuart was elevated to the position of Saoi. Mhac an tSaoi had voted against Stuart because of his role as an Abwehr spy and in radio propaganda broadcasts from Nazi Germany aimed at neutral Ireland during World War II.

Mhac an tSaoi had a lifelong passion for the Irish language, and was one of the leading authorities on Munster Irish.

In 2001, Mhac an tSaoi published an award-winning novel A Bhean Óg Ón... about the relationship between the 17th-century County Kerry poet and Irish clan chief, and folk hero Piaras Feiritéar and Meg Russell, the woman for whom he composed some of the greatest works of love poetry ever written in the Irish language.

Her poems "Jack" and An Bhean Óg Ón both featured on the Leaving Certificate Irish course, at both Higher and Ordinary Levels, from 2006 to 2010.

Mhac an tSaoi's literary translation of Rainer Maria Rilke's Duino Elegies from Austrian German into the Irish language was published in 2013.

== Personal life ==
After their relationship became public when she travelled with him to the Republic of the Congo when he was chosen by Secretary-General Dag Hammarskjöld as the United Nations representative there during the Katanga Crisis, in 1962, she married Irish politician, writer, and historian Conor Cruise O'Brien (1917–2008) in a Roman Catholic Wedding Mass in Dublin.

This made Mhac an tSaoi the stepmother to O'Brien's children from his 1939 civil marriage. Mhac an tSaoi's mother was deeply embarrassed by the exposure of the relationship and staunchly opposed the match, as she had long been a close friend of O'Brien's Presbyterian first wife. Despite their subsequent marriage, the exposure of their extramarital relationship ended Mhac an tSaoi's diplomatic and civil service career.

The O'Briens later adopted two children, Patrick and Margaret.

Máire then lived with her husband in New York City, where he became a professor at New York University (NYU) after the Congo Crisis destroyed O'Brien's diplomatic career. Conor Cruise O'Brien was long blamed by the United Nations for the escalation of the Congo Crisis. In the 2016 film The Siege of Jadotville, O'Brien is depicted by actor Mark Strong as a bureaucratic and criminally incompetent diplomat who is repeatedly outgunned and outmanoeuvred by Katangese breakaway state leader Moïse Tshombe. According to Louis de Paor, though, "One of the most powerful passages in [Mhac an tSaoi's memoir] The Same Age as the State recounts an apparent attempt to assassinate Dr O'Brien in Katanga."

Mhac an tSaoi and her husband, who was then serving as Albert Schweitzer Professor of the Humanities at the University of New York (NYU) were both staunchly opposed to the Vietnam War. They were both arrested by the NYPD, along with Dr. Benjamin Spock and Beat Poet Allen Ginsberg, during an allegedly violent protest outside a United States military induction centre in New York City on 5 December 1967. Afterwards, during an interview with the New York Times, Mhac an tSaoi accused the NYPD of using excessive force both during and after her husband's arrest. Decades later, Mhac an tSaoi recalled with amusement that a telegram arrived for her husband, which asked, "Hear you got kicked by a cop. What was his ethnicity?"

She later returned with O'Brien to live in Dublin, where she attended another protest rally against the Vietnam War along O'Connell Street in 1969.

== List of works ==
Mhac an tSaoi wrote:

- Margadh na Saoire (Baile Átha Cliath: Sáirséal agus Dill, 1956)
- Codladh an Ghaiscigh (1973)
- An Galar Dubhach (1980)
- An Cion go dtí Seo (1987)
- "Writing In Modern Irish — A Benign Anachronism?", The Southern Review, 31 Special Issue on Irish Poetry (1995)
- The Same Age as the State, O'Brien Press, Dublin ISBN 0-86278-885-4; ISBN 978-0-86278-885-8
- Cérbh í Meg Russell?, Leabhar Breac, ISBN 978-0-89833-232-2 (2008).
- Scéal Ghearóid Iarla, Leabhar Breac, ISBN 978-0-898332-53-7 (2010).

Mhac an tSaoi and O'Brien together wrote:

- A Concise History of Ireland, Thames and Hudson, London ISBN 0-500-45011-0 (1972)

Mhac an tSaoi translated Rainer Maria Rilke:

- Marbhnaí Duino (Duineser Elegien), Leabhar Breac, ISBN 978-0-898332-84-1 (2013)
