= Liam Ó Muirthile =

Irish poet (1950–2018)

Liam Ó Muirthile (15 November 1950 – 18 May 2018) was a prominent Irish-language poet who also wrote plays and novels, he was also a journalist. Ó Muirthile originally came to the fore as a member of a group of poets from University College Cork who collaborated in the journal Innti in the late 1960s.

== Biography ==
He was born in Cork in 1950 and was educated there. He took a BA in Irish and French at UCC. His Irish was acquired at school and from sojourns in the Gaeltacht of West Kerry. He was a member of a group of poets at University College Cork in the late 1960s who chose Irish as a creative medium and were closely associated with the modernist poetry journal Innti, founded by fellow poet Michael Davitt (1950–2005). They were influenced by the work of Cork poet Seán Ó Ríordáin, by the musician and composer Seán Ó Riada, and by popular American culture.

Greg Delanty, writing for Poetry International, claimed that a fundamental achievement of Ó Muirthile and other members of the Innti group was to adapt the language to a contemporary urban landscape in a way that reflected the counterculture of the sixties.

== Writing ==
Ó Muirthile has been described as a poet of immense formal and musical mastery who read deeply into the classical and neo-classical poetry of the Irish language. He studied French literature as a student and this influenced his work. He translated poetry by Guillaume Apollinaire, François Villon, Jacques Prévert and Anne Hébert.

His first collection of poetry was Tine Chnámh (1984). This received the Irish American Cultural Institute’s literary award and an Oireachtas prize for poetry. He subsequently published a number of other collections. In 1996 he received the Butler Award for his novel Ar Bhruach na Laoi. Several plays by him have been staged. From 1989 to 2003 he wrote a weekly column, “An Peann Coitianta,” for the Irish Times. Poems by him have been translated into English, German, French, Italian, Hungarian and Romanian.

Two of his poems, Meachán Rudaí and Áthas have been put to music by the Irish/American group The Gloaming and feature on their third studio album The Gloaming 3.

== Bibliography ==
=== Poetry ===
Tine Cnámh. Sáirseál Ó Marcaigh, Dublin 1984.

Dialann Bóthair. Gallery Press, Oldcastle 1992.

Walking Time. Cló Iar-Chonnacht, Galway 2000.

Dánta Déanta. Cois Life, Dublin 2005.

An Seileitleán agus véarsaí seilí eilí. Cois Life, Dublin 2005.

Sanas. Cois Life, Dublin 2007.

Wood Cutting: New and Selected Poems. Cois Life, Dublin 2014.

Camino de Santiago: Dánta, poems, poemas. Cois Life, Dublin 2018.

=== Essays / Non-fiction ===
An Peann Coitianta. Comhar, Dublin 1992.

An Peann Coitianta 2. Cois Life, Dublin 1997.

Ar an bPeann. Cois Life, Dublin 2005.

Rogha Alt: An Peann Coitianta 1989–2003. Cois Life, Dublin 2013.

Oilithreach pinn. Cois Life, Dublin 2017.

=== Fiction ===
Ar Bhruach na Laoi. Comhar, Dublin 1995.

Gaothán. Cois Life, Dublin 2000.

Sister Elizabeth ag eitilt. Cois Life, Dublin 2005.

=== Drama ===
Tine Chnámh. Sáirséal Ó Marcaigh, Dublin 1984. Revised and adapted for stage by Liam Ó Muirthile and Michael Scott.

Fear an Tae. Cois Life, Dublin 1999.

Liodán na hAbhann. Cois Life, Dublin 2001.
