= Mayfield, Cork =

Suburb of Cork city, Ireland

Mayfield Baile na mBocht
- Suburb
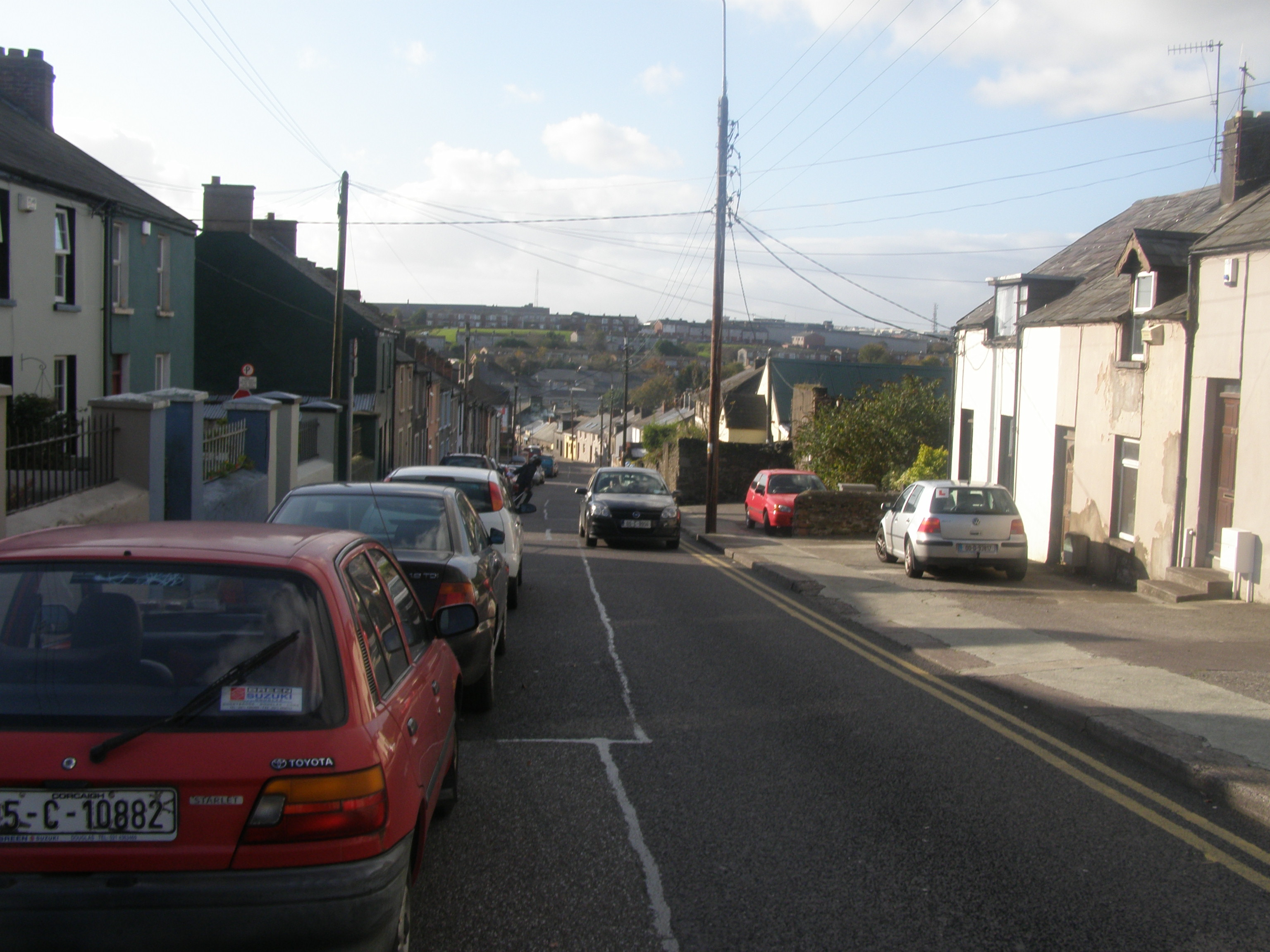
- Old Youghal Road, Mayfield

- Location in Ireland
- Coordinates: 51°54′48″N 08°26′03″W
- Country: Ireland
- Province: Munster
- Administrative area: Cork (city)
- Time zone: UTC+0 (WET)
  - Summer (DST): UTC-1 (IST (WEST))

Mayfield, historically Ballinamought (from Irish Baile na mBocht, meaning 'town of the poor'), is a suburb on the north-side of Cork city, Ireland. Mayfield is part of the Dáil constituency of Cork North-Central.

== Name ==
The area was originally called Baile na mBocht in Irish and Anglicised as "Ballinamought". A number of works, including those of etymologist and historian Patrick Weston Joyce, translate Baile na mBocht as "town of the poor [people]". Other sources translate it as "town of the sick", as the area was reputedly the site of a medieval leper colony. A path leading from the area towards the river, known in Irish as Siúl na Lobhar (literally 'Lepers Walk') is known in English as "Lover's Walk".

== Geography ==
Mayfield is 3 km north-east of the city centre. It is bounded to the north by the Glen River Valley, an aquiferous geological formation produced by a receding glacier during the last ice age. Habitats, flora and fauna within the area include the small cudweed and the sand martin, a migratory bird species that returns from North Africa each spring to breed in the porous sand cliffs along sections of the river valley north.

== Notable people ==
- Michael Davitt, poet
- Dara Murphy, former Lord Mayor of Cork
- Roy Keane, Irish footballer, was born and grew up in Mayfield
- James Coughlan, Irish rugby union player for Munster
- Kieran Murphy, former Cork senior hurling captain

== See also ==
- List of towns and villages in Ireland
