= Rita Kelly =

Irish poet (born 1953)

Rita Kelly (born 1953) is an Irish poet from Ballinasloe in eastern County Galway who now lives in an old lock house along the river Barrow between Athy and Carlow. She has published several collections of poetry and has been featured in a number of magazines and journals. Her poems Mé sa ghluaisteán leat (In the car with you) and Is bronntanas na maidine thú (You are the morning's gift) were featured in Filíocht Ghrá na Gaeilge. She was married to the writer Eoghan Ó Tuairisc from 1972 until his death in 1982.

== Bibliography ==
- Dialann sa Díseart 1981
- An Bealach Éadóigh 1984
- The Whispering Arch and Other Stories 1986
- Fare Well - Beir Beannacht 1990
- Travelling West 2000
