= Seachtain na Gaeilge =

Irish language festival

- Genre: Irish language festival
- Frequency: 1–17 March annually
- Country: Ireland
- Years active: 1902; 124 years ago
- Founder: Conradh na Gaeilge
- Major events: Céilís; competitions; concerts; parades; quizzes
- Website: snag.ie

Seachtain na Gaeilge (transl. "Irish Language Week"), is an annual international festival promoting the Irish language and culture, both in Ireland and all around the world. Established in 1902, it is the biggest Irish language festival in the world, reaching over 1 million people on 5 continents each year.

== Events ==
The festival lasts seventeen days and begins on St. David's Day on 1 March and runs until St Patrick's Day on 17 March each year, with community-organised events celebrated all over Ireland and the world, such as céilís, concerts, quizzes, competitions and parades. Many sporting events are organised during Seachtain na Gaeilge.

== History ==
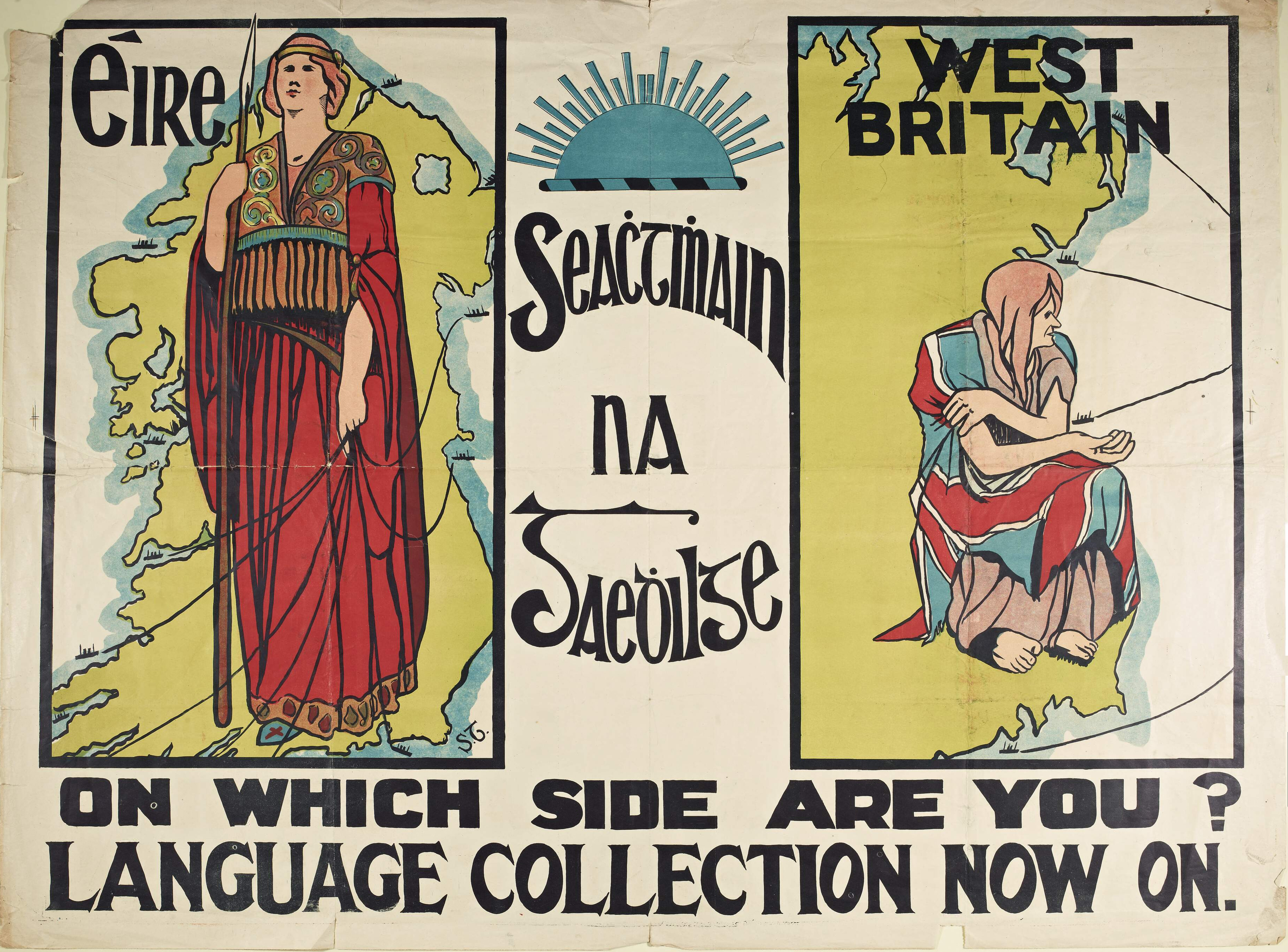
Seachtain na Gaeilge poster from the National Museum of Ireland, 1913

Seachtain na Gaeilge was founded as part of the Gaelic Revival by Conradh na Gaeilge in 1902. Like its earliest Irish ancestors, the 14th-century Gairm Sgoile ("Summoning", "Gathering", "of the [Bardic] School") and the 18th-century Munster Cúirt ("Poetic Court), Seachtain na Gaeilge includes a contest between composers of Irish poetry in the Irish-language.

Energia was a sponsor of the festival from 2017 to 2025.

In 2018, the University of Galway, celebrated the 30th anniversary of Connaught Irish Modernist poet Máirtín Ó Direáin's death by making him one of the main themes of their annual celebration of Seachtain na Gaeilge. The title of the event and exhibit, which drew on university, State, and private archives, was "Máirtín Ó Direáin – Fathach File / Reluctant Modernist". Ó Direáin's daughter Niamh (née Ní Dhireáin) Sheridan, spoke at the event, and was joined by her daughter and her grandson.
