= Biddy Jenkinson =

Irish poet, short story writer and dramatist

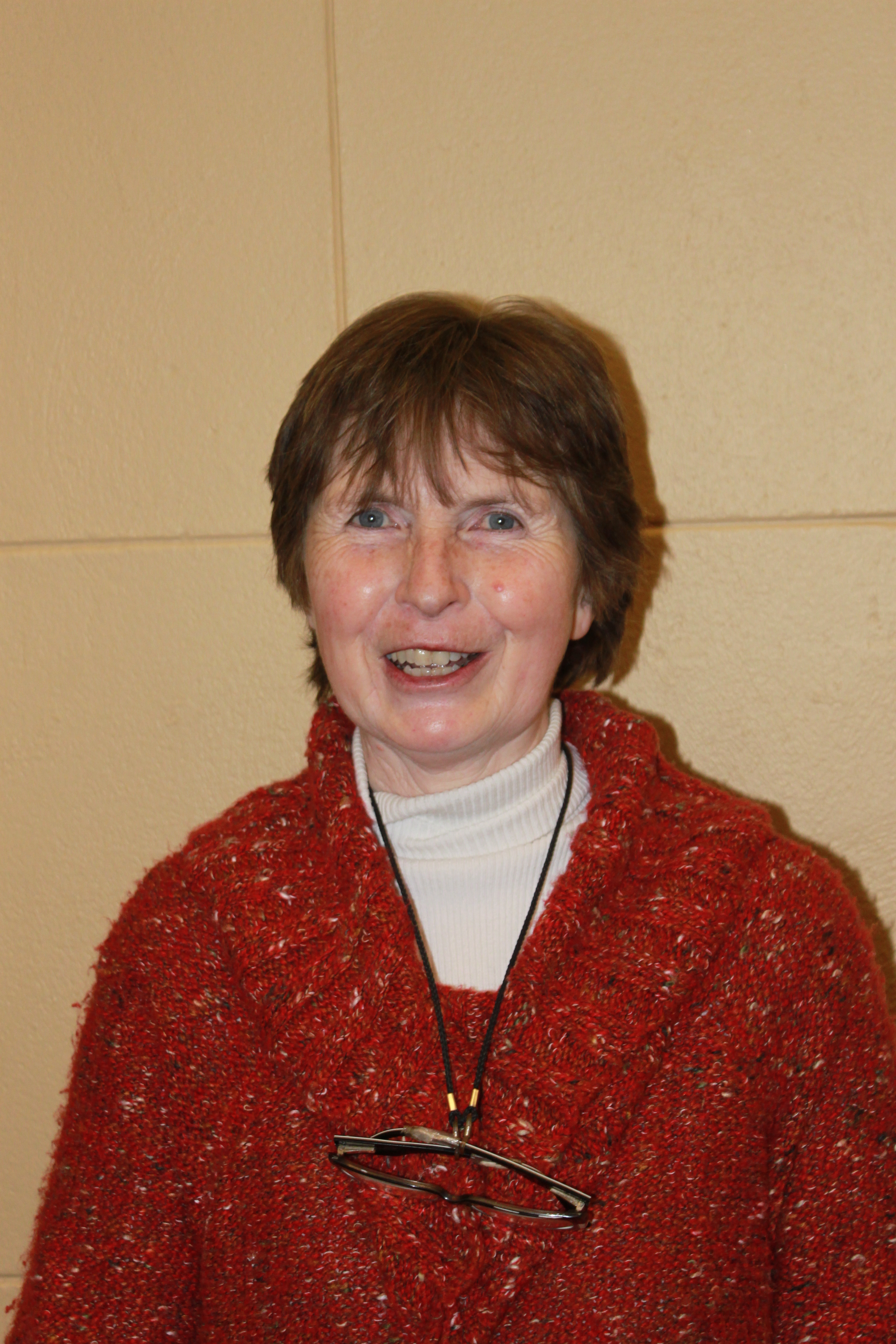
- Born: 1949 (age 76–77); Dublin, Ireland
- Education: University College Cork
- Occupations: Poet; short story writer
- Writing career
- Pen name: Biddy Jenkinson
- Language: Irish

Biddy Jenkinson (a pseudonym) is an Irish poet, short story writer and dramatist who writes in the Irish language. She was born in 1949 in Dublin and attended University College Cork. She has published several collections of verse, two collections of short stories and two plays.

It has been said of Jenkinson that she seeks to recreate a sense of the sacral world of nature and women’s role in sustaining it. She has a deep interest in literary tradition. Her chosen creative language is Irish and she has expressed her opposition to ‘the insistence that everything written in Irish be translated immediately into English’. Her work has been praised for its passion, humour and variety.

She was editor of Éigse Éireann/Poetry Ireland Review from 2000 to 2001.

== Published work ==
=== Poetry ===
- Sceilg na Scál (Coiscéim 2017)
- TáinRith (Coiscéim 2013)
- Oíche Bhealtaine (Coiscéim 2005)
- Mis (Coiscéim 2001)
- Rogha dánta (anthology) ed. Siobhán Ní Fhoghlú and Seán Ó Tuama (Cork University Press 1999)
- Amhras Neimhe (Coiscéim 1997)
- Dán na hUidhre (Coiscéim 1991)
- Uiscí Beatha (Coiscéim 1988)
- Baisteadh Gintlí (Coiscéim 1986)

=== Short stories ===
- Duinnín - Bleachtaire - Ar An Sceilg (Coiscéim 2011)
- An tAthair Pádraig Ó Duinnín - Bleachtaire (Coiscéim 2008)
- An Grá Riabhach - Gáirscéalta (Coiscéim 2000)

=== Plays ===
- Mise, Subhó agus Maccó (Cló Iar-Chonnacht 2000)
- Oh, Rahjerum! (Coiscéim 1998)

=== Books for Children ===
- An Bhanríon Bess agus Gusaí Gaimbín (Coiscéim 2007), in association with Ribó
- Mo Scéal Féin xx Púca (Coiscéim 2004), illustrated by Ribó
