= Sáirséal agus Dill =

- Formation: 1945
- Founders: Seán Sáirséal Ó hÉigeartaigh; Bríd Ní Mhaoileoin
- Dissolved: 2009
- Headquarters: Dublin, Ireland
- Fields: Irish language Irish culture Gaelic revival

Sáirséal agus Dill (Irish: [ˈsˠaɾˠʃeːlˠ ˌaɡəsˠ ˈdʲiːl̠ʲ]; "Sarsfield and Dill") was a publisher of Irish-language books based in Dublin, Ireland.

== History ==
The company was founded in 1945 by Seán Sáirséal Ó hÉigeartaigh (1917–1967) and his wife Bríd Ní Mhaoileoin, with the help of a legacy left to him by his aunt, Elizabeth Dill Smyth. Ó hÉigeartaigh was the son of historian and writer P. S. O'Hegarty.

The first book published was Tonn Tuile, by Séamus Ó Néill, on 30 September 1947.

The company quickly became the country's pioneering and most important Irish-language publishing house, and published such illustrious works as Máirtín Ó Cadhain’s Cré na Cille and the poetry of Seán Ó Ríordáin and Máire Mhac an tSaoi. Other authors included Niall Ó Dónaill, Micheál Mac Liammóir, Donncha Ó Céileachair, Liam Ó Flaithearta, Seán Ó Lúing, Leon Ó Broin and Annraoi Ó Liatháin.

Anne Yeats (1919–2001), daughter of poet W. B. Yeats, designed many of the covers for the company's books over a twenty-year period from 1957.

Seán Ó hÉigeartaigh died at his place of work in the company on 14 June 1967. His wife Bríd took over leadership of the business, and published another fifty books.

The company was renamed Sáirséal Ó Marcaigh when Caoimhín Ó Marcaigh assumed control in 1981. It was acquired by Cló Iar-Chonnachta in 2009.
