= Tomás Mac Síomóin =

Irish biological researcher (1938–2022)

Tomás Mac Síomóin (19 February 1938 – 17 February 2022) was an Irish doctoral graduate of Cornell University, New York, who worked as a biological researcher and university lecturer in the US and Ireland. He worked as a journalist, as editor of the newspaper Anois and for many years was editor of the literary and current affairs magazine, Comhar. He wrote in Irish and published both poetry and fiction in that language.

== Biography ==
He was born in Dublin. His story Cinn Lae Seangáin (“The Diary of an Ant”) won the award for best short story collection in the Oireachtas 2005 competition, while in the following year his novel An Tionscadal (“The Project”) won the main Oireachtas literary award.

His poems, stories, articles and translations from Catalan and Spanish have appeared in diverse publications. His novel, Ceallaigh (2009), was written in Cuba; it challenges some common assumptions about contemporary Cuban life and history.

His work has been translated into many languages, most recently into Slovenian, Romanian and Catalan. He lived and worked since circa 1998 in Catalonia.

Tomás Mac Síomóin died on 17 February 2022, at the age of 83.

== Published works ==
=== Short stories ===
- Diary of an Ant (Nuascéalta, 2013) English translation of Cín Lae Seangáin agus Scéalta Eile.
- Cín Lae Seangáin agus Scéalta Eile (Coiscéim, 2005)
- Einsamkeit in Erkundungen-30 irische Erzähler (Verlag Volk und Welt. Berlin, 1979)

=== Poetry ===
- File ar Fhile: Dánta Antonio Machado (Cois Life, 2019)
- 21 dán/poemes/poemas (Coiscéim, 2010), collected poems in Irish, Catalan and Spanish
- Scian (Sáirséal Ó Marcaigh, 1991)
- Cré agus Cláirseach (Sáirséal Ó Marcaigh, 1983)
- Codarsnaí (Clódhanna Teo., 1981)
- Damhna agus Dánta eile (Sáirséal & Dill, 1974)

=== Novels ===
- Is Stacey Pregnant?: Notes from the Irish Dystopia (Nuascéalta, 2014), an English translation of An bhfuil Stacey ag iompar?
- The Cartographer's Apprentice: A 21st Century Fable (Nuascéalta, 2013), an English translation of An Tionscadal
- An bhfuil Stacey ag iompar? (Coiscéim, 2011)
- Ceallaigh (Coiscéim, 2009)
- An Tionscadal (Coiscéim, 2007)
- In inmhe (Coiscéim, 2004)
- Ag altóir an diabhail: striptease spioradálta Bheartla B (Coiscéim, 2003)

=== Non-fiction ===
- The Gael becomes Irish: An Unfinished Odyssey (Nuascéalta, 2020)
- Fuego Verde: Sangre Celta en las Venas de América Latina (Nuascéalta, 2018)
- Raghallach na Fola/O'Reilly Hasta La Muerte (Coiscéim, 2015)
- The Broken Harp:Identity and Language in Modern Ireland (Nuascéalta, 2014)
- Mharaíodar/Asesinaron Camila (Coiscéim, 2012)
- Nasc na Fola (An Gúm, 2011)
- Na/Los Patricios (Coiscéim, 2011)

=== Anthologies ===
- Three Leaves of a Bitter Shamrock (Nuascéalta, 2014)
- Best European Fiction 2013 (Dalkey Archive Press, 2012), Aleksandar Hemon (series editor), John Banville (preface)
- The Willow's Whisper: A Transatlantic Compilation of Poetry from Ireland and Native America (Cambridge Scholars Publishing, 2011), Jill M. O Mahony and Mícheál Ó hAodha, editors
- Irish Writing in the Twentieth Century: a Reader (Cork University Press, 2000), David Pierce, editor
- Das zweimaleins des Steins-Poesie aus Irland. (Die horen, Bremerhaven, 1998)
- Poetry Ireland Review 39: Autumn 1993: Special Issue: Contemporary Poetry in Irish (Colour Books, 1993), Seán Ó Cearnaigh, editor
- Irish Poetry Now: Other Voices (Merlin Publishing, 1993), Gabriel Fitzmaurice, editor
- Dánta in An Crann Faoi Bhláth/The Flowering Tree (Eag: Declan Kiberd agus Gabriel Fitzmaurice, Wolfhound, B.Á.C. 1991)

=== Translations ===
- Pedro Páramo (Coiscéim, 2008), aistriúchán ón Spáinnis ar úrscéal Meicsiceánach de chuid Juan Rulfo.
- Na cathracha caillte (Coiscéim, 2004), aistriúcháin ar dánta Spáinnise Ernesto Cardenal.
- Selected poems /Tacar dánta (Goldsmith Press, 1984), bilingual selection of poems by Máirtín Ó Díreáin in collaboration with Douglas Sealy.
- Mo Chroí san Afraic (An Gúm, 2002), translation of El meu cor es diu Africa, a Catalan novel for teenagers by Victor Mora, in collaboration with Carl Mac Gabhann.

=== Essays ===
- "Cultura literària en llengua irlandesa: Cruïlla o final de viatge" (Revista CIDOB d'Afers Internacionals, 2010)
- Faoin Bhratach Dhearg (Coiscéim i gcomhar le Red Banner, 2007)
- Macallaí na Cásca 1 1916: Leath-réabhlóid. Paradacsa ait na Gaeilge (Coiscéim, 2006)
- Ó Mhársa go Magla: straitéis nua don Ghaeilge (Coiscéim, 2006).
- Ceachtanna ón gCatalóin: teanga i ngleic le nualiobrálachas (Coiscéim, 2005)
- Tuairisc ón bPluais: poblachtánachas agus litríocht in aois na scáth (Coiscéim, 2004).
- Poet of Conscience: The Old and the New in the Poetry of Sorley MacLean (Scottish Academic Press, 1986)

== See also ==
- Caoimhghin Ó Croidheáin
