= Michael Davitt (poet) =

Irish poet (1950-2005)

- Born: 20 April 1950; Mayfield Cork, Ireland
- Died: 19 June 2005 (aged 55); Sligo Connacht, Ireland
- Occupation: Poet

Michael Davitt (20 April 1950 – 19 June 2005) was an Irish poet who published in the Irish language. He has been characterised as "...one of modern Ireland's finest poets in either of the nation's languages and key figure in the 1970s Irish Language poetry movement".

== Early life and education ==
Davitt was born and raised in Mayfield in Cork City. He was educated in St Patrick's Boys National School and the North Monastery. He then attended University College Cork where he pursued Celtic Studies. After leaving the university, Davitt moved to Dublin where he worked as a teacher and with Gael Linn, an Irish cultural organisation.

== Poetry ==
Although Davitt wrote in Irish, it was not his first language. A successor to Seán Ó Ríordáin, whose first language was also English, his work was considered avant-garde with urban and rural tones in combination, and an expression of "...a belief in language as the locus of personal and ... national and international self-definition." The importance of location in which the real and imaginary worlds are part of one another is another major theme of his work.

Analytic and intellectual, Davitt's poetry is infused with a self-awareness of his choice of language, and incorporates some English words, which seem to act as a challenge to the poet to validate the use of Irish in any topic, breaking those ties to traditional forms which might limit his "contemporary imagination." The confrontation of traditional Irish culture and modern English culture is a core theme in many of his works. As he put it, "What is important is to continue believing in the Irish language as a vibrant creative power while it continues to be marginalised in the process of cultural McDonaldisation..."

Described as an "impresario" for Irish language poetry, in 1970 Davitt founded the journal Innti.

== Production and direction work ==
Davitt worked for Raidió Teilifís Éireann (RTÉ) as a presenter from 1985–1988, and subsequently as a producer and director through the 1990s. His production credits include the television documentaries Joe Heaney: Sing the Dark Away (1996) and John Montague: Rough Fields. He took early retirement to devote himself to writing, travelling between Ireland and France with partner Moira Sweeney.

== Recognition and death ==
In 1994, Davitt was awarded the Butler Prize by the Irish American Cultural Institute.

In 2005, Davitt died unexpectedly in Sligo, Ireland, survived by one son and two daughters.

== Works ==
- Gleann ar Ghleann (1982)
- Bligeard Sráide (1983)
- Selected Poems/Rogha Dánta (1987)
- Freacnairc Mhearcair/The Oomph of Quicksilver (2000)
- Fardoras (2003)
