= Séamus Ó Néill =

Writer from County Down, Northern Ireland

Séamus Ó Néill (1910–1981) was an Irish writer from Clarkhill (Clárchoill), Castlewellan, County Down, Ireland.

He was the son of Mary Small and her husband John O’Neill, a carriage maker; he was one of eight children.

Following a primary degree from Queen's University, Belfast, he did historical research under Eoin MacNeill at University College, Dublin. He went on to study in Germany, before moving to Dundalk to each Irish and English. In 1937, he became professor of history at Carysfort College in Dublin, a post he held for 34 years.

He spent periods as editor of the journals An Iris and Comhar. He wrote a regular column in Inniu during the 1940s and 1950s, as well as contributing articles to Scéala Éireann, Ulster Parade and other publications.

The endpiece from Dánta do pháistí (Poems for Children), entitled "Subh Milis" ("Sweet Jam"), a poem dedicated to his mother (subtitle: "Ceann do Mhama"), is his best-known work, and one of the Irish language texts most frequently referenced in English language media:

Original

Bhí subh mhilis
Ar bhaschrann an dorais
Ach mhuch mé an corraí
Ionam a d'éirigh,
Mar smaoinigh mé ar an lá
Nuair a bheas an bhaschrann glan,
Agus an lámh bheag
Ar iarraidh.

Translation

There was jam
On the doorhandle
But I suppressed the anger
That arose in me,
Because I thought of the day
when the doorhandle would be clean
And the little hand
Gone.

Two of his novels, Tonn Tuile and Máire Nic Artáin, dealt with marital breakdown - the first set during The Emergency and the latter in the religiously divided communities of Belfast during the First World War. Tonn Tuile was translated into English by the author's daughter, Eithne O'Neill, under the title Flood Tide (Cork, Mercier Press, 2026).

== Family ==
He was married to Siobhán Judge; after her death he married Caitlín Ní Chaoimh and they had four children.

== Works ==
- An Sean-Saighdiúir agus scéalta eile (The veteran and other stories), 1945.
- An iris/eagarth (An Iris edited), 1945–1946.
- Colm Cille: drama i gceithre radharcanna (Columcill: a drama in four scenes), 1946.
- Tonn tuile (Tidal Wave), Novel, Sáirséal agus Dill, 1947.
- Dánta Poems, pre-1949;
- Iomramh an Ousel (The Voyage of the Ousel), Poems, pre-1949;
- Buaidh an Ultaigh (The Ulsterman will Win), Drama, pre-1949;
- Díolta Faoina Luach (Below-cost Sales), Drama, pre-1949;
- Ní Chuireann siad Síol (They Sow no Seed), Drama, pre-1949;
- Dánta do pháistí (Poems for Children), 1949.
- Súil timpeall (Eye Around), Essay, 1951.
- Up the Rebels, Oifig an tSoláthair, 1954. Trans. Doiminic Ó Ceallaigh.
- Ag baint fraochán: agus scéalta eile (Picking Blaeberries and other stories), 1955.
- Máire Nic Artáin (Maire McCartan), Novel, Cló Morainn, 1959.
- Iníon Rí Dhún Sobhairce: tragóid trí ghníomh (The King of Dunseverick's Daughter: a tragedy in three acts), 1967.
- Faill ar an bhFeart: dráma trí ghníomh (Opportunity of a Miracle: a drama in three acts), 1967.
- An tSiúr Pól: dráma trí ghníomh (Sister Paul: a drama in three acts), c.1973.
- Rún an Oileáin (The Secret of the Island), pub. c.1975. Staged in the Damer Theatre, Dublin 5–10 June 1961.
- Iníon rí na Spáinne (The King of Spain's Daughter), 1978.

== Critical and bibliographic material ==
- The Oxford Companion to Irish Literature, Welch, R. (ed.), The Clarendon Press, Oxford University, 1996.
- A Biographical Dictionary of Irish Writers, Anne Brady & Brian Cleeve (eds.), The Lilliput Press, 1985.
- Séamus Ó Néill bibliography from James Hardiman Library, UCG
- AINM Ireland Séamus Ó Néill (in Irish)

== See also ==
- List of Irish writers
