= Nuala Ní Dhomhnaill =

Irish poet

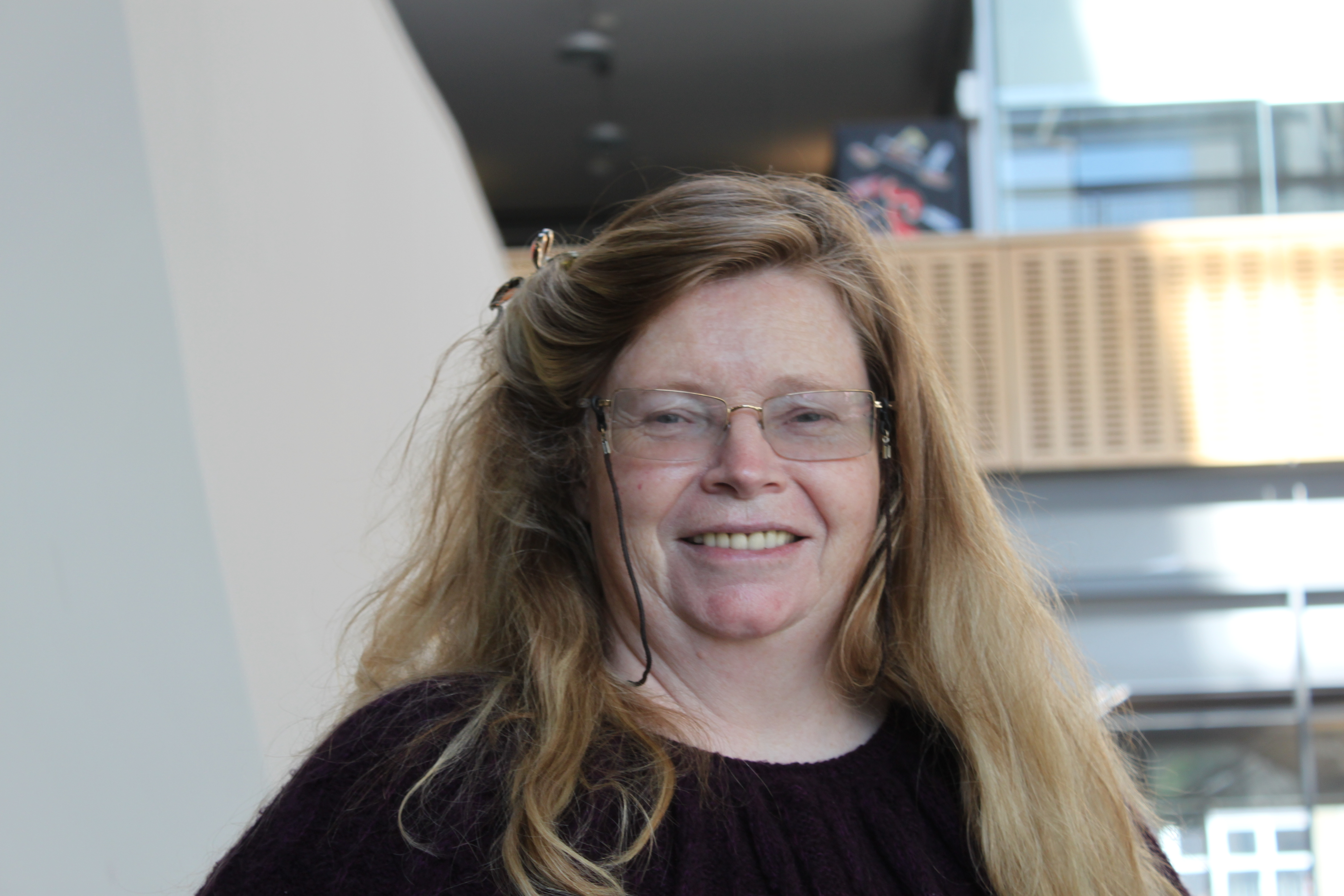
Nuala Ní Dhomhnaill in Belfast in May 2010

Nuala Ní Dhomhnaill (Irish pronunciation: [ˈn̪ˠuəlˠə n̠ʲiː ˈɣoːnˠəl̠ʲ]; born 1952) is a modern Irish poet whose works have been described as having a "major influence in revitalizing the Irish language in modern poetry".

== Biography ==
Born in Lancashire, England, of Irish parents, she moved to Ireland at the age of 5 and was brought up in the Corca Dhuibhne Gaeltacht and in Nenagh, County Tipperary. Her uncle, Monsignor Pádraig Ó Fiannachta of Dingle, was an authority on Munster Irish. Her mother brought her up to speak English, though she was an Irish speaker herself. Her father and his side of the family spoke very fluent Irish and used it every day, but her mother thought it would make life easier for Nuala if she spoke only English instead.

She studied English and Irish at UCC in 1969 and became part of the 'Innti' group of poets. In 1973, she married Turkish geologist Doğan Leflef and lived abroad in Turkey and Holland for seven years.

One year after her return to County Kerry in 1980, she published her first collection of poetry in Irish, An Dealg Droighin (1981); She later became a member of Aosdána. Ní Dhomhnaill has published extensively and her works include poetry collections, children's plays, screenplays, anthologies, articles, reviews and essays. Her other works include Féar Suaithinseach (1984); Feis (1991), and Cead Aighnis (1998). Ni Dhomhnaill's poems appear in English translation in the dual-language editions Rogha Dánta/Selected Poems (1986, 1988, 1990); The Astrakhan Cloak (1992), Pharaoh's Daughter (1990), The Water Horse (2007), and The Fifty Minute Mermaid (2007). Her poem Dubh (ar thitim Shrebenice, 11ú Iúil, 1995), known in English as Black (on the fall of Srebrenica, 11 July 1995) and reflecting her reaction to the 1995 Srebrenica massacre, was translated to English by Paul Muldoon are included in An Leabhar Mòr (2008). Selected Essays appeared in 2005. Her poem, 'Mo Ghrá-Sa (Idir Lúibini)', is part of the Leaving Certificate curriculum for Irish.

She played a minor role as the Irish oral examiner in the 1997 film, How to Cheat in the Leaving Certificate.

She writes poetry exclusively in Irish and is quoted as saying that the "Irish is a language of beauty, historical significance, ancient roots and an immense propensity for poetic expression through its everyday use". Ní Dhomhnaill also speaks English, Turkish, French, German and Dutch fluently.

Ní Dhomhnaill's writings focus on the rich oral tradition and heritage of Ireland and particularly draw upon ancient stories from Irish folklore and Irish mythology, in combination with contemporary themes of feminism, sexuality, and culture. Her mythopoeia poetry expresses an alternative reality and she often speaks about her reasons for both retelling and reimagining myths that are an integral part of Irish literature and Irish culture. Ní Dhomhnaill has stated that "Myth is a basic, fundamental structuring of our reality, a narrative that we place on the chaos of sensation to make sense of our lives".

== Personal life ==
Ní Dhomhnaill's husband died in 2013. She lives near Dublin and is a regular broadcaster on Irish radio and television.

== Awards and honours ==
Ní Dhomhnaill has received many scholarships, prizes, and bursaries. She has also won numerous international awards for works which have been translated into French, German, Polish, Italian, Norwegian, Estonian, Japanese and English. She is one of Ireland's most well-known Irish language writers. She was Ireland Professor of Poetry from 2001 to 2004, and the first Professor of Irish (language) Poetry. Her papers are collected at Boston College's Burns Library. In March 2018, she received the Zbigniew Herbert International Literary Award for her achievements in poetry.

== Publications ==
=== Poetry: main collections ===
- An Dealg Droighin (Cló Mercier, 1981)
- Féar Suaithinseach (Maigh Nuad, 1984)
- Feis (Maigh Nuad, 1991)
- Pharaoh's Daughter (1990)
- The Astrakhan Cloak (1992, Translated by Paul Muldoon)
- Spíonáin is Róiseanna (Cló Iar-Chonnachta, 1993)
- Cead Aighnis (An Sagart, An Daingean, 1998)
- The Water Horse: Poems in Irish (Gallery, 1999, Aistriúcháin le Medbh McGuckian agus Eiléan Ní Chuilleanáin)
- The Fifty Minute Mermaid (Gallery, 2007, translated by Paul Muldoon)
- Northern Lights (Gallery Press, 2018)

=== Poetry: selected editions ===
- Rogha Dánta/Selected Poems (Raven Arts, 1986, Translated by Michael Hartnett)

=== Essay Collections ===
- Selected Essays (New Island, 2005)
- Cead Isteach / Entry Permitted (University College Dublin Press, 2017)

=== Plays ===
- Jimín (Children's drama, Dublin, 1985)
- Na Peirsigh (translation of Aeschylus, Amharclann na Péacóige, Dublin, 2024)
