= Eoghan Ó Tuairisc =

Irish poet and writer (1919-1982)

Eoghan Ó Tuairisc (Eugene Rutherford Watters) (3 April 1919 – 24 August 1982) was an Irish poet and writer.

== Life ==
Eugene Rutherford Watters was born at Dunlo Hill, Ballinasloe, County Galway, to Thomas Watters, a soldier, and his wife, Maud Sproule. His second name came from his grandfather, Rutherford Sproule.

He was educated at Garbally College. His entered St. Patrick's Teacher Training College, Drumcondra in 1939, graduating with a Diploma in Education in 1945. He was awarded an MA, by University College Dublin in 1947.

Ó Tuairisc held a commission in the Irish Army during the Emergency from 1939 to 1945. He was a teacher in Finglas, County Dublin from 1940 to 1969. From 1962 to 1965, he was editor of Feasta, the journal of Conradh na Gaeilge. His first wife, the Irish artist Una McDonnell, died in 1965. The following five years were an unsettled period of limited productivity, changing residence and jobs, and, ultimately, serious depression.

In 1972 he married the writer Rita Kelly, also of Ballinasloe. They lived in the lock house at the Maganey Lock on the Barrow River that Ó Tuairisc had bought near Carlow town. The plaque on the wall erected by his wife states "He was happy here. Lux Aeterna". Kelly survived him on his death in 1982.

== Writing ==
He wrote novels, verse, drama and criticism in both Irish and English. His first major publication was his controversial novel Murder in Three Moves, followed by the Irish-language prose epic L'Attaque, which won an Irish Book Club award. Both works had a strong poetic flavour. His next book was a volume of verse entitled Week-End.

His narrative poem Dermot and Grace, an Irish version of Venus and Adonis, is considered his finest work.

Ó Tuairisc produced little during the five years following McDonnell's death. In 1981 he published The Road to Brightcity: and other stories (Swords: Poolbeg Press, 1981), a translation of nine of the best short stories written originally in Irish by Máirtín Ó Cadhain. Also in 1981, he and Rita Kelly published a joint collection of their poems, Dialann sa Díseart.

Like Diarmaid Ó Súilleabháin, he "challenged the critical orthodoxy by openly proclaiming that their standards could not be those of the Gaeltacht and by demanding a creative freedom that would acknowledge hybridity and reject the strictures of the linguistic purists."

Eoghan Ó Tuairisc was one of the 89 inaugural members of Aosdána, when it was founded in 1981. He died before its first general assembly, the first member to pass away, so there were only 96 members when it first convened, even with 9 further appointees. He was a recipient of an Arts Council of Ireland prize, as well as an Abbey Theatre prize for a Christmas pantomime in Irish. A bibliography of Ó Tuairisc's work, together with biographical information, was published in Irish in 1988.

== Works ==
=== Translations ===
- John Jordan (ed.), "Dialann Deoraí", in: The Pleasures of Gaelic Literature (1977).
- Máirtín Ó Cadhain, The road to Brightcity: and other stories, Swords: Poolbeg Press, 1981.
- Pádraic Ó Conaire, 15 Short Stories, Swords: Poolbeg Press, 1982.

=== Poetry ===
- Dialann sa Díseart, Dublin: Coiscéim, 1981.
- Rogha an Fhile, anthology with translations. 1974.
- New Passages, 1973.
- Dé Luain, Dublin: Allen Figgis 1966.
- The Weekend of Dermot and Grace, Dublin: Allen Figgis & Son, 1964; rep. in "Eugene Watters Special Issue" Poetry Ireland Review 13 (1985)@.
- Lux Aeterna, including Hiroshima Mass, Dublin: Allen Figgis, 1964.

=== Plays ===
- Fornocht do Chonac, first performed 1979; Dublin: Foilseacháin an Rialtais, 1981.
- Lá Fhéile Michíl, first performed 1963; Dublin: Clodhanna Teo., 1967.
- Song of the Nightingale, written together with Sandra Warde, 1971.

=== Essays ===
- Religio Poetae agus Aistí Eile, ed. Maírín Nic Eoin, Baile Átha Cliath: An Clóchomhar, 1987.
- Focus, (with Desmond Egan), 1972.

=== Books ===
- An Lomnochtán. Autobiography, Dublin & Cork: Mercier, 1978.
- [The Story of a] Hedgeschool Master, 1975.
- L'Attaque, Dublin: Allen Figgis, 1962 (novel in Irish).
- Murder in Three Moves, 1960.

=== Other activities ===
- "Christian names", in Encyclopaedia of Ireland, Dublin: Figgis 1968, pp. 119–21.
- "Infinite Variety – Dan Lowrey's Music Hall 1879–97" (Eugene Watters & Matthew Murtagh) Gill & Macmillan, 1975.
