= Coiscéim =

Irish-language publisher

- Formation: 1980
- Founder: Pádraig Ó Snodaigh
- Type: Irish language Irish culture Gaelic revival
- Headquarters: Dublin, Ireland
- Website: coisceim.ie

Coiscéim (Irish pronunciation: [ˈkɔʃceːmʲ]; "Footstep") is a prolific Dublin-based Irish-language publisher founded by writer, historian and language activist Pádraig Ó Snodaigh in 1980. With over 1,500 titles Coiscéim have published the largest number of titles amongst the 26 other Irish language publishers.

== History ==
Well-known authors who have published with Coiscéim include Gabriel Rosenstock, Alan Titley, Michael Davitt, Michael Hartnett, Biddy Jenkinson, Tomás Mac Síomóin, Colm Breathnach, Tomás Ó Canainn, Joe Steve Ó Neachtain, Maidhc Dainín Ó Sé, Diarmuid Ó Gráinne, Derry O'Sullivan and Pádraig Ó Siadhail.

Micheál Ó Ruairc's Coiscéim-published poem "Na hÉin agus Naomh Caoimhín" won first prize in the 2009 Dún Laoghaire-Rathdown poetry festival.

Tomás Mac Síomóin's Coiscéim-published novel An Tionscadal won first prize at the Oireachtas na Gaeilge literary and cultural festival in 2006.

Paddy Bushe's Coiscéim-published book Gile na Gile won the Michael Hartnett Poetry Prize in 2006.

== See also ==
- Cló Iar-Chonnacht
- Gael Linn
- An Ceathrú Póilí
