= Dán Díreach =

Poetic style in Ireland (12th to 17th centuries)

Dán Díreach (pronounced [ˌd̪ˠaːn̪ˠ ˈdʲiːɾʲəx]; Irish for "direct verse") is a style of poetry developed in Ireland from the 12th century until the destruction of the Irish clan system, Gaelic Ireland and the Bardic schools during the mid 17th-century. It was a complex form of recitative designed to be chanted to the accompaniment of a harp. This poetry was often delivered by a professional reciter called a reacaire (reciter) or marcach duaine (poem rider). It was the specialised production of the professional poets known as Filidh (Seer). The complexities of the structure become more understandable when we consider that Irish poetry evolved primarily as an orally transmitted art. They were not intended to be read, but recited in public. Form, structure, rhythm and rhyme, intonation, and expression all play an essential part of the performance of poets. The aim was to amaze an audience with vocal virtuosity, knowledge, and spiritual depth. In this they must have succeeded as the Filidh came to be viewed with a sense of awe, respect and fear.

The formal production of Dán Direach by trained poets came to an end with the destruction of Irish Gaelic society due to the Plantations of Ireland in the 17th century. However, the forms continued in folk memory as chants, prayers and informally delivered lays that continued to be recited in Gaelic speaking areas of Ireland and Scotland into the early 20th century. Gaelic poetical culture may have continued to influence Caribbean and African American forms of singing in the 17th and 18th century when the language was spoken by immigrants in the Caribbean and American south.

Many hundreds of poems are still extant as they were collected into poem books called Duanaire by wealthy patrons.

== History ==
Rhyme has an old history of sophisticated development in Ireland. It was not a feature of Classical Greek or Latin verse. There is some reason to believe that Ireland brought developed forms of rhyme into other European cultures through the influence of the literate monks and foundations created by them across northern Europe. The development of Dán Direach seems to coincide with the rise of the secular schools in the 12th century. Families that had their roots in the great monastic literary tradition appear to have continued the learned tradition outside the strictly religious environment of the monasteries after the reform of the Irish church in the 12th century. The Ó Dálaigh family of bards were considered to be the foremost exponents of Dán Direach throughout the later Medieval period.

== Performance ==
An eyewitness account states:

"The Action and Pronunciation of the Poems, in the Presence of the Maecenas (Chief), or the principal Person it related to, was perform'd with a great deal of Ceremony, in a Consort of Vocal and Instrumental Musick. The poet himself said nothing, but directed and took care that every body else did his Part right. The Bards having first had the Composition from him, got it well by Heart, and now pronounc'd it orderly, keeping even Pace with a Harp, touch'd upon that Occasion; no other musical Instrument being allow'd of for the said Purpose than this alone, as being Masculin, much sweeter, and fuller than any other."

== Training ==
The training took place in schools under an Ollamh and was long and arduous. Poems were created in the dark while lying down. Traditional payment was in gold rings, horses, land or apparel.

=== Types ===
Other notable styles practiced may have been the caoineadh or death lament and the fonn or mantra of repetition.

Aer refers to poetical satire, a form used against the powerful. As satirists poets had the power to destroy the reputation of even the highest nobility. Some satires were reputed to bring disease and blemish to the accused, others humiliation.

== Technical Terms ==
Irish contains many terms for types of rhyme and rhythms used in the delivery of dán direach.

A poem consisted of quatrains called rann (division). The quatrain is divided into two parts called leathrann (half verse/couplet). A single line is called ceathramhain. Whatever sound, syllable or line a poem begins with, it must end on the same. This is called dúnadh (closing).

Consonants were divided into hard, soft, light, rough, and strong groups. Strong consonants rhymed with light for example. Vowels were grouped into broad and slender. The broad vowels are a, o, u, á, ó, & ú. The slender vowels are e, i, é & í. Consonants were classed as broad or slender depending on what vowels preceded them.

Comhardadh means literally correspondence or equality, and approximates to rhyme in English but has a wider meaning. Comhardadh slán means 'perfect rhyme' and comhardadh briste means 'broken rhyme'. Comhardadh could be final, internal, or aicill. Aicill technique rhymes the final stressed word of one line with the next-to-last unstressed word in the next line. The final rhyming word is called rinn, 'tip' and the unstressed rhyming word airdrinn, 'attention-tip'. A word can also rhyme with two words instead of just one.

The standard forms of rhyme were recognised. Amus meant vowel rhyming or assonance, in which the vowels are repeated, uaithne consonant rhyming or consonance, in which the consonants are the same, uaim alliteration, or the repetition of initial consonants.

Comhardadh occurs only when the first syllable of each word had the same vowel and consonants of the same class and broadness/slenderness.

The terminology extends to the number of syllables in a word.

- dialt - a single syllable, or a monosyllabic word
- recomhrac - 2 syllable word
- iarcomhrac - 3 syllable word
- felis - 4 syllable word
- cloenre - 5 syllable word
- luibenchossac - 6 syllable word
- claidemnas - 7 syllable word
- bricht - 8 syllable word

== Example ==
An domhan ó mhuir go muir

Ar son gur chuir fa chomhthaibh -

Créad acht cás bróin do bhrosdadh? -

Ar bhás níor fhóir Alasdar.

== See also ==
- Amra Coluim Chille, poetry composed by Dallán Forgaill.

== Sources ==
- Rigby, S.H., (2003) A Companion to Britain in the Later Middle Ages, Historical Association, Blackwell Publishing, ISBN 0-631-21785-1
