= Seán Ó Ríordáin =

20th century Irish language poet

- Seán Pádraig Ó Ríordáin
- Born: 3 December 1916; Baile Mhúirne, County Cork, Ireland
- Died: 21 February 1977 (aged 60); Glanmire, County Cork, Ireland
- Occupations: Poet, writer
- Writing career
- Language: Irish
- Notable work: Eireaball Spideoige
- Literary movement: Modernism

Seán Pádraig Ó Ríordáin (3 December 1916 – 21 February 1977), sometimes referred to as an Ríordánach, was an Irish language poet and later a newspaper columnist. He is credited with introducing European themes to Irish poetry, and is widely regarded as one of the best Irish language poets of the 20th century.

== Biography ==
=== Early life ===
Ó Ríordáin was the eldest of three children born in Baile Mhúirne, County Cork, to Seán Ó Ríordáin and Máiréad Ní Loineacháin.

English was his first language. His mother spoke English; his father spoke Irish and English. His father's mother, a native Irish speaker, lived next door. His next-door neighbour on the other side also spoke Irish, something Ó Ríordáin attributed to contributing to his own acquisition of Irish. It wasn't long before Ó Ríordáin gained some knowledge of Irish.

When Ó Ríordáin was ten, his father died of tuberculosis. Five years later, in 1932, the family moved to Inniscarra, on the outskirts of Cork city. After settling there, Seán and his brother Tadhg were sent to school in the North Monastery Christian Brothers School, on the northside of Cork city.

=== Professional career ===
Ó Ríordáin worked as a clerk in the Cork Motor Tax Office from 1936 until his early retirement due to health issues in 1965. In 1967, Ó Ríordáin was made a part-time lecturer in University College Cork. Between 1969 and 1976. Ó Ríordáin was UCC's writer in residence. Concurrent with his time in UCC, he wrote a weekly column in The Irish Times, which he continued until 1975.

=== Health issues ===
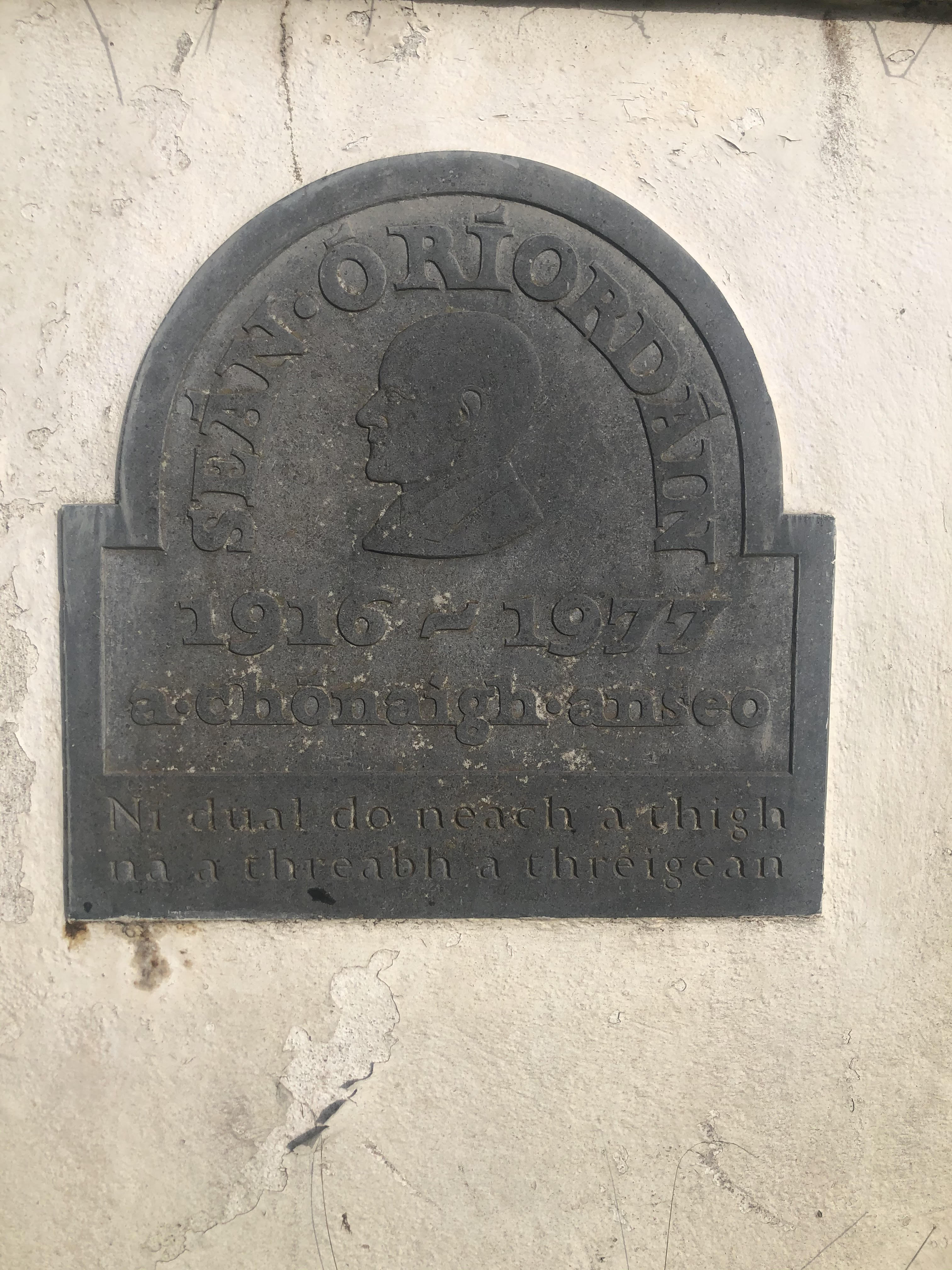
A plaque in Inniscarra, County Cork commemorating the house in which Ó Ríordáin lived the majority of his adult life. Below is a line from his poem Fill Arís, which roughly translates as "It is not natural for anyone to abandon his house or his tribe".

Ó Ríordáin contracted pneumonia at the age of thirteen, and was afterwards ill for most of his life. He was diagnosed with tuberculosis in 1938, and made frequent visits to sanatoria throughout his life thereafter. Ó Ríordáin never married, and died in Sarsfield Court Hospital in 1977. He is interred in St. Gobnait's cemetery, Baile Mhúirne, alongside his father and paternal grandparents.

== Poetic works ==
=== Eireaball Spideoige ===
Eireaball Spideoige (A Robin's Tail) is Ó Ríordáin's first and largest collection of poetry, published in 1952. It was published by Sáirséal agus Dill who would serve as publishers for all of his later works as well. Eireaball Spideoige contains Ó Ríordáin's best known poem, Adhlacadh mo Mháthar (My Mother's Burial), from which the collection's title is derived. Adhlacadh mo Mháthair is an intimate exploration of Ó Ríordáin's grief following the death of his mother. According to scholar Louis de Paor, this poem created a new frisson in Irish language poetry when this poem was first published in 1945. In the introduction to Eireaball Spideoige Ó Ríordáin describes his poetry as an attempt to capture "the immediacy of the moment". In the preface he asks "What is poetry?", and answers "A child's mind."

Though now regarded as an integral part of the Irish literary canon, Eireaball Spideoige received mixed reviews on publication in 1952, being criticized for its deviation from traditional Irish poetry in terms of subject matter and personal use of language.

=== Other works ===
Three booklets of Ó Ríordáin's poetry were subsequently published: Brosna (Kindling) in 1964, Línte Liombó (Limbo Lines) in 1971, and the posthumous Tar éis mo Bháis (After my Death) in 1978. His later works are marked by a notable dropping of the sentimentality and romanticism of his first collection. In Brosna Ó Ríordáin examines his difficult relationship with the Irish language, and in Línte Liombó he details the conquering of the individual by dispassionate destiny. His collected poems were released in 2011, under the title Na Dánta.

== Interpretation ==
Ó Ríordáin delineates his personal aesthetic and theology in the preface to his first collection of poetry, Eireaball Spideoige, in which he highlights the relationship between artistic expression, poetry in particular, and being. He argues that poetry is to be under the aspect of another and without that relationship one can only ever produce a prosaic narrative. In that same preface, Ó Ríordáin considers an appropriation of an infant's mind as a prerequisite for the poetic act. The poem An Peaca (The Sin) reveals that Ó Ríordáin's ability to write poetry is at once lost if his immediate relation to nature is interrupted.

According to Gearóid Denvir, Ó Ríordáin's poems "seek to answer fundamental questions about the nature of human existence and the place of the individual in a universe without meaning".

Ó Ríordáin has been described as a European poet. The clash between traditional Irish and contemporary European influences was one of the most consistent conflicts in his work. As with all 'modernisers' of tradition, Ó Ríordáin received considerable opprobrium from traditionalists, most notably Máire Mhac an tSaoi. These attacks, particularly by Mhac an tSaoi on the standard of his Irish, did considerable damage to Seán's confidence and added to his already ill health. He never forgave Mhac an tSaoi. In a 1970 'Writer in Profile' television interview with Ó Ríordáin, Mhac an tSaoi phoned the station to say that she 'had never heard better Irish spoken than that by Seán Ó Ríordáin tonight'. Ó Ríordáin's response, as recorded by his biographer Seán Ó Coileáin: 'my bowels moved in disdain'.

As well as writing poetry, he wrote a column in The Irish Times during the latter years of his life in which he spoke vehemently about national affairs. A number of his poems have appeared in English translation, for example, Modern Irish Poetry: An Anthology (ed. Patrick Crotty).

Along with Mhac an tSaoi and Máirtín Ó Direáin, Ó Ríordáin is considered part of "an triúr mór".

== Popular Poems ==
Ó Ríordáin's poems have enjoyed constant popularity, due in part to the exposure gained by the inclusion of his work in the standard Irish curriculum. Poems such as "Fill Arís", "Cúl an Tí" and "Tost" are widely known, and "Fill Arís" was short-listed in a competition run by RTÉ in 2015 which sought to identify "Ireland's best loved poem". "Toil" is a contemplation on the limitations of human will.

"Cúl an Tí" in particular is often taught in Gaelscoileanna throughout Ireland.

== Legacy ==
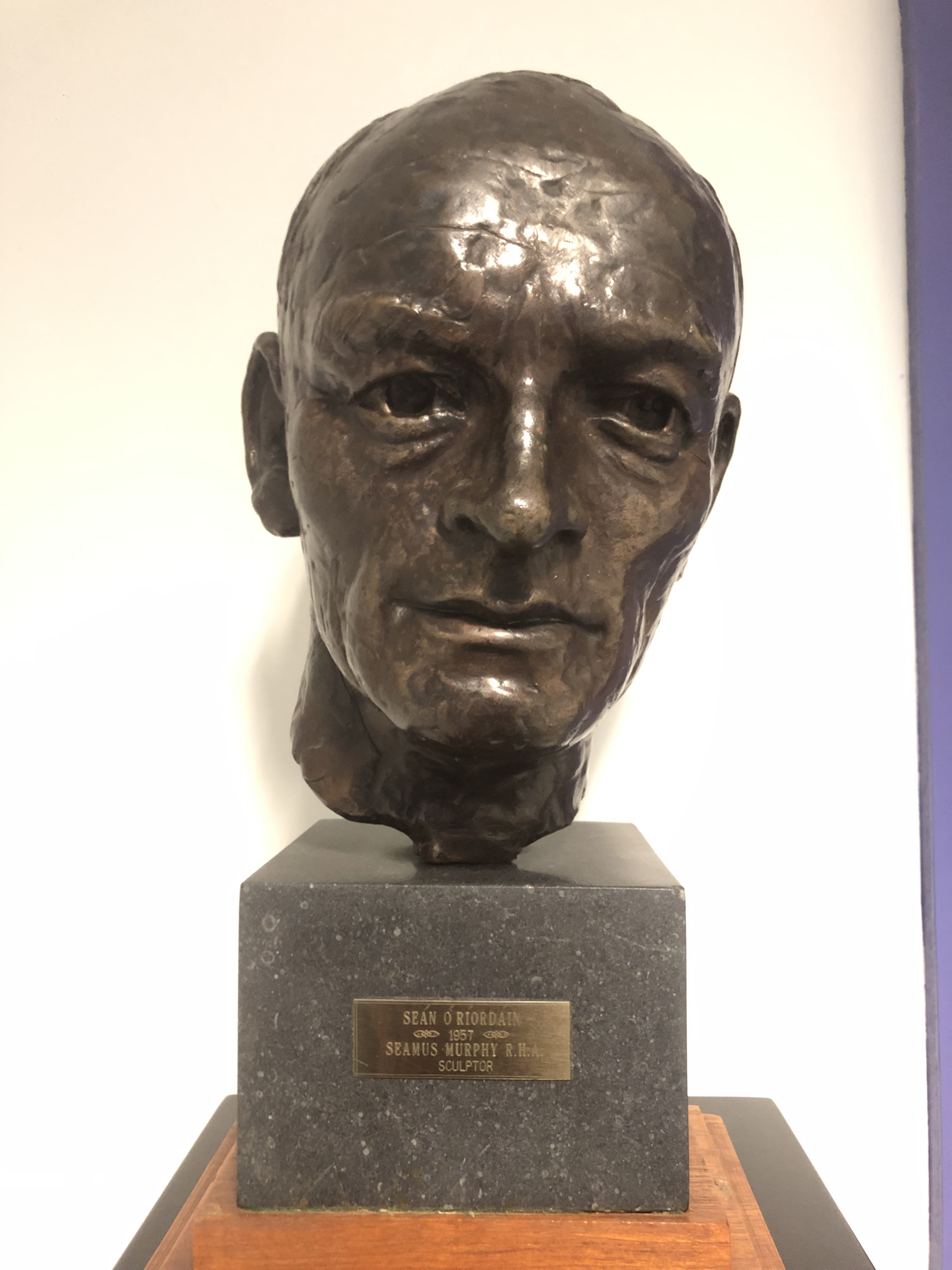
A bust of Ó Ríordáin in University College Cork.

The writings of Ó Ríordáin were a "seminal influence" on the Innti poetry movement.

Gaelscoil Uí Ríordáin, an Irish-language primary school in Ballincollig, County Cork, is named after Ó Ríordáin.
