= Irish language outside Ireland =

The Irish language originated in Ireland and was historically the dominant language of the Irish people. Since the Early Middle Ages, it spread to a number of other countries; in Scotland and on the Isle of Man it gave rise to Scottish Gaelic and Manx, respectively. Irish was the language that a large number of emigrants took with them from the 17th century (when large-scale emigration, forced or otherwise, became noticeable) to the 19th century, when emigration reached new levels.

By the 19th century, English became dominant in Ireland, but Irish speakers had already shown their ability to deal with modern political and social changes through their own language at a time when emigration was strongest.

The Irish diaspora mainly settled in English-speaking countries, chiefly Britain and North America (US and Canada). In some instances the Irish language was retained for several generations. Argentina was the only non-English-speaking country to which the Irish went in large numbers, and those emigrants came in the 19th century from areas where Irish was already in retreat.

An interest in the language has persisted among a minority in the diaspora countries, and even in countries where there was never a significant Irish presence. This has been shown in the founding of language classes (including some at tertiary level), in the use of the Internet, and in contributions to journalism and literature.

== Britain ==
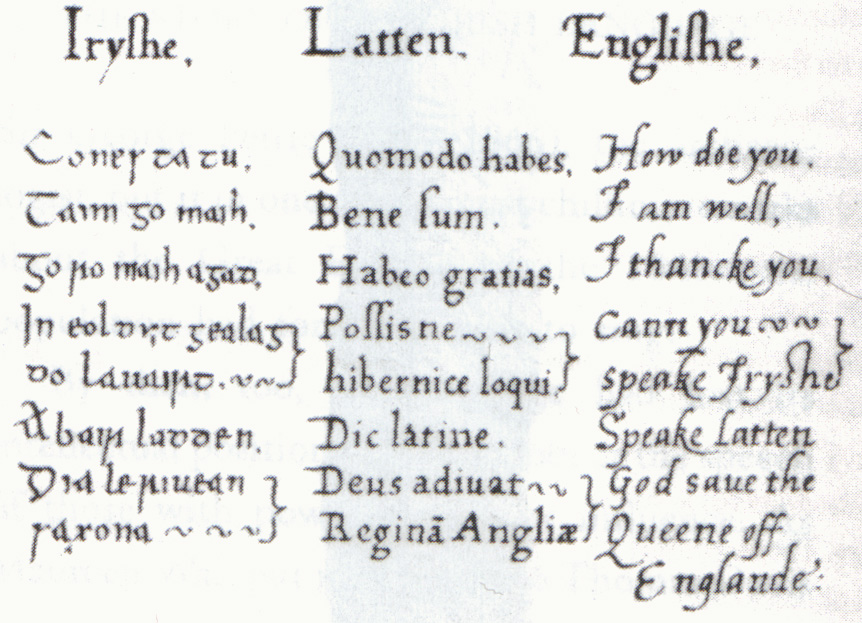
Multilingual phrase book in Irish, Latin and English compiled for Elizabeth I of England by Christopher, Baron Delvin.

Irish speakers of all social classes were to be found in early modern Britain. Irish beggars were common in 16th century England, and from the late 16th century many unskilled Irish labourers settled in Liverpool, Bristol and London. Aristocratic Irish speakers included the Nugent brothers, members of Ireland's "Old English" community: Christopher Nugent, 6th Baron Delvin, who wrote an Irish-language primer for Elizabeth I, and William Nugent, an Irish language poet who is known to have been at Oxford in 1571. Shakespeare's plays contain one line in Irish, "Caleno custore me" in Act IV Scene 4 of Henry V. This was the title of a traditional song in Irish, Is Cailín ó Chois tSiúre mé ("I'm a young girl from the bank of the Suir").

Irish speakers were among the troops brought over from Ireland during the English Civil War. Language and cultural differences were partly responsible for the great hostility they encountered in England. Among them were troops commanded by Murrough O'Brien, 1st Earl of Inchiquin and who followed him when he later sided with Parliament.

Large-scale Irish immigration, including many Irish speakers, began with the building of canals from the 1780s and of railways in the nineteenth century. More Irish settled in industrial towns in Lancashire in the late eighteenth century than in any other county. Many Irish were attracted to Birmingham in the mid-1820s by rapid industrial expansion. The city had large households of Irish speakers, often from the same parts of counties Mayo, Roscommon, Galway and Sligo. In Manchester a sixth of the family heads were Irish by 1835. By the 1830s Irish speakers were to be found in Manchester, Glasgow and the larger towns of South Wales. Friedrich Engels heard Irish being spoken in the most crowded areas of Manchester in 1842. Irish speakers from counties Roscommon, Galway and Mayo were also to be found in Stafford from the 1830s.

The Great Famine of the later 1840s brought an influx of Irish speakers to England, Wales and Scotland. Many arrived from such counties as Mayo, Cork, Waterford and Limerick to Liverpool, Bristol, and the towns of South Wales and Lancashire, and often moved on to London. Navvies found work on the South Wales Railway. There are reports of Irish-speaking communities in some quarters of Liverpool in the Famine years (1845–52). Irish speakers from Munster were common among London immigrants, with many women speaking little or no English. Around 100,000 Irish had arrived in London by 1851. The Irish Nationalist politician and lawyer A.M. Sullivan described an 1856 visit to the industrial "Black Country" of the West Midlands where "in very many of the houses not one of the women could speak English, and I doubt that in a single house the Irish was not the prevalent language".

The Gaelic Revival in Ireland at the turn of the 20th century led to formation of branches of the Gaelic League abroad, including British cities. There were three branches of the Gaelic League in Glasgow by 1902 and a branch was also founded in Manchester.

In the aftermath of the Second World War there were a large number of Irish working in Britain as construction workers, rebuilding destroyed cities, and as nurses. Many of them, both in provincial towns and in London, were from the Gaeltachtaí, and Irish was commonly heard on building sites, in Irish pubs, and in dance halls.

While rebuilding the bombed damaged cities of postwar Britain, Dónall Mac Amhlaigh, a native of Barna, Connemara, kept an Irish-language diary, which he published as, Dialann Deoraí. It was translated into English by Valentine Iremonger and published in 1964 under the title An Irish Navvy: The Diary of an Exile.

The Irish language scene in Great Britain is equally important due to their influence upon Brian Stowell, one of the driving forces behind the ongoing Manx Gaelic language and literary revival. While living in Liverpool, Stowell attended Irish language classes arranged by Conradh na Gaeilge, as he felt that they were "the next best thing to Manx." Stowell ultimately became fluent in Irish and taught classes in the language in Liverpool, although not without difficulty during the Troubles:

And when the troubles came in Northern Ireland it was a bit difficult because people threatened the office in Liverpool about the class in Irish and it was....well they had to laugh in the end because I said, 'Change the name to Celtic Studies,' and they did that and they made other threats because they thought that was the football club Celtic in Glasgow.

Stowell eventually used his experience learning and teaching Irish to translate the Irish language course Buntús Cainte into Manx, which became Bunneydys for the Manx language learning community.

=== London ===
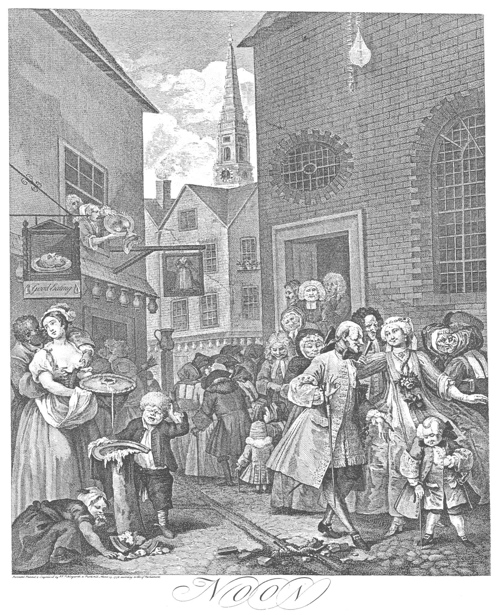
St Giles in the Fields in the 1730s, as depicted by William Hogarth

Irish immigrants were a notable element of London life from the early seventeenth century. They engaged in seasonal labour and street selling, and became common around St Giles in the Fields during the eighteenth century, being prominent among the London poor. Many of them were discharged soldiers. The Old Bailey trial records give a glimpse of the use of Irish in London backstreets, including an instance where a court interpreter was required (1768).

The first Irish colony was in St Giles in the Fields and Seven Dials. By the early nineteenth century Irish communities existed in Whitechapel, Saffron Hill, Poplar and Southwark, and especially in Marylebone. Typical occupations were hawking and costermongering. Henry Mayhew estimated in the 1850s that around 10,000 Irish men and women were so employed. The writer and linguist George Borrow gives an account (1851) of his father venturing into the Irish-speaking slums of London in the early years of the nineteenth century.

The use of the language was affected by a decline in the number of immigrants. By the middle of the nineteenth century the Irish-born numbered around 109,000 individuals (4.5% of Londoners). By 1861 their number had fallen to 107,000, in 1871 to 91,000, and in 1901 to 60,000.

Among the Irish-speaking community in Victorian era London was the prolific poet Tomás 'an tSneachta' Ó Conchubair (born 1798 in County Cork), whose literary translation of Book I of John Milton's Paradise Lost into Modern Irish was made c.1860. After long being believed to have been lost, the original manuscript was located at the Rare Book and Manuscript Collection of the University of Illinois in 2024.

The Gaelic League was active in London as elsewhere. The London branch, which included Art Ó Briain among its members, was involved in the publication of Irish-language material.

=== Irish language in contemporary Britain ===
In response to the 2021 UK census, 736 respondents in England and Wales indicated that Irish was the "main language" of the household.

The Gaelic League retains a presence in Britain, with branches in Glasgow (first founded in 1895) and in England. The Irish-language school, Coláiste na nGael (founded in 2000) runs language classes and also "promotes and encourages the use of Irish in England". There is also an Irish language scene in Manchester and a local group, the Manchester Irish Language Group, is involved in organising classes, events and festivals. The British Association for Irish Studies (established 1985) aims to support Irish cultural activities, the study of Ireland in Britain and promotion of the Irish language.

== North America ==
Irish people brought the language with them to North America as early as the 17th century (when it is first mentioned). In the 18th century it had many speakers in Pennsylvania. Immigration from Irish-speaking counties to America was strong throughout the 19th century, particularly after the Great Famine of 1840s, and many manuscripts in Irish came with the immigrants.

The Irish language in Newfoundland was introduced in the late 17th century and was widely spoken there until the early 20th century. Local place names in the Irish language include Newfoundland (Talamh an Éisc, Land of the Fish) and St. John's (Baile Sheáin) Ballyhack (Baile Hac), Cappahayden (Ceapach Éidín), Kilbride and St. Bride's (Cill Bhríde), Duntara, Port Kirwan and Skibbereen (Scibirín).

In the oral tradition of County Waterford, the poet Donnchadh Ruadh Mac Conmara, a hedge school teacher and notorious rake from the district of Sliabh gCua, is said to have sailed for Newfoundland around 1743, allegedly to escape the wrath of a man whose daughter the poet had impregnated.

For a long time, it was doubted whether the poet ever made the trip. During the 21st century, however, linguists discovered that several of Donnchadh Ruadh's poems in the Irish language Gaelicize many words and terms known to be unique to Newfoundland English. For this reason, Donnchadh Ruadh's poems are considered the earliest solid evidence of the Irish language in Newfoundland.

In Philadelphia, County Galway-born lexicographer Maitias Ó Conbhuí spent thirty years attempting to compile a dictionary of the Irish language, which remained unfinished upon his death in 1842.

The Irish language poet and monoglot speaker Pádraig Phiarais Cúndún (1777–1856), a native of Ballymacoda, County Cork, emigrated to America around 1826 and settled with his family on a homestead near Deerfield, New York. There were many other Irish-speakers in and around Deerfield and Cúndún never had to learn English. He died in Deerfield in 1857 and lies buried at St. Agnes Cemetery in Utica, New York. Cúndún's many works of American poetry composed in Munster Irish have survived through the letters he wrote to his relatives and former neighbors in Ballymacoda and due to the fact that his son, "Mr. Pierce Condon of South Brooklyn", arranged for two of his father's poems to be published by the Irish-American in 1858. The first collection of Cúndún's poetry was edited by Risteard Ó Foghludha and published in 1932. Kenneth E. Nilsen, an American linguist who specialized in Celtic languages in North America, referred to Cúndún as, "the most notable Irish monoglot speaker to arrive in this country", and added that, "his letters and poems, written in upstate New York to his neighbours in Ballymacoda, County Cork, represent the most important body of Pre-Famine writing in Irish from the United States".

In 1851, the Irish-American, a weekly newspaper published in New York City, published what is believed to be, "the first original composition in Irish to be published in the United States". It was a three stanza poem describing an Irish pub on Duane Street in what is now the Tribeca neighborhood of Lower Manhattan. The poem's style is that of the Irish-language poetry of the 18th and early 19th centuries, the only difference is that it describes a pub located in the Irish diaspora.

In 1857, the Irish-American added a regular column in the Irish-language. The first five original poems which were published in the column were submitted by Irish poets living in present-day Ontario.

During the 1860s in South Boston, Massachusetts, Bríd Ní Mháille, an immigrant from the village of Trá Bhán, on the island of Garmna, County Galway, composed the Irish-language caoineadh Amhrán na Trá Báine, which is about the drowning of her three brothers, whose currach was rammed and sunk while they were out at sea. Ní Mháille's lament for her brothers was first performed at a ceilidh in South Boston before being brought back to her native district in Connemara, where it is considered one of the amhráin mhóra ("Big Songs") and it remains a very popular song among performers and fans of Irish traditional music.

Beginning in the 1870s, the more politicized Irish-Americans began taking interest in their ancestral language. Gaelic revival organizations like the Philo-Celtic Society began springing up throughout the United States. Irish-American newspapers and magazines also began adding columns in the Irish-language. These same publications circulated widely among Irish-Canadians. Furthermore, the sixth President of St. Bonaventure's College in St John's, Newfoundland was not only a member of the Society for the Preservation of the Irish Language, but also taught Irish-language classes there during the 1870s. Although the subject still remains to be explored, Kenneth E. Nilsen argued in a posthumously published essay that "closer inspection would likely reveal a Canadian counterpart to the American language revival movement."

In 1881, "An Gaodhal", the first newspaper anywhere which was largely in Irish, was founded as part of the Gaelic revival by Mícheál Ó Lócháin and the Philo-Celtic Society chapter in Brooklyn, New York. It continued appearing until 1904 and its published contributions included many works of Irish folklore collected in both Ireland and the United States. According to Tomás Ó hÍde, however, old issues of An Gaodhal, while a priceless resource, are very difficult for modern readers of Irish to understand due to the publishers' use of Gaelic type and an obsolete orthography.An Gaodhal, however, now has an on-line successor in An Gael, which is edited by American-born Irish-language essayist and poet Séamas Ó Neachtain.

Many other Irish immigrant newspapers in the English language in the 19th and 20th century similarly added Irish language columns.

The Philo-Celtic Society chapter in Boston published the bilingual newspaper, The Irish Echo, from 1886 to 1894. Every issue bore an Edmund Burke quote as the tagline, "No people will look forward to posterity who do not look backward to their ancestors." Every issue contained many works of Irish language literature and poetry submitted by Irish-Americans in and around Boston. Some were composed locally, but many others were transcribed and submitted from centuries-old heirloom Irish-language manuscripts which had been brought to the Boston area by recent immigrants.

Also during the Gaelic revival, a regular Irish-language column titled Ón dhomhan diar, generally about the hardships faced by immigrants to the United States, was contributed to Patrick Pearse's An Claidheamh Soluis by Pádraig Ó hÉigeartaigh (1871–1936). Ó hÉigeartaigh, an immigrant from Uíbh Ráthach, County Kerry, worked in the clothing business and lived with his family in Springfield, Massachusetts. Ó hÉigeartaigh also wrote poetry for the same publication in Munster Irish. His poem Ochón! a Dhonncha ("My Sorrow, Dhonncha!"), a lament for the drowning of his six-year-old son on 22 August 1905, appeared in Pearse's magazine in 1906. Although the early authors of the Gaelic revival preferred to write in the literary language once common to both Ireland and Scotland and felt scorn for the oral poetry of the Gaeltachtaí, Ó hÉigeartaigh drew upon that very tradition to express his grief and proved that it could still be used effectively by a 20th-century poet. Ó hÉigeartaigh's lament for his son has a permanent place in the literary canon of Irish poetry in the Irish language and has been translated into English by both Patrick Pearse and Thomas Kinsella.

One of the most talented 20th-century Irish-language poets and folklore collectors in the New World was Seán Gaelach Ó Súilleabháin (Sean "Irish" O'Sullivan) (1882–1957). Ó Súilleabháin, whom literary scholar Ciara Ryan has dubbed "Butte's Irish Bard", was born into the Irish-speaking fishing community upon Inishfarnard, a now-uninhabited island off the Beara Peninsula in West County Cork. In 1905, Ó Súilleabháin sailed aboard the ocean liner RMS Lucania from Queenstown to Ellis Island and settled in the heavily Irish-American mining community in Butte, Montana. Following his arrival in America, Ó Súilleabháin never returned to Ireland. In the State of Montana, however, he learned through classes taught by the Butte chapter of Conradh na Gaeilge to read and write in his native language for the first time. Ó Súilleabháin also married and raised a family. Seán Ó Súilleabháin remained a very influential figure in Butte's Irish-American literary, Irish republican, and Pro-Fianna Fáil circles for the rest of his life.

In the O'Sullivan Collection in the Butte-Silver Bow Archives, Ó Súilleabháin is also revealed to have transcribed many folksongs and oral poetry from his childhood memories of Inishfarnard and the Beara Peninsula. Seán Gaelach Ó Súilleabháin was also a highly talented poet in his own right who drew inspiration from Diarmuid na Bolgaí Ó Sé (c.1755–1846), Máire Bhuidhe Ní Laoghaire (1774-c.1848), and Pádraig Phiarais Cúndún (1777–1857), who had previously adapted the tradition of Aisling, or "Vision poetry", from the Jacobite Risings of the 18th century to more recent struggles by the Irish people. For this reason, Ó Súilleabháin's surviving Aisling poems; such as Cois na Tuinne ("Beside the Wave"), Bánta Mín Éirinn Glas Óg ("The Lush Green Plains of Ireland"), and the highly popular 1919 poem Dáil Éireann; adapted the same tradition to the events of the Easter Rising of 1916 and the Irish War of Independence (1919–1921).

According to Ó Súilleabháin scholar Ciara Ryan, "Like many aislingí of the eighteenth century, Seán's work is replete with historical and literary reference to Irish and Classical literary characters".

According to the poet's son, Fr. John Patrick Sarsfield O'Sullivan ("Fr. Sars") of the Roman Catholic Diocese of Helena, his father read the Aisling poem Dáil Éireann aloud during Éamon de Valera's 1919 visit to Butte. The future Taoiseach of the Irish Republic was reportedly so impressed that he urged Ó Súilleabháin to submit the poem to Féile Craobh Uí Gramnaigh ("O'Growney's Irish Language Competition") in San Francisco. Ó Súilleabháin took de Valera's advice and won both first prize and the gold medal for the poem.

Seán Gaelach Ó Súilleabháin's papers in the Butte-Silver Bow Archives also include many transcriptions of the verse of other local Irish-language poets. One example is the poem Amhrán na Mianach ("The Song of the Mining"), which, "lays bare the hardships of a miner's life", was composed in Butte by Séamus Feiritéar (1897–1919), his brother Mícheál, and their childhood friend Seán Ruiséal. Another local Irish-language poem transcribed in Ó Súilleabháin's papers was composed in 1910 by Séamus Ó Muircheartaigh, a Butte mine worker from Corca Dhuibhne, County Kerry, who was nicknamed An Spailpín ("The Farmhand"). The poem, which has eight stanzas and is titled, Beir mo Bheannacht leat, a Nellie ("Bring My Blessings with You, Nellie") recalls the poet's happy childhood in Corca Dhuibhne and was composed while Ó Muircheartaigh's wife, Nellie, and their son, Oisín, were on an extended visit there.

At the end of his life, Micí Mac Gabhann (1865–1948), a native Irish-speaker from Cloughaneely, County Donegal, dictated his life experiences in Scotland, the Wild West, Alaska, and the Yukon to his folklorist son-in-law, Seán Ó hEochaidh, who published the posthumously in the 1958 emigration memoir, Rotha Mór an tSaoil ("The Great Wheel of Life"). An English translation by Valentine Iremonger appeared in 1962 as, The Hard Road to Klondike.

The title of the English version refers to the Klondike gold rush, Ruathar an Óir, at the end of the 19th century, and the hardships Irish-speakers endured working in the mines of Tír an Airgid ("The Land of Silver", or Montana) and Tír an Óir ("The Land of Gold", or the Yukon). After making a fortune mining gold from his claim in the Yukon, Mac Gabhann returned to Cloughaneely, married, and bought the estate of a penniless Anglo-Irish landlord, and raised a family there.

Irish retains some cultural importance in the northeast United States. According to the 2000 Census, 25,661 people in the U.S. spoke Irish in the home. The 2005 Census reported 18,815. The 2009-13 American Community Survey reported 20,590 speakers

Furthermore, the tradition of Irish language literature and journalism in American newspapers continued with the weekly column of Barra Ó Donnabháin in New York City's Irish Echo.

Derry-born Pádraig Ó Siadhail (b. 1968) has been living in Halifax, Nova Scotia, since 1987. In this period, he has published ten works in Irish, including a collection of short stories and two novels.

In 2007, a number of Canadian speakers founded the first officially designated "Gaeltacht" outside Ireland in an area near Kingston, Ontario. Despite its designation as the Permanent North American Gaeltacht, the area has no permanent Irish-speaking inhabitants. The site (also named Gaeltacht Bhaile na hÉireann) is located in Tamworth, Ontario, and operates as a retreat centre for Irish-speaking Canadians and Americans.

=== University and college courses ===
The Irish government provides funding for suitably qualified Irish speakers to travel to Canada and the United States to teach the language at universities. This program has been coordinated by the Fulbright Commission in the United States and the Ireland Canada University Foundation in Canada.

A number of North American universities have full-time lecturers in Modern Irish. These include Boston College, Harvard University, Lehman College-CUNY, New York University, Saint Mary's University in Halifax, the University of Pittsburgh, Concordia University in Montreal, Elms College, Catholic University of America and most notably the University of Notre Dame. Two of these institutions offer undergraduate degrees with advanced Irish language coursework, the University of Notre Dame with a BA in Irish Language and Literature and Lehman College-CUNY with a BA in Comparative Literature, while the University of Pittsburgh offers an undergraduate Irish Minor. Irish language courses are also offered at St Michael's College in the University of Toronto, at Cape Breton University, and at Memorial University in Newfoundland.

In a 2016 article for The Irish Times, Sinéad Ní Mheallaigh, who teaches Irish at Memorial University in St. John's, wrote, "There is a strong interest in the Irish language. Irish descendent and farmer Aloy O'Brien, who died in 2008 at the age of 93, taught himself Irish using the Buntús Cainte books and with help from his Irish-speaking grandmother. Aloy taught Irish in Memorial University for a number of years, and a group of his students still come together on Monday nights. One of his first students, Carla Furlong, invites the others to her house to speak Irish together as the 'Aloy O'Brien Conradh na Gaeilge' group."

Sinéad Ní Mheallaigh further wrote, "An important part of my role here in Newfoundland is organising Irish language events, both in the university and the community. We held an Irish language film festival on four consecutive Mondays throughout November. Each evening consisted of a short film, and a TG4 feature-length film, preceded by an Irish lesson. These events attracted people from all parts of society, not just those interested in Ireland and the language. The students took part in the international Conradh na Gaeilge events for 'Gaeilge 24' and we will have Gaelic sports and a huge Céilí mór later in March."

== Australia ==
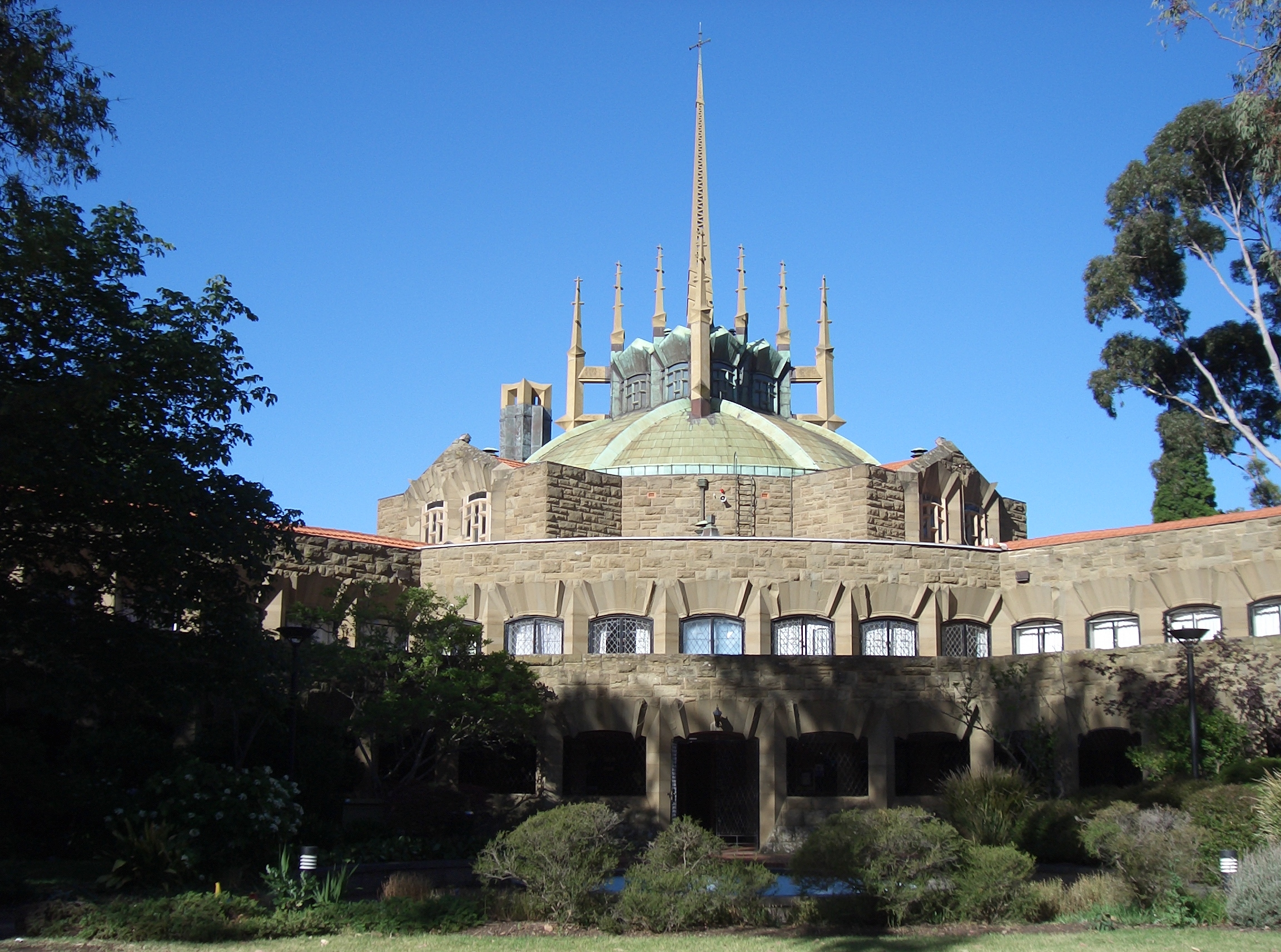
Newman College, University of Melbourne: holder of the O'Donnell Collection, an important collection of Irish-language material.

The Irish language reached Australia in 1788, along with English. Irish, when used by convicts in the early colonial period, was seen as a language of covert opposition, and was therefore viewed with suspicion by colonial authorities.

The Irish constituted a larger proportion of the European population than in any other British colony, and there has been debate about the extent to which Irish was used in Australia. The historian Patrick O'Farrell argued that the language was soon discarded; other historians, including Dymphna Lonergan and Val Noone, have argued that its use was widespread among the first generation, with some transmission to the second and occasional evidence of literacy. Most Irish immigrants came from counties in the west and south-west where Irish was strong (e.g. County Clare and County Galway). It has been argued that at least half the approximately 150,000 Irish emigrants to Victoria in the 19th century spoke Irish, helping to make Irish the most widely used European language in Australia after English.

English was essential to the Irish for their integration into public life. Irish, however, retained some cultural and symbolic importance, and the Gaelic revival was reflected in Australia in the work of local students and scholars. The language was taught in several Catholic schools in Melbourne in the 1920s, and a bilingual magazine called An Gael was published. In the following years a small group of enthusiasts in the major cities continued to cultivate the language.

In the 1970s there was a more general renewal of interest, supported by both local and immigrant activists. The Irish National Association, with support from the Sydney branch of the Gaelic League (Conradh na Gaeilge), ran free classes in Sydney from the 1960s through to 2007, when the language group became independent. In 1993 Máirtín Ó Dubhlaigh, a Sydney-based Irish speaker, and his partner at the time, Judy Pinder, founded the first Irish language summer school, Scoil Samhraidh na hAstráile. This brought together for the first time Irish speakers and teachers from all over the country. The language also attracted some wider public attention.

There is presently a network of Irish learners and users spread out across the country. The primary organised groups are the Irish Language Association of Australia (Cumann Gaeilge na hAstráile), Sydney Irish School and the Canberra Irish Language Association (Cumann Gaeilge Canberra). Multiple day courses are available twice a year in the states of Victoria and New South Wales. The association has won several prestigious prizes (the last in 2009 in a global competition run by Glór na nGael and sponsored by the Irish Department of Foreign Affairs).

The 2011 census indicated that 1,895 people used Irish as a household language in Australia. This marks an increase from the 2001 census, which gave a figure of 828. The census does not count those who use Irish or other languages outside the household context.

The Department of Celtic Studies at the University of Sydney offers courses in Modern Irish linguistics, Old Irish and Modern Irish language. The University of Melbourne houses a collection of nineteenth and early twentieth century books and manuscripts in Irish.

Australians continue to contribute poetry, fiction, and journalism to Irish-language literary magazines, both in print and on-line. There is also a widely distributed electronic newsletter in Irish called An Lúibín.

The Irish language poet Louis De Paor lived with his family in Melbourne from 1987 to 1996 and published his first two poetry collections during his residence there. De Paor also gave poetry readings and other broadcasts in Irish on the Special Broadcasting Service (a network set up for speakers of minority languages). He was given scholarships by the Australia Council in 1990, 1991 and 1995.

Colin Ryan is an Australian whose short stories, set mostly in Australia and Europe, have appeared in the journals Feasta, Comhar and An Gael. He has also published poetry. Cló Iar-Chonnacht has published two collections of short stories by him: Teachtaireacht (2015) and Ceo Bruithne (2019). Two collections of his poetry have been published by Coiscéim: Corraí na Nathrach (2017) and Rogha (2022)

Julie Breathnach-Banwait is an Australian citizen of Irish origin living in Western Australia. She is the author of a collection called Dánta Póca ('Pocket Poems'), published by Coiscéim in 2020 and Ar Thóir Gach Ní, published by Coiscéim in 2022. She has regularly published her poetry in The Irish Scene magazine in Western Australia. Her poetry has been published in Comhar (Ireland) and An Gael (New York) as well as on idler.ie. She is a native of Ceantar na nOileán in Connemara, County Galway.

== New Zealand ==
Irish migration to New Zealand was strongest in the 1840s, the 1860s (at the time of the gold rush) and the 1870s. These immigrants arrived at a time when the Irish language was still widely spoken in Ireland, particularly in the south-west and west. In the 1840s the New Zealand Irish included many discharged soldiers: over half those released in Auckland (the capital) in the period 1845–1846 were Irish, as were 56.8% of those released in the 1860s. There was, however, a fall in Irish immigration from the 1880s. At first the Irish clustered in certain occupations, with single women in domestic service and men working as navvies or miners. By the 1930s Irish Catholics were to be found in government service, in transport and in the liquor industry, and assimilation was well advanced.

The use of Irish was influenced by immigrants' local origins, the time of their arrival and the degree to which a sense of Irishness survived. In 1894 the New Zealand Tablet, a Catholic newspaper, published articles on the study of Irish. In 1895 it was resolved at a meeting in the city of Dunedin that an Irish-language society on the lines of the Philo-Celtic Society of the United States should be established in New Zealand. Chapters of the Gaelic League were founded in both Milton and Balclutha and items in Irish were published by the Southern Cross of Invercargill. In 1903 Fr. William Ganly, a native speaker of Connacht Irish from the Aran Islands who was very prominent in the Gaelic Revival in Melbourne, visited Milton, where he met a large number of Irish speakers.

The dwindling of Irish immigration, the decay of the Gaeltachtaí in Ireland and the passing of earlier generations were accompanied by a loss of the language. Interest is maintained among an activist minority.

== Argentina ==
Between 40,000 and 45,000 Irish emigrants went to Argentina in the 19th century. Of these, only about 20,000 settled in the country, the remainder returning to Ireland or re-emigrating to North America, Australia and other destinations. Of the 20,000 that remained, between 10,000 and 15,000 left no descendants or lost any link they had to the local Irish community. The nucleus of the Irish-Argentine community therefore consisted of only four to five thousand settlers.

Many came from a quadrangle on the Longford/Westmeath border, its perimeter marked by Athlone, Edgeworthstown, Mullingar and Kilbeggan. It has been estimated that 43.35% of emigrants were from Westmeath, 14.57% from Longford and 15.51% from Wexford. Such migrants tended to be younger sons and daughters of the larger tenant farmers and leaseholders, but labourers also came, their fares paid by sheep-farmers seeking skilled shepherds.

Irish census figures for the 19th century give an indication of the percentage of Irish speakers in the areas in question. Allowing for underestimation, it is clear that most immigrants would have been English speakers. Census figures for Westmeath, a major source of Argentinian immigrants, show the following percentages of Irish speakers: 17% in the period 1831–41, 12% in 1841–51, and 8% in 1851–61.

In the 1920s, there came a new wave of immigrants from Ireland, most being educated urban professionals who included a high proportion of Protestants. It is unlikely that there were many Irish speakers among them.

The persistence of an interest in Irish is indicated by the fact that the Buenos Aires branch of the Gaelic League was founded as early as 1899. It continued to be active for several decades thereafter, but evidence is lacking for organised attempts at language maintenance into the present day, though the Fahy Club in Buenos Aires continues to host Irish classes.

== See also ==
- Modern literature in Irish
- Teastas Eorpach na Gaeilge
