= Milltown, County Galway =

Milltown Baile an Mhuilinn (Irish)
- Village
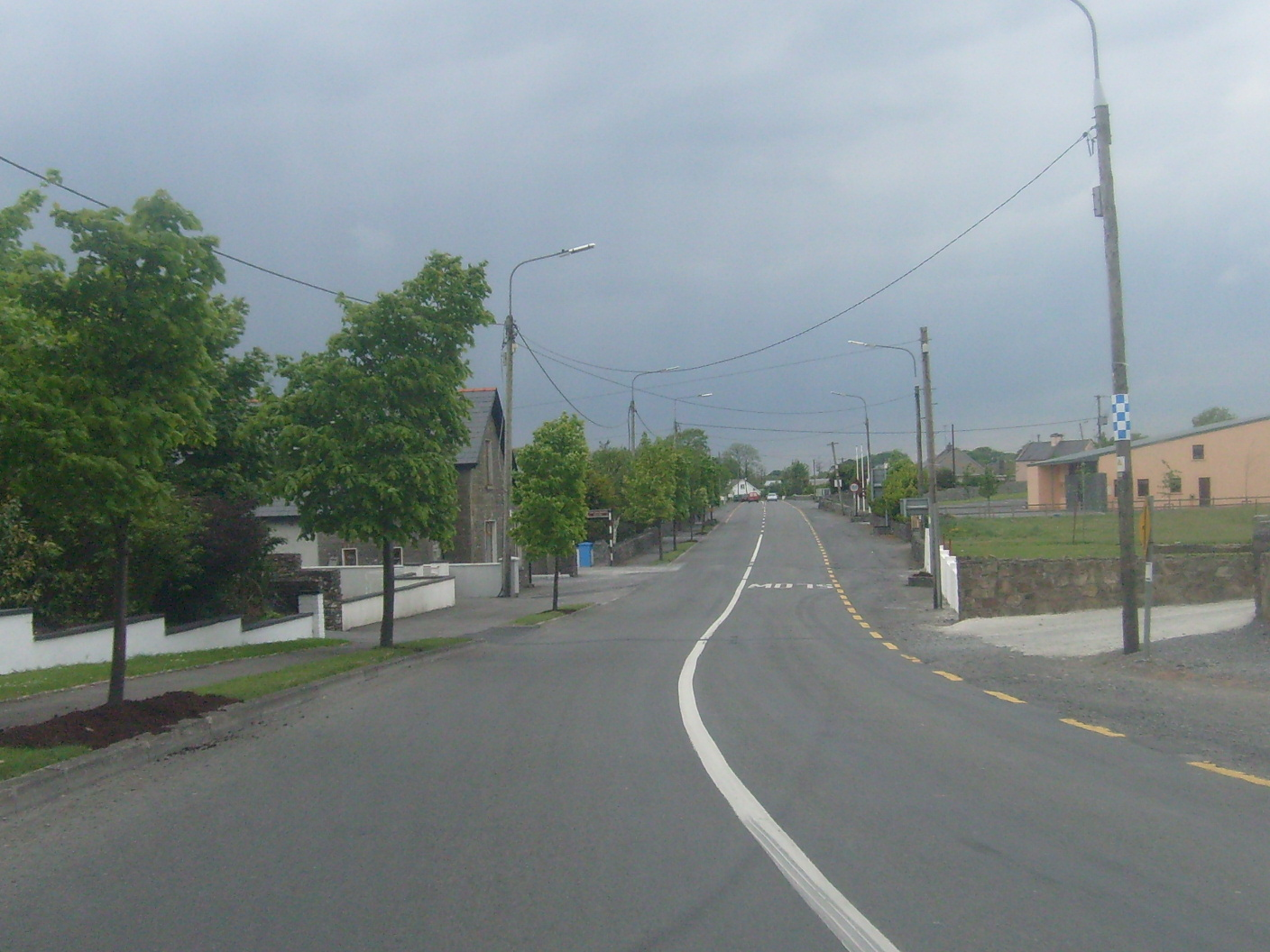
- Road through Milltown, County Galway

- Location in Ireland
- Coordinates: 53°36′54″N 8°54′02″W
- Country: Ireland
- Province: Connacht
- County: County Galway

Population (2016)
  - Total: 207
- Time zone: UTC+0 (WET)
  - Summer (DST): UTC-1 (IST (WEST))
- Irish Grid Reference: M369689
- Website: milltowngalway.com

Milltown (Irish: Baile an Mhuilinn) is a small village in County Galway, Ireland. It is situated on the banks of the River Clare, 47 km from Galway City, 11 km from Tuam on the N17 road to Sligo.

== History ==
The parish of Milltown is made up of the two civil parishes of Adergoole and Liskeevy, both of which are of medieval origin. The first historical record of Milltown dates back to 1589. According to historian Hubert Thomas Knox's History of Mayo, Sir Murrogh O'Flaherty and his clansmen came to attack Edward Bermingham. They stormed the castle, burnt half of Milltown and destroyed the castle's grainfields, but still failed to capture the castle after a bloody battle. On their return to Cong, they burned sixteen other villages and raided three thousand head of cattle.

The place name of Milltown or Baile an Mhuilinn (the town of the mill), is derived from the two mills located on the River Clare – O'Grady's mill at Milltown, and Birmingham's mill at Lack. O'Grady's mill was demolished in the 1950s during the Corrib River Drainage Scheme, while the ruins of Birmingham's mill can still be seen along the river. The Birmingham mill was a corn and tuck mill. It was noted in the valuation office Mill Brook records of the 1850s as having one pair of mill stones, a water wheel of 14 feet in diameter and valued at £2. The resident miller at the time was John Farrell.

=== Lurgan Canoe ===
In August 1902, a Bronze Age logboat was found in Lurgan Bog, by a local farmer. The boat was found while a bog drain was being deepened. Upon finding the fifty feet long boat, the find was reported to Sir Thomas Esmonde of the Royal Irish Academy. Esmonde visited Lurgan and bought the boat for £25. The canoe was moved from Lurgan to Milltown Railway Station by workmen. From there, it was taken by rail to The National Museum of Ireland in Dublin where it can still be viewed today.

The Lurgan Canoe is the oldest, intact logboat ever found in Western Europe. It is speculated by experts that the boat was made for ceremonial display, as it is considered too long to have been used for ordinary fishing or transport. The boat is radiocarbon dated to 2200 BC. It is likely to have been hollowed from a large oak tree, of a type which no longer exist today.

=== Bardic School of Kilclooney ===
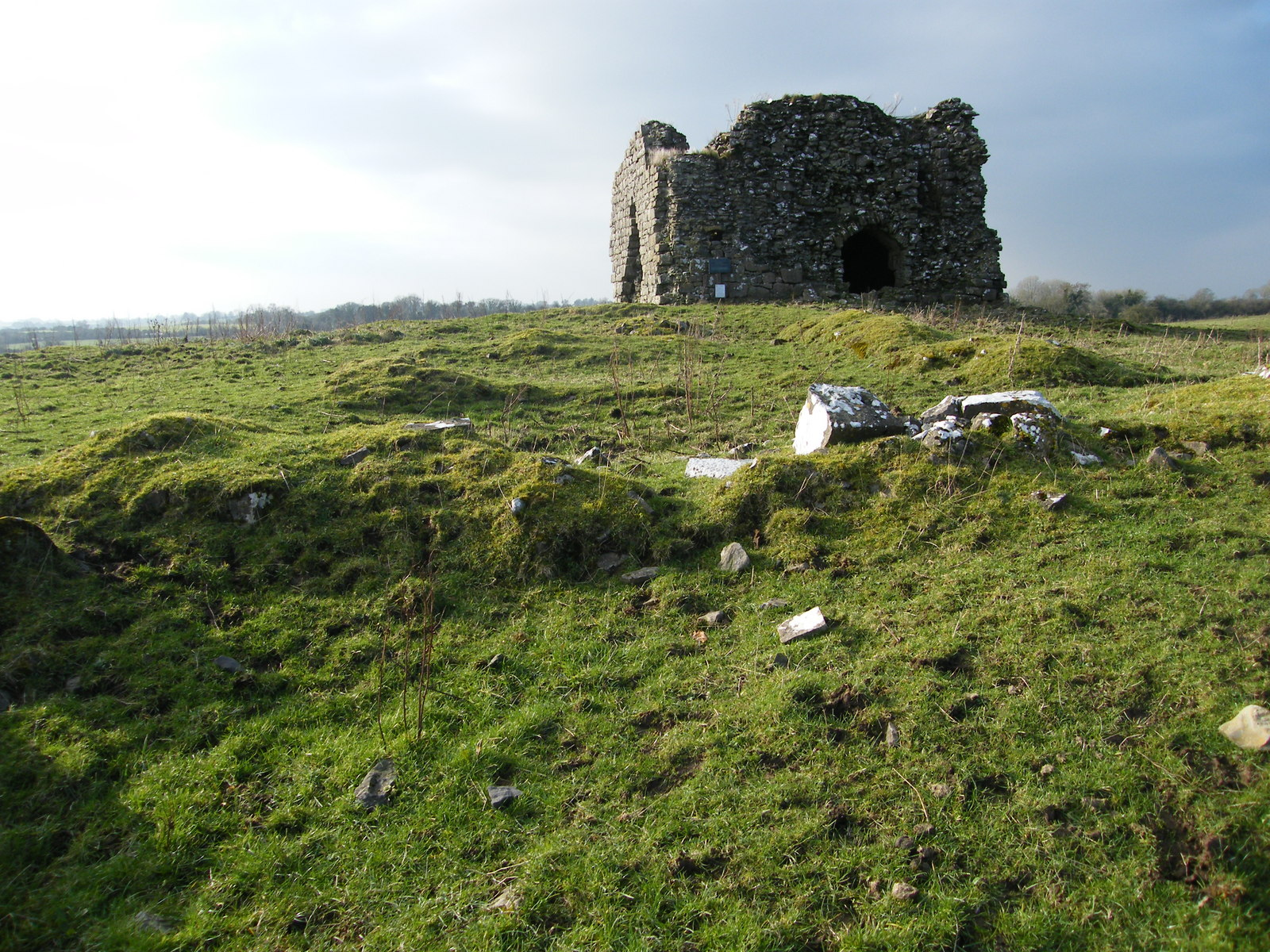
Remains of Kilclooney Castle near Milltown

Kilclooney Castle was once the home of the Ó hUigín bardic family and was occupied by Domhnall Ó hUiginn in 1574. Tadhg Dall Ó hÚigínn refers to a school of poetry here in the 16th century. It is stated that seventeen poets of Ulster's brightest progeny sought learning in Ceall Cluaine, while it is also reputed that students from Scotland may have studied there. Each student studied filíocht (poetry) for 12 years, in a school year lasting from November to March. It is said each student had his own stone hut where he could meditate on a prescribed theme before reciting his composition to his fellow students and tutor the following day.

Brian, Hugh and Tully Ó hUigín held three parts of Kilclooney in 1641 but their lands were granted to William Burke at the Restoration in the 1660s. A large portion of a castle or tower house can be seen today in quite a ruinous state, while there is no evidence of the stone huts. The foundation of a grassed-over rectangular building is also present.

=== Milltown Races ===
The Milltown Races date back to 1877, however; earlier race meetings date back as far as the 1840s organised by the local gentry held at the Race Park in Dalgin. These races were originally held on St. Patrick's Day but were later changed to Easter Monday at the turn of the century in hope of better weather conditions. The races saw thousands of people from all over Connacht each year.

Local publicans were organisers of the races and The Tuam Herald reported that "Porter ran in rivers down countless throats and corked concoctions sold by the million". By the 1930s, the races began to decline and were abandoned during World War II. They were revived again in 1952 but failed to attract past crowds. The last race meeting was held in 1966.

A carnival was organised in 1957 to begin on Easter Sunday and continue for two weeks in an effort to boost attendance numbers. Popular Showbands of the day performed at the carnival but increasing costs led to the death of the carnival. The final one was held in 1981.

=== War of Independence ===
The Irish War of Independence lasted from 1919 to 1921. When hostilities broke out in 1919, the Milltown IRA company numbered between 30 and 40 men, with others in the Ballindine company. Milltown was witness to two IRA ambushes, now known locally as the Egg Shed Ambush and the Cnocán Mór Ambush.

The egg shed in Milltown is a small shed with a red door and a sloped roof, located in front of the housing estate at Millbrook. The egg shed was once used for sorting and storing eggs for collection by egg buyers from other regions. In April 1921, two RIC constables returning to their barracks after patrolling the railway station, were attacked by local volunteers at the egg shed. The ambush was carried out by ten to twelve local men to take the policemen's rifles and ammunition. However; it was not long before a number of armed policemen and Black and Tans rushed to the scene from the nearby police barracks and managed to retrieve the rifles.

The Cnocán Mór Ambush occurred on 27 June 1921 on the Milltown-Tuam road. A flying column of seven local volunteers under the command of Tom Dunleavy, lay in wait for a combined RIC and Black and Tan patrol close to Carrowreagh. Two members of the patrol were killed, Sergeant James Murrin and Constable Edgar Day, while a policeman was wounded and a Black and Tan named Carter escaped. Sergeant Murrin was to have retired on a pension a week earlier but due to a problem with his final documentation, he was required to remain at his post. Constable Day was a young man from Nottingham.

After the Cnocán Mór Ambush, many arrests were made and many of those arrested were beaten. The Black and Tans carried out cruel reprisals by setting fire to the house of David Flannery in Liskeavy, but the fire was put out by family members and neighbours before it became too severe. However; the Hannon family of Belmont fared much worse as their home was burned to the ground. Curfew was also imposed.

=== Civil War ===
The Irish Civil War lasted from 1922 to 1923. The cause of the conflict was a split over the Anglo-Irish Treaty (1921) between those who supported it (Pro-Treaty), and those who opposed it (Anti-Treaty). A number of local men who had fought side by side during the War of Independence now fought each other.

The most renowned incident of the Civil War in the locality took place at the gates of Milbrook House in an event later to become known as The Grand Gates Ambush. A petty session's clerk, James McDonagh from the Conagher townland was suspected by local Fenians to be a Police Spy. Allegedly, Joe Dalton, manager of McDonnell's Store (later Glynn's shop) engaged in conversation with McDonagh at the bar until McDonagh had become intoxicated. Dalton's barman named Roche and a number of other local Fenians set up an ambush at Milbrook. While McDonagh was then walking home drunk, he was killed at the Gates of Milbrook house. Roche emigrated to America shortly afterwards to avoid prosecution.

== Transport ==
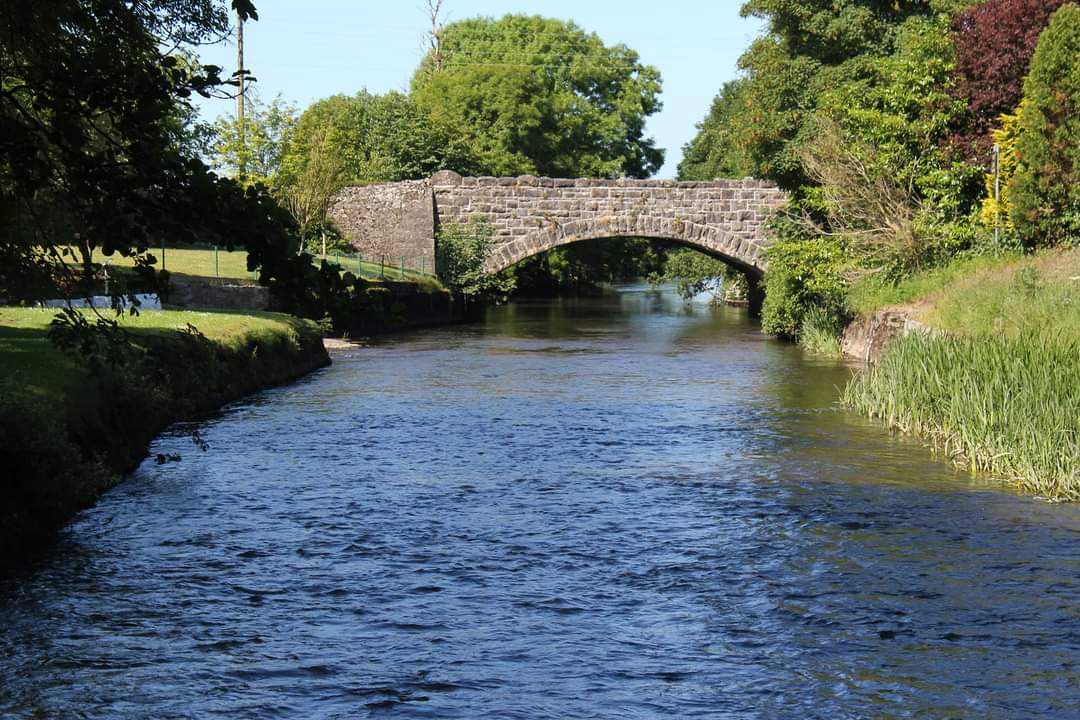
Bridge over the River Clare in the centre of Milltown

Milltown railway station opened on 30 April 1894 and closed on 17 June 1963. Milltown is one of the former stations on the Western Railway Corridor. It is located between Tuam and Claremorris. In October 2026, it was reported that the station at Milltown was being considered for inclusion in the proposed restoration of the Athenry-Claremorris line.

Milltown is served by the N17 road from Tuam to Sligo.

== Religion ==
The present parish of Milltown was formed with the unification of the parishes of Adergoole and Liskeavy at some point between the years 1704 and 1801 (A third parish of Kilclooney possibly also existed in earlier times according to D'Alton: History of the Archdiocese of Tuam). Prior to this, Liskeavy and Adergoole were separate parishes with churches in each, while there was no church in Milltown. In 1803, a thatched oblong church was built in Kilclooney measuring approximately eighty feet by twenty. A much smaller church was also built around the same time as Kilclooney in the townland of Kilerneen or Drim.

The old church in Milltown was built in 1831 on a site provided by the Bodkin landlord family. This church was replaced by the present St. Joseph's Church in Milltown which was built in 1969/70. The construction of the church cost £75,000 and was designed by John Thompson and Partners, Limerick and constructed by local builder Frank Birmingham and co. The stained glass windows in the church were designed by George Walsh and painted by William Earley.

St. Patrick's Church, Ballyglass serves the Mayo area of the parish and was erected in 1879. It is believed to have been constructed on the site of an earlier thatched Penal Church. The stained glass windows of the church were designed by Joshua Clarke of Dublin, father of artist Harry Clarke.

Cemeteries in use in Milltown are located in Kilclooney, Adergoole and Kilgevrin.

== Sport ==
=== Gaelic Football ===
Milltown GAA is the local Gaelic Athletic Association club which was established in 1953. The home ground is Fr. Conroy Park. Milltown have won the Galway Senior Football Championship on two occasions – 1971 and 1981. Milltown players have included Noel Tierney, Gay McManus and Joe Waldron.

Milltown Ladies' Gaelic Football club was founded in 1998. Underage teams play in the Galway league and championship and the first team compete at Intermediate level. The ladies' team have won a number of Kilmacud Crokes All-Ireland 7-Aside tournaments in both the Junior and Intermediate grades respectively.

=== Handball ===
The original proposal of a construction of a handball alley in Milltown was made in the 1800s. In the 1920s and '30s, handball was more popular than football. From May to October, the alley was occupied all day on Sundays and also during the long summer evenings. During the Second World War, handballs became impossible to obtain and the sport began to decline, never regaining popularity.

== Amenities ==
There is also a 550-metre walk along the River Clare, for which the Local Development Association has won a number of awards. It also has a 4.5 km Slí na Sláinte rural walk, for which it won first place in County Galway in the National Tidy Town Awards for 8 years from 1996 to 2003. A telescope which belonged to John Birmingham is on display at the Milltown community museum.

== Twinned village ==
Milltown is twinned with the village of Llanddarog in Wales.

== Notable people ==
- Thomas Beirne (1871–1949) – Writer of Modern literature in Irish and Roman Catholic priest
- John Birmingham (1816–1884) – Astronomer, poet and geologist
- Diarmaid Blake – Former Galway inter-county Gaelic footballer
- Jim Carney – Poet, journalist and television presenter
- William Connolly (born 1839) – Irish piper
- Pádraig Coyne – Former Galway inter-county footballer
- Patrick Duggan (1813–1896) – Catholic bishop
- Richard W. Dowling (1838–1867) – Commander at the Second Battle of Sabine Pass in the American Civil War
- Mícheál Ó Lócháin (1836–1899) – Founder of the Philo-Celtic Society, writer, magazine editor, and the driving force, despite living in the Irish diaspora in the United States, behind the beginning of the Gaelic revival
- Michael Henegan (1929–2002) – Recipient of the Scott Medal
- Sabina Higgins – First Lady of Ireland and former actress
- Gay McManus – Former Galway football captain
- M. J. Molloy (1914–1994) – Playwright and folklorist
- Mary Mitchell O'Connor – Former Fine Gael TD
- Frank J. Hugh O'Donnell (1894–1976) – Dramatist, senator and critic
- Noel Tierney – All-Ireland winner with Galway in 1964, 1965 and 1966
- Tomás Tierney – Former Galway football captain
- Joe Waldron – Former Galway inter-county footballer

== See also ==
- Kilgevrin
- List of towns and villages in Ireland
