= Julie Breathnach-Banwait =

Irish poet

Julie Breathnach-Banwait is an Irish-language poet from Ceantar na nOileán in Connemara, County Galway. She has published several collections. As of 2020, she had lived with her family in Australia "for over a decade" and was publishing works both in Irish and English.

Breathnach-Banwait was brought up in an Irish-speaking community and first encountered English at school. She later studied at the University of Wales and became a psychologist. She returned to Irish as a medium of expression after two decades in Australia, and also served as editor of the Journal of the Australian Irish Heritage Association.

She has stated that, as a psychologist, bilingualism and social constructionism seemed linked, reflecting on how "assumptions of our reality are shaped and moulded by shared understandings, and the impact of culture and language on these constructs”. She has said that she writes in Irish to remind herself of who she is, and to balance herself between two linguistic worlds.

Breathnach-Banwait has published in Tinteán (Australia), in An Gael (New York) and in Comhar (Ireland).

She is associated with Bobtail Books, an Australian publishing house devoted to bilingual publishing.

== Collections ==
- Dánta Póca (Coiscéim 2020)
- Ar Thóir Gach Ní (Coiscéim 2022)
- Cnámha Scoilte / Split Bones (Bobtail Books 2023) ISBN 0645748919
- Ó Chréanna Eile / From Other Earths (Bobtail Books 2024) (with Colin Ryan) ISBN 0645748935
