= Thomas Beirne =

Thomas Beirne may refer to:

- Thomas Beirne (writer) (1871–1949), Irish language writer and activist
- Thomas Beirne (businessman) (1860–1949), businessman, politician and philanthropist in Australia
