= Mícheál Ó Lócháin =

Irish activist

Mícheál Ó Lócháin (1836–1899) was an Irish-American writer, magazine editor, and teacher in New York City Catholic schools. While living as part of the Irish diaspora in the United States, Ó Lócháin became one of the driving forces behind the beginning of the Gaelic revival and on behalf of both preserving and teaching the Irish language outside Ireland. He founded both the Philo-Celtic Society and the first periodical in which Modern literature in Irish had a major place. As such, the ongoing language revival efforts for Irish and other threatened Celtic languages relies heavily upon tactics that Ó Lócháin helped pioneer and are equally part of his legacy.

== Early life ==
Ó Lócháin was born 29 September 1836 in Curraghderry, Milltown, County Galway. It is likely that his mother was an Irish language monoglot speaker. Ó Lócháin himself was fluent in both Irish and English. It is likely he began attending a local hedge school when he was nine, until 1854.

== Life in America ==
He emigrated to America and may have acquired his first job there as a teacher in 1870. In 1872 he wrote letters to The Irish World, an Irish-American journal, suggesting "the necessity of preserving the Irish language in order to preserve Irish nationality" and recommending that classes and societies be founded to accomplish this. In that same year he himself established a "Philo-Celtic" Irish language class for adults at the Catholic school in Brooklyn where he taught. From this came the Philo-Celtic Society of Boston, followed by its chapters in Brooklyn and Manhattan.

In 1881 Ó Lócháin founded An Gaodhal, the Philo-Celtic Society's bilingual journal. It lasted until 1904 and was revived intermittently thereafter, until a successor, entirely in Irish and called An Gael, was founded in 2009. Ó Lócháin wrote a good deal for An Gaodhal, his style being described as lively and pugnacious.

Between 1878 and 1899 chapters of the Philo-Celtic Society were established throughout America, though Ó Lócháin was increasingly dissatisfied with the way in which they gave priority to social activities at the expense of the Irish language.

In 1891 the prominent Gaelic revival scholar Douglas Hyde visited the United States. He visited a Philo-Celtic class in the Bowery and found it full of fluent Irish speakers. What he saw there may have influenced him when he helped found the Gaelic League in Ireland in 1893.

== Death and legacy ==
Ó Lócháin died in 1899 and was buried in Holy Cross Cemetery, Brooklyn.

In 1999, the centenary of Ó Lócháin's death was celebrated in his native Milltown, to honour the village's Irish language past. 1999 also marked the centenary of Ó Lócháin's fellow Milltown man and prominent Gael, Liam Beirne's, ordination into the priesthood.

The event included Mass in Irish in St. Joseph's Church, Milltown which was then followed by a ceilidh performed by local Irish traditional musicians. A lecture was then given by Ó Lócháin's biographer, Fionnuala Uí Fhlannagáin, who described him as a pioneer of the Irish language movement in America.
