= Kilgevrin =

Townland in County Galway, Ireland

Coordinates: 53°35′58″N 8°54′46″W

Kilgevrin (Irish: Cill Ghoibhreann) is a townland near the village of Milltown in north County Galway, Ireland. It is situated in the civil parish of Liskeevy, in the historical barony of Dunmore. Kilgevrin is 3.1 square kilometres (1.2 sq mi) in area, and is bounded on the north by the parish of Addergoole and townland of Banagher, on the east by both Banagher and Clashaghanny and on the south and west by the parish of Kilbannon and Tuam.

The 17th century Down Survey records, under the name of "Killinleagh", state that the owner of Kilgevrin was provost of Tuam, a protestant. 146 acres of unprofitable land and 272 acres of profitable land were specified.

John O'Donovan's field names books (of 1838) provide 3 various spellings of this townland: Kilgevrin, Cill Ghoibhrion and Killegevrin. According to this source, Kilgevrin was the property of W Jas Lynch, Toanlagee, County Galway. It is recorded as containing 767½ acres stature measure including about 163 acres of bog. An ancient fort was recorded in the north end of Kilgevrin as well as a triangulation station.

In the census of 1911, there were 32 registered family names living in Kilgevrin. According to the 2011 census, there were 88 people living in 27 homes in Kilgevrin.
