= Coláiste na nGael =

Irish language promotional organisation

- Formation: 2000; 26 years ago
- Founder: Christy Evans; Cathal Ó Beirne
- Fields: Irish language education and advocacy

Coláiste na nGael is a language school, focused on the Irish language, based in England. The organisation is also involved in promoting the Irish language in Britain. As of 2011, it was reportedly running 40 night classes in Britain, and by 2014 was teaching Irish to approximately 25 children in England.

== History ==
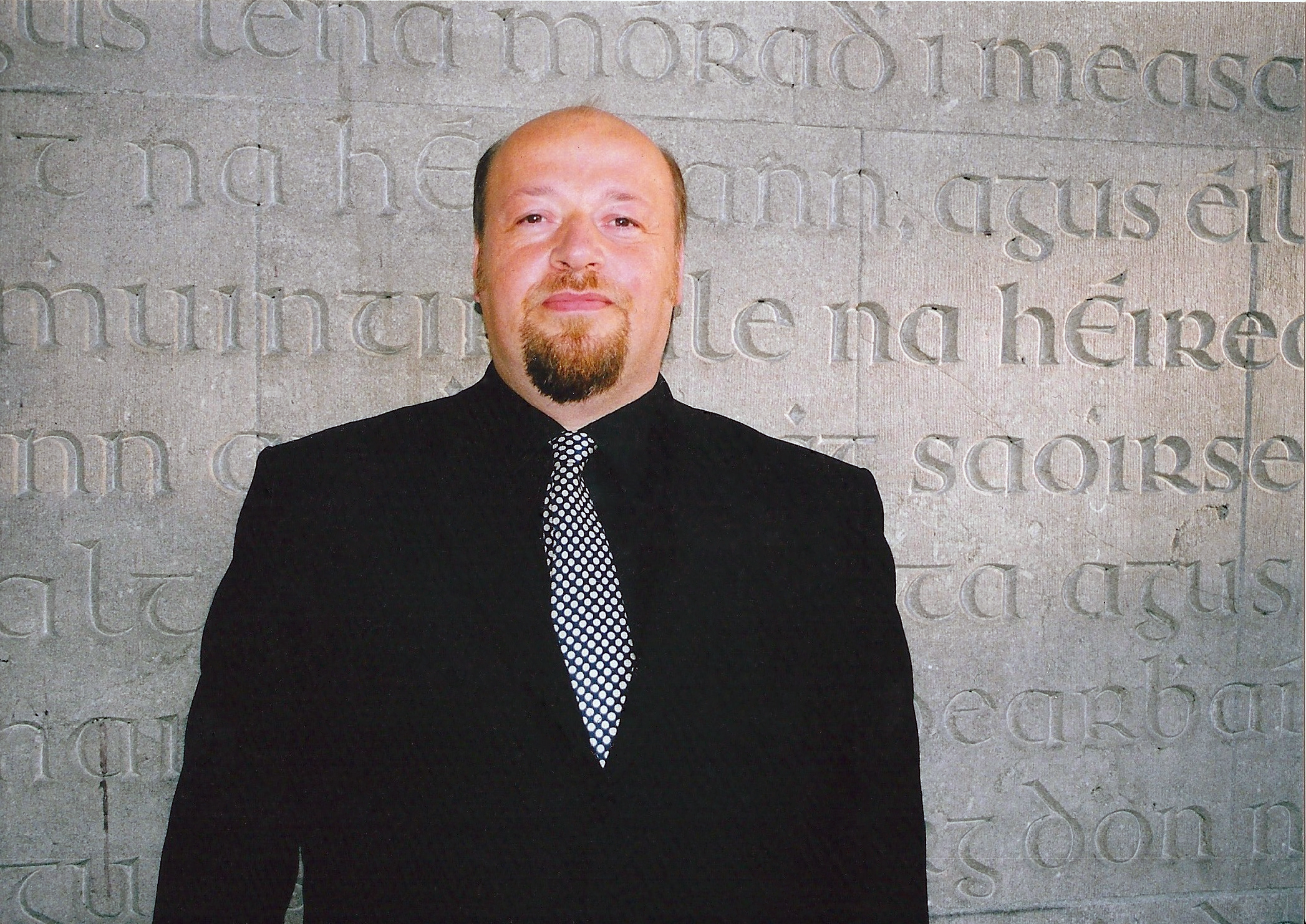
Christy Evans, founder of Coláiste na nGael

Coláiste na nGael was established in 2000 by Christy Evans and Cathal Ó Beirne as a volunteering group. The organisation has been involved in organising classes, book fairs, trips, weekend workshops and seminars. As of 2006, it was publishing a triannual newsletter titled Iris na Gaeilge.

Christy Evans, the founder of Coláiste na nGael, received a "Pride of Ireland" teaching award from The Irish Post in 2007.

As of 2009, Coláiste na nGael was reportedly participating in discussions with other Irish language organisations such as Glór na nGael and some local branches of Conradh na Gaeilge.

Together with Donal Kelleher, who is also involved in running Coláiste na nGael, Christy Evans undertook research on the Irish language in Britain and presented the resulting report to 10 Downing Street in 2011.

As of 2011, the Coláiste na nGael Irish college was running "40 night classes around the country [UK]". In 2014, the organisation was reportedly providing Irish classes to 25 children in England. In an interview in Beo! in May 2014, Evans also stated that the organisation was undertaking classes in schools in England for that year's Seachtain na Gaeilge.

In 2012, after changes to how the GCSE curriculum was administered in Wales and England meant students could no longer take Irish as an exam subject there, Coláiste na nGael started a campaign to reinstate it. The campaign, which involved various groups, gained support from TDs in Dublin and an MP in London (Chris Ruane of Labour) was reportedly intending to raise the issue in parliament. A partial re-introduction was announced in 2015, to take effect in 2017, a delay which the organisation said was "not acceptable".

Coláiste na nGael was still active as of 2022.
