= Pádraig Phiarais Cúndún =

Irish poet (1777–1856)

- Born: 1777 Ballymacoda, County Cork, Ireland
- Died: 13 March 1857 (aged 79–80) Deerfield, New York, U.S.
- Resting place: St. Agnes Cemetery, Utica, New York, U.S.
- Occupation: Poet
- Language: Irish
- Spouse: Mairéad Nic Charrthaigh (m. 1811; died 1840)

Pádraig Phiarais Cúndún (1777 – 13 March 1857) was an Irish poet who emigrated to the United States, where he continued composing poetry in Munster Irish and contributed to literature in the Irish language outside Ireland.

== Life ==
Cúndún was born in Ballymacoda, County Cork, and likely learned to read and write in the Irish language at a local hedge school. He emigrated to America with his family around 1826 and settled with them on a frontier homestead near Deerfield, New York. There were many other Irish-immigrants in and around Deerfield and Cúndún was easily able to remain a monoglot Irish-speaker and never learned the English language. Meanwhile, he regularly wrote and received letters in Irish from his relatives and former neighbors and remained in close contact with events in Ballymacoda. Cúndún died in Deerfield in 1857. He is buried at St. Agnes Cemetery in Utica, New York.

== Legacy ==
The Irish language poetry that Cúndún composed in America survives through the letters he wrote to his relatives and former neighbors in Ballymacoda and due to the fact that his son, "Mr. Pierce Condon of South Brooklyn", arranged for two of his father's poems to be posthumously published by the New York City newspaper The Irish-American in 1858. The first collection of Cúndún's Irish language poetry was edited by Risteard Ó Foghludha and published in 1932. Kerby A. Miller also repeatedly quoted Cúndún's poetry in the 1985 book Emigrants and Exiles: Ireland and the Irish Exodus to North America. His poetry and letters also continue to be consulted by scholars.

Along with fellow Irish-language poets Diarmuid na Bolgaí Ó Sé and Máire Bhuidhe Ní Laoghaire, Pádraig Phiarais Cúndún adapted the Jacobite tradition of Aisling poetry to more recent political struggles by the Irish people. Therefore, Cúndún's poetry helped inspire the verse of more recent Irish-language poets such as Seán Gaelach Ó Súilleabháin, who adapted the Aisling tradition to the events of the Easter Rising of 1916 and the Irish War of Independence.

Kenneth E. Nilsen, an American linguist with a specialty in Celtic languages, referred to Cúndún as "the most notable Irish monoglot speaker to arrive in this country". Nilsen also stated that Cúndún's "letters and poems, written in upstate New York to his neighbors in Ballymacoda, County Cork, represent the most important body of Pre-Famine writing in Irish from the United States".
