= Pádraig Ó hÉigeartaigh =

Irish poet

- Born: February 12, 1871; Breahig, Dromod, Iveragh, County Kerry, Ireland
- Died: January 17, 1936 (aged 64); Springfield, Massachusetts, U.S.
- Resting place: St. Michael's Cemetery, Springfield
- Spouse: Catherine Ward
- Children: 7
- Writing career
- Genre: Poetry

Pádraig Ó hÉigeartaigh (1871–1936) was an Irish poet.

== Life ==
=== Early life ===
A native of Uíbh Ráthach, County Kerry, Ó hÉigeartaigh emigrated with his father, Patrick, a laborer, and his mother, Mary Lynch, to the United States when he was 12 years old and worked in a cotton factory. He lived his adult life in Springfield, Massachusetts.

=== Family and civic life ===
Ó hÉigeartaigh had three daughters and four sons with his wife, Catherine Ward. Two of his sons, Donncha and Diarmuid, were twins. He worked at the Charles F. Lynch Clothing Company for 30 years and then established his own clothing store.

Ó hÉigeartaigh participated in many Irish organizations such as the Springfield branch of the Conradh na Gaeilge, established on 22 February 1897. His duties there included teaching and administrative work. He was also an active in the Ancient Order of Hibernians, the Springfield unit of the Army of the Republic, The American Association for the Recognition for the Irish Republic, the John Boyle O'Reilly club and participated in the Springfield Feis events organized in the early part of the 1900s.

=== Literary works ===
During the Gaelic revival, Ó hÉigeartaigh wrote a regular Irish-language column titled Ón dhomhan diar, about the hardships faced by Irish immigrants in the United States for Patrick Pearse's An Claidheamh Soluis. Ó hÉigeartaigh also wrote poetry for the same publication in Munster Irish.

Ó hÉigeartaigh wrote one of his most famous poems, Ochón! a Dhonncha ("My Sorrow, Dhonncha!"), as a lament for his six-year-old son, Donncha, who, while walking home from school on 22 August 1905, fell into Springfield's Lombard Reservoir and drowned. The poem was first published in April 1906. At the time, authors of the Gaelic revival preferred to write in the Classical Gaelic, the literary language once common to the Gaels of both Ireland and Scotland, and felt scorn for the oral poetry of the Gaeltachtaí. Ó hÉigeartaigh, however, drew upon that very tradition to express his grief and proved that it could still be used very effectively by an early 20th-century poet. Ochón! a Dhonncha has a permanent place in the literary canon of Irish poetry in the Irish language and has been translated into English by both Patrick Pearse and Thomas Kinsella.

== Death ==
Ó hÉigeartaigh died of pneumonia in 1936 in Springfield, MA.

== See also ==
- Gaelic revival
- Irish language outside Ireland
