= William Connolly (piper) =

William Connolly (1839-1870s/1880s), was an Irish piper in the mid-19th century, in Ireland and The United States.

William Connolly was born in Milltown, County Galway, to Liam Dáll Connolly (whose grandson was piper John Burke). His brother John, was also a piper.

Early in life, he and his brother John travelled to Liverpool, sailing from there to the United States, where John settled. William travelled on to Canada, playing, "in that country for an unusually long time" on steamers up and down the St. Lawrence River.

Having made a great deal of money, he relocated to Brooklyn, New York, where he bought a house. This was sold in 1863 as Connolly feared he would be drafted into the Union army as a result of the ongoing American Civil War. "Besides, he realized that it was much easier for him to handle a chanter than a rifle, so he lost no time in getting back to Liverpool, in which cosmopolitan city he remained four years."

He returned to Milltown after leaving Liverpool and before sailing again to the US, "Modesty evidently was not his most conspicuous virtue, for we are told that he engaged a boy to carry his set of bagpipes through Milltown, with a view to impress the people with a due sense of his importance."

He settled this time in Waltham, Massachusetts, where he built a dance hall. Restless, he made San Francisco his home for a time, returning to Waltham, then back to San Francisco. He left California for the last time intending to buy the Hibernian Hall in Brooklyn, but was unable, "as his wife would not consent to the sale of her home in Waltham". He then moved to Pittsburgh, where he died sometime in the 1870s or perhaps 1880s.

His brother John also appears to have spent some time in San Francisco. According to fellow piper, Patsy Touhey, John Connolly died about 1895 at Milford, Massachusetts.

O'Neill reported that, "Mr. Burke, to whom we are indebted for the above information, says "William Connolly was the best general player on the Irish pipes on either side of the Atlantic." Michael Egan, the famous maker of the Irish or Union pipes, who knew all the best pipers of his day, was of the same opinion."

== See also ==
- Paddy Conneely (died 11 September 1851), Irish piper.
- Patsy Touhey (1863-1925), piper
- Johnny Doran (c.1907-9 January 1950), piper

== Sources ==
- Famous Pipers who flourished principally in the second half of the nineteenth century Chapter 21 in Irish Minstrels and Musicians, by Capt. Francis O'Neill, 1913.
