= Ballymacoda =

Village in County Cork, Ireland

Ballymacoda Baile Mhac Óda
- Village
- Location in Ireland
- Coordinates: 51.8922°N 7.946°W
- Country: Ireland
- Province: Munster
- County: County Cork

Population (2016)
  - Total: 185
- Time zone: UTC+0 (WET)
  - Summer (DST): UTC-1 (IST (WEST))

Ballymacoda (Irish: Baile Mhac Óda) is a small village in County Cork, Ireland. As of the 2016 census, the village had a population of 185 people.

Located in East Cork, the village is home to one pub, a post office, and Saint Peter in Chains Roman Catholic church. This church was built between 1855 and 1865 and replaced an earlier church on the same site, and is in the Diocese of Cloyne and the parish of Ballymacoda and Ladysbridge. The local GAA club, Fr. O'Neill's GAA, represents the same parish area. The club fields hurling and Gaelic football teams in competitions organised by the Cork county board and Imokilly division.

The Ballymacoda Bay SPA (Special Protection Area) and Ballymacoda SAC (Special Area of Conservation) are protected wetlands, designated to be of importance under the Ramsar Convention and EU legislation, located just north and east of the village.

== Notable people ==
- Piaras Mac Gearailt (1709-c.1792), a Hiberno-Norman and Jacobite Chief Bard of the district; known for his Aisling war poetry in Munster Irish during the 18th-century.
- Pádraig Phiarais Cúndún (1777–1856), Irish poet who emigrated around 1826 and continued writing poetry in the Irish language while in America, which he mailed to his former neighbours in Ballymacoda.
- Peter O'Neill Crowley (1832–1867), local leader of the Irish Republican Brotherhood who died during the Fenian Rising of 1867. He is buried in Ballymacoda.
