= Conmaicne Dúin Móir =

Early people of Ireland

The Conmaicne Dúin Móir/Conmaicne Dúna Móir (transl. Conmaicne of the great fort), also known as Cenél Dubáin or Conmaicne Cenéoil Dubáin, were an early people of Ireland. Their tuath comprised at least the barony of Dunmore, in County Galway.

== Origin ==
The Conmhaicne or Conmaicne were a people of early Ireland, perhaps related to the Laigin, who dispersed to various parts of Ireland. They settled in Connacht and Longford, giving their name to several Conmaicne territories. Other branches of Conmaicne were located in County Galway, Roscommon, Mayo, and Leitrim.

== Territory ==
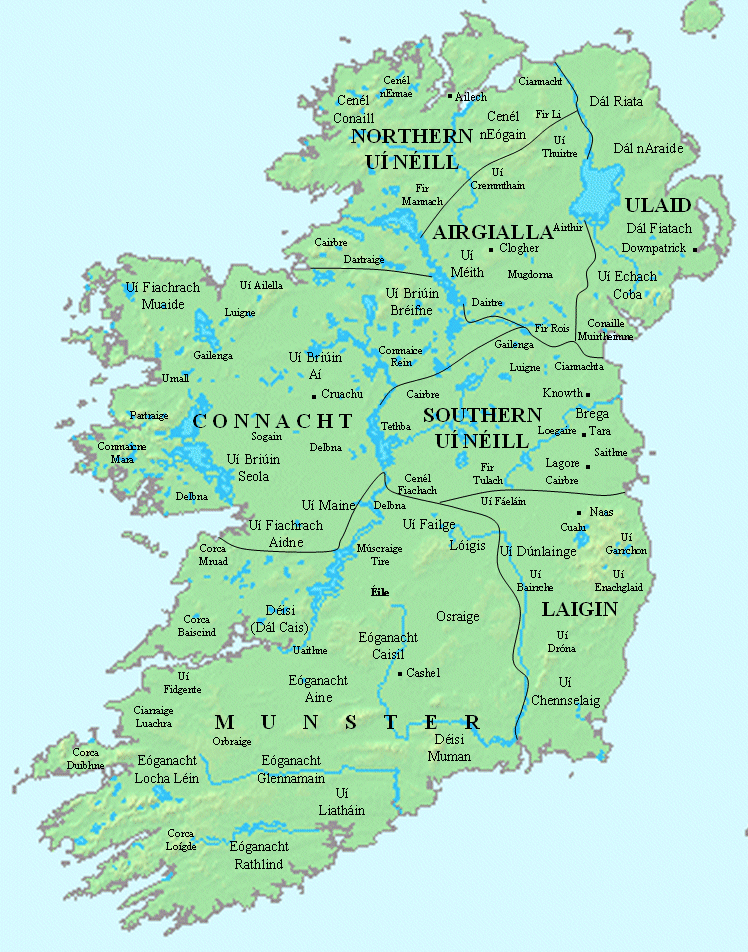
Early peoples and kingdoms of Ireland, c.800

Knox stated the tuath comprised the barony of Dunmore, part of Ballymoe, and at least Belclare parish. However O'Donovan says the territory comprised only the barony of Dunmore.

Conmaicne Dunmore was centred about the present town of Dunmore, County Galway (burnt in 1249, 1284, and 1315, and walled in 1280), which is bounded by rising land in the north, and bogland east and west. Moated sites were situated some distance to the south and west of Dunmore, at Darrary North, Carrow-munniagh, and south-west at Doonbally. A possible deserted village was located south-west at Castletown. Settlement was seemingly concentrated in the south-east part of Cenel Dhubhain.

== Septs ==
From 800 AD the Uí Briúin Aí were the dominant tribe of Connaught, settling clans ('the Silmurray') in various tuaths, including among the Conmaicne Dunmore. The Castle of Dunmore in Conmaicne Cinel Dubhain, was later called Dun Mor Fheorais.

== Patrican link ==
In the original Vita tripartita Sancti Patricii, Tírechán said Saint Patrick travelled through Conmaicne Dunmore to Conmaicne Cuile Tolad. Churches of Patrician origin in Conmaicne Dunmore were not identified.

== Abbey ==
The abbey at Dun-more, a friary of the Order of Saint Augustine, was established by Anglo-Normans in 1425.

== People ==
- Saint Benignus, who supposedly founded the church at Kilbannon near Tuam, belonged to the Conmaicne of Dunmore.

== See also ==
- Conmhaicne
- Dunmore, County Galway
