= Milltown railway station =

Railway station in County Galway, Ireland

Milltown Baile an Mhuilinn
- Asahi liner train approaching Milltown in 1985

General information
- Location: Pollaturick, County Galway; Ireland
- Coordinates: 53.6177°N 8.9193°W
- Line: Athenry to Claremorris

History
- Opened: 1894
- Closed: 1963
Location

Milltown railway station is a disused railway station close to the village of Milltown in County Galway. The station was originally opened by the Waterford, Limerick and Western Railway in April 1894 on the route between Limerick and Claremorris. The station was closed to passengers in 1963.

The reopening of the Athenry to Claremorris railway was recommended within the 2024 All-Island Strategic Rail Review. Funding for the reopening of the Athenry-Claremorris line and was granted in November 2025, with works proposed to commence within 18 months of the announcement. In October 2026, the station at Milltown was reported to be under consideration for inclusion in the project, due to commence in 2028, with a potential park-and-ride facility also proposed.
