= Peter O'Neill Crowley =

Irish rebel (1832–1867)

- Peadar Ó Néill Ua Cruadhlaoich; Paidir Ó Néill Ua Gruadhiaoich
- Born: 23 May 1832; Ballymacoda, County Cork, Ireland
- Died: 31 March 1867 (aged 34); Mitchelstown, County Cork, Ireland
- Burial place: St. Peter in Chains churchyard, Ballymacoda; 51°53′31″N 7°56′25″W
- Military career
- Allegiance: Irish Republican Brotherhood
- Branch: Fenian Brotherhood

Peter O'Neill Crowley (23 May 1832 – 31 March 1867) was an Irish republican who died in the Fenian Rising of 1867.

== Early years ==
Peter O'Neill Crowley was born in Ballymacoda in 1832; his father was a farmer and his granduncle Fr. Peter O'Neill was a Catholic priest, who had been flogged after participating in the 1798 Rebellion, and later transported to Botany Bay. Peter O'Neill Crowley was a teetotaller.

== Fenian Rising ==
O'Neill Crowley joined the Irish Republican Brotherhood and led a local group in Ballymacoda of about 100 men. In 1867, he took part in the Fenian Rising. Under the command of Captain John McClure, he was part of the 5 March attack on Killadoon coastguard station, with the aim of seizing weapons kept there. They took the weapons and marched towards Killeagh with prisoners, expecting to join up with units from Youghal and Midleton. However, there were only a few men to meet them; the rising was a failure in the area, in part due to snowy weather and local informers. McClure decided to disband all unarmed men, and march with the remaining men and prisoners to Castlemartyr, where the prisoners were released. With some comrades he took refuge in Kilclooney Wood. There, on 31 March, they were ambushed by British soldiers and O'Neill Crowley was injured. The Fenians were captured and taken to Mitchelstown, where O'Neill Crowley died.

== Legacy ==
O'Neill Crowley was noted for his piety and the priest who administered the Last Rites noted his faith, recounting his last words: "Father, I have two loves in my heart – one for my religion, the other for my country. I am dying today for the fatherland. I could die as cheerfully for faith." O'Neill Crowley became a martyr of the rebellion. His comrades reputedly carried his body on their backs from Mitchelstown to Ballymacoda, about 57 km (35 mi).

Many places in County Cork are named for O'Neill Crowley, including:

- O'Neill Crowley Terrace, Mitchelstown
- O'Neill Crowley Street, Youghal
- O'Neill-Crowley Quay, Fermoy
- O'Neill Crowley Terrace, Castlemartyr
- O'Neill Crowley Bridge, Cork City (formerly the George IV Bridge)

In 1898 a monument to his memory was erected at Sraharla, on the road to Kilfinane, near to Kilclooney Wood. Commemorations took place in 1967 and 2000, and a viewing platform erected in 2013.

In the 1900s, the Peter O'Neill Crowley Club was founded in Clonard, Belfast. Nicknamed "the Crowley Club", they won the Antrim Senior Hurling Championship in 1903 and 1907.

A statue of O'Neill Crowley makes up part of a monument on Grand Parade, Cork.

=== Song ===
An Irish rebel song in his honour is recorded:

As I rambled out one evening, all in the month of June,
I strayed into an old churchyard to view a noble tomb.
I overheard an old man pray as the tears rolled from his eyes,
And it’s ‘neath that cold, cold, clay today, poor Peter Crowley lies.

And the grave where Peter Crowley lies, o'er it the grass grows green,
And underneath poor Peter sleeps because he loved the green.
It grieves my heart to see you there, a hero once in bloom,
But untimely death has brought you here to fill a silent tomb.

Oh Crowley, oh Crowley come tell to me the truth:
Who went along that night with you, to Kilcloney’s this lonely one?
Who stood beside that brave old oak and fired that signal gun?
Who fought and died for Ireland’s rights, was Crowley’s only son.

So fare thee well young Crowley, so fare thee well again.
It’s many the mile we shouldered you, through storm and through gale.
It’s many the mile we shouldered you, a storín gheal mo chroí, [Irish: "bright darling of my heart"]
Because you were a Fenian boy and died for liberty.

He is also mentioned in "Erin's Lovely Lee":

Now one of them stepped up to me and asked me did I know
The green woods of Kilclooney or the Glens of Aherlow
Or could I tell where Crowley fell his native land to free
Or the tower that Captain Mackey sacked down Erin’s lovely Lee

‘Tis I can tell where Crowley fell ‘twas in Kilclooney Woods
And the tower that Captain Mackey sacked twas was by his side I stood.
When he gave the word we raised a cheer that made the tyrants frown,
Sure we raised the green flag o’er our heads, the harp without the crown.
