= Thomas Beirne (writer) =

Irish writer and activist

Thomas Beirne (born Liam Ó Beirne, fl. c. 1900) was a Roman Catholic priest, a writer of Modern literature in Irish and a language revival activist.

== Life ==
Liam Ó Beirne was born at Milltown, County Galway in August 1871 in the townland of Carrownageehy to Thomas and Bridget (née Quinn) Beirne. The local Connaught Irish vernacular was always spoken at home. Beirne attended Ballindine National school in County Mayo. After completing primary school, Beirne attended St Jarlath's College in Tuam. He then went on to join the priesthood, registering at St Patrick's College, Maynooth on 3 September 1892.

He was ordained a priest for the Tuam Archdiocese in Galway City on 19 November 1899. During the Gaelic revival, he wrote under pseudonyms An Beirneach and An Fear Mór Maoil ("The Big Bald Man"). His books An Troid agus an tUaigneas and Seo Suid won him much acclaim.

Fr. Beirne died in 1949, aged 78 years. He is buried at Kilclooney Graveyard, Milltown.

== Legacy ==
His ordination chalice, with his parents' marriage tokens affixed to it, is on display in the Milltown Heritage Centre.

In 1999, the centenary of Fr. Byrne's ordination in 1899, was celebrated in his native Milltown in recognition of the village's Irish language past. The celebration also marked the centenary of the death in New York City of fellow Milltown man, pioneering Irish language magazine editor, Philo-Celtic Society founder, and driving force behind the Gaelic revival Mícheál Ó Lócháin.

At this celebration, a wreath was laid on "An Beirneach's" grave at Kilclooney Cemetery, Milltown by his two surviving relatives. This was followed by Mass in Irish in St. Joseph's Roman Catholic Church in Milltown and a ceilidh of Irish traditional music performed by local musicians.

== Bibliography ==
- An Troid agust an tUaigneas, Mc Ghuill, 1926.
- Seo Siúd, O'Gorman, 1934.
- The Irish Speaker examined home (attributed).
