= Joe Waldron =

Irish Gaelic footballer

Personal information
- Native name: Seosamh de Bhaldraithe (Irish)
- Born: Milltown, County Galway

Sport
- Sport: Gaelic football
- Position: Left corner-back
Club
Years	Club	Apps (scores)
1968–1984	Milltown	37 Apps. (2-6)
Club titles
- Galway titles: 2
College
- Years: College
- UCD
College titles
- Sigerson titles: 1
Inter-county
- Years: County
- 1970s: Galway
Inter-county titles
- Connacht titles: 2

Joe Waldron (born 1951 in Milltown, County Galway) is an Irish former sportsman. He played Gaelic football with his local club Milltown and was a member of the Galway senior team in the 1970s.

In 1972, Waldron captained Galway to win their first All-Ireland Under-21 Football Championship when they defeated Kerry in the final. He lost two consecutive All-Ireland Senior Football Championship Finals with Galway after being beaten by Cork in 1973 and Dublin the following year in 1974. He was a member of both of Milltown's Galway Senior Football Championship winning teams in 1971 and 1981, playing alongside his brother John in both finals.

Waldron was also a part of the successful UCD team of the early 1970s, winning a Sigerson Cup in 1972/73. This was the same all-conquering University team that won the Dublin SFC, Leinster Club SFC & All-Ireland Club SFC titles in the 1973/74 season.

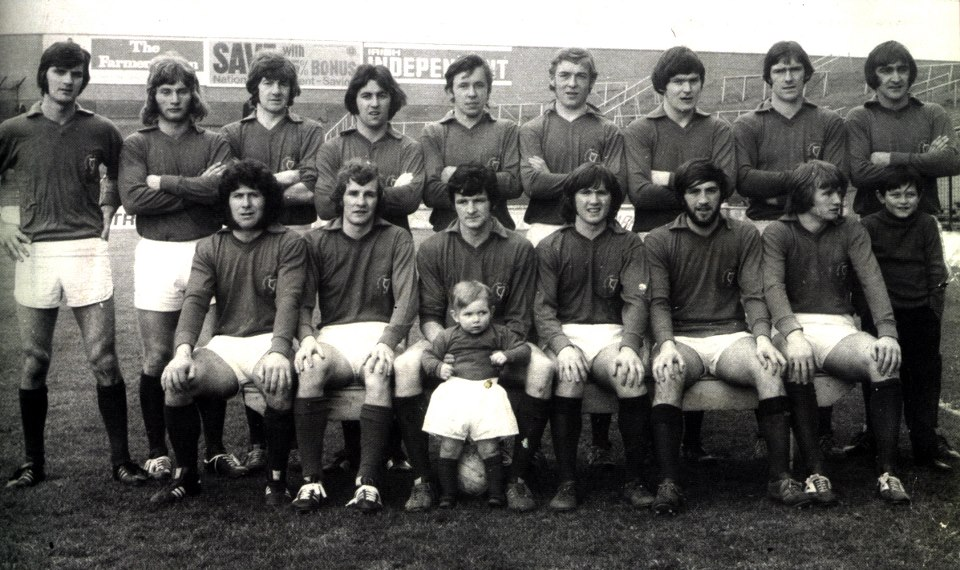
The Combined Universities Gaelic Football Team that played in the final of the GAA Inter-Provincial Championship, the Railway Cup, on 17 March 1973 at Croke Park, Dublin

On St. Patrick's Day, 1973, Waldron played on the Combined Universities football team that defeated his own native Connacht in the Railway Cup final, the only Universities team to win the Inter-Provincial Championship in football or hurling.

Waldron served as a selector for the Galway senior team in the early 1990s under John Tobin's management term.

== Honours ==
Galway

- Connacht Minor Football Championship : 1 (1969)
- Connacht Under-21 Football Championship : 1 (1972; capt.)
- All-Ireland Under 21 Football Championship : 1 (1972; capt.)
- Connacht Senior Football Championship : 2 (1973, 1974)

Milltown

- Galway Senior Football Championship : 2 (1971, 1981)
  - Runner-up : 1 (1978)
- Connacht Senior Club Football Championship Runner-up : 1 (1971)

UCD

- Sigerson Cup : 1 (1972/73)
- Dublin Senior Football Championship : 1 (1973)
- Leinster Senior Club Football Championship : 1 (1973)
- All-Ireland Senior Club Football Championship : 1 (1973/74)

Combined Universities

- Railway Cup : 1 (1973)
