= Val Noone =

Australian historian

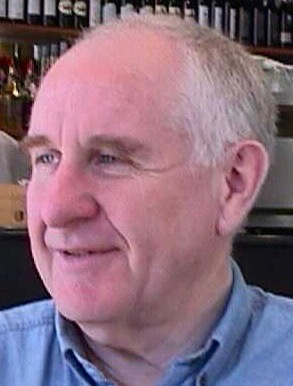
- Dr Val Noone is an author, social activist and a specialist historian of Irish Immigration into Victoria, Australia.
- Born: Melbourne, Victoria
- Spouse: Mary Doyle
- Children: Michael Noone, Catherine Noone
- Awards: Medal of the Order of Australia (2009)

Academic background
- Education: Corpus Christi College (CCC)(Werribee):Philosophy and Theology: La Trobe University, Melbourne (doctorate)

Academic work
- Discipline: historian
- Sub-discipline: history of Irish emigration, The Irish language, Catholics and Christians: questions of war and peace. Catholic and Christians: Moral question of social justice
- Notable works: Disturbing the War: Dorothy Day in Australia Hidden Ireland in Victoria

Valentine Gabriel Noone (born 9 May 1940) is an Australian writer-editor, historian, social activist and academic. He is a recognised authority on Irish emigration to Australia, especially Victoria, since the time of the great Irish Famine (1845-1852). Noone has a particular interest in the history of the Irish language in Australia, its preservation, and the understanding of its social, cultural and linguistic aspects.

He is an Honorary Fellow of the School of Historical and Philosophical Studies at the University of Melbourne. He was awarded a medal of the Order of Australia in June 2009. In 2013 the Senate of the National University of Ireland (NUI) in Dublin conferred on him the degree of Doctor of Literature, honoris causa, for his contribution to Irish Studies in Australia.

== Formative education ==
In 1955, aged 15, Val Noone was specially chosen to represent Victoria in the Sun Advertiser Youth Travel Group, dubbed "Australia's Schoolboy Ambassadors" which involved an educational journey to parts of the Middle East, Europe, and Great Britain.

In 1957, at the age of almost seventeen, Val Noone began his seminary studies for the Catholic priesthood at Corpus Christi College at Werribee, a suburb on the southern outskirts of Melbourne.

Noone spent eight years (1957–1964) at this college and experienced the last years of a dedicated way of life and training regimen.

He was required to participate in a program of cooperative manual labor somewhat akin to the ancient monastic Rule of St Benedict. Students were required to tend gardens and farm work, carry out maintenance normally performed by tradesmen, and a variety of other tasks which ensured the smooth and efficient running of the college as a religious community.

Partly because of the nature of his intended vocation, and partly because the intellectual turbulence of the 1950s and 1960s, Noone, though officially studying scholastic philosophy and theology, found himself grappling with other issues.

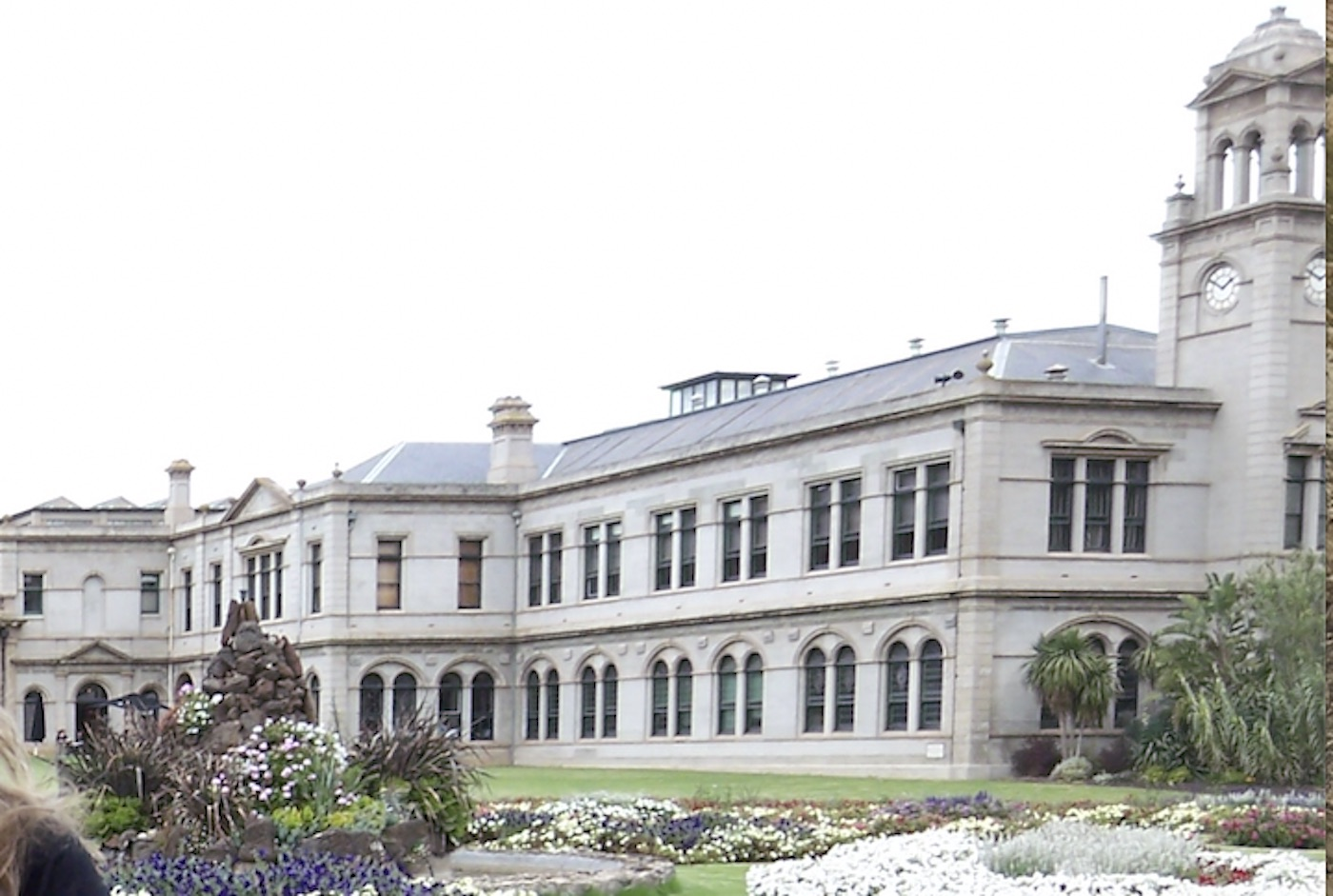
Corpus Christi College, Werribee, Victoria

These formative questions included the embedded Catholic fear of communism, the anti-social nature of extreme capitalism, the changes seen as needed within the Catholic church, the plight of Australian aborigines, the White Australia policy, the Catholic support of the National Civic Council, the division of Catholics within the Australian Labor Party, and the universal consternation and angst of possible Nuclear warfare.

During these eight years Noone studied and achieved tertiary qualifications in Biblical studies, as well as philosophy and theology.

== The Catholic Church: the 1960s ==
Following his ordination to the priesthood, Noone involved himself in pastoral work in various churches in the Melbourne Archdiocese.

In the mid-1960s, Noone was appointed assistant priest to Con Reis, the parish priest of St Albans. In the turmoil and change of the 1960s Noone found himself, in addition to his normal priestly duties, challenged by a range of social and moral issues. At the time the Catholic-pervaded Australian Labor Party experienced a serious division which led to the offshoot Democratic Labor Party. There were bitterly opposing views about support for General Franco in the Spanish Civil War. Some Catholics were passionately advocating rural alternative living as antidote to the evils of capitalism. There was serious moral argument and angst about the indiscriminate atomic bombing of Hiroshima and Nagasaki. Above all there was a fearful consciousness of the nuclear arms race and the possibility of world annihilation.

In May 1968, Noone was assistant priest in the parish of Frankston. His shocked reaction to the papal encyclical Humanae Vitae (On Human Life) and his disagreement with his archbishop, James Knox, was leading to a personal crisis.

With fellow priest Garry McLoughlin, Noone had founded an independent magazine for priests and ex-priests entitled "Priests Forum". Its articles were an expression of radicalism and an attempt at reform within the Catholic Church. This rise of critical thought was clearly stimulated by the Second Vatican Council, which had highlighted a broad range of issues which the Catholic Church had to face.

In May 1970, Noone and McLoughlin were instrumental in organising a national meeting of priests in Coogee, a beachside suburb of Sydney. They hoped this conference would discuss some of the burning issues of the day, namely the War in Vietnam, the question of priestly celibacy and the imposition of birth control on married Catholics. These controversial issues did not get much traction due to the resistance of conservatives. It was, however, considered a beginning at some level.An important outcome of the Coogee Conference was the formation of a National Conference of Australian priests. This took place in Sydney in 1970 with the participation of 400 priests from all over Australia. This National Conference of Priests was still active in 2020.

Noone and McLoughlin, on their return to Melbourne, became openly critical of their own Archbishop James Knox and his support for the Vietnam War. Shortly after, Val Noone requested leave from the priesthood and after several months returned to life as a private citizen and anti-war activist.

== Post priesthood: life as a private citizen ==
=== "House of Hospitality" ===
On leaving the catholic ministry, Val Noone became involved with a group of dynamic and idealistic young Catholics who, in the inner city Melbourne suburb of Fitzroy, informally practised community living, voluntary poverty, and open house hospitality including the provision of caring accommodation for homeless men. The original instigators of this house in June 1969 were Val Noone's brother, Brian Noone, a former worker for the Salvation Army, and Mary Doyle, a social worker who had been assisting alcoholics. It was also home for Vietnam War Draft Resisters during the time of opposition to the Vietnam War. These included Michael Hammill-Green, Tony Dalton, Merv Langford, John Wallen and Roger Naphthine. Noone and Doyle risked imprisonment themselves by harbouring fugitives from the law in Victoria and from other states.

Insiders began referring to it as the “house of hospitality”, a reference to the Catholic Worker Movement in New York. It continued for seven and half years.

=== Australian tour of Dorothy Day ===
In late 1970, Noone closely assisted in the organisation of the Australian tour of the New York-based catholic social reformer and peace radical, Dorothy Day, organised by Roger Pryke. While in Melbourne Val Noone and his associates arranged an address by Dorothy Day on the American Catholic Worker movement at Melbourne University. Noone also assisted in the organising of the Sydney Town Hall meeting of Vietnam Moratorium Supporters convened by Dr Jim Cairns and featuring discourses by Dorothy Day and her companion Eileen Egan. In 1976 Noone and Doyle visited Dorothy Day in New York. They freely acknowledge the Catholic Worker movement as being a major inspirational influence on their personal lives.

=== Work, marriage and study ===
From 1970, Val Noone earned his living as a driver, builder's labourer, and later a proof-reader at the Melbourne Age. Val Noone married Mary Doyle in 1974.

After several years of study he achieved a doctorate in the Humanities at La Trobe University on religious attitudes to war. Noone then became a lecturer at Victoria University. During this time he was active in Australian-Irish affairs. He wrote extensively on Australian religious and political issues particularly as convenor of the Melbourne Irish Famine Commemoration committee and as founding editor of Táin, a magazine of Australian Irish affairs, which ceased publication in 2007 and was succeeded by Tinteán, published by the Australian Irish Heritage Network.

== Publications ==
He has published many books, articles and reviews, and has been a co-contributor to historical articles in Irish published by the Irish journal Feasta. He is a member of the Irish Language Association of Australia. Two of his most notable works is Hidden Ireland in Victoria, an overview of the history of the Irish language in the State of Victoria, Australia, and Dorothy Day in Australia, an historical memoir of the American peace activist's visit to Australia at the time of widespread protests to the war in Vietnam.(see publications below).

== Selected publications ==
- Noone, Val; Michael Davitt, Melbourne and the Labour Movement, in the Australian Journal of Irish Studies, Vol. 6, pp 25-42
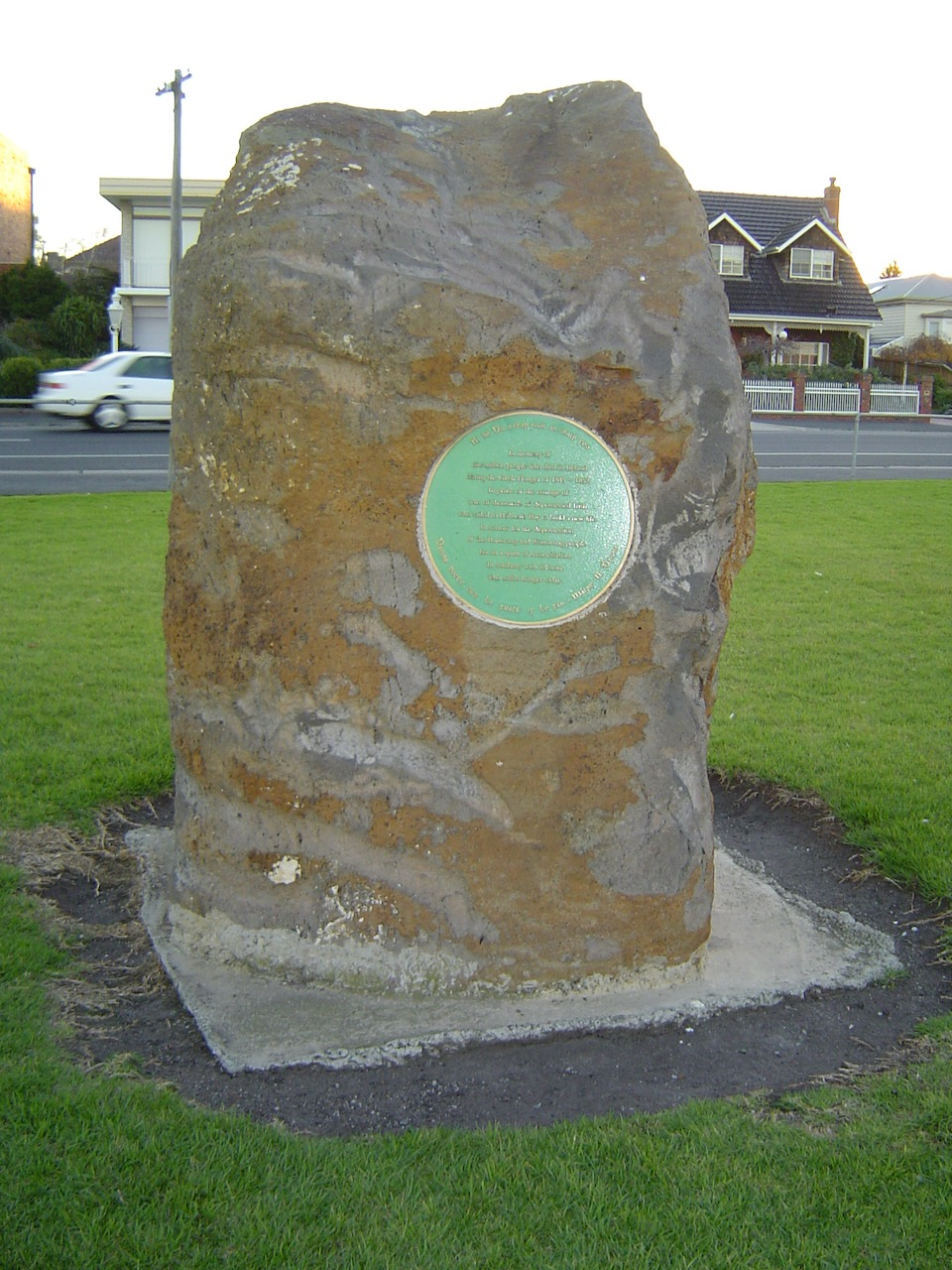
  Val Noone was chair of the committee which erected the monument to the Irish famine at the Burgoyne Reserve, Williamstown, Victoria: The inscription reads: In memory of one million people who died in Ireland during the Great Hunger of 1845–1852. In praise of the courage of tens of thousands of dispossessed Irish who sailed to Hobson's Bay to build a new life. In sorrow for the dispossession of the Bunurong and Woiworong people but in a spirit of reconciliation. In solidarity with all those who suffer hunger today.
- Noone, Val;Melbourne and the Irish Famine, Irish Famine Commemoration Committee, Melbourne, 6 December 1998 (Booklet)The booklet refers to a monument which is situated in the Burgoyne Reserve, the Strand, Williamstown, Vic.
- Noone, Val; Printers and New Technology around 1980: an Age Proof Reader's View in The Time of Their Lives - The Eight Day and Working Life, J. Kimber, P. Love (eds.), Australian Society for the Study of Labour History (Canberra) 2007
- 'Ór agus Adhmad: Éireannaigh Bungaree' (with Mary Doyle and Colin Ryan) in Feasta, Márta 2012.
- Noone, Val; An Irish Rebel in Victoria: Charles Gavan Duffy, Selectors, Squatters and Aborigines in Echoes of Irish Australia - Rebellion to Republic, J. Brownrigg, C. Mongan, R. Reid (eds.), National Library of Australia (Canberra) 2007
- 'Nioclás Ó Domhnaill: Laoch na Gaeilge san Astráil' (with Colin Ryan) in Feasta, Bealtaine 2009
- Noone, Val (editor), Celebrating Freedom of Speech: Fiftieth anniversary of the 1968 papal ban on birth control (the encyclical Humanae Vitae), North Melbourne, 6 October 2019, Publishers: Val Noone, Robert Crotty, Des Cahill, Joe Broderick, Michael Costigan, page 5
- Noone, Val, Disturbing the War: Melbourne Catholics and Vietnam, Melbourne, Spectrum, 1993 ISBN 0 86 786 127 4
- Noone, Val (editor and continuity), Nicholas O'Donnell's Autobiography, Ballarat Heritage Services, Bakery Hill Vic; 2017. ISBN 978-1-876478-32-2
- Noone, Val; Santamaria, War and Christianity: in Ormonde, Paul (editor), Santamaria - The Politics of Fear, Spectrum publications, Richmond, Victoria; 2000 ISBN 0 86786 294 7
- Noone, Val and Naughton, Rachel; Daniel Mannix : His Legacy; Melbourne Diocesan Historical Commission, Catholic Archdiocese of Melbourne, East Melbourne, Vic.2014 ISBN 978-0-646-59698-3
- Noone, Val,Hidden Ireland in Victoria, Ballarat Heritage Services, Ballarat, 2012 ISBN 978 1 876478 83 4
- Noone, Val (ed) with Terry Blake, Mary Doyle and Helen Praetz, Golden Years: Grounds for Hope:Father Golden and the Newman Society 1950-1966; Published by Golden Project, East Burwood. 2008 ISBN 978-0-646-50478-0
- Noone, Val, From Roscrea to Beagle Bay: Dan O’Donovan, priest and hermit; Published by Mary Doyle & Val Noone, Fitzroy, 2020 ISBN 978-0-646-81475-9 (paperback)
- Noone, Val, Dorothy Day in Australia; Mary Doyle and Val Noone, Box 51, Fitzroy, Vic 2020 ISBN 978-0-646-82088-0
