= Risteard Ó Foghludha =

Irish teacher, journalist and editor

- Born: Richard Foley; 5 March 1871; Cnoc Chonaill Aodha, County Cork, Ireland
- Died: 20 August 1957 (aged 86); Dublin, County Dublin, Ireland
- Education: National University of ireland
- Occupations: Teacher, journalist, writer
- Spouse: Eily Barnes
- Writing career
- Pen name: Fiachra Éilgeach
- Genre: Munster Gaelic poetry
- Notable works: Logainmneacha i. Dictionary of Irish Place-names (7,000), English-Gaelic.
- Literary movement: Gaelic League

Risteard Ó Foghludha (5 March 1871 – 20 August 1957) was an Irish-language teacher, journalist and editor from near Youghal, County Cork.

== Early life ==
His father Richard (1830–1910) was a farmer and Margaret (Peg) Long was his mother. He was the oldest of seven girls and five boys. Both his parents were native Irish speakers. He won a prize when at the Christian Brothers school in Youghal in the Irish language. He dedicated his first literary work Carn Tighearnaigh (1938) to Máirtín Ó Buadhacháin from Youghal, the first person who taught him to read and write in the Irish language.(" do Mháirtín Ó Buadhacháin in Eochaill, don té do chéad-thug teagasc dam i léigheamh agus i scríobhadh ár dteangadh dúthchais.")

== Work ==
Later on, he moved to Dublin, around the year 1888. It is likely that he spent two years working in the Royal Dublin Society, in Leinster House at the time, and at this time he started learning shorthand. He became a reporter for the Freeman's Journal, in the early 1890s. It claimed that he was charged with reporting the last speech of Charles Stuart Parnell, made in Creaga, County Galway, on 27 September 1891. He spent eight years in England working with wholesale typing machines and returned to Dublin at the beginning of the 20th century. While in England he started selling Underwood Typewriter Company. This Company sent him back to Ireland at the beginning of the 20th. century. Until 1905 Underwoods did not have an office in Dublin and Ó Foghludha spent long periods in Belfast, but went back to Dublin at the weekend. He was teaching in Blackrock College, between the years 1905–07.

He founded a branch of the Gaelic League (Conradh na Gaeilge) 'Craobh an Chéitinnigh' in 1901, along with Seosamh Ó Tórna (Tórna), Seán Ó Cuív and Seán Ó Ceallaigh. He chose the motto for the Craobh (Branch) 'Múscail do mhisneach, a Bhanba' (Awaken your courage, Banba (Ireland)) and served as its honorary secretary for nine years.

== Personal life ==
Ó Foghludha married Eily Barnes (born in Ranelagh in 1884) in June 1910. They had one son, Garrett.

== Literary works ==
On 17 August 1901 he published his first work of prose in An Claidheamh Soluis, using the pseudonym 'An Corcaigheach Macánta' (The honest Corkonian). He first used the pseudonym 'Fiachra Éilgeach' whilst in Lough Leane, in November 1903.

He spent most of his life's work in the editing of the work of the best poets in Munster Irish: Piaras Mac Gearailt (1905), Donnchadh Ruadh Mac Conmara (1908, 1933), Brian Merriman (1912, 1949), Tadhg Gaelach Ó Súilleabháin (1929), Pádraig Phiarais Cúndún (1932), Seán Clárach Mac Domhnaill (1932), Liam Dall Ó hIfearnáin (1939), Eoghan Rua Ó Súilleabháin (1937), Liam Inglis (1937), Pádraig Denn (1942), Liam Rua Mac Coitir (1937), Eoghan an Mhéirín Mac Carrthaigh (1938), An tAthair Conchubhar Ó Briain (1938), Éamonn de bhFál (1946), Filí na Máighe ( The Maigue Poets) (1952).

In 1935, Brown and Nolan published his 'Dictionary of Irish Place-names'. He published other titles as well; Saol-ré Sheathrúin Céitinn, 1908; Imeachtaí an Oireachtais, Sgéalta triúir, 1919; Scoth-duanta, 1933; Duanarán ré 1600–1700, 1935; Mil na hÉigse, 1945; an seach-chló Cath Chnoic na nOs. He also edited other works; Seod-aistí as Conamara, 1943 by Peadar Neilí Ó Domhnaill. Fíoraon le fiarán,(Leo Tolstoy); An Béar, 1923 (Anton Chekhov); Ag Suirghe leis an mBaintreach, 1927 (The Courting of the Widow Malone by Constance P. Anderson); Fiche gearrscéal ar na thionntódh as an bhFraingcis ( 20 short stories translated from French,) 1930; Naoi ngearra-chluichí ar n-a thionntódh by Fiachra Éilgeach, 1930; Maria Chapdelaine, 1933 (Louis Hemon); Cnósach gearr-scéal. Ar n-a dtionntódh ón bhFraingcis, 1934; An Phíb fé sna bántaibh, 1933 (The Pipe in the fields le T.C. Murray); Oilibhéar Dubh, 1935 (the drama Black Oliver by John Guinan); An Bheidhlín Buadha, 1935 (François Coppée); An Sárúchán, 1935 (The Lifting le John Brandane); Eoinín Bocht, 1942 (El Pobrecito Juan le Gregorio Martinez Sierra). Tiarnaí deireanacha Urmhún (1956), translation of The Last Lords of Ormond by Dermot F. Gleason.

Ó Foghludha held the position of manager in the company 'Underwood Typewriter Co. ", at 5 Leinster Street, up to April 1936 when he started working for An Gúm. For a period, he was editor at 'Brown and Nolan' before Éamon de Valera appointed him to Coimisiún na Logainmneacha (The Placenames Commission) in the year 1946. He was appointed editor of the translation of the Constitution of Ireland on 11 November 1936.

Risteard Ó Foghludha died on 20 August 1957. On 25 August 1974, Tom O'Donnell, Minister for the Gaeltacht, unveiled a plaque on the house where he was born and where his relatives still live. A local primary school is named Scoil Fhiachra Éilgeach in his honour. The National University of Ireland awarded him D. Litt. Celt. it in 1939.
