= Dunmore (barony) =

Dunmore Dún Mór (Irish)
- Barony
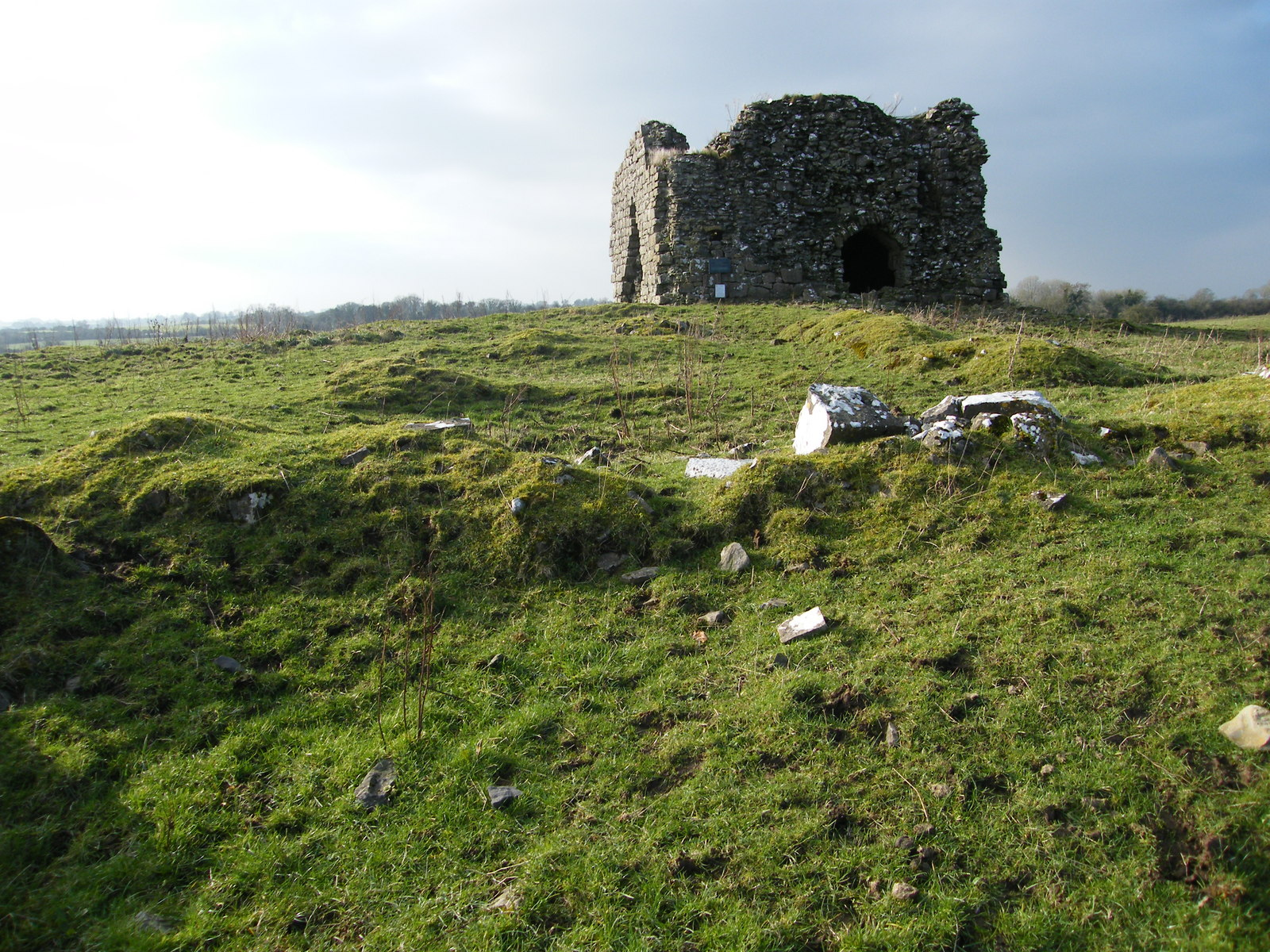
- Kilclooney Castle

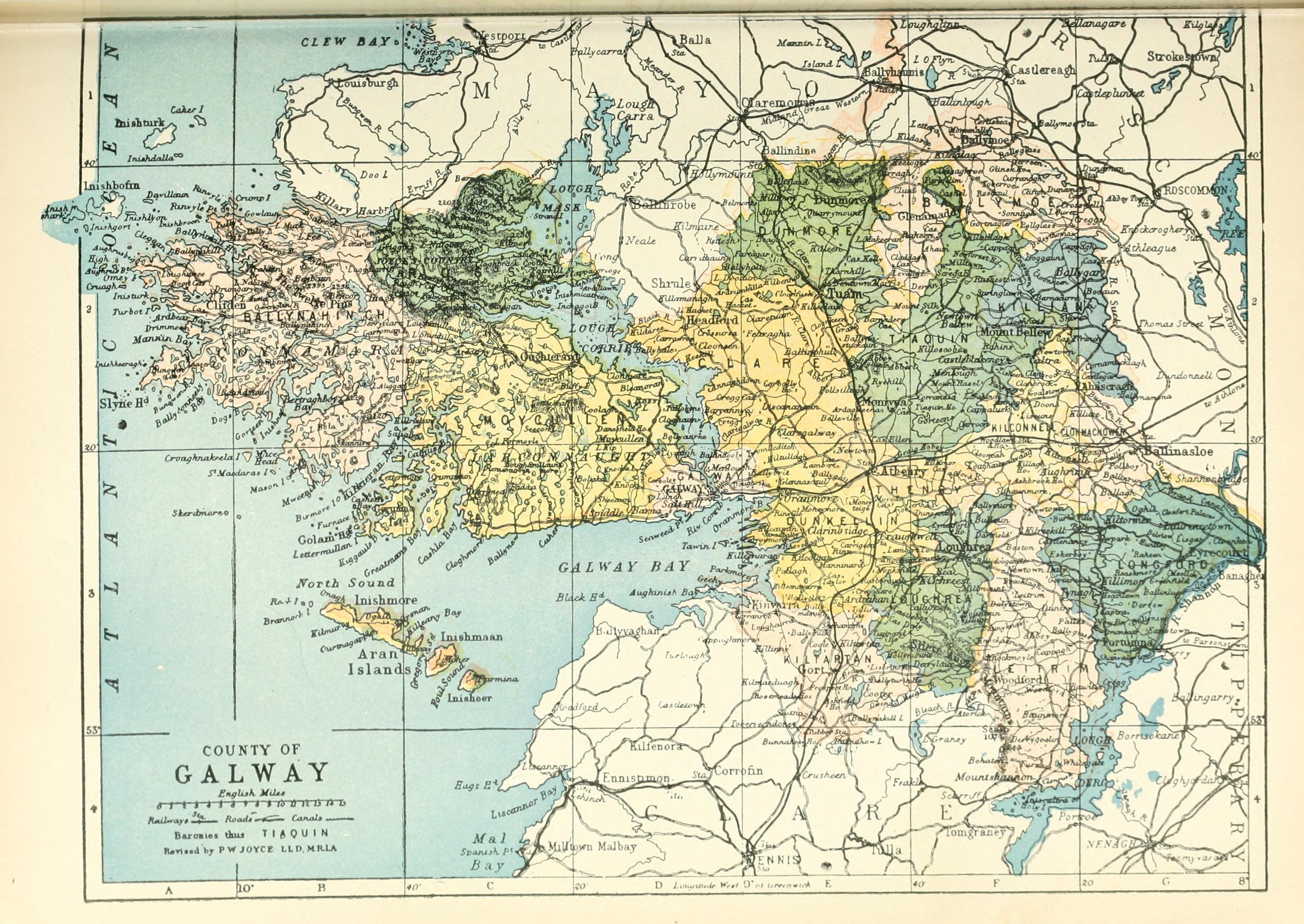
- Barony map of County Galway, 1900; Dunmore is in the north, coloured green.

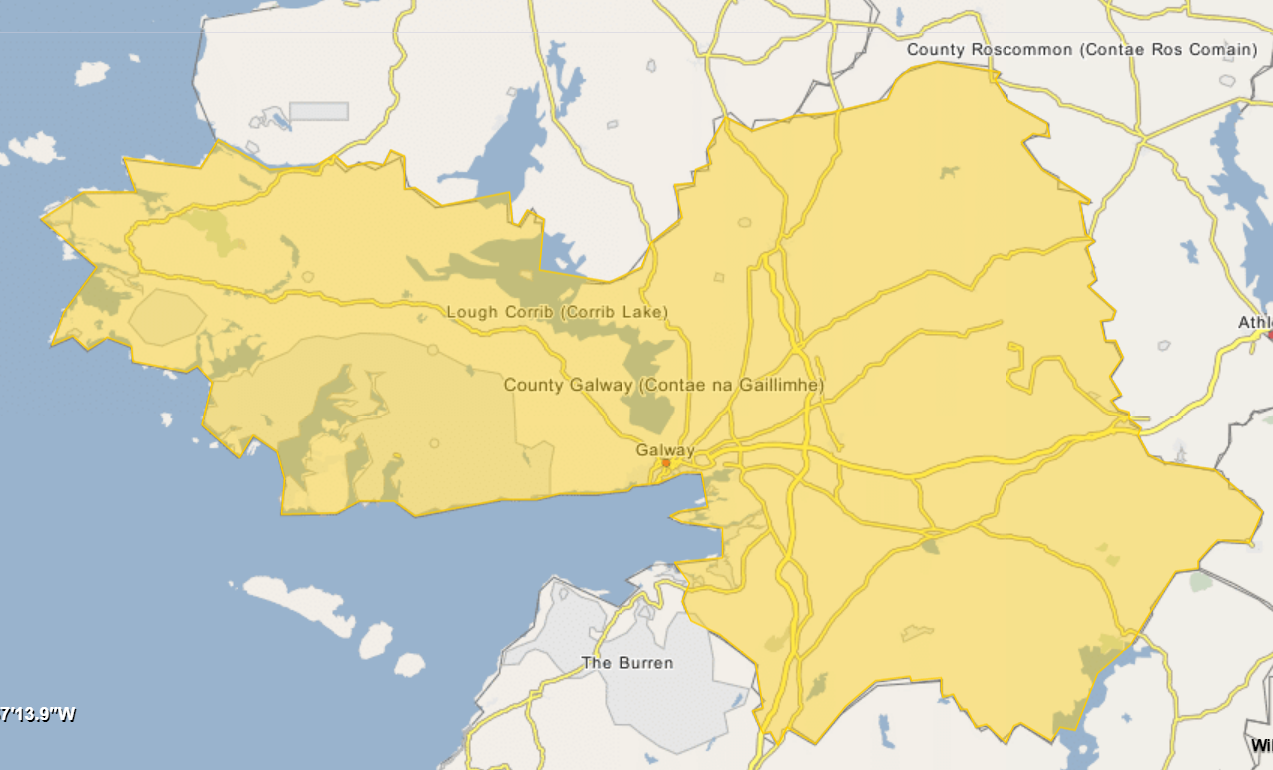
- Location within County Galway
- Coordinates: 53°35′N 8°51′W
- Sovereign state: Ireland
- Province: Connacht
- County: Galway

Area
  - Total: 288.2 km^{2} (111.3 sq mi)

Dunmore (Irish: Dún Mór, lit. 'a great fort') is a barony in County Galway, Ireland.

== Etymology ==
Dunmore literally means "great fort". It gave its name to the Conmaicne Dúin Móir ("Conmaicne of Dunmore"), originally Cenél Dubáin.

== Location ==
Dunmore barony is situated in north of County Galway, directly south of county Mayo.

== History ==
Dunmore barony was part of the ancient tuath of Conmaicne Dúin Móir, one of the original Connacht tribes.

== List of parishes ==
Below is the list of parishes in Dunmore barony:

- Addergoole
- Dunmore
- Kilbennan
- Kilconla
- Killererin
- Liskeevy
- Tuam

== See also ==
- Conmaicne Dúin Móir
- Dunmore, County Galway
