= Inishfarnard =

Island in County Cork, Ireland

Native name: Inis Fearn Ard
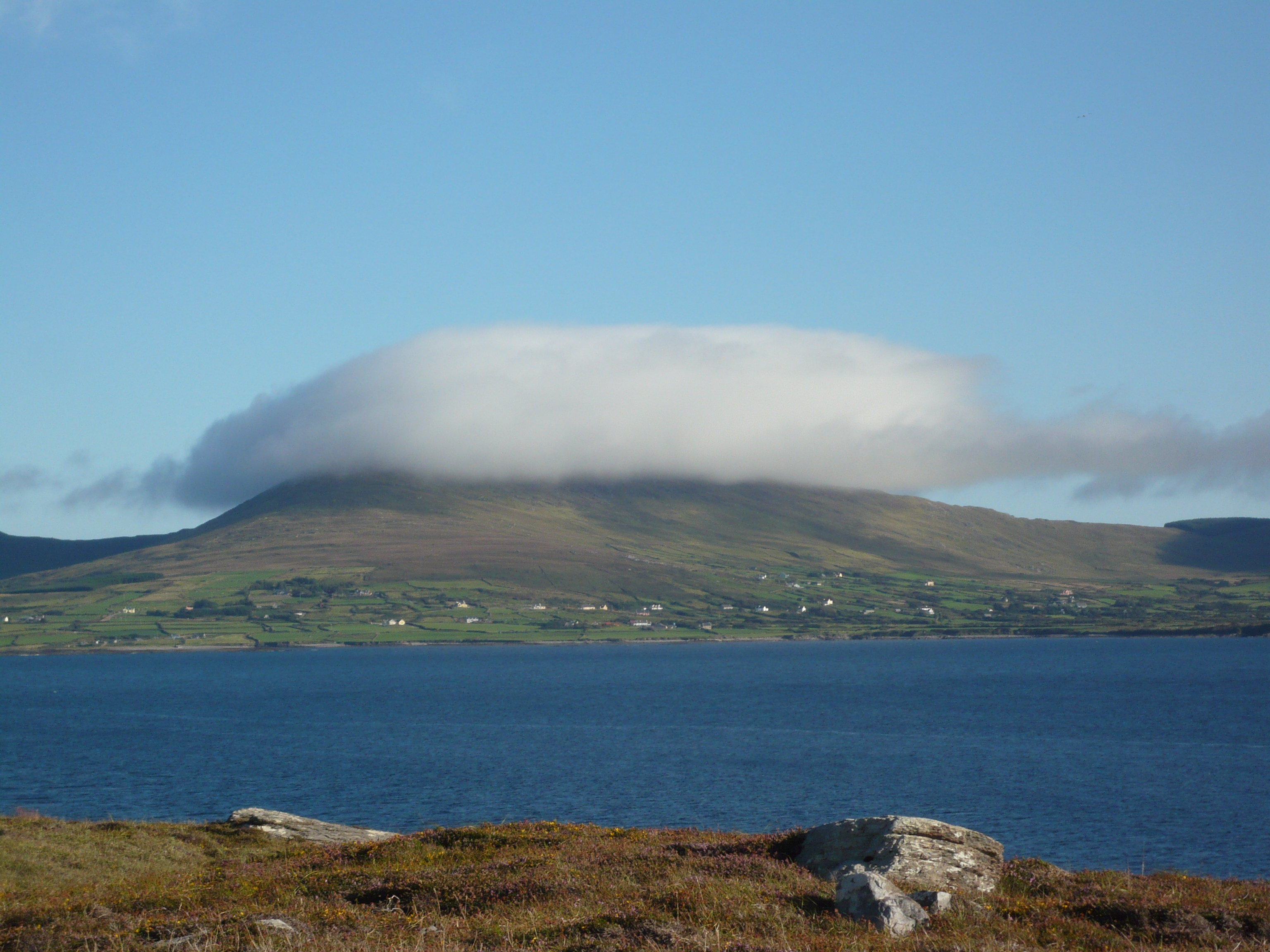
- Panoramic view

- Location within island of Ireland

Geography
- Location: Atlantic Ocean
- Coordinates: 51°42′38.4″N 10°1′32.2″W
- Area: 0.3296 km^{2} (0.1273 sq mi)
- Highest elevation: 45.1 m (148 ft)

Administration
- Ireland
- Province: Munster
- County: Cork

Demographics
- Population: 0

Inishfarnard (Irish: Inis Fearn Ard) meaning Island of the tall fern is a small island and a townland off Kilcatherine Point, in County Cork, Ireland.

== Geography ==
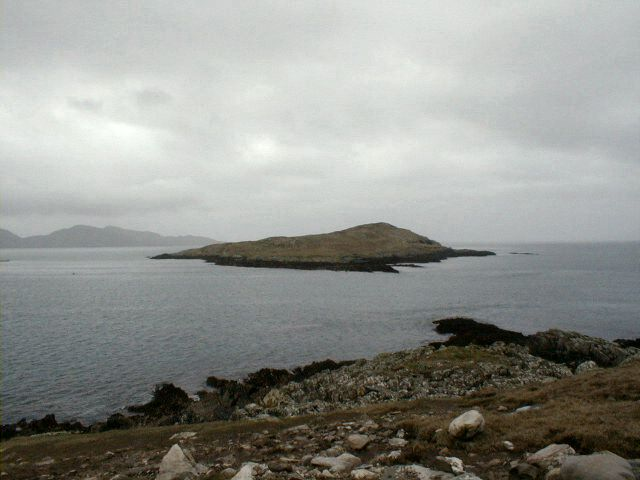
The island seen from Kilcatherine Point

Near the northern tip of the island there are pleasant cliffs; the best landing place for boats (not suitable for kayaks) is located on the SE side of the island, near a fish farm. Freshwater, which was once available on the island, cannot be found anymore.

== History ==
A small community of 24 used to live on the island, which is now uninhabited, with its old houses abandoned as well as the neighbouring fields.

== Fishing ==
Inishfarnard is considered a good place for fishing. A fish farm now operates in the waters on the southeast of the island, it is operated by Mowi.

== See also ==
- List of islands of Ireland
