= Glór na nGael =

Irish Organization

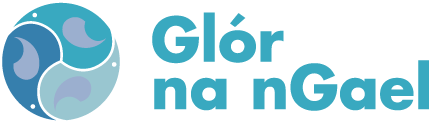
- Formation: 1961; 65 years ago
- Type: Irish language development organisation
- Headquarters: Ráth Chairn with offices in Gaoth Dobhair and Belfast
- Region served: Ireland
- Official language: Irish
- CEO: Lorcán Mac Gabhann
- Main organ: Board of directors
- Staff: 24
- Website: Glór na nGael

Glór na nGael (Irish pronunciation: [ˈɡl̪ˠoːɾˠ n̪ˠə ˈŋeːl̪ˠ]; "voice of the Gaels") is an Irish-language lead organisation funded by Foras na Gaeilge which promotes and supports Irish in three sectors: the family, community development, and business. It was established as an Irish language community group competition in 1961, and Cardinal Tomás Ó Fiaich and Monsignor Pádraig Ó Fiannachta were among its founders.

== Competition ==
The Comórtas Ghlór na nGael competition includes a prize fund of over €80,000 with themes encompassing several aspects of community life. The organisation presents several special awards on an annual basis. Glór na nGael's adjudication groups visit each committee towards the end of the year to assess the progress made and award marks towards the competition. A written report is provided to each committee detailing their progress and providing any further advice or recommendations.

Glór na nGael Trophy winners 1962 – present

- 1962 Mainistir na Féile, County Limerick
- 1963 Mainistir na Féile, County Limerick
- 1964 Baile Átha Luain, County Westmeath
- 1965 Durlas, County Tipperary
- 1966 Durlas, County Tipperary
- 1967 Oileán Chléire, County Cork
- 1968 Drom Collachair, County Limerick
- 1969 Bré, County Wicklow
- 1970 Dún Garbhán, County Waterford
- 1971 Baile Mhúirne/Cúil Aodha, County Cork
- 1972 Caisleán a’ Bharraigh, County Mayo
- 1973 Clochán Bhréanainn, County Kerry
- 1974 Eochaill, County Cork
- 1975 Clár Chlainne Mhuiris, County Mayo
- 1976 Teampall an Ghleanntáin, County Limerick
- 1977 Dúiche Chrónáin, County Dublin
- 1978 An tÁth Leacach, County Limerick
- 1979 Baile Munna, Dublin
- 1980 Trá Lí, County Kerry
- 1981 An Daingean, County Kerry
- 1982 Ceatharlach, County Carlow
- 1983 Inis, County Clare
- 1984 Baile an Easpaig, County Cork
- 1985 Ráth Chairn, County Meath
- 1986 Béal Feirste Thiar, Belfast
- 1987 Tamhlacht, County Dublin
- 1988 Paróiste an Chnoic, County Galway
- 1989 Dúiche Chrónáin, County Dublin
- 1990 Inis, County Clare
- 1991 Fionntrá, County Kerry
- 1992 Doire, Derry
- 1993 Carna, County Galway
- 1994 Ceantar Naithí, County Dublin
- 1995 Ceatharlach, County Carlow
- 1996 Béal Feirste Thiar, Belfast
- 1997 An tAonach, County Tipperary
- 1998 Ráth Chairn, County Meath
- 1999 Doire, Derry
- 2000 Paróiste an Chnoic, County Galway
- 2001 Inis Oírr, County Galway
- 2002 Inis, County Clare
- 2003 Cumann Cultúrtha Mhic Reachtain, Tuaisceart Bhéal Feirste, Belfast
- 2004 Trá Lí, County Kerry
- 2005 An Droichead, Deisceart Bhéal Feirste, Belfast
- 2006 Paróiste an Chnoic, County Galway
- 2007 An Clár as Gaeilge, Inis, County Clare
- 2008 Comharchumann Forbartha Ghaoth Dobhair, County Donegal
- 2009 An Droichead, Béal Feirste, Belfast
- 2010 Glór Charn Tóchair, Machaire Rátha, County Londonderry
- 2011 Gaelphobal an tSrátha Báin, County Tyrone
- 2012 Ionad Naomh Pádraig, Dobhar, County Donegal
- 2013 Comharchumann Mhic Dara, An Cheathrú Rua, County Galway
- 2014 Glór Charn Tóchair, Machaire Rátha, County Londonderry
- 2015 Cultúrlann Uí Chanáin, Doire, County Londonderry
- 2016 Cumann Forbartha Chois Fharraige, County Galway
- 2017 Glór na Móna, Béal Feirste, Belfast
- 2018 Áislann Rann na Feirste, Dobhar, County Donegal
- 2019 Cultúrlann McAdam Ó Fiaich, Béal Feirste, Belfast
- 2020 Coiste Forbartha Charn Tóchair, County Londonderry
- 2021 Comharchumann Mhic Dara, An Cheathrú Rua, County Galway
- 2022 Ionad Naomh Padraig, Dobhar, County Donegal
- 2023 Oidhreacht Chorcha Dhuibhne, County Kerry

== Fondúireacht Sheosaimh Mhic Dhonncha ==
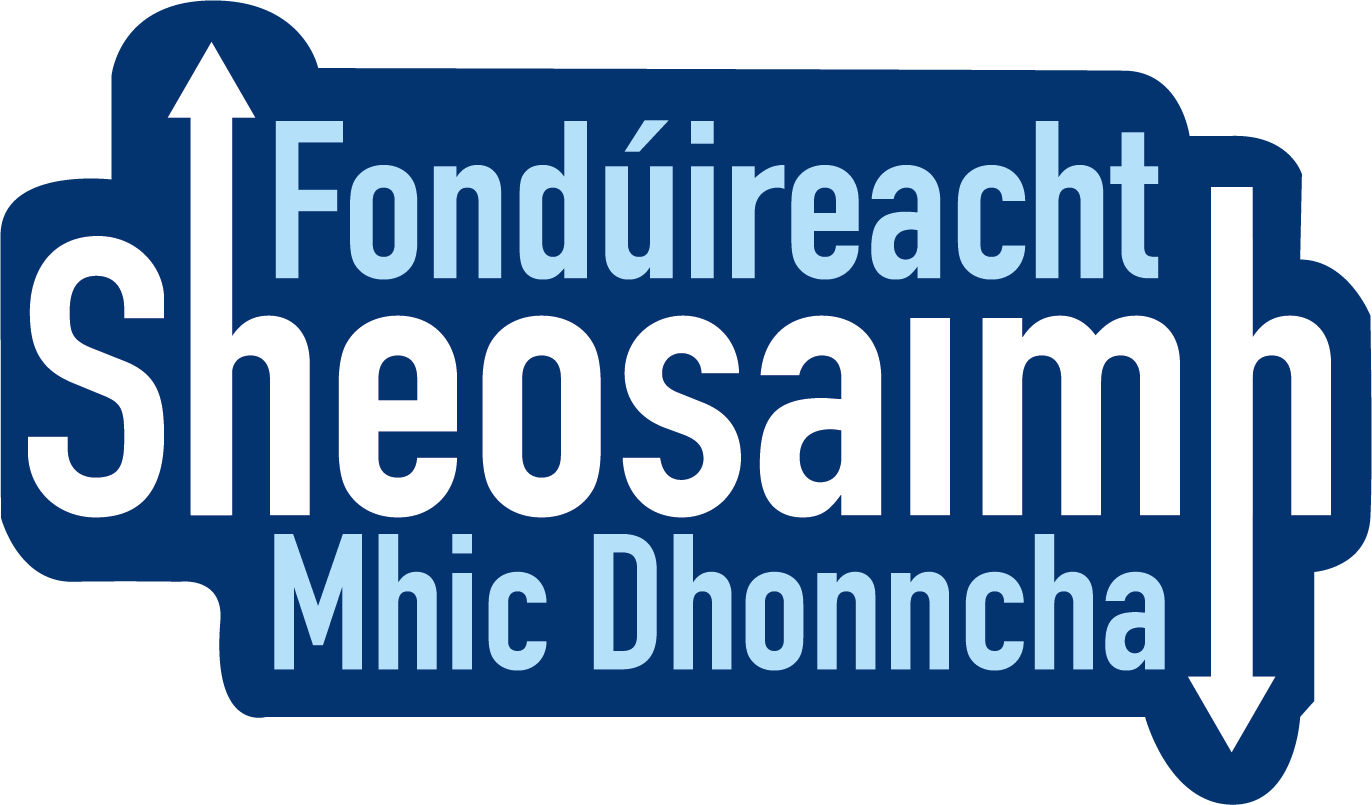

Fondúireacht Sheosaimh Mhic Dhonncha ("Joe McDonagh Foundation" in English) is a support scheme of the Gaelic Athletic Association (GAA) and Glór na nGael which is aimed at GAA clubs that are engaged in the promotion of the Irish language. The scheme is administered by Glór na nGael in collaboration with the GAA National Committee.

The foundation was named in honour of Joe McDonagh, a former president of the Gaelic Athletic Association and chief executive of Foras na Gaeilge.

The purpose of the foundation is to recognise and support the work done by GAA clubs. Bronze, silver and gold medals are awarded to clubs at the end of the year – depending on the number of goals set by the foundation that clubs have achieved.

== Irish language games ==
Glór na nGael is the Irish publisher of the Scrabble and Junior Scrabble word games, and in 2015 it also published the Irish-language version of the Monopoly board game. It has also published the Irish language version of Cluedo and Monopoly Junior which was launched as part of Lá Spraoi na Gaeilge 2024 in Letterkenny.
