= Irish Language Association of Australia =

The Irish Language Association of Australia (Irish: Cumann Gaeilge na hAstráile) was formally registered as a legal entity on 7 May 1993 in order to further the use of the Irish language in south-eastern Australia and organise weekly gatherings for conversation or classes in Melbourne, Victoria. The Association also runs a yearly Irish language summer school - Gaeltacht Melbourne (formerly known as Daonscoil Victoria).

The Association had its origins in various Irish language classes run in the inner suburbs of Melbourne in the 1980s, supplemented by an Irish language program broadcast by the Special Broadcasting Service. The demand for regular classes led to the founding of the Association in 1992.

== Aims ==
The chief aims of the Association are to encourage people to learn Irish and to create an Irish-speaking community in Australia.

Its long-term aim is to have the Irish language included as an official subject in the Victorian secondary school curriculum and to encourage the teaching of the language at tertiary level as a unit for a BA in Irish Studies.

== Venues ==
After trying several venues, the Association's business was done for many years at the Celtic Club until its sale in 2017 and then at the Celtic Club office until the arrival of the COVID-19 virus in early 2020. The office itself was also closed at the beginning of 2021.

During the COVID-19 pandemic, classes moved online and three classes are still running on Zoom in 2024. After restrictions were lifted, in-person classes also resumed at a new venue: the Kathleen Syme Library and Community Centre in Carlton.

The association's library has been in storage and inaccessible to members since 2017.

== Summer School ==
The first Irish language summer school in Victoria (later called Daonscoil Victoria) was held in November 1995; a New South Wales school having started in January 1993. It was held for many years in January in a forest site close to Bacchus Marsh, and had an average attendance of 50 students, with language classes supplemented by music, dancing and singing.

=== Gaeltacht Melbourne ===
In January 2018, the Daonscoil resumed after a break, moving to an urban setting at International House, a residential college of the University of Melbourne. In 2019 the Daonscoil was renamed Gaeltacht Melbourne.

The summer school was not run in 2021 because of COVID-19 and it will not return before 2026.
