= An Gael =

American magazine in the Irish language

An Gael is a quarterly literary magazine in the Irish language, published in the United States on behalf of the Philo-Celtic Society. It describes itself as international and was established in 2009 by Séamas Ó Neachtain, who is its editor. The magazine is based in New York City.

The lineage of the magazine can be traced back to An Gaodhal, which was published as a bilingual journal in Irish and English from 1881 to 1904 on behalf of the Society, and revived intermittently between then and 2009. Its re-establishment in its present form coincided with the re-organization of the Society as a group devoted entirely to the promotion of the Irish language.

An Gael can be read online, and is available in printed form to subscribers.
