= Séamas Ó Neachtain =

Irish-American writer

Séamas Ó Neachtain (Jim Norton) is an Irish-American writer who has published journalism, poetry and fiction in the Irish language.

Ó Neachtain is an American of Irish descent whose family have been in America for over five generations. He first learned of the existence of the Irish language in college. Over a number of years he attended classes in Long Island, New York, acquiring a mastery of the language and then teaching it himself. In 2005 he became president of the Philo-Celtic Society, one of the oldest Irish-language organisations in North America. He has appeared on Raidió na Gaeltachta and on TG4 (Irish-language television).

He helps run the Gerry Tobin Irish Language School and has been a teacher there since 2009.

He began writing a regular column in Irish for the National Hibernian Digest in 2002 and in 2004 published An File ar Buile, a book of prose and verse. In 2008 he published Cogadh Dearg, an historical novel. He also established An Gael, a quarterly Irish-language periodical which publishes prose and verse by writers from all over the world. He has published poetry, fiction and articles in Irish in such journals as Feasta and Comhar, and is also active on the Internet.

Before his involvement with the Irish language he was a composer of music.

== Published works ==
- 18 Modern Compositions & Etudes for Electric Bass (Mel Bay 1984)
- An File ar Buile (Ó Neachtain 2004)
- Cogadh Dearg (Coiscéim 2008; published in translation as Red War, 2009)
- An File agus Araile: Another Round of Poems in Irish and English (Ó Neachtain 2012)
