= Philo-Celtic Society =

Irish language promotion society in North America

The Philo-Celtic Society (Irish: Cumann Carad na Gaeilge) is a North American society founded as part of the Gaelic revival in 1873. Its aims are the promotion of the Irish language as a living tongue in America and throughout the world, and the re-establishment of Irish as the spoken language of Ireland with English as a supplement.

== History ==
The society was one of several that had their genesis in letters published in the Irish-American journal The Irish World in 1872 by Mícheál Ó Lócháin, recommending that Irish language classes and Irish language organizations be established. Ó Lócháin, a teacher by profession, started the first such class (instruction for adults) in Brooklyn in 1872. Formal societies followed: the Boston Philo-Celtic Society in 1873 and the Brooklyn Philo-Celtic Society in 1874. The New York City Philo-Celtic Society was founded in 1878, eventually giving rise to the present society. Father Dennis J. O'Donovan was an honorary member of the Boston society.

In 1881 Ó Lócháin founded An Gaodhal, the Society's bilingual monthly magazine. He died in 1899.

In the period 1878 - 1899 other Philo-Celtic Societies were founded, though their activities had little to do with the language. After 1904 most declined and vanished, a fact attributed to a general view among the Irish that the language was irrelevant to their economic and social advancement in America. The Brooklyn and Manhattan societies had merged into the New York Philo-Celtic Society by 1945.

By the 1970s promotion of the language was practically dormant. An attempt was made in 1993 to re-organize the Society so as to place more emphasis on Irish. This attempt failed, but in 2004 language activists succeeded in returning to what they regarded as the original aims of the Society.

== Activities ==
The Society's members offer support to other Irish language groups and to students throughout the world, supply CDs and books, and provide teaching materials and classes.

== An Gael ==
An Gael (presently edited by Séamas Ó Neachtain) is a quarterly literary magazine in Irish which is published on behalf of the Philo-Celtic Society. It was established in 2009. Its lineage is traced back to An Gaodhal, which was published as a bilingual journal from 1881 to 1904. An Gael is an international magazine, in keeping with the aims of the Society.
