= Docville =

Annual Belgian documentary film festival

DOCVILLE - International Documentary Film Festival
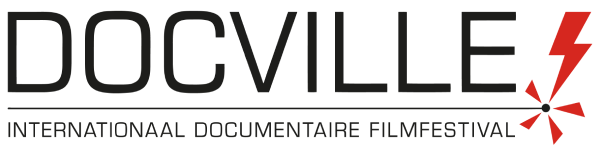
- Logo
- Location: Leuven, Belgium
- Founded: 2005
- Awards: Best Belgian Documentary; Best international documentary Best TOPICS Documentary; Best Science Documentary; Audience Award
- No. of films: 83 (2026)
- Language: Dutch, English
- Website: https://www.docville.be/

The international documentary film festival Docville is an annual documentary film festival set in Leuven, Belgium.

Docville was founded in 2005 as a thematical series within the arthouse movie theatre Cinema ZED. In the next edition the festival added competitive sections and became independent of the movie theatre. Docville takes place each year in different locations within the city of Leuven. It is the only annual, competitive documentary-only film festival in Belgium. In June 2018 the festival announced it is one of 28 film festivals in the world whose jury award-winning film will be placed on the longlist of the documentary feature category for the Academy Awards

The 16th edition was postponed due to the COVID-19 crisis (original dates: March 25 to April 2, 2020) to September 25 - October 3, 2020. The 17th edition is postponed due to the COVID-19 crisis to June 9-19th 2021. In 2023 a new section was added to the festival, dedicated to science related documentaries and activities: ScienceVille. The Nationale Loterij Prijs for best science documentary was added as a new award, therefor the old ConScience Award (which also could include science related documentaries) has been renamed to TOPICS. The 23rd edition will take place March 17th-25th 2027.

== Sections ==
=== ScienceVille ===
For the 2023 edition, a new section focused on science was added to the festival: ScienceVille. This now-permanent subsection also includes a part specifically aimed at children (ScienceVille for Kids). This subsection also introduces a new competition (the National Lottery Award for Best Science Documentary); as a result, the former Weten&Geweten Competition (which also included science documentaries) was renamed TOPICS.

Science Pitch Documentaries

A recurring element within ScienceVille is the annual creation of 2 Science Pitch documentaries. These are short auteur documentaries centered on a scientific topic and/or a scientist/researcher. Within regular documentary funding from the Flemish Audiovisual Fund, this type of topic rarely receives support in practice.

The Science Pitch is a collaboration between the 5 Flemish universities (Vrije Universiteit Brussel, KU Leuven, UAntwerpen, UHasselt, UGent), the Fonds voor Wetenschappelijk Onderzoek and VRT/Canvas. The project starts with a call via participating universities to researchers who would like a documentary made about their topics. Following an initial selection, at least 2 candidates per university are shortlisted to receive media training. The 10 remaining researchers then come to the festival to present their research to a broad audience and selected directors. Ultimately, 2 concrete film projects are selected, which must be completed in time for the festival's next edition.

Previously completed films include:

- 2023–2024 Edition: Testerep (Vincent Langouche, research by Soetkin Vervust - VUB), Coral City (Charlotte De Cort & Camille Ghekiere, research by Marc Kochzius, Kushlani Dissanayake - VUB)
- 2024–2025 Edition: Het Wonder Daaronder (Nina Landau, research by Sarah Ahannach - UAntwerpen), De dag dat het Zonlicht niet meer scheen (Frederik Stuut, Maria Stuut, research by Cem Berk Senel, Pim Kaskes - VUB)
- 2025–2026 Edition: Wie ben ik, als ik ontwaak (Lize Cuveele, research by Liselotte Gezels - UAntwerpen), (no) birdbrain (Lode Desmet, research by Frederick Verbruggen - UGent)
- 2026–2027 Edition: Tree Talk (Kristof Van Den Bergh, research by Kathy Steppe - UGent), Solar Cooker: La recette de l'écoute (Laura Vandewynckel, research by Aslihan Babayigit - UHasselt)

== Awards ==
1st edition Docville (September 28 - October 3, 2005)

No awards

2nd edition Docville (September 27 - October 3, 2006)

- Best Belgian documentary: Rwanda, Les Collines Parlent (director: Bernard Bellefroid)
- Best international documentary: Last Supper (Sweden, directors Mats Bigert & Lars Bergström)

3rd edition Docville (May 30 - June 5, 2007)

- Best Belgian documentary: Het Rijksadministratief Centrum (director: Yves Cantraine)
- Best international documentary: The Monastery: Mr. Vig and the Nun (Denemarken, regie: Pernille Rose Grønkjær)

4th edition Docville (May 10–17, 2008)

- Best Belgian documentary: Le Flic, La Juge et L'assassin (director: Yves Hinant)
- Best international documentary: Stranded (France, director: Gonzalo Arijon)

5th edition Docville (May 2–9, 2009)

- Best Belgian documentary: Zondag Gaat Het Gebeuren (director: Joeri Vlekken)
- Best international documentary: Dear Zachary (USA, director: Kurt Kuenne)

6th edition Docville (May 1–8, 2010)

- Best Belgian documentary: Vlasman (director: Jan Lapeire)
- Best international documentary: How Much Does Your Building Weigh, Mr Foster? (Spain, directors: Norberto López Amado, Carlos Carcas)

7th edition Docville (April 29 - May 7, 2011)

- Best Belgian documentary: L'Ile Déserte (director: Steve Thielemans)
- Best international documentary: Marwencol (USA, director: Jeff Malmberg)
- ConScience award: Rainmakers (The Netherlands, director: Floris-Jan Van Luyn)

8th edition Docville (April 27 - May 5, 2012)

- Best Belgian documentary: Empire of Dust (director: Bram Van Paesschen)
- Best international documentary: Il Castello (Italy, director: Massimo D'Anolfi & Martina Parenti)
- ConScience award: The Ambassador (Denmark, director: Mads Brügger)

9th edition Docville (May 3–11, 2013)

- Best Belgian documentary: Behind the Redwood Curtain (director: Liesbeth De Ceulaer)
- Best international documentary: The Expedition to the End of the World (Denmark, director: Daniel Dencik)
- ConScience award: A River Changes Course (USA, Cambodia, director: Kalyanee Mam)

10th edition Docville (May 2–10, 2014)

- Best Belgian documentary: What about Eric (director: Lennart Stuyck and Ruben Vermeersch)
- Best international documentary: Happiness (France, Finland, director: Thomas Balmès)
- ConScience award: Virunga (UK, director: Orlando von Einsiedel)

11th edition Docville (May 1–9, 2015)

- Best Belgian documentary: Twilight of a life (director: Sylvain Biegeleisen)
- Best international documentary:Garnet's Gold (UK, director: Ed Perkins)
- ConScience Award: Democrats (Denmark, director: Camilla Nielsson)
- Best Flemish TV documentary: De Werkende Mens (Director: Lode Desmet)
- Knack Audience Award:The Man Who Saved The World (Denmark, director: Peter Anthony)

12th edition Docville (April 29-May 7, 2016)

- Best Belgian documentary: Reach for the Sky (Director: Steven Dhoedt)
- Best international documentary: Life, Animated (USA, director: Roger Ross Williams)
- ConScience Award: This Changes Everything (Canada, director: Avi Lewis)
- Best Flemish TV documentary: Spul (Director: Jan Antonissen en Guillaume Graux)
- Knack Audience Award:Life, Animated (USA, director: Roger Ross Williams)

13th edition Docville (22-30 March 2017)

- Best Belgian documentary: Burning Out (director: Jérôme Le Maire)
- Best International documentary: School Life (Ireland, director: Neasa Ní Chianáin and David Rane)
- ConScience award: City of Ghosts (USA, director: Matthew Heineman)
- Best Flemish TV-documentary: Steenweg (Acht, production: Zonderlin)
- Knack Audience Award: Magnus (USA, director: Benjamin Ree)

14th edition Docville (21-29 March 2018)

- Best Belgian documentary: Zie Mij Doen (Watch Me) (director: Klara Van Es)
- Best International documentary: Piripkura (Brasil, director: Renata Terra, Bruno Jorge, Mariana Oliva)
- ConScience Award: The Deminer (Sweden, director: Matthew Hogir Hirori)
- Audience Award: Doof Kind (Deaf Child) (The Netherlands, director: Alex de Ronde)

15th edition Docville (27 March- 4 April 2019)

- Best Belgian documentary: Sakawa (director: Ben Asamoah)
- Best International documentary: Heartbound (Denmark, director: Janus Metz, Sine Plambech)
- ConScience Award: One Child Nation (USA, director: Nanfu Wang, Jialing Zhang)
- Audience Award: Free Solo (USA, director: Jimmy Chin, Elizabeth Chai Vasarhelyi)

16th edition Docville (25 September - 3 October 2020)

- Best Belgian documentary: Victoria (director: Liesbeth De Ceulaer, Sofie Benoot en Isabelle Tollenaere)
- Best International documentary: The Painter and the Thief (Norway, director: Benjamin Ree)
- ConScience Award: Collective (Romania, director: Alexander Nanau)
- Audience Award: The Cave (director: Feras Fayyad)

17th edition Docville (9 - 19 June 2021)

- Best Belgian documentary: Holgut (director: Liesbeth De Ceulaer)
- Best International documentary: Some Kind of Heaven (USA, director: Lance Oppenheim)
- ConScience Award: President (Denmark, Norway, director: Camilla Nielsson)
- Audience Award: The Jump (Lithuania, director: Giedre Zickyte)

18th edition Docville (23-31 March 2022)

- Best Belgian documentary: Juste un Mouvement (director: Vincent Meessen)
- Best International documentary: Trenches (France, director: Loup Bureau)
- ConScience Award: Jason (The Netherlands, director: Maasja Ooms)
- Audience Award: Duty of Care (Belgium, director: Nic Balthazar)

19th edition Docville (22-30 March 2023)

- Best Belgian documentary: Dag Ma (director: Marie De Hert, Ellen Pollard)
- Best International documentary: The Invention of the Other (Brasil, director: Bruno Jorge)
- TOPICS Award: Rojek (Canada, director: Zaynê Akyol)
- Nationale Loterij Award for Best Science Documentary: Make People Better (USA, director: Cody Sheehy)
- Audience Award: Wolf (The Netherlands, director: Cees van Kempen)

20th edition Docville (20-28 March 2024)

- Best Belgian documentary: Soundtrack to a Coup D'état (director: Johan Grimonprez)
- Best International documentary: The Tuba Thieves (USA, director: Alison O'Daniel)
- TOPICS Award: A Storm Foretold (Denmark, director: Christoffer Guldbrandsen)
- Award for Beste Science documentary: Eternal You (Germany, director: Hans Block & Moritz Riesewieck)
- Nationale Loterij Audience Award: Life is Beautiful (Norway, director: Mohamed Jabaly)

21st edition Docville (26 March - 3 April 2025)

- Best Belgian documentary: Slave Island (director: Jeremy Kewuan & Jimmy Hendrickx)
- Best International documentary: Songs of Slow Burning Earth (Ukraine, director: Olha Zhurba)
- TOPICS Award: Mr Nobody Against Putin (Denmark, director: David Borenstein)
- Award for Beste Science documentary: Life and Other Problems (Denmark, director: Max Kestner)
- Nationale Loterij Audience Award: My Stolen Planet (Germany, Iran, director: Farahnaz Sharifi)

22nd edition Docville (18-26 March 2026)

- Best Belgian documentary: Mariinka (director: Pieter-Jan De Pue)
- Best International documentary: A Fox Under a Pink Moon (Iran, director: Mehrdad Oskouei, Soraya Akhalaghi)
- TOPICS Award: Surviving the Death Committee (Sweden, director: Nima Sarvestani)
- Award for Beste Science documentary: A Life Illuminated (United States, director: Tasha Van Zandt)
- Nationale Loterij Audience Award: A Fox Under a Pink Moon (Iran, director: Mehrdad Oskouei, Soraya Akhalaghi)

== Special Guests/activities ==
- In 2012 British documentary film maker Louis Theroux held a masterclass at the festival
- In 2014 Canadian filmmaker Jennifer Baichwal introduced her newest documentary, Watermark. As well as Freda Kelly, former secretary of The Beatles and the subject of Good Ol' Freda. Austrian documentary film maker Erwin Wagenhofer will be presenting his newest film, Alphabet as well as giving a masterclass during the festival.
- In 2016 British documentary film maker Louis Theroux presented his first feature-length documentary My Scientology Movie in European premiere.
- In 2024 Nobel prize winner Kip Thorne was one of the guests of the festival.

== Scandals ==
In 2025, the festival organizers excluded two documentaries from the program under public pressure. One film was Russians at War, dedicated to Russia's invasion of Ukraine; it was criticized as propaganda. The second film that was cancelled was Not in My Country, Serbia’s Lithium Dilemma, that examines the controversial development of a lithium mine in Serbia’s Jadar Valley. A group of Serbian intellectuals published an open letter criticizing the film for promoting lithium mining which they described as environmentally harmful, and for portraying peaceful public protests as aggressive.
