= School Life =

School Life may refer to:

- School Life (2016 film), an Irish documentary film
- School Life (2019 film), a French teen comedy drama film
