= Cathal Ó Searcaigh =

Irish poet (born 1956)

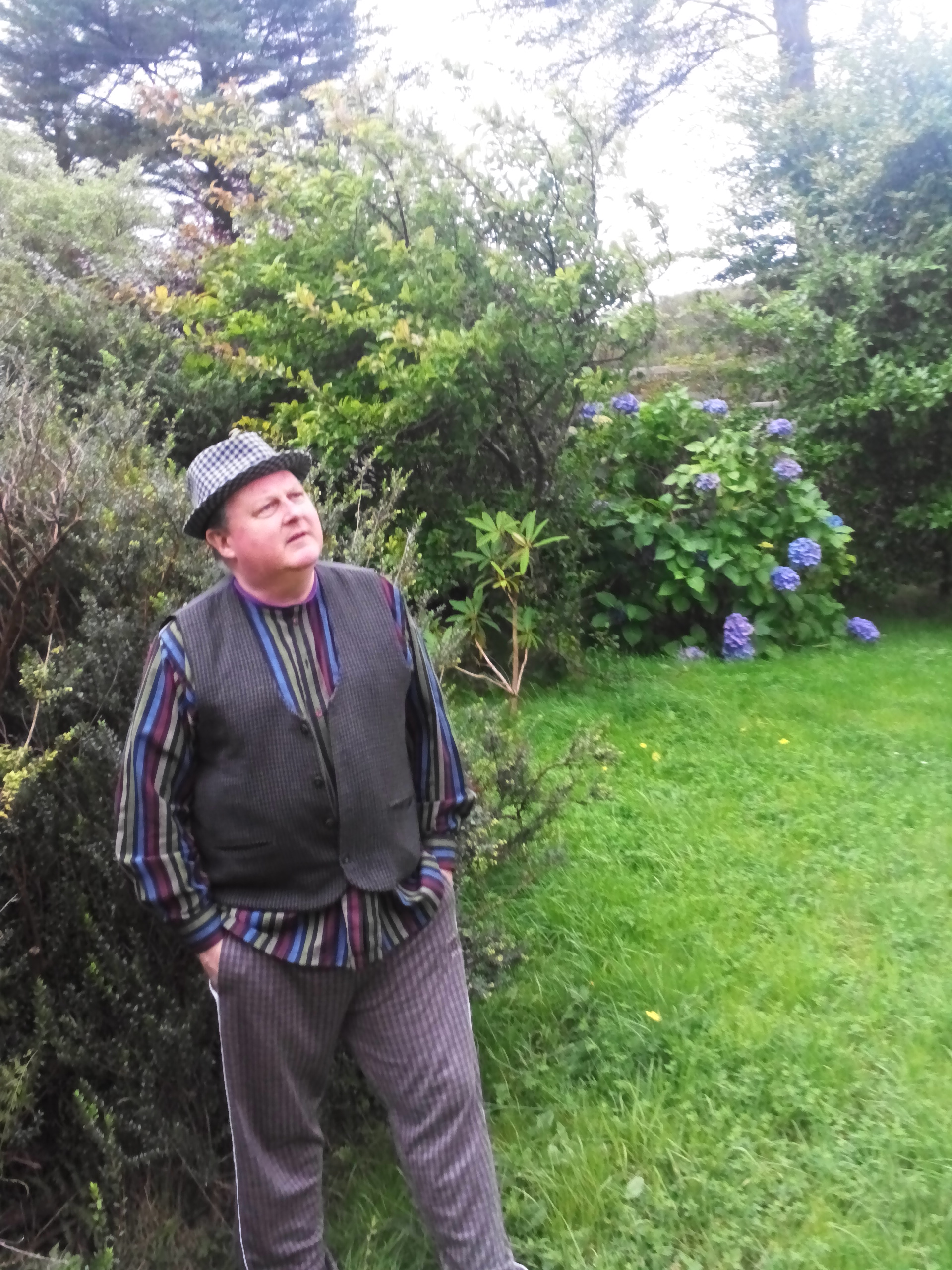
- Ó Searcaigh in 2016
- Born: 12 July 1956 (age 70); Gortahork (Gort a' Choirce), County Donegal, Ireland
- Occupation: Poet

Cathal Ó Searcaigh (Irish pronunciation: [ˈkahəlˠ ɔ ˈʃaɾˠki]; born 12 July 1956), is a modern Irish language poet. His work has been widely translated, anthologised and studied. "His confident internationalism", according to Theo Dorgan, has channelled "new modes, new possibilities, into the writing of Irish language poetry in our time".

Since 1975, he has produced poetry, plays, and travelogues. His early poetry deals with place, tongue and tradition, with his late work showing a broader scope. His work includes homoerotic love poems. Jody Allen Randolph remarks "his breaking down of stereotypes and new deployment of gendered themes opened a new space in which to consider alternate sexualities within a contemporary Irish context."

The critic John McDonagh argues that "Ó Searcaigh occupies many of the spaces that stand in opposition to the traditionally dominant markers of Irish identity". In his anthology, McDonagh goes on to say "Ó Searcaigh's homoerotic poems are explicit, relishing in a sensuality that for many years rarely found explicit expression in Irish literature."

== Early life ==
Cathal Ó Searcaigh was born and reared on a small hill-farm at the foot of Errigal (An Earagail) in the Donegal Gaeltacht. He was educated locally at Caiseal na gCorr National School and then at Gortahork Vocational College (Gairmscoil Ghort a' Choirce). He describes his childhood in a remote Irish-speaking community in his memoir Light on Distant Hills.

The first poems that engaged his attention were those of Robert Burns, read to him by his father. His English teacher at the Gairmscoil in Gortahork encouraged the young Ó Searcaigh to write; he is mentioned under the pseudonym 'Mr Lally' (in Light on Distant Hills Part 3, pp 147-164).

== Personal life ==
In the early 1970s, he worked as a barman in London. Later he attended the NIHE (National Institute for Higher Education) in Limerick where he did European Studies for two years (1973–75) and followed that with one year at Maynooth University (1977–78) where he did Celtic Studies.

From 1978 to 1981, he worked in Dublin with RTÉ television presenting Aisling Gheal, an arts and music programme directed by musician Tony MacMahon. Since the early 1980s, he has earned his living as a full-time writer and poet.

In the spring of 1995, he was elected a member of Aosdána.

His work has been translated into numerous languages – French, German, Italian, Breton, Catalan, Polish, Danish, Serbo-Croat, Romanian, Slovene, Russian, Swedish, Japanese, and Nepali. His poems have been on the Leaving Certificate Irish language curriculum and are also studied at university level.

== Controversy ==
Ó Searcaigh began to visit Nepal and sponsor the education and needs of youngsters in Nepal in 1996. The Garda Síochána (Irish police force) started to investigate Ó Searcaigh in 2006, though nothing ever came of this.

In February 2007, a film documentary (Fairytale of Kathmandu, by Neasa Ní Chianáin) queried the ethics of Ó Searcaigh's sexual relationships with some of the teens he helped, focusing on power imbalance and financial accountability, causing some controversy. In February 2009, Ó Searcaigh was interviewed in English by Dermod Moore on the controversy for Hot Press.

== Other literary activities ==
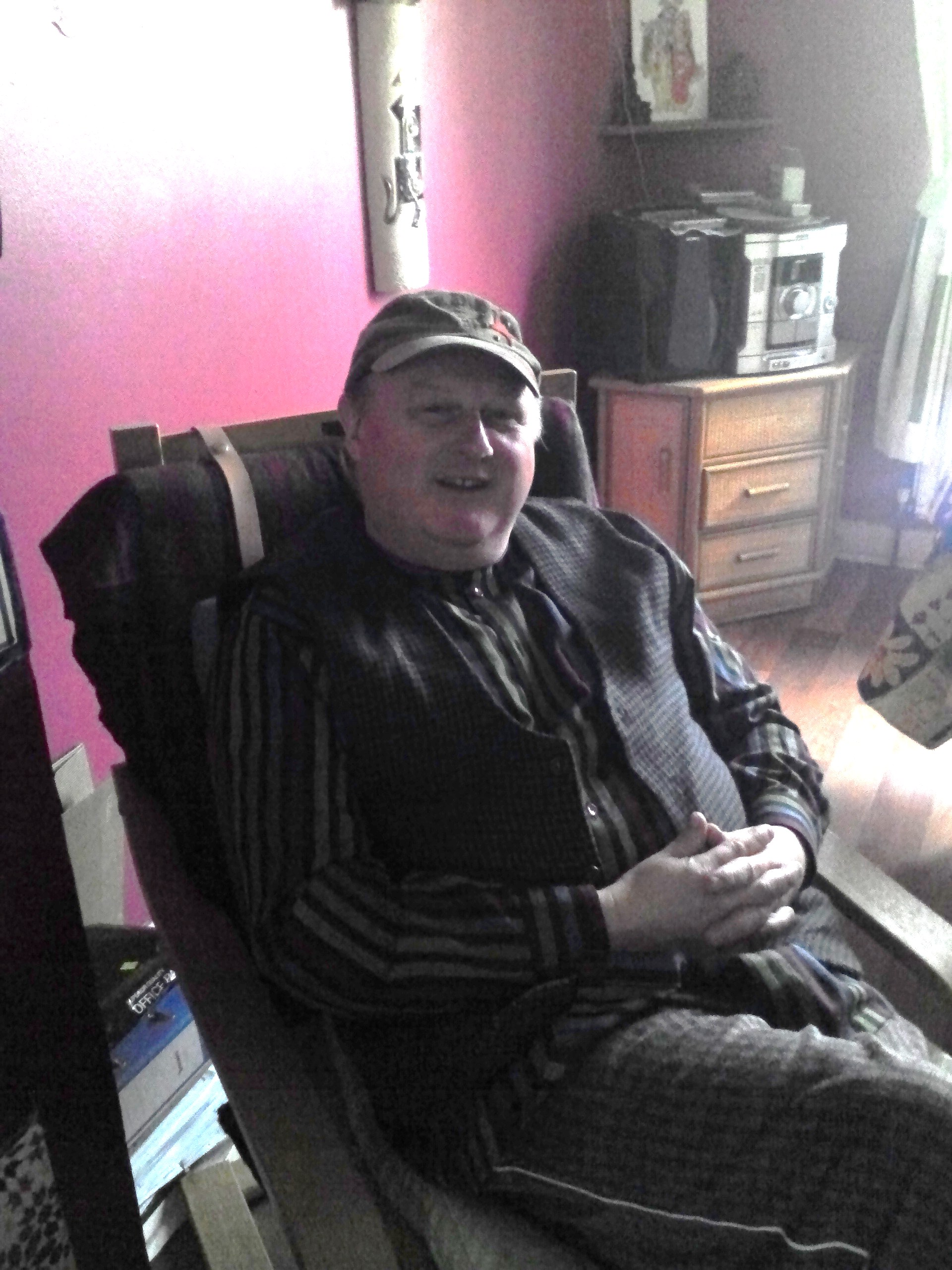
Ó Searcaigh in 2016

Ó Searcaigh has donated his archives, an extensive library of books and a valuable art collection to the Irish State. The Donegal Library Service administers this donation at present. His house in Mín a' Leá at the foot of Mount Errigal is often the venue for literary and musical evenings hosted by the poet himself.

He edits Irish Pages, a literary journal, along with poet and literary critic Chris Agee.

"Creativity for me arises out of my deep attachment to this place, out of a reverential affection for its people", he says in his memoir Light on Distant Hills. "My poems are devotional in the sense that they are prayerful celebrations of place, tongue and tradition. My work has become known because of its connectedness with this place. I have become a collector of its oral traditions, an archivist of its memories and its myths, a guardian of its Gaelic. This is, I suppose, a political act, acknowledging the local, recording and registering what is past or passing."

Colm Tóibín wrote in the Times Literary Supplement: "There is a section of landscape in Donegal in the north of Ireland near Falcarragh, overlooking Tory Island, which has been utterly transformed by the poetry of Cathal Ó Searcaigh."

== Awards and honours ==
- 1996: Elected to Aosdána
- 2000: Awarded an Honorary Doctorate in Celtic Studies from the National University of Ireland
- 2000: Awarded the Irish Times Literature Prize for Ag Tnúth Leis an tSolas, poems 1975-2000
- 2007: The Ireland Fund Literary Award for his significant contribution to Irish literature.
- 2013: He has won many Oireachtas literary awards since the beginning of his literary career, the most recent being the primary prize for a poetry collection with Aimsir Ársa in 2013 and again with An Bhé Ghlas in 2015

== Selected publications ==
=== Poetry ===
- 1975: Miontraigéide Chathrach agus Dánta Eile, Cló Uí Chuirreáin
- 1978: Tuirlingt (with Gabriel Rosenstock and photographer Bill Doyle) Carbad, Dublin
- 1983: Súile Shuibhne: with photographs by Rachael Giese, (a Poetry Ireland choice for 1983) Coiscéim, Dublin
- 1987: Suibhne, (nominated for the Irish Book Awards) Coiscéim
- 1991: An Bealach 'na Bhaile, Cló Iar-Chonnacht, Indreabhán, Co Galway
- 1996: Na Buachaillí Bána, Cló Iar-Chonnacht, Indreabhán
- 1999: Fiacha an tSolais
- 2000: Ag Tnúth leis an tSolas, 1975-2000, Cló Iar-Chonnacht, Indreabhán
- 2002: Caiseal na gCorr (with photographs by Jan Voster) Cló Iar-Chonnacht, Indreabhán
- 2004: Winter Lights, (collaborative haiku booklet with Nepalese Haiku Poet Janak Sapkota), Cló Ceardlann na gCnoc, Co Donegal
- 2005: Na hAingle ó Xanadú, Arlen House, Galway
- 2006: Gúrú i gClúidíní (artwork by Ian Joyce) Cló Iar-Chonnacht, Indreabhán
- 2011: An tAm Marfach ina Mairimid (artwork by Ian Joyce) Arlen House, Galway
- 2013: Aimsir Ársa (artwork by Ian Joyce) Arlen House, Galway
- 2014: Na Saighneáin (artwork by Ian Joyce) Arlen House, Galway
- 2015: An Bhé Ghlas, Leabhar Breac, Indreabhán
- 2018: Teanga na gCorr, Arlen House, Dublin
- 2020: Laoithe Cumainn agus Dánta Eile, Arlen House, Dublin
- 2021: Miontragóid Chathrach agus Dánta Eile (Leagan leasaithe / An improved version of the poet's first collection of poems published in 1975)
- 2022: An Tír Rúin, Arlen House, Dublin

=== Bilingual poetry and hybrid editions ===
- 1993: Homecoming / An Bealach 'na Bhaile (edited by Gabriel Fitzmaurice), Cló Iar-Chonnacht : winner of the Seán Ó Riordáin Prize for Poetry 1993, this book has been a bestseller and has gone into many editions
- 1997: Out in the Open: edited and translated by Frank Sewell, Cló Iar-Chonnacht, Indreabhán : this collection was nominated for the Aristeon European Prize for Poetry 1998
- 2006: By the Hearth in Mín a' Leá: translations by Seamus Heaney and Frank Sewell, Arc Publications : The Poetry Society (UK) Translation Choice for 2006
- 2015: An Fear Glas / The Green man, with artwork by Pauline Bewick (translations by Paddy Pushe, Gabriel Rosenstock and Frank Sewell) Arlen House, Galway
- 2016: Out of the Wilderness (translations by Gabriel Rosenstock) The Onslaught Press, Oxford
- 2018: Crann na Teanga, a large volume of poems selected from 17 previously published collections, presented in Irish with parallel English translations by Paddy Bush and by the poet himself. The Irish Pages Press, Belfast, with the support of the Arts Council of Ireland/An Chomhairle Ealaíon
- 2023: Errigal: Sacred Mountain, a variegated compendium of old and newly written poetry and prose in Irish and English, all on the common theme of the sacred mountain which has been a constant and vital presence in the poet's life and work. There is a Preface by writer Patrick Breslin and a scholarly Afterword by historian and archaeologist Brian Lacey. The Irish Pages Press, Belfast.

=== Prose works in Irish ===
- 2004: Seal i Neipeal (travel writing), Cló Iar-Chonnacht, Indreabhán : winner of the Piaras Béaslaí Prize for Prose in the Oireachtas 2004
- 2011: Pianó Mhín na bPreachán (novella) Cló Iar-Chonnacht, Indreabhán
- 2017: Lugh na Bua / The Deliverer: Cathal ó Searcaigh, Seán Ó Gaoithín, Seán Fitzgerald: The Onslaught Press, Oxford
- 2018: Teach an Gheafta (novel) Leabhar Breac, Indreabhán ISBN 978-1-909907-90-4
- 2023: Saighdiúir (novel) Leabhar Breac, Indreabhán. This is the first ever Irish language novel dealing with the involvement of an Irish person in World War I. ISBN 9781913814359

=== Plays ===
- 2005: Oíche Dhrochghealaí: a verse drama based on the story of Salome, Coiscéim, Dublin
- 2006: Mairimid Leis na Mistéirí: three short plays, Arlen House, Galway
- 2019: Rockabilly Balor: ceoldráma, Onslaught Press

=== Writing in English ===
- 2009: Light on Distant Hills, a Memoir, Simon & Schuster, London; available from AbeBooks.co.uk
- 2014: Soul Space: a book of spiritual wisdom (written under the pseudonym Charles Agnes) Evertype, Westport
- 2018: The View from the Glen: Selected Prose in English, The Onslaught Press, Oxford

=== History ===
- 1994: Tulach Beaglaoich: Inné agus Inniu / Tulach Begley: Past and Present, Glór na nGael, Fál Carragh

=== As editor ===
- 1997: An Chéad Chló: a selection of the work of new Irish language poets, Cló Iar-Chonnacht, Indreabhán
- 2013: The Other Tongues: an Introduction to Writing in Irish, Scots Gaelic and Scots in Ulster and Scotland, Irish Pages, Belfast
- 2013: Margadh na Míol i Valparaiso / The Flea Market in Valparaiso: Selected Poems of Gabriel Rosenstock (selected and introduced by Cathal Ó Searcaigh), Cló Iar-Chonnacht, Indreabhán
- 2014: An tAmharc Deireannach / The Last Look: the Selected Poems of Colette Ní Ghallchóir (selected and introduced by Cathal Ó Searcaigh), Arlen House, Galway

=== Collaborations: Music ===
- 2005: Tearmann (A sequence of Ó Searcaigh poems put to music by Neil Martin and performed by the poet himself with the West Ocean String Quartet), live performance, Cliften Arts Festival
- 2009: Oileán na Marbh (Song cycle with composer Neil Martin, sung by Maighread Ní Dhomhnaill and accompanied by the West Ocean Quartet) Ae Fond Kiss, West Ocean Records
- 2012: Síle an tSléibhe (opera monodrama with composer Derek Ball, sung by Elizabeth Hilliard with chamber group and electroacoustic sound) live performances at the Back Loft (La Catedral theatre) Dublin in Sept 2012, and the Contemporary Music Centre, Dublin in Jan 2013
- 2013: Rhapsody na gCrann (words by Cathal Ó Searcaigh, music by Ciarán and Pól Brennan, sung by Clannad) Clannad Nádúr Arc Music

Cathal has also collaborated with Altan, Brian Kennedy, Diana Cannon and many other well-known musicians.

=== Collaborations: Art ===
- 2003: Trasnú, a collaboration with artist Maria Simonds Gooding which included an exhibition, public forum and book (published by An Gailearaí, Gaoth Dobhair)
- 2004: Luxury of a Skylight, collaboration with artist Janet Mullarney: a limited boxed edition, numbered and signed, with poems and drawings. Published by Edizioni Canopo, Prato, Italy
- 2005: Dialann / Diary, a collaboration with artist Barbara Lea and book-maker Paulette Myres-Rich, a limited boxed edition, numbered and signed. Published by Traffic Street Press, St Paul, Minnesota
- 2012: The Green Man, A portfolio of 10 lithographs created and printed by Aoife McGarrigle at Cló Ceardlann na gCnoc, Co Donegal, with 10 poems by Cathal Ó Searcaigh: a limited boxed edition, numbered and signed
- 2004: The View from Bealtaine, based on Cór Úr, a much-anthologised poem by Ó Searcaigh, designed and printed by Barbara Tetenbaum at Cló Ceardlann na gCnoc, Co Donegal. Limited edition, numbered and signed

=== Books about his poetry ===
- 2000: Modern Irish Poetry: A New Alhambra, Frank Sewell, Oxford University Press
- 2002: On the side of Light: Critical essays on the poetry of Cathal Ó Searcaigh, edited by James Doan & Frank Sewell, Arlen House, Galway
- 2005: Na Buachaillí Dána: Cathal Ó Searcaigh, Gabriel Rosenstock by Pádraig de Paor, An Clóchomhar, Dublin
