= Gabriel Rosenstock =

Irish writer (1949–2026)

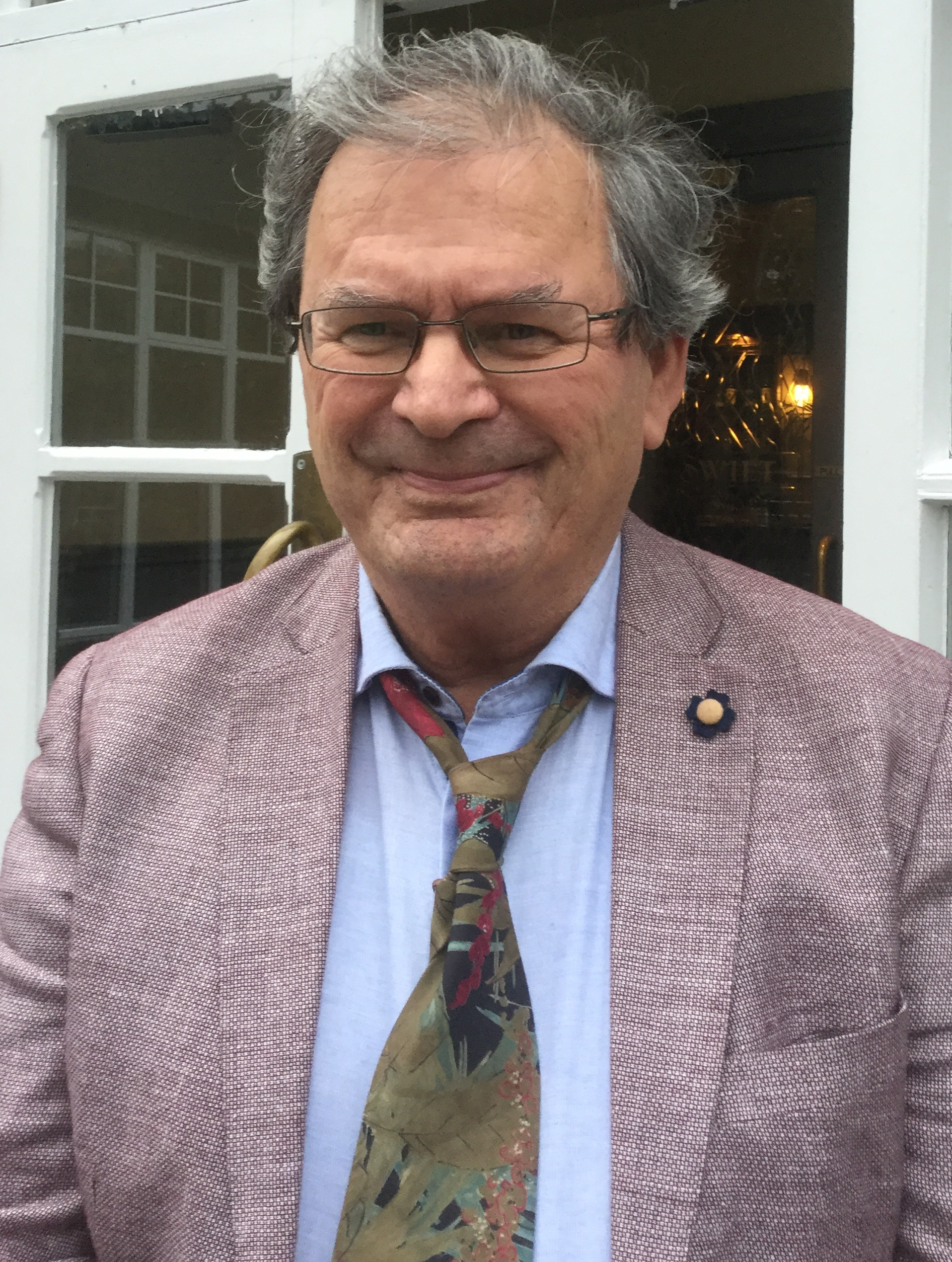
- Rosenstock in 2019

Background information
- Born: 29 September 1949; Kilfinane, County Limerick, Ireland
- Died: 6 April 2026 (aged 76) Monkstown, Dublin, Ireland
- Occupation: Writer

Gabriel Rosenstock (29 September 1949 – 6 April 2026) was an Irish writer who worked chiefly in the Irish language. A member of Aosdána, he was a poet, playwright, haikuist, tankaist, essayist, and author-translator of over 180 books, mostly in Irish.

== Background ==
Born in Kilfinane, County Limerick, he resided in Dublin. Rosenstock's father George was a doctor and writer from Schleswig-Holstein, Germany, who served as a medical officer with the Wehrmacht in World War II. His mother was a nurse from County Galway. Gabriel was the third of six children and the first born in Ireland. He was educated locally in Kilfinane, then in Mount Sackville, County Dublin. He exhibited an early interest in anarchism and was expelled from Gormanston College (County Meath) and sent to Rockwell College (County Tipperary). Later, he attended University College Cork.

He had four children, one of whom predeceased him. His son, Tristan, is a member of the Irish traditional music quintet Téada, and impressionist-actor Mario Rosenstock is his nephew. Rosenstock died from cancer on 6 April 2026, at the age of 76.

== Work ==
Rosenstock worked for some time on the television series Anois is Arís on RTÉ, then on the weekly newspaper Anois. Until his retirement he worked with An Gúm, the publications branch of Foras na Gaeilge, the North-South body which promotes the Irish language. Although he worked in prose, drama and translation, Rosenstock is primarily known as a poet. He wrote or translated over 180 books.

He edited and contributed to books of haiku in Irish, English, Scots and Japanese. He was a prolific translator into Irish of international poetry (among others Ko Un, Seamus Heaney, K. Satchidanandan, Rabindranath Tagore, Muhammad Iqbal, Hilde Domin, Peter Huchel), plays (Samuel Beckett, Max Frisch, W. B. Yeats) and songs (Bob Dylan, Kate Bush, The Pogues, Leonard Cohen, Bob Marley, Van Morrison, Joni Mitchell). He also has singable Irish translations of Lieder and other art songs.

He appears in the anthology Best European Fiction 2012, edited by Aleksandar Hemon, with a preface by Nicole Krauss (Dalkey Archive Press). He gave the keynote address to Haiku Canada in 2015.

His appointment as Lineage Holder of Celtic Buddhism led to his most recent haiku collections: Antlered Stag of Dawn (Onslaught Press, Oxford, 2015), which features haiku in Irish and English, with translations into Japanese and Scots Lallans. He also wrote for children, in prose and verse. Haiku Más É Do Thoil É! (An Gúm) won the Children's Books Judges' Special Prize in 2015.

== Awards and honours ==
- Member of Aosdána (Irish academy of arts & letters)
- Laoch Lorcáin 2024
- Lineage Holder of Celtic Buddhism
- Former Chairman Poetry Ireland/Éigse Éireann
- Corresponding Member Hellenic Authors' Society
- Member of the Board of Advisors to Poetry India
- Tamgha-I-Khidmat medal (Pakistan) for services to literature.
- Honorary Life Member Irish Translators and Interpreters Association
- He taught haiku at the Schule für Dichtung (Poetry Academy), Vienna, and at the Hyderabad Literary Festival.
- 2023 recipient of the Annual Children's Books Ireland Award for his outstanding contribution to children's books.

== List of selected works ==
Poetry in Irish and bilingual editions

- Susanne sa seomra folctha. Clódhanna 1973
- Méaram. An Clóchomhar 1981
- Om. An Clóchomhar 1983
- Nihil Obstat. Coiscéim, 1984
- Migmars. Ababúna, 1985
- Rún na gCaisleán. Taibhse, 1986
- Oráistí. Rogha dánta agus dánta nua. Cló Iar-Chonnachta, 1991
- Ní mian léi an fhilíocht níos mó. Cló Iar-Chonnachta, 1993
- Rogha Rosenstock. Cló Iar-Chonnachta, 1994
- Syójó. Cló Iar-Chonnachta, 2001
- Eachtraí Krishnamurphy. Coiscéim, 2003
- Forgotten Whispers / Cogair dhearúdta. 2003. (Haiku with photography by John Minihan)
- Krishnamurphy Ambaist Coiscéim, 2004
- Rogha Dánta/ Selected Poems, translated by Paddy Bushe: CIC, 2005
- Bliain an Bhandé/ Year of the Goddess. Dedalus Press 2007
- Margadh na Míol in Valparaíso/ The Flea Market in Valparaíso (new and selected poems) CIC 2014
- Cuach ó Aois Eile ag Glaoch. Coiscéim, 2014
- Sasquatch. Arlen House, 2014
- Chogyam Trungpa: One Hundred Haiku (Japanese Edition), with English and Japanese translations. Amazon Kindle edition, 2014
- EVERY NIGHT I SEND YOU FLOWERS, Tanka in response to the art of Odilon Redon, bilingual. Cross-Cultural Communications, New York (ebook) 2020
- The Road to Corrymore / Bóthar an Choire Mhóir, Ekphrastic tanka in Irish and English. Cross-Cultural Communications, New York (ebook) 2021
- Mo Shaol Mar Scannán / My Life As A Film, a book length poem in praise of the movies
- Drops of Water, haiku in English, Irish and Scots, free ebook 2023

Criticism and essays

- Ólann mo mhiúil as an nGainséis (My mule drinks from the Ganges). Cló Iar-Chonnachta, 2003 ISBN 1-902420-78-0, ISBN 978-1-902420-78-3
- Éist leis an gCruinne. Evertype, 2014, ISBN 978-1-78201-085-2
- A Doorstopper Anthology: Bone and Marrow. The poet's forensic examination of Bone and Marrow: An Anthology of Irish Poetry. In Academia.edu, an online repository of academic articles

Poetry in English

- Cold Moon: The Erotic Haiku of Gabriel Rosenstock, 1993
- Portrait of the Artist as an Abominable Snowman. Selected Poems, translated from the Irish by Michael Hartnett, and New Poems, translated by Jason Sommer, Forest Books, 1989
- Forgotten Whispers, 2003, with John Minihan. Haiku
- Hymn to the Earth. The Silverstrand Press, 2004. (Poems and photography by Ron Rosenstock)
- Uttering Her Name (poems to the goddess Dar Óma) 2010 Salmon Poetry ISBN 978-1907056192
- The Invisible Light 2012 (Poems and photography by Ron Rosenstock)
- Where Light Begins (haiku selection) Original Writing Ltd, Dublin, 2012
- I Met a Man from Artikelly: Verse for the young and young at heart. Evertype, 2013, ISBN 978-1-78201-032-6
- The Naked Octopus: Erotic haiku in English with Japanese translations. Evertype, 2013, ISBN 978-1-78201-048-7
- Fluttering their way into my head: An exploration of Haiku for young people. Evertype, 2013, ISBN 978-1-78201-088-3
- Duet of Waterfalls with Tatsuo Murata Japan Universal Poets Association 2015

Novel in Irish

- Lacertidae. (Novella) Coiscéim, 1994

Children's books

Rosenstock has written many books of poetry suitable for children. Here is a link to a small sample of them:

- Free Kids Books

Translations

- March hare, 1994. Short stories from the Irish language author Pádraic Breathnach
- Full Moon: Ré Lán, Cló Ceardlann na gCnoc, 2010, Limited bilingual edition, Irish language translation of English haiku from the Nepalese haiku poet Janak Sapkota
- Whisper of Pines: Cogar na nGiúiseanna, Original Writing 2012. Irish language translations of English haiku from the Nepalese haiku poet Janak Sapkota
- The Moon over Tagoto (contribution to a new multi-lingual version of that classic of world literature by haiku master Buson) Beehive Publishers, 2015
- An Thirukkural as Gaeilge, 2023, ISBN 978-1782013136 (Trans created the Thirukkural) (released 10 October 2023 at Trinity College, Dublin, and published by Evertype Publications).

Books in English

- The Wasp in the Mug: Unforgettable Irish Proverbs. Mercier Press, 1993
- Haiku Enlightenment (essay) Cambridge Scholars Publishing, 2005
- Haiku, the Gentle Art of Disappearing Cambridge Scholars Publishing, 2005
- The Pleasantries of Krishnamurphy Non-Duality Press, 2011
- My Head is Missing 2012 (Detective novel)
- The Partisan and other stories. Evertype, 2014, ISBN 978-1-78201-057-9
- CHE: Haiku Glimpse K, with Tatsuo Murata, Mariko Sumikura Japan Universal Poets Association

DVD

- The Light Within (poetry, photography and soundscape, with Ron Rosenstock and Eugene Skeef)

Recorded Media

- Video readings in the Irish Poetry Reading Archive, UCD Digital Library, University College Dublin
- Haiku as Gaeilge

Textbooks

- Beginner's Irish, Hippocrene Books, New York, 2005, ISBN 0-7818-0784-0 and ISBN 0-7818-1099-X
