= Janak Sapkota =

Nepalese haiku poet

Janak Sapkota (Nepali: जनक सापकोटा; born 1987) is a Nepalese haiku poet who works mainly in the English language. He is based in Finland.

Sapkota's books include Long Days of Rain (2016). His haiku have appeared internationally in poetry journals and magazines such as The Shop, Frogpond, Shamrock, Chrysanthemum, Ardea, Fri haiku, Notes from the Gean, and The Living Haiku Anthology. His haiku are also included in haiku anthologies such as A Vast Sky, Naad Anunaad, and Poems for the Hazara.

In 2006 he won the Smrufit Samhain International Haiku Award.

== Life and work ==
Born in Baglung, Nepal, he currently resides in Finland.

He is a member of the World Poetry Movement.

Translations of his haiku are published in Finnish, Irish/Gaelic, Swedish, German, Romanian and Hindi.

== Awards ==
- 2006: Smrufit Samhain International Haiku Award
- 2009: Ukiah Haiku Award
- 2017: Commended Haiku in Iafor Vladmir Devide Haiku Award

== Publications ==
- 2004: Winter Lights, Haiku booklet with Irish Poet Cathal Ó Searcaigh, Cló Ceardlann na gCnoc, Ireland
- 2005: Lights Along the Road, co-author with American Poet Suzy Conway, Bamboo Press, Nepal, ISBN 9789994656356
- 2010: Full Moon, Limited bilingual edition, Irish translation by Gabriel Rosenstock and illustrations by Danielle Creenaune, Cló Ceardlann na gCnoc, Ireland
- 2012: A Firefly Lights the Page / Tulikärpänen valaisee sivun, Bilingual edition, Finnish versions by Arto Lappi, SanaSato, Finland, ISBN 9789525804294
- 2013: Whisper of Pines / Cogar na nGiuiseanna, Bilingual edition, Irish translations by Gabriel Rosenstock, Original Writing, Ireland, ISBN 9781908817419
- 2016: Long Days of Rain, The Onslaught Press, United Kingdom, ISBN 9781912111718

=== Inclusion in anthologies ===
- Poems for the Hazara. 2014. ISBN 978-0983770824.
- A Vast Sky. Tancho, 2015. ISBN 9780983714125.
- Naad Anunaad. Vishwakarma, 2016. ISBN 978-9385665332.
