= Fairytale of Kathmandu =

- Directed by: Neasa Ní Chianáin
- Produced by: David Rane
- Narrated by: Neasa Ní Chianáin
- Cinematography: Tristan Monbureau
- Edited by: Úna Ní Dhongháile; Declan McGrath
- Music by: Arnaud Ruest
- Release date: 21 November 2007
- Running time: 60 minutes
- Countries: Ireland; Nepal
- Languages: English; Irish

Fairytale of Kathmandu is a 2007 documentary film by Neasa Ní Chianáin.

The documentary focused on visits by the poet Cathal Ó Searcaigh to Nepal during which he had close relationships with many young boys of 16 years old or older. The documentary questioned whether Ó Searcaigh's relationships with these youths were exploitative and whether they demonstrated a power and wealth imbalance between the 50-year-old Ó Searcaigh and the young Nepalese. Ó Searcaigh is presented in the documentary as paying for the housing, food, bicycles, and clothing of boys. He mentions on camera having sex with some of them, denying that he abused them or that he coerced them into having sex with him.

According to Ó Searcaigh, he had sexual relationships with only a "small fraction" of them, and that he has never indulged in anal intercourse in Nepal.

In March 2008, Liam Gaskin, who had been acting as his public spokesman, stood down as a result of a DVD launched to defend Cathal Ó Searcaigh by his supporters in Kathmandu. One of the people interviewed to support the poet turned out not to be one of those in the documentary, but someone with the same first name, who had also been filmed, but who failed to make the final cut. No one in Kathmandu had seen the film by then, and none of the people featured in the film had signed release forms. Vinegar Hill, the production company, claimed that as the subjects were "peripheral" to the film, release forms were not used. However all three Nepalese youths interviewed in the film gave verbal permission for the use of their interviews in the film, and a trained counsellor, Krishna Thapa, director of an EU-funded Nepalese NGO, Voice of Children, was present for interviews with two of the three youths.

Ó Searcaigh has only given two extended interviews since the film was broadcast. The first was in Irish, on Radió na Gaeltachta on 26 March 2008.

The second, "The Case for the Defence" was for Hot Press magazine, in English, in February 2009.

== Legality ==
The age of consent in Nepal is sixteen, thus no local law was violated. Nepal's Supreme Court held in November 2008 that banning same sex couples from marriage violated their equality provisions in their Constitution and directed the Nepalese Government to draft laws permitting same sex marriage. However, given that age of consent in Ireland is 17 years old, and the Irish government can prosecute for foreign acts, the film caused considerable controversy in the Republic of Ireland.

Following complaints by Fiona Neary of the Rape Crisis Network it has emerged that the Irish police force have been investigating Ó Searcaigh since 2006 following complaints from the film's director.

Interpol has also been given access to footage from the documentary.

As of August 2022 (15 years on), no criminal charges have been brought, either in Ireland or Nepal.

== Showings of the documentary ==
The documentary has now been shown at 28 international documentary film festivals, including 9 Lesbian and Gay Festivals. It screened at the International Documentary Festival in Amsterdam (its first showing) and the Jameson Dublin International Film Festival where it had its first showing in Ireland in February 2008. The documentary was shown on Irish television on the evening of 11 March 2008. According to RTÉ, the show attracted 253,000 viewers. The documentary has been screened for its North American premiere at Seattle International Film Festival and its UK premiere at Edinburgh International Festival, both in June 2008. The film was awarded second place in the International Documentary Competition at Documenta Madrid in May 2008, and it won the Best Director (Documentary) award for Ní Chianáin at the 13th Ourense International Film Festival in October 2008, and the Film Critics Jury Prize for Best Documentary at the Barcelona Gay & Lesbian Festival, also in October 2008.

== Criticism of Ó Searcaigh ==
Ó Searcaigh was criticised by many journalists and commentators. One example is Quentin Fottrell, who claimed that Ó Searcaigh's charity was "conditional" and involved a power gap between a relatively wealthy European adult and Nepalese youth living in poverty. Another is Mannix Flynn, who accused Ó Searcaigh of breaching guidelines on working with disadvantaged vulnerable youth.

It emerged in the documentary that Minister for Education and Science, Mary Hanafin, while Government Chief Whip, had assisted Ó Searcaigh obtain an Irish visa for a Nepalese youth. Hanafin, who admitted being friends with Ó Searcaigh for many years, dismissed the allegations as an "irresponsible piece of journalism".

Hanafin later admitted there were "difficulties" with the inclusion of poems by Cathal Ó Searcaigh on the Leaving Certificate curriculum." However also noting the lives of many authors of works on the curriculum were questionable.

In the light of the documentary, questions were asked about an appeal he had made in 2005 to raise money for children from poor Nepalese families. An auction with several donations from celebrities had been set up, but there was no charitable trust set up.

== Defence of Ó Searcaigh ==
He was defended on multiple occasions by Senator Eoghan Harris, who said that, although he didn't "necessarily approve of people going to Nepal for sex with young men," that the "age of consent [in Nepal] is 16. So far O Searcaigh has not been accused of any criminal offence." Harris claimed that Nepal is a homophobic society, and that many of Ó Searcaigh's Nepalese accusers may have their own agendas.

Prominent gay rights campaigner and Senator David Norris defended Ó Searcaigh in Seanad Éireann: "An attempt has been made to create such a firestorm of hostile publicity that justice may never retrospectively be done."

The poet has also been defended by Máire Mhac an tSaoi, who has accused Ní Chianáin of unethical behaviour. She questions whether the film-maker ever informed Ó Searcaigh of the fact that she was no longer filming as a friend but as an antagonist (or at least as an investigative reporter).

Defenders of Ní Chianáin, on the other hand, have noted that she brought her concerns to the attention of the Irish police and social services upon her return from Nepal in 2006, and in the two-year period before the film was released, she set up a trust fund and secured counselling and support services in Nepal for boys who had encountered Ó Searcaigh.

A year after the film was broadcast, Cathal Ó Searcaigh finally made a detailed defence of all the charges against him in an extensive interview in Hot Press.

Paddy Bushe, a poet and filmmaker who became friends with Cathal Ó Searcaigh after making a documentary about him, released that film, titled The Truth about Kathmandu, in the autumn of 2009. Bushe alleges that Fairytale of Kathmandu misrepresented the views of boys interviewed by Ní Chianáin. Narang Pant, whose testimony was central to the original documentary, states he was instructed to give rehearsed answers, and that he subsequently had asked her not to use the interview she had taken with him. Bushe also interviewed another young Nepali man who states he was offered money by Ní Chianáin to give a critical account of Ó Searcaigh, which he refused to do. The comment alleging a payment for false testimony was broadcast on RTÉ Raidió na Gaeltachta which led Neasa Ní Chianáin to take legal action; as a result, RTÉ apologised to Neasa Ní Chianáin. Ní Chianáin denied that there had been any misrepresentation of the views of those interviewed, stating that social services were happy with the account presented in the film and unedited footage and transcripts. She also argued that many of the boys were still contacted by Ó Searcaigh and were receiving money from him, including the boy who asked her not to use his interview. She said this boy was under pressure from Ó Searcaigh and that the hotel managers' decision to reveal his concerns supported her account of events.
