= Nun's Island, Galway =

Island and electoral district in Galway, Ireland

Nun's Island Oileán Ealtanach
- Island
- A view of Nun's Island

- Location in Ireland
- Coordinates: 53°16′26″N 9°03′31″W
- Country: Ireland
- Province: Connacht
- County: County Galway
- Local government area: Galway City Council
- Time zone: UTC+0 (WET)
  - Summer (DST): UTC+1 (IST (WEST))

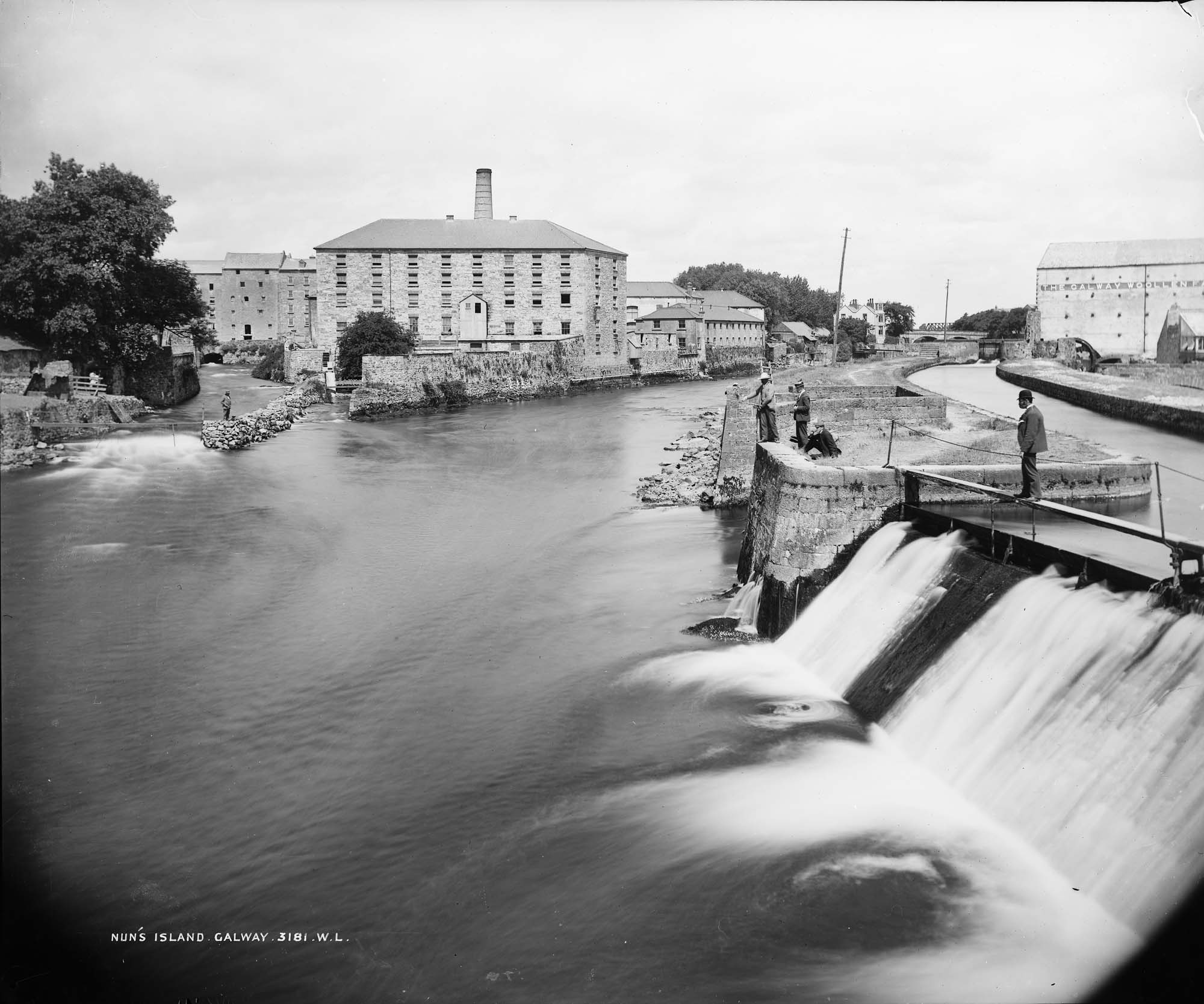
Nun's Island c. 1865 - 1914

Nun's Island (sometimes Nuns Island; Irish: Oileán Ealtanach / Altanach, meaning ' island of the flock of birds"') is an island on the River Corrib in Galway city, and an electoral division, close to Galway Cathedral. It is the location of St Joseph's Patrician College ("The Bish"), Nuns Island Theatre, some buildings operated by the University of Galway, and the site of the former Nun's Island Distillery, and Galway Crystal. Its name derives from a former Poor Clares' convent on the island, which was founded in 1649.
