= Anthony Simonds-Gooding =

Irish marketing manager and chief executive

Anthony James Joseph Simonds-Gooding CBE (10 September 1937 – 16 October 2017) was an Irish-born British business executive. He served as a chief executive officer of British Satellite Broadcasting (BSB). His sister is visual artist Maria Simonds-Gooding.

== Early life and education ==
Born in Dublin, he spent his early years in British India and later moved to County Kerry. He was educated at Ampleforth College in North Yorkshire and Britannia Royal Naval College.

== Career ==
Simonds-Gooding left the navy in 1960 and joined Unilever as a management trainee, eventually becoming marketing manager for the Birds Eye brand.

In 1973, Simonds-Gooding joined Whitbread, contributing to the branding of Stella Artois. He later worked at Saatchi & Saatchi, overseeing the company's acquisitions. In the late 1980s, he became CEO of British Satellite Broadcasting (BSB). Following BSB's collapse, he focused on charity work, particularly with Macmillan Cancer Support, motivated by his wife's cancer diagnosis. He also chaired the Rose Theatre in Kingston and D&AD, addressing financial issues in both organizations.

== Personal life ==
Simonds-Gooding married Fiona Menzies in 1961, with whom he had six children. They divorced in 1982, and he subsequently married Marjorie Pennock.
