= Nun's Island Distillery =

Irish whiskey distillery in Galway

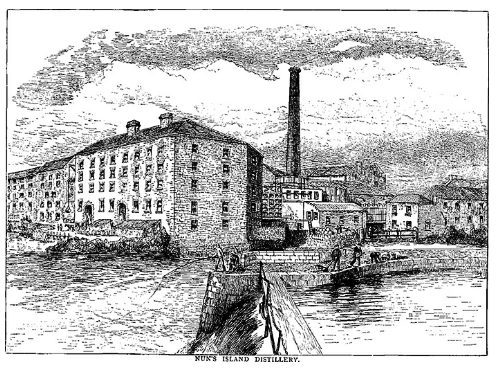
- Location: Nun's Island, Galway
- Coordinates: 53°16′22.5″N 9°3′24.1″W
- Founded: 1846 (on the site of an existing distillery)
- Status: Defunct
- No. of stills: 3 pot stills (16,000, 6,000, and 10,000 gallons)
- Capacity: 400,000 gallons per annum (1886)
- Mothballed: 1915

Nun's Island Distillery was an Irish whiskey distillery which operated on Nun's Island, Galway, Ireland, from at least 1815, and possibly as early as the late 1700s, until circa 1908.

At its peak, in the late 1800s, output at the distillery reached 400,000 gallons per annum, and with a workforce of over 100, the distillery was one of the largest local employers. Owned by the Persse family from the 1840s onwards, the distillery produced single pot still whiskey known as Persse's Galway Whiskey. The whiskey was sold locally in Connacht, where for much of the 1800s, Nun's Island was the only licensed distillery. However, it was also exported, and is said to have been a sold to the British House of Commons, a fact proudly noted on their labels.

Production at the distillery ceased circa 1908, with the remaining stocks wound down off over several few years.

A bottle of Persse's whiskey was placed for auction in 2002 with a reserve price of £100,000 - however, it failed to sell. The bottle later sold for £3,300 in 2014.

== History ==
The early history of the distillery is somewhat difficult to piece together. It is known that a distillery on Nun's Island was being operated on by a John Joyce in the late 1700s. This distillery, which was subsequently taken over by Patrick Joyce, is thought to have ceased operations in 1807.

A Patrick Joyce is recorded as running a small distillery on Nun's Island again in 1823. Therefore, it is possible that the closure was temporary. By 1828, output at the distillery had increased to 130,000 proof gallons per annum. There are claims that the distillery ceased operations again in the late 1830s. However, a newspaper advertisement from 1841 reports that a distillery "lately occupied and worked" by Messrs. James and Patrick Joyce was to be sold on 4 February 1841. The advertisement noted that the distillery was held under a 300-year lease, which had commenced in August 1815. This tallies with Alfred Barnard's 1887 report that Joyce's owned the distillery from 1815 to 1840.

In about 1840 or 1841, the distillery was purchased by the Persses, a local family who ran several other distilleries in the area. There is some conflicting information with regard to the precise and nature of the sale date. Barnard reported that the distillery was sold by the Encumbered Claims Courts in 1840. However, a newspaper article from the era reports that the distillery was to be sold by private contract in February 1841. As Barnard mentions that the Persses enlarged the original operation, the confusion may be due to piecemeal purchases of different sections of the site, or delays in finalising the sale as the distillery had been repeatedly advertised for sale beginning in at least early 1840.

Initially the Persses converted the distillery to a woollen mill, which was known for producing excellent friezes. However, when their lease on the nearby Newcastle Distillery expired in 1846, they moved their distilling operations at the Nun's Island complex, and re-established the site as a distillery.

In 1886, the distillery was visited by British historian Alfred Barnard, as recounted in his seminal publication "The Whiskey Distilleries of the United Kingdom". Barnard noted that at the time of his visit Nun's Island was the sole distillery operating in Connacht, and had an output of about 400,000 gallons per annum. In addition to offices, workshops, stables, and storehouses, the distillery buildings included two lofty Maltings and Corn stores built of stone, five storeys of which were devoted to the storing of corn, and two to malting purposes; an elegant brew house equal to any in Ireland; a back house containing thirteen washbacks, each with a capacity of about 18,000 gallons; a still house containing a 16,000 gallon wash still, a 10,000 gallon spirit still, and a 6,000 gallon low-wines still; a spirit store occupied by a 12,000 gallon vat; and five warehouses, holding a total of about 5,000 casks at the time.

Like many other Irish distilleries, Nun's Island encountered financial difficulties during the early part of the 20th Century, is thought to have closed shortly before World War I.

Since closing, some of the distillery complex has been demolished. However, several of the main distillery buildings, notably the large riverside warehouse, are still extant.

== Bibliography ==
- Barnard, Alfred (1887). The Whisky Distilleries of the United Kingdom. London: The Proprietors of "Harper's Weekly Gazette".
- Townsend, Brian (1997–1999). The Lost Distilleries of Ireland. Glasgow: Angels' Share (Neil Wilson Publishing). ISBN 1897784872.
