= Nuns Island Theatre =

Performance venue in Galway, Ireland

Nun's Island Theatre
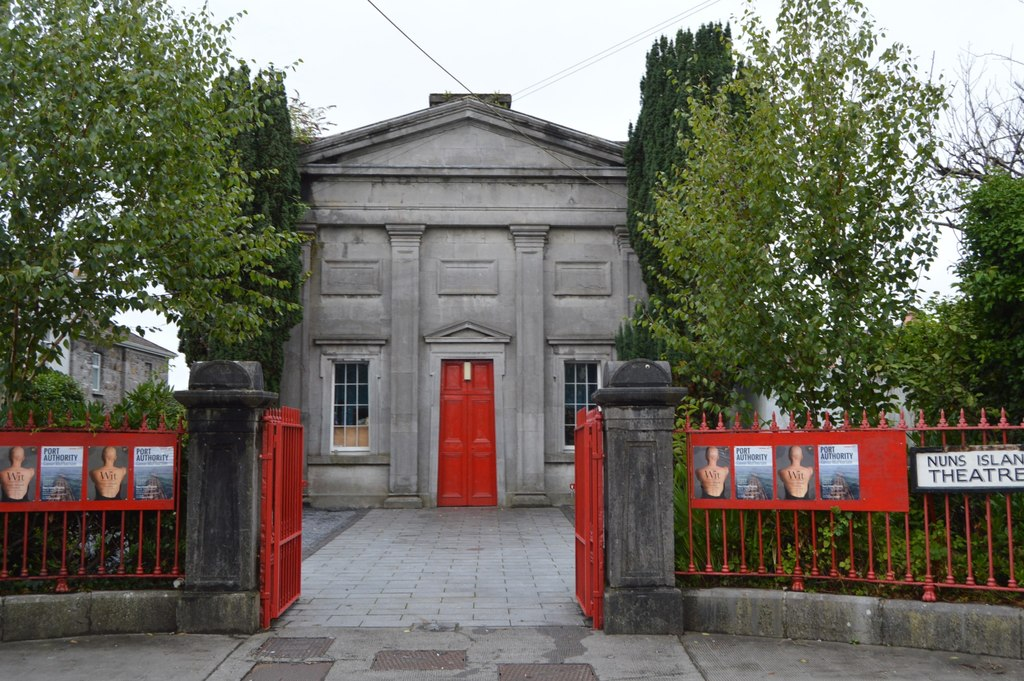
- Classical-style façade of the venue on Nun's Island Street, Galway
- Interactive map of Nun's Island Theatre
- Address: Nun's Island Street; Galway; Ireland
- Coordinates: 53.2723°N 9.0576°W
- Owner: Galway City Council
- Capacity: 82 (seats)
- Type: Theatre and arts venue
- Designation: Protected structure
- Parking: No

Construction
- Built: c. 1840
- Renovated: 2004

Tenant
- Galway Arts Centre

Nun's Island Theatre is an 82-seat performance venue, operated by the Galway Arts Centre, in the Nun's Island area of Galway city in Ireland.

== History ==
The theatre operates from a former Presbyterian meeting house, which was built c. 1840 by architect James Cusack. The building, which is a protected structure, was repurposed as a cultural venue in the early 1980s and became the home of the Galway Arts Centre. The building was purchased by Galway City Council in 1986 and renovated in 2004.

The "church house", at the rear of Nun's Island Theatre, was acquired in 2015. In 2021, €170,000 in funding was allocated to develop the church house into an additional "creative space" at the venue. In 2023 and 2024, additional funding was allocated (via the city council and European Regional Development Fund) for conservation and repairs to the theatre.

== Use ==
Nun's Island Theatre retains several of the architectural features from its time as a church, including high ceilings and large windows. The interior has been modified to suit its current use as a theatre, with seating for 82 people.

The venue is used for theatrical productions, exhibitions, private screenings, and conferences. It is also home to the Galway Youth Theatre and has been used as a venue during the Galway International Arts Festival and the Galway Theatre Festival.
