= Maria Simonds-Gooding =

Irish painter (born 1939)

Maria Simonds-Gooding RHA
- Born: 1939 (age 86–87); British India
- Education: National College of Art and Design; Bath Academy of Art
- Relatives: Anthony Simonds-Gooding (brother)
- Website: simonds-gooding.com

Maria Simonds-Gooding RHA (born 1939) is an Irish painter and printmaker based in the Dingle Peninsula.

Simonds-Gooding is a member of Aosdána.

Her brother was Dublin-based business executive Anthony Simonds-Gooding.

== Background ==
At the age of seven, Simonds-Gooding moved with her family from British India to Dooks, County Kerry, Ireland, later relocating to the Dingle Peninsula in her late twenties. She attended National College of Art and Design in Dublin (1962-63), Le Centre de Peinture in Brussels (1963-64) and Bath Academy of Art in Corsham, England (1966-68). During her final year studying in Bath, Simonds-Gooding lived in the Academy and began working with plaster, influenced by her painting tutor Adrian Heath.

== Career ==
Since the late 1960s Simonds-Gooding has worked across a wide range of mediums, including plaster, aluminium, oil on paper, drawings, prints and tapestry. In 1968 she set up a studio in a secluded village on the Dingle Peninsula, making regular trips to the Mediterranean, the Middle East and India. Her work is frequently influenced by her extensive travels to isolated communities on remote islands, mountainous regions and deserts.

In 1974 she undertook training in the Graphic Studio in Upper Mount Street Dublin, attending classes in etching. She was subsequently invited to train in the Burston Graphic Centre in Jerusalem in 1983, and spent several months in Amsterdam in the Graphic Anjeliersstraat.

In 1978 Simonds-Gooding travelled to the USA where she was introduced to the Navajo artist, Jaune Quick-to-See Smith. Quick-to-See Smith helped organise an exhibition of Simonds-Gooding's work at the Hohour Gallery in Albuquerque in New Mexico, leading to a number of successful American shows.

Simonds-Gooding was elected a member of Aosdána in 1981. Having focussed on oil painting during the 1980s Simonds-Gooding returned to plaster paintings in 1995.

In 2002 Simonds-Gooding was commissioned by the architect David Crowley, alongside 9 other artists, to each design a tapestry for the Ice Bar of the Four Seasons, Dublin.

In 2012 Simonds-Gooding was elected as a member of the Royal Hibernian Academy.

== Awards ==
- 1995: Special commendation award. Galway Arts Centre. Fifth National Print Exhibition.
- 1986: An tOireachtas Landscape Award
- 1985: Listowel Fourth International Print Biennial 1985
- 1970: Irish Exhibition of Living Art (Carroll Award for under 40's) adjudicated by Sir Roland Penrose.

== Selected solo exhibitions ==
- 2011: Ceiliúradh Mháire Mhaith / The Art of Maria Simonds-Gooding. Great Blasket Centre, Kerry.
- 2004: Fields of Vision. Taylor Galleries, Dublin.
- 2000: The Graphic Studio Gallery, Dublin.
- 1998/87/85/80 Taylor Galleries, Dublin
- 1988: Galerie Timao, The Hague
- 1986: The Solomon Gallery, London
- 1985: Crawford Municipal Gallery, Cork, Works from 1965-1985
- 1983: Hoshour Gallery, New Mexico
- 1982/78: Betty Parsons Gallery, New York

== Work in collections ==
- Crawford Art Gallery, Cork
- Albuquerque Museum, Albuquerque
- Irish Museum of Modern Art, Dublin, including: Habitation (1970, plaster, collage and oil)
- The Israel Museum, Jerusalem
- National Gallery of Modern Art, New Delhi
- Metropolitan Museum of Art, New York (Metropolitan Mus. of Art)
- Hirshhorn Museum and Sculpture Garden, Washington DC
- Philips Collection, Washington DC
