= Fiacha an tSolais =

Contemporary Irish-language poem

Fiacha an tSolais (English: The Pursuit of Light) is the title of a poem by Irish poet Cathal Ó Searcaigh (English: Charles Sharkey), first put to paper in the 1990s. It has been on the Irish exam for the Leaving Certificate in the Republic of Ireland.

The poet describes the life of an alcoholic who was found dead at the age of 29 on a cold winter day outdoors in County Donegal, Ireland.

The final stanza beings with:

Ach an té a dhéanann faillí i bhfiacha an tsolais (English: But he who neglects the pursuit of light)

and has been recorded with two different endings:

- a thiarcais, nach é féin cúis a dhorchadais (English: Sure isn't he himself the cause of his own darkness)
- nach follas go ndorchaíonn sé é féin d'aon turas (English: Isn't it obvious that he darkens himself with intent)

== Text ==
Fiacha an tSolais

I mbathlach ceannslinne a chaith sé a shaol
leath bealaigh i gcoinne Chnoc an tSéideáin;
drúncaire, a raibh a dhreach is a dheilbh maol
>agus lomchnámhach, macasamhail an screabáin
ina thimpeall, áit a bhfuarthas marbh é anuraidh
caite sa scrobarnach, lá polltach geimhridh:
a naoi mbliana fichead múchta ag ainíde dí,
is gan glór lena chaoineadh ach gocarsach cearc fraoigh.
Inniu, bhí fear an tsolais thuas ar bharr an tsimléara
ag scoitheadh sreanga leictreach.
“Tá’n bás,” ar seisean, agus é ag meabhrú ar bhás anabaí an úinéara,
“amhail gearradh cumhachta. Ainneoin ár dtola a thig sé de ghnáth."
"Ach an té a dhéanann faillí i bhfiacha an tsolais
nach follas go ndorchaíonn sé é féin d'aon turas.”

== See also ==
- Cathal Ó Searcaigh
- Irish poetry
