= School Life (2016 film) =

2016 Irish-Spanish documentary film

- Film poster
- Directed by: Neasa Ní Chianáin; David Rane
- Screenplay by: Neasa Nì Chianáin; David Rane
- Based on: school life
- Starring: Dermoit Dix; Amanda Leyden; John Leyden
- Music by: Eryck Abecassis
- Production company: Magnolia Pictures
- Release date: 19 November 2016 (IDFA)
- Running time: 99 minutes
- Countries: Ireland; Spain
- Languages: English; Spanish
- Box office: US$31, 249

School Life also known as In Loco Parentis is a 2016 Irish-Spanish documentary film about life in an Irish boarding school, written and directed by Neasa Ní Chianáin and David Rane. The film stars Amanda Leyden and John Leyden in the lead roles. The film was premiered in several international film festivals in 2016 and 2017 while had its theatrical release in the United States on 8 September 2017. The documentary film was released in Ireland and Spain with the title In Loco Parentis but the title was later changed to School Life due to its theatrical release in the US. The film was well received and opened to positive reviews from the critics. The documentary was critically acclaimed for its storyline and screenplay and was also lauded by critics as one of the finest ever documentary films. It also received several awards and nominations in several film festivals.

== Synopsis ==
The story follows a year on the lives of two motivational inspirational teachers at Headfort School which is the only primary-care boarding school in Ireland. John teaches rock music, mathematics, Latin and scripture while his wife Amanda uses her eye catching experience through books to connect with the children. Both nearly half a century have helped to shape up the futures of thousands of minds and suddenly after 46 years of dedicated teaching retirement was calling on the verge for both of them.

== Cast ==
- Dermoit Dix as himself
- Amanda Leyden as herself
- John Leyden as himself

== Critical reception ==
Joyce Slaton of Common Sense Media rated 4 out of 5 stars stating "sweet, gentle and authentic, this film chronicling a year at an Irish boarding school is the very best kind of observational documentary: one that ends with viewers feeling they've met new friends."

Michael O'Sullivan of Washington Post rated 3 out of 4 stating "The film's true subjects are the aging, loveabley, quirky Leydens: John with his unkempt cloud of long, thinning hair, Amanda with her pierced eyebrow."

Ben Kenigsberg of New York Times stated "The documentary captures the routines of an Irish boarding school and it's two of the greatest cherished teachers."

== Awards and nominations ==
Year	Award	Category	Result
2017	Irish Film and Television Awards	Best Feature Documentary Award	Nominated
2017	Sundance Film Festival	World Cinema Documentary Grand Jury Prize	Nominated
2017	San Francisco International Film Festival	Golden Gate Award Special Jury Prize	Won
2017	Visions du Réel	Prix du Public Best Film Grand Angle	Won
2017	Krakow Film Festival	Best feature-length documentary	Nominated
2017	Docville	Jury Award Best International Documentary	Won
2017	DocAviv Film Festival	Best International Film	Nominated
