= Freda Kelly =

Irish secretary

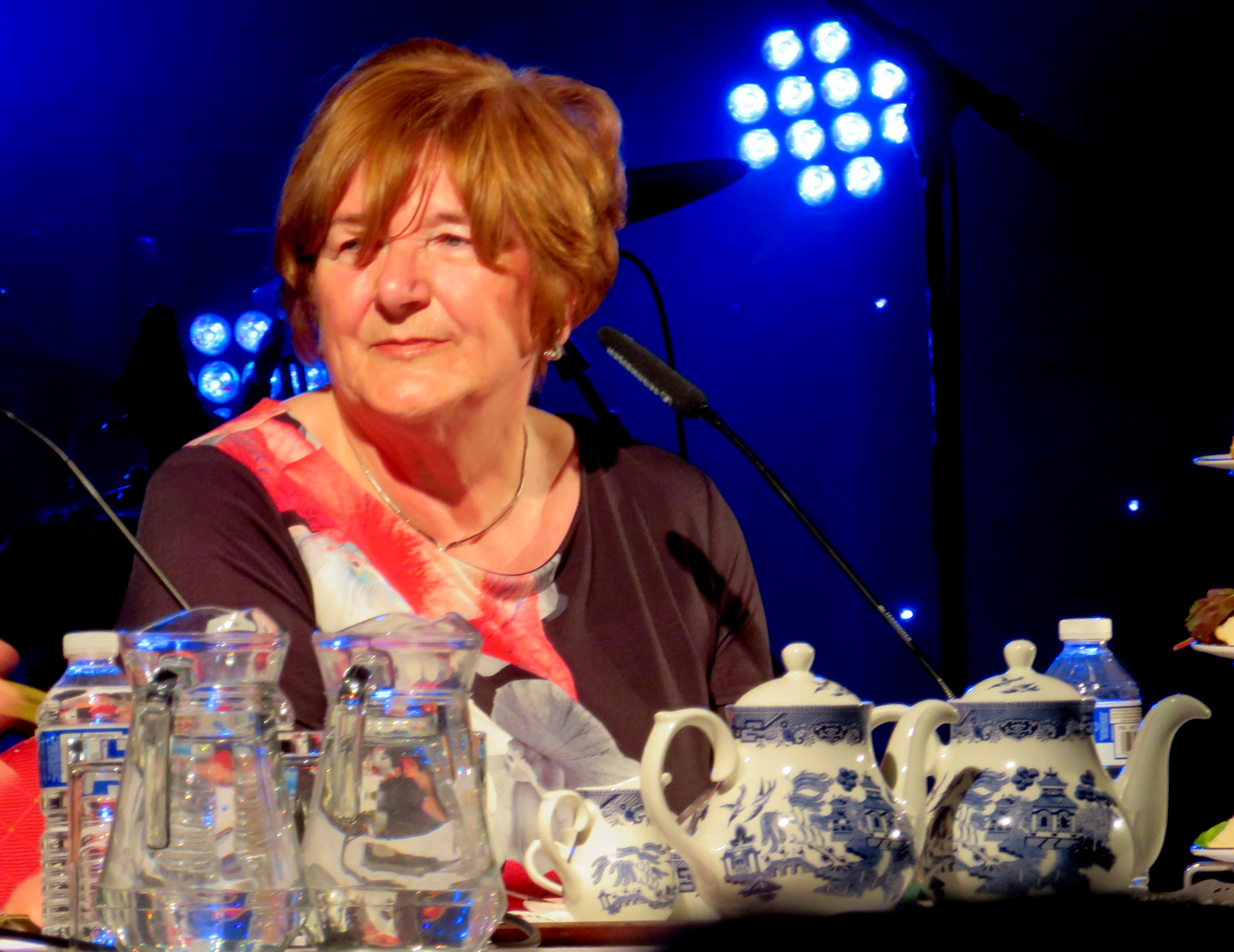
- Kelly during the International Beatleweek 2018
- Born: 14 July 1945 (age 80); Dublin, Ireland
- Occupations: Secretary to Brian Epstein; President of Beatles' Fan Club

Freda Kelly (born 14 July 1945) is an Irish secretary who was employed by the Beatles and their manager, Brian Epstein, from 1962 until 1972 and was secretary of the group's official fan club. Kelly worked with the band as they rose from local popularity to world-wide fame and through their dissolution. A 2013 documentary, Good Ol' Freda, chronicled Kelly's ten-plus year association with the group and its members.

== Background ==
Kelly was born in Dublin, Ireland, to Irish parents. When she was 13 her family moved from Sandymount in Dublin to Liverpool, where by the early 1960s she had found work as a typist. She became a fan of the Beatles after seeing them perform at the nearby Cavern Club and soon became a devoted regular – by her own estimation attending almost 200 of their shows, usually during her lunch break. The lunchtime shows were more casual than the evening performances, and in time Kelly struck up friendships with the members of the band.

== Beatles Fan Club ==
Kelly took over the role of the Beatles official fan club secretary from Roberta "Bobby" Brown.

When Brian Epstein undertook the management of the group at the beginning of 1962, he asked Kelly – already a familiar face to Epstein and the band – if she would take over the role of secretary from Bobby, who could no longer spare the time. Kelly, who was seventeen years old at the time, took the job against her father's advice.

One of her first tasks was organization of a Beatles Fan Club. Unwisely, as Bobby had previously done, she supplied her home address as the club's mailing address and her house was inundated with hundreds of letters every day. Later she changed the official address to that of Epstein's office. Kelly was responsible for responding to fans' letters, often staying up until 3 or 4 in the morning to do so. She also oversaw publication of a monthly fan club magazine.

Kelly had almost daily contact with the Beatles in the band's early days, when they would frequently visit Epstein's office. Over time Kelly became a trusted confidante to each of the Beatles, who valued her hard work and discretion.

In 1965, Epstein moved his offices from Liverpool to London. Kelly wanted to move to London as well but her father forbade it. Epstein and the Beatles, not wishing to lose her services, offered to let her continue her employment in Liverpool with visits to London a few days a month. This arrangement was acceptable to Kelly's father.

After Epstein's death in 1967, Kelly continued to work for the Beatles. She married and became a mother but officially ended her work for the group only in 1972 and even then continued to respond to fan club mail for three years.

== Later life ==
After leaving the Beatles' employ, Kelly took other secretarial jobs. She resisted repeated offers to write a book about her experiences, gave away most of her Beatles memorabilia to fans in the mid-1970s and rarely – if ever – spoke of her time with the band. Following the death of her son and the birth of her grandson, however, she agreed to allow a documentary to be filmed, and turned to filmmaker and family friend Ryan White. At the crowdfunding platform Kickstarter, they raised almost $60,000 for production costs.

Good Ol' Freda premiered at the SXSW Film Festival 2013 in Austin, Texas. The title of the film comes from the 1963 Beatles' Christmas record, the first of a series of special records created each year by the group for its fan club members. On the 1963 recording, George Harrison thanks Freda Kelly for her work, and the other three Beatles call out "Good old Freda!"

== Legacy ==
The children's animated series Beat Bugs, which takes the music of the Beatles and applies it to life lessons, features a character named Freda.
