= Galway Arts Centre =

Galway Arts Centre is a non-profit cultural organization established in 1982, dedicated to promoting the arts in Galway City, Ireland. It aims to provide "year-round access" to a number of artistic disciplines in an "inclusive, welcoming hub in the heart of Galway City".

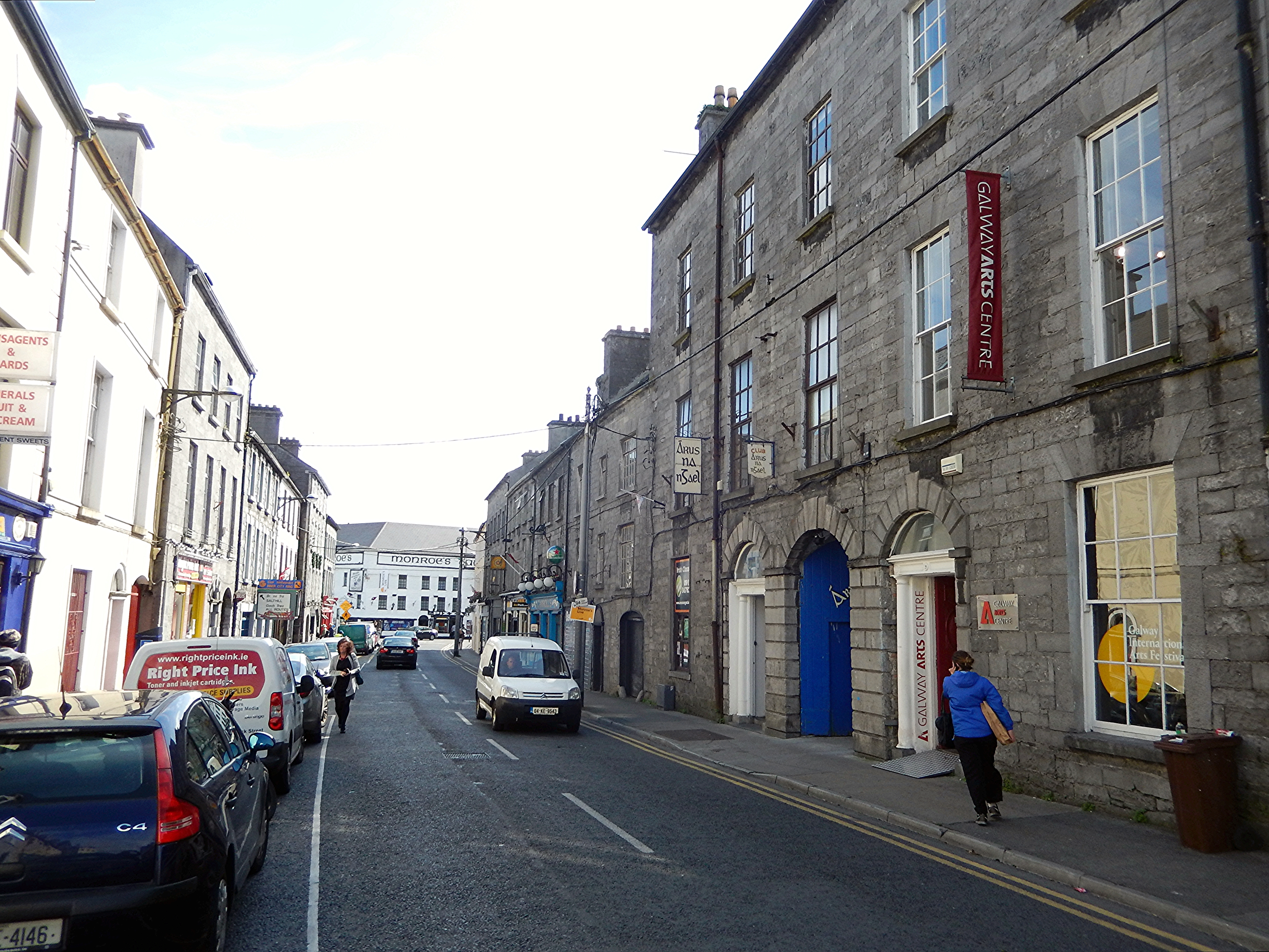
The Galway Arts Centre's main building at 47 Dominick Street

== History ==
The Galway Arts Centre's building, at 47 Dominick Street, was originally built in the 1840s as a residence for the Persse family. The centre describes itself as one of the first arts centres in Ireland outside of Dublin and emerged in 1982 from the Galway Arts Group (GAG), a collective formed to provide support and opportunities for artists. The GAG had founded the Galway Arts Festival in 1978 and opened an arts centre in the vacant former Presbyterian church in Nun's Island in 1981. The Nun's Island venue is used for visual art exhibitions, film screenings, musical performances, literary events, workshops, artist residencies, and various festivals.

As of 2024, the Galway Arts Centre operates from two main venues: the gallery at 47 Dominick Street and the Nun's Island Theatre.

== Programmes ==
The Galway Arts Centre is associated with the Cúirt International Festival of Literature, an annual literary festival which has been held since 1985. It also has initiatives, like Galway Youth Theatre and Red Bird Youth Collective, which provide young people with opportunities to engage with the arts and develop their own creative projects. The centre plays hosts several of Galway's cultural events, including the TULCA Festival of Visual Art and the Galway Theatre Festival.
