= Neasa Ní Chianáin =

Irish documentary filmmaker

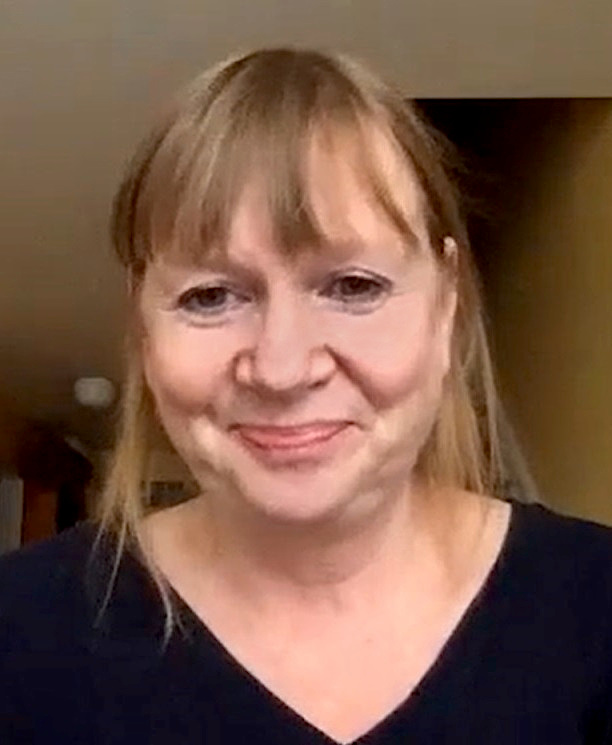
- Ní Chianáin in 2021
- Born: c. 1966
- Occupation: Documentary filmmaker
- Years active: From 2001
- Notable work: Young Plato, School Life, Fairytale of Kathmandu

Neasa Ní Chianáin is an Irish documentary filmmaker who is best known for her 2022 film Young Plato, which has been critically acclaimed and nominated for some of the most prestigious awards in the film industry, including the International Documentary Association (IDA) awards and the British Independent Film Awards.

== Biography ==
Ní Chianáin studied at the National College of Art and Design in Dublin. She worked as freelance art director on several Irish feature film and television projects, such as All Soul’s Day, Angela’s Ashes and A Love Divided, and also on the BBC TV series Rebel Heart.

Her first documentary was No Man’s Land (2001), about the asylum process in Ireland. Her more recent productions have included Frank Ned & Busy Lizzie (2004), Fairytale of Kathmandu (2007), The Stranger (2014), School Life (2016) and Young Plato (2021). In Loco Parentis/School Life premiered at IDFA 2016, and was thereafter invited to Sundance Film Festival 2017, and other international film festivals, at several of which it has won awards. Fairytale of Kathmandu also premiered at IDFA 2007, and was invited to over 30 other international film festivals. Young Plato has been Ní Chianáin's most successful film to date. It has screened at over 50 festivals worldwide and has won 11 Irish and international awards including the Irish Film and Television Academy (IFTA) award for Best Feature Documentary. Young Plato has been nominated for the prestigious IDA awards, the BIFA awards and the Satellite awards - all in 2022

Between 2006 and 2020, Neasa was co-director of the Guth Gafa International Documentary Film Festival, Gortahork, County Donegal.

She is a mother of two, and lives with her partner David Rane.

== Selected filmography ==
- No Man's Land (2001)
- Frank Ned & Busy Lizzie (2004)
- Fairytale of Kathmandu (2007)
- The Stranger (2014)
- School Life (2016)
- Young Plato (2021)

=== Fairytale of Kathmandu ===
'Fairytale of Kathmandu' has been highly acclaimed, and won several awards, including Documenta Madrid, Ourense, and the Barcelona International Gay and Lesbian Festival. Fairytale of Kathmandu questioned whether poet Cathal Ó Searcaigh's sexual relationships with young Nepalese boys in Kathmandu were proper or improper. The boys were aged between 16 and 18 at the time of filming, and Ó Searcaigh was over 50. According to Variety, the film raised questions about "power, money and what constitutes coercion". The Irish Examiner newspaper said that Ní Chianáin as a 'whistleblower' paid a high price for questioning Ó Searcaigh's behaviour in Kathamandu.

=== The Stranger ===
The Stranger explores the story of Neal MacGregor. He was an Englishman who in the 1960s had studied cabinetry, jewelry and silver design in London, and had worked for the interior designer Anthony Redmile, and had married. Then, without explanation, he relocated on his own to Inishbofin, a tiny island off the extreme north-west coast of County Donegal. (One person who knew MacGregor in the 1960s has suggested that MacGregor had had a bad acid trip during one of the Isle of Wight Festivals.) On Inishbofin, he lived in an abandoned stone hen house, too small to stand up in, without water, gas or electricity. While there, he made things with his hands: such as a grandfather clock, a windmill, and his own fishing nets and hooks. He wrote diaries. He and a local woman, Mary, formed a relationship. They grew their own vegetables, and stayed on the island during the winter, a season during which other locals returned to the mainland. There were rumours that he was a spy, or perhaps something worse. He died suddenly in 1990, from a heart attack, at the age of 43 or 44.

=== In Loco Parentis/School Life ===
In Loco Parentis (name changed to School Life for US cinema release) is a feature documentary that had its world premiere in Competition at IDFA, the largest documentary film festival in the world, and then had its North American premiere in the World Cinema Documentary competition at Sundance in January 2017. The film, shot observationally (or 'fly-on-the-wall' style) explores a year in the life of Headfort School, the last remaining boarding school for primary age (7 to 13) children in Ireland. This charming, humorous and award-winning documentary focuses on John and Amanda Leyden, who throughout their long careers at Headfort school have become legends in their own right. This warm and affectionate portrait places childhood center stage and celebrates the joy and power of teaching. The film was acquired after Sundance by Magnolia Pictures. It has screened at many international festivals and won awards at San Francisco International Film Festival (Special Jury Prize) and Visions du Réel (Prix du Public / Audience Award).

=== Young Plato ===
Young Plato is a feature documentary that had its world premiere in Competition at DocNYC in 2021, the largest documentary film festival in the USA, and then had its European premiere in the Feature Documentary competition at Thessaloniki Documentary Festival in March 2022. The film, shot observationally (or 'fly-on-the-wall' style) explores a year in the life of another school, this time a state school in the catholic enclave of Ardoyne in Belfast. Young Plato charts the dream of Elvis-loving school headmaster Kevin McArevey – a maverick who is determined to change the fortunes of an inner-city community plagued by urban decay, sectarian aggression, poverty and drugs. The all-boys primary school in post-conflict Belfast, Northern Ireland, becomes a hot house for thinking and questioning, as the headmaster encourages the children to see beyond the boundaries and limitations of their community, and sends his young wards home each day armed with the wisdom of the ancient Greek philosophers. The boys challenge their parents and neighbors to find alternatives to violence and prejudice, and to challenge the mythologies of war. Young Plato is full of Belfast humour and hums with the confidence of youth, a tribute to the power of the possible. The film has screened at over 50 international festivals and won awards at Dublin International Film Festival, Thessaloniki Doc Festival, Millenium Docs Against Gravity, Greenwich International Film Festival (Special Jury Prize), Doc Edge in New Zealand, Encounters in Cape Town and was also awarded the Japan Prize in the Best Lifelong Learning category. Young Plato has also been nominated for the prestigious IDA awards, BIFA awards and Satellite awards, all in 2022

== Awards ==
Year	Work	Event	Nomination	Result	References
2004	Frank Ned & Busy Lizzie	Celtic Film and Television Festival	Bronze Torc Award	Won	
2008	Fairytale of Kathmandu	Barcelona International Gay & Lesbian Film Festival	Jury Award	Won	
2008	Fairytale of Kathmandu	Documenta Madrid	Best Documentary	Second place	
2008	Fairytale of Kathmandu	Festival de cine internacional de Orense	Best Director (Jury Prize)	Won	
2009	Fairytale of Kathmandu	Irish Film and Television Awards	Irish Language Award	Special award	
2014	The Stranger	Locarno International Film Festival	Critics Week Award	Nominee	
2016	School Life	Irish Film and Television Awards	Best Feature Documentary Award	Nominee	
2016	School Life	Krakow International Film Festival	Golden Horn	Nominee	
2016	School Life	Sundance Film Festival	World Cinema Documentary Grand Jury Prize	Nominee	
2016	School Life	San Francisco International Film Festival	Golden Gate Award Special Jury Prize	Won	
2016	School Life	Visions du Réel	Prix du Public Best Film Grand Angle	Won	
2022	Young Plato	British Independent Film Awards	Best Feature Documentary	Nominee	
2022	Young Plato	International Documentary Association Awards	Best Feature Documentary	Nominee	
2022	Young Plato	Satellite Awards	Best Motion Picture Documentary	Nominee	
2022	Young Plato	Documentary Edge Film Festival	Best Through Generations	Won	
2022	Young Plato	Dublin International Film Festival	Best Human Rights Film	Won	
2022	Young Plato	Documentary Edge Film Festival	Best Through Generations	Won	
2022	Young Plato	Encounters SA International Documentary Festival	Programmers Choice Award	Won	
2022	Young Plato	Greenwich International Film Festival	Social Impact Award	Won	
2022	Young Plato	Irish Film and Television Awards	Best Feature Documentary	Won	
2022	Young Plato	Millennium Docs Against Gravity	Best Documentary on Psychology	Won	
2022	Young Plato	Millennium Docs Against Gravity	Best Film Lower Silesia Award	Won	
2022	Young Plato	One World International Human Rights Documentary Festival	Best Film Regional Jury Award	Won	
2022	Young Plato	Thessaloniki International Documentary Festival	Special Jury Award	Won	
