= List of women writers (A–L) =

- See also Lists of women writers by nationality.

This is a list of notable women writers.

Abbreviations: b. (born), c. (circa), ch. (children's), col. (columnist), es. (essayist), fl. (flourished), Hc. (Holocaust), mem. (memoirist), non-f. (non-fiction), nv. (novelist), pw. (playwright), wr. (writer), TV (television), YA (young adult)

== A ==
=== Aa–Ag ===
- Karen Aabye (1904–1982, Denmark), nv. & travel wr.
- Uma Aaltonen (1940–2009, Finland), YA wr.
- Jane Aamund (1936–2019, Denmark), col. & nv.
- Jane Aaron (b. 1951, Wales), wr. & scholar
- Madiha Abdalla (fl. 2010s, Sudan), newspaper editor
- Masoumeh Abad (b. 1962, Iran), mem. & academic
- Mercedes Abad (b. 1961, Spain), fiction wr.
- Ines Abassi (b. 1982, Tunisia/UAE), poet & travel wr.
- Florencia Abbate (b. 1976, Argentina), fiction wr., poet & es.
- Eleanor Hallowell Abbott (1872–1958, United States), poet & fiction wr.
- Rachel Abbott (b. 1952, England), thriller wr.
- Shaila Abdullah (b. 1971, Pakistan/United States), fiction & ch. wr.
- Yassmin Abdel-Magied (b. 1991, Sudan/Australia), wr. & media person
- Hafsat Abdulwaheed (b. 1952, Nigeria), poet & fiction & non-f. wr.
- Rreze Abdullahu (b. 1990, Kosovo), wr. & war diarist
- Louise Abeita (1926–2014, United States), wr.
- Josette Abondio (b. 1949, Ivory Coast), nv. & ch. wr.
- Sara Aboobacker (1936–2023, India), Kannada wr.
- Marguerite Abouet (b. 1971, Ivory Coast), comics wr.
- Leila Aboulela (b. 1964, Sudan), wr.
- Leila Abouzeid (b. 1950, Morocco), social wr.
- Abiola Abrams (b. 1976, United States), wr. & filmmaker
- Minnie F. Abrams (1859-1912, United States), non-f. wr.
- Liliana Abud (b. 1948, Mexico), TV screenwriter
- Umayya Abu-Hanna (b. 1961, Palestine/Finland), fiction & non-f. wr.
- Susan Abulhawa (b. 1970, Palestine/United States), nv.
- Lama Abu-Odeh (b. 1962, Palestine/United States), wr. on Islamic law
- Juliet Ace (1938–2015, Wales), pw. & scriptwriter
- Maddalena Aceiaiuoli (1557–1610, Tuscany), poet
- Nora Aceval (b. 1953, Algeria/France), story teller
- Maria Dolores Acevedo (1932–1998, Spain), nv.
- Anna Maria Achenrainer (1909–1972, Austria/Austria-Hungary), wr.
- Catherine Obianuju Acholonu (1951–2014, Nigeria), poet & social wr.
- Kathy Acker (1947–1997, United States), nv., poet & pw.
- Maximiliane Ackers (1896–1982, Germany), fiction wr.
- Bertilda Samper Acosta (1856–1910, Comoros), poet & nun
- Ofelia Uribe de Acosta (1900–1988, Comoros), suffragist
- Soledad Acosta (1833–1913, Comoros), sociologist
- Eliza Acton (1799–1859, England), cookery wr. & poet; Modern Cookery for Private Families
- Joyce Ackroyd (1918–1991, Australia), wr. & academic
- Avis Acres (1910–1994, New Zealand), ch. wr. & illustrator
- Angelina Acuña (1905–2006, Guatemala), sonneteer
- Dora Acuña (1903–1987, Paraguay), poet & col.
- Rosario de Acuña (1850–1923, Spain), poet, pw. & es.
- Alma Flor Ada (b. 1938, Cuba), ch. wr., poet & nv.
- Barbara Adair (living, South Africa), nv. in English
- Varsha Adalja (b. 1940, India), nv. & pw.
- Juliette Adam (1836–1936, France), wr. & editor
- Pip Adam (living, New Zealand), fiction wr.
- Gabriela Adameșteanu (b. 1942, Romania), fiction wr. & es.
- Draginja Adamović (1925–2000, Serbia), poet
- Abigail Adams (1744–1818, United States), First Lady of the United States, letter wr. & diarist
- Glenda Adams (1939–2007, Australia), fiction wr.
- Lois Bryan Adams (1817–1870, United States), wr., journalist & ed.
- Mary Mathews Adams (1840–1902, Ireland/United States), wr.
- Patricia J. Adams (b. 1952, Anguilla), poet, wr. & broadcaster
- Sarah Fuller Flower Adams (1805–1848, England), poet & lyricist
- Patsy Adam-Smith (1924–2001, Australia), historian
- Catherine Adamson (1868–1925, Australia/New Zealand), homemaker & diarist
- Gil Adamson (b. 1961, Canada/Newfoundland), fiction wr. & poet
- Alison Adburgham (1912–1997, England), non-f. wr. & social historian
- Fleur Adcock (1934–2024, New Zealand/England), poet & editor
- Caroline Adderson (b. 1963, Canada/Newfoundland), fiction wr.
- Yda Addis (1857–1902, United States), wr. & translator
- Lucia H. Faxon Additon (1847–1919, United States), wr.
- Kim Addonizio (b. 1954, United States), poet & nv.
- Ayọ̀bámi Adébáyọ̀ (b. 1988, Nigeria), nv.
- Bisi Adeleye-Fayemi (b. 1963, Nigeria), wr. & policy advocate
- Sade Adeniran (b. 1960s, Nigeria), nv.
- Anne-Marie Adiaffi (1951–1994, Ivory Coast), nv.
- Chimamanda Ngozi Adichie (b. 1977, Nigeria), fiction & non-f. wr.
- Akachi Adimora-Ezeigbo (living, Nigeria), wr. & educator
- Opal Palmer Adisa (b. 1954, Jamaica), poet, nv. & educator
- Halide Edib Adıvar (1884–1964, Turkey/Ottoman Empire), nv. & rights activist
- Zoe Adjonyoh (b. 1977, England), wr. & cook
- Carine Adler (b. 1948, Brazil), screenwriter
- Emma Adler (1858–1935, Austria/Austria-Hungary), nv. & non-f. wr.
- Renata Adler (b. 1937, United States), wr., col. & critic
- Sophie Adlersparre (1823–1895, Sweden), feminist editor & wr.
- Etel Adnan (1925–2021, Lebanon/United States), poet, es. & artist
- Pilar Adón (b. 1971, Spain), nv., ss. wr., poet, & translator
- Wilna Adriaanse (b. 1958, South Africa), nv. in Afrikaans
- Aesara of Lucania (4th or 3rd century BC, Ancient Greece), philosopher
- Ethel Afamado (b. 1940, Uruguay), poet & songwriter
- Gladys Afamado (1925–2024, Uruguay), poet & artist
- Anastasia Afanasieva (b. 1982, Ukraine), physician, poet, writer & translator
- Janet Afary (living, Iran/Persia/United States), historian & religious wr.
- Mahnaz Afkhami (b. 1941, Iran/Persia/United States), wr. & rights activist
- Ishrat Afreen (b. 1956, Pakistan), poet
- Vittoria Aganoor (1855–1910, Italy), poet
- Smita Agarwal (b. 1958, India), poet & academic
- Sheetal Agashe (b. 1977, India), poet
- Patience Agbabi (b. 1965, England), poet
- Berthe-Evelyne Agbo (living, Benin/France), poet
- Charlotte Agell (b. 1959, Sweden/United States), nv. & ch. wr.
- Adalet Ağaoğlu (1929–2020, Turkey/Ottoman Empire), nv., pw. & essayist
- Süreyya Ağaoğlu (1903–1989, Azerbaijan/Turkey/Ottoman Empire), legal wr.
- Pinky Agnew (b. 1955, New Zealand), pw.
- Kelli Russell Agodon (b. 1969, United States), poet, wr. & editor
- Marjorie Agosín (1955—2025, Chile), rights activist
- Gerty Agoston (living, Hu/United States), pw. & nv.
- Marie d'Agoult (1805–1876, France), fiction wr. & historian
- Agripina Samper Agudelo (1833–1892, Comoros), poet
- Brígida Agüero (1837–1866, Cuba), poet
- Silvia Agüero (b. 1985, Spain), feminist wr.
- Josefa Toledo de Aguerri (1866–1962, Nicaragua), social wr.
- Grace Aguilar (1816–1847, England), nv. & wr.
- Mila D. Aguilar (1949—2023, Philippines), poet & es.
- Anna Aguilar-Amat (b. 1962, Spain), poet & es. in Catalan
- Francisca Aguirre (1930–2019, Spain), poet
- Mirta Aguirre (1912–1980, Cuba), poet & nv.
- Milena Agus (b. 1959, Italy), nv.
- Ucu Agustin (b. 1976, Indonesia), wr. & filmmaker
- Delmira Agustini (1886–1914, Uruguay), poet

=== Ah–An ===
- Freda Ahenakew (1932–2011, Canada/Newfoundland), wr. & academic
- Cecelia Ahern (b. 1981, Ireland), nv.
- Catharina Ahlgren (1734 – c. 1800, Sweden), feminist wr., poet & editor
- Rukhsana Ahmad (b. 1948, Pakistan/England), wr. & translator
- Pegah Ahmadi (b. 1974, Iran/Persia), poet, scholar & critic
- Mimoza Ahmeti (b. 1963, Albania), poet & wr.
- Merete Ahnfeldt-Mollerup (b. 1963, Denmark), wr. & academic
- Astrid Ahnfelt (1876–1962, Sweden), fiction wr.
- Zeynep Ahunbay (b. 1946, Turkey/Ottoman Empire), conservation wr.
- Ilse Aichinger (1921–2016, Austria/Austria-Hungary), wr.
- Renate Aichinger (b. 1976, Austria/Austria-Hungary), pw. & director
- Ama Ata Aidoo (1940–2023, Ghana/Gold Coast), wr. & pw.
- Naja Marie Aidt (b. 1963, Denmark), poet & wr.cat
- Victoria Aihar (b. 1978, Uruguay), nv.
- Ginny Aiken (b. 1955, Cuba/United States), fiction wr.
- Joan Aiken (1924–2004, England), nv.
- Aganice Ainianos (1838–1892, Greece), poet
- Sarona Aiono-Iosefa (b. 1962, New Zealand), ch. wr.
- Ashia (died 1009/1010, Spain), poet in Arabic
- Amanda Aizpuriete (1956—2023, Latvia), poet & translator
- Tobiloba Ajayi (living, Nigeria), wr. & campaigner
- Iris Akahoshi (1929–1987, United States), wr. for Amnesty International
- Miriam Akavia (1927–2015, Poland/Israel), mem. & Hc. survivor
- Akiko Akazome (赤染晶子, 1974–2017, Japan), fiction wr.
- Akazome Emon (赤染衛門, late 950s/early 960s – post-1041), poet & historian
- Miriam Akavia (1927–2015, Poland/Israel), wr. & translator
- Grace Akello (b. 1950, Uganda), poet, es. & folklorist
- Anna Åkerhjelm (1647–1693, Sweden), wr. & traveler
- Rachel Akerman (1522–1544, Austria/Austria-Hungary), poet
- Sonja Åkesson (1926–1977, Sweden), poet, wr. & artist
- Bella Akhmadulina (1937–2010, Soviet Union/Russia), poet
- Anna Akhmatova (1889–1966, Russia/Soviet Union), poet; Requiem
- Shaheen Akhtar (b. 1962, Bangladesh), fiction wr.
- Sakina Akhundzadeh (1865–1927, Azerbaijan), pw. & teacher
- Gülten Akın (1933–2015, Turkey/Ottoman Empire), poet
- Risu Akizuki (秋月りす, b. 1957, Japan), manga creator
- Layla al-Akhyaliyya (7th century, Ancient Arabia), poet
- Elena Akselrod (b. 1932, Soviet Union/Israel), poet
- Seza Kutlar Aksoy (b. 1945, Turkey/Ottoman Empire), ch. wr.
- Ogdo Aksyonova (1936–1995, Soviet Union/Russia), poet in Dolgan
- Magaly Alabau (b. 1945, Cuba/United States), poet & theater director
- Susanna Alakoski (b. 1962, Finland), nv. & lecturer in Swedish
- Zuleika Alambert (1922–2012, Brazil), feminist wr.
- Mathilde Alanic (1864–1948, France), nv. & ss.
- Outi Alanne (b. 1967, Finland), autobiographer
- Abimbola Alao (living, Nigeria), poet, fiction wr. & storyteller
- Alev Alatlı (1944—2024, Turkey/Ottoman Empire), economist & nv.
- Ave Alavainu (1942–2022, Estonia), poet
- Suzanne Alaywan (b. 1974, Lebanon), poet & painter
- Caterina Albert (1869–1966, Spain), modernist wr.
- Eva Allen Alberti (1856–1938, United States), non-f. wr. & drama.
- Anne-Marie Albiach (1937–2012, France), poet
- Alice Albinia (b. 1976, England), non-f. wr.
- Jordie Albiston (1961–2022, Australia), poet & academic
- Daniela Albizu (1936–2015, Spain), academic, wr,, & councillor
- Núria Albó (b. 1930, Spain), poet & nv.
- Aurora de Albornoz (1926–1990, Spain), poet
- Martha Albrand (1914–1981, Germany/United States), nv.
- Vera Albreht (1895–1971, Austria/Austria-Hungary/Slovenia), poet & YA wr.
- Madeleine Albright (1937–2022, Czechoslovakia/Czech Republic/United States), political wr. & mem.
- Florența Albu (1934–2000, Romania), poet
- Erlinda K. Alburo (living, Philippines), Cebuano scholar
- Isabel Alçada (b. 1950, Portugal), ch. wr.
- Deborah Alcock (1835–1913, Ireland/England), nv.
- Mary Alcock (c. 1742–1798, England), poet & philanthropist
- Sinforosa Alcordo, Cebuano fiction writer.
- Louisa May Alcott (1832–1888, United States), nv.; Little Women
- Josefina Aldecoa (1926–2011, Spain), fiction wr.
- Isabella Macdonald Alden (1841–1930, United States), ch. wr.
- Julia Carter Aldrich (1834–1924, United States), wr.
- Sarah Aldridge (1911–2006, Brazil/United States), feminist wr.
- Claribel Alegría (1924–2018, Nicaragua), poet, es. & nv.
- Lidiia Alekseeva (1909–1989, Latvia), poet & wr. of short stories
- Georgia Alexander (1868–1928, United States), textbook wr. & edu.
- Grace Alexander (1872–1951, United States), wr. & journalist
- Concepción Aleixandre (1862–1952, Spain), medical wr.
- Marilar Aleixandre (b. 1947, Spain), nv. & poet in Galician
- Sibilla Aleramo (1876–1960, Italy), nv.
- Tatiana Aleshina (b. 1961, Soviet Union/Russia), poet & musician
- Brigitte Alexander (1911–1995, Germany/Mexico), pw. & screenwriter
- Elizabeth Alexander (b. 1962, United States), poet, es. & pw.
- Cecil Frances Alexander (1818–1895, Ireland/England), hymnist & poet
- Eleanor Jane Alexander (1857–1939, Ireland), poet & nv.
- Meena Alexander (1951–2018, India), poet & scholar
- Eva Alexanderson (1911–1994, Sweden), wr. & translator
- Elena Alexieva (b. 1975, Bulgaria), fiction wr. & poet
- Svetlana Alexievich (b. 1948, Ukraine/Belarus), non-f. wr. & col.; 2015 Nobel Prize in Literature
- Elli Alexiou (c. 1894–1986, Greece/Hungary), fiction wr. & educator
- Munira Al-Fadhel (b. 1958, Bahrain), wr. & academic
- Mirra Alfassa (The Mother, 1878–1973, France), mystic & wr.
- Estrella Alfon (1917–1983, Philippines), fiction wr. in English
- Edna Alford (b. 1947, Canada/Newfoundland), fiction wr. & editor
- María Luisa Algarra (1916–1957, Spain/Mexico), pw.
- Asma al-Ghul (b. 1982, Palestine), political wr.
- Mrs Meer Hassan Ali (fl.1832), British-born wr. about Muslim life in India
- Monica Ali (b. 1967, Bangladesh/England), nv. & es.
- Samina Ali (living, India/United States), nv. & activist
- Florina Alías (1921–1999, Spain), wr.
- Maria Dolors Alibés (1941–2009, Spain), ch. wr.
- Margarita Aliger (1915–1992, Soviet Union), poet & es.
- Bisera Alikadić (1939–2026, Yugoslavia/Bosnia-Herzegovina), poet, nv. & ch. wr.
- Margaret Alington (1920–2012, New Zealand), local historian
- Jane Alison (b. 1961, Australia), nv. & memoir wr.
- Dilshad Aliyarli (b. 1962, Azerbaijan), wr.
- Dilara Aliyeva (1929–1991, Azerbaijan), philologist & activist
- Ghazaleh Alizadeh (1947–1996, Iran/Persia), poet & fiction wr.
- Laila al-Juhani (b. 1969, Serbia), fiction wr.
- Zaynab Alkali (b. 1950, Nigeria), fiction wr. & poet
- Al-Khansā (7th century, Ancient Arabia), poet
- Jani Allan (1952–2023, South Africa/United States), col.
- Hortense Allart (1801–1879, Italy/France), nv. & es.
- Candace Allen (b. 1950, United States/England), nv., activist & screenwriter
- Hannah Allen (b. 1638, England), wr.
- Liz Allen (b. 1969, Ireland), wr. on crime & nv.
- Pamela Allen (b. 1934, New Zealand), ch. wr. & illustrator
- Lisa Allen-Agostini (b. 1970s, Trinidad), journalist, fiction wr. & poet
- Eliza Crosby Allen (1803–1848, United States), rel. ed.
- Isabel Allende (b. 1942, Chile/United States), nv.; Eva Luna
- Lauren K. Alleyne (b. 1979, Trinidad/United States), poet & fiction & non-f. wr.
- Phyllis Shand Allfrey (1908–1996, West Indies), wr.
- Svetlana Alliluyeva (1926–2011, Soviet Union), wr. & lecturer
- Margery Allingham (1904–1966, England), crime wr.
- Dorothy Allison (1949—2024, United States), wr. & speaker
- Eunice Eloisae Gibbs Allyn (1847–1916, United States), wr., correspondent & poet
- Júlia Lopes de Almeida (1862–1934, Brazil), nv.
- Lúcia Machado de Almeida (1910–2005, Brazil), fiction wr.
- Marcelina Almeida (ca. 1830–1880, Argentina/Uruguay), wr., nv., SS wr. & poet
- Rita Almeida (b. 1974, Portugal), economist
- Cora Almerino (living, Philippines), Cebuano poet
- Almucs de Castelnau (c. 1140 – pre-1184, France), poet
- Fatin al-Murr (b. 1969, Lebanon), fiction wr. & academic
- Wallada bint al-Mustakfi (1001–1080, Andalusia), poet in Arabic
- Dora Alonso (1910–2001, Cuba), fiction & ch. wr. & poet
- Marianne Alopaeus (1918–2014, Finland), nv. & es. in Swedish
- Concha Alós (1926–2011, Spain), nv.
- Faouzia Aloui (b. 1957, Tunisia), poet & fiction wr.
- Blanche d'Alpuget (b. 1944, Australia), biographer & nv.
- Hanan al-Shaykh (b. 1945, Lebanon/England), fiction wr.
- Fawziyya al-Sindi (b. 1957, Bahrain), poet & activist
- Tove Alsterdal (b. 1960, Sweden), journalist, pw. & crime fiction wr.
- Al Altaev (1872–1959, Russia/Soviet Union), ch. wr.
- Fatima al-Taytun (b. 1962, Bahrain), poet
- Phyllis Altman (1919–1999, South Africa), political wr. in English
- Mor Altshuler (b. 1957, Israel), scholar & wr.
- Amparo Alvajar (1916–1998, Spain), wr. & pw.
- Mia Alvar (living, Philippines/United States), fiction wr. in English
- Griselda Álvarez (1913–2009, Mexico), poet & politician
- Ivy Alvarez (living, Philippines/Australia), poet in English
- Julia Álvarez (b. 1950, Dominica/United States), poet, nv. & es.
- María Álvarez de Guillén (1889–1980, El Salvador), nv.
- Betti Alver (1906–1989, Estonia), poet
- Miriam Alves (b. 1952, Brazil), wr. & poet
- Moniza Alvi (b. 1954, Pakistan/England), poet & wr.
- Barbro Alving (1909–1987, Sweden), col. & feminist
- Fanny Alving (1874–1955, Sweden), nv.
- Karin Alvtegen (b. 1965, Sweden), nv.
- Encarnacion Alzona (1895–1901, Philippines), historian & suffragist
- Ifi Amadiume (b. 1947, Nigeria), poet, anthropologist & es.
- Narcisa Amália (1856–1925, Brazil), poet & activist
- Akira Amano (天野明, b. 1973, Japan), manga creator
- Chihiro Amano (天野千尋, b. 1982, Japan), screenwriter
- Kozue Amano (天野こずえ, b. 1974, Japan), manga creator
- Ana Luísa Amaral (1956–2022, Portugal), poet, nv. & es.
- Maria Adelaide Amaral (b. 1942, Portugal/Brazil), pw. & screenwriter
- Suzana Amaral (1932–2020, Brazil), screenwriter
- Catherine d'Amboise (1475–1550, France), wr. & poet
- Gabriella Ambrosio (b. 1954, Italy), nv. & es.
- Claudia Amengual (b. 1969, Uruguay), nv. & es.
- Begoña Ameztoy (b. 1951, Spain), screenwriter & painter
- Elizabeth Frances Amherst (c. 1716–1779, England), poet & naturalist
- Adibah Amin (b. 1936, Malaysia), fiction wr. & radio pw.
- Lady Amin (1886–1983, Iran/Persia), theologian & mystic
- Mahshid Amirshahi (b. 1937, Iran/Persia), fiction wr. & critic
- Balamani Amma (1909–2004, India), poet
- K. Saraswathi Amma (1919–1975, India), fiction wr.
- Jo van Ammers-Küller (1884–1966, Netherlands), nv.
- Regina Amollo (b. c. 1954, Uganda), nv. & non-f. wr.
- Pita Amor (1918–2000, Mexico), poet
- Elisa S. Amore (b. 1984, Italy), nv.
- Jaleh Amouzgar (b. 1939, Iran/Persia), scholar on Iran
- Taos Amrouche (1913–1976, Tunisia/Algeria), wr. & singer
- Teresa Amy (1950–2017, Uruguay), poet
- Loula Anagnostaki (1928–2017, Greece), pw.
- Tahmima Anam (b. 1975, Bangladesh/England), fiction wr.
- Valerie Anand (1937—2024, England), fiction wr.
- Virginie Ancelot (1792–1875, France), wr., pw. & painter
- Tamara De Anda (b. 1983, Mexico), social wr.
- Andaiye (1942–2019, Guyana), non-f. wr. & activist
- Annemette Kure Andersen (b. 1962, Denmark), poet & editor
- Clara Andersen (1826–1995, Denmark), pw. & fiction wr.
- Emilie Andersen (1895–1970, Denmark), historian & archivist
- Ingrid Andersen (b. 1965, South Africa), poet in English
- Marguerite Andersen (1924–2022, Germany/Canada/Newfoundland), wr., editor & academic
- Barbara Anderson (1926–2013, New Zealand), fiction wr.
- Deborah Anderson (b. 1970), wr., musician & filmmaker
- Ethel Anderson (1883–1958, Australia), poet, nv. & painter
- Jessica Anderson (1916–2010, Australia), fiction wr.
- Laurie Halse Anderson (b. 1961, United States), ch. & YA wr.
- Lena Anderson (b. 1939, Sweden), ch. wr. & illustrator
- Rachel Anderson (b. 1943, England), ch. & YA wr.
- Verily Anderson (1915–2010, England), ch. wr., biographer & screenwriter
- Gail Anderson-Dargatz (b. 1963, Canada/Newfoundland), nv.
- Pamela Andersson (b. 1965, Sweden), col.
- Emma Andijewska (b. 1931, Ukraine), poet & fiction wr.
- Agustina Andrade (1858–1891, Argentina), poet
- Alix André (1909–2000, France), nv.
- Neshani Andreas (1964–2011, Namibia), nv. & teacher
- Lou Andreas-Salomé (1861–1937, Russia/Germany), psychoanalyst & es.
- Isabella Andreini (1562–1604, Italy), pw., poet & actor
- Sophia de Mello Breyner Andresen (1919–2004, Paraguay), poet & wr.
- Blanca Andreu (b. 1959, Spain), poet
- Eliza Frances Andrews (1840–1931, United States), nv. & wr.
- Isobel Andrews (1905–1990, Scotland/New Zealand), pw., poet & nv.
- Marie Louise Andrews (1849–1891, United States), fiction wr. & col.
- Nadija Hordijenko Andrianova (1921–1998, Ukraine), Esperantist & autobiographer
- Hana Andronikova (1967–2011, Czechoslovakia/Czech Republic), nv. & pw.
- Sofia Andrukhovych (b. 1982, Ukraine), non-f. wr.
- Harriet Anena (living, Uganda), poet & col.
- Albalucía Ángel (b. 1939, Comoros), fiction wr. & es.
- Ángela María de la Concepción (1649–1690, Spain), mystical wr.
- Maya Angelou (1928–2014, United States), autobiographer & poet
- Jane Anger (late 16th century, England), wr.
- Lola Anglada (1893–1984, Spain), wr. & illustrator
- Maria Àngels Anglada (1930–1999, Spain), poet & nv.
- Christine Angot (b. 1959, France), nv. & pw.
- María Nsué Angüe (1945–2017, Equatorial Guinea), wr.
- Marion Angus (1865–1946, Scotland), poet in Braid Scots & English
- Loreta Anilionytė (living, Lithuania), philosopher & nv.
- Joan Anim-Addo (living, Grenada/England), academic, poet, pw. & publisher
- Domna Anisimova (c. 1810s – death date unknown, Russia), poet
- Yu Anjin (유안진, b. 1941, Korea), poet, es. & academic
- Nini Roll Anker (1873–1942, Norway), nv. & pw.
- Charlotte Anley (1796–1893, England), nv., wr. & musician
- Threes Anna (b. 1959, Netherlands), nv. & producer
- Varvara Annenkova (1795–1866, Russia), poet
- Nina Pávlovna Annenkova-Bernár (c. 1862–1933, Russia), pw. & actor
- Alexandra Nikitichna Annenskaya (1840–1915, Russia), YA wr.
- Moyoco Anno (安野モヨコ, b. 1971, Japan), manga creator
- Núria Añó (b. 1973, Spain), wr. & nv. in Catalan
- Noushafarin Ansari (b. 1939, India/Iran/Persia), wr. on librarianship
- Olga Anstei (1912–1985, Soviet Union/United States), poet & Hc. survivor
- Manana Antadze (b. 1945, Germany), wr. & translator
- Ikram Antaki (1948–2000, Syria/Mexico), social wr.
- Lalithambika Antharjanam (1909–1987, India), wr. & reformer
- Süreyya Aylin Antmen (b. 1981, Turkey/Ottoman Empire), poet & es.
- Enriqueta Antolín (1941–2013, Spain), nv.
- Dorila Antommarchi (1850s–1923, Comoros), poet
- Elmira Antommarchi (19th century, Comoros), poet
- Hortensia Antommarchi (1850–1915, Colombia), poet
- Gerda Antti (1929–2026, Sweden), poet, wr. & es.
- Gloria E. Anzaldúa (1942–2004, United States), wr., poet & activist

=== Ao–Az ===
- Temsüla Ao (1945–2022, India), poet, fiction wr. & ethnographer
- Colette Nic Aodha (b. 1967, Ireland), poet & wr.
- Yasuko Aoike (青池保子, b. 1948, Japan), manga creator
- Kotomi Aoki (青木琴美, b. 1980, Japan), manga creator
- Ume Aoki (蒼樹うめ, b. 1981, Japan), manga creator
- Leïla Aouchal (1936–2013, France/Algeria), autobiographer
- Nanae Aoyama (青山七恵, b. 1983, Japan), fiction wr.
- Lisa Appignanesi (b. 1946, Poland/England), nv. & activist
- Marta Aponte Alsina (b. 1945, Puerto Rico), nv. & academic
- Elena Apreleva (1846–1923, Russia/France), fiction wr.
- Iffat Ara (b. 1939, Bangladesh), fiction wr. & activist
- Kiyoko Arai (あらいきよこ, living, Japan), manga creator
- Motoko Arai (新井素子, b. 1960, Japan), science fiction & fantasy wr.
- Tullia d'Aragona (c. 1510–1556, Italy), poet, wr. & philosopher
- Diego Aramburo (b. 1971, Bolivia), pw. & director
- Hiromu Arakawa (荒川弘, b. 1973, Japan), manga creator
- Marie Arana (living, Peru/United States), col. & critic
- Consuelo Araújo (1940–2001, Comoros), wr. & politician
- Helena Araújo (1934–2015, Comoros), wr. & academic
- Reina Torres de Araúz (1932–1982, Panama), ethnographer & academic
- Nezihe Araz (1920–2009, Turkey/Ottoman Empire), stage & TV pw.
- Maria Arbatova (b. 1957, Soviet Union/Russia), nv., pw. & poet
- Azalaïs d'Arbaud (1834–1917, France), wr. in Occitan
- Sophie d'Arbouville (1810–1850, France), fiction wr. & poet
- Liwayway Arceo (1924–1999, Philippines), fiction wr. & scriptwriter
- Mastoureh Ardalan (1805–1848, Iran/Persia), poet & historian
- Elvia Ardalani (b. 1963, Mexico), wr., poet & storyteller
- Henri Ardel (1863–1938, France), nv.
- Jane Arden (1927–1982, Wales), film director, pw. & nv.
- Clementina Arderiu (1889–1976, Spain), poet in Catalan
- Karen Ardiff (living, Ireland), playwright & nv.
- Araceli Ardón (b. 1958, Mexico), cultural wr.
- Wani Ardy (b. 1984, Malaysia), poet & songwriter
- Olga Arefieva (b. 1966, Soviet Union/Russia), poet & musician
- Concepción Arenal (1820–1893, Spain), poet, pw. & feminist
- Hannah Arendt (1906–1975, Germany/England), political theorist The Human Condition
- Harriett Ellen Grannis Arey (1819–1901, United States), wr. & editor
- Héloïse d'Argenteuil (c. 1101–1164, France), scholar & abbess in Latin
- Mariana Sansón Argüello (1918–2002, Nicaragua), poet
- Pilar Benejam Arguimbau (b. 1937, Spain), geographer & educator
- Xela Arias (1962–2003, Spain), poet in Galician
- Yemisi Aribisala (b. 1973, Nigeria), es., painter & mem.
- Meltem Arıkan (b. 1968, Turkey/Ottoman Empire), nv. & pw.
- Hiro Arikawa (有川浩, b. 1972, Japan), nv.
- Sawako Ariyoshi (有吉佐和子, 1931–1984, Japan), nv.
- Lesley Nneka Arimah (b. 1983, Nigeria), fiction wr.
- Catherine Arley (1922–2016, France), nv.
- Marie Célestine Amélie d'Armaillé (1830–1918, France), wr., biographer & historian
- Ayşe Arman (b. 1969, Turkey/Ottoman Empire), social wr.
- Rae Armantrout (b. 1947, United States), wr., language poet & academic
- Concepción Cabrera de Armida (1862–1937, Mexico), wr. & mystic
- Claire Armitstead (living, England), journalist & essayist
- Rebecca Agatha Armour (1845–1891, Canada/Newfoundland), nv.
- Karen Armstrong (b. 1944, England), wr. on religion; A History of God
- Kelley Armstrong (b. 1968, Canada/Newfoundland), wr.
- Louise Armstrong (1937–2008, United States), wr. & feminist
- Millicent Armstrong (1888–1973, Australia), pw. & farmer
- Nína Björk Árnadóttir (1941–2000, Iceland), pw., poet & nv.
- Bergljót Arnalds (b. 1968, Iceland), ch. wr.
- Angélique Arnaud (1797–1884, France), nv. & feminist wr.
- Elena Arnedo (1941–2015, Spain), non-f. wr. & activist
- Bettina von Arnim (1785–1859, Germany), wr. & nv.
- Elizabeth von Arnim (1866–1941, Australia/England), nv. wr.
- Elizabeth Arnold (1958—2024, United States), poet
- Sarah Louise Arnold (1859–1943, United States), textbook wr.
- Joanne Arnott (b. 1960, Canada/Newfoundland), wr. in Métis
- Harriette Arnow (1908–1986, United States), nv.
- Franciszka Arnsztajnowa (1865–1942, Poland), poet, pw. & translator
- Tuuve Aro (b. 1973, Finland), fiction wr. & film critic
- Geraldine Aron (b. 1951, Ireland), pw.
- Stina Aronson (1892–1956, Sweden), fiction wr.
- Jyoti Arora (b. 1977, India), fiction wr.
- Rosa Maria Arquimbau (1909–1992, Spain), nv. & pw. in Catalan
- Beatriz Santos Arrascaeta (b. 1947, Uruguay), essayist
- Marina Arrate (b. 1957, Chile), poet & psychologist
- Inés Arredondo (1928–1989, Mexico), fiction & ch. wr. & es.
- Celinda Arregui (1864–1941, Chile), feminist wr.
- Renée Ferrer de Arréllaga (b. 1944, Paraguay), poet & nv.
- Mary Arrigan (b. 1943, Ireland), ch. wr. & illustrator
- Pat Arrowsmith (1930–2023, England), nv. & politician
- Suzanne Arruda (living, United States), mystery nv.
- Eustahija Arsić (1776–1843, Serbia), wr.
- Antonia Arslan (b. 1938, Italy), critic & nv.
- Tita Kovač Artemis (1930–2016, Yugoslavia/Slovenia), biographer & chemist
- Elizabeth Barr Arthur (1884–1971, United States), poet, non-f. wr., short story wr.
- Keri Arthur (b. 1967, Australia), nv.
- Portia Arthur (b. 1990, Ghana/Gold Coast), wr. & educator
- Inga Arvad (1913–1973, Denmark/United States), col.
- Ingrid Arvidsson (1919–2023, Sweden), poet & diplomat
- Akram Monfared Arya (b. 1946, Iran/Persia/Sweden), social wr.
- Mariko Asabuki (朝吹真理子, b. 1984, Japan), nv. & es.
- Yū Asagiri (朝霧夕, 1956–2018, Japan), manga creator
- Makate Asai (朝井まかて, b. 1959, Japan), nv.
- George Asakura (ジョージ朝倉, b. 1974, Japan), manga creator
- Amma Asante (b. 1969, England), filmmaker & screenwriter
- Devorà Ascarelli (fl. 16th century, Italy), poet
- Duygu Asena (1946–2006, Turkey/Ottoman Empire), non-f. wr.
- Julia de Asensi (1859–1921, Spain), fiction & ch. wr.
- Matilde Asensi (b. 1962), nv.
- Ranjana Ash (1924–2015, India/England), wr., critic & academic
- Helen Asher (1927–2001, Australia), nv.
- Daisy Ashford (1881–1972, England), child wr.; The Young Visiters
- Hinako Ashihara (芦原妃名子, b. 1974, Japan), manga creator
- Ashitha (1956–2019, India), fiction wr. & poet
- Beulah Ashley (1899–1965, United States), screenwriter, script supervisor
- Melissa Ashley (b. 1973, Australia), nv.
- Anastasia Ashman (b. 1964, United States), wr. & producer
- Francis Leslie Ashton (1904–1994, England), nv.
- Sylvia Ashton-Warner (1908–1984, New Zealand), nv., poet & educator
- Sara Ashurbeyli (1906–2001, Azerbaijan), historian & orientalist
- Anne Askew (1520/1521–1546, England), poet & martyr
- Sekar Ayu Asmara (living, Indonesia), screenwriter
- Nana Asma'u (1793–1864, Nigeria), poet & princess
- Izumi Aso (麻生いずみ, b. 1960, manga creator
- Isa Asp (1853–1872, Finland), poet
- Aspazija (1865–1943, Russia/Latvia), poet & pw.
- Asphyxia (living, Australia), ch. wr. & puppeteer
- Marie Aspioti (1909–2000, Gk), wr. & poet
- Ruth Aspöck (b. 1947, Austria/Austria-Hungary), fiction wr. & poet
- Cynthia Asquith (1887–1960, England), nv. & diarist
- Ros Asquith (living, England), cartoonist, ch. wr. & illustrator
- Margot Asquith (1864–1945, England), wr.
- Mina Assadi (b. 1943, Iran/Persia), poet, wr. & songwriter
- Ludmilla Assing (1821–1880, Germany/Italy), editor & biographer
- Leilah Assunção (b. 1943, Brazil), wr. & pw.
- Bibi Khanoom Astarabadi (1858/1859–1921, Iran/Persia), wr. & satirist
- Judith Astelarra (b. 1943, Argentina/Spain), sociologist
- Mary Astell (1666–1731, England), feminist wr. & rhetorician
- Thea Astley (1925–2004, Australia), fiction wr. & poet
- Tilly Aston (1873–1947, Australia), blind poet & prose wr.
- Elisa Hall de Asturias (1900–1982, Guatemala), nv. & biographer
- Cassandra Atherton (living, Australia), prose-poet & academic
- Gertrude Atherton (1857–1948, United States), wr.
- Mary Alderson Chandler Atherton (1849–1934, United States), non-f. wr.
- Diana Athill (1917–2019, England), editor, nv. & mem.
- Eleanor Stackhouse Atkinson (1863–1942, United States), wr., col. & teacher
- Louisa Atkinson (1834–1872, Australia), nv., botanist & illustrator
- Kate Atkinson (b. 1951, England), nv.
- M. E. Atkinson (1899–1974, Mary Evelyn Atkinson, England), ch. nv.
- Sarah Atkinson (1823–1893, Ireland), biographer & es.
- Tiffany Atkinson (b. 1972, England/Wales), poet & academic
- Sefi Atta (b. 1964, Nigeria), wr. & pw.
- Ayesha Harruna Attah (b. 1983, Ghana/Gold Coast), fiction wr.
- Karen Attard (b. 1958, Australia), fantasy & fiction wr.
- Mririda n'Ait Attik (c. 1900 – c. 1940s, Morocco), poet in Shilha
- Adaeze Atuegwu (b. 1977, Nigeria), fiction & non-f. wr.
- Amelia Atwater-Rhodes (b. 1984, United States), nv.
- Margaret Atwood (b. 1939, Canada/Newfoundland), nv., poet & critic
- Madeleine de l'Aubépine (1546–1596, France), poet
- Penelope Aubin (c. 1679 – c. 1731, England), nv. & translator
- Gwenaëlle Aubry (b. 1971, France), nv. & philosopher
- Dorothy Auchterlonie (1915–1991, England/Australia), academic, critic & poet
- Aude (1947–2012, Canada/Newfoundland), fiction wr.
- Ashley Audrain (b. 1982, Canada/Newfoundland), nv.
- Colette Audry (1906–1990, France), nv., screenwriter & critic
- Jean M. Auel (b. 1936, United States), nv.
- Anita Augspurg (1857–1943, Germany/Switzerland), wr. & activist
- Elisabeth Augustin (1903–2001, Germany/Netherlands), poet & fiction wr. in German & Dutch
- Lillian Aujo (living, Uganda), fiction wr. & poet
- Madame d'Aulnoy (c. 1650s – 1705, France), fairy-tale wr.
- Maria Aurora (1937–2010, Portugal), poet, nv. & ch. wr.
- Rose Ausländer (1901–1988, Bukovina), poet in German & English
- Jane Austen (1775–1817, England), nv.; Pride & Prejudice
- Mary Austin (1868–1934, United States), wr.
- Sarah Austin (1793–1867, England), translator
- Violeta Autumn (1930–2012, Peru/United States), architect & cookery wr.
- Frau Ava (c. 1060–1127, Germany), first female wr. in German
- Yekaterina Avdeyeva (1788–1865, Russia), domestic wr.
- Gertrudis Gomez de Avellaneda (1814–1873, Curaçao), nv., pw. & poet
- Yevprime Avedisian (1872–1950), Armenian poet, sort story writer & autobiographer
- Christine Aventin (b. 1971, Belgium), nv. & wr. in French
- Catharine Hitchcock Tilden Avery (1844–1911, United States), wr., editor & educator
- Victoria Aveyard (b. 1990, United States), YA fantasy wr.
- Tusiata Avia (b. 1966, New Zealand), poet & ch. wr.
- Boni Avibus (b. 2002, Indonesia), pw., poet & actor
- Yemima Avidar-Tchernovitz (1909–1998, Lithuania/Israel), ch. wr. & educator
- Bunty Avieson (living, Australia), col. & nv.
- Magdalena Avietėnaitė (1892–1984, Lithuania/United States), col. & diplomat
- Teresa of Ávila (1515–1582, Spain), nun & mystic
- Margaret Avison (1918–2007, Canada/Newfoundland), poet, editor & speaker
- Smilja Avramov (1918–2018, Serbia), non-f. wr.
- Avvaiyar (fl. 1st-century), Tamil poet
- Avvaiyar (fl. 8th-century), Tamil poet
- Avvaiyar (fl. 12th-century), Tamil poet
- Mona Awad (b. 1978, Canada/Newfoundland), fiction wr.
- Ngahuia Te Awekotuku (b. 1949, New Zealand), academic
- Diane Awerbuck (b. 1974, South Africa), fiction wr. in English
- Marilou Awiakta (b. 1936, United States), Appalachian writer
- Suzanne Axell (b. 1955, Sweden), medical wr. & TV presenter
- Celine Axelos (1902–1992, Egypt), poet & speaker
- Majgull Axelsson (b. 1947, Sweden), col. & nv.
- Ángeles López de Ayala (1858–1926, Spain), pw & activist
- Cristina Ayala (1856–1936, Cuba), poet & col.
- Elysa Ayala (1879–1956, Ecuador), wr. & painter
- Aydilge (b. 1979, Turkey/Ottoman Empire), fiction wr., poet & songwriter
- Margaret Ayer (died 1981, United States), wr. & illustrator
- Güzide Sabri Aygün (1886–1946, Turkey/Ottoman Empire), nv.
- May Ayim (1960–1996, Germany), poet
- Ángela Figuera Aymerich (1902–1984, Spain), poet
- Ayo Ayoola-Amale (living, Nigeria), poet & pw.
- Susanne Ayoub (b. 1956, Iran/Persia/Austria/Austria-Hungary), nv. & filmmaker
- Pam Ayres (b. 1947, England), poet, songwriter & presenter
- Djenar Maesa Ayu (b. 1973, Indonesia), fiction wr. & screenwriter
- Samiha Ayverdi (1905–1993, Turkey/Ottoman Empire), fiction wr. & mystic
- Félicie d'Ayzac (1801–1881, France), poet & art historian
- Shamim Azad (b. 1952, Bangladesh/England), poet & fiction wr.
- Azalais de Porcairagues (fl. late 12th century), poet in Occitan
- Shokoofeh Azar (b. 1972, Iran/Persia), nv. & journalist
- Che Husna Azhari (b. 1955, Malaysia), fiction wr.
- Hind Azouz (1926–2015, Tunisia), fiction wr. & es.
- Margarita Azurdia (1931–1998, Guatemala), poet & painter
- Samira Azzam (1927–1967, Palestine/Lebanon), fiction wr.
- Trezza Azzopardi (b. 1961, Wales), fiction wr. & broadcaster

== B ==
=== Ba–Bei ===
- Mariama Bâ (1929–1981, Senegal), nv.
- Sahar Baassiri (b. 1960s, Lebanon), political wr. & col.
- Mozhgan Babamarandi (living, Iran/Persia), ch. & YA wr.
- Alaviyya Babayeva (1921–2014, Soviet Union/Azerbaijan), prose wr. & publicist
- Natalie Babbitt (1932–2016, United States), ch. wr. & illustrator
- Gabriela Babnik (b. 1979, Yugoslavia/Slovenia), nv. & critic
- Yvonne Baby (1931–2022, France), journalist, nv. & critic
- Elena Bacaloglu (1878–1947/1949, Romania/Italy), novelist & politician
- Ottilie Bach (1836–1905, Prussia), nv.
- Ida Baccini (1850–1911, Italy), ch. wr.
- Ingrid Bachér (b. 1930, Germany), pw. & screenwriter
- Yamina Bachir (1954–2022, Algeria), screenwriter & film director
- Maria Baciu (b. 1942, Romania), poet, novelist & ch. wr.
- Ingeborg Bachmann (1926–1973, Austria/Austria-Hungary), poet, pw. & nv.
- Elizabeth Backhouse (1917–2013, Australia), nv., scriptwriter & pw.
- Delia Bacon (1811–1859, United States), pw. & fiction wr.
- Anita Rau Badami (b. 1961, India/Canada/Newfoundland), nv.
- Charlotte Baden (1740–1824, Denmark), wr. & correspondent
- Gabeba Baderoon (b. 1969, South Africa), poet in English
- Van Badham (b. 1974, Australia), pw. & nv.
- Yaba Badoe (b. 1954, Ghana/Gold Coast/England), nv. & filmmaker
- Liana Badr (b. 1950, Palestine), fiction wr.
- Bertha Badt-Strauss (1885–1970, Germany/United States), Zionist & biographer
- Bae Suah (배수아, b. 1965, Korea), fiction wr. & poet
- Emma Baeri (b. 1942, Italy), historian & es.
- Jasodhara Bagchi (1937–2015, India), critic & activist
- Enid Bagnold (1889–1981, England), wr. & pw.
- Elisaveta Bagryana (1893–1991, Bulgaria), poet
- Anna Bahriana (b. 1981, Ukraine), nv., poet & pw.
- Annette Baier (1929–2012, New Zealand), philosopher
- Maria Baiulescu (1860–1941, Romania), encyclopedist & pw.
- Joanna Baillie (1762–1851, Scotland), poet & pw.
- Alice Bailey (1880–1949, England), mystic
- Amy Bailey (1895–1990, Jamaica), social col.
- Florence Augusta Merriam Bailey (1863–1948, United States), ornithologist
- Margaret Lucy Shands Bailey (1812–1888, United States), wr., editor, publisher, poet, lyricist
- Sarah Lord Bailey (1856–1922, England/United States), non-f. wr., elocutionist, teacher
- Rosa Bailly (1890–1976, France), academic & activist
- Beryl Bainbridge (1932–2010, England), nv.
- Doreen Baingana (b. 1966, Uganda), fiction wr.
- Elizabeth-Irene Baitie (b. 1970, Ghana/Gold Coast), YA wr.
- Fatima Surayya Bajia (1930–2016, India/Pakistan), pw. & nv.
- Lidia Bajkowska (b. 1966, Poland), educator & nv.
- Latifa Baka (b. 1964, Morocco), fiction wr.
- Deb Baker (b. 1953, United States), mystery wr.
- Dorothy Baker (1907–1968, United States), nv.
- Hinemoana Baker (b. 1968, New Zealand), poet & educator
- Louisa Alice Baker (1856–1926, England/New Zealand), nv. & ch. wr.
- Khnata bent Bakkar (1668–1754, Morocco), ruler & social analyst
- Margaret Bakkes (1931–2016, South Africa), fiction wr. in Afrikaans
- Albena Bakratcheva (b. 1961, Bulgaria), transcendentalist
- Asma El Bakry (1947–2015, Egypt), wr. & film director
- Layla Balabakki (1936–2023, Lebanon), nv. & activist
- Bettina Balàka (b. 1966, Austria/Austria-Hungary), fiction wr., poet & pw.
- Margaret Balderson (b. 1935, Australia), ch. wr.
- Maria Baldó i Massanet (1884–1964, Spain), pedagogue, ethnologist, folklorist, non-f. wr.
- Kristín Marja Baldursdóttir (b. 1949, Iceland), nv.
- Faith Baldwin (1893–1978, United States), fiction wr.
- Rowena Bali (b. 1977, Mexico), fiction wr. & poet
- Shakuntala Baliarsingh (b. 1948, India) wr. & translator
- Ona Baliukonė (1948–2007, Lithuania), poet & painter
- Rabia Balkhi (10th century, Iran/Persia), poet
- Zsófia Balla (b. 1949, Romania/Hungary), poet & es.
- Philippa Ballantine (b. 1971, New Zealand/United States), fiction wr.
- Solvej Balle (b. 1962, Denmark), nv. & radio pw.
- Inés Ballester (b. 1958, Spain), col. & cookery wr.
- Ada Ballin (1863–1906, England), wr. & col.
- Ingmāra Balode (b. 1981, Latvia), poet
- Mary Balogh (b. 1944, Wales), nv.
- Jelena Balšić (1365/1366–1443, Serbia), epistle wr.
- Toni Cade Bambara (1939–1995, United States), wr., activist & academic
- Mary Ellen Bamford (1857–1946, United States), wr.
- Consort Ban (Ban Jieyu, Lady Pan, 班婕妤, c. 48 – c. 6 BC, China), scholar & poet
- Linda Vero Ban (b. 1976, Hungary), wr. on Jewishness
- Ban Zhao (班昭, 45–116 AD, China), first female Chinese historian
- Zsófia Bán (b. 1957, Brazil/Hungary), wr. & critic in Hungarian
- Carmen-Francesca Banciu (b. 1955, Romania), nv. & academic
- Marie-Claire Bancquart (1932–2019, France), poet, es. & academic
- Ellen Banda-Aaku (b. 1965, Zambia), fiction & ch. wr.
- Teresa Bandettini (1763–1837, Italy), poet & ballerina
- Helen Elliott Bandini (1854–1912, United States), history wr.
- Faith Bandler (1918–2015, Australia), wr. & activist
- Mariko Bando (坂東眞理子, b. 1946, Japan), social wr. & critic
- Sushmita Banerjee (1963/1964–2013, India), wr. & activist
- Mary Jo Bang (b. 1946, United States), poet
- Rakhshān Banietemad (b. 1954, Iran/Persia), screenwriter
- Banine (1905–1992, Azerbaijan/France), current affairs wr.
- Zsuzsa Bánk (b. 1965, Germany), nv.
- Dot Banks (1885–1953, United Kingdom), non-f. wr.
- Leslie Esdaile Banks (1959–2011, United States), wr.
- Maya Banks (living, United States), romance wr.
- Anne Bannerman (1765–1829, Scotland), poet
- Helen Bannerman (1862–1946, Scotland), ch. wr.; Little Black Sambo
- Tristane Banon (b. 1979, France), nv. & es.
- Rashmi Bansal (living, India), non-f. wr.
- Anna Banti (1895–1985, Italy), fiction wr. & autobiographer
- Bao Junhui (鮑君徽, fl. late 8th century AD, China), poet
- Bao Linghui (鲍令晖, fl. mid-5th century AD, China), poet
- Anni Baobei (励婕, b. 1974, China), nv.
- Amina Baraka (b. 1942, United States), poet & activist
- Iqbal Baraka (b. 1942, Egypt), fiction & social wr.
- Hoda Barakat (b. 1952, Lebanon/France), nv.
- Ibtisam Barakat (b. 1962, Palestine), poet, mem. & ch. wr.
- Najwa Barakat (b. 1966, Lebanon), nv. & film director
- Barbara Baraldi (living, Italy), nv.
- Agnieszka Baranowska (1819–1890, Poland), pw. & poet
- Jadwiga Barańska (1935–2024, Poland), screenwriter & actor
- Natalya Baranskaya (1908–2004, Soviet Union), wr.
- Maria Barbal (b. 1949, Spain), nv. & ch. wr.
- Giuseppa Barbapiccola (1702 – c. 1740, Italy), natural philosopher & poet
- Bárbara de Santo Domingo (1842–1872, Spain), mystic wr.
- Teresa Giménez Barbat (b. 1955, Spain), anthropologist
- Anna Laetitia Barbauld (1743–1825, England), poet, es. & ch. wr.
- Aja Barber, (United States), non-f. & nv.
- Margaret Barber (Michael Fairless, 1869–1901, England), nv. & ch. wr.
- Mary Barber (c. 1685 – c. 1765, Ireland), poet
- Ros Barber (b. 1964, England), nv. & poet
- Muriel Barbery (b. 1969, Morocco/France), nv. & academic
- Teresita de Barbieri (1937–2018, Uruguay/Mexico), non-f. wr., feminist sociologist
- Maria Tore Barbina (1940–2007, Italy), poet & translator
- Elia Barceló (b. 1957, Spain/Austria/Austria-Hungary), nv., ch. wr. & academic
- Alex Barclay (b. 1974, Ireland), crime wr.
- Florence L. Barclay (1862–1921, England), fiction wr.
- Leigh Bardugo (b. 1975, United States), young adult & fantasy wr.
- Leland Bardwell (1922–2016, Ireland), poet, nv. & pw.
- Ilse Barea-Kulcsar (1902–1973, Austria), nv., translator & journalist
- Joan Barfoot (b. 1946, Canada), nv.
- Serie Barford (living, New Zealand), poet & fiction wr.
- Simone Le Bargy (1877–1985, France), woman of letters
- Arvède Barine (1840–1908, France), wr. & historian
- Mary Anne Barker (1831–1911, Jamaica/England), col. & poet
- Nicola Barker (b. 1966, England), fiction wr.
- Pat Barker (b. 1943, England), nv.
- Susan Barker (b. 1978, England), nv.
- Anna Barkova (1901–1976, Soviet Union), poet, pw. & fiction wr.
- Jane Barlow (1856–1917, Ireland), nv. & poet
- Marjorie Barnard (with M. Barnard Eldershaw, 1897–1987, Australia), nv. & historian
- Mary Barnard (1909–2001, United States), poet & biographer
- Maria Barnas (b. 1973, Netherlands), nv., poet & artist
- Annie Maria Barnes (1857–1933/1943, United States), col., editor & wr.
- Djuna Barnes (1892–1982, United States), wr.
- Margaret Ayer Barnes (1886–1967, United States), wr.
- Annie Wall Barnett (1859–1942, United States), wr. & poet
- Natalie Clifford Barney (1876–1972, United States/France), pw., poet & nv.
- María Dámasa Jova Baró (1890–1940, Cuba), wr. & feminist
- Carmen Baroja (1883–1950, Spain), wr. & poet
- Ana Baron (1950–2015, Argentina), wr. & col.
- Odile Baron Supervielle (1915–2016, Uruguay/Argentina), wr., journalist
- Evangeline Barongo (living, Uganda), ch. wr.
- Linda Maria Baros (b. 1981, Romania/France), poet & critic in French
- Amelia Edith Huddleston Barr (1831–1919, England), nv.
- Lisa Barr (living, United States), historical fiction wr. & journalist
- Miriam Barr (b. 1982, New Zealand), poet
- Emma de la Barra (1861–1947, Argentina), nv.
- Emma Barrandeguy (1914–2006, Argentina), poet, storyteller & pw.
- Sarah Maria Barraud (c. 1923–1995, England/New Zealand), homemaker & correspondent
- Maria Isabel Barreno (1939–2016, Portugal), wr.
- Beatriz Peniche Barrera (1893–1976, Mexico), poet & feminist
- Andrea Barrett (b. 1954, United States), fiction wr.
- Lynne Barrett (living, United States), fiction wr. & editor
- Rachel Barrett (1874–1953, Wales), editor & suffragette
- Margaret Barrington (1896–1982, Ireland), fiction & social wr.
- María Esperanza Barrios (1892–1932, Uruguay), political wr.
- Nuria Barrios (b. 1962, Spain), poet, fiction & non-f. wr.
- Pía Barros (b. 1956, Chile), fiction wr.
- Rachel Barrowman (b. 1963, New Zealand), historian & biographer
- Lalo Barrubia (b. 1967, Uruguay), poet & fiction wr.
- Angela Barry (living, Bermuda), wr. & educator
- Alicia Giménez Bartlett (b. 1951, Spain), nv.
- Agniya Barto (1906–1981, Russia/Soviet Union), poet & ch. wr.
- Charlotte Barton (1797–1867, Australia), ch. wr. & educator
- Emily Mary Barton (1817–1909, Australia), poet
- Violet Barungi (b. 1943, Uganda), wr. & editor
- Mildred Barya (living, Uganda), poet
- Anabela Basalo (b. 1972, Serbia), fiction wr.
- Ada Lee Bascom (1862/1863–1928, United States), novelist & playwright
- Miryana Basheva (1947–2020, Bulgaria), poet
- Marie Bashkirtseff (1858–1884, Russia/France), diarist & artist
- Jeanine Basinger (b. 1936, United States), non-f. wr. & academic
- Talat Bassari (1923–2020, Iran/Persia), poet, feminist & academic
- Marnie Bassett (1890–1980, Australia), historian & biographer
- Laura Bassi (1711–1778, Italy), physicist & academic
- Angèle Bassolé-Ouédraogo (b. 1967, Ivory Coast/Canada/Newfoundland), poet
- Julia Bastin (1888–1968, Belgium), academic & nv. in French
- Marjolein Bastin (b. 1943, Netherlands), nature & ch. wr. & illustrator
- Bani Basu (b. 1939, India), es. & poet
- Purabi Basu (b. 1949, Bangladesh), fiction wr. & activist
- Fira Basuki (b. 1972, Indonesia), nv.
- Felisa Batacan (living, Philippines), nv.
- Jackee Budesta Batanda (living, Uganda), col. & wr.
- Allie Bates (b. 1957, United States), wr.
- Clara Nettie Bates (1876–1966, United States), ed. & wr.
- Daisy Bates (1859–1951, Australia), anthropologist
- Katharine Lee Bates (1859–1929, United States), songwriter
- Margret Holmes Bates (1844–1927, United States), nv., poet, short story wr., non-f.
- Octavia Williams Bates (1846–1911, United States), suffragist, clubwoman & wr.
- Catherine Bateson (b. 1960, Australia), nv. & poet
- Janet Bathgate (c. 1806–1898, Scotland), autobiographer
- Najmieh Batmanglij (b. 1947, Iran/Persia/United States), chef & cookery wr.
- Eileen Battersby (c. 1958–2018, Ireland), critic
- Henrietta Battier (c. 1751–1813, Ireland), poet & satirist
- Laura Battiferri (1523–1589, Italy), poet
- Effie T. Battle (c. 1882 – post-1940, United States), poet & educator
- Dawn-Michelle Baude (b. 1959, United States), poet, col. & educator
- Emma Pow Bauder (1848–1932, United States), nv.
- Baudonivia (fl. c. 600, France), wr. in Latin
- Blanche Baughan (1870–1958, New Zealand), poet & penal reformer
- Marguerite Baulu (1870–1942, Belgium), nv. in French
- Vicki Baum (1888–1960, Austria/Austria-Hungary), nv.
- Sara Baume (b. 1984, Ireland), nv.
- Gertrud Bäumer (1873–1954, Germany), wr. & feminist
- Josephine Penfield Cushman Bateham (1829–1901, United States), social reformer, ed. & wr.
- Lualhati Bautista (1945–2023, Philippines), nv.
- Sophie Bawr (1773–1860, France), wr., pw. & composer
- Anna Dawbin (1816–1905, Australia), diarist
- Mary Temple Bayard (1853–1916, United States), wr. & journalist
- Oya Baydar (b. 1940, Turkey/Ottoman Empire), fiction wr. & sociologist
- Ada Ellen Bayly (Edna Lyall, 1857–1903, England), nv.
- Barbara Baynton (1857–1929, Australia), fiction wr.
- Molly Baz (b. 1988, United States), chef & cookery wr.
- Emilia Pardo Bazán (1851–1921, Spain), es. & nv.
- Nura Bazdulj-Hubijar (b. 1951, Yugoslavia/Bosnia-Herzegovina), wr., poet & pw.
- Lesley Beake (b. 1949, Scotland/South Africa), ch. wr.
- Anne Beale (1816–1900, Wales), nv. & poet
- Annie O'Meara de Vic Beamish (1883–1969, Ireland/Switzerland), wr. & pw.
- Beatrice of Nazareth (c. 1200–1268, Netherlands), Cistercian & early wr. in Dutch
- Cari Beauchamp (1949–2023, United States), non-f. writer & journalist
- Louisa Beaufort (1781–1863, Ireland), wr. & antiquarian
- Fanny de Beauharnais (1737–1813, France), lady of letters & salonnière
- Aletta Beaujon (1933–2001, Curaçao), poet
- Fleur Beale (b. 1945, New Zealand), YA wr.
- Margaret Beames (1935–2016, New Zealand), ch. wr.
- Clara Bancroft Beatley (1858–1923, United States), wr., compiler
- Mercedes Bengoechea (b. 1952, Spain), sociolinguist, non-f. wr.
- Betty Bentley Beaumont (1828–1892, England), wr.
- Jeanne-Marie Leprince de Beaumont (1711–1780, France), story & non-f. wr.
- Airini Beautrais (b. 1982, New Zealand), poet
- Emily Elizabeth Shaw Beavan (1818–1897, Ireland/Australia), poet & fiction wr.
- Simone de Beauvoir (1908–1986, France), wr. & philosopher
- Dany Bébel-Gisler (1935–2003, Guadeloupe), nv.
- Bruna Beber (b. 1984, Brazil), poet & wr.
- Olga Mihaylovna Bebutova (1879–1952, Russia/France), nv. & actor
- Lola Beccaria (b. 1963, Spain), nv. & screenwriter
- Ángela Becerra (b. 1957, Comoros), poet & nv.
- Margaret Bechard (b. 1953, United States), ch. wr.
- Alison Bechdel (b. 1960, United States), cartoonist & mem.
- Mimí Bechelani (living, Mexico), TV screenwriter & poet
- Béatrix Beck (1914–2008, Switzerland/France), nv. in French
- Alice Becker-Ho (b. 1941, China/France), non-f. wr. & poet
- Mary Beckett (1926–2013, Northern Ireland), radio pw. & fiction wr.
- Thea Beckman (1923–2004, Netherlands), ch. wr.
- Claude de Bectoz (1490–1547, France), wr. & philosopher
- Malati Bedekar (1905–2001, India), fiction wr.
- Jean Bedford (1946–2025, Australia), fiction wr.
- Ruth Bedford (1882–1963, Australia), poet, pw. & ch. wr.
- Simi Bedford (living, Nigeria/England), nv.
- Sybille Bedford (1911–2006, Germany/England), fiction & non-f. wr.
- Yolanda Bedregal (1916–1999, Bolivia), poet & nv.
- Patricia Beer (1919–1999, England), poet & critic
- Isabella Beeton (1836–1865, England), domestic wr.; Mrs Beeton's Book of Household Management
- Anne Beffort (1880–1966, Luxembourg), critic & biographer
- Jana Begum (fl. 17th century, India), scholar
- Ruth Behar (b. 1956, Cuba/United States), anthropologist
- Simin Behbahani (1927–2014, Iran/Persia), poet & activist
- Aphra Behn (1640–1689, England), pw., poet & nv.
- Mariam Behnam (1921–2014, Iran/Persia/Emirates), nv. & autobiographer
- Larissa Behrendt (b. 1969, Australia), legal academic & nv.
- Maria Beig (1920–2018, Germany), nv. & educator
- Géraldine Beigbeder (living, France), nv. & screenwriter
- Sara Beirão (1880–1974, Portugal), ch. & YA wr. & activist

=== Bej–Bj ===
- Hélé Béji (b. 1948, Tunisia), nv. & es.
- Nazan Bekiroğlu (b. 1957, Turkey/Ottoman Empire), nv. & academic
- Hafsa Bekri (b. 1948, Morocco), poet & fiction wr.
- Maria Belakhova (1903–1969, Russia/Soviet Union), ch. wr. & educator
- Cristina Trivulzio Belgiojoso (1808–1871, Italy), political wr.
- Valerie Belgrave (1946–2016, Trinidad), wr. & artist
- Souhayr Belhassen (b. 1943, Tunisia), activist & biographer
- Concepción Silva Belinzon (1903–1987, Uruguay), wr.
- Diane Bell (b. 1943, Australia), anthropologist
- Hilary Bell (b. 1966, Australia), pw.
- Susan Groag Bell (1926–2015, Czechoslovakia/Czech Republic/United States), women's studies and autobiographer
- Vera Bell (1904–1984, Jamaica/England), poet, fiction wr. & pw.
- Maud de Belleroche (1922–2017, France), nv.
- Diana Bellessi (b. 1946, Argentina), poet & es.
- Gioconda Belli (b. 1948, Nicaragua), revolutionary & wr.
- Samira Bellil (1972–2004, France), autobiographer
- Carolina Bello (b. 1983, Uruguay), fiction wr.
- Louise Swanton Belloc (1796–1881, France), translator
- Loleh Bellon (1925–1999, France), pw. & actor
- Yannick Bellon (1924–2019, France), screenwriter & film director
- Nassira Belloula (b. 1961, Algeria/Canada/Newfoundland), wr. in French
- Jelica Belović-Bernadzikowska (1870–1946, Austria/Austria-Hungary/Yugoslavia), wr. & ethnographer
- Vizma Belševica (1931–2005, Latvia), poet & autobiographer
- Myriam Ben (1928–2001, Algeria/France), poet, fiction wr. & painter
- Margot Benary-Isbert (1889–1979, Germany/United States), ch. wr. in German & English
- Siham Benchekroun (living, Morocco), poet & fiction wr.
- Rajae Benchemsi (b. 1957, Morocco), poet
- Esther Bendahan (b. 1964, Morocco/Spain), wr. in Spanish
- Augusta Bender (1846–1924, Germany), writer, poet, activist
- Karen E. Bender (living, United States), nv.
- Rigmor Stampe Bendix (1850–1923, Denmark), biographer
- Emma Lee Benedict (1857–1937, United States), editor, educator & wr.
- Hester A. Benedict (1838–1921, United States), poet & wr.
- Victoria Benedictsson (1850–1888, Sweden), nv.
- Maria Beneyto (1925–2011, Spain), poet
- Božena Benešová (1873–1936, Austria/Austria-Hungary/Czechoslovakia/Czech Republic), poet, fiction wr. & pw.
- Sokhna Benga (b. 1967, Senegal), nv. & poet
- Elizabeth Benger (1775–1827, England), nv. & biographer
- Seyla Benhabib (b. 1950, Turkey/Ottoman Empire/United States), political philosopher
- Nouria Benghabrit-Remaoun (b. 1952, Algeria), sociologist & politician
- Elisa Beni (b. 1964, Spain), social wr., col. & nv.
- Berthe Bénichou-Aboulker (1888–1942, Algeria), poet & pw.
- Anna Maria Bennett (c. 1750–1808, Wales), nv.
- Louie Bennett (1870–1956, Ireland), wr. & suffragette
- Louise Bennett-Coverley (1919–2006, Jamaica), poet & educator
- Mary Montgomerie Bennett (1881–1961, Australia), biographer & rights advocate
- Veronica Bennett (b. 1953, England), ch. nv.
- Gwendolyn B. Bennett (1902–1981, United States), wr.
- Louise Bennett (1919–2006, Jamaica), poet & folklorist
- Khnata Bennouna (b. 1940, Morocco), fiction wr.
- Nel Benschop (1918–2005, Netherlands), poet
- Mary Crowell Van Benschoten (1840–1921, United States), wr., newspaper pub. & ed.
- Sihem Bensedrine (b. 1950, Tunisia), non-f.
- Carol Bensimon (b. 1982, Brazil), fiction wr.
- Nettie Lee Benson (1905–1993, United States), archivist & historian
- Sally Benson (1897–1972, United States), screenwriter & fiction wr.
- Caroline French Benton (died 1923, United States), cookery wr.
- Juliette Benzoni (1920–2016, France), fiction wr. & screenwriter
- Nina Berberova (1901–1993, Russia/France), fiction wr.
- Lydia Berdyaev (1871–1945, Russia/France), poet
- Amanda Berenguer (1921–2010, Uruguay), poet
- Josefa Berens-Totenohl (1891–1969, Germany), nv.
- Maimu Berg (b. 1945, Estonia), wr. & critic
- Sibylle Berg (b. 1968, Switzerland), fiction wr., es. & pw. in German
- Charlotta Berger (1784–1852, Sweden), fiction wr. & poet
- Olga Bergholz (1910–1975, Russia/Soviet Union), poet, pw. & ch. wr.
- Tara Bergin (b. 1974, Ireland), poet
- Anne-Marie Berglund (1952–2020, Sweden), poet, fiction wr. & artist
- Kersti Bergroth (1886–1975, Finland), wr. & pw.
- Elisabeth Bergstrand-Poulsen (1887–1955, Sweden), wr. & illustrator
- Gunilla Bergström (1942–2021, Sweden), ch. wr. & illustrator
- Aimée Daniell Beringer (1856–1936, United States), pw. & nv.
- Sara Berkeley (b. 1967, Ireland), poet
- Ulla Berkéwicz (b. 1948, Germany), fiction wr. & es.
- Alexandra Berková (1949–2008, Czechoslovakia/Czech Republic), fiction wr. & educator
- Lucia Berlin (1936–2004, United States), short story wr.
- Giuliana Berlinguer (1933–2014, Italy), screenwriter & nv.
- Sabina Berman (b. 1955, Mexico), fiction wr. & col.
- Mònica Bernabé (b. 1972, Spain), col. & wr.
- Catherine Bernard (1662–1712, France), poet, pw. & nv.
- Gabrielle Bernard (1893–1963, Belgium), poet in French
- Patricia Bernard (b. 1942, Australia), fiction wr.
- Tati Bernardi (b. 1979, Brazil), fiction & screenwriter
- Paulette Bernège (1896–1973, France), household & non-f. wr.
- Juliana Berners (14th & 15th centuries, England), wr. on medieval pursuits
- Emmanuèle Bernheim (1955–2017, France), screenplay wr. & nv.
- Jovette Bernier (1900–1981, Canada/Newfoundland), col., nv., & poet
- Elsa Bernstein (1866–1949, Austria/Austria-Hungary), pw. & account of Theresienstadt concentration camp
- Rose Berryl (b. 1982, Belgium), fantasy wr. in French
- Bertice Berry (b. 1960, United States), sociologist, wr. & educator
- Julie Berry (b. 1974, United States), ch. & YA wr.
- Mei-mei Berssenbrugge (白萱华, b. 1947, China/United States), poet & pw.
- Louise Bertin (1905–1977, France), poet & composer
- Michelle Suárez Bértora (1983–2022, Uruguay), social wr.
- Aurora Bertrana (1892–1974, Spain), fiction wr.
- Betty Berzon (1928–2006, United States), wr.
- Annie Besant (1847–1933, England), theosophist & activist
- Elsa Beskow (1874–1953, Sweden), ch. wr. & illustrator
- Agustina Bessa-Luís (1922–2019, Portugal), fiction & non-f. wr.
- Bessora (b. 1968, Belgium), fiction wr. in French
- Eva Best (1851–1925, United States), ss. wr., poet, dramatist
- Mireille Best (1943–2005, France), fiction wr.
- Mary Matilda Betham (1776–1852, England), diarist, poet & woman of letters
- Matilda Betham-Edwards (1836–1919, England), nv., poet & travel wr.
- Marion Bethel (b. 1953, Bahamas), poet & activist
- Nicolette Bethel (living, Bahamas), wr. & anthropologist
- Ursula Bethell (1874–1945, England/New Zealand), poet
- Kata Bethlen (1700–1759, Hungary), mem.
- Doris Betts (1932–2012, United States), fiction wr. & es.
- Jean Betts (living, England/New Zealand), pw. & actor
- Dricky Beukes (1918–1999, South Africa), fiction & radio drama wr. in Afrikaans
- Lauren Beukes (b. 1976, South Africa), fiction wr. & television screenwriter in English
- Maja Beutler (1936–2021, Switzerland), fiction wr. in German
- Cvetka Bevc (b. 1960, Yugoslavia/Slovenia), poet & prose & ch. wr.
- Elizabeth Beverley (fl. 1815–30, England), pamphleteer
- L. S. Bevington (1845–1895, England), poet, anarchist & es.
- Maïssa Bey (b. 1950, Algeria), wr. & educator
- Drusilla Beyfus (1927–2026, England), non-f.
- Niloofar Beyzaie (b. 1967, Iran/Persia), pw.
- Zdeňka Bezděková (1907–1999, Austria/Austria-Hungary/Czechoslovakia/Czech Republic), fiction & non-f. wr.
- Sheila Bhatia (1916–2008, India), poet & pw.
- Sujata Bhatt (b. 1956, India), poet
- Rajlukshmee Debee Bhattacharya (1927–2005, India), poet & critic
- Suchitra Bhattacharya (1950–2011, India), nv.
- Fatima Bhutto (b. 1982, Afghanistan/Pakistan), nv. & social wr.
- Ewa Białołęcka (b. 1967, Poland), fiction wr.
- Matilde Bianchi (1927–1991, Uruguay), critic
- Angela Bianchini (1921–2018, Italy), fiction wr. & critic
- Elizabeth Bibesco (1897–1945, England), wr.
- Marthe Bibesco (1886–1973, Romania/France), wr. in French
- Nina Bichuya (b. 1937, Ukraine), nv. & ch. wr.
- Hester Biddle (c. 1629–1697, England), Quaker pamphleteer
- Elizabeth Biddulph, Baroness Biddulph (1834–1916, England), non-f. w. & Woman of the Bedchamber to Queen Victoria
- Ruth Bidgood (1922–2022, Wales), poet
- Agnieszka Biedrzycka (living, Poland), historian
- Dorothea Biehl (1731–1788, Denmark), pw.
- Nella Bielski (1930s–2020, Ukraine/France), wr. & actor
- Gisèle Bienne (b. 1946, France), nv.
- Linda Bierds (b. 1945, United States), poet & professor
- Carli Biessels (1936–2016, Netherlands), ch. wr.
- Alberta Bigagli (1928–2017, Italy), psychologist & poet
- Ella A. Bigelow (1849–1917, United States), author
- Lettie S. Bigelow (1849–1906, United States), poet and author
- Barbara Biggs (b. 1956, Australia), wr. & campaigner
- Juana Bignozzi (1937–2015, Argentina), poet & translator
- Anna Bijns (1493–1575, Flanders), humanism in Dutch & French
- Elisheva Bikhovski (1888–1949, Russia/Israel), poet, critic & translator
- Üstün Bilgen-Reinart (b. 1947, Turkey/Ottoman Empire/Canada/Newfoundland), non-f. wr.
- Shahbano Bilgrami (living, Pakistan/United States), poet & es.
- S. Corinna Bille (1912–1979, Switzerland), nv. & poet in French
- Raphaële Billetdoux (b. 1951, France), nv.
- Eva Billow (1902–1993, Sweden), ch. wr. & illustrator
- Natalka Bilotserkivets (b. 1954, Ukraine), poet
- Maeve Binchy (1939–2012, Ireland), fiction wr., pw. & col.
- Ama Biney (b. 1960s, England), historian & journalist
- Bing Xin (冰心, 1900–1999, China), fiction & ch. wr.
- Hildegard of Bingen (1098–1179 Germany), mystic, pw. & poet in Latin
- Jennie M. Bingham (1859–1933, United States), fiction & non-f. wr.
- Dörthe Binkert (b. 1949, Germany), fiction & non-f. wr.
- Judith Binney (1940–2011, New Zealand), historian & academic
- Carol Birch (b. 1951, England), nv.
- Charlotte Birch-Pfeiffer (c. 1800–1868, Germany), pw. & actor
- Christina Regina von Birchenbaum (fl. 17th century, Finland), poet
- Carmel Bird (b. 1940, Australia), fiction wr.
- Hera Lindsay Bird (b. 1987, New Zealand), poet
- Isabella Bird (1831–1904, England), traveller & wr.
- Poldy Bird (1941–2018), Argentina), poet & es.
- Sandra Birdsell (b. 1942, Canada/Newfoundland), fiction wr.
- Anne Birk (1942–2009, Germany), nv., history wr. & pw.
- Winifred Birkett (1897–1975, Australia), nv. & poet
- Becky Birtha (b. 1948, United States), poet & ch. wr.
- Dora Birtles (1903–1992, Australia), fiction wr., poet & travel wr.
- Anne Bishop (living, United States), fantasy nv.
- Eleanor Bishop (director) (New Zealand), playwright
- Elizabeth Bishop (1911–1979, United States), poet & wr.
- Emily Montague Mulkin Bishop (1858–1916, United States), wr.
- Jacqueline Bishop (living, Jamaica), wr., artist & photographer
- Yael Bitrán (b. 1965, Chile/Mexico), non-f. wr.
- Zoubeida Bittari (b. 1939, Algeria), wr.
- Adriana Bittel (b. 1946, Romania), critic & fiction wr.
- Isidora Bjelica (1967–2020, Serbia), wr. & pw.
- Marie Bjelke-Petersen (1874–1969, Australia), nv.
- Bryndís Björgvinsdóttir (b. 1982, Iceland), wr. & folklorist
- Christina Björk (b. 1938, Sweden), wr. & ch. book wr.
- Anna Svanhildur Björnsdóttir (b. 1948, Iceland), writer & educator
- Sigrún Edda Björnsdóttir (b. 1958, Iceland), writer & actor
- Louise Bjørnsen (1824–1899, Denmark), fiction wr.

=== Bl–Br ===
- Clementina Black (1853–1922, England), nv. & political wr.
- Mary Fleming Black (1848–1893, United States), wr. & religious worker
- Emily Lucas Blackall (1832–1892, United States), wr. & philanthropist
- Sarah Blackborow (fl. 1650s–1660s, England), Quaker wr. & preacher
- E. Owens Blackburne (1848–1894, Ireland), wr. & nv.
- Malorie Blackman (b. 1962, Barbados/England), ch. & YA fiction wr. & pw.
- Anauta Blackmore (c. 1890–1965, Canada), memoirist, YA
- Ellen Blackwell (1864–1952, England/New Zealand), botanist
- Sara Blædel (b. 1964, Denmark), crime wr.
- Isa Blagden (1816/1817–1873, England/Italy), nv. & poet
- Marina Blagojević (1958–2020, Serbia), wr. on gender
- Georgia Blain (1964–2016, Australia), nv., col. & biographer
- Suessa Baldridge Blaine (1860–1932, United States), wr.
- Marie-Claire Blais (1939–2021, Canada/Newfoundland), nv., poet, & pw.
- Inés Joyes y Blake (1731–1808, Spain), Enlightenment wr.
- Jan Blake (fl. 1988, UK), storyteller and wr.
- Anna Blaman (1905–1960, Netherlands), nv. & poet
- Susanna Blamire (1747–1794, England), poet
- Neltje Blanchan (1865–1918, United States), nature wr.
- Augustine-Malvina Blanchecotte (1830–1897, France), poet
- Carmen Blanco (b. 1954, Spain), feminist wr.
- Carmen Blanco y Trigueros (ca. 1840–1921, Spain), wr., poet, journalist
- Yolanda Blanco (b. 1954, Nicaragua), poet
- Ana Blandiana (b. 1942, Romania), poet & es.
- I. M. E. Blandin (1838–1912, United States), non-f. wr.
- Stella Blandy (1836–1925, France), woman of letters & feminist
- Arapera Hineira Kaa Blank (1932–2002, New Zealand), poet & educator
- Carla Blank (living, United States), wr., editor & educator
- Clair Blank (1915–1965, United States), mystery wr.
- Evangeline Wilbour Blashfield (1858–1918, United States), nv. & nf. writer
- Barbara Blaugdone (c. 1609–1705, England), Quaker autobiographer
- Helena Blavatsky (1831–1891, Russia), theosophist & mystic
- Jaroslava Blažková (1933–2017, Czechoslovakia/Czech Republic/Slovakia), fiction & ch. wr.
- Emily Rose Bleby (1849–1917, Jamaica/UK), nf. wr.
- Ann Eliza Bleecker (1752–1783, United States), poet & correspondent
- Marguerite Gardiner, Countess of Blessington (1789–1849, Ireland), nv. & hostess
- Audrey Blignault (1916–2008, South Africa), es. in Afrikaans
- Ellen-Sylvia Blind (1925–2009, Sweden), poet & mem. in Sami
- Eliot Bliss (1903–1990, Jamaica/England), nv. & poet
- Karen Blixen (1885–1962, Denmark/Kenya), wr.
- Francesca Lia Block (b. 1962, United States), wr.
- Marion Bloem (b. 1952, Netherlands), wr. & film-maker
- Barbara Bloemink (b. 1953, United States), art historian
- Anni Blomqvist (1909–1990, Finland), nv. in Swedish
- Gertrude Elizabeth Blood (1857–1911, Ireland), wr. & pw.
- Amy Bloom (b. 1953, United States), nv., non-f. wr. & psychotherapist
- Minerva Bloom (b. 1959, Mexico/United States), poet in Spanish & English
- Valerie Bloom (b. 1956, Jamaica), poet & nv.
- Amelia Bloomer (1818–1894, United States), wr. on women's rights & temperance
- Andrée Blouin (1921–1986, Central African Republic), activist & wr.
- Elizabeth Blower (c. 1757/1763 – post-1816, England), nv.
- Antonina Bludova (1813–1891, Russia), salonnière & mem.
- Ana Cecilia Blum (b. 1972, Ecuador), wr.
- Liliana V. Blum (b. 1974, Mexico), fiction wr.
- Judy Blume (b. 1938, United States), nv.
- Yde Schloenbach Blumenschein (Colombina, 1882–1963, Brazil), poet & chronicler
- Ilse Blumenthal-Weiss (1899–1987, Germany/United States), poet & Hc. survivor
- Louise Sophie Blussé (1901–1996, Netherlands), religious wr.
- Enid Blyton (1897–1968, England), ch. wr.
- Capel Boake, (Doris Boake Kerr, 1889–1944, Australia), nv.
- Margarita Bobba (fl. 1560, Italy), wr. & poet
- Marilyn Bobes (b. 1955, Cuba), poet, nv. & critic
- Merlinda Bobis (b. 1959, Philippines/Australia), wr. & academic
- Irena Bobowska (1920–1942, Poland), poet & wartime victim
- Jacqueline Fatima Bocoum (living, Senegal), nv. & col.
- Cecil Bødker (1927–2020, Denmark), YA wr. & poet
- Imma von Bodmershof (1895–1982, Austria/Austria-Hungary), poet
- Liliana Bodoc (1958–2018, Argentina), nv.
- Milica Bodrožić (living, Serbia), political history wr.
- Anna Böeseken (1905–1997, South Africa), historian in English
- Janka Boga (1886–1963, Hungary), wr. & pw.
- Louise Bogan (1897–1970, United States), poet
- Henrietta Boggs (1918–2020, United States/Costa Rica), author & activist
- Graciela Bográn (1896–2000, Honduras), es.
- Katalin Bogyay (b. 1956, Hungary), biographer & politician
- Helene Böhlau (1859–1940, Germany), nv.
- Margarete Böhme (1867–1939, Germany), nv.
- Laura Papo Bohoreta (1891–1942, Turkey/Ottoman Empire/Yugoslavia), wr. on Judaism
- Lucie Boissonnas (1839–1877, France), biog.
- Montserrat Boix (b. 1960, Spain), feminist wr.
- Barbara Bojarska (living, Poland), historian
- Berta Bojetu (1946–1997, Yugoslavia/Slovenia), poet & nv.
- Eavan Boland (1944–2020, Ireland/United States), poet & academic
- Sophie Bolander (1807–1869, Sweden), nv.
- Anna Bolavá (b. 1981), nv. & poet
- Emily Bold (b. 1980), adult & YA nv.
- Catherine of Bologna (1413–1463, Italy), religious wr. & saint
- Isabel Bolton (1883–1975, United States), nv.
- Sarah Knowles Bolton (1841–1916, United States), wr.
- Natella Boltyanskaya (b. 1965, Soviet Union/Russia), poet & songwriter
- María Luisa Bombal (1910–1980, Chile), wr.
- Erma Bombeck (1927–1996, United States), humorist
- Son Bo-mi (선보미, b. 1980, Korea), nv.
- Simona Bonafé (b. 1973, Italy), politician
- Marie Bonaparte-Wyse (1831–1902, France), wr. & hostess
- Annie B. Bond (b. 1953, United States), wr. & editor
- Chrystelle Trump Bond (1938–2020), United States), dance historian
- Cynthia Bond (b. 1961, United States), nv.
- Pilar Bonet (b. 1952, Spain), political wr.
- Maria Boniecka (1910–1978, Poland), educator & political wr.
- Mildred Amanda Baker Bonham (1840–1907, United States), traveler & col.
- Tanella Boni (b. 1954, Ivory Coast), poet & nv.
- Veronica Bonilla (b. 1962, Ecuador), ch. wr. & illustrator
- Laudomia Bonanni (1907–2002, Italy), fiction wr.
- Elizabeth Anne Bonner (1924–1981, United States), fiction wr. & poet
- Geraldine Bonner (1870–1930, United States), wr.
- Marita Bonner (1899–1971, United States), wr., es. & pw.
- Piedad Bonnett (b. 1951, Comoros), poet, pw. & nv.
- Teresina Bontempi (1883–1968, Switzerland/Italy), political wr. & diarist in Italian
- Cedella Booker (1926–2008, Jamaica), biographer & singer
- Malika Booker (b. 1970, England), poet, wr. & artist
- Paula Boock (b. 1964, New Zealand), fiction & screenwriter
- Mary Everest Boole (1832–1916, England), wr.
- Frances Boothby (fl. c. 1669–1670, England), pw.
- Alice Borchardt (1939–2007, United States), fiction wr.
- Itxaro Borda (b. 1959, France), novelist, poet
- Ivonne Bordelois (b. 1934, Argentina), poet & es.
- Nirmal Prabha Bordoloi (1932/1933–2004, India), poet & folklorist
- Miriam Borgenicht (1915−1992, United States), mystery nv.
- Norah Borges (1901–1998), poet & illustrator
- Martina Barros Borgoño (1850–1944, Chile), feminist wr.
- Maria Selvaggia Borghini (1656–1731, Italy), poet
- Alicia Borinsky (fl. since 1975, Argentina), nv., poet & critic
- Elsa Bornemann (1952–2013, Argentina), ch. wr.
- Jenny Bornholdt (b. 1960, New Zealand), poet & anthologist
- Chasia Bornstein-Bielicka (1921–2012), Polish-born Israeli writer
- Marina Boroditskaya (b. 1954, Soviet Union/Russia), ch. poet
- Rosario Ustáriz Borra (1927–2009, Spain), poet in Aragonese
- Juana Borrero (1877–1896, Cuba), juvenile poet & painter
- Paloma Gómez Borrero (1934–2017, Spain), wr.
- Inés Bortagaray (b. 1975, Uruguay), screenwriter
- Marianne Boruch (b. 1950, United States), poet & professor
- Anica Bošković (1714–1804, Dalmatia/Ragusa/Serbia), wr. & poet
- Anna Louisa Geertruida Bosboom-Toussaint (1912–1986, Netherlands), nv.
- Käthe Bosse-Griffiths (1910–1998, Germany/Wales), archaeologist
- Louise de Bossigny (died 1700, France), salonnière & fairy-tale wr.
- Nora Bossong (b. 1982, Germany), poet, nv. & es.
- Nuria C. Botey (b. 1977, Spain), nv.
- Calypso Botez (1880–1933, Romania), feminist wr.
- Anne Lynch Botta (1815–1891, United States), poet, wr. & teacher
- Vera Botterbusch (b. 1942, Germany), wr. & poet
- Phyllis Bottome (1884–1963, England), fiction wr.
- Messaouda Boubaker (b. 1954, Tunisia), fiction wr.
- Huguette Bouchardeau (1935–2026), nv., es. & biographer
- Tereza Boučková (b. 1957, Czechoslovakia/Czech Republic), fiction wr.
- Laurence Bougault (1970–2018), poet, travel wr.
- Martha Arnold Boughton (1857–1928, United States), wr., poet
- Iana Boukova (b. 1968, Bulgaria), poet, nv. & es.
- Mousse Boulanger (1926–2023, Switzerland), poet
- Carmen Boullosa (b. 1954, Mexico), poet, nv. & pw.
- Jenny Boult (1951–2005, Australia), poet
- Nina Bouraoui (b. 1967, Algeria/France), nv. & songwriter
- Catherine de Bourbon (1559–1604, France), sonneteer & princess
- Louise Bourbonnaud (c. 1847–1915), travel wr. in French
- Charlotte Bourette (1714–1784, France) poet and lemonade seller
- Madeleine Bourdouxhe (1906–1996, Belgium), nv. in French
- Angela Bourke (b. 1952, Ireland), fiction wr. & historian
- Eva Bourke (b. 1946, Germany/Ireland), poet in English
- Marie Marguerite Bouvet (1865–1915, United States), ch. fiction wr.
- Jeanne Bouvier (1865–1964, France), political wr. & feminist
- Sarah Bouyain (b. 1968, France), wr. & film director
- Dounia Bouzar (b. 1964, France), anthropologist & educator
- Marie-Anne de Bovet (1855–1943, France), nv. & travel wr.
- Louise Bovie (1810–1870, Belgium), fiction wr. in French
- Avice Maud Bowbyes (1901–1992, New Zealand), domestic wr.
- Jane Bowdler (1743–1784, England), poet & es.
- Elizabeth Bowen (1899–1973, Ireland/England), fiction & non-f. wr.
- Emily Bowes (1806–1857, England), wr.
- Mary Bowes (1749–1800, England), pw. & botanist
- Sarah Bowie (living, Ireland), ch. wr. & illustrator)
- Jane Bowles (1917–1973, United States), wr. & pw.
- Mary D. R. Boyd (1809–1899, United States), ch. wr.
- Karin Boye (1900–1941, Sweden), poet & nv.
- Clare Boylan (1948–2006, Ireland), fiction wr. & critic
- Helen Boyle (1899–1988, England/Ireland), activist & garden wr.
- Kay Boyle (1902–1992, United States), wr., educator & activist
- Virginia Frazer Boyle (1863–1938, United States), wr. & poet
- Ágota Bozai (b. 1965, Hungary), nv. & translator
- Zuzana Brabcová (1959–2015, Czechoslovakia/Czech Republic), nv.
- Coral Bracho (b. 1951, Mexico), poet & academic
- Luisa Lacal de Bracho (1874–1962, Spain), wr., lexicographer & pianist
- Leigh Brackett (1915–1978, United States), science fiction wr.
- Paula Brackston (living, England), nv.
- Brada (writer) (1847–1938, France), wr., nv.
- Mary Elizabeth Braddon (1837–1915, England), nv.
- Anna Braden (1858–1939, United States), wr. & poet
- Ann Weaver Bradley (1834–1913, United States), ss. wr., poet
- Marion Zimmer Bradley (1930–1999, United States), fantasy & science fiction wr.
- Máire Bradshaw (b. 1943, Ireland), poet
- Anne Bradstreet (1612–1672, United States), poet & wr.
- Eva Brag (1829–1913, Sweden), social wr.
- Anne Bragance (b. 1945, France), wr.
- Sophia Brahe (1559 or 1556–1643, Denmark), horticulturalist & scientist
- Cecilia Manguerra Brainard (b. 1947, Philippines), nv. & editor
- Oyinkan Braithwaite (b. 1988, Nigeria/England), nv.
- Shannon Bramer (b. 1973, Canada/Newfoundland), poet
- Mae Bramhall (c. 1861–1897, United States), actress, writer
- Dolors Bramon (b. 1943, Spain), philologist & academic
- Tatiana Niculescu Bran (living, Romania), nv.
- Dionne Brand (b. 1953, Trinidad/Canada/Newfoundland), poet, nv. & es.
- Hannah Brand (1754–1821, England), actor & pw.
- Mona Brand (1915–2007, Australia), poet, pw. & non-f. wr.
- Beatriz Francisca de Assis Brandão (1779–1868, Brazil), poet & educator
- Fiama Hasse Pais Brandão (1928–2007, Portugal), poet, pw. & es.
- Angelika Brandt (b. 1961), oceanographer
- Johanna Brandt (1876–1964, South Africa), political wr. in Afrikaans
- Adelia Pope Branham (1861–1917, United States), poet, short story wr.
- Alice Dayrell Caldeira Brant (1880–1970, Brazil), diarist
- Giannina Braschi (b. 1953, Paraguay), wr.
- Ann Brashares (b. 1967, United States), YA wr.
- Anne-Sophie Brasme (b. 1984, France), nv.
- Anneke Brassinga (b. 1948, Netherlands), wr. & translator
- Lily Braun (1865–1916, Germany), feminist wr.
- Virginia Braun (living, New Zealand), psychologist
- Anna Eliza Bray (1790–1883, England), nv.
- Libba Bray (b. 1964, United States), YA nv.
- Teresa Brayton (1868–1943, Ireland/United States), poet & col.
- Angela Brazil (1868–1947, England), YA wr.
- Freda Bream (1918–1996, New Zealand), teacher & autobiographer
- Jean "Binta" Breeze (1956–2021, Jamaica), poet & storyteller
- Marie Bregendahl (1867–1940, Denmark), fiction wr.
- Kirstin Breitenfellner (b. 1966, Austria/Austria-Hungary), nv., critic & yoga teacher
- Fredrika Bremer (1801–1865, Sweden), nv. & feminist
- Kristina Brenk (1911–2009, Yugoslavia/Slovenia), ch. wr. & poet
- Maeve Brennan (1917–1993, Ireland/United States), fiction & social wr.
- Sarah Rees Brennan (b. 1983, Ireland/United States), YA nv.
- Anita Brenner (1905–1974, Mexico/United States), cultural wr. in English
- Sophia Elisabet Brenner (1659–1730, Sweden), wr., poet & feminist
- Bridget Brereton (b. 1946, Trinidad & Tobago), non-f., historian
- Jane Brereton (1685–1740, Wales), poet
- Nana Ekua Brew-Hammond (living, United States/Ghana/Gold Coast), fiction wr. & poet
- Martha Wadsworth Brewster (1710 – c. 1757, United States), poet & wr.; first named American-born woman to publish
- Yvonne Brewster (1938–2025, Jamaica), mem. & actor
- Melitta Breznik (b. 1961, As/Switzerland), fiction wr.
- Bub Bridger (1924–2009, New Zealand), poet & fiction wr.
- London Bridgez (b. 1982, United States), poet & wr.
- Elín Briem (1856–1937, Iceland), cookery wr.
- Anna Brigadere (1861–1933, Latvia), pw.
- Patricia Briggs (b. 1965, United States), fantasy wr.
- Mary Chavelita Dunne Bright (1859–1945, Australia/England), wr. & feminist
- Eliza Brightwen (1830–1906, Scotland), wr. & naturalist
- Lourdes Castrillo Brillantes (living, Philippines), wr. in Spanish
- Hesba Brinsmead (1922–2003, Australia), nv.
- Geneviève Brisac (b. 1951, France), nv. & ch. wr.
- Vera Brittain (1893–1970, England), wr., feminist & pacifist
- Victoria Brittain (b. 1942, England), journalist & author
- Sarah Britten (b. 1974, South Africa), social and YA wr. in English
- Rosa María Britton (1936–2019, Panama), fiction wr. & physician
- Dragana Kršenković Brković (living, Montenegro), wr.
- Ivana Brlić-Mažuranić (1874–1938, Austria/Austria-Hungary/Yugoslavia), ch. wr.
- Adele Broadbent (b. 1968, New Zealand), ch. wr.
- Chris Broadribb (living, Australia), fiction wr.
- Renée Brock (1912–1980, Belgium), poet & fiction wr. in French
- Lina Brockdorff (1930–2026, Malta), nv. & pw.
- Sybil le Brocquy (1892–1973, Ireland), pw. & patron
- Molly Brodak (1980–2020, United States), poet
- Anne Brodbelt (1751–1827, United Kingdom/Jamaica), non-f. wr. & social observer
- Erna Brodber (b. 1940, Jamaica), nv. & sociologist
- Eve Brodlique (1867–1949, England/Canada/United States), wr. & journalist
- Patricia Burke Brogan (1926–2022), Ireland), pw. & poet
- Suzanne Brøgger (b. 1944, Denmark), nv. & poet
- Vera Broido (1907–2004, Soviet Union/England), social wr.
- Constance Bromley (1882–1939, England), wr., magazine editor, film publicist
- Alina Bronsky (b. 1978, Germany), nv. & ch. wr.
- Anne Brontë (1820–1849, England), nv. & poet; The Tenant of Wildfell Hall
- Charlotte Brontë (1816–1855, England), nv. & poet; Jane Eyre
- Emily Brontë (1818–1848, England), nv. & poet; Wuthering Heights
- Charlotte Brooke (c. 1740–1793, Ireland), translator from Irish
- Emma Brooke (1844–1926, England), nv.
- Frances Brooke (1723–1789, England), nv., es. & pw.
- Iris Brooke (1905–1981, England), non-f. wr. & illustrator
- Susan Brookes (b. 1943), England), non-f.
- Anita Brookner (1928–2016, England), nv. & art historian
- Geraldine Brooks (b. 1955, Australia/United States), nv.
- Gwendolyn Brooks (1917–2000, United States), poet & wr.
- Anne Brooksbank (b. 1943, Australia), scriptwriter & pw.
- Mary Anne Broome, Lady Broome (1831–1911, Australia), nv., travel & ch. wr.
- Nicole Brossard (b. 1943, Canada/Newfoundland), poet & nv.
- Alice Williams Brotherton (1848–1930, United States), poet & wr.
- Rhoda Broughton (1840–1920, Wales/England), nv.
- Olga Broumas (b. 1949, Greece/United States), poet in English
- Flora Brovina (b. 1949, Kosovo), poet & pediatrician
- Irja Agnes Browallius (1901–1968, Finland/Sweden), fiction wr.
- Edith Brower (1848–1931, United States), reformer, non-f. wr.
- Annie Greene Brown (1855–1923, United States), nv.
- Babette Brown (1931–2019, South Africa/England), socio-political wr.
- Cindy Lynn Brown (b. 1973, Denmark/United States), poet
- Deidre Brown (b. 1970, New Zealand), art historian
- Diane Brown (b. 1951, New Zealand), nv. & poet
- Eva Maria Brown (1856–1917, United States), reformer, activist & legal wr.
- Helen Brown (b. 1954, New Zealand/Australia), wr. & col.
- Lily Brown (b. 1981, United States), poet & wr.
- Helen Gurley Brown (1922–2012, United States), wr.
- Margaret Wise Brown (1910–1952, United States), ch. wr.
- Monica Brown (b. 1969, Peru/United States), ch. wr.
- Pam Brown (b. 1948, Australia), poet & prose wr.
- Pat Brown (b. 1955, United States), wr. on crime
- Rebecca Brown (b. 1956, United States), wr.
- Rita Mae Brown (b. 1944, United States), nv., poet & screenwriter
- Riwia Brown (b. 1957, New Zealand), pw.
- Audrey Brown-Pereira (b. 1975, New Zealand), poet & civil servant
- Emma Alice Browne (1835–1890, United States), poet
- Frances Browne (1816–1879, Ireland), poet & nv., ch. fiction wr.
- Harriet Louisa Browne (1829–1906, Scotland/New Zealand), salonnière & correspondent
- Mary Bonaventure Browne (post-1610 – post-1670, Ireland), abbess & historian
- Elizabeth Barrett Browning (1806–1861, England), poet; Aurora Leigh
- Josette Bruce (1920–1996, Poland/France), nv.
- Mary Grant Bruce (1878–1958, Australia), ch. wr. & col.
- Edith Bruck (b. 1931, Hungary/Italy), fiction wr. & pw. in Italian
- Mary Brück (1925–2008, Ireland/Scotland), astronomer & science historian
- Christine Brückner (1921–1996, Germany), fiction & ch. wr.
- Máire MacSwiney Brugha (1918–2012, Ireland), poet & fiction wr.
- Alyssa Brugman (b. 1974, Australia), YA wr.
- Til Brugman (1888–1958, Netherlands), fiction wr. & poet
- Eliane Brum (b. 1966, Brazil), current affairs wr.
- Herminia Brumana (1897–1954, Argentina), nv. & pw.
- Therese Brummer (1833–1896), Danish children's writer and biographer
- Friederike Brun (1765–1835, Denmark), wr. & salonnière
- Elisa Brune (1966–2018, Belgium), wr. in French
- Marta Brunet (1897–1967, Chile), fiction wr.
- Andrée Brunin (1937–1993, France), poet
- Giuliana Bruno (living, England), environmentalist
- Marianne Bruns (1897–1994, Georgia (Caucasus)), nv. & poet
- Mary Brunton (1778–1818, Scotland), nv.
- Sara Cone Bryant (1873–1956, United States), lecturer, teacher, wr.
- Colette Bryce (b. 1970, Northern Ireland/England), poet
- Jane Bryce (b. 1951, Tanzania/England), non-f. wr, critic, academic
- Bryher (1894–1983, England), nv., poet & mem.
- Annika Bryn (b. 1945, Sweden), fiction wr.
- Anna Brzezińska (b. 1971, Poland), fiction wr.

=== Bu–By ===
- Bu Feiyan (步非烟, b. 1981, China), wuxia nv.
- Mary K. Buck (1849–1901, Bohemia/United States), wr.
- Pearl S. Buck (1892–1973, United States), fiction wr. & biographer; 1938 Nobel Prize in Literature
- Catherine Buckle (b. 1957, Zimbabwe), ch. wr.
- Ann Buckley (living, Ireland), musicologist
- Klara Buda (living, Albania/France), wr. & col.
- Zsuzsanna Budapest (b. 1940, Hungary/United States), non-f. wr. in English
- Mariam Budia (b. 1970, Sp.), pw. & academic
- Maria Elizabeth Budden (c. 1780–1832, England), nv., translator & ch. wr.
- Lukrecija Bogašinović Budmani (1710–1784, Dalmatia/Ragusa), poet
- Andrea Hollander Budy (b. 1947, United States), poet
- Aminta Buenaño (b. 1958, Ecuador), wr. & politician
- Ken Bugul (b. 1947, Senegal), nv. in Wolof
- Traude Bührmann (b. 1942, Germany), nv. & col.
- Kanstantsia Builo (1893–1986, Soviet Union/Bulgaria), poet & pw.
- Lela E. Buis (living, United States), fiction, non-f. and poetry
- Ada Buisson (1839–1866), nv. and writer of ghost stories
- Fanny Buitrago (living, Comoros), fiction wr. & pw.
- NoViolet Bulawayo (b. 1981, Zimbabwe), fiction wr.
- Emily Hemans Bulcock (1877–1969, Australia), poet
- Fanny Bulkeley-Owen (1845–1927, Wales), historian
- Victoria Adukwei Bulley (living, England), poet
- Margaret Bullock (1845–1903, New Zealand), col. & nv.
- Silvina Bullrich (1915–1990, Argentina), nv. & screenwriter
- Anna Bülow (died 1519, Sweden), wr., translator & abbess
- Selina Bunbury (1802–1882, Ireland), nv. & travel wr.
- Delfina Bunge (1881–1952, Argentina), poet, fiction wr. & es.
- Anna Bunina (1774–1829, Russia), poet
- Sevim Burak (1931–1983, Turkey/Ottoman Empire), fiction wr. & pw.
- Adda Burch (1869–1929, United States), non-f. wr., teacher, missionary & activist
- Elizabeth Burchill (1904–2003, Australia), wr., nurse & philanthropist
- Catherine Dorothea Burdett (1784–1861, Ireland), nv.
- Carmen de Burgos (1867–1932, Spain), wr. & activist
- Erika Burkart (1922–2010, Switzerland), poet & wr. in German
- Anne Burke (fl. 1780–1805, Ireland), fiction wr.
- Jan Burke (b. 1953, United States), nv. & short story wr.
- Bonnie Burnard (1945–2017, Canada/Newfoundland), nv.
- Frances Hodgson Burnett (1849–1924, England), pw. & ch. wr.
- Caroline Burney (fl. early 19th century), nv.
- Frances Burney (1776–1828, England), closet pw.
- Frances Burney (1752–1840, England), nv., diarist & pw.
- Sarah Burney (1772–1844, England), nv.
- Clara Louise Burnham (1854–1827, United States), nv.
- Andreas Burnier (1931–2002, Netherlands), poet & wr.
- Anna Burns (b. 1962, Northern Ireland), nv.
- Joanne Burns (b. 1945, Australia), art critic, historian & nv.
- Deborah Burrows (b. 1959, Australia), nv.
- Mary Towne Burt (1842–1898, United States), temperance reformer
- Stephanie Burt (b. 1971, United States), poet & critic
- Margaret Busby (b. 1944, Ghana/Gold Coast), publisher, critic & pw.
- Penny Busetto (living, South Africa), nv. in English
- Olivia Ward Bush (1869–1944, United States), wr., poet & col.
- Abena Busia (b. 1953, Ghana/Gold Coast), poet & academic
- Akosua Busia (b. 1966, Ghana/Gold Coast), actor, nv. & screenwriter
- Helle Busacca (1915–1996, Italy), poet, wr. & painter
- Christine Busta (1915–1987, Austria/Austria-Hungary), poet & ch. wr.
- Hipatia Cárdenas de Bustamante (1889–1972, Ecuador), wr. & feminist
- María Nieves y Bustamante (1871–1947, Peru), wr.
- Gabriela Bustelo (b. 1962, Spain), nv. & political wr.
- Fatimah Busu (b. 1943, Malaysia), fiction wr. & academic
- Sharon Butala (b. 1940, Canada/Newfoundland), nv.
- Amy Butcher (living, United States), es. & wr.
- Ruby Bute (1943–2024, Aruba), fiction wr., poet & painter
- Dorothy Butler (1925–2015, New Zealand), ch. wr. & mem.
- Gwendoline Butler (also Jennie Melville; 1922–2013, England), nv.
- Octavia Butler (1947–2006, United States), science fiction wr.
- Susan Bulkeley Butler (living, United States), wr.
- Urvashi Butalia (b. 1952, India), writer & activist
- Julia Butschkow (b. 1978, Denmark), fiction wr. & poet
- Miriam Butterworth (1918–2019, United States), pacifist & politician
- Razia Butt (1924–2012, Pakistan), nv. & radio pw.
- Mary Butts (1890–1937, England), modernist wr.
- Rumena Bužarovska (b. 1981, Macedonia), wr.
- A. S. Byatt (1936–2023, England), nv. & poet
- Kim Byeol-ah (b. 1969, Korea), wr.
- Marie Beuzeville Byles (1900–1979, Australia), travel & non-f. wr.
- Maj Bylock (1931–2019, Sweden), ch. wr. & educator
- Sarah Shun-lien Bynum (b. 1972, United States), fiction wr. & anthologist
- Ethna Byrne-Costigan (1904–1991, Ireland), academic & wr.
- Catherine Byron (b. 1947, England/Northern Ireland), poet
- Cheryl Byron (c. 1947–2003, Trinidad), poet & singer

== C ==
=== Ca–Ch ===
- Fernán Caballero (1796–1877, Spain), nv.
- Meg Cabot (b. 1967, United States), wr.
- Astrid Cabral (b. 1936, Brazil), nv. & poet
- Cristina Rodríguez Cabral (b. 1959, Uruguay), poet & researcher
- Lydia Cabrera (1899–1991, Cuba), ethnographer
- Aurora Cáceres (1877–1958, Peru), nv., es. & travel wr.
- Esther de Cáceres (1903–1971, Uruguay), poet
- Lydia Cacho (b. 1963, Mexico), social writer
- Caroline Caddy (b. 1944, Australia), poet
- Florence Caddy (1837–1923, England), wr.
- Elizabeth Cadell (1903–1989, India/England), wr.
- Dilys Cadwaladr (1902–1979, Wales), poet
- Kathleen Caffyn (Iota, 1853–1926, Australia), nv.
- Claude Cahun (1894–1954, France), wr. & photographer
- Cai Yan (蔡琰, late 2nd–early 3rd centuries, China), poet & composer
- Dominique Caillat (living, Switzerland/Germany), social wr.
- Rachel Caine, pen name of Roxanne Longstreet Conrad (1962–2020, United States), nv.
- Mona Caird (c. 1854–1932, Scotland), nv. & es.
- Lutegarda Guimarães de Caires (1873–1935, Portugal), poet & activist
- Susana Calandrelli (1901–1978, Argentina), poet, fiction wr. & es.
- Graciela Rincón Calcaño (1904–1987, Venezuela), wr. & poet
- Moyra Caldecott (1927–2015, South Africa/England), fiction & non-f. Wr.
- Laura Calder (living, Canada), wr.
- Taylor Caldwell (1900–1985, England/United States), nv.
- Hortense Calisher (1911–2009, United States), wr.
- Margaret Callan (c.1817–c.1883), Ireland/Australia), poet
- Maria Callcott (1785–1842, England), ch. & travel wr.
- Nina de Callias (1843–1884, France), poet
- Carmen Callil (1938–2022, Australia/UK), wr. & critic
- June Callwood (1924–2007, Canada/Newfoundland), wr. & activist
- Marie Calm (1832–1887, Germany), poet, nv. and household wr.
- Mena Calthorpe (1905–1996, Australia), nv.
- Paola Calvetti (b. 1948, Italy), nv. & col.
- Carmen Camacho (writer) (b. 1976, Spain), wr., poet & col.
- María Enriqueta Camarillo (1872–1968, Mexico), poet & fiction wr.
- Ada Cambridge (1844–1926, Australia), nv., poet & autobiographer
- Joan Cambridge (living, Guyana), nv. & journalist
- María Cambrils (1878–1939, Spain), feminist wr.
- Charlotte Cameron (c. 1872–1946, United States), travel writer
- Elizabeth Cameron (editor) (1851–1929, Canada), edi.
- Margaret Cameron (1867–1947, United States), nv., pw., & non-f. wr.
- Teresa Cameselle (b. 1968, Spain), nv. & historical narr.
- Duccia Camiciotti (1928–2014, Italy), poet and es.
- Roser Caminals-Heath (living, Spain), nv. in Catalan
- Cordelia Camp (1884–1973, United States), non-f.
- Kate Camp (b. 1972, New Zealand), poet
- Manuela Campanelli (b. 1962, Italy), science wr.
- Bebe Moore Campbell (1950–2006, United States), nv.
- Bonnie Jo Campbell (b. 1962, United States), fiction wr.
- Elizabeth Duncan Campbell (1804–1878, Scotland), poet
- Hazel Campbell (1940–2018, Jamaica), fiction & ch. wr.
- Shirley Campbell (b. 1965, Costa Rica), poet
- Lady Colin Campbell (b. 1949, Jamaica/England), biographer
- Marion May Campbell (b. 1948, Australia), nv. & academic
- Meg Campbell (1937–2007, New Zealand), poet
- Nellie Campobello (1900–1986, Mexico), poet & chronicler
- Ana Barrios Camponovo (b. 1961, Uruguay/Spain), wr. & illustrator
- Julieta Campos (1932–2007, Cuba/Mexico), nv.
- María Teresa Campos (b. 1941, Spain), non-f. wr.
- Zenobia Camprubí (1887–1956, Spain/United States), wr & poet
- Matilde Camus (1919–2012, Spain), poet & non-f. wr.
- Lorea Canales (living, Mexico), nv. & lawyer
- Amélie-Julie Candeille (1667–1734, France), librettist & composer
- Eva Canel (1857–1932, Spain/Cuba), nv. & satirist
- Marta Canessa (b. 1936, Uruguay), historian & academic
- Yanitzia Canetti (b. 1967, Cuba/United States), nv., es. & ch. wr.
- Emma Mieko Candon, American novelist
- Dorothy Canfield (1879–1958, United States), wr.; Understood Betsy
- May Wedderburn Cannan (1893–1973, England), poet
- Moya Cannon (b. 1956, Ireland), poet
- Minna Canth (1844–1897, Finland), wr. & activist
- Estela Canto (1919–1994, Argentina), nv., biographer & translator
- Ludmilla Lacueva Canut (b. 1971, Andorra), fiction & non-f. wr.
- Lan Cao (b. 1961, Vietnam/United States), wr.
- Úna-Minh Caomhánach (b. 1991, Ireland), travel & social wr.
- Vahni Capildeo (b. 1973, Trinidad/Scotland), poet
- Maria Aurèlia Capmany (1918–1991, Spain), nv. & pw.
- Jeanne Cappe (1895–1956, Belgium), YA wr. in French
- Margarita Abella Caprile (1901–1960, Argentina), poet & fiction & travel wr.
- Paola Capriolo (b. 1962, Italy), nv.
- Marcelle Capy (1891–1962, France), nv. & feminist
- Ethna Carbery (1864–1902, Ireland), wr. & poet
- Teresa Gisbert Carbonell (1926–2018, Bolivia), art historian
- Mercedes Cabello de Carbonera (1845–1909, Peru), nv. & es.
- Hazel V. Carby (b. 1946, England/United States), academic & non-f. wr.
- Lara Cardella (b. 1969, Italy), nv.
- Nancy Cárdenas (1934–1994, Mexico), poet & pw.
- Amélia dos Santos Costa Cardia (1855–1938, Portugal), nv. & physician
- Marie Cardinal (1929–2001, Algeria/France), nv.
- Dulce Maria Cardoso (b. 1964, Portugal), fiction wr.
- Bernadette Carey Smith (1939–2022, United States), journalist
- Jacqueline Carey (b. 1964, United States), nv.
- Rosa Nouchette Carey (1840–1909, England), nv. & ch. wr.
- Mary Jane Goodson Carlisle (1835–1905, United States), cookbook wr.
- Patricia Carlon (1927–2002), nv.
- Gunnel Carlson (b. 1956, Sweden), gardening wr.
- Kristina Carlson (b. 1949, Finland), fiction & YA wr. & poet
- Carrie Carlton (1834–1868, United States}, poet, ch. wr., non-f. wr.
- Gladys Carmagnola (1939–2015, Paraguay), poet & ch. wr.
- Amy Carmichael (1867–1951, Ireland/India), wr. & missionary
- Jennings Carmichael (1868–1904, Australia), poet
- María Luisa Carnelli (1898–1987, Argentina), poet & col.
- Ethel Carnie Holdsworth (1886–1962, England), wr. & socialist campaigner
- Pauline Cassin Caro (1828/34/35 – 1901, France), nv.
- Jeanne C. Smith Carr (1825–1903, United States), non-f. wr.
- Marina Carr (b. 1964, Ireland), pw.
- Peggy Carr (b. c. 1955, Saint Vincent/Taiwan), poet & nv.
- Maite Carranza (b. 1958, Spain), nv. & ch. wr.
- Margarita Carrera (1929–2018, Guatemala), philosopher, poet and es.
- Albertina Carri (b. 1973, Argentina), screenwriter & director
- Leonora Carrington (1917–2011, England/Mexico), nv., artist & surrealist
- Austin Carroll (1835–1909, Ireland/United States), religious wr. & nun
- Claudia Carroll (b. c. 1969, Ireland), fiction wr. & actor
- Anne Carson (b. 1950, Canada/Newfoundland), poet, ess., translator & academic
- Rachel Carson (1907–1964, United States), marine biologist & conservationist
- Esther Carstensen (1873–1955, Denmark), rights activist
- Catherine Carswell (1879–1946, Scotland), wr.
- Teresa de Cartagena (c. 1425–?, Spain), religious wr.
- Aída Cartagena Portalatín (1918–1994), Dominican poet, fiction wr. & ess.
- Angela Carter (1940–1992, England), nv. & col.
- Anne Laurel Carter (b. 1953, Canada/Newfoundland), nv.
- Elizabeth Carter (1717–1806, England), poet, wr. & Bluestocking
- Emma de Cartosio (1928–2013, Argentina), wr. & poet
- Candice Carty-Williams (b. 1989, England), nv. & col.
- Maria Amália Vaz de Carvalho (1847–1921, Portugal), biographer, fiction wr. & poet
- Maria Judite de Carvalho (1921–1998, Portugal), fiction wr. & poet
- Caroline Carver (b. 1959, England/Australia), nv.
- Lisa Crystal Carver (b. 1968, United States), wr.
- Alice Cary (1820–1871, United States), poet
- Elizabeth Cary (1585–1639, England), pw.
- Phoebe Cary (1824–1871, United States), poet
- Selva Casal (1930–2020, Uruguay), poet
- Fina Casalderrey (b. 1951, Spain), ch. wr. & gastronomer in Galician
- María Andrea Casamayor (1720–1780, Spain), wr. & mathematician
- Sofía Casanova (1861–1958, Spain), poet & nv.
- Borita Casas (1911–1999, Spain), pw. & ch. wr.
- Matilde Casazola (b. 1942, Bolivia), poet & songwriter
- Nené Cascallar (1914–1982, Argentina), broadcast pw. & screenwriter
- Marietta Stanley Case (1845–1900, United States), poet
- Maxine Case (b. 1976, South Africa), fiction wr. in English
- Adelaide Casely-Hayford (1868–1960, Sierra Leone), fiction wr. & educator
- Gladys May Casely-Hayford (1901–1950, Sierra Leone), poet
- Anne-Marie Casey (b. 1965, Ireland), screenwriter & nv.
- Kathryn Casey (living, United States), true crime wr. & nv.
- Maie Casey, Baroness Casey (1910–1983, Australia), poet, librettist & biographer
- Deirdre Cash (1924–1963, Australia), nv.
- Kristin Cashore (b. 1976, United States), fantasy wr.
- Linda Ty Casper (b. 1931, Philippines), nv.
- Nina Cassian (1924–2014, Romania/United States), poet, ch. wr. & critic
- P. C. Cast (b. 1960, United States), wr.
- Cecilia Castaño (b. 1953, Spain), political scientist
- Yolanda Castaño (b. 1977, Spain), poet, critic & painter
- Sofía Castañón (b. 1983, Spain), poet
- Adela Castell (1864–1926, Uruguay), es. & poet
- Rosario Castellanos (1925–1974, Mexico), poet & wr.
- Blanca Castellón (b. 1958, Nicaragua), poet
- Castelloza (fl. early 13th century, France), troubadour poet
- Josefina Castellví (b. 1935, Spain), oceanographer & biologist
- Almucs de Castelnau (c. 1140 – pre–1184, France), poet in Occitan
- Gladys Castelvecchi (1922–2008, Uruguay), poet & academic
- Ana Castillo (b. 1953, Mx/United States), fiction wr., poet & es.
- Claire Castillon (b. 1975, France), fiction & ch. wr.
- Agnes Castle (c. 1860–1922, Ireland), fiction wr.
- Elisabeth Castonier (1894–1975, Germany), ch. wr. in German & English
- Inga-Brita Castrén (1919–2003, Finland), theologian
- Luisa Castro (b. 1966, Spain), poet & fiction wr.
- Públia Hortênsia de Castro (1548–1595, Portugal), scholar & nun
- Rosalía de Castro (1837–1885, Spain), wr. & poet in Galician
- Willa Cather (1873–1947, United States), wr.
- Catherine of Siena (1347–1380, Italy), religious writer & saint
- Christine Cole Catley (1922–2011, New Zealand), col. & biographer
- Nancy Cato (1917–2000, Australia), nv., poet & biographer
- Eleanor Catton (b. 1985, Canada/Newfoundland/New Zealand), nv.
- Joyce Cavalccante (living, Brazil), fiction wr.
- Nadia Cavalera (b. 1950, Italy), nv., poet & critic
- Jeanne de Cavally (1926–1992, Ivory Coast), ch. wr.
- Jane Cavendish (1620/1621–1669, England), poet & pw.
- Margaret Cavendish (1623–1673, England), poet, pw. & fiction wr.
- Hannah Rebecca Frances Caverhill (1834–1897, England/New Zealand), diarist & homemaker
- Agathe-Pauline Caylac de Caylan (1782–1847, France), nv,. fiction wr.
- Rosina Cazali (b. 1960, Guatemala), art critic
- Anne-Marie Cazalis (1920–1988, France), poet & col.
- Otilia Cazimir (1894–1967, Romania), poet & prose wr.
- Mercedes Cebrián (b. 1971, Spain), fiction wr. & poet
- Martha Cecilia (b. 1953, Philippines), nv.
- Siv Cedering (1939–2007, Sweden/United States), poet & fiction wr. in Swedish & English
- Peride Celal (1916–2013, Turkey/Ottoman Empire), fiction wr.
- Susannah Centlivre (1667–1723, England), pw. & poet
- Natividad Cepeda (living, Spain), poet & col.
- Laura Cereta (1469–1499, Italy), humanist
- Anica Černej (1900–1944, Austria/Austria-Hungary/Yugoslavia), wr., poet & concentration camp victim
- Laura Sintija Černiauskaitė (b. 1976, Lithuania), pw. & nv.
- Annabel Cervantes (b. 1969, Spain), geographer in Catalan
- Marie Červinková-Riegrová (1854–1895, Austria/Austria-Hungary), librettist
- Isabella Cervoni (1575–1600, Italy), poet
- Ruxandra Cesereanu (b. 1963, Romania), poet, fiction wr. & critic
- Alba de Céspedes (1911–1997, Cuba/Italy), nv.
- Úrsula Céspedes (1832–1874, Cuba), wr. & educator
- Ana Cristina Cesar (1952–1983, Brazil), poet & critic
- Fethiye Çetin (b. 1950, Turkey/Ottoman Empire), political biographer
- Violante do Céu (fl. 17th century, Portugal), poet
- Margaret Cezair-Thompson (living, Jamaica), fiction wr. & screenwriter
- Theresa Hak Kyung Cha (1951–1982, United States), nv. & artist
- Dulce Chacón (1954–2003, Spain), poet, nv. & pw.
- Zofia Chądzyńska (1912–2003, Poland), nv.
- Nadia Chafik (b. 1962, Morocco), fiction wr. in French
- Arlene J. Chai (b. 1955, Philippines/Australia), nv.
- Annie Emma Challice (1821–1875, England), wr. & non-f. wr.
- Brenda Chamberlain (1912–1971, Wales), poet, nv. & artist
- Anne Chambers (living, Ireland), biographer, nv. & screenwriter
- Kátya Chamma (b. 1961, Brazil), poet & wr.
- Tracy Chamoun (b. 1960, Lebanon), political wr. & diplomat
- Élise Champagne (1897–1983, Belgium), educator & wr. in French
- Ernestina de Champourcín (1905–1999, Spain), poet
- Françoise Chandernagor (b. 1945, France), nv. & pw.
- Elizabeth Margaret Chandler (1807–1834, United States), poet & wr.
- Lynda Chanwai-Earle (living, Papua New Guinea/New Zealand), pw., poet & scriptwriter
- Hester Chapone (1827–1901, England), wr. of conduct books
- Corinne Chaponnière (b. 1954, Switzerland/Canada/Newfoundland), social wr. & biographer in French
- Isabelle de Charrière (1740–1805, Netherlands/France), fiction wr. & correspondent in French
- Raquel Chaves (b. 1939, Paraguay), poet & nv.
- Daína Chaviano (b. 1957, Cuba/United States), science fiction wr.
- Neelam Saxena Chandra (b. 1969, India), poet & ch. wr.
- Chandramathi (b. 1954, India), fiction wr. & critic
- Chang Ch'ung-ho (張充和, 1914–2015, China/United States), poet & singer
- Diana Chang (1934–2009, China/United States), nv. & poet
- Eileen Chang (张爱玲, 1920–1995, China/United States), es., nv. & screenwriter
- Jung Chang (b. 1952, China/United States), wr.; Wild Swans
- Zeenat Abdullah Channa (1919–1974, India/Pakistan), wr. & educationist
- Lynda Chanwai-Earle (living, Papua New Guinea/New Zealand), pw., poet & scriptwriter
- Rose Woodallen Chapman (1875–1923, United States), non-f. wr. & ed.
- Hester Chapone (1727–1801, England), wr. & Bluestocking
- Madeleine Chapsal (1925–2024, France), nv., es. & ch. wr.
- Charlotte Charke (1713–1760, England), pw., nv. & autobiographer
- Edmonde Charles-Roux (1920–2016, France), nv. & col.
- Elizabeth Charlotte, Princess Palatine (1652–1722, Germany), correspondent
- Maureen Charlton (1930–2007, Ireland), pw. & poet
- Janet Charman (b. 1954, New Zealand), poet
- Isabelle de Charrière (1740–1805, Netherlands), nv. in French
- Lidia Charskaya (1875–1938, Russia), nv.
- Victorine Chastenay (1771–1855), wr. & mem.
- Noëlle Châtelet (b. 1944, France), es. & fiction wr.
- Rimi B. Chatterjee (b. 1969, India), nv. & historian
- Georgiana Chatterton (1806–1876, England), wr. & traveler
- Beth Chatto (1923–2018, England), garden wr.
- Jayasri Chattopadhyay (b. 1945, India), poet & academic
- Anuja Chauhan (b. 1970, India), nv. & screenwriter
- Subhadra Kumari Chauhan (1904–1948, India), poet & Hindi songwriter
- Nan Chauncy (1900–1970, Australia), ch. wr.
- Susana Chávez (1974–2011, Mexico), poet & activist
- Daína Chaviano (b. 1960, Curaçao), wr.
- Chantal Chawaf (b. 1943, France), social wr.
- Dniprova Chayka (1861–1927, Russia/Ukraine), poet & fiction wr.
- Charlotte Saumaise de Chazan (1619–1684, France), poet
- Mavis Cheek (b. c. 1948, England), nv.
- Isabel Cheix (1839–1899, Spain), nv., poet & pw.
- Olena Chekan (1946–2013, Ukraine), screenwriter & actor
- Saveria Chemotti (b. 1947, Italy), non-f., es. & nv.
- Chen Danyan (陈丹燕, b. 1958, China), biographer
- Chen Jingrong (陳敬容, 1917–1989, China), poet
- Chen Xuezhao (陈学昭, 1906–1991, China), es. & col.
- Ying Chen (应晨, b. 1961, China/Canada/Newfoundland), wr.
- Aïcha Chenna (1941–2022, Morocco), social wr. & activist
- Cheon Un-yeong (천운영, b. 1971, Korea), fiction wr.
- Svetlana Chervonnaya (b. 1948, Soviet Union/Russia), political historian
- Élisabeth Sophie Chéron (1648–1711, France), poet, painter & musician
- Kelly Cherry (1940–2022, United States), nv., poet & es.
- C. J. Cherryh (b. 1942, United States), science fiction & fantasy wr.
- Anna Maria Chetwode (fl. 1827, Ireland), nv.
- Angelica Cheung (张宇, China), fashion wr. & editor
- Tracy Chevalier (b. 1962, United States/England), nv.; Girl with a Pearl Earring
- Corinne Chevallier (b. 1935, Algeria), nv. & historian
- Elizabeth Washington Foote Cheves (fl. 1840s; United States), wr. & poet
- Helmina von Chézy (1783–1856, Germany), poet, pw. and col.
- Catherine Chidgey (b. 1970, New Zealand), fiction wr.
- Panashe Chigumadzi (b. 1991, Zimbabwe), col., es. & nv.
- Sagawa Chika (左川ちか,1911–1936, Japan), poet
- Lydia Maria Child (1802–1880, United States), poet & nv.
- Alice Childress (1916–1994, United States), pw. & nv.
- Emelie C. S. Chilton (1838–1864, United States). ss. wr. & poet
- Cecile Cilliers (1933–2018, South Africa), es. in Afrikaans
- Irma Chilton (1930–1990, Wales), ch. wr.
- Mei Chin (b. 1977, United States), wr. & food critic
- Luz Argentina Chiriboga (b. 1940, Ecuador), fiction wr.
- Toriko Chiya (稚野鳥子, living, Japan), manga creator
- Fukuda Chiyo-ni (福田千代尼, 1703–1775, Japan), haiku poet
- Paulina Chiziane (b. 1955, Mozambique), fiction wr.
- Youmna Chlala (living, Lebanon/United States), political wr. & artist
- Joanna Chmielewska (1932–2013, Poland), nv. & screenwriter
- Zen Cho (b. 1986, Malaysia/England), fiction wr.
- Sonia Chocrón (b. 1961, Venezuela), poet, nv. & pw.
- Kunzang Choden (b. 1952, Bhutan), nv.
- Pema Chödrön (b. 1936, United States), Buddhist wr.
- Choe Yun (최윤, b. 1953, Korea), fiction wr.
- Choi Jeong-rye (최정례, 1955–2021, Korea), poet
- Susan Choi (b. 1969, United States), nv. & editor
- Maryse Choisy (1903–1979, France), philosophical wr. & nv.
- Mary Cholmondeley (1859–1925, England), nv.
- Lathóg of Tír Chonaill (fl. 9th century, Ireland), poet
- Denise Chong (b. 1953, Canada/Newfoundland), mem. & non-f. wr.
- Choo Waihong (d. 2023, Singapore), travel wr.
- Kate Chopin (1851–1904, United States), fiction wr.
- Lynda Chouiten (living, Algeria), non-f. wr.
- Prem Chowdhry (b. 1944, India), social scientist
- Rita Chowdhury (b. 1960, India), poet & nv.
- Helene Christaller (1872–1953, Germany), ch. nv.
- Linda Christanty (b. 1970, Indonesia), fiction wr. & es.
- Ada Christen (1839–1901, Austria/Austria-Hungary), poet & fiction wr.
- Inger Christensen (1935–2009, Denmark), poet & prose wr.
- Kate Christensen (b. 1962, United States), nv.
- Autumn Christian (living, United States), horror & science fiction wr.
- Yvette Christiansë (b. 1954, South Africa/United States), poet & nv. in English
- Agatha Christie (1890–1976, England), crime wr. & pw.; The Mousetrap
- Elizabeth Christitch (1861–1933, Ireland/Serbia), wr., poet & translator
- Nanae Chrono (黒乃奈々絵, b. 1980, Japan), manga creator
- Chrystos (b. 1946, United States), Menominee rights activist & poet
- Daria Chubata (b. 1940, Ukraine), physician, wr., poet
- R. Chudamani (1931–2010, India), fiction wr.
- Elena Chudinova (b. 1959, Soviet Union/Russia), nv. & non-f. wr.
- Lady Mary Chudleigh (1656–1710, England), poet, es. & wr.
- Leila Chudori (b. 1962, Indonesia), fiction & ch. wr. & screenwriter
- Rain Chudori (b. 1994, Indonesia), fiction wr. & screenwriter
- Ismat Chughtai (1915–1991, India), wr.
- Lydia Chukovskaya (1907–1996, Soviet Union), political wr. & poet
- Eugenia Chuprina (b. 1971, Ukraine), poet, wr., nv., & pw.
- Caryl Churchill (b. 1938, England), pw.
- Sarah Churchwell (b. 1977, United States), academic
- Sylwia Chutnik (b. 1979, Poland), nv. & activist

=== Ci–Co ===
- Fausta Cialente (1898–1994, Italy), nv. & activist
- Maria Luisa Cicci (1760–1794, Italy), woman of letters & poet
- Muazzez İlmiye Çığ (1914–2024, Turkey/Ottoman Empire), archaeologist
- Birutė Ciplijauskaitė (1929–2017, Lithuania/United States), linguist & critic
- Zehra Çırak (b. 1960, Turkey/Ottoman Empire/Germany), fiction wr. in German
- Victoria Cirlot (b. 1955, Spain), medievalist
- Sandra Cisneros (b. 1954, United States), fiction wr.
- Aïssatou Cissé (b. 1970/1971, Senegal), nv.
- Lana Citron (b. 1969, Ireland/England), fiction wr, screenwriter & poet
- Nuriye Ulviye Mevlan Civelek (1893–1964, Turkey/Ottoman Empire), political wr.
- Gabrielle Civil (living, United States), performance artist, poet, & educator
- Hélène Cixous (b. 1937 Algeria/France), poet, pw. & philosopher
- Ellen Clacy (1830–1901, Australia), nv. & non-f. wr.
- Nadezhda Bravo Cladera (living, Bolivia/Sweden), linguist & researcher
- Daphne Clair (b. 1939, New Zealand), nv. & poet
- Paula Clamp (b. 1967, England), nv. & pw.
- Amy Clampitt (1920–1994, United States), poet & wr.
- Myriam J. A. Chancy (b. 1970, Haiti/Canada), nv. & academic
- Fanny Clar (1875–1944, France), journalist & wr.
- Cassandra Clare (b. 1973, United States), young-adult fiction wr.
- Monica Clare (1924–1973, Australia), nv.
- Clarinda (fl. early 17th century, Peru), poet
- Felicia Buttz Clark (1862-1931, United States), nv., non-f. wr.
- Harriet E. Clark (1850–1945, US), teacher & wr.
- Mavis Thorpe Clark (1909–1999, Australia), non-f. & ch. wr.
- Sue Cassidy Clark (living, United States), music col. & photographer
- Joan Clark (1934–2023, Canada/Newfoundland), nv.
- Margaret Clark (b. 1964, United States), historian, wr. & educator
- Mary Higgins Clark (1927–2020), United States), nv.
- Amy Key Clarke (1892–1980, England), mystical poet, wr. & teacher
- Anna Clarke (1919–2004, England), mystery wr.
- Jennie Thornley Clarke (1860–1924, United States), educator, wr., & anthologist
- Josephine Fitzgerald Clarke (1865–1953, Ireland), nv.
- Maxine Beneba Clarke (living, Australia), wr.
- Breena Clarke (living, United States), scholar & wr. of fiction
- Cheryl Clarke (b. 1947, United States), poet, es. & activist
- Coralie Clarke (Coralie Clarke Rees, 1908–1972, Australia), travel wr.
- Gillian Clarke (b. 1937, Wales), poet, pw. & broadcaster
- Mrs. Henry Clarke (1853–1908, England), fiction & ch. wr.
- Mary H. Gray Clarke (1835–1992, United States), wr., correspondent & poet
- Maude Clarke (1892–1935, Northern Ireland/England), historian
- Susanna Clarke (b. 1959, England), nv.
- Patricia Clapp (1912–2003, United States), ch. wr.
- Margareta Clausdotter (died 1486, Sweden), wr. & abbess
- Ana Clavel (b. 1961, Mexico), fiction wr.
- Beverly Cleary (1916–2021, United States), ch. wr.
- Kate McPhelim Cleary (1863–1905, United States), fiction wr.
- Joceline Clemencia (1952–2011, Curaçao), wr. & linguist
- Catherine Clément (b. 1939, France), philosopher, nv. & critic
- Inga Clendinnen (1934–2016, Australia), wr. & historian
- Cleobulina (fl. c. 550 BC, Ancient Greece), poet
- Agnes Mary Clerke (1942–2007, Ireland), astronomer
- Claude Catherine de Clermont (1543–1603, France), scholar & courtier
- Michelle Cliff (1946–2016, Jamaica/United States), fiction wr., poet & critic
- Charmian Clift (1923–1969, Australia), nv. & non-f. wr.
- Lucille Clifton (1936–2010, United States), poet, wr. & educator
- Gloria Griffen Cline (1929–1973, United States), historian
- Michelle T. Clinton (b. 1955, United States), poet.
- Caroline Clive (1801–1872, England), poet & nv.
- Kitty Clive (1711–1785, England), actor & pw.
- Bente Clod (b. 1946, Denmark), poet & prose wr.
- Amal Clooney (b. 1978, Lebanon/England), legal & political wr.
- Marie Closset (Jean Dominique, 1873–1952, Belgium), poet in French
- Carol J. Clover (b. 1940, United States), non-f. wr. and film theorist
- Anne Cluysenaar (1936–2014, Belgium/Ireland), poet & wr. in English
- Hafina Clwyd (1936–2011, Wales), es. & educator
- Constance Clyde (1872–1951, New Zealand/Australia), nv. & political wr.
- Ella Maria Dietz Clymer (1847–1920, United States), poet & actor
- Nellie Euphemia Coad (1883–1974, New Zealand/England), textbook wr.
- Lynn Coady (b. 1970, Canada/Newfoundland), fiction wr. & col.
- Wendy Coakley-Thompson (b. 1966, United States), nv.
- Florence Earle Coates (1850–1927, United States), poet
- Carola Cobo (1909–2003, Bolivia), cookery wr.
- Eliza Dorothea Cobbe, Lady Tuite (c. 1764–1850, Ireland/England), poet
- Frances Power Cobbe (1822–1904, Ireland), wr. & suffragist
- Ellen Melicent Cobden (1848–1914, England), poet, wr., and suffragist
- Sofia Cocea (1839–1861, Romania), es. & poet
- Sarah Johnson Cocke (1865–1944, United States), wr. & mem.
- Patricia Cockburn (1914–1989, Ireland/England), writer & conchologist
- Grace Coddington (b. 1941, Wales), fashion wr. & mem.
- Mariana Codruț (b. 1956, Romania), poet, es. & fiction wr.
- Alice Rollit Coe (1858–1940, Canada/Newfoundland/United States), wr.
- Mariana Coelho (1857–1954, Portugal/Brazil), poet & es.
- Sara Pinto Coelho (1913–1990, Portugal), radio pw. & fiction & ch. wr.
- Ana Cofiño (b. 1955, Guatemala), anthropologist & historian
- Lenore Coffee (1896–1973, United States), nv., pw., and screenwriter
- Yolande Cohen (b. 1950, Morocco/Canada), historian & professor
- Gabrielle de Coignard (1550–1586, France), religious poet
- Virginia Coigney (1917–1997, United States), civic leader & wr.
- Allison Hedge Coke (b. 1958, United States), poet & wr.
- Marina Colasanti (1937–2025, Eritrea/Brazil), wr. & poet
- Frona Eunice Wait Colburn (1859–1946, United States), col. & fiction wr.
- H. Maria George Colby (1844–1910, United States), col. & suffragist
- Emma Shaw Colcleugh (1846–1940, United States), col., lecturer & traveler
- Joanna Cole (1944–2020, United States), ch. wr.
- Lois Dwight Cole (1903–1979, United States), editor & ch. wr.
- Norma Cole (b. 1945, United States), poet, artist & translator
- Alice Blanchard Coleman (1858–1936, United States), nf. wr.
- Wanda Coleman (1946–2013, United States), poet
- Elizabeth Fairburn Colenso (1821–1904, New Zealand), Bible translator & missionary
- Christabel Rose Coleridge (1843–1921, England), nv. & editor
- Mary Elizabeth Coleridge (1861–1907, England), nv. & poet
- Sara Coleridge (1802–1852, England), wr. & translator
- Louise Colet (1910–1976, France), poet & wr.
- Colette (1873–1954, France), nv.; Gigi
- Isabel Colegate (1931–2023, England), nv.
- Marcia Collazo (b. 1959, Uruguay), poet & fiction wr.
- Lindsey Collen (b. 1948, South Africa/Mauritius), wr. in English & Creole
- Camilla Collett (1813–1895, Norway), nv., critic & es.
- Anne-Hyacinthe de Colleville (1761–1824, France), nv. & pw.
- Ada Langworthy Collier (1843–1919, United States), poet & wr.
- Catrin Collier (b. 1948, England), nv. & pw.
- Jennie Collins (1828–1887, United States), activist & wr.
- Daphné Collignon (b. 1977, France), comic book wr.
- Mabel Collins (1851–1927, England), theosophist
- Merle Collins (b. 1950, Grenada), poet & fiction wr.
- Suzanne Collins (b. 1962, United States), nv.
- Danielle Collobert (1940–1978, France), fiction wr. & poet
- Joséphine Colomb (1833–1892, France), children's wr., lyricist & translator
- Vittoria Colonna (1490–1547, Italy), poet
- Katharine Colquhoun ((1787–1871, England), nv.
- Mary Colum (1884–1957, Ireland/United States), critic & wr.
- Mercedes Comaposada (1901–1994, Spain), non-f. wr.
- Sigrid Combüchen (b. 1942, Sweden), nv. & critic
- Cristina Comencini (b. 1956, Italy), screenwriter & nv.
- Anna Manning Comfort (1845–1931, United States), fiction and non-f. wr.
- Flavia Company (b. 1963, Argentina), nv. & poet
- Mercè Company (b. 1947, Spain), ch. wr. in Catalan
- Anne Compton (b. 1947, Canada/Newfoundland), poet, critic & anthologist
- Jennifer Compton (b. 1949, New Zealand/Australia), poet & pw.
- Ivy Compton-Burnett (1884–1969, England), nv.
- Helen Field Comstock (1840–1930, United States), poet, philanthropist
- Helena Concannon (1878–1952, Ireland), historian & politician
- Francisca Josefa de la Concepción (1661–1742, Comoros), nun & mystic
- Nieves Concostrina (b. 1961, Spain), history wr.
- Carmen Conde (1907–1996, Spain), poet & nv.
- Maryse Condé (1937–2024), Guadeloupe/France), nv.
- Rosina Conde (b. 1954, Mexico), narrator, pw. & poet
- Teresa del Conde (1935–2017, Mexico), critic & art historian
- Helen Gray Cone (1859–1934, United States), poet & professor
- Sandra Coney (b. 1944, New Zealand), historian & health campaigner
- Jane Elizabeth Dexter Conklin (1831–1914, United States), poet & religious wr.
- Evelyn Conlon (b. 1952, Ireland), fiction wr. & es.
- Marita Conlon-McKenna (b. 1956, Ireland), fiction and ch. wr.
- Eliza Archard Conner (1838–1912, United States), lecturer & feminist
- Elizabeth Marney Conner (1856–1941, United States), pw., educator & wr.
- Susan E. Connolly (b. c. 1980, Ireland), fiction & non-f. wr.
- June Considine (living, Ireland), ch. wr.
- Lena Constante (1909–2005, Romania), es., mem. & artist
- Josefina Constantino (1920–2024, Philippines/Australia), es., critic & poet
- Ana Conta-Kernbach (1865–1921, Romania), wr. & educator
- Dorothea Conyers (1869–1949, Ireland), nv.
- Diane Cook (living, United States), fiction wr.
- Eliza Cook (1818–1889, England), poet
- Katherine M. Cook (1876–1962, United States), non-f. wr.
- Selma Cook (b. 1961, England), editor
- Kay McKenzie Cooke (b. 1953, New Zealand), poet
- Marvel Cooke (1903–2000, United States), col. & wr.
- Rachel Cooke (1969–2025, England), journalist & wr.
- Elizabeth Cook-Lynn (1930–2023, United States), Sioux poet, nv. & academic
- Ina Coolbrith (b. Josephine Anna Smith, 1841–1928, United States), poet
- Deborah Coonts (living, United States), nv. & lawyer
- Carolyn Cooper (b. 1950, Jamaica), wr. & critic
- J. California Cooper (1931–2014, United States), pw. & fiction wr.
- Jilly Cooper (1937–2025, England), nv. & non-f. wr.
- Wendy Cope (b. 1945, England), poet
- Esther Copley (1786–1851, England), religious & ch. wr.
- Marguerite Coppin (1867–1931, Belgium), poet & nv. in French
- Cora Coralina (1889–1985, Brazil), wr. & poet
- Judy Corbalis (living, New Zealand/England), fiction wr.
- Helena Corbellini (b. 1959, Uruguay), fiction wr. & poet
- Gilda Cordero-Fernando (1932–2020, Philippines), fiction & food wr.
- Alexandra Cordes (1935–1986, Germany), nv.
- Leonor López de Córdoba (1362/1363–1430, Spain), mem.
- Marie Corelli (1855–1924, England), nv.
- Corinna (Κόριννα, 6th century BC, Ancient Greece), poet
- Cornificia (c. 85–c. 40 BC, Ancient Rome), poet & epigram wr.
- Caroline Cornwallis (1786–1858, England), wr. on education, philosophy & science
- Jane Cornwallis (1581–1659, England), correspondent
- Anita Cornwell (1923–2023, United States), wr.
- Patricia Cornwell (b. 1956, United States), crime wr.
- Carolina Coronado (1820–1911, Spain), poet, nv. & pw.
- Domitila García de Coronado (1847–1938, Cuba), biographer & anthologist
- Dolores Correa Zapata (1853–1924, Mexico), non-f. wr., poet
- Celia Correas de Zapata (1933–2022, Argentina), poet & academic
- Hélia Correia (b. 1949, Portugal), nv., pw. & poet
- Natália Correia (1923–1993, Portugal), poet & activist
- Cecilia K Corrigan (b. 1987, United States), poet & wr.
- Willy Corsari (1897–1998, Netherlands), nv., pw. & ch.
- Sarah Cortez (living, United States), poet, editor & es.
- Jayne Cortez (1936–2012, United States), poet & artist
- Maria Corti (1915–2002, Italy), philologist, critic & nv.
- Mary Corylé (1894–1976, Ecuador), wr. & poet
- Giselle Cossard (1923–2016, Morocco/Brazil), anthropologist
- Alicia Yánez Cossío (b. 1928, Ecuador), poet & nv.
- Lola Costa (1903–2004, England), painter, wr. & poet
- Margherita Costa (c. 1600 – post-1657, Italy), poet & pw.
- Maria Velho da Costa (1938–2020, Portugal), wr.
- Mary Costello (living, Ireland), fiction wr.
- Saskia De Coster (b. 1976, Belgium), wr. in Flemish
- Sophie Ristaud Cottin (1770–1807, France), nv.
- Dorothy Cottrell (1902–1957, Australia), nv.
- Violet May Cottrell (1887–1971, New Zealand), wr., poet & spiritualist
- Anna Couani (b. 1948), nv., poet & artist
- Micheline Coulibaly (1950–2003, Ivory Coast/Mexico), fiction & ch. wr.
- Emily Coungeau (1860–1936, Australia), poet
- Ajeet Cour (b. 1934, India), nv. & social wr.
- Dilly Court (b. 1940, England), hist. nv.
- Hedwig Courths-Mahler (1867–1950, Germany), nv.
- Joanna Courtmans (1811–1890, Belgium), poet & prose wr. in Flemish
- Arlette Cousture (b. 1948, Canada/Newfoundland), wr.
- Sonia Coutinho (1939–2013, Brazil), fiction wr.
- Dani Couture (b. 1978, Canada/Newfoundland), poet & nv.
- Jessie Couvreur (1848–1897, Australia), nv.
- Jeni Couzyn (b. 1942, South Africa/Canada/Newfoundland), poet & ch. wr. in English
- Ena Fitzgerald (1889–1962, England), nv., poet, ss. wr.
- Hannah Cowley (1743–1809, England), pw. & poet
- Joy Cowley (b. 1936, New Zealand), nv. & ch. wr.
- Roz Cowman (b. 1942, Ireland), poet & critic
- E. E. Cowper (1859–1933, England), nv.
- Josephine Cox (1938–2020, England), nv.
- Martine Le Coz (b. 1955, France), nv.

=== Cr–Cz ===
- Ioana Crăciunescu (b. 1950, Romania), poet & actor
- Fanny Cradock (1909–1994, England), cookery wr.
- Sara Jane Crafts (1845–1930, United States), non-f. wr.
- Christine Craig (b. 1943, Jamaica/United States), ch. wr. & poet
- Cola Barr Craig (1861–1930, United States), nv. & ss. wr.
- Mary Craig (1928–2019, England), journalist & wr.
- Mary Lynde Craig (1834–1921, United States), wr., teacher & activist
- Nicole Craig (b. 1974, Trinidad), poet & fiction wr.
- Dinah Mulock Craik (1826–1887, England), nv.
- Helen Craik (1751–1825, Scotland), nv.
- Harriet L. Cramer (1847–1922, United States), editor, publisher
- Hazel Crane (1951–2003, Ireland/South Africa), mem.
- Nathalia Crane (1913–1998, United States), poet & nv.
- Sibylla Bailey Crane (1851–1902, United States), educator, composer, non-f. wr.
- Mary Rankin Cranston (1873-1931, United States) – non-fiction wr.
- Elizabeth Azcona Cranwell (1933–2004), poet & fiction wr.
- Margaret Craven (1901–1980, United States), nv.
- Pauline Marie Armande Craven (1808–1891, France), wr. & autobiographer
- Rachael Craw (living, New Zealand), nv. & YA wr.
- Emily Crawford (1841–1915, Ireland/France), col. & biographer
- Isabella Valancy Crawford (1850–1887, Canada/Newfoundland), poet
- Mabel Sharman Crawford (1820–1912, Ireland), travel wr.
- Susan P. Crawford (b. 1963, United States), law professor
- Máirín Cregan (1891–1975, Ireland), pw., nv. & ch. wr.
- Jane Tapsubei Creider (b. 1940s, Kenya), autobiographer, nv, fiction and non-f. wr
- Barbara Creed (b. 1943, Australia), non-f. and film theorist
- Hélisenne de Crenne (c. 1510–1552, France), nv. & correspondent
- Jasmine Cresswell (b. 1941, Wales), nv.
- Julia Pleasants Creswell (1827–1886, United States), poet, nv
- Alice Guerin Crist (1876–1941, Australia), poet, fiction wr. & col.
- Judith Crist (1922–2012, United States), film critic
- Ann Batten Cristall (1769–1848, England), poet
- Maria Sonia Cristoff (b. 1965, Argentina), fiction & non-f. wr.
- Alison Croggon (b. 1962, Argentina), poet, pw. & nv.
- Bithia Mary Croker (1849–1920, Ireland/India), travel wr.
- May Crommelin (1850–1930, Ireland/England), nv. & travel wr.
- M. T. C. Cronin (b. 1963, Australia), wr.
- Judy Croome (b. 1958, Zimbabwe/South Africa), fiction wr. & poet
- Camilla Dufour Crosland (1812–1895, England), wr. & poet
- Elsa Cross (b. 1946, Mexico), poet & es.
- Fiona Cross (living, New Zealand), arachnologist
- Zora Cross (1890–1964, Australia), poet & prose wr.
- Sarah Crossan (living, Ireland), YA wr.
- Julia Crottie (1853 – c. 1930, Ireland/United States), nv.
- Karen Crouse (living, United States), wr.
- Alev Croutier (b. 1954, Turkey/Ottoman Empire/United States), non-f. wr.
- Catherine Crowe (1800–1876, England), pw., nv. & ch. book wr.
- Helen Cruickshank (1886–1975, Scotland), poet in Braid Scots & English
- Coralie van den Cruyce (1796–1858, Belgium), pw. in French
- Aixa de la Cruz (b. 1988, Spain), fiction wr.
- Conchitina Cruz (living, Philippines), poet & academic
- Juana Inés de la Cruz (1651–1695, Mexico), poet, pw. and nun
- Gabriella Csire (b. 1938, Romania), ch. wr. in Hungarian
- Cristina Fernández Cubas (b. 1945, Spain), fiction wr.
- María Guadalupe Cuenca (1790–1854, Bolivia), letter writer
- Mireya Cueto (1922–2013, Mexico), wr. & puppeteer
- Briceida Cuevas (b. 1969, Mexico), poet in Mayan
- Anne Virginia Culbertson (1857–1918, United States), poet, wr.
- Belle Caldwell Culbertson (1857–1934, United States), non.f. wr.
- Diana Çuli (b. 1951, Albania), wr. & politician
- Catherine Ann Cullen (living, Ireland), poet
- Majella Cullinane (living, Ireland/New Zealand), nv. & poet
- Meta Davis Cumberbatch (1900–1978, Trinidad/Bahamas), poet, pw. & activist
- Jackie Cumming (living, New Zealand), health-care wr. & academic
- Alissandra Cummins (b. 1958, Barbados), non-f. wr.
- Geraldine Cummins (1890–1969, Ireland), spiritualist, nv. & pw.
- Maria Susanna Cummins (1827–1866, United States), nv.
- Anne Cuneo (1936–2015, Switzerland), nv. in French
- Lady Margaret Cunningham (died c. 1622, Scotland), mem. & correspondent
- Pat Cumper (b. 1954, England), pw.
- Helena Parente Cunha (1929–2023, Brazil), wr. & educator
- Maria Renee Cura (died 2007, Argentina), non-f. wr.
- Cecilia Curbelo (b. 1975, Uruguay), wr. & col.
- Suzanne Curchod (1737–1794, Switzerland/France), social mem. in French
- Jean Curlewis (1898–1930, Argentina), ch. wr.
- Judi Curtin (b. 1960s, Ireland), ch. wr.
- Nannie Webb Curtis (1861–1920, United States), non-f. wr. & ed.
- Ursula Curtiss (1923–1984, United States), mystery writer
- Dymphna Cusack (1902–1981, Australia), nv. & pw.
- Margaret Anna Cusack (1829–1999, Ireland), biographer, social wr. & nun
- Silvia Rivera Cusicanqui (b. 1949, Bolivia), historian & feminist
- Rachel Cusk (b. 1967, Canada/Newfoundland), nv.
- Sheila Cussons (1922–2004, South Africa), poet in Afrikaans
- Catherine Cuthbertson (c. 1775–1842, England), nv.
- Umihana Čuvidina (c. 1794 – c. 1870, Turkey/Ottoman Empire/Bosnia-Herzegovina), poet
- Eunice P. Cutter (1819–1898), American, anatomy textbooks
- Aleksandra Čvorović (b. 1976, Yugoslavia/Bosnia-Herzegovina), wr. & librarian
- Ptolemais of Cyrene (3rd century BC or later, Ancient Greece), wr. on music
- Izabela Czartoryska (1846–1935, Poland), Enlightenment wr.
- Julie E. Czerneda (b. 1955, Canada/Newfoundland), science fiction & fantasy wr.
- Sidney Czira (1889–1974, Ireland/United States), wr. & broadcaster

== D ==
=== Da–Dh ===
- Selma Dabbagh (b. 1970, Scotland/Palestine), fiction wr.
- Emma Dabiri (b. 1979, Ireland/England), wr., academic & broadcaster
- Maria Dąbrowska (1889–1965, Poland), nv., es. & pw.
- Anne Dacier (1645–1720, France), scholar & translator
- Luísa Dacosta (1927–2015, Portugal), fiction wr., poet & diarist
- Esha Dadawala (b. 1985, India), poet & fiction wr.
- Aneta Dadeshkeliani (1872–1922, Georgia (Caucasus)), poet & social reformer
- Nino Dadeshkeliani (1890–1931, Georgia (Caucasus)), wr. & politician
- Stella Dadzie (b. 1952, England), activist & historian
- Emilia Dafni (1881–1941, Greece), poet, fiction wr. & pw.
- Catrin Dafydd (b. c. 1982, Wales), wr. & poet
- Fflur Dafydd (b. 1978, Wales), nv. & musician
- Vilborg Dagbjartsdóttir (1930–2021, Iceland), poet
- Elizabeth Frances Dagley (1788–1853, England), ch. wr.
- Marianna Debes Dahl (b. 1947, Faroe Islands), fiction & ch. wr.
- Tora Dahl (1886–1983, Sweden), nv. & educator
- Ulla Dahlerup (b. 1942, Denmark), wr. & rights activist
- Dai Houying (戴厚英, 1938–1996, China), nv.
- Tamaki Daido (大道珠貴, b. 1966, Japan), radio scriptwriter & nv.
- Lois Daish (living, New Zealand), food & cookery wr.
- Jocelyne Dakhlia (b. 1959, France), historian & anthropologist
- Marguerite Dale (1883–1963, Australia), pw. & feminist
- Debra Daley (living, New Zealand), nv. & screenwriter
- Yrsa Daley-Ward (b. 1989, England), poet
- Gilberte H. Dallas (1918–1960, France/Switzerland), poet
- Ruth Dallas (1919–2008, New Zealand), poet & ch. wr.
- Ann Dally (1929–2007, England), wr. & psychiatrist
- Ita Daly (b. 1945, Ireland), fiction & ch. writer
- Mary E. Daly (living, Ireland), historian & academic
- Kathleen Dalziel (1881–1969, Australia), poet
- Achta Saleh Damane (living, Chad), wr. & politician
- Svetla Damyanovska (living, Bulgaria), poet & fiction wr.
- Virgilia D'Andrea (1888–1933, Italy), poet & politician
- Jordan Dane (b. 1953, United States), thriller wr.
- Charlotte Daneau de Muy (1694–1759, Canada), ursuline & non-f. wr.
- Utta Danella (1920–2015, Germany), fiction wr.
- Simin Daneshvar (1921–2012, Iran/Persia), fiction wr. & academic
- Tsitsi Dangarembga (b. 1959, Zimbabwe), wr. & filmmaker
- Ana Daniel (1928–2011, Portugal), poet
- Anna Dániel (1908–2003, Hungary), nv. & YA wr.
- Cora Linn Daniels (1852–1934, United States), wr.
- Tatyana Danilyants (b. 1971, Soviet Union/Russia), poet & film director
- Mabel Dove Danquah (1910–1984, Ghana/Gold Coast), fiction wr.
- Meri Nana-Ama Danquah (b. 1967, Ghana/Gold Coast/United States), wr. & editor
- Edwidge Danticat (b. 1969, Haiti/United States), nv.
- Zakya Daoud (b. 1937, France/Morocco), sociologist & historian
- Xie Daoyun (謝道韞, pre-AD 340 – post-399, China), poet & calligrapher
- Mildred Darby (1867–1932, Ireland), nv.
- Ailbhe Darcy (b. 1981, Ireland), poet
- Eleanor Dark (1901–1985, Australia), nv.
- Amma Darko (b. 1956, Ghana/Gold Coast), nv.
- Annie McCarer Darlington (1836–1907, United States), poet
- Tina Darragh (b. 1950, United States), poet
- Marie Darrieussecq (b. 1969, France), nv., biographer & ch. wr.
- Cecilia Dart-Thornton (living, Australia), fantasy wr.
- Helen Darville (Helen Dale, Helen Demidenko; b. 1972, Australia), col. & nv.
- Kamala Das (1932–2009, India), poet & fiction wr.
- Mahadai Das (1954–2003, Guyana), poet
- Countess Dash (1804–1872, France), nv.
- Filomena Dato (1856–1926, Spain), feminist, wr.
- Sukanya Datta (b. 1961, India), zoologist & science wr.
- Marcia Davenport (1903–1996, United States), nv., biographer & mem.
- Selina Davenport (1779–1859, England), nv.
- Gertrud David (1872–1936, Germany), screenwriter and col.
- Henriette Davidis (1801–1876, Germany), cookery wr.
- Joy Davidman (b. Helen Joy Davidman, 1915–1960, United States), wr. & poet
- Alexandra David-Néel (1868–1969, France), traveler, wr. & Buddhist
- Nadia Davids (b. 1977, South Africa), wr. & pw. in English
- MaryJanice Davidson (b. 1969, United States), poet
- Catherine Glyn Davies (1926–2007, Wales), philosopher & historian
- Gwen Davies (b. 1964, Wales), translator & editor
- Margaret Davies (c. 1700–1778 or 1785, Wales), poet & scribe
- Mary Davies (1846–1882, Wales), poet
- Amparo Dávila (1928–2020, Mexico), fiction wr.
- Delia Davin (1944–2016, England), wr. on Chinese society
- Winnie Davin (1909–1995, New Zealand/England), wr. & editor
- Angela Davis (b. 1944, United States), philosopher & activist
- Bridgett M. Davis (living, United States), nv. & filmmaker
- Dorothy Salisbury Davis (1916−2014, United States), mystery nv.
- Jackie Davis (b. 1963, New Zealand), nv., poet & pw.
- Kyra Davis (b. 1972, United States), nv.
- Lydia Davis (b. 1947, United States), fiction wr. & es.
- Mary Hayes Davis (c.1884–1948, United States), folklore wr. & news editor
- Norma Davis (1905–1945, Australia), poet
- Rebecca Harding Davis (1831–1910, United States), nv. & col.
- Annabel Davis-Goff (b. 1942, Ireland/United States), nv., screenwriter & academic
- Vilborg Davíðsdóttir (b. 1965, Iceland), wr.
- Hadiya Davletshina (1905–1954, Russia/Soviet Union), poet & pw.
- Mary Davys (c. 1674–1732, Ireland), nv. & pw.
- Elizabeth Dawbarn (died 1839, England), wr. on religion & child care
- Abha Dawesar (b. 1974, India), nv. & artist
- Pieretta Dawn (b. 1994, Thailand), wr. in English
- Laura Day (b. 1959, United States), self-help wr.
- Sarah Day (b. 1958, England/Australia), poet
- Suzanne R. Day (1876–1964, Ireland), nv. & pw.
- Tamasin Day-Lewis (b. 1953, England), cookery wr. & TV chef
- Jean D'Costa (b. 1937, Jamaica), ch. wr. & linguist
- Shobhaa De (b. 1947, India), col. & nv.
- Janette Deacon (b. 1939, South Africa), archaeologist in English
- Dulcie Deamer (1890–1972, Australia), nv., poet & actor
- Louise Dean (b. 1970, England)
- Pamela Dean (b. 1953, United States), nv.
- Kathryn Deans (living, Australia), ch. wr.
- Alice Dease (1874–1949, Ireland), wr. & folklorist
- Charlotte Dease (1873–1953, Ireland), prayer collector & hagiographer
- Djamila Debèche (1926–2010, Algeria/France), nv. & es.
- Nicole de Buron (1929–2019, France), wr.
- Denise Deegan (b. 1966, Ireland), screenwriter & fiction wr.
- Teresa Deevy (1894–1963, Ireland), pw. & fiction wr.
- Charlotte Burgis DeForest (1879–1973, United States), wr.
- Régine Deforges (1935–2014, France), nv. & es.
- Ellen DeGeneres (b. 1958, United States), wr. & comedian
- Sadia Dehlvi (1957–2020, India), activist, wr. & col.
- Sabine Deitmer (1947–2020, Germany), crime wr.
- Draga Dejanović (1840–1871, Serbia), poet
- Aagje Deken (1701–1804, Netherlands), poet & correspondent
- E. M. Delafield (1890–1943, England), nv. & mem.
- Lucy Delaney (c. 1830–c. 1890, United States), mem.
- Mary Delany (1700–1788, England), correspondent & Bluestocking
- Alix Delaporte (b. 1969, France), screenwriter & film director
- Lucie Delarue-Mardrus (1874–1945, France), poet, nv. & col.
- Elizabeth Delaval (c.1648–1717), British memoirist
- Cella Delavrancea (1887–1991, Romania), fiction wr, mem. & musician
- Florence Delay (1941–2025, France), academic & actor
- Grazia Deledda (1871–1936, Italy), nv. & poet; 1926 Nobel Prize for Literature
- Yanette Delétang-Tardif (1902–1976, France), poet, translator & nv.
- Nieves Delgado (b. 1968, Spain), nv.
- Susy Delgado (b. 1949, Paraguay), poet & wr. in Spanish & Guarani
- Sahar Delijani (b. 1983, Iran/Persia), nv.
- Ella Cara Deloria (1888–1971, United States), ethnographer, historian & nv.
- Jeanine Delpech (1905–1992, France), journalist, translator & nv.
- Penelope Delta (1874–1941, Greece), ch. wr. & nv.
- Gabriëlle Demedts (1909–2002, Belgium), poet in Flemish
- Rita Demeester (1946–1993), Belgium), poet & wr. in Flemish
- Esther Dendel (1910–2002), American non-fiction writer
- Radka Denemarková (b. 1968, Czechoslovakia/Czech Republic), nv. & screenplay wr.
- Zsófia Dénes (1885–1987, Hungary), critic & biographer
- Irina Denezhkina (b. 1981, Soviet Union/Russia), fiction wr.
- Marina Denikina (1919–2005, Russia/France), political historian
- Sylvie Denis (b. 1963, France), science fiction wr.
- Yvonne Denis Rosario (b. 1967, Puerto Rico), storyteller, poet, professor
- Nicole Dennis-Benn (b. 1982, Jamaica), nv. & story wr.
- Márcia Denser (b. 1949, Brazil), wr. & academic
- Laurence Deonna (1937–2023, Switzerland), political wr. in French
- Anna dePeyster (1944–2026, Scotland/Australia), nv.
- Maria Deraismes (1828–1894, France), feminist wr.
- Raghida Dergham (b. 1953, Lebanon/United States), col.
- Enid Derham (1882–1941, Australia), poet
- Regina Derieva (1949–2013, Soviet Union/Russia), poet & wr.
- Maria Dermoût (1888–1962, Netherlands), nv.
- Jeanne Deroin (1805–1894, France), political wr.
- Sophie Deroisin (1909–1994, Belgium), nv. in French
- Toi Derricotte (b. 1941, United States), poet
- Suat Derviş (1904 or 1905–1972, Turkey/Ottoman Empire), nv. & activist
- Dominika Dery (b. 1975, Czechoslovakia/Czech Republic), poet & mem.
- Anita Desai (b. 1937, India), nv.
- Kamal Desai (1928–2011, India), nv.
- Kiran Desai (b. 1971, India), nv.
- Dominique Desanti (1920–2011, France), nv., biographer & col.
- Agnès Desarthe (b. 1966, France), nv. & ch. wr.
- Maryline Desbiolles (b. 1959, France), wr.
- Marceline Desbordes-Valmore (1786–1859, France), poet
- Anne Desclos, 1907–1998, France), col. & nv.
- Antoinette du Ligier de la Garde Deshoulières (1638–1694, France), poet
- Dhanashree Deshpande-Ganatra (born 1970, India), poet
- Gauri Deshpande (1942–2003, India), fiction wr. & poet
- Shashi Deshpande (b. 1938, India), nv.
- Sunita Deshpande (1926–2009, India), wr.
- Roxane Desjardins (b. 1991), Canada), wr.
- Marie-Anne Desmarest (1904–1973, France), nv.
- Pip Desmond (living, New Zealand), social wr.
- Virginie Despentes (b. 1969, France), nv.
- Marie Desplechin (b. 1959, France), fiction & ch. wr.
- Madeleine Desroseaux (1873–1939, France), poet & nv.
- Victoria de Stefano (1940–2023, Italy/Venezuela), nv. & es.
- Jessica Dettmann (living, Australia), nv.
- Babette Deutsch (1895–1982, United States), poet, critic, & nv.
- Jean Devanny (1894–1962, Australia), fiction & non-f. wr.
- Alexis De Veaux (b. 1948, United States), wr. & illustrator
- Mary Deverell (1731–1805, England), religious wr. & poet
- Ashapoorna Devi (1909–1995, India), nv. & poet
- Leela Devi (1932–1998, India), wr. & educator
- Mahasweta Devi (1926–2016, India), nv. & wr.
- Maitreyi Devi (1914–1990, India), poet & nv.
- M. K. Binodini Devi (1922–2011, India), fiction wr. & pw.
- Nalini Bala Devi (1898–1977, India), poet & writer
- Nirupama Devi (1883–1951, India), fiction wr.
- Prasannamoyee Devi (1856–1939, British India) non-f wr. & poet.
- Priyamvada Devi ((1871–1935), British India), pw. & poet.
- Vimala Devi (b. 1932, Goa/Spain),
- Martina Devlin (living, Ireland), nv. & col.
- Polly Devlin (b. 1944, wr. & broadcaster
- Caroline Dexter (1819–1884, England/Australia), feminist
- Leena Dhingra (living, India/England), wr. & actor
- Éilís Ní Dhuibhne (b. 1954, Ireland), fiction wr.
- Christine D'haen (1923–2009), wr. & poet in French
- Dhuoda (c. 803–c. 843, France), moralist in Latin; Liber Manualis

=== Di–Dy ===
- Ndèye Coumba Mbengue Diakhaté (1924–2001, Senegal), poet & educator
- Nafissatou Niang Diallo (1941–1982, Senegal), social wr. & mem.
- Aïssatou Diamanka-Besland (b. 1972, Senegal), nv. & lyricist
- Anita Diamant (b. 1951, United States), fiction & non-f. wr.
- Máirín Diamond (b. 1957, Ireland), poet
- Olga Xirinacs Díaz (b. 1936, Spain), wr. & musician
- Marta Yolanda Díaz-Durán (b. 1968, Guatemala), academic
- Paloma Díaz-Mas (b. 1954, Spain), nv. & pw.
- Juana Dib (1924–2015, Argentina), poet, journalist, teacher
- Kate DiCamillo (b. 1964, United States), ch. wr.
- Adelia Di Carlo (1883–1965, Argentina), wr., chronicler, founder
- Monica Dickens (1915–1992, England), nv. & mem.
- Emily Dickinson (1830–1886, United States), poet
- Susan E. Dickinson (1842–1915, United States), correspondent
- Joan Didion (1934–2021, United States), col., es. & nv.
- Maria Teresa Cruz San Diego (living, Philippines), nv. in Tagalog
- Alice Mangold Diehl (1844–1912, England), nv. & musician
- Mame Younousse Dieng (1939–2016, Senegal), nv. & poet
- Carole Dieschbourg (b. 1977, Luxembourg), writer & politician
- Florence Carpenter Dieudonné (1850–1927, United States), fiction wr.
- Jane Dieulafoy (1851–1916, France), archaeologist & nv.
- Margarita Diez-Colunje y Pombo (1838–1919, Colombia), historian, translator, genealogist
- Annie Le Porte Diggs (1853–1916, Canada/Newfoundland), poet & wr.
- Emilia Dilke (1840–1904, England), social wr. & art critic
- Annie Dillard (b. 1945, United States), non-f. wr., poet & nv.
- Eilís Dillon (1920–1994, Ireland), nv. & YA wr.
- Amy Dillwyn (1845–1935, Wales), nv.
- Ophelia Dimalanta (1932–2010, Philippines), poet, wr. & teacher
- Lidija Dimkovska (b. 1971, North Macedonia/Slovenia), poet, nv. & translator
- Jelena Dimitrijević (1862–1945, Serbia), fiction wr. & poet
- Blaga Dimitrova (1922–2003, Belgium), poet & politician
- Kristin Dimitrova (b. 1963, Bulgaria), wr. & poet
- Kiki Dimoula (1931–2020, Greece), poet
- Theodora Dimova (b. 1960, Bulgaria), nv. & pw.
- Isak Dinesen (1885–1962, Denmark), nv.; Out of Africa
- Ding Ling (丁玲, 1904–1986, China), nv.
- Güzin Dino (1910–2013, Turkey/Ottoman Empire/France), scholar & political wr.
- Fatou Diome (b. 1968, Senegal), nv.
- Nafissatou Dia Diouf (b. 1973, Senegal), poet & fiction wr.
- Farida Diouri (1953–2004, Morocco), nv. in French
- Kelly DiPucchio (b. 1967, United States), ch. wr.
- Zora Dirnbach (1929–2019, Croatia), journalist & wr.
- Jenny Diski (1947–2016, England), wr.
- Clotilde Dissard (1873–1919, France), journalist, feminist
- Tove Ditlevsen (1917–1976, Denmark), poet, nv. & autobiographer
- Chitra Banerjee Divakaruni (b. 1956, India/United States), poet & fiction wr.
- Margaret A. Dix (1939–2025, Channel Islands/Guatemala), botanist
- Lady Florence Dixie (1855–1905, Scotland), travel, war & fiction wr.
- Varsha Dixit (living, India/United States), nv.
- Isobel Dixon (b. 1969, South Africa), poet in English
- Négar Djavadi (b. 1969, Iran/Persia/France), nv. & screenwriter
- Assia Djebar (1936–2015, Algeria), nv. & filmmaker
- Rabia Djelti (b. 1954, Algeria), poet, nv. & educator
- Elena Djionat (1888 – post-1936, Romania), political wr. & activist
- Anastasia Dmitruk (b. 1991, Ukraine), poet
- Valentina Dmitryeva (1859–1947, Russia/Soviet Union), fiction wr.
- Gillian Dobbie (living, New Zealand), computer scientist
- Louisa Emily Dobrée (fl. ca. 1877–1917, France), nv., ss. wr., juvenile wr. & non-f. wr.
- Rosemary Dobson (1920–2012, Australia), poet
- Anna Bowman Dodd (1858–1929, United States), wr.
- Lynley Dodd (b. 1941, New Zealand), ch. wr. & illustrator
- Mary Mapes Dodge (1831–1905, United States), ch. wr.; Hans Brinker, or The Silver Skates
- Mary Ann Hanmer Dodd (1813–1878, United States), poet
- Mary Diana Dods (David Lyndsay, 1790–1830, Scotland), fiction wr.
- Anna Dodsworth (c. 1740–1801, Britain), poet
- Thea Doelwijt (b. 1938, Suriname), fiction & ch. wr. & pw.
- Harriet Doerr (1910–2002, United States), nv.
- Mary Crow Dog (1954–2013, United States), wr. & activist
- Brenda DoHarris (living, Guyana), poet
- Ann Doherty (c. 1786 – c. 1831–1832, England), nv. & pw.
- Berlie Doherty (b. 1943, England), nv., poet & ch. wr.
- Dorcas Dole (fl. later 17th century, England), Quaker pamphleteer
- Veronika Dolina (b. 1956, Soviet Union/Russia), poet & songwriter
- Elvira Dolinar (1870–1961, Austria/Austria-Hungary/Yugoslavia), col. in Slovenian
- Emma Dolujanoff (1922–2013, Mexico), wr.
- Janina Domanska (1913–1995, Poland/United States), ch. wr. & illustrator
- Alcina Lubitch Domecq (b. 1953, Guatemala/Israel), fiction wr.
- Maria Doménech (1877–1954, Spain), nv., poet & pw.
- Hilde Domin (1909–2006, Germany), poet
- Anni Domingo (b. 1950s, England), nv., poet & pw
- Delia Domínguez (1931–2022, Chile), poet
- María Domínguez (1882–1936, Spain), poet & politician
- María Magdalena Domínguez (1922–2021, Spain), poet
- Lady Margaret Domville (1840–1929, Ireland), religious wr.
- Robyn Donald (b. 1940, New Zealand), nv.
- Elvira Dones (b. 1960, Albania/Switzerland), nv. & screenwriter
- Marion Dönhoff (1909–2002), col.
- Maite Dono (b. 1969, Spain), poet & songwriter
- Emma Donoghue (b. 1969, Ireland/Canada/Newfoundland), pw., nv. & literary historian
- Darya Dontsova (b. 1952, Soviet Union/Russia), fiction & scriptwriter
- Compiuta Donzella (fl. late 13th century, Italy), poet
- Maria Doolaeghe (1803–1884, Belgium), wr. in Flemish
- Aoife Dooley (b. 1991, Ireland), wr. & illustrator
- Robyn Doolittle (b. 1984, Canada/Newfoundland), col.
- Carolina Marcial Dorado (1889–1941, Spain/United States), textbook wr.
- Mary Dorcey (b. 1950, Ireland), poet & fiction wr.
- Mara Đorđević-Malagurski (1894–1971, Serbia), wr. & ethnologist
- Geneviève Dormann (1933–2015, France), fiction wr. & col.
- Renate Dorrestein (1954–2018, Netherlands), fiction wr. & feminist
- Mathilda d'Orozco (Mathilda Montgomery-Cederhjelm; 1796–1863, Italy/Sweden), salonnière, poet & wr.
- Doris Dörrie (b. 1955, Germany), fiction & ch. wr. & critic
- Anna Dostoevskaya (1846–1918, Russia), mem. & philatelist
- Lyubov Dostoyevskaya (1869–1926, Russia/Italy), mem.
- Sarah Doudney (1841–1926, England), ch. wr. & poet
- Debbie Dougherty (fl. 1880s, USA), academic, non-fiction wr.
- Ellen Douglas (1921–2012, United States), fiction & non-f. wr.
- Mona Douglas (1898–1987, Isle of Man), poet & folklorist
- Myra Douglas (1844–?, United States), wr., poet
- O. Douglas (1877–1948, Scotland), nv.
- Sara Douglass (1957–2011, Australia), fantasy nv.
- Maro Douka (b. 1947, Gk), nv.
- Teresa Dovalpage (b. 1966, Cuba/United States), nv.
- Nah Dove (b. 1940s, UK), non-f. wr.
- Rita Dove (b. 1952, United States), poet
- Ceridwen Dovey (b. 1980, South Africa/Australia), nv.
- Beatrice von Dovsky (1866–1923, Austria/Austria-Hungary), poet, librettist & actor
- Unity Dow (b. 1959, Botswana), activist & nv.
- Mary Frances Dowdall (1876–1939, England), nv. & non-f. wr.
- Sediqeh Dowlatabadi (1882–1961, Iran/Persia), correspondent
- Finuala Dowling (b. 1962, South Africa), poet & nv. in English
- Ellen Mary Patrick Downing (1828–1969, Ireland), poet & nun
- Mary Downing (c. 1815–1881, Ireland/England), poet
- Margaret Drabble (b. 1939, England), nv. & biographer
- Emmy Drachmann (1854–1928, Denmark), nv. & mem.
- Gusta Dawidson Draenger (1917–1943, Poland), diarist & Hc. victim
- Ulrike Draesner (b. 1962, Germany), poet & nv. & es.
- Rajna Dragićević (living, Serbia), lexicographer & academic
- Tonke Dragt (1930–2024, Netherlands), ch. wr. & illustrator
- Judith Drake (late 17th century, England), feminist es.
- Slavenka Drakulić (b. 1949, Yugoslavia/Croatia), nv. & es.
- Augusta Theodosia Drane (1823–1894, England), religious wr. & biographer
- Camille Drevet (1881–1969, France), non-f. wr.
- Catharine Drew (1832–1910, Ireland/England), nv. & col.
- Ingeborg Drewitz (1923–1986, Germany), pw. & nv.
- Paola Drigo (1876–1938, Italy), fiction wr.
- Daša Drndić (1946–2018, Yugoslavia/Croatia), nv. & pw.
- Edwige-Renée Dro (living, Ivory Coast), wr. & activist
- Celia Dropkin (1887–1956, Belarus/United States), poet in Yiddish
- Annette von Droste-Hülshoff (1797–1848, Germany), poet
- Joan Druett (b. 1939, New Zealand), nv. & historian
- Alison Drummond (1903–1984, New Zealand), historian & farmer
- Ree Drummond (b. 1969, United States), wr. & food wr.
- Yulia Drunina (1924–1991, Soviet Union), poet & fiction wr.
- Anna Harriett Drury (1824–1912, England), poet & nv.
- Helene von Druskowitz (1856–1918, Austria/Austria-Hungary), pw., critic & poet
- Elżbieta Drużbacka (1695/1698–1765, Poland), poet
- Svetlana Druzhinina (b. 1935, Soviet Union/Russia), screenwriter & actor
- Nora Dryhurst (1856–1930, Ireland/England), wr. & translator
- Duan Shuqing (端淑卿, c. 1510 – c. 1600, China), poet
- Caitilin Dubh (fl. c. 1624, Ireland), poet
- Caroline Dubois (b. 1960, France), poet
- Dorothea Du Bois (1728–1774, Ireland), poet, autobiographer & pw.
- Ursula Dubosarsky (b. 1961, Australia), ch. & YA fiction & non-f. wr.
- Louis Dubrau (1904–1997, Belgium), fiction wr. & poet in French
- Charlotte Dubreuil (b. 1940, France), nv. & filmmaker
- Marilyn Duckworth (b. 1935, New Zealand), fiction wr. & poet
- Agnes Mary Frances Duclaux (1857–1944, England), poet, nv., es., literary critic & translator
- Diane Ducret (B), fiction & non-f. wr.
- Tessa Duder (b. 1940, New Zealand), YA, fiction & non-f. wr. & pw.
- María Dueñas (b. 1964, Spain), nv.
- Lucie, Lady Duff-Gordon (1821–1869, England/Egypt), history wr. & Arabist
- Bella Duffy (1849–1926, Ireland/Italy), writer
- Carol Ann Duffy (b. 1955, Scotland), poet & pw.; first female & Scottish Poet Laureate of the United Kingdom
- Catherine Dufour (b. 1966, France), science fiction & fantasy nv.
- Eileen Duggan (1894–1972, New Zealand), poet & col.
- Kate Duignan (b. 1974, New Zealand), fiction wr. & educator
- Yolanda Vargas Dulché (1926–1999, Mexico), cartoon wr.
- Nurduran Duman (b. 1974, Turkey/Ottoman Empire), poet & pw.
- Firoozeh Dumas (b. 1965, Iran/Persia/United States), mem. & nv.
- Bucura Dumbravă (1868–1926, Romania), nv. & theosophist
- Zoe Dumitrescu-Bușulenga (1920–2006, Romania), political wr.
- Marilyn Dumont (b. 1955, Canada/Newfoundland), poet
- Sarah Dunant (b. 1950, England), nv.
- Raya Dunayevskaya (1910–1987, Ukraine/United States), philosopher
- Andrea Dunbar (1961–1990, England), pw.
- Lois Duncan (1934–2016, United States), YA wr.
- Susan Duncan (1951–2024, Australia), mem. & nv.
- Elaine Dundy (1931–2008, United States), col., nv. & biographer
- Camille Dungy (b. 1972, United States), poet & professor
- Mabel Dunham (1881–1957, Canada/Newfoundland), nv.
- Kinga Dunin (b. 1954, Poland), nv. & sociologist
- Clare B. Dunkle (b. 1964, United States), ch. fantasy wr. & librarian
- Gloria Dünkler (b. 1977, Chile), poet & folklorist
- Nell Dunn (b. 1936, UK), pw. & screenwriter
- Katherine Dunn (1945–2016, United States), nv., col. & poet
- Rachel Blau DuPlessis (b. 1941, United States), poet, es. & scholar
- Maria José Dupré (1905–1984, Brazil), nv.
- Mary Durack (1913–1994, Australia), nv. & ch. wr.
- Ariel Durant (1898–1981, Ukraine/United States), social philosopher & mem.
- Francesca Duranti (b. 1935, Italy), fiction wr.
- Claire de Duras (1777–1828, France), nv.
- Marguerite Duras (1914–1996, France), nv., pw. & screenwriter
- Bohdana Durda (b. 1940, Ukraine), wr., poet & song wr.
- Vanessa Duriès (1972–1993, France), nv.
- Jessica Durlacher (b. 1961, Netherlands), critic & nv.
- Ljiljana Habjanović Đurović (b. 1953, Serbia), nv.
- Tehmina Durrani (b. 1953, Pakistan), wr. & activist
- Marie Dušková (1903–1968, Czechoslovakia/Czech Republic), poet
- Nirupama Dutt (b. 1955, India), poet
- Toru Dutt (1856–1877, India/England), poet
- Yvette Duval (1931–2006, Morocco/France), historian
- Karen Duve (b. 1961, Germany), fiction wr.
- Mona Van Duyn (1921–2004, United States), poet
- Gergina Dvoretzka (living, Belgium), poet & col.
- Maryna and Serhiy Dyachenko (b. 1968 & 1945–2022, Ukraine/United States), novelists
- Xenia Dyakonova (b. 1985, Russia), poet, translator
- Wanda Dynowska (1888–1971, Poland), theosophist & political wr.

== E ==
=== Ea–Em ===
- Elizabeth Jessup Eames (1813–1856, United States), wr. & poet
- Marion Eames (1921–2007, Wales), nv. & translator
- Mary Tracy Earle (1864–1955, United States), wr.
- Joan Adeney Easdale (1913–1998, England), poet
- Beverley East (b. 1953, Jamaica), wr.
- Alice Eather (1988/1989–2017, Australia), poet & environmentalist
- Edith Maude Eaton (Sui Sin Far; 1865–1914, Chile/Canada/Newfoundland), nv.
- Winnifred Eaton (Watanna Onoto; 1875–1954, Chile/Canada/Newfoundland), fiction wr.
- Françoise d'Eaubonne (1920–2005, France), es. & nv.
- Shirin Ebadi (b. 1947, Iran/Persia), activist; Nobel Peace Prize 2003
- Isabelle Eberhardt (1877–1904, Switzerland/Algeria), political wr. in French
- Margareta Ebner (1291–1351, Germany), diarist & mystic
- Marie von Ebner-Eschenbach (1830–1916, Austria/Austria-Hungary), nv.
- Charlotte O'Conor Eccles (1860–1911, Ireland), nv. & translator
- Fadela Echebbi (b. 1946, Tunisia), poet
- Robyn Eckersley (b. 1958, Australia), political theorist
- Elaine Howard Ecklund (living, United States), academic
- Bertha Eckstein-Diener (Sir Galahad, 1874–1948, Austria/Austria-Hungary), historian & travel wr.
- Nydia Ecury (1926–2012, Curaçao), poet & translator
- Leigh Eddings (1939–2007, United States), fantasy nv.
- Reni Eddo-Lodge (b. 1989, England), col. & wr.
- Inger Edelfeldt (b. 1956, Sweden), fiction & ch. wr. & illustrator
- Aida Edemariam (fl. 2014–, Ethiopia/Canada/Newfoundland), col. & mem.
- Dorothy Eden (1912–1982, New Zealand/England), fiction wr.
- Emily Eden (1797–1869, England), nv. & poet
- Arabella Edge (fl. 2000–, England/Australia), fiction wr.
- Zee Edgell (1940–2020, Belize), nv.
- Frances Anne Edgeworth (1769–1865, Ireland), mem. & botanical artist
- Maria Edgeworth (1767–1849, England/Ireland), nv.; Castle Rackrent
- May Edginton (1883–1957, England), nv.
- Lauris Edmond (1924–2000, New Zealand), poet & fiction wr.
- Helen Edmundson (born 1964, England), playwright and screenwriter
- Harriet Edquist (fl. 1989–, Australia), architectural historian
- Esi Edugyan (b. 1978, Canada/Newfoundland), nv. & wr.
- Cordelia Edvardson (1929–2012, Sweden), Hc., mem. & poet
- Summer Edward (b. 1986, Trinidad), wr. & activist
- Amelia Edwards (1831–1892, England), fiction wr. & poet
- Annie Edwards (c. 1830–1896, England), nv.
- Fanny Winifred Edwards (1876–1959, Wales), ch. wr. & teacher
- Ruth Dudley Edwards (b. 1944, Ireland), historian, biographer & crime wr.
- Yvvette Edwards (fl. 2011–, England), nv.
- Zena Edwards (b. 1960s, England), poet
- Françoise Ega (1920–1976, Martinique), nv.
- Jennifer Egan (b. 1962, United States); fiction wr.
- Susanna Eger (1640–1713, Germany), cookery wr.
- Egeria (Aetheria) (fl. AD 381–384, Algeria), pilgrim & correspondent in Latin
- George Egerton (1859–1945, Ireland/England), fiction wr.
- Helen Merrill Egerton (1866–1951, Canada), poet, non-f. wr.
- Elizabeth Eggleston (1934–1976, Australia), wr., activist & lawyer
- Elsebeth Egholm (b. 1960, Denmark), crime wr.
- Elen Egryn (Elin Evans, 1807–1876, Wales), poet
- María Egual (1655–1735, Spain), poet & pw.
- Alicia Eguren (1924–1977, Argentina), poet & es.
- Barbara Ehrenreich (1941–2022, United States), feminist & activist
- Marianne Ehrenström (1773–1867, Sweden), wr.
- Marianne Ehrmann (1755–1795, Switzerland), nv. & publicist in German
- Adelaïde Ehrnrooth (1815–1905, Finland), feminist & wr. in Swedish
- Tamara Eidelman (living, Soviet Union/Russia), historian & educator
- Eiki Eiki (影木栄貴, b. 1971, Japan), manga creator
- Charlotte Eilersgaard (1858–1922, Denmark), fiction wr. & pw.
- Lena Einhorn (b. 1954, Sweden), mem., pw. & screenwriter
- Paula Einöder (b. 1974, Uruguay), poet & wr.
- Oddný Eir (b. 1972, Iceland), nv.
- Kerstin Ekman (b. 1933, Sweden), fiction wr.
- Margareta Ekström (1930–2021, Sweden), poet, nv. & ch. wr.
- Elaine Eksvärd (b. 1981, Sweden), non-f. wr.
- Nana Ekvtimishvili (b. 1978, Georgia (Caucasus)), wr. & film director
- Naima El Bezaz (1974–2020, Morocco/Netherlands), wr.
- Roza Eldarova (1923–2021, Soviet Union/Russia), wr. & politician
- Anne Elder (1918–1976, Australia), poet & dancer
- Olivia Elder (1735–1780, Ireland), poet
- Flora Eldershaw (1897–1956, Australia), nv., critic & historian
- Elephantis (fl. late 1st century BC, Ancient Greece), erotic poet
- Ada María Elflein (1880–1919, Argentina), poet, col. & translator
- Menna Elfyn (b. 1952, Wales), poet, pw. & editor
- Laila el-Haddad (b. 1978, Palestine/United States), wr. on Palestine & food
- Safia Elhillo (b. 1990, Sudan/United States), poet
- Anilú Elías (b. 1937, Mexico), scholar & activist
- María Luisa Elío (1926–2009, Spain/Mexico), screenwriter
- George Eliot (Marian Evans, 1819–1880, England), nv. & poet; Middlemarch
- Elisabeth of Wied (1843–1916, Romania), Queen Consort & poet
- Caroline Elkins (b. 1969, United States), prof. & non-f. wr.
- Elizabeth F. Ellet (1818–1877, United States), wr. & poet
- Anne Elliot (1856–1941, England), nv.
- Lady Charlotte Elliot (1839–1880, Scotland), poet
- E. S. Elliott (1836–1897, England), poet, hymn wr., nv., ed.
- Janice Elliott (1931–1995, England), fiction & ch. wr.
- Marianne Elliott (living, Ireland/England), historian
- Alice Thomas Ellis (Anna Haycraft, 1932–3005, England), fiction & non-f. wr.
- Ellen Elizabeth Ellis (1829–1895, England/New Zealand), nv. & activist
- Keisha Lynne Ellis (fl. 2009 onward, Bahamas), political scientist
- Lucy Ellmann (b. 1956, United States/Scotland), nv.
- Dorothee Elmiger (b. 1985, Switzerland), nv. & es.
- Barbara Else (b. 1947, New Zealand), fiction & ch. wr. & pw.
- Gisela Elsner (1939–1992, Germany), nv.
- Elizabeth Elstob (1683–1756, England), feminist & translator
- Diamela Eltit (b. 1949, Chile), wr. & academic
- Lynn Emanuel (b. 1949, United States), poet
- Buchi Emecheta (1944–2017, Nigeria), nv.
- Claudia Emerson (1957–2014, United States), poet & academic
- Ellen Russell Emerson (1837–1907, United States), wr. & ethnologist
- Akwaeke Emezi (b. 1987, Nigeria), fiction wr.
- Lelia Dromgold Emig (1872–1957, United States), genealogist & non-f. wr.
- Carol Emshwiller (1921–2019, United States), fiction wr.
- Angella Emurwon (living, Uganda), pw.

=== En–Ez ===
- Amanda Enayati (living, Iran/Persia/United States), health wr.
- Fumiko Enchi (円地文子, 1905–1986, Japan), pw. & fiction wr.
- María Dolores Pérez Enciso (1908–1949, Spain/Mexico), social wr.
- Alberthiene Endah (living, Indonesia), biographer & nv.
- Chuah Guat Eng (蔡月英, b. 1943, Malaysia), fiction wr. in English
- Marian Engel (1933–1985, Canada/Newfoundland), nv.
- Dorothe Engelbretsdatter (1634–1716, Norway), poet & hymn wr.
- Helene von Engelhardt (1850–1910, Germany), poet, wr. & linguist
- Edith Mary England (1899–1979/1981, Australia), nv. & poet
- Isobel English (1920–1994, England), nv.
- Françoise Enguehard (b. 1957, Canada/Newfoundland), prose wr. in French
- Enheduanna (2285–2250 BC, Ancient Sumeria), poet & royal priestess
- Maki Enjōji (円城寺マキ, living, Japan), manga creator
- Nariko Enomoto (榎本ナリコ, b. 1967, Japan), manga creator
- Anna Enquist (b. 1945, Netherlands), poet & nv.
- Anne Enright (b. 1962, Ireland), fiction writer
- Kalilah Enríquez (b. 1983, Belize/Jamaica), col. & poet
- Mariana Enríquez (b. 1973, Algeria), fiction wr. & col.
- Anne Enright (b. 1962, Ireland), fiction wr. & es.
- José Ensch (1942–2008, Luxembourg), poet
- Riemke Ensing (b. 1939, Netherlands/New Zealand), poet & academic
- Camelia Entekhabifard (b. 1973, Iran/Persia/United States), wr.
- Fotini Epanomitis (b. 1969, Australia), nv.
- Nora Ephron (1941–2012, United States), nv. & screenwriter
- Pamphile of Epidaurus (1st century AD, Ancient Greece), historian
- Muzi Epifani (1935–1984, Italy), nv., poet & pw.
- Helen Epstein (b. 1947, Czechoslovakia/Czech Republic/United States), biographer & mem.
- Noura Erakat (b. 1980, United States), wr. on Palestine
- Ruth Erat (b. 1951, Switzerland), fiction wr. in German
- Leyla Erbil (1931–2013, Turkey/Ottoman Empire), wr.
- Aslı Erdoğan (b. 1967, Turkey/Ottoman Empire), wr. and activist
- Louise Erdrich (b. 1954, United States), nv., poet & ch. wr.
- Rica Erickson (1908–2009, Australia), botany & history wr.
- Helena Eriksson (b. 1962, Sweden), poet
- Erinna (Ἤριννα, fl. c. 600 BC, Ancient Greece), poet
- Anastasia Eristavi-Khoshtaria (1868–1951, Georgia (Caucasus)), nv.
- Dominika Eristavi (1864–1929, Georgia (Caucasus)), poet & prose wr.
- Annie Ernaux (b. 1940, France), nv. & autobiographer
- Maria Ernestam (b. 1959, Sweden), fiction wr.
- Annette Mbaye d'Erneville (b. 1926, Senegal), poet & ch. wr.
- Henrica van Erp (c. 1480–1548, Netherlands), chronicler & abbess
- Jenny Erpenbeck (b. 1967, Germany), fiction wr. and pw.
- María de los Ángeles Errisúriz (b. 1966, Mexico), wr. on education
- Kelcey Ervick (fl. 2013, USA), wr., creative writing
- Tina Escaja (b. 1965, Spain/United States), poet, fiction wr. & pw.
- Ximena Escalante (b. 1964, Mexico), pw.
- Alicia Escardó (b. 1963, Uruguay), fiction wr. & educator
- Nataly von Eschstruth (1860–1939, Germany), fiction wr. and pw.
- Edith Escombe (1866–1950, England), fiction wr. & es.
- Gloria Escomel (b. 1941, Uruguay/Canada/Newfoundland), fiction wr.
- Margaret Escott (1908–1977, New Zealand), nv., poet & educator
- Rosemary Esehagu (b. 1981, Nigeria/United States), nv.
- Rosario María Gutiérrez Eskildsen (1899–1979, Mexico), linguist & poet
- Catharine H. Esling (1812–1897, United States), poet, wr., hymn wr.
- Erminda Rentoul Esler (c. 1852–1924, Ireland), fiction wr.
- Florbela Espanca (1894–1930, Portugal), poet
- Rhoda A. Esmond (1819-1894, United States), wr.
- Teresa Espasa (living, Spain), poet, es. & professor
- Kristin Espinasse (b. 1968, United States), wr.
- Ileana Espinel (1933–2001, Ecuador), poet & wr.
- Ramabai Espinet (b. 1948, Trinidad), poet, nv. & critic
- Laura Esquivel (b. 1950, Mexico), nv.
- Sofia Ester (b. 1978, Portugal), YA wr.
- Elsa d'Esterre-Keeling (1857–1935, Ireland), nv. & educator
- Eleanor Estes (1906–1988, United States), ch. wr.
- Clarissa Pinkola Estés (b. 1945, United States), poet
- Gisèle d'Estoc (1845–1894, France), non-f. wr.
- Jenny Estrada (b. 1940, Ecuador), social wr.
- Ana Estrella Santos (b. 20th-c, Ecuador), non-f. wr., ss. wr.
- Makiko Esumi (江角マキコ, b. 1966, Japan), non-f. wr. & lyricist
- Eloísa García Etchegoyhen (1921–1996, Uruguay), education wr.
- Claire Etcherelli (b. 1934, France), nv.
- Gabriela Etcheverry (b. 1946, Chile/Canada/Newfoundland), wr. & critic
- Parvin E'tesami (1907–1941, Iran/Persia), poet
- Mansoureh Ettehadieh (living, Iran/Persia), historian
- Lucía Etxebarría (b. 1966, Spain), biographer & nv.
- Luisa Etxenike (b. 1957, Spain), fiction wr., pw. & poet
- Cecilia Eudave (b. 1968, Mexico), fiction wr.
- Aelia Eudocia (c. 401–460, Byzantium), religious wr. in Greek
- Damiana Eugenio (1921–2014, Philippines), wr. & academic
- Eun Mihee (은미희, b. 1960, Korea), nv., col. & academic
- Jang Eun-jin (장은진, b. 1976, Korea), wr.
- Lolita Euson (1914–1994, Sint Eustatius), poet
- Janet Evanovich (b. 1943, United States), nv.
- Anne Evans (1820–1870, England), poet & composer
- Augusta Jane Evans (1835–1909, United States), nv.
- Christine Evans (b. 1943, Wales), poet
- Diana Evans (b. c. 1971, England), nv., col. & critic
- Mari Evans (1923–2017, United States), poet, pw. & ch. wr.
- Matilda Jane Evans (1827–1886, Australia), nv.
- Lizzie P. Evans-Hansell (1836–1922, United States), fiction wr.
- Bernardine Evaristo (b. 1959, England), wr.
- Conceição Evaristo (b. 1946, Brazil), social wr.
- Marjorie Evasco (b. 1953, Philippines), poet
- Maria Louise Eve (1842–1900, United States), poet
- Elizabeth Hawley Everett (1857–1940, United States), editor, wr
- Zdravka Evtimova (b. 1959, Bulgaria), fiction wr.
- Barbara Ewing (b. 1939, New Zealand/England), nv., actor & pw.
- Emma Pike Ewing (1838–1917, United States), wr. & educator
- Eve Ewing (b. 1986, United States), wr., poet & artist
- Juliana Horatia Ewing (1841–1885, England), ch. wr.
- Catherine Exley (1779–1857, England), non-f. wr.
- Elisabeth Eybers (1915–2007, South Africa), poet in Afrikaans
- Leonora Eyles (1889–1960, England), feminist wr. & nv.
- Regīna Ezera (1930–2002, Latvia), nv.

== F ==
=== Fa–Fl ===
- Camilla Faà (c. 1599–1662, Italy), autobiographer & nun
- Edda Fabbri (b. 1949, Uruguay), fiction wr.
- Anne Faber (living, Luxembourg/England), cookery wr.
- Michèle Fabien (1945–1999, Belgium), wr. & pw. in French
- Mary Fabilli (1914–2011, United States), poet & illustrator
- Kinga Fabó (1953–2021, Hungary), poet & es.
- Paloma Fabrykant (b. 1981, Argentina), non-f. wr. & artist
- Diane Fahey (b. 1945, Australia), poet
- Jacqueline Fahey (b. 1929, New Zealand), mem. & painter
- Diamante Medaglia Faini (1724–1770, Italy), poet & composer
- Elizabeth Fair (1908–1997, England), nv.
- Zoë Fairbairns (b. 1948, England), feminist wr., nv., short stories
- Lidia Falcón (b. 1935, Spain), pw. & es.
- Suzanne Falkiner (b. 1952, Australia), nv. & non-f. wr.
- Aminata Sow Fall (b. 1941, Senegal), nv.
- Khadi Fall (b. 1948, Senegal), nv.
- Kiné Kirama Fall (b. 1934, Senegal), poet
- Oriana Fallaci (1929–2006, Italy), non-f. wr.
- Amber Fallon (b. 1993, United States), horror wr.
- Katie Fallon (b. 1976, United States), es. & non-f. wr.
- Fan Xiaoqing (范小青, b. 1955, China), fiction wr.
- Elena Fanailova (b. 1962, Soviet Union/Russia), poet
- Fang Fang (方方, b. 1955, China), poet & nv.
- Clara Elizabeth Fanning (1878–1938, United States), non-f. wr.
- Diane Fanning (b. 1950, United States), wr. on crime & nv.
- Teresa González de Fanning (1836–1918, Peru), nv. & col.
- Ann, Lady Fanshawe (1625–1680, England), mem.
- Catherine Maria Fanshawe (1765–1834, England), poet
- Ursula Fanthorpe (1929–2009, England), poet
- Elena Farago (1878–1954, Romania), poet & ch. wr.
- Najwa Kawar Farah (1923–2015, Palestine/Canada/Newfoundland), fiction & ch. wr. & autobiographer
- Marthe Fare (b. 1985, Togo), nv. & educator
- Rosa Lobato de Faria (1932–2010, Portugal), nv., poet & actor
- Lily Yulianti Farid (b. 1971, Indonesia), fiction wr.
- Beverley Farmer (1941–2018, Australia), fiction wr.
- Hannah Tobey Farmer (1823–1891, United States), wr. & poet
- Nancy Farmer (b. 1941, United States), YA & ch. nv.
- Penelope Farmer (b. 1939, England), ch. nv.; Charlotte Sometimes
- Fadhila El Farouk (b. 1967, Algeria/Lebanon), nv.
- Fiona Farrell (b. 1947, New Zealand), poet, fiction wr. & pw.
- Forough Farrokhzad (1935–1967, Iran/Persia), poet & film director
- Pooran Farrokhzad (1933–2016, Iran/Persia), poet, pw. & encyclopedist
- Angie Farrow (b. 1951, England/New Zealand), academic & wr. for theater & radio
- Bushra Farrukh (b. 1957, Pakistan), poet
- Leila Farsakh (b. 1967, Palestine/United States), political economist
- Lilian Faschinger (b. 1950, Austria/Austria-Hungary), fiction wr. & poet
- Malika al-Fassi (1919–2007, Morocco), pw. & fiction wr.
- Adélaïde Fassinou (b. 1955, Benin), fiction wr.
- Nazila Fathi (b. 1970, Iran/Persia/Canada/Newfoundland), political mem.
- Altaf Fatima (1927–2018, India/Pakistan), fiction wr.
- Geneviève Fauconnier (1886–1969, France), nv.
- Margaretta Faugères (1771–1801, United States), poet
- Gertrude Minnie Faulding (1875–1961, England), nv. & ch. wr.
- Jesse Redmon Fauset (1882–1961, United States), poet, es. & nv.
- Beatrice Faust (1939–2019, Australia), non-f. wr. & activist
- Eliza Fay (1755 or 1756–1816, England/India), correspondent
- Madame de La Fayette (1634–1693, France), nv.
- Samira Fazal (living, Pakistan), screenwriter & pw.
- Carmen Febres-Cordero de Ballén (1829–1893, Ecuador), wr. & poet
- Astrid Stampe Feddersen (1852–1930, Denmark), wr. & activist
- Etta Federn (1883–1951, Austria/Austria-Hungary), wr. & translator
- Elaine Feeney (living, Ireland), nv. & pw.
- Klára Fehér (1919–1996, Hungary), nv. & ch. wr.
- Leslie Feinberg (1949–2014, United States), wr. & activist
- Elaine Feinstein (1930–2019, England), poet, nv. & translator
- Else Feldmann (1884–1942, Austria/Austria-Hungary), pw., poet & nv.
- Stéphanie Félicité, comtesse de Genlis (1746–1830, France), nv., pw. & ch. wr.
- Mary Fels (1863–1953, Germany/United States), wr. & ed.
- Zuo Fen (左芬, c. 255–300, China), poet
- Feng Yuanjun (冯沅君, 1900–1974, China), wr. & scholar
- Edna Ferber (1885–1968, United States), nv. & pw.
- Kate Lee Ferguson (1841–1928, United States), nv., poet & composer
- Nathalie Ferlut (b. 1968, France), comic book wr., artist
- Fanny Fern (1811–1872, United States), fiction & ch. wr.
- María Luisa Fernández (1870–1938, Chile), feminist wr. & poet
- Marian Lopez Fernandez-Cao (b. 1964, Spain), art wr. & academic
- Roberta Fernández (living, United States), nv., scholar & critic
- Chitra Fernando (1935–1998, Sri Lanka), ch. wr. & academic
- Vera Ferra-Mikura (1923–1997, Austria/Austria-Hungary), ch. wr.
- Elena Ferrante (b. 1943, Italy), nv.
- María del Carme Ribé i Ferré (1920–1991, Spain), nv. & autobiographer
- Rosario Ferré (1938–2016, United States), nv., poet & biographer
- Maria Eugenia Vaz Ferreira (1875–1924, Uruguay), poet & educator
- Julia Ferrer (1925–1995, Peru), poet & wr.
- Susan Edmonstoune Ferrier (1782–1854, Scotland), nv.
- Diana Ferrus (1953–2026, South Africa), poet & wr. in Afrikaans & English
- Laura Dayton Fessenden (1852–1924, United States), wr.
- Maria Fetherstonhaugh (1847–1918, England), nv.
- Tina Fey (b. 1970, United States), screenwriter & autobiographer
- Vera Feyder (b. 1949, Belgium/France), poet & nv.
- Ilia Fibiger (1817–1867, Denmark), pw. & fiction wr.
- Mathilde Fibiger (1830–1872, Denmark), wr. on women's rights
- Dorothea de Ficquelmont (1804–1863, Russia/Austria/Austria-Hungary), diarist in French
- Mrs. E. M. Field (1856–1940, Ireland), nv. & literary critic
- Michael Field, the pseudonym of Katharine Bradley (1846–1914, England), and Edith Cooper (1862–1913, England), poets, pw.
- Rachel Field (1894–1942, United States), nv., poet & ch. wr.
- Helen Fielding (b. 1958, England), nv.
- Sarah Fielding (1710–1768, England), nv.
- Jennie Fields (b. 1953, United States), nv.
- Celia Fiennes (1662–1741, England), travel wr.
- Fanny Carrión de Fierro (b. 1936, Ecuador), poet, critic & academic
- Eva Figes (1932–2012, Germany/England), nv., critic & feminist
- N. P. Figgis (1939–2014, Ireland/Wales), archaeologist
- Sia Figiel (b. 1967, Serbia), poet & nv.
- Vera Figner (1852–1942, Russia/Soviet Union), mem. & political biographer
- Trini de Figueroa (1918–1972, Spain), romance nv.
- Margita Figuli (1909–1995, Czechoslovakia/Czech Republic/Slovakia), social & ch. wr.
- Amanda Filipacchi (b. 1957, France/United States), nv.
- Lyudmila Filipova (b. 1977, Bulgaria), nv. & col.
- Zlata Filipović (b. 1980, Bosnia-Herzegovina/Ireland), child war diarist
- Adelaide Filleul, Marquise de Souza-Botelho (1761–1836, France), nv.
- Clara Filleul (1822–1878, France), ch. wr. & painter
- Anne Finch (1661–1720, England), poet
- Annie Finch (b. 1956, United States), poet, translator & critic
- Anne Fine (b. 1947, England), wr.
- Manuela Fingueret (1945–2013, Argentina), poet, nv. & es.
- Ida Fink (1921–2011, Poland/Israel), Hc. wr.
- Nikky Finney (b. 1957, United States), poet
- Steinunn Finnsdóttir (c. 1640 – c. 1710, Iceland), poet
- Carmen Firan (b. 1958, Romania/United States), poet, fiction wr. & pw.
- Caroline Auguste Fischer (1764–1842, Germany), wr. & rights activist
- Margery Fish (1892–1969, England), gardening wr.
- Ann Fisher (1719–1778, England), grammarian
- Carrie Fisher (1956–2016, United States), nv., actor & screenwriter
- Catherine Fisher (b. 1957, Wales), wr. & broadcaster
- Elizabeth Fisher (journalist) (1924–1982), US editor of the magazine Aphra
- Lala Fisher (1872–1929, Australia), poet & editor
- M. F. K. Fisher (1908–1992, United States), food wr.
- Wirydianna Fiszerowa (1761–1826, Poland), mem.
- Anna M. Fitch (1840–1904, United States), nv., poet, playwr.
- Fitnat Hanım (died 1780, Turkey/Ottoman Empire), poet
- Sarah Mary Fitton (c. 1796–1874, Ireland), wr. & botanist
- Barbara Fitzgerald (1911–1982, Ireland/England), nv.
- Kitty Fitzgerald (b. 1946, Ireland/England), nv., poet & pw.
- Mary Anne Fitzgerald (living, South Africa/England), political wr.
- Penelope Fitzgerald (1916–2000, England), nv., poet & biographer
- Theodora FitzGibbon (1916–1991, Ireland), cookery wr.
- Louise Fitzhugh (1928–1974, United States), ch. wr. & illustrator
- Becca Fitzpatrick (b. 1979, United States), nv.
- Kathleen Fitzpatrick (1905–1990), historian, biographer & critic
- Marie-Louise Fitzpatrick (b. 1962, Ireland), ch. wr. & illustrator
- Ellen Fitzsimon (1805–1883, Ireland), poet
- Fannie Flagg (b. 1944, United States), screenwriter & nv.
- Jane Flanders (1940–2001, United States), poet
- Marieluise Fleißer (1901–1974, Germany), pw.
- Marjorie Fleming (1803–1811, Scotland), child diarist & poet
- Kate Fleron (1909–2006, Denmark), wr. & resistance fighter
- Beryl Fletcher (1938–2018, New Zealand), nv.
- Jane Ada Fletcher (1870–1956, Australia), nature & ch. wr.
- Lisa Anne Fletcher (1844–1905, United States), poet, correspondent
- Mary Bosanquet Fletcher (1739–1850, England), religious wr.
- Penelope Fletcher (b. 1988, England), YA & fantasy wr.
- Zénaïde Fleuriot (1829–1890, France), nv.
- Pierrette Fleutiaux (1941–2019, France), fiction wr.
- Lynn Flewelling (b. 1958, United States), nv.
- Lina Flor (1914–1976, Philippines), fiction & scriptwriter
- Debbi Michiko Florence (b. 1964/1965), ch. wr.
- Leona Florentino (1849–1884, Philippines), poet
- Malva Flores (b. 1961, Mexico), poet, fiction wr. & es.
- Paulina Flores (b. 1988, Chile), fiction wr.
- Nísia Floresta (1810–1885, Brazil/France), poet & feminist
- Angela Flournoy (living, United States), nv.
- Pat Flower (1914–1977, Australia), stage & TV pw. & nv.
- Tui Flower (1925–2017, New Zealand), food wr.
- Emilie Flygare-Carlén (1807–1892, Sw.), nv.
- Carol Houlihan Flynn (b. 1945, United States), academic, critic & fiction wr.
- Elizabeth Gurley Flynn (1890–1964, United States), political wr. & activist
- Gillian Flynn (b. 1971, United States), nv. & screenwriter

=== Fo–Fu ===
- Marnie Fogg (living, England), fashion wr.
- Éva Földes (1914–1981, Hungary), wr. & Hc. survivor
- Jolán Földes (1902–1963, Hungary), nv.
- Mária Földes (1925–1976, Romania), pw. in Hungarian and Hc. survivor
- Sara Rowsey Foley (1840-1925, United States), biographer
- Winifred Foley (1914–2009, England), autobiographer
- Mary Alice Fonda (1837–1897, United States), musician, linguist, wr., critic
- Maria Assumpció Soler i Font (1913–2004, Spain), wr. & col. in Catalan
- Brigitte Fontaine (b. 1939, France), wr. & singer
- Moderata Fonte (1555–1592, Italy), feminist & poet; The Worth of Women
- Pascale Fonteneau (b. 1963, France/Belgium), nv. & wr. in French
- Philippa Foot (1920–2010, England), philosopher
- Mary Hallock Foote (1847–1938, United States), nv.
- Mary Hannay Foott (1846–1918, Australia), poet & editor
- Alaíde Foppa (1914 – c. 1980, Spain), poet
- Curdella Forbes (living, Jamaica), science fiction wr.
- Frances Forbes-Robertson (1866–1956, United Kingdom), nv.
- Esther Forbes (1891–1967, United States), nv. & ch. wr.
- Charlotte-Rose de Caumont de La Force (1654–1724, France), nv. & poet
- Margot Forde (1935–1992, New Zealand), botanist & taxonomist
- Patricia Forde (b. c. 1960, Ireland), ch. wr.
- Honor Ford-Smith (b. 1951, Canada/Newfoundland), pw., scholar & poet
- Eva Forest (1928–2007, Spain), wr.
- Meta Forkel-Liebeskind (1765–1853, Germany), academic
- Aminatta Forna (b. 1964, Scotland), wr.
- María Irene Fornés (1930–2018, Cuba/United States), pw.
- Francesca Forrellad (1927–2013, Spain), wr. in Catalan
- Lluïsa Forrellad (1927–2018, Spain), nv. & pw. in Spanish & Catalan
- Anne Marie Forrest (living, Ireland), nv.
- Mabel Forrest (1872–1935, Australia), nv. & poet
- Veronica Forrest-Thomson (1947–1975, Scotland), poet & critic
- Ellen Forrester (1823–1883, Ireland), poet
- Viviane Forrester (1825–1913, France), es., nv. & critic
- Olga Forsh (1873–1961, Russia/Soviet Union), novelist, pw. & mem.
- Thelma Forshaw (1923–1995, Australia), fiction wr. & reviewer
- Tua Forsström (b. 1947, Finland), poet in Swedish
- Margaret Forster (1938–2016, England), nv. & biographer
- Mary Forster (c. 1620–1687, England), Quaker polemicist
- Michelanne Forster (b. 1953, New Zealand), pw. & scriptwriter
- Jessie Forsyth (1847/49 – 1937, England/United States/Australia), temperance advocate
- Gertrud von Le Fort (1876–1971, Germany), nv., poet & es.
- Laudomia Forteguerri (1515–1555, Italy), poet
- Susana Fortes (b. 1959, Spain), nv. & col.
- Elena Fortún (1886–1952, Spain), ch. wr.
- Dion Fortune (Violet Mary Firth, 1890–1946, Wales), nv. & wr.
- Mary Fortune (c. 1833–1911, Australia), crime wr.
- E. M. Foster (fl. late 18th – early 19th centuries, England), nv.
- Hannah Webster Foster (1758–1840, United States), nv.
- Lydia Mary Foster (1867–1943, Ireland), social writer & poet
- Lynn Foster (1914–1985, Australia), pw. & nv.
- Corlia Fourie (b. 1944, South Africa), fiction & ch. wr. in Afrikaans
- Carolina Amor de Fournier (1908–1993, Mexico), biographer & medical wr.
- Dorothy Fowler (living, New Zealand), nv.
- Harriet Putnam Fowler (1842–1901, United States), wr., poet
- Karen Joy Fowler (b. 1950, United States), fiction wr.
- Aileen Fox (1907–2005, England), archaeologist
- Mamita Fox (b. 1943, Curaçao), autobiographer
- Biancamaria Frabotta (1946–2022, Italy), poet & critic
- Esther G. Frame (1840–1920, United States), autobiographer
- Janet Frame (1924–2004, New Zealand), fiction & YA wr. & autobiographer
- Isabel Franc (b. 1955, Spain), fiction wr. & es.
- Marie de France (fl. 12th century, France), poet in Anglo-Norman
- Ruth France (1913–1968, New Zealand), poet & nv.
- Annie Francé-Harrar (1886–1971, Austria/Austria-Hungary), wr. & scientist
- Lorraine Francis (b. 1958, Ireland), ch. wr.
- Louise E. Francis (1869–1932, United States), wr., ed., pub.
- M. E. Francis (1859–1930, Ireland/England), nv.
- Suzanne Francis (b. 1959, England), fantasy wr.
- Julia Franck (b. 1970, Germany), fiction wr. and es.
- Veronica Franco (1546–1591, Italy), poet
- Jocelyne François (b. 1933, France), nv.
- Louise von François (1817–1893, Germany), nv.
- Justine Frangouli-Argyris (b. 1959, Greece), fiction wr. & biographer
- Anne Frank (Anna, 1929–1945, Netherlands), diarist & Hc. victim; The Diary of a Young Girl
- Lone Frank (b. 1966, Denmark), science wr.
- Miles Franklin (1879–1954, Australia), feminist wr.
- Abby Franquemont (b. 1972, United States), wr.
- Rebecca Fransway (b. 1953, United States), wr. & poet
- Agnes Franz (1794–1843, German), writer
- Marie-Louise von Franz (1915–1998, Germany/Switzerland), psychologist
- Antonia Fraser (b. 1932, England), nv. & biographer
- Bashabi Fraser (b. 1954, India), non-f. and ch. wr., poet, and translator
- Pauline Fréchette (1889–1943, Canada), poet, dr., jour.; nun
- Kirstine Frederiksen (1845–1903, Denmark), educationist & activist
- Marianne Fredriksson (1927–2007, Sweden), nv.
- Lynn Freed (living, South Africa), fiction wr. & es. in English
- Gillian Freeman (1929–2019, England), nv. & pw.
- Mary Eleanor Wilkins Freeman (1852–1930, United States), fiction wr.
- Celia de Fréine (b. 1948, Ireland), poet, pw. & librettist
- Espido Freire (b. 1974, Spain), nv.
- Raquel Freire (b. 1973, Paraguay), screenwriter, nv. & film director
- Anna Freixas (b. 1946, Spain), wr. & academic
- Laura Freixas (b. 1958, Spain), fiction wr. & col.
- Elizabeth Wynne Fremantle (1778–1857, England), diarist
- Anne French (b. 1956, New Zealand), poet
- Dawn French (b. 1957, Wales/England), wr. & comedian
- Katy French (1983–2007, Ireland), writer & model
- Lucy Virginia French (1825–1881, United States), wr.
- Marilyn French (1929–2009, United States), feminist wr. & academic
- Tana French (b. 1973, United States/Ireland), nv. & actor
- Mariana Frenk-Westheim (1898–2004, Mexico), poet & Hispanist
- Maud Frère (1923–1979, Belgium), fiction & ch. wr. in French
- Patricia Fresen (b. 1940, South Africa), religious wr. in English
- Yvonne du Fresne (1929–2011, New Zealand), fiction wr. & radio pw.
- Anna Freud (1895–1982, Austria/England), psychoanalyst
- Milagros Frías (b. 1955, Spain), nv. & critic
- Maikki Friberg (1861–1927, Finland), educator & peace activist
- Betty Friedan (1921–2006, United States), wr., activist & feminist
- Violeta Friedman (1930–2000, Russia/Spain), wr. & Hc. survivor
- Inger Frimansson (b. 1944, Sweden), poet & fiction & ch. wr.
- Barbara Frischmuth (1941–2025, Austria), nv., ch. & pw.
- Marianne Fritz (1948–2007, Austria), nv.
- Anne Froelick (1913–2010, United States), screenwriter & nv.
- Francisca Praguer Fróes (1872–1931, Brazil), health wr. & activist
- Gayleen Froese (b. 1972, Canada/Newfoundland), nv. & songwriter
- Eva Margareta Frölich (1650–1692, Sweden), wr.
- Elena Frolova (b. 1969, Latvia/Russia), songwriter & poet
- Bella Fromm (1890–1972, Germany/United States), wartime journalist
- Katarina Frostenson (b. 1953, Sweden), poet
- Ruth Frow (1922–2008, England), wr. & historian
- Linda Frum (b. 1963, Canada/Newfoundland), wr. & politician
- Joan Mary Fry (1862–1955, England), Quaker social wr.
- Susanna M. D. Fry (1841–1920, United States), wr.
- Agnes Moore Fryberger (1868–1939, United States), music wr.
- Camilla Frydan (1887–1949, Austria/Austria-Hungary), lyricist & musician
- Fu Shanxiang (傅善祥, 1833–1864, China), scholar
- Fu Tianlin (傅天琳, b. 1946, China), poet
- Gloria Fuertes (1917–1998, Spain), poet & ch. wr.
- Lisa Fugard (living, South Africa/United States), fiction wr. & actor
- Sheila Meiring Fugard (b. 1932, England/South Africa), fiction wr. & pw.
- Mihona Fujii (藤井みほな, b. 1974, Japan), manga creator
- Kaori Fujino (藤野可織, b. 1980, Japan), fiction wr.
- Kazuko Fujita (藤田和子, b. 1957, Japan), manga creator
- Cocoa Fujiwara (藤原ここあ, 1983–2015, Japan), manga creator
- Hiro Fujiwara (藤原ヒロ, b. 1981, Japan), manga creator
- Yvonne K. Fulbright (living, Iceland/United States), sexologist
- Anne Fuller (died 1790, Ireland), nv.
- Janice Moore Fuller (b. 1951, United States), poet & pw.
- Claire Fuller (b. 1967, England), nv.
- Alexandra Fuller (b. 1969, Zimbabwe/United States), mem. & nv.
- Margaret Fuller (1810–1850, United States), feminist
- Mary Eliza Fullerton (1868–1946, Australia), feminist poet, fiction wr. & col.
- Alice Fulton (b. 1952, United States), wr. & poet
- Catherine Fulton (1829–1919, England/New Zealand), diarist & philanthropist
- Cornelia Funke (b. 1958, Germany), ch. wr.
- Bilkisu Funtuwa (living, Nigeria), nv.
- Huarui Furen (花蕊夫人, 940–976, China), poet
- Alice Furlong (1866–1946, Ireland), story wr. & poet
- Eva Furnari (b. 1948, Italy/Brazil), ch. wr. & illustrator
- Füruzan (b. 1932, Turkey/Ottoman Empire), fiction & non-f. wr.
- Felícia Fuster (1921–2012, Spain), poet in Catalan & painter
- Luisa Futoransky (b. 1939, Argentina), poet, nv. & academic

== G ==
=== Ga–Gl ===
- Diana Gabaldon (b. 1952, United States), fiction wr.
- Patrícia Gabancho (1952–2017, Argentina/Spain), wr. in Catalan
- Anneli Ute Gabanyi (b. 1942, Romania/Germany), critic & philologist
- Ekaterine Gabashvili (1851–1938, Georgia (Caucasus)), nv. & feminist
- Dora Gabe (1888–1983, Bulgaria), poet & travel wr.
- Cherubina de Gabriak (1887–1928, Russia/Soviet Union), poet
- Belén Gache (b. 1960, Argentina/Spain), nv. & electronic wr.
- Emma Gad (1852–1921, Denmark), wr. & pw.
- Gertrude Gaffney (?–1959, Ireland), col.
- Maureen Gaffney (b. 1947, Ireland), psychologist
- Frances Dana Barker Gage (1808–1884, United States), wr. & poet
- Nina Gagen-Torn (1900–1986, Russia/Soviet Union), poet & ethnographer
- Eva Roe Gaggin (1879–1966, United States), ch. wr.
- Marie-Louise Gagneur (1832–1902, France), fiction wr., es. & activist
- Madeleine Gagnon (1938–2026, Canada), poet, es. & critic
- Jeannine Hall Gailey (b. 1973, United States), poet & critic
- Abby Gaines (living, New Zealand), nv.
- Sigri Mitra Gaïni (b. 1975, Faroe Islands), poet & educator
- Carmen Martín Gaite (1925–2000, Spain), fiction wr., es. & screenwriter
- Mary Gaitskill (b. 1954, United States), es. & fiction wr.
- Nora Gal (1912–1991, Russia/Soviet Union), critic & translation theorist
- Ana Galán (b. 1964, Spain/United States), ch. wr. & humorist
- Rhea Galanaki (b. 1947, Greece), fiction wr., es. & poet
- Georgie Starbuck Galbraith (1909–1980, United States), poet
- Rosa Galcerán (1917–2015, Spain), poet & cartoonist
- Ona Galdikaitė (1898–1990, Lithuania/Germany), poet & nun
- Kate Gale (b. 1965, United States), poet & librettist
- Zona Gale (1874–1938, United States), nv. & pw.
- Azucena Galettini (b. 1981, Argentina), wr.
- Erzsébet Galgóczi (1930–1989, Hungary), fiction wr. & pw.
- Adela Galiana (1825 – late 19th/early 20th century, Spain), wr.
- Beatriz Galindo (c. 1465–1534, Sp.), Latinist & educator
- Hermila Galindo (1886–1954, Mexico), political wr.
- María Galindo (b. 1964, Bolivia), psychologist
- Katherine Gallagher (b. 1935, Argentina), poet
- Kathleen Gallagher (b. 1957, New Zealand), pw., poet & nv.
- Margaret Gallagher (living, Ireland/England), gender researcher
- Miriam Gallagher (b. 1940, Ireland), pw.
- Rhian Gallagher (b. 1961, New Zealand), poet
- Tess Gallagher (b. 1943, United States), poet, nv. & pw.
- Fatima Gallaire (1944–2020, Algeria/France), pw. & fiction wr.
- Mavis Gallant (1922–2014, Canada/Newfoundland), fiction wr., pw. & es. in French
- Sara Gallardo (1931–1988, Argentina), fiction wr.
- Menna Gallie (1919–1990, Wales), nv. & translator
- Karina Galvez (b. 1964, Ecuador), poet
- María Rosa de Gálvez (1768–1806, Spain), poet & pw.
- Jeanne Galzy (1883–1977, France), nv. & biographer
- Joana da Gama (c. 1520–1586, Portugal), nun & wr. on aphorisms
- Veronica Gambara (1485–1550, Italy), poet & politician
- Griselda Gambaro (b. 1928, Argentina), fiction wr., pw. & es.
- Anna Rosina Gambold (1762–1821, United States), missionary & diarist
- Mary Ninde Gamewell (1858–1947, United States), missionary & wr.
- Gangadevi (fl. 14th century, India), poet & princess
- Alisa Ganieva (b. 1985, Russia), fiction wr. & es.
- Petina Gappah (b. 1971, Zimbabwe), fiction wr.
- Anne-Marie Garat (b. 1946, France), nv.
- Nicole Garay (1873–1928, Panama), poet
- Carolina Garcia-Aguilera (b. 1949, Cuba/United States), fiction wr. in English
- Cristina García (b. 1958, Cuba/United States), nv.
- R. S. A. Garcia (living, Trinidad), science fiction wr.
- María Esther García López (b. 1948, Spain), poet, wr.
- Jane Gardam (1928–2025, England), fiction & ch. wr.
- Delphine Gardey (b. 1967, France), non-f. wr.
- Marguerite Gardiner, Countess of Blessington (1789–1849, Ireland), nv. & col.
- Elizabeth Gard'ner (1858–1926, Sweden/New Zealand), domestic science wr.
- Malwina Garfeinowa-Garska (1870–1932, Poland), nv. & es.
- Viera Gašparíková (1928–2023, Slovakia), folklorist & wr.
- Mridula Garg (b. 1938, India), fiction wr. & es.
- Francesca Gargallo (1956–2022, Italy/Mexico), poet & nv.
- Mariam Garikhuli (1883–1960, Georgia (Caucasus)/Soviet Union), nv. & ch. wr.
- Doris Pilkington Garimara (1937–2014, Australia), nv.
- Tatiana Garmash-Roffe (b. 1959, Soviet Union/Russia), nv.
- Helen Garner (b. 1942, Australia), nv. & col.
- Constance Garnett (1861–1946, England), translator
- Anne F. Garréta (b. 1962, France), nv.
- Carlota Garrido de la Peña (1870–1958, Argentina), journalist, wr.
- Fanny Garrido (1846–1917, Spain), nv. & col.
- Francisca Herrera Garrido (1869–1950, Spain), poet & nv. in Galician
- Marissa Garrido (1926–2021, Mexico), telenovela pw. & wr.
- Harriet E. Garrison (1848–1930, United States), medical wr.
- Elena Garro (c. 1916–1998, Mexico), screenwriter & fiction wr.
- Dorothy Garrod (1892–1968, England), archaeologist
- Amy Jacques Garvey (1895–1973, Jamaica), journalist & activist
- María Luisa Garza (1887–1980, Mexico), nv.
- Caroline Leigh Gascoigne (1813–1883, England), poet & nv.
- Elizabeth Gaskell (1810–1865, England), nv.; Cranford
- Whitney Gaskell (b. 1972, United States), nv.
- Catherine Gaskin (1929–2009, Australia), nv.
- Valérie de Gasparin (1813–1894, Switzerland), social wr. in French
- Brunella Gasperini (1918–1979, Italy), nv.
- Nathalie Gassel (b. 1964, Belgium), feminist wr.
- Leopolda Gassó y Vidal (1849–1885, Spain), feminist Spanish wr.
- Carmen Bernos de Gasztold (1919–1995, France), poet & nun
- Liudmila Gatagova (living, Soviet Union/Russia), historian & es.
- Zélia Gattai (1916–2008, Brazil), nv. & ch. wr.
- Margaret Gatty (1809–1873, England), ch. wr. & biologist
- Delores Gauntlett (b. 1949, Jamaica), poet
- Judith Gautier (1845–1917, France), poet & nv.
- Anna Gavalda (b. 1970, France), nv.
- Jamila Gavin (b. 1941, India/England), fiction & ch. wr.
- Roxane Gay (b. 1974, United States), wr., ed. & social commentator
- Sophie Gay (1776–1852, France), nv. & librettist
- Alessia Gazzola (b. 1982, Italy), nv.
- Béatrice Lalinon Gbado (living, Benin), ch. wr.
- Ivone Gebara (b. 1944, Brazil), philosopher & nun
- Miriam Gebhardt (b. 1962, Germany), historian
- Pauline Gedge (b. 1945, Canada/Newfoundland), nv.
- Vera Gedroits (1870–1932, Russia/Soviet Union), medical wr.
- Maggie Gee (b. 1948, England), nv.
- Angela Gegg (b. 1979, Belize), wr. & artist
- Luisa Geisler (b. 1991, Brazil), fiction wr.
- Heike Geißler (b. 1977, Germany), nv. & es.
- Naira Gelashvili (b. 1947, Georgia (Caucasus)), nv. & activist
- Edith Mary Gell (1860–1944, England), wr. & activist
- Martha Gellhorn (1908–1998, United States), nv, travel wr. & journalist
- Charley Genever (living, England), poet
- Stéphanie Félicité, comtesse de Genlis (1746–1830, France), nv. & education theorist
- Empress Genmei (元明天皇, 660–721, Japan), monarch & poet
- Louise Boije af Gennäs (b. 1971, Sweden), nv.
- Catherine of Genoa (St Catherine, 1447–1510, Italy), wr. & mystic
- Doris Gentile (1894–1972, Australia), fiction wr.
- Sulari Gentill (living, Australia), fiction wr.
- Elizabeth George (b. 1949, United States), mystery nv.
- Ella M. George (1850–1938, United States), non-f. wr. & newspaper editor
- Frances Shayle George (1828–1890, England/New Zealand), poet, es. & educator
- Margaret George (b. 1943, United States), nv.
- Nina George (b. 1973, Germany), wr.
- Danielle Legros Georges (~1965–2025, Haiti/United States), poet, es. & academic
- Antonine de Gérando (1844-1914, France, Hungary), translator, non-f. wr.
- Rosemonde Gérard (1871–1953, France), poet & pw.
- Doris Gercke (1937–2025, Germany), nv.
- Ágnes Gergely (b. 1933, Hungary), poet & nv.
- Ida Gerhardt (1905–1997, Netherlands), classicist & poet
- Sylvie Germain (b. 1954, France), nv. & es.
- Teolinda Gersão (b. 1940, Portugal), fiction wr.
- Marina Gershenovich (b. 1960, Russia/Germany), poet
- Karen Gershon (1923–1993, Germany/England), poet & fiction & non-f. wr.
- Elfriede Gerstl (1932–2009, Austria/Austria-Hungary), poet, fiction wr. & es.
- Amy Gerstler (b. 1956, United States), poet
- María Elena Gertner (1932–2013, Chile), poet, nv. & screenwriter
- Gertrude the Great (1256 – c. 1302, Germany), saint & mystic in Latin
- Masha Gessen (b. 1967, Soviet Union/United States), political wr.
- Ragnheiður Gestsdóttir (b. 1953, Iceland), ch. wr.
- Geum Hee (금희, b. 1979, Korea), wr.
- Yi Geun-hwa (이근화, b. 1976, Korea), poet
- Marie Gevers (1893–1975, Belgium), nv. in French
- Amélie Gex (1835–1883, France), poet & wr. also in Provençal
- Zarah Ghahramani (b. 1981, Iran/Persia/Australia), mem.
- Randa Ghazy (b. 1987, Egypt/Italy), wr.
- Salima Ghezali (b. 1958, Algeria), wr. & activist
- Sagarika Ghose (b. 1964, India), col. & nv.
- Maureen Gibbon (living, United States), fiction wr.
- June & Jennifer Gibbons (b. 1963, Jennifer died 1993, Wales), fiction wr.
- Kaye Gibbons (b. 1960, United States), nv.
- Stella Gibbons (1902–1989, England), nv. & short story wr.
- Angelica Gibbs (1908–1955, United States), fiction wr. & col.
- Eleanor Churchill Gibbs (1840–1925, United States), fiction & non-f. wr.
- Ivy Gibbs (c. 1886–1966, Australia/New Zealand), poet & ch. wr.
- May Gibbs (1877–1969, Australia), ch. wr. & illustrator
- Doris Gibson (1910–2008, Peru), political wr.
- Suzanne Giese (1946–2012, Denmark), wr. & rights activist
- Robyn Gigl (b. 1952/1953, United States), thriller wr. & lawyer
- Eve Gil (b. 1968, Mexico), fiction wr. & poet
- Ruth Gilbert (1917–2016, New Zealand), poet
- Elizabeth Gilbert (b. 1969, United States), fiction & non-f. wr.
- Annie Somers Gilchrist (1841–1912, United States), fiction, non-f. wr. & poet
- Ellen Gilchrist (1935–2024, United States), fiction wr. & poet
- Betty Gilderdale (1923–2021, New Zealand), ch. wr.
- Annabel Giles (b. 1959, Wales), nv. & broadcaster
- Olivia Aroha Giles (living, New Zealand), ch. & fiction wr.
- María Esther Gilio (1922–2011, Uruguay), biographer & col.
- Elizabeth Gilligan (1962–2017, United States), nv.
- Ruth Gilligan (b. 1988, Ireland), nv. & academic
- Charlotte Perkins Gilman (1860–1935, United States), sociologist & poet
- Florence Magruder Gilmore (1881–1945), religious wr., nv., translator
- Mary Gilmore (1865–1962, Australia), poet & col.
- Beryl Gilroy (1924–2001, Guyana), nv.
- Marija Gimbutas (1921–1994, Lithuania/United States), archaeologist & anthropologist
- Concepción Gimeno de Flaquer (1850–1919, Spain), nv., ss. wr., non-f. wr.
- Ruby Langford Ginibi (1934–2001, Australia), historian & non-f. wr.
- Zuzanna Ginczanka (1917–1945, Poland), poet & Hc. victim
- Lidiya Ginzburg (1902–1990, Russia/Soviet Union), critic & historian
- Natalia Ginzburg (1916–1991, Italy), fiction & social wr.
- Yevgenia Ginzburg (1904–1977, Russia/Soviet Union), mem. & political prisoner
- Cinzia Giorgio (b. 1975, Italy), nv. & academic
- Marosa di Giorgio (1932–2004, Uruguay), poet & nv.
- Nikki Giovanni (1943–2024, United States), poet, wr. & activist
- Zinaida Gippius (1869–1945, Russia/Soviet Union), poet, pw. & nv.
- Delphine de Girardin (1804–1855, France), es., nv. & pw.
- Banira Giri (1946–2021, Nepal), poet & wr.
- Lady Blanche Girouard (1898–1940, Ireland/England), fiction wr.
- Hallgerður Gísladóttir (1952–2007, Iceland), ethnologist & poet
- Þórdís Gísladóttir (b. 1965, Iceland), ch. wr., poet & nv.
- Moraa Gitaa (living, Kenya), fiction & non-f. wr.
- Anca Giurchescu (1930–2015, Romania), researcher
- Stanka Gjurić (b. 1956, Yu/Canada/Newfoundland), poet & es.
- Asiimwe Deborah GKashugi (living, Uganda), pw. & performer
- Evi Gkotzaridis (living, Greece), historian
- Diane Glancy (b. 1941, United States), poet, nv. & pw.
- Margo Glantz (b. 1930, Mexico), fiction wr., autobiographer & es.
- Henny Glarbo (1884–1955, Denmark), archivist
- Ellen Glasgow (1873–1945, United States), nv.
- Maude Glasgow (1876–1955, Ireland/United States), preventive medicine wr.
- Susan Glaspell (1876–1948, United States), nv. & pw.
- Julia Glass (b. 1956, United States), nv.
- Madeline Gleason (1903–1979, United States), poet & pw.
- Esther Glen (1881–1940, New Zealand), ch. wr., nv. & activist
- Mar Gómez Glez (b. 1977, Spain), pw. & nv.
- Patricia Glinton-Meicholas (b. 1950, Bahamas), wr., critic & educator
- Barbara Gloudon (1935–2022, Jamaica), journalist, pw.
- Louise Glück (1943–2023, United States), poet
- Glückel of Hameln (c. 1646–1724), diarist in Yiddish

=== Gm–Gy ===
- Anna Gmeyner (1902–1991, Austria/Austria-Hungary/England), nv. & scriptwriter in German & English
- Christine Adjahi Gnimagnon (b. 1945, Benin), wr.
- Elisabetta Gnone (b. 1965, Italy), ch. wr.
- Charlotte Godley (1821–1907, Wales/New Zealand), correspondent
- Gail Godwin (b. 1937, United States), fiction & non-f. wr. & librettist
- Helga Goetze (1922–2008, Germany), wr., poet and painter
- Germaine Goetzinger (b. 1947, Luxembourg), historian, linguist & educator
- Katerina Gogou (1940–1993, Greece), poet, wr. & actor
- Jyoti Gogte (born 1956, India), non-f.
- Christiane Gohl (b. 1958, Germany), ch. wr.
- Namita Gokhale (b. 1956, India), fiction & non-f. wr.
- Hawa Jande Golakai (b. 1979, Liberia), wr. & scientist
- Nora Gold (b. 1952, Canada), nv.
- Kaarina Goldberg (b. 1956, Finland/Austria/Austria-Hungary), ch. wr. & col.
- Natalie Goldberg (b. 1948, United States), non-f. wr.
- Goldie Goldbloom (b. 1964, Australia), fiction wr.
- Marita Golden (b. 1950, United States), nv. & non-f. wr.
- Kate De Goldi (b. 1959, New Zealand), ch. & fiction wr.
- Amy Goldin (1926–1978, United States), art critic
- Emma Goldman (1869–1940, Lithuania/United States), anarchist
- Júlia Goldman (b. 1974, Hungary), genre nv. & mathematician
- Anna Goldsworthy (b. 1974, Australia), wr., teacher & pianist
- Nilüfer Göle (b. 1953, Turkey/Ottoman Empire/France), academic
- Padma Gole (1913–1998, India), poet
- Alenka Goljevšček (1933–2017, Yugoslavia/Slovenia), mythologist & pw.
- Claire Goll (1890–1977, Germany), poet & nv. in German & French
- Berta Golob (b. 1932, Yugoslavia/Slovenia), fiction & non-f. wr. & poet
- Anne Golon (1921–2017, France/Canada/Newfoundland), nv.
- Estela Golovchenko (b. 1963, Uruguay), pw. & actor
- Luísa Costa Gomes (b. 1954, Portugal), librettist, nv. & pw.
- Jewelle Gomez (b. 1948, United States), poet, critic & pw.
- Lupe Gómez (b. 1972, Spain), wr. in Galician
- Petronila Angélica Gómez (1883–1971, Dominica), feminist wr.
- Eloísa Gómez-Lucena (living, Spain), non-f. wr.
- Gong Ji-young (공지영, b. 1963, Korea), nv.
- Gong Sun-ok (공선옥, b. 1963, Korea), fiction & non-f. wr.
- Ana Maria Gonçalves (b. 1970, Brazil), nv.
- Olga Gonçalves (1929–2004, Portugal), poet & nv.
- Sophie Gonzales (b. 1993, Argentina), YA wr.
- Aida González (b. 1962, Panama), fiction wr. & physician
- Ana Marta González (b. 1969, Spain), non-f. wr.
- Aurelia Castillo de González (1842–1920, Cuba), prose wr. & poet
- Betina Gonzalez (b. 1972, Argentina), fiction wr.
- Clotilde González de Fernández (1880–1935, Argentina), non-f. wr. & educator
- Maria Lluïsa Borràs i Gonzàlez (1931–2010, Spain), art wr.
- Dulce María González (1958–2015, Mexico), fiction wr., poet & academic
- Maria Teresa Maia Gonzalez (b. 1958, Portugal), ch. & YA wr.
- Enriqueta González Rubín (1832–1877, Spain), novelist in Asturian
- Lorna Goodison (b. 1947, Jamaica), poet & fiction wr.
- Allegra Goodman (b. 1967, United States), fiction wr.
- Lavinia Stella Goodwin (1833–1911, United States), wr. & educator
- Jeanne Goosen (1938–2020, South Africa), poet & fiction & ch. wr. in Afrikaans
- Belén Gopegui (b. 1963, Spain), nv.
- Natalya Gorbanevskaya (1936–2013, Soviet Union/France), poet & activist
- Viviana Gorbato (1950–2005, Argentina), wr. & academic
- Nadine Gordimer (1923–2014, South Africa), nv. & pw.; 1991 Nobel Prize in Literature
- Alice Mary Gordon (c. 1855–1929, England), wr.
- Caroline Gordon (1895–1981, United States), nv. & critic
- Jaimy Gordon (b. 1944, United States), nv.
- Lyndall Gordon (b. 1941, South Africa/England), biographer
- Mary Gordon (b. 1949, United States), fiction & non-f. wr.
- Sheila Gordon (1927–2013, South Africa/United States), fiction wr.
- Catherine Gore (1799–1861, England), nv. & pw.
- Eva Gore-Booth (1870–1926, Ireland/England), poet, pw. & activist
- Alisz Goriupp (1894–1979, Russia/Hungary), media historian & librarian
- Nina Gorlanova (b. 1947, Soviet Union/Russia), fiction wr.
- Amanda Gorman (b. 1998, United States), poet
- Wangui wa Goro (b. (1961, Kenya/England), poet, fiction & non-f. wr. & academic
- Angélica Gorodischer (1928–2022, Argentina), fiction wr.
- Juana Manuela Gorriti (1818–1892, Argentina/Peru), fiction wr. & politician
- Hedwig Gorski (b. 1949, United States), poet & artist
- Marthe Gosteli (1917–2017, Switzerland), feminist wr. in German
- Anastasia Gosteva (b. 1975, Soviet Union/Russia), nv. & poet
- Mamoni Raisom Goswami (1942–2011, India), poet & scholar
- Hiromi Goto (b. 1966, Canada/Newfoundland), nv.
- Mélanie Gouby (living, France/England), wr., col. & filmmaker
- Elizabeth Goudge (1900–1984, England), fiction & ch. wr.
- Olympe de Gouges (1748–1793, France), feminist & pw.
- Sophie el Goulli (1932–2015, Tunisia), poet & ch. wr.
- Neelum Saran Gour (b. 1955, India), fiction & non-f. wr.
- Emilie Gourd (1879–1946, Switzerland), political wr. in French
- Candy Gourlay (living, Philippines/England), nv. & ch. wr. in English
- Marie de Gournay (1565–1645, France), wr. & nv.
- Pregs Govender (b. 1960, South Africa), social wr. & col. in English
- Katherine Govier (b. 1948, Canada/Newfoundland), fiction wr. & es.
- Santhini Govindan (b. 1959, India), ch. wr.
- Barbara Gowdy (b. 1950, Canada/Newfoundland), fiction wr.
- Iris Gower (1935–2010, Wales), nv.
- Kodagina Gowramma (1912–1939, India), wr.
- María Goyri (1873–1955, Spain), critic & academic
- Hermine de Graaf (1951–2013, Netherlands), nv.
- Maria Grabher-Meyer (1898–1970, Liechtenstein) poet & short story wr.
- Patricia Grace (b. 1937, New Zealand), fiction & ch. wr.
- Annie Ryder Gracey (1836–1908, United States), wr.
- Posie Graeme-Evans (b. 1952, England/Australia), nv. & screenwriter
- Emma Graf (1865–1926, Switzerland), non-f. wr.
- Agnieszka Graff (b. 1970, Poland), feminist wr. & es.
- Françoise de Graffigny (1695–1758, France), nv. & pw.
- Sue Grafton (1940–2017, United States), nv.
- Clementina Stirling Graham (1782–1877, Scotland), wr., translator
- Jorie Graham (b. 1950, United States), poet & academic
- Lauren Graham (b. 1967, United States), nv. & actor
- Virginia Graham (1910–1993, England), poet & humorist
- Winifred Graham (1873–1950, England), nv.
- Natalie Grams (b. 1978, Germany), medical wr.
- María Josefa García Granados (1796–1848, Guatemala), writer & poet
- Reyna Grande (b. 1975, Mexico/United States), nv. & mem. in English
- Almudena Grandes (b. 1960, Spain), nv.
- Évelyne Grandjean (b. 1939, France), pw., screenwriter & actor
- Lucie Grange (1839–1908, France), ed.
- Linda Grant (b. 1951, England), nv. & wr.
- Sybil Grant (1879–1955, England), wr. & artist
- Lesley Grant-Adamson (b. 1942, England), mystery fiction wr.
- Olga Grau (b. 1945, Chile), wr.
- Shirley Ann Grau (1929–2020, United States), fiction wr.
- Wilhelmina Gravallius (1807–1884, Sweden), nv.
- Elsa Grave (1918–2003, Sweden), nv., poet & artist
- Clotilde Graves (1863–1932, Ireland/England), pw. & nv.
- Lucia Graves (b. 1943, England), wr. & translator
- Caroline Gravière (Michel Fleury, 1821–1878, Belgium), nv. & wr. in French
- Charlotte E. Gray (1873–1926, US), nv. & religion
- Dulcie Gray (1915–2011, Malaysia/England), wr. & actor
- Elizabeth Caroline Gray (1800–1887, Scotland), archaeologist & travel wr.
- Mary Tenney Gray (1833–1904, United States), col.
- Maxwell Gray (1846–1923, England), nv. & poet
- Marie Eugenie Delle Grazie (1864–1931, Austria/Austria-Hungary), poet, pw. & nv.
- Áine Greaney (b. c. 1962, Ireland/United States), wr.
- Alice Stopford Green (1847–1929, Ireland), historian & nationalist
- Anna Katharine Green (1846–1935, United States), nv.
- Charmaine Papertalk Green (1962–2025, Australia), poet & artist
- Eliza S. Craven Green (1803–1866, Isle of Man), poet
- Miriam Green (b. c. 1950, South Africa/England), academic
- Paula Green, (b. 1955, New Zealand), poet & ch. wr.
- Rosario Green (1941–2017, Mexico), economist & politician
- Sarah Green (fl. 1790–1825, Ireland/England), nv.
- Bette Greene (1934–2020, United States), ch. & YA wr.
- Cordelia A. Greene (1831–1905, United States), non-f. wr.
- Frances Nimmo Greene (1867–1937, United States), nv, pw. & wr.
- Louisa Lilias Plunket Greene (1833–1891, Ireland), ch. wr.
- Jessie Greengrass (b. 1982, England), fiction wr.
- Lavinia Greenlaw (b. 1962, England), poet & nv.
- Bonnie Greer (1948–2026, England/United States), pw., nv. & critic
- Debora Greger (b. 1949, United States), poet & visual artist
- Linda Gregg (1942–2019, United States), poet
- Simonetta Greggio (b. 1961, Italy), nv. in French
- Alyse Gregory (1884–1967, United States/England), suffragist & wr.
- Doris Gregory (1921–2023, Canada/Newfoundland), wr.
- Augusta, Lady Gregory (1852–1932, Ireland), folklorist & pw.
- Catharina Regina von Greiffenberg (1633–1694, Austria/Austria-Hungary), poet
- Beatrice Greig (1869 – c. 1940s, Canada/Newfoundland/Trinidad), wr. & activist
- Virginie Greiner (b. 1969), French comic book scriptwriter
- Anna Gréki (1931–1966, Algeria), poet, politician & educator
- Kate Grenville (b. 1950, Australia), nv. & academic
- Elsa Gress (1919–1988, Denmark), es., nv. & pw.
- Manuela Gretkowska (b. 1964, Poland), screenwriter & politician
- Frances Greville (c. 1724–1789, Ireland/England), poet
- Henry Gréville (1842–1902, Russia/France), nv.
- Constantia Grierson (c. 1705–1732, Ireland), poet & scholar
- Sarah Maria Griffin (b. c. 1988), wr. & poet
- Elizabeth Griffith (c. 1727–1793, Ireland), pw., fiction wr. & es.
- Ann Griffiths (1776–1805, Wales), poet & hymnist
- Josephine Van De Grift (1894–1927, United States), wr., col. & pw.
- Delia Grigore (b. 1972, Romania), Romani rights activist
- Lydia Grigorieva (b. 1945, Ukraine/England), poet & filmmaker
- Tatiana P. Grigorieva (1929–2014, Russia), es. & Japan expert
- Martha Grimes (b. 1931, United States), mystery nv.
- Angelina Weld Grimke (1880–1958, United States), col. & poet
- Charlotte Forten Grimké (1837–1914, United States), anti-slavery activist & poet
- Vigdís Grímsdóttir (b. 1953, Iceland), poet, fiction & ch. wr.
- Beatrice Grimshaw (1870–1953, Ireland), travel wr.
- Charlotte Grimshaw (b. 1968, New Zealand), nv. & col.
- Isabella Grinevskaya (1864–1944, Russia/Soviet Union), nv., poet & pw.
- Katherine Van Allen Grinnell (1839–1917, United States), wr., lecturer, reformer
- Margareta Grip (1538–1586, Sweden), genealogist
- Maria Gripe (1923–2007, Sweden), ch. & YA wr.
- Eliza Griswold (b. 1973, United States), col. & poet
- Hattie Tyng Griswold (1842–1909, United States), wr., poet
- Tatiana Gritsi-Milliex (1920–2005, Greece), nv. & col.
- Vona Groarke (b. 1964, Ireland/United States), poet & educator
- Anne-Lise Grobéty (1949–2010, Switzerland), fiction wr., poet & col. in French
- Katarzyna Grochola (b. 1957, Poland), fiction wr. & pw.
- Alma De Groen (b. 1941, New Zealand/Australia), pw.
- Els de Groen (b. 1949, Netherlands), fiction & non-f. wr.
- Lauren Groff (b. 1978, United States), fiction wr.
- Paula Grogger (1892–1984, Austria/Austria-Hungary), wr.
- Alyona Gromnitskaya (b. 1975, Ukraine), poet & politician
- Edith Searle Grossmann (1863–1931, Australia/New Zealand), nv. & educator
- Benoîte Groult (1920–2016, France), wr. & activist
- Henriette Grové (1922–2009, South Africa), fiction wr. & pw. in Afrikaans
- Teji Grover (living, India), poet, fiction wr. & painter
- Isabel Grubb (1881–1972, Ireland), Quaker historian
- Anna Grue (b. 1957, Denmark), crime wr.
- Sara Gruen (b. 1969, Canada/Newfoundland/United States), nv.
- Kim Gruenenfelder (living, United States), nv.
- Argula von Grumbach (1492 – c. 1555, Germany), religious wr. and poet
- Bertha Jane Grundy (1837–1912, England), nv., poet & non-f. wr.
- Olga Grushin (b. 1971, Soviet Union/United States), nv. in English
- Wioletta Grzegorzewska (b. 1974, Poland), poet & fiction wr.
- Gu Taiqing (顾太清, 799 – c. 1877, China), poet
- Guan Daosheng (字仲姬, 1262–1319, China), poet, calligrapher & painter
- Gloria Guardia (1940–2019, Panama), fiction wr. & critic
- Carla Guelfenbein (b. 1959, Chile), nv.
- Rosa Guerra (1834–1864, Argentina), educator, journalist, wr.
- María José Guerra Palmero (b. 1962, Spain), philosopher, non-f. wr., & feminist theorist
- Wendy Guerra (b. 1970, Cuba), poet & nv.
- Claudine Guérin de Tencin (1682–1749, France), nv. & patron
- Soumaya Naamane Guessous (living, Morocco), sociologist & col.
- Judith Guest (b. 1936, United States), nv. & screenwriter
- Amalia Guglielminetti (1881–1941, Italy), poet & ch. wr.
- Margherita Guidacci (1921–1992, Italy), poet & linguist
- Laura Guidiccioni] (1550–c. 1597/9, Italy), poet
- Beatriz Guido (1924–1988, Argentina), nv. & screenwriter
- Pernette Du Guillet (c. 1520–1545, France), poet
- Regina Guimarães (b. 1957, Portugal), poet & pw.
- Ruth Guimarães (1920–2014, Brazil), fiction wr. & poet
- Ursula K. Le Guin (1929–2018, United States), science fiction & ch. wr. & poet
- Evelyn May Guinid (b. 1971, Philippines), nv. in Tagalog
- Olga Guirao (b. 1956, Spain), nv.
- Guji, Princess of Joseon (현주이구지, died 1489, Korea), wr., poet & dancer
- Zumrud Gulu-zade (1932–2021, Azerbaijan), philosopher
- Nataliya Gumenyuk (b. 1983, Ukraine), journalist, & wr.
- Karoline von Günderrode (1780–1806, Germany), poet
- Eileen Gunn (b. 1945, United States), fiction wr. & editor
- Elizabeth Gunn (1927–2022, United States), nv.
- Kirsty Gunn (b. 1960, New Zealand), fiction wr.
- Elín Ebba Gunnarsdóttir (b. 1953, Iceland), fiction wr.
- Kristín Helga Gunnarsdóttir (b. 1963, Iceland), ch. wr. & nv.
- Monica Gunning (b. 1930, Jamaica/United States), ch. wr. & poet
- Susannah Gunning (c. 1740–1800, England), nv.
- Álfrún Gunnlaugsdóttir (b. 1938, Iceland), nv.
- Shusha Guppy (1935–2008, Iran/Persia/England), wr. & singer
- Tanika Gupta (b. 1963, England), pw. & screenwriter
- Aysel Gürel (1929–2008, Turkey/Ottoman Empire), lyricist
- Elena Guro (1877–1913, Russia), futurist wr.
- Alice Gurschner (1869–1944, Austria/Austria-Hungary), nv., pw. & poet
- Madeleine Gustafsson (b. 1937, Sweden), poet, es. & critic
- Aldona Gustas (1932–2022, Lithuania/Germany), poet & illustrator
- Rósa Guðmundsdóttir (1795–1855, Iceland), poet
- Carmela Gutiérrez de Gambra (1921–1984, Spain), romance nv.
- Goya Gutiérrez (b. 1954, Spain), poet & wr.
- Rita Cetina Gutiérrez (1846–1908, Mexico), poet & educator
- Azmiye Hami Güven (1904–1954, Turkey/Ottoman Empire), nv.
- Rosa Guy (1922–2012, Trinidad/United States), fiction & YA wr.
- Emma Jane Guyton (1825–1887, England), nv. & editor
- Eulalia Guzmán (1890–1985, Mexico), archaeologist & educator
- Maria Odulio de Guzman (fl. 20th century), wr. & educator
- Viviana Guzmán (b. 1964, Chile), poet & musician
- Yaa Gyasi (b. 1989, Ghana/Gold Coast/United States), nv.
- Jeon Gyeong-rin (전경린, b. 1962, Korea), nv.
- Althea Gyles (1867–1949, Ireland), poet & artist
- Thomasine Christine Gyllembourg-Ehrensvärd (1773–1856, Denmark), fiction wr.
- Minrose Gwin (b. 1945, United States), poet, fiction and non-fiction wr.
- Beth Gylys (b. 1964, United States), poet & academic

== H ==
=== Ha–He ===
- H.D. (Hilda Doolittle) (1886–1961, United States), poet, nv. & mem.
- Ha Seong-nan (하성란, b. 1967, Korea), fiction wr.
- Meredith Haaf (b. 1983, Germany), wr.
- Francisca de Haan (living, Netherlands), social scientist
- Hilja Haapala (1877–1958, Finland), wr.
- Helen Fields (b. 1969, British crime wr.
- Hella Haasse (1918–2011, Netherlands), nv.
- Anna Haava (1864–1957, Estonia), poet & fiction & non-f. wr.
- Huzama Habayeb (b. 1965, Palestine/Emirates), fiction wr. & poet
- Maria Hack (1777–1844, England), ch. wr.
- Marilyn Hacker (b. 1942, United States), poet, translator & critic
- Yanna Hadatty (b. 1969, Ecuador/Mexico), fiction wr. & es.
- Joumana Haddad (b. 1970, Lebanon), poet & es.
- Tessa Hadley (b. 1956, England), nv. & non-f. wr.
- Mimi Hafida (b. 1965, Algeria), poet & artist
- Jessica Hagedorn (b. 1949, Philippines/United States), poet, pw. & nv.
- Lucie Caroline Hager (1853–1903, United States), wr. & poet
- Mandy Hager (b. 1960, New Zealand), fiction, non-f., YA and ch. wr.
- Moto Hagio (萩尾望都, b. 1949, Japan), manga creator
- Lucina Hagman (1853–1946, Finland), feminist & politician
- Michitsuna no Haha (道綱, c. 935–995, Japan), diarist
- Ida, Countess von Hahn-Hahn (1805–1880, Germany), nv., poet and social wr.
- Sarah Rogers Haight (1808–1881, United States), traveler and writer
- Elizabeth Forsythe Hailey (b. 1938, United States), nv. & pw.
- Seo Hajin (서하진, b. 1960, Korea), wr.
- Roya Hakakian (b. 1966, Iran/Persia), poet & wr.
- Helinä Häkkänen-Nyholm (b. 1971, Finland), psychologist & textbook wr.
- Baby Halder (b. 1973, India), autobiographer
- Lucretia Peabody Hale (1820–1900, United States), fiction wr. & col.
- Gisèle Halimi (1927–2020, Fr/Tunisia), es.
- Lady Anne Halkett (1623–1699, England), mem. & es.
- Anna Maria Hall (1800–1881, Ireland), nv.
- Bernadette Hall (b. 1945, New Zealand), pw. & poet
- Megan Hall (b. 1972, South Africa), poet in English
- Pip Hall (b. 1971, New Zealand), scriptwriter & actor
- Radclyffe Hall (1880–1943, England), nv. & poet
- Sarah Hall (b. 1974, England), nv. & poet
- Guðný Halldórsdóttir (b. 1954, Iceland), screenwriter
- Jean Halley (b. 1967, United States), sociologist
- Marion Rose Halpenny (living, England), equestrian
- Ada L. Halstead (1861–1901, United States), nv.
- Rosalie Ham (b. 1955, Australia), nv. & pw.
- Helvi Hämäläinen (1907–1998, Finland), fiction wr. & poet
- Joan Hambidge (b. 1956, South Africa), poet & academic in Afrikaans
- Barbara Hambly (b. 1951, United States), nv. & screenwriter
- Yasmeen Hameed (b. 1951, Pakistan), poet & educator
- Virpi Hämeen-Anttila (b. 1958, Finland), nv. & non-f. wr.
- Joan de Hamel (1924–2011, England/New Zealand), ch. wr.
- Zaib-un-Nissa Hamidullah (1918–2000, India/Pakistan), poet, fiction & travel wr.
- C. J. Hamilton (1841–1935, England/Ireland), pw., poet & ch. wr.
- Jane Eaton Hamilton (b. 1954, Canada/Newfoundland), fiction wr. & poet
- Jane Hamilton (b. 1957, United States), nv.
- Marianne-Caroline Hamilton (1777–1861, Ireland), mem. & artist
- Virginia Hamilton (1936–2002, United States), ch. nv.
- Anna Hamilton Geete (1848–1913), Swedish translator and biographer
- Suheir Hammad (b. 1973, Palestine/United States), poet, pw. & activist
- Beatrice Hammer (b. 1963, France), fiction & ch. wr.
- Marie Hammer (1907–2002, Denmark), zoologist & entomologist
- Irène Hamoir (1906–1994, Belgium), nv. & poet in French
- Janie Hampton (b. 1952, England), non-f. wr. & journalist
- Susan Hampton (b. 1949, Australia), poet
- Han Kang (한강, b. 1970, Korea), fiction wr.
- Han Malsook (한말숙, b. 1931, Korea), fiction wr.
- Han Moo-sook (한무숙, 1918–1993, Korea), nv.
- Amira Hanafi (b. 1979), American/Egyptian poet and artist active in electronic literature
- Nahema Hanafi (b. 1983, France), historian & non-f. wr.
- Judith Hand (b. 1940, United States), nv., es. & screenwriter
- Nathalie Handal (b. 1969, Haiti/United States), poet & pw.
- Enrica von Handel-Mazzetti (1871–1955, Austria/Austria-Hungary), poet & nv.
- Elizabeth Hands (1746–1815, England), poet
- Khady Hane (b. 1962, Senegal/France), nv.
- Helene Hanff (1916–1997, United States), wr. & screenwriter; 84, Charing Cross Road
- Hani Motoko (羽仁もと子, 1873–1957, Japan), col. & autobiographer
- Lynsey Hanley (b. 1976, England), wr. & academic
- Kristin Hannah (b. 1960, United States), nv.
- Sophie Hannah (b. 1971, England), poet & nv.
- Emma Hannigan (1972–2018, Ireland), wr.
- Anne Hänninen (b. 1958, Finland), poet & es.
- Barbara Hanrahan (1939–1991, Australia), nv. & artist
- Lorraine Hansberry (1930–1965, United States), pw.
- Bente Hansen (1940–2022, Denmark), wr. & activist
- Anita Hansemann (1962–2019, Switzerland), fiction & social wr. in German
- Carola Hansson (b. 1942, Sweden), nv. & pw.
- Bergtóra Hanusardóttir (b. 1946, Faroe Islands), fiction wr.
- Hao Jingfang (郝景芳, b. 1984, China), science fiction nv.
- Volha Hapeyeva (b. 1982, Belarus), poet & linguist
- Maha Harada (原田マハ, b. 1962, Japan), nv.
- Anwara Syed Haq (b. 1940, India/Bangladesh), fiction & ch. wr.
- Ingibjörg Haraldsdóttir (1942–2016, Iceland), poet
- Nino Haratischwili (b. 1983, Georgia (Caucasus)), nv. & pw.
- Elizabeth Boynton Harbert (1843–1925, United States), wr.
- Thea von Harbou (1888–1954, Germany), nv. & screenwriter
- Kerry Hardie (b. 1951, Singapore/Northern Ireland), poet & nv.
- Ratih Hardjono (b. 1960, Indonesia), socio-political wr.
- Elizabeth Hardy (1794–1854, Ireland/England), nv.
- Stacy Hardy (living, South Africa), fiction wr. & col. in English
- Maud Cuney Hare (1874–1936, United States), wr. & pianist
- Lesbia Harford (1891–1927, Australia), poet, nv. & activist
- Githa Hariharan (b. 1954, India), nv.
- Joy Harjo (b. 1951, United States), poet
- Anna-Leena Härkönen (b. 1965, Finland), nv., stage & TV wr.
- Saima Harmaja (1913–1937, Finland), poet & diarist
- Aljean Harmetz (b. 1928, United States), non-f. writer and journalist
- Beverley Harper (1943–2002, Australia), nv.
- Frances Harper (1825–1911, United States), poet & nv.
- Jacqueline Harpman (1929–2012, Belgium), wr. in French
- Alice Harriman (1861–1925, United States), poet
- Ada Van Stone Harris (1866-1923, United States), wr.
- Amanda Bartlett Harris (1824–1917, United States), wr. & critic
- Dorothy Joan Harris (b. 1931, Japan/Canada/Newfoundland), ch. wr.
- Emily Marion Harris (1844–1900, England), nv. & poet
- Ethel Hillyer Harris (1859–1931, United States), wr.
- Jane Elizabeth Harris (c. 1853–1942, England/New Zealand), wr. & spiritualist
- Joanne Harris (b. 1964, England), nv.
- M. G. Harris (b. 1966, Mexico/England), ch. wr.
- Nancy Harris (living, Ireland/England), pw. & screenwriter
- Jennifer Harrison (b. 1955, Australia), poet
- Juanita Harrison (1887–1967, United States), autobiographer
- Sarah Harrison (b. 1946, England), nv. & ch. wr.
- Elizabeth Harrower (1928–2020, Australia), fiction wr.
- Carla Harryman (b. 1952, United States), poet, es. & pw.
- Anne Le Marquand Hartigan (living, Ireland), poet, pw. & painter
- Milka Hartman (1902–1997, Yugoslavia/Slovenia), poet
- Petra Hartmann (b. 1970, Germany), nv. & ch. wr.
- Nanae Haruno (榛野なな恵, J, manga creator
- Elisabeth Harvor (b. 1936, Canada/Newfoundland), nv. & poet
- Gwen Harwood (1920–1995, Australia), poet & librettist
- Johanna Harwood (b. 1930, Ireland/England), screenwriter
- Nigar Hasan-Zadeh (living, Azerbaijan), poet & philologist
- Iulia Hasdeu (1869–1888, Romania/France), poet
- Machiko Hasegawa (長谷川町子, 1920–1992, Japan), manga creator
- Hasegawa Shigure (長谷川時雨, 1879–1941, Japan), pw. & editor
- Dilara Hashem (1936–2022, India/Bangladesh), nv.
- Sugako Hashida (橋田 壽賀子, 1925–2021, Japan), scriptwriter
- Khadijah Hashim (b. 1942, Malaysia), fiction & ch. wr. & poet
- Molly Haskell (b. 1939, United States), film critic & non-f. author
- Eveline Hasler (b. 1933, Switzerland), fiction & ch. wr.
- Shahida Hassan (b. 1953, Bangladesh/Pakistan), poet
- Margaret Hasse (b. 1950, United States), poet & wr.
- Satu Hassi (b. 1951, Finland), textbook wr. & politician
- Pirjo Hassinen (b. 1957, Finland), nv.
- Kirsten Hastrup (b. 1948, Denmark), anthropologist
- Isoko Hatano (波多野勤子, 1905–1978, Japan), writer & psychologist
- Mary R. P. Hatch (1848–1935, United States), poet, fiction wr.
- Chandrakala A. Hate (1903–1990, India), social wr.
- Ana Hatherly (1929–2015, Portugal), academic & poet
- Libby Hathorn (b. 1943, Australia), poet, librettist & ch. wr.
- Bisco Hatori (葉鳥ビスコ, b. 1975), manga creator
- Miyuki Hatoyama (鳩山幸, b. 1943, Japan), cookery wr. & actor
- Ann Hatton (1764–1838, England), nv. & poet
- Mihri Hatun (c.1460–1506, Turkey/Ottoman Empire), poet
- Mireille Havet (1898–1932, France), poet, diarist & nv.
- Anne Haverty (b. 1959, Ireland), nv. & poet
- Bettina Hauge (b. 1964, Denmark), anthropologist
- Mila Haugová (b. 1942, Czechoslovakia/Czech Republic/Slovakia), poet
- Jiřina Hauková (1919–2005, Czechoslovakia/Czech Republic), poet & translator
- Marie-Louise Haumont (1919–2012, Belgium), nv. in French
- Eva Hauserová (1954–2023, Czechoslovakia/Czech Republic), science fiction & non-f. wr.
- Marlen Haushofer (1920–1970, Austria/Austria-Hungary), fiction & ch. wr.
- Esther Hautzig (1930–2009, Poland/United States), mem. & ch. wr.
- Kathleen Hawkins (1883–1981, Sri Lanka/New Zealand), poet
- Paula Hawkins (b. 1972, Zimbabwe/England), wr.
- Susan Hawthorne (b. 1951), fiction & non-f. wr. & poet
- Catherine Hay (1910–1995, New Zealand), nv.
- Elizabeth Hay (b. 1951, Canada/Newfoundland), fiction wr.
- Karyn Hay (b. 1959, New Zealand), nv. & broadcaster
- Myfanwy Haycock (1913–1963, Wales), poet & broadcaster
- Anna Haycraft (Alice Thomas Ellis, 1932–2005, Wales), wr. & es.
- Mary Hayden (1862–1942, Ireland), historian
- Renée Hayek (living, Lebanon), fiction wr.
- Alice Hayes (1657–1720, England), Quaker preacher, non-f. wr.
- Matilda Hays (1820–1897, England), wr., journalist & actress
- Victoria Hayward (1876–1956, Bermuda), col. & travel wr.
- Eliza Haywood (1693–1756, England), nv., pw. & poet
- Helen Haywood (1907–1995, England), ch. wr.
- Shirley Hazzard (1931–2016, United States), nv. & fiction wr.
- Bessie Head (1937–1986, Botswana), fiction & non-f. wr.
- Helen Heath (b. 1970, New Zealand), poet
- Anne Hébert (1916–2000, Canada/Newfoundland), poet & nv.
- Chantal Hébert (b. 1954, Canada/Newfoundland), political col.
- Jennifer Michael Hecht (b. 1965, United States), poet, historian & philosopher
- Annie French Hector (1825–1902, Ireland/England), nv.
- Evalena Fryer Hedley (1865–1943, United States), journalist & wr.
- Barbro Hedvall (b. 1944, Sweden), education wr.
- Geum Hee (금희, b. 1979, Korea/China), fiction wr. in Korean
- Sylvia Vanden Heede (b. 1961, Belgium), ch. wr. in Flemish
- Ra Heeduk (나희덕, b. 1966, Korea), poet
- Marjorie van Heerden (b. 1949, South Africa), ch. wr. in Afrikaans & illustrator
- Marié Heese (b. 1942, South Africa), nv. in Afrikaans
- Ursula Hegi (b. 1946, Germany/United States), nv.
- Marie Heiberg (1890–1942, England), poet
- Uta-Maria Heim (b. 1963, Germany), crime wr., poet & pw.
- Úrsula Heinze (b. 1941, Germany/Spain), poet & fiction and ch. wr. in Galician
- Anita Heiss (b. 1968, Australia), fiction wr., poet & col.
- Lyn Hejinian (b. 1941, United States), poet, es. & translator
- Lin Van Hek (b. 1944, Australia), fiction wr.
- Etelka Kenéz Heka (b. 1936, Hungary), wr. & poet
- Liliana Heker (b. 1943, Argentina), fiction wr. & es.
- Guðrún Helgadóttir (1935–2022, Iceland), ch. wr.
- Adèle Hommaire de Hell (1819–1883, France), wr.
- Cat Hellisen (b. 1977, South Africa/Scotland), nv.
- Lillian Hellman (1905–1984, United States), pw.
- Lucinda Barbour Helm (1839–1897, United States), wr. & editor
- Guðrið Helmsdal (b. 1941, Faroe Islands), poet
- Rakel Helmsdal (b. 1966, Faroe Islands), fiction & non-f. wr.
- Felicia Hemans (1793–1835, England/Wales), poet in English
- Kristien Hemmerechts (b. 1955, Belgium), fiction wr. in Flemish & English
- Mercedes Sandoval de Hempel (1919–2005, Paraguay), social wr.
- Barbara Hemphill (died 1858, Ireland), nv.
- Anna Minerva Henderson (1887–1987, Canada), poet in English
- Beth Henley (b. 1952, United States), pw. & screenwriter
- Nathalie Henneberg (1910–1977, France), science fiction wr.
- Claire Hennessy (b. 1986, Ireland), YA wr.
- Emmy Hennings (1885–1948, Germany), poet & performer
- Agnes Henningsen (1868–1962, Denmark), fiction wr. & mem.
- Georgina Henry (1960–2014, England), journalist
- Marguerite Henry (1902–1997, United States), ch. wr.
- Luise Hensel (1798–1876, Germany), wr. & poet
- Rosa Henson (1927–1997, Philippines), autobiographer
- Ebba Hentze (1930–2015, Faroe Islands), ch. wr. & poet
- Heo Nanseolheon (허초희, 1563–1589, Korea), poet
- Heo Su-gyeong (허수경, 1964–2018, Korea)
- Sally Hepworth (b. 1980, Australia), wr.
- Toeti Heraty (1933–2021, Indonesia), poet
- Dorothea Herbert (c. 1767–1829, Ireland), diarist & poet
- Jane Emily Herbert (1821–1882, Ireland), poet
- Marie Herbert (b. 1941, Ireland/England), biographer & nv.
- Mary Sidney Herbert (1561–1621, England), poet & patron
- Sarah Herbert (1824–1846, Ireland/Canada/Newfoundland), wr.
- Iva Hercíková (1935–2007, Czechoslovakia/Czech Republic), nv. & screenplay wr.
- María Luisa Ocampo Heredia (1899–1974, Mexico), nv. & pw.
- Íeda Herman (1925–2019, Iceland), wr.
- Judith Hermann (b. 1970, Germany), fiction wr.
- Catherine Hermary-Vieille (b. 1943, France), nv.
- Marie Hermanson (b. 1956, Sweden), nv.
- Luisa Josefina Hernández (1928–2023, Mexico), nv. & pw.
- Georgina Herrera (1936–2021, Cuba), poet
- M. Miriam Herrera (b. 1963, United States), wr. & poet
- Jeanne Hersch (1910–2000, Switzerland), philosopher in French
- Stella K. Hershan (1915–2014, Austria/Austria-Hungary/United States), nv. & biographer
- Judith Herzberg (b. 1934, Netherlands), poet & pw.
- Karen Hesse (b. 1952, United States), ch. nv.
- Juliette Heuzey (1865–1952, France), nv. & biog.
- Dorothy Hewett (1923–2002, Australia), poet, nv. & pw.
- Ellen Hewett (1843–1926, Channel Islands/New Zealand), wr.
- Annie Hewlett (1887–1974), Canada, wr.
- Maryam Heydarzadeh (b. 1977, Iran/Persia), poet & singer.
- Elisabeth von Heyking (1861–1925, Germany), nv., travel wr. & diarist
- Charlotte von Hezel (1755–1817, Germany), wr. & journalist

=== Hi–Hy ===
- Grace Hibbard (ca. 1835 – 1911, United States), wr. & poet
- Eleanor Hibbert (several pseudonyms, 1906–1993, England), nv.
- Nienke van Hichtum (1860–1939, Netherlands), ch. wr. also in West Frisian
- Elizabeth Hickey (1917–1999, Ireland), local historian
- Emily Henrietta Hickey (1845–1924, Ireland/England), wr. & poet
- Mary St Domitille Hickey (1882–1958, New Zealand), historian & nun
- Mary Agnes Hickson (1821–1899, Ireland), antiquarian
- Stefani Hid (b. 1985, Indonesia/Germany), fiction wr.
- Akiko Higashimura (東村アキコ, b. 1975, Japan), manga creator
- F. E. Higgins (living, Ireland), ch. wr.
- Rita Ann Higgins (b. 1955, Ireland), poet & pw.
- Sarah Higgins (1830–1923, England/New Zealand), wr. & midwife
- Colleen Higgs (b. 1962, South Africa), poet & fiction wr. in English
- Helen Burns Higgs (1897–1983, Bahamas), wr. & illustrator
- Patricia Highsmith (1921–1995, United States), crime fiction wr.
- Asa Higuchi (ひぐちアサ, b. 1970, Japan), manga creator
- Keiko Higuchi (樋口恵子, b. 1932, Japan), social wr. & activist
- Ichiyō Higuchi (樋口一葉, 1872–1896, Japan), fiction wr.
- Tachibana Higuchi (樋口橘, b. 1976, Japan), manga creator
- Aoi Hiiragi (柊あおい, b. 1962, Japan), manga creator
- Nadia Hijab (living, Palestine/United States), political wr.
- Hildegard of Bingen (1098–1179, Germany), wr. in Latin, composer & abbess
- Ernestine Hill (1900–1972, Australia), travel wr. & nv.
- Eva Hill (1898–1981, New Zealand), wr. & physician
- Lorna Hill (1902–1991, England), ch. nv.
- Rosemary Hill (b. 1957, England), wr. & historian
- Rut Hillarp (1914–2003, Sweden), poet & nv.
- Wilhelmine von Hillern (1836–1916, Germany), nv. and actor
- Etty Hillesum (1914–1943, Netherlands), correspondent, diarist & Hc. victim
- Joanne C. Hillhouse (b. 1970s, Antigua), wr., col. & educator
- Hilda Hilst (1930–2004, Brazil), poet, pw. & nv.
- Kaoruko Himeno (姫野カオルコ, b. 1958, Japan), nv.
- Saeko Himuro (氷室冴子, 1957–2008, Japan), nv., es. & pw.
- Zahida Hina (living, India/Pakistan), es., fiction wr. & pw.
- Helen Hindpere, (Estonia), writer
- Vera Hingorani (1924–2018, India), gynecologist & medical wr.
- Pamela Hinkson (1900–1982, Ireland/England), nv.
- Matsuri Hino (樋野まつ, Japan), manga creator
- S. E. Hinton (b. 1948, United States), ch. nv.
- Taiko Hirabayashi (平林たい子, 1905–1972, Japan), fiction wr. & es.
- Hiratsuka Raichō (平塚らいちょう, 1886–1971, Japan), writer & activist
- Rozalie Hirs (b. 1965, Netherlands), poet & composer
- Afua Hirsch (b. 1981, England), wr. & broadcaster
- Marianne Van Hirtum (1925–1988, Belgium), poet in French
- Anna-Liisa Hirviluoto (1929–2000, Finland), archaeologist
- Laila Hirvisaari (1938–2021, Finland), fiction wr. & pw.
- Elina Hirvonen (b. 1975, Finland), wr. & film-maker
- Sofia Hjärne (1780–1860, Finland), salonnière & nv. in Swedish
- Hera Hjartardóttir (b. 1983, Iceland),
- Dagmar Hjort (1860–1902, Denmark), educator & activist
- Mary Hobhouse (1864–1901, Ireland/England), poet & nv.
- Laura Z. Hobson (1900–1986, United States), nv.
- Karla Höcker (1901–1992, Germany), nv. & biographer
- Merle Hodge (b. 1944, Trinidad), nv. & critic
- Louise Manning Hodgkins (1846–1935, United States), wr. & educator
- Helen Hodgman (1945–2022, Australia), nv. & screenwriter
- Eva Hodgson (1924–1920, Bermuda), political wr.
- Vere Hodgson (1901–1979), British diarist
- Daniela Hodrová (1946–2024, Czechoslovakia/Czech Republic), wr. & scholar
- Marjolijn Hof (b. 1956, Netherlands), ch. wr.
- Mari Ruef Hofer (1858/59–1929, United States), non-f. wr.
- Alice Hoffman (b. 1952, United States), nv. & YA & ch. wr.
- Nina Kiriki Hoffman (b. 1955, United States), fiction wr.
- Klementyna Hoffmanowa (1798–1845, Poland), fiction & ch. wr. & activist
- Barbara Hofland (1770–1844, England), ch. wr. & poet
- Linda Hogan (b. 1947, United States), poet & fiction wr.
- Zita Holbourne (b. 1960s, England), poet and non-fic. wr.
- Ann Catherine Holbrook (1780–1837, United Kingdom), actress and wr.
- Wendy Holden (b. 1961, England), biographer
- Wendy Holden (b. 1965, England), novelist
- Margaret Holford (1778–1852, England), poet & nv.
- Margaret Holford the Elder (1757–1834, England), nv, pw. & poet
- Heidi Holland (1947–2012, South Africa), col. & wr. in English
- Jane Holland (b. 1966, Isle of Man), poet, performer & nv.
- Norah M. Holland (1876–1925, Canada), wr., poet
- Sarah Holland (b. 1961, Isle of Man), wr., actor & singer
- Xaviera Hollander (b. 1943, Netherlands), mem.
- Gwen Hollington (1919–2014, England), translator
- Liddy Holloway (1947–2004, New Zealand), TV scriptwriter & actor
- Anne Holm (1922–1998, Denmark), col. & ch. wr.
- Maria Holm (1845–1912, Latvia), poet & fiction wr. in German
- Ada Augusta Holman (1869–1949, Australia), fiction & non-f. wr.
- Charlie N. Holmberg (b. 1988, United States), fantasy wr.
- Constance Holme (1880–1955, England), nv. & pw.
- Janet Holmes (b. 1947, New Zealand), socio-linguistics wr.
- Margie Holmes (living, Philippines), psychologist
- Mary Anne Holmes (1773–1805, Ireland), poet & wr.
- Johanna Holmström (b. 1981, Finland), fiction wr. in Swedish
- Lyubov Holota (b. 1949, Ukraine), fiction & non-f. wr. & poet
- Hanne-Vibeke Holst (b. 1959, Denmark), fiction & non-f. wr.
- Henriette Roland Holst (1869–1952, Netherlands), poet & politician
- Winifred Holtby (1898–1935, England), nv. & col.
- Ani Hona (1938–1997, New Zealand), wr., poet
- Xiao Hong (蕭紅, 1911–1942, China), fiction wr.
- Hong Yun-suk (홍윤숙, 1925–2015, Korea), poet
- Barbara Honigmann (b. 1949, Germany/France), pw.
- Hong Ying (虹影, b. 1962, China), poet & fiction wr.
- Lynley Hood (b. 1942, New Zealand), biographer
- Hilda Mary Hooke (1898–1978, Canada), poet & pw
- bell hooks (pen name of Gloria Jean Watkins; 1952–2021, United States), feminist academic
- Maryam Hooleh (b. 1978, Iran/Persia), wr. & poet
- Ellen Sturgis Hooper (1812–1848, United States), poet
- Ofelia Hooper (1900–1981, Panama), poet & activist
- Pauline Hopkins (1859–1930, United States), nv., col. & pw.
- Nalo Hopkinson (b. 1960, Jamaica/Canada/Newfoundland), fiction wr.
- Felicitas Hoppe (b. 1960, Germany), fiction & ch. wr.
- Mererid Hopwood (b. 1964, Wales), poet
- María Gertrudis Hore (1742–1801, Spain), poet
- Jessica Horn (b. 1979, England), activist & poet
- Marya Hornbacher (b. 1974, United States), wr. & col.
- Amelia Horne (1839–1921, United Kingdom), memoir wr.
- Isabel Hornibrook (1859–1952, Ireland/United States), ch. wr.
- Maria Teresa Horta (b. 1937, Portugal), poet & activist
- Corinne Stocker Horton (1871–1947, United States), non-f. wr., ed.
- Ellen Hørup (1871–1953, Denmark), non-f. wr.
- Sally El Hosaini (living, Wales), scriptwriter & film director
- Tatsuko Hoshino (星野立子, 1903–1984, Japan), poet
- Chieko Hosokawa (細川智栄子, b. 1935, Japan), manga creator
- Janette Turner Hospital (b. 1942, Australia), fiction wr.
- Selina Hossain (b. 1947, India/Bangladesh), nv.
- Yumi Hotta (堀田由美, b. 1957, Japan), manga creator
- Colette Sénami Agossou Houeto (b. 1939, Benin), poet & educator
- Louise Seymour Houghton (1838–1920, United States), non-f. writer
- Norah Hoult (1898–1984, Ireland/England), fiction wr.
- Gisèle Hountondji (b. 1954, Benin), nv. & es.
- Jeanne Wakatsuki Houston (1934–2024, United States), wr.
- Penelope Houston (1927–2015, England), film critic and journal editor
- Annelise Hovmand (1926–2016, Denmark), screenwriter & film director
- Maureen Howard (1930–2022, United States), nv., mem. & editor
- Philippa Howden-Chapman (living, New Zealand), public health wr. & academic
- Fanny Howe (b. 1940, United States), poet & fiction wr.
- Julia Ward Howe (1819–1910, United States), abolitionist, activist & poet; "The Battle Hymn of the Republic"
- Samantha Lee Howe (b. 1965, England), fiction wr. & pw.
- Susan Howe (b. 1937, United States), poet, scholar & critic
- Ada Verdun Howell (1902–1981, Australia/United States), poet
- Edith Howes (1872–1954, England/New Zealand), ch. wr. & educator
- Anna Mary Howitt (1824–1884, England), wr. & feminist
- Mary Howitt (1799–1888, England), poet & ch. wr.; "The Spider and the Fly"
- Ana María Vázquez Hoys (b. 1945, Spain), Anc. history professor
- Elizabeth Hoyt (pen name Julia Harper, living, United States), nv.
- Elizabeth Orpha Sampson Hoyt (pen name Aunt Libbie; 1828–1912, United States), philosopher, poet, wr., lecturer
- Hrotsvith von Gandersheim (c. 935–c. 1002, Germany), pw. & poet in Latin
- Hrytsko Hryhorenko (1867–1924, Ukraine), poet & col.
- Maryna Hrymych (b. 1961, Ukraine), nv. & academic
- Hu Lanqi (胡兰畦, 1901–1994, China), wr. & military commander
- Ganggang Hu Guidice (胡剛剛, b. 1984, United States), writer & artist
- Huang E (黄峨, 1498–1569, China), poet
- Madame Huarui (花蕊夫人, c. 940–976, China), poet & imperial concubine
- Therese Huber (1764–1829, Germany), fiction & travel wr.
- Ricarda Huch (1864–1947, Germany), historian, nv. & poet
- Anna Hude (1858–1934, Denmark), historian
- Eva Hudečková (b. 1949, Czechoslovakia/Czech Republic), wr. & pw.
- Kerry Hudson (b. 1980, Scotland), wr. & nv.
- Mary-Anne Plaatjies van Huffel (1959–2020, South Africa), pastor & academic
- Arianna Huffington (b. 1950, Gk/United States), wr. & col.
- Pauline von Hügel (1858–1901, England), religious wr.
- Lynn Huggins-Cooper (b. 1964, England), fiction, non-f. & ch. wr.
- Ann Harriet Hughes (Gwyneth Vaughan, 1852–1910, Wales), nv.
- Babette Hughes (1906–1982, United States), pw.
- Caoilinn Hughes (living, Ireland), fiction wr.
- Ellen Hughes (1867–1927, Wales), poet, es. & suffragist
- Frieda Hughes (b. 1960, England), poet & painter
- Shirley Fenton Huie (1924–2016, Australia), non-f. wr.
- Hulda (1881–1946, Iceland), wr. & poet
- Akasha Gloria Hull (b. 1944, United States), poet, educator & critic
- Keri Hulme (1947–2021, New Zealand), fiction wr. & poet
- Petra Hůlová (b. 1979, Czechoslovakia/Czech Republic), nv.
- Maria Aletta Hulshoff (1781–1846, Netherlands), pamphleteer
- Marie-Thérèse Humbert (b. 1940, Mauritius), fiction wr.
- Mary Vance Humphrey (1838-1916, United States), non-f. wr., nv,
- Margaret Wolfe Hungerford (1855–1897, Ireland), nv.
- Arlene Hunt (b. 1972, Ireland), crime wr.
- Vilma Rose Hunt (1926–2012, Australia/United States), scientist
- Bem Le Hunte (b. 1964, India/Australia), nv.
- Anne Hunter (1742–1821, England), poet & salonnière
- Kristin Hunter (1931–2008, United States), nv.
- Constance Hunting (1925–2006, United States), poet
- Accabre Huntley (b. 1967, England), poet
- Florence Huntley (1861–1912, United States), editor & humorist
- Dương Thu Hương (b. 1947, Vietnam), dissident & nv.
- Hồ Xuân Hương (1772–1822, Vietnam), poet
- Fannie Hurst (1885–1968, United States), nv.
- Rosalind Hursthouse (b. 1943, England/New Zealand), moral philosopher
- Zora Neale Hurston (1891–1960, United States), fiction wr., folklorist & anthropologist
- Shahrukh Husain (b. 1950, Pakistan/England), wr. of fiction, non-f. & screenwriter
- Sibyl Marvin Huse (1866–1939, France/United States), non-f.
- Fahmida Hussain (b. 1948, Pakistan), literary scholar
- Saliha Abid Hussain (1913–1988, India), nv. & ch. wr.
- Nancy Huston (b. 1953, Canada/Newfoundland), nv. & es. in French & English
- Sarah Huston (1848-1926, United States), non-f. wr.
- Genevieve L. Hutchinson (1883–1974, United States), poet
- Lucy Hutchinson (1620–1681, England), biographer
- Krishna Hutheesing (1907–1967, India), biographer
- Emily Huws (b. 1942, Wales), ch. wr.
- Elspeth Huxley (1907–1997, England/Kenya), mem. & col.
- Cornélie Huygens (1948–2002, Netherlands), nv. & political wr.
- Hwang In-suk (황인숙, b. 1958, Korea), poet
- Hwang Jini (황진이, c. 1506 – c. 1560, Korea), courtesan
- Hwang Jung-eun (황정은, b. 1976, Korea), fiction wr.
- Hwang Sun-mi (황선미, b. 1963, Korea), fable wr. & academic
- Abby B. Hyde (1799–1872, United States), hymn wr.
- Robin Hyde (1906–1939, South Africa/New Zealand), poet
- Liz Hyder (b. 1976 or 1977, England), nv.
- Lady Hyegyeong (헌경왕후, 1735–1816, Korea), mem.
- Prue Hyman (b. 1943, New Zealand), economist
- Hypatia (c. 350/370–415, Ancient Greece), philosopher & mathematician in Latin

== I ==
- Marcela Iacub (b. 1964, Argentina), nv. & es. in French
- Juana de Ibarbourou (1892–1979, Uruguay), poet
- Eva Ibbotson (1925–2010, Austria/Austria-Hungary/England), nv. in English
- Nilima Ibrahim (1921–2002, Bangladesh), wr.
- Amelia Denis de Icaza (1836–1911, Panama), poet
- Carmen de Icaza, 8th Baroness of Claret (1899–1979, Spain), nv.
- Yael Ichilov (b. 1968, Israel), nv.
- Ida, Countess von Hahn-Hahn (1805–1880, Germany), nv.
- Yumiko Igarashi (いがらしゆみこ, b. 1950, Japan), manga creator
- Luisa Igloria (b. 1961, Philippines/United States), poet
- Jung Ihyun (b. 1972, Korea), wr.
- Lempi Ikävalko (1901–1994, Finland), poet & col.
- Koi Ikeno (池野恋, b. 1959, Japan), manga creator
- Gō Ikeyamada (池山田剛, living, Japan), manga creator
- Bassey Ikpi (b. 1976, Nigeria), poet & mental health advocate
- Shaista Suhrawardy Ikramullah (1915–2000, India/Pakistan), fiction & non-f. wr.
- Nora Ikstena (1969–2026, Latvia), wr.
- Ryo Ikuemi (いくえみ綾, b. 1964, Japan), manga/creator
- Branislava Ilić (b. 1970, El Salvador), pw., prose & screenwriter
- Maria Ilnicka (1825/1827–1897, Poland), poet, nv. & translator
- Im Yunjidang (任允摯堂, 1721–1793, Korea), scholar & philosopher
- Jahanara Imam (1929–1994, Bangladesh), non-f. wr., diarist & activist
- Natsuko Imamura (今村夏子, b. 1980), fiction wr.
- Saba Imtiaz (b. 1985, Pakistan), nv. & col.
- Vera Inber (1890–1972, Russia/Soviet Union), poet & es.
- Elizabeth Inchbald (1753–1821, England), nv., actor & pw.
- Mirjam Indermaur (b. 1967, Switzerland), psychotherapy wr. in German
- M. K. Indira (1917–1994, India), nv.
- Marilla Baker Ingalls (1828–1902, United States/Burma), non-f. wr.
- Rachel Ingalls (1940–2019, United States), nv.
- Jean Ingelow (1820–1897, England), poet
- Elisabeth Inglis-Jones (1900–1994, Wales), nv. & biographer
- Anne Bower Ingram (1937–2010, Australia), ch. wr.
- Lotte Ingrisch (1930–2022, Austria/Austria-Hungary), nv., pw. & screenwriter
- Frid Ingulstad (1935–2026, Norway), nv. & ch. wr.
- Catherine Lucy Innes (c. 1840–1900, England/New Zealand), wr.
- Lyn Innes (b. 1940, England/Australia), academic & wr.
- Bozenna Intrator (b. 1964, Poland/United States), nv., poet & pw. in German, Polish & English
- Sylvia Iparraguirre (b. 1947, Argentina), nv. & activist
- Ōtomo no Sakanoe no Iratsume (大伴坂上郎女, c. 700–750, Japan), poet
- Mary E. Ireland (1834–1927, United States), wr., translator, poet
- Fanny Irvine-Smith (1878–1948, New Zealand), col. & local historian
- Inez Haynes Irwin (1873–1970, Brazil/United States), fiction & non-f. wr.
- Norah Isaac (1914–2003, Wales), wr. & educator
- Fríða Ísberg (b. 1992, Iceland), wr. & poet
- Ulla Isaksson (1916–2000, Sweden), fiction wr. & screenwriter
- Palmira Jaquetti i Isant (1895–1963, Spain), poet & ethnologist
- Ada Maria Isasi-Diaz (1943–2012, Cuba/United States), theologian & non-f. wr.
- Svetlana Ischenko (b. 1969, Ukraine), poet, translator & actor
- Lady Ise (伊勢, c. 875–c. 938, Japan), poet
- Ise no Taifu (伊勢大輔, fl. early 11th century, Japan), poet
- Yuka Ishii (石井遊佳, b. 1953, Japan/India), fiction wr.
- Aleksandra Ishimova (1805–1881, Russia), ch. wr. & translator
- Michiko Ishimure (石牟礼道子, 1927–2018, Japan), wr. & activist
- Farhat Ishtiaq (b. 1980, Pakistan), nv. & screenwriter
- Elizabeth Isichei (b. 1939, Nigeria), wr. & academic
- Kate Isitt (1876–1948, New Zealand/England), col. & nv.
- Nina Iskrenko (1951–1995, Russia), poet
- Sariamin Ismail (1909–1995, Dutch East Indies/Indonesia), nv.
- Siti Zainon Ismail (b. 1949, Malaysia), fiction wr., poet & academic
- Rashidah Ismaili (b. 1941, Benin/United States), poet, fiction wr. & pw.
- Dora d'Istria (1828–1888, Romania/Italy), wr. on science & politics
- Gerta Ital (1904–1988, Germany), non-f. wr.
- Frances Itani (b. 1942, Canada/Newfoundland), nv., poet & es.
- Keiko Itō (伊藤 敬子, 1935–2020, Japan), poet
- Itō Noe (伊藤野枝, 1895–1983, Japan), wr. & social critic
- Risa Itō (伊藤理佐, b. 1969, Japan), manga creator
- Natsumi Itsuki (樹なつみ, b. 1960, Japan), manga creator
- Edna Iturralde (b. 1948, Ecuador), ch. wr.
- Nora Iuga (b. 1931, Romania), poet and prose wr.
- Jurga Ivanauskaitė (1961–2007, Lithuania), nv. & es.
- Oksana Ivanenko (1906–1997), children's wr. & translator
- Mirela Ivanova (b. 1962, Bulgaria), poet
- Praskovya Ivanovskaya (1852–1935, Russia/Soviet Union), autobiographer
- Rada Iveković (b. 1945, Yugoslavia/Croatia), philosopher
- Nada Iveljić (1931–2009, Yugoslavia/Croatia), ch. wr.
- Eowyn Ivey (b. 1973, United States), nv.
- Molly Ivins (1944–2007, United States), col.
- Helen Ivory (b. 1969, England), poet
- Princess Iwa (磐之媛命, died 347, Japan), poet
- Mariko Iwadate (岩館真理子, b. 1957, Japan), manga creator
- Margarita de Mayo Izarra (1889–1969, Spain), literature wr.
- Mari Carmen Izquierdo (1950–2019, Spain), sports wr.
- Kaneyoshi Izumi (和泉かねよし, living, Japan), manga creator
- Izumi Shikibu (和泉式部, b. c. 976, Japan), poet

== J ==
=== Ja–Jh ===
- Noni Jabavu (1931–2008, South Africa), mem. & col. in English
- Jožka Jabůrková (1896–1942, Austria/Austria-Hungary/Czechoslovakia/Czech Republic), wr. & translator
- Annemarie Jacir (living, Palestine), fiction & screenwriter
- Helen Hunt Jackson (1830–1885, United States), nv.; Ramona
- Shelley Jackson (b. 1963, Philippines/United States), fiction wr. & es.
- Shirley Jackson (1916–1965, United States), fiction wr.
- Sandra Jackson-Opoku (b. 1953, United States), poet, nv. & screenwriter
- Rosamond Jacob (1888–1960, Ireland), wr. & diarist
- Violet Jacob (1863–1946, Scotland), poet & nv.
- Harriet Jacobs (1813–1897, United States), mem.; Incidents in the Life of a Slave Girl
- Rayda Jacobs (1947–2024, South Africa), wr. & filmmaker
- Annie Jacobsen (b. 1967, United States), non-f. wr.
- Josephine Jacobsen (1908–2003, United States), poet, fiction wr. & critic
- Lis Jacobsen (1882–1961, Denmark), philologist & archaeologist
- Ethel Jacobson (1899–1991, United States), poet
- Ethel Jacobson (editor) (1877–1965, New Zealand), newspaper editor
- Agnes E. Jacomb (1866–1949, England), nv.
- Paula Jacques (b. 1949, Egypt/France), nv.
- Frances Jacson (1754–1842, England), nv.
- Doris Jadan (1925–2004, United States), natural historian & cookery wr.
- Ann Jäderlund (b. 1955, Sweden), poet & pw.
- Fleur Jaeggy (b. 1940, Switzerland), nv. in Italian
- Kim Jae-Young (b. 1966, Korea), wr. & academic
- Manorama Jafa (b. 1932, India), ch. wr.
- Ada Jafarey (1924–2015, Pakistan), poet in Urdu
- Aziza Jafarzade (1921–2003, Azerbaijan), wr. & philologist
- Noemi Jaffe (b. 1962, Brazil), wr. & critic
- Rona Jaffe (1932–2005, United States), nv.
- Marie Jaffredo (b. 1966, France), comics wr.
- Janet Jagan (1920–2009, United States/Guyana), poet, ch. wr. & politician
- Dorta Jagić (b. 1974, Yugoslavia/Canada/Newfoundland), poet & wr.
- Annamarie Jagose (b. 1965, New Zealand), fiction wr. & academic
- Nasreen Jahan (b. 1966, Bangladesh), nv. & editor
- Rashid Jahan (1905–1952, India), fiction wr. & pw.
- Meenakshi Jain (living, India), historian
- Sunita Jain (1940–2017, India), scholar, fiction wr. & poet
- Linda Jaivin (b. 1955, Australia), nv. & non-f. wr.
- Svava Jakobsdóttir (1930–2004, Iceland), pw. & fiction wr.
- Elfriede Jaksch (1842–1897, Latvia), fiction wr. in German
- Ayesha Jalal (b. 1956, Pakistan/United States), historian
- Magdalena Jalandoni (1891–1978, Philippines), feminist wr.
- Rosa Jamali (b. 1977, Iran/Persia), poet, critic & pw.
- Alice James (1848–1892, United States), diarist
- Andrea James (b. 1967, United States), non-f wr. & transgender activist
- Barbara James (1943–2003, Australia), historian
- Christine James (b. 1954, Wales), poet & academic
- Cynthia James (b. 1948, Trinidad/Canada/Newfoundland), pw., fiction wr. & poet
- Florence James (1902–1993, New Zealand/Australia), wr.
- Margaret Helen James (1859–1938, England) non-f. and folklorist
- Maria James (1793–1868, Wales), poet
- P. D. James (1920–2014, England), nv.
- Rebecca James (b. 1970, Australia), YA wr.
- Wendy James (b. 1966, Australia), nv.
- Wendy James (b. 1940, England), anthropologist
- Winifred Lewellin James (1876–1941, Australia), nv. & travel wr.
- Anna Brownell Jameson (1794–1860, Ireland/England), art & literature wr.
- Vilma Jamnická (1906–2008, Czechoslovakia/Czech Republic/Slovakia), astrologer & actor
- Emma Jane (b. 1969, Australia), nv. & col.
- Maria de la Pau Janer (b. 1966, Spain), nv. in Catalan & Spanish
- Clara Janés (b. 1940, Spain), poet, fiction wr. & es.
- Elizabeth Janeway (1913–2005, United States), nv.
- Jang Eun-jin (장은진, b. 1976, Korea)
- Éva Janikovszky (1926–2003, Hungary), ch. wr.
- Maria Janitschek (Marius Stein, 1859–1927, Austria/Austria-Hungary), poet & fiction wr.
- Tama Janowitz (b. 1957, United States), fiction wr. & screenwriter
- Tove Jansson (1914–2001, Finland), nv. & ch. wr. in Swedish
- Anja Jantschik (b. 1969, Germany), wr. & col.
- Florence Page Jaques (1890–1972, United States), nature & travel wr.
- Rosemary Hawley Jarman (1935–2015, England), fiction wr.
- Dragojla Jarnević (1812–1875, Austria/Austria-Hungary), poet in Croatian
- Lisa Jarnot (b. 1967, United States), poet
- Nada Awar Jarrar (living, Lebanon), nv.
- Bella Jarrett (1926–2007, United States), romance wr. & actor
- Delia Jarrett-Macauley (living, England), wr., academic & broadcaster
- Marguerite Florence Laura Jarvis (Oliver Sandys, 1886–1964, Wales), nv. & actor
- Christine Maria Jasch (b. 1960, Austria/Austria-Hungary), economist & non-f. wr.
- Vidmantė Jasukaitytė (1948–2018, Lithuania), poet, fiction wr. & es.
- Florence Jaugey (b. 1959, France/Nicaragua), screenwriter
- Fattaneh Haj Seyed Javadi (b. 1945, Iran/Persia), nv.
- Aghabeyim agha Javanshir (Aghabaji, 1780–1832, Azerbaijan/Iran/Persia), poet
- Charlotte Jay (Geraldine Halls, 1919–1996, Australia), mystery wr.
- Pupul Jayakar (1915–1997, India), wr. & activist
- Kirthi Jayakumar (b. 1987, India), activist & wr.
- Salma Khadra Jayyusi (1926/1927–2023, Palestine/United States), fiction wr. & poet
- Rula Jebreal (b. 1973, Israel/Italy), fiction wr. & Palestine analyst
- Barbara Jefferis (1917–2004, Australia), radio pw. & nv.
- Margo Jefferson (b. 1947, United States), wr. & academic
- Sheila Jeffreys (b. 1948, Australia), feminist scholar & wr.
- Jefimija (1349–1405, Serbia), poet
- Andrea Jeftanovic (b. 1970, Chile), wr. & academic
- Gertrude Jekyll (1843–1932, England), garden wr.
- Cynthia Jele (living, South Africa), nv. in English
- Elfriede Jelinek (b. 1946, Austria/Austria-Hungary), pw. & nv.; 2004 Nobel Prize in Literature
- Joyce Angela Jellison (b. 1969, United States), wr.
- N. K. Jemisin (b. 1972, United States), science fiction & fantasy wr.
- Gish Jen (b. 1956, United States), wr.
- Ida Jenbach (1868 – c. 1943, Austria/Austria-Hungary), pw., screenwriter & Hc. victim
- Barbara Jenkins (living, Trinidad), fiction wr.
- Biddy Jenkinson (b. 1949, Ireland), poet
- Elizabeth B. Jenkins American spirituality writer
- Rosemary Jenkinson (b. 1967, Northern Ireland), poet, pw. & fiction writer
- Lynn Jenner (living, New Zealand), poet & es.
- Theodora Robinson Jenness (1847–1935, United States), wr., editor
- Elizabeth Jennings (1926–2001, England), poet
- Kate Jennings (1948–2021, Australia), poet, nv. & es.
- Zoë Jenny (b. 1974, Switzerland), nv. in German & English
- Kristine Marie Jensen (Frøken Jensen, 1858–1923, Denmark), domestic & cookery wr.
- Thit Jensen (1876–1957, Denmark), fiction wr. & pw.
- Helen Jerome (1883–1958, Australia), poet, pw. & non-f. wr.
- Milena Jesenská (1896–1944, Austria/Austria-Hungary/Czechoslovakia/Czech Republic), wr. & translator
- Ana de Jesús (1545–1621, Spain), wr., poet & nun
- Carolina Maria de Jesus (1914–1977, Brazil), diarist & activist
- Jaqueline Jesus (b. 1978, Brazil), wr. & activist
- Lisa Jewell (b. 1968, England), fiction wr.
- Sarah Orne Jewett (1849–1909, United States), fiction wr.
- Geraldine Jewsbury (1812–1880, England), nv.
- Ruth Prawer Jhabvala (1927–2013), Germany/United States), nv. & screenwriter

=== Ji–Ju ===
- Jiang Biwei (蔣碧薇, 1899–1978, China), mem.
- Pamela Jiles (b. 1960, Chile), col. & politician
- Paulette Jiles (b. 1943, United States/Canada/Newfoundland), poet & nv.
- Rina Jimenez-David (b. 1955, Philippines), col. & non-f. wr.
- Meiling Jin (b. 1956, Guyana/England), poet, fiction and social wr.
- Empress Jitō (持統天皇, 645–702, Japan), poet & empress
- Jo Kyung-ran (조경란, b. 1969, Korea), nv.
- Liesl Jobson (living, South Africa), poet in English & musician
- Ann Henning Jocelyn (b. 1948, Sweden/Ireland), pw. & nv.
- Rita Joe (1932–2007, Canada/Newfoundland), poet
- Alexandra Joel (b. 1953, Australia), fiction & non-f. wr.
- Eeva Joenpelto (1921–2004, Finland), nv.
- Sigrið av Skarði Joensen (1908–1975, Faroe Islands), col. & teacher
- Nadezhda Joffe (1906–1995, Soviet Union/United States), mem.
- Khasnor Johan (living, Malaysia), historian
- Kristine Martine Johannessen (1855–1933, Norway), magazine editor
- Ólafía Jóhannsdóttir (1863–1924, Iceland), non-f. wr.
- Hanna Johansen (b. 1939, Germany/Switzerland), philology & ch. wr. in German
- Oddvør Johansen (b. 1941, Faroe Islands), nv.
- Klara Johanson (1875–1948, Sweden), critic & es.
- Majken Johansson (1930–1993, Sweden), poet & Salvation Army member
- Amryl Johnson (1944–2001, Trinidad/England), poet & travel wr.
- Angela Johnson (b. 1961, United States), ch. wr. & poet
- Catherine Johnson (b. 1962, England), wr. & screenwriter
- Catherine Johnson (b. 1957, England), pw.
- Daisy Johnson (b. 1990, England), fiction wr.
- Diane Johnson (b. 1934, United States), nv. & es.
- Electa Amanda Wright Johnson (1938–1929, United States), es. & non-f. wr.
- Georgia Douglas Johnson (1877–1966, United States), poet
- Helene Johnson (1906–1995, United States), poet
- Josephine Johnson (1910–1990, United States), nv., poet & es.
- Kate Johnson (b. 1982, England), nv.
- Mary Fitchett Johnson (died 1863, England), poet
- Pauline Johnson (1861–1913, Canada/Newfoundland), poet
- Rebecca Johnson (b. 1966, Australia), ch. wr.
- Sarah Johnson (b. 1980, South Africa), poet in English
- Sophia Orne Johnson (1826–1899, United States), wr
- Stephanie Johnson (b. 1961, New Zealand), poet, pw. & fiction wr.
- Susan Johnson (b. 1939, United States), nv.
- Susan Johnson (b. 1956, Australia), fiction wr.
- Susannah Willard Johnson (1729–1810, United States), mem.
- Alexa Johnston (living, New Zealand), biographer & food wr.
- Christine Johnston (b. 1950, New Zealand), fiction wr.
- Dorothy Johnston (b. 1948, Australia), fiction wr.
- Jennifer Johnston (b. 1930, Ireland), nv.
- Maria I. Johnston (1835–1921, United States), American nv., non-f. wr.
- Mary Johnston (1870–1936, United States), nv.
- Velda Johnston (1912–1997, United States), nv.
- Elísabet Jökulsdóttir (b. 1958, Iceland), poet, fiction wr. & pw.
- Elizabeth Jolley (1923–2007, Australia), nv.
- Jon Kyongnin (전경린, b. 1962, Korea), poet
- Alice Gray Jones (1852–1943, Wales), wr. & editor
- Cherie Jones (b. 1974, Barbados), wr.
- Diana Wynne Jones (1934–2011, England), nv.
- Gail Jones (b. 1955, Australia), nv. & academic
- Gayl Jones (b. 1949, United States), nv.
- Jill Jones (b. 1951, Australia), poet
- Laura Jones (b. 1951, Australia), screenwriter
- Lauren-Shannon Jones (b. c. 1989, Ireland), pw. & screenwriter
- Margaret Jones (1923–2006, Australia), fiction & non-f. wr.
- Marion Patrick Jones (1931–2016, Trinidad), nv.
- Mary Vaughan Jones (1918–1983, Wales), ch. wr. & educator
- Patricia Spears Jones (b. 1951, United States), poet
- Sandy Jones (b. 1943, United States), parenting wr.
- Tayari Jones (b. 1970, United States), nv.
- V. M. Jones (b. 1958, Zambia/New Zealand), ch. wr.
- Erica Jong (b. 1942, United States), nv.
- Carla de Jonge (1886-1972, Netherlands), non-f. wr.
- Ingrid Jonker (1933–1965, South Africa), poet in Afrikaans
- Ágústína Jónsdóttir (b. 1949, Iceland), poet & educator
- Áslaug Jónsdóttir (b. 1963, Iceland), ch. wr. & pw.
- Auður Jónsdóttir (b. 1973, Iceland), nv.
- Birgitta Jónsdóttir (b. 1967, Iceland), poet & politician
- Pamela Jooste (living, South Africa), nv. in English
- June Jordan (1936–2002, United States), poet, nv. & autobiographer
- Kate Jordan (1862–1926, Ireland/United States), nv. & pw.
- Sherryl Jordan (b. 1949, New Zealand), ch. & YA wr.
- Toni Jordan (b. 1966, Australia), nv.
- Lídia Jorge (b. 1946, Portugal), novelist
- Lieve Joris (b. 1953, Belgium), travel wr. in Flemish
- Barbare Jorjadze (1833–1895, Georgia (Caucasus)), wr. & princess
- Isabel de Josa (c. 1508–1575, Spain), humanist & Latinist
- Jenny Joseph (1932–2018, England), poet
- Sarah Joseph (b. 1946, India), fiction wr.
- Isha Basant Joshi (1908 – post-2004, India), fiction wr. & poet
- Rebecca Richardson Joslin (1846–1934, United States), non-f. wr.
- Gaëlle Josse (b. 1960, France), poet & nv.
- Maria Jotuni (1880–1943, Finland), fiction wr. & pw.
- Elsa Joubert (1922–2020, South Africa), nv. in Afrikaans
- Irma Joubert (b. 1947, South Africa), nv. in Afrikaans
- Leonie Joubert (living, South Africa), science wr. in English
- Alice Jouenne (1873–1954, France), non-f. wr.
- Carol Joynt (fl. 2010s, United States), wr., businesswoman
- Mireille Juchau (b. 1969, Australia), nv.
- Mary Catherine Judd (1852–1930s, United States), ch. wr. & non-f. wr.
- Juana Teresa Juega López (1885–1979, Spain), poet
- Antonie Jüngst (1843-1918, Germany), poet and writer
- Erna Juel-Hansen (1845–1922, Denmark), nv. & activist
- Vanda Juknaitė (b. 1949, Lithuania), fiction wr. & pw.
- Heidi Julavits (b. 1968, United States), col. & nv.
- Conxita Julià (1920–2019, Spain), poet in Catalan
- Lucie Julia (1927–2023, Guadeloupe), poet & nv.
- Miranda July (b. 1974, United States), wr.
- Anees Jung (b. 1944, India), biographer
- Jung Eun-gwol (정은궐, living, Korea), nv.
- Jung Ihyun (정이현, b. 1972, Korea), nv.
- Jung Mikyung (정미경, 1960–2017, Korea), nv.
- Mari Jungstedt (b. 1962, Sweden), nv.
- Cristina Jurado (b. 1972, Spain), fiction wr.
- Irena Jurgielewiczowa (1903–2003, Poland), ch. & YA wr.
- Dorothy Misener Jurney (1909–2002, United States), political wr.

== K ==
=== Ka–Kh ===
- Aminata Maïga Ka (1940–2005, Senegal), fiction wr.
- Keri Kaa (1942–2020, New Zealand), TV & ch. wr.
- Lene Kaaberbøl (b. 1960, Denmark), ch. & crime wr.
- Philippa Namutebi Kabali-Kagwa (b. 1964, Uganda/Kenya), mem. & ch. wr.
- Naila Kabeer (b. 1950, Bangladesh/England), wr. & economist
- Jane Kaberuka (b. 1956, Uganda), fiction wr. & autobiographer
- Siddika Kabir (1931–2012, India/Bangladesh), nutrition & cookery wr.
- Helena Kadare (b. 1943, Albania), fiction wr.
- Pauline Kael (1919–2001, United States), film critic
- Margit Kaffka (1880–1918, Hungary), nv. & poet
- Sirpa Kähkönen (b. 1964, Finland), nv.
- Elina Kahla (b. 1960, Finland), philologist & academic
- Elaine Kahn (living, United States), poet & wr.
- Ivande Kaija (1876–1942, Latvia), political wr.
- Isabelle Kaiser (1866–1925, Switzerland), poet & fiction wr. in French & German
- Hilda Käkikoski (1864–1912, Finland), ch. wr. & politician
- Nyana Kakoma (living, Uganda), wr.
- Maguy Kakon (b. 1953, Morocco), politician & wr
- Mitsuyo Kakuta (角田光代, b. 1967, Japan), fiction wr.
- Lejla Kalamujić (b. 1980, Yugoslavia/Bosnia-Herzegovina), fiction wr.
- Ana Kalandadze (1924–2008, Georgia (Caucasus)), poet
- Sheema Kalbasi (b. 1972, Iran/Persia), poet & rights advocate
- Zaruhi Kalemkaryan (1871–1971, Armenia), prose wr.
- Elvy Kalep (1899–1989, Estonia), ch. wr. & aviator
- Aino Kallas (1878–1956, Finland/Estonia), fiction wr. in Finnish
- Leszli Kálli (living, Comoros/Canada/Newfoundland), kidnapped diarist
- Laxmi Kallicharan (1951–2002, Guyana), wr.
- Tuula Kallioniemi (b. 1951, Finland), ch. wr.
- Iryna Kalynets (1940–2012, Ukraine), political wr.
- Sophie Heidi Kam (b. 1968, Burkina Faso), poet & pw. in French
- Sufia Kamal (1911–1999, India/Bangladesh), poet & activist
- Ronelda Kamfer (b. 1981, South Africa), poet in Afrikaans
- Anna Kamieńska (1920–1986, Poland), poet & ch. & YA wr.
- Androulla Kaminara (b. 1957), Cypriot EU official & ambassador
- Yoko Kamio (神尾葉子, b. 1966, Japan), manga creator
- Anja Kampmann (b. 1983, Germany), poet & nv.
- Sissal Kampmann (b. 1974, Faroe Islands), poet
- Vera Kamsha (b. 1962, Soviet Union/Russia), nv.
- Keturah Kamugasa (died 2017, Uganda), wr. & col.
- Meena Kandasamy (b. 1984, India), poet & fiction wr.
- Mare Kandre (1962–2005, Sweden), fiction wr. & poet
- Julie Kane (b. 1952, United States), poet, scholar & editor
- Sarah Kane (1971–1999, England), pw.
- Hitomi Kanehara (金原ひとみ, b. 1983, Japan), nv.
- Yadé Kara (b. 1965, Turkey/Ottoman Empire/Germany), nv.
- Shakuntala Karandikar (1931–2018, India), non-f.
- Kaarina Kari (1888–1982, Finland), non fiction wr.
- Irina Karnaoukhova (1901–1959, Ukraine and Russia), ch. wr.
- Josiane Kartheiser (b. 1950, Luxembourg), poet, pw. & ch. wr. in German & Luxembourgeois
- Urve Karuks (1936–2015, Estonia and Canada), poet
- Miranda Kaufmann (b. 1982, England), historian, journalist & educator
- Joséphine Nyssens Keelhoff (1833–1917, Belgium), ed.
- Harriet B. Kells (1842–1913, United States), ed.
- Beth Kelly, (b. ?, United States), university professor
- Mirdza Ķempe (1907–1974, Latvia), poet & translator
- Kang Hwa-gil (b. 1986, South Korea), fiction wr.
- Agnès Kraidy (b. 1965), Ivorian journalist
- Kang Kyeong-ae (강경애, 1906–1944, Korea), nv. & poet
- Kang Sok-kyong (강석경, b. 1951, Korea), fiction wr.
- Kang Young-sook (강영숙, b. 1967, Korea), fiction wr.
- Maarja Kangro (b. 1973, Estonia), poet & fiction wr.
- Aya Kanno (菅野文, b. 1980, Japan), manga creator
- Fabienne Kanor (b. 1970, France), nv. & filmmaker
- Anna Kańtoch (b. 1976, Poland), fiction wr.
- Eva Kantůrková (b. 1930, Czechoslovakia/Czech Republic), fiction wr. & screenwriter
- Nasiha Kapidžić-Hadžić (1932–1995, Yugoslavia/Bosnia-Herzegovina), ch. wr. & poet
- Lila Rose Kaplan (b. 1980, United States), pw.
- Nelly Kaplan (1931–2020, Argentina), nv., es. & scriptwriter in French
- Kristina Kappelin (b. 1958, Sweden), wr. on Italian relations
- Mehrangiz Kar (b. 1944, Iran/Persia), wr. & rights activist
- Yadé Kara (b. 1965, Turkey/Ottoman Empire/Germany), nv., actor & educator
- Ekaterina Karabasheva (b. 1989, Bulgaria), poet & fiction wr.
- Teréz Karacs (1808–1892, Hungary), poet & mem.
- Mina Karadžić (1828–1894, Serbia), wr. & painter
- Margarita Karapanou (1946–2008, Greece), nv.
- Anna Karima (1871–1949, Bulgaria), wr. & activist
- Alma Karlin (1889–1950, Yugoslavia/Slovenia), fiction & travel wr. & pw.
- Ghada Karmi (b. 1939, Palestine/England), mem. & physician
- Farida Karodia (b. 1942, South Africa), fiction wr. in English
- Carmen Karr (1865–1943, Spain), feminist wr.
- Anna Louisa Karsch (1722–1791, Germany), poet & correspondent
- Junko Karube (軽部潤子, living, Japan), manga creator
- Ugnė Karvelis (1935–2002, Lithuania/France), nv. & translator
- Ioanna Karystiani (b. 1952, Greece), screenwriter
- Lady Kasa (笠郎女, early 8th century, Japan), poet
- Marie Luise Kaschnitz (1901–1974, Germany), nv. & poet
- Maki Kashimada (鹿島田真希, b. 1976, Japan), fiction wr.
- Anna Kashina (living, Russia/United States), nv.
- Stoja Kašiković (1865 – post-1927, Serbia), wr.
- Nina Kasniunas (b. 1972, United States), wr. & political scientist
- Leila Kasra (1939–1989, Iran/Persia), poet & songwriter
- Kapka Kassabova (b. 1973, Bulgaria/Scotland), wr. in English
- Kassia (810 – pre-865, Byzantium), poet & composer in Greek
- Lada Kaštelan (b. 1961, Yugoslavia/Croatia), pw. & screenwriter
- Elizabeth Kata (1912–1998, Australia), nv.
- Olivera Katarina (b. 1940, Serbia), poet
- Hoda Katebi (هدی کاتبی, living, Iran/Persia/United States), fashion wr.
- Marianne Katoppo (1943–2007, Indonesia), nv. & theologian
- Kazuyo Katsuma (勝間和代, b. 1968, Japan), business wr.
- Janina Katz (1939–2013, Poland/Denmark), poet in Danish
- Suzan Emine Kaube (b. 1942, Turkey/Ottoman Empire/Germany), non-f. wr.
- Gina Kaus (1893–1985, Austria/Austria-Hungary/United States), nv., screenwriter & autobiographer
- Julia Kavanagh (1824–1877, Ireland), nv. & non-f. wr.
- Rose Kavanagh (1859 or 1860–1891, Ireland), wr. & poet
- Joanna Kavenna (b. 1974, England), nv. & travel wr.
- Catherine Samali Kavuma (b. 1960, Uganda/United States), nv.
- Kazune Kawahara (河原和音, b. 1972, Japan), manga creator
- Yumiko Kawahara (川原由美子, b. 1960, Japan), manga creator
- Hiromi Kawakami (川上弘美, b. 1958, Japan), nv. & poet
- Kikuko Kawakami (川上喜久子, 1904–1985, Japan), fiction wr.
- Mieko Kawakami (川上未映子, b. 1976, Japan), fiction & non-f. writer & poet
- Mizuki Kawashita (河下水希, b. 1971, Japan), manga creator
- Merata Kawharu (living, New Zealand), wr, & academic
- Jackie Kay (b. 1961, Scotland), poet & nv.
- M. M. Kaye (1908–2004, England), nv. & illustrator
- Susanna Kaysen (b. 1948, United States), wr. & mem.
- Rimma Kazakova (1932–2008, Soviet Union/Russia), poet
- Rabia Kazan (b. 1976, Turkey/Ottoman Empire/United States), political wr.
- Elena Kazantseva (b. 1956, Soviet Union/Russia), poet & songwriter
- Irena Kazazić (b. 1972, Serbia), wr.
- Kazumi Kazui (一井かずみ, living, Japan), manga creator
- Ke Yan (柯岩, 1929–2011, China), pw., nv. & poet
- Molly Keane (1904–1996, Ireland), nv. & pw.
- Susanna Kearsley (b. 1966, Canada/Newfoundland), nv.
- Annie Keary (1825–1879, England), nv. & poet
- Henrietta Keddie (1827–1914, Scotland), nv. & ch. wr.
- Janice Kulyk Keefer (b. 1952, Canada/Newfoundland), nv. & poet
- Claire Keegan (b. 1968, Ireland), wr.
- Nancy Keesing (1923–1993, Australia), poet, nv. & non-f. wr.
- Antigone Kefala (1935–2022, Australia), poet & prose wr.
- Fatou Keïta (b. 1965, Ivory Coast), ch. wr.
- China Keitetsi (b. 1976, Uganda), mem.
- Anne Kellas (b. 1951, South Africa/Australia), poet
- Yuko Takada Keller (高田ケラー有子, b. 1958, Japan), es. & artist
- Cathy Kelly (b. 1966, Ireland), nv.
- Gwen Kelly (1922–2012, Australia), fiction wr. & poet
- Helen Keller (1880–1968, United States), es. & autobiographer
- Linda Kelly (1936–2019, England), historian of romanticism
- Lindy Kelly (b. 1952, New Zealand), fiction & ch. wr. & pw.
- Maeve Kelly (1930–2025, Ireland), fiction wr. & poet
- Mary Eva Kelly (1826–1910, Ireland/Australia), poet & es.
- Rita Kelly (b. 1953, Ireland), poet & col.
- Gene Kemp (1926–2015, England), ch. wr.
- Jennie Murray Kemp (1858–1928, United States), editor, publisher, circulation manager, press superintendent
- Oonya Kempadoo (b. 1966, England), nv.
- Margery Kempe (c. 1373–1438, England), autobiographer & mystic
- May Kendall (1861–1943, England), poet, nv. & satirist
- Latofat Kenjaeva (b. 1950, Tajikistan), poet & wr.
- A. L. Kennedy (b. 1965, United States), nv. & non-f. wr. & es.
- Adrienne Kennedy (b. 1931, United States), pw
- Anne Kennedy (b. 1959, New Zealand), nv., poet & screenwriter
- Betty Kennedy (1926–2017, Canada/Newfoundland), broadcaster & wr.
- Louise Kennedy (b. 1967, Ireland), nv.
- Margaret Kennedy (1896–1967, England), nv.
- Mary Olivia Kennedy (1880–1943, Ireland/England), critic & col.
- Nina Kennedy (b. 1960, United States), memoirist & screenwriter
- Pagan Kennedy (b. c. 1963, United States), wr. & col.
- Hannah Kent (b. 1985, Australia), wr.
- Jacqueline Kent (b. 1947, Australia), biographer & non-f. wr.
- Alice Annie Kenny (1875–1960, New Zealand), poet & fiction wr.
- Angela Kepler (b. 1943, New Zealand), naturalist & nature wr.
- Maylis de Kerangal (b. 1967, France), nv.
- Rivka Keren (b. 1946, Hungary/Israel), nv. in Hebrew
- Amanda Kerfstedt (1835–1920, Sweden), nv. & pw.
- Josephine Kermode (Cushag, 1852–1937, Isle of Man), poet & pw.
- Joan Haverty Kerouac (1931–1990, United States), autobiographer
- Doris Boake Kerr (Capel Boake, 1899–1945, Australia), nv.
- Judith Kerr (1923–1919, Germany/England), ch. wr.
- Lady Amabel Kerr (1846–1906, United Kingdom), wr., biog., nv., ch. wr.
- Suzi Kerr (b. 1966, New Zealand), economist
- Marie-Thérèse Kerschbaumer (b. 1936, Austria/Austria-Hungary), nv. & poet
- Fatemeh Keshavarz (b. 1952, Iran/Persia), scholar & poet
- Birhan Keskin (b. 1963, Turkey/Ottoman Empire), poet
- Eufrosinia Kersnovskaya (1908–1984, Russia/Soviet Union), mem.
- Marie Kessels (b. 1954, Netherlands), poet & prose wr.
- Jessie Kesson (1916–1994, Scotland), wr.
- Hedwig Kettler (1851–1937, Germany), fiction & non-f. wr. & activist
- Yvonne Keuls (1931–2025, Dutch East Indies/Netherlands), nv.
- Irmgard Keun (1905–1982, Germany), nv.
- Ellen Key (1849–1926, Sweden), wr. on family life
- Marian Keyes (b. 1963, Ireland), fiction & non-f. wr.
- Eugénie De Keyser (1918–2012, Belgium), wr. on art in French
- Harriette A. Keyser (1841–1936, United States), nv. & biog.
- Jennie Ellis Keysor (1860–1945, United States), non-f. wr.
- 'Masechele Caroline Ntseliseng Khaketla (1918–2012, Lesotho), poet & educator
- Porochista Khakpour (b. 1978, Iran/Persia/United States), nv.
- Sheila Khala (b. 1990/1991, Lesotho), poet
- Farida Khalaf (b. c. 1995, Iraq), escapee & wr.
- Anbara Salam Khalidi (1897–1986, Palestine/Lebanon), political mem.
- Sahar Khalifeh (b. 1941, Palestine), nv.
- Hamda Khamis (b. 1945, Bahrain), poet & col.
- Annie Ali Khan (1980–1918, Pakistan), social & religious wr.
- Rabina Khan (b. 1972, Bangladesh/England), wr. & politician
- Razia Khan (c. 1936–2011, India/Bangladesh), wr., poet & educator
- Rukhsana Khan (b. 1962, Pakistan/Canada/Newfoundland), ch. wr.
- Uzma Aslam Khan (living, Pakistan), nv.
- Heyran Khanim (1790–1847, Azerbaijan/Iran/Persia), poet in Azerbaijani & Persian
- Dalal Khario (b. c. 1997, Iraq), ISIS survivor & mem.
- Dima Khatib (b. 1971, Palestine), col. & poet
- Rabeya Khatun (1935–2021, India/Bangladesh), nv.
- Rita El Khayat (b. 1944, Morocco), psychiatrist & anthropologist
- Sabiha Al Khemir (b. 1959, Tunisia), fiction & art wr.
- Babilina Khositashvili (1884–1973, Georgia (Caucasus)), poet & feminist
- Vénus Khoury-Ghata (1937–2026, Lebanon/France), nv. & poet
- Mariam Khutsurauli (b. 1960, Georgia (Caucasus)), poet & fiction wr.
- Nadezhda Khvoshchinskaya (1824–1889, Russia), nv.

=== Ki–Ky ===
- Sue Monk Kidd (b. 1948, United States), nv.
- Fiona Kidman (b. 1940, New Zealand), fiction wr., poet & scriptwriter
- Celine Kiernan (b. 1967, Ireland), YA wr.
- Susan Nalugwa Kiguli (b. 1969, Uganda), poet & scholar
- Toshie Kihara (木原敏江, b. 1948, Japan), manga creator
- Emelihter Kihleng (living, Manchuria), poet in English
- Lali Kiknavelidze (b. 1969, Georgia (Caucasus)), screenwriter & film director
- Anne Killigrew (1660–1685, England), poet
- Dorothy Kilner (1755–1836, England), ch. wr.
- Eeva Kilpi (b. 1928, Finland), fiction wr. & poet
- Ae-ran Kim (김애란, b. 1980, Korea), fiction wr.
- Kim Byeol-ah (김별아, b. 1969, Korea), nv.
- Kim Chae-won (김채원, b. 1946, Korea), fiction wr.
- Kim Chi-won (김지원, 1943–2013, Korea/United States), fiction wr.
- Kim Hu-ran (김후란, b. 1934, Korea), poet
- Kim Hyesoon (김혜순, b. 1955, Korea), poet
- Kim Insuk (김인숙, b. 1963, Korea/China), fiction wr.
- Kim Ja-rim (김자림, 1926–1994, Korea), playwright
- Kim Myeong-sun (김명순, 1896–1951, Korea), nv. & poet
- Myung Mi Kim (김명미, b. 1957, Korea/United States), poet in English
- Kim Nam-jo (김남조, 1927–2023, Korea), poet & academic
- Ronyoung Kim (1926–1987, United States), wr.
- Kim Ryeo-ryeong (김려령, b. 1971, Korea), ch. & YA wr.
- Kim Sagwa (김사과, b. 1984, Korea), fiction wr. & col.
- Kim Seon-wu (김선우, b. 1970, Korea), feminist poet
- Kim Seung-hee (김승희, b. 1952, Korea), poet, es. & nv.
- Barbara Kimenye (1929–2012, Uganda), ch. wr.
- Kodai no Kimi (小大君, fl. 9th or 10th century, Japan), poet
- Jamaica Kincaid (b. 1949, Antigua/United States), nv.
- Annamária Kinde (b. 1956–2014, Russia), wr. & poet in Hungarian
- Aby King (b. 1977, England), wr. & nv.
- Carla King (living, Ireland), historian
- Grace King (1852–1932, United States), fiction wr. & historian
- Margaret King (1773–1835, Ireland/Italy), travel & medical wr.
- Rachael King (b. 1970, New Zealand), fiction wr. & musician
- Rosamond S. King (living, United States), poet & academic
- Tabitha King (b. 1949, United States), nv.
- Karen King-Aribisala (living, Guyana/Nigeria), fiction wr. & academic
- Mary Kingsley (1862–1900, England), explorer & science wr.
- Barbara Kingsolver (b. 1955, United States), fiction wr., poet & es.
- Maxine Hong Kingston (b. 1940, Chile/United States), nv. & academic
- Johanna Kinkel (1810–1858, Germany), wr., composer & educator
- Elaine Kinsella (b. 1981, Ireland), wr. & radio pw.
- Sophie Kinsella (1969–2025, England), nv.
- Yuki Kiriga (霧賀ユキ, living, Japan), manga creator
- Eleanor Kirk (1831–1908, United States), wr.
- Lucy Kirkwood (b. 1983, UK)
- Olga Kirsch (1924–1997, South Africa/Israel), poet in English & Hebrew
- Sarah Kirsch (1935–2013, Germany), poet
- Rio Kishida (岸田理生, 1946–2003, Japan), pw.
- Madhu Kishwar (b. 1951, India), feminist wr.
- Noémi Kiss (b. 1974, Hungary), fiction wr. & es.
- Nadia Yala Kisukidi (b. 1978, France), wr. & academic
- Yao Kitabatake (北畠八穂, 1903–1982, Japan), poet & ch. wr.
- Nobori Kiuchi (木内昇, b. 1967), nv.
- Iya Kiva (b. 1984, Ukraine), poet, translator, wr.
- Ella Kivikoski (1901–1990, Finland), archaeologist
- Karin Kiwus (b. 1942, Germany), poet & academic
- Carolyn Kizer (1925–2014, United States), poet
- Marjun Syderbø Kjelnæs (b. 1974, Faroe Islands), ch. & fiction wr. & poet
- Nada Klaić (1920–1988, Yugoslavia/Croatia), historian
- Elizabeth Klarer (1910–1994, South Africa), wr. in English on extraterrestrial visions
- Gerda Weissmann Klein (1924–2022, Poland/United States), mem. & activist
- Naomi Klein (b. 1970, Canada/Newfoundland), wr. & activist
- Robin Klein (b. 1936, Australia), ch. wr.
- Nancy H. Kleinbaum (1948–2024, United States), nv. & ch. wr.
- Laureana Wright de Kleinhans (1846–1896, Mexico), poet & activist
- Ellen Kleman (1867–1943, Sweden), women's rights activist
- Irena Klepfisz (b. 1941, Poland/United States), linguist & activist
- Marusya Klimova (b. 1961, Russia/Soviet Union), nv. & es.
- Linde Klinckowström-von Rosen (1902–2000, Sweden), equestrian & travel wr.
- Ekaterina Kniazhnina (1746–1797, Russia), poet
- Anne Knight (1786–1862, England), social reformer
- India Knight (b. 1965, England), journalist & author
- Anne Knight (1792–1860, England), ch. wr.
- Olivia Knight (1830–1908, Ireland/Australia), poet & es.
- Sophie von Knorring (1797–1848, Sweden), nv.
- Thekla Knös (1815–1880, Sweden), poet & ch. wr.
- Lilian Knowles (1870–1926), economic historian
- Marion Knowles (1865–1949, Australia), poet & nv.
- Elizabeth Knox (b. 1959, New Zealand), fiction wr. & es.
- Janette Hill Knox (1845–1920, United States), religious wr., editor, activist, teacher
- Kathleen Knox (1847–1930, Ireland), ch. wr. & poet
- Mary Norbert Körte (1934–2022, United States), poet, teacher & environmentalist
- Miyuki Kobayashi (小林深雪, living, Japan), nv. & manga wr.
- Nataliya Kobrynska (1851–1920, Austria/Austria-Hungary/Ukraine), fiction & political wr.
- Olha Kobylianska (1863–1942, Austria/Austria-Hungary/Romania), wr. in Ukrainian
- Shonagh Koea (b. 1939, New Zealand), fiction wr.
- Yun Kōga (高河ゆん, b. 1965, Japan), manga creator
- Joy Kogawa (b. 1935, Canada/Newfoundland), nv. & poet
- Sheila Kohler (b. 1941, South Africa/United States), fiction wr.
- Věra Kohnová (1929–1942, Czechoslovakia/Czech Republic), Hc. diarist
- Lydia Koidula (1843–1886, Russia/England), poet in Estonian
- Saradha Koirala (b. 1980, New Zealand/Australia), poet & YA wr.
- Ingrid de Kok (b. 1951, South Africa), poet in English
- Musine Kokalari (1918–1973, Albania), wr. & politician
- Jana Kolarič (b. 1954, Yugoslavia/Slovenia), fiction & ch. wr. & pw.
- Zlata Kolarić-Kišur (1894–1990, Austria/Austria-Hungary/Yugoslavia), nv. in Croatian
- Nellie van Kol (1851–1930, Netherlands), feminist, educator, & ch. wr.
- Annette Kolb (1870–1967, Germany), political wr., nv. & wr. on music
- Margarete Kollisch (1893–1979, Austria/Austria-Hungary), poet & translator
- Alexandra Kollontai (1872–1952, Russia/Soviet Union), wr. & politician
- Gertrud Kolmar (1894–1943, Germany), poet & Hc. victim
- Anise Koltz (1928–2023, Luxembourg), poet & ch. wr. in French & German
- Liv Køltzow (1945–2025, Norway), nv., pw. & es.
- Ono no Komachi (825–900, Japan), poet
- Anna Komnene (1083–1183, Byzantium), chronicler & emperor's daughter in Greek; Alexiad
- Usher Komugisha (b. c. 1988, Uganda), sports journalist & commentator
- Marie Kondo (近藤麻理恵, b. 1984, Japan), organization wr.
- Amalia Wilhelmina Königsmarck (1663–1740, Sweden), painter, actor & poet
- Fumiyo Kōno (こうの史代, b. 1968, Japan), manga creator
- Taeko Kono (河野多惠子, 1926–2015, Japan), fiction wr. & es.
- Maria Konopnicka (1842–1910, Poland), nv. & poet
- Evgenia Konradi (1838–1898, Russia), wr., es. & col.
- Ina Konstantinova (1924–1944, Soviet Union), diarist & war victim
- Alicia Kopf (b. 1982, Spain), nv. & artist
- Ana Kordzaia-Samadashvili (b. 1968, Georgia (Caucasus)), nv. & col.
- Alice Graeme Korff (1904–1975, United States), art critic
- Rachel Korn (1898–1982, Poland/Canada/Newfoundland), poet & prose wr.
- Barbara Korun (b. 1963, Yugoslavia/Slovenia), poet
- Sonya Koshkina (b. 1985, Ukraine), journalist, & editor-in-chief
- Birgithe Kosovic (b. 1972, Denmark), nv.
- Zofia Kossak-Szczucka (1889–1968, Poland), political wr. & Hc. survivor
- Lina Kostenko (b. 1930, Soviet Union/Ukraine), poet
- Elizabeth Kostova (b. 1964, United States), nv.
- Rita Kothari (b. 1969, India), social & political wr.
- Helene Kottanner (c. 1400 – post-1470, Hungary), mem. in German
- Adjoua Flore Kouamé (b. 1964, Ivory Coast), nv.
- Sofia Kovalevskaya (1859–1891, Russia), wr. & mathematician
- Heda Margolius Kovály (1919–2010, Czechoslovakia/Czech Republic/United States), wr. & Hc. survivor
- Shih-Li Kow (b. 1968, Malaysia), fiction wr.
- Chana Kowalska (1899 – c. 1942, Poland/France), art wr. & Hc. victim
- Faustina Kowalska (1905–1938, Poland), diarist, nun & religious wr.
- Natsuki Koyata (古谷田 =奈月, b. 1981, Japan), nv.
- Alicia Kozameh (b. 1953, Argentina), fiction wr. & poet
- Nadezhda Kozhevnikova (b. 1949, Soviet Union/Russia), nv.
- Zoya Krakhmalnikova (1929–2008, Soviet Union/Russia), scholar & autobiographer
- Hanna Krall (b. 1935, Poland), wr., nv. & Hc. survivor
- Taja Kramberger (b. 1970, Yugoslavia/Slovenia), poet, es. & anthropologist
- Clementine Krämer (1873–1942, Germany), poet, fiction wr. & Hc. victim
- Judith Krantz (1928–2019, United States), wr. & col.
- Eliška Krásnohorská (1847–1946, Austria/Austria-Hungary/Czechoslovakia/Czech Republic), feminist wr.
- Nicole Krauss (b. 1974, United States), fiction wr. & es.
- Helen Kleinbort Krauze (living, Poland/Mexico), travel wr. & col.
- Ursula Krechel (b. 1947, Germany), poet, prose wr. & pw.
- Katarzyna Krenz (b. 1953, Poland/Peru), nv., poet & painter
- Maruša Krese (1947–2013, Yugoslavia/Slovenia), poet & fiction wr.
- Michelle de Kretser (b. 1957, Australia), nv.
- Velga Krile (1945–1991, Latvia), poet & pw.
- Uma Krishnaswami (b. 1956, India/United States), ch. wr.
- Julia Kristeva (b. 1941, Bl/France), nv. & philosopher
- Gerður Kristný (b. 1970, Iceland), poet & nv.
- Ágota Kristóf (1935–2011, Hungary/Switzerland), nv. in French
- Vesna Krmpotić (1932–2018, Yugoslavia/Croatia), nv.
- Antjie Krog (b. 1952, South Africa), poet & academic in Afrikaans
- Leena Krohn (b. 1947, Finland), fiction & ch. wr. & es.
- Brigitte Kronauer (1940–2019, Germany), nv.
- Yvonne Kroonenberg (b. 1950, Netherlands), non-f. wr.
- Helen Aldrich De Kroyft (1818–1915, United States), wr.
- Olga Kryuchkova (b. 1966, Soviet Union/Russia), nv.
- Marta Krūmiņa-Vitrupe (1908–2010, Latvia/United States), poet & es.
- Mina Kruseman (1839–1922, Netherlands), pw. & mem.
- Agnes von Krusenstjerna (1894–1940, Sweden), nv.
- Christina Krüsi (b. 1968, Bolivia/Switzerland), wr. on child abuse in German
- Susanna Kubelka (b. 1942, Austria/Austria-Hungary), nv. & col.
- Žofia Kubini (fl. 17th century, Hungary), poet in Czech
- Nadja Küchenmeister (b. 1981, Germany), poet & feature author
- Rohana Kudus (1884–1972, Dutch East Indies/Indonesia), wr. on women's skills
- Ayşe Kulin (b. 1941, Turkey/Ottoman Empire), fiction & screenwriter
- Annette Kullenberg (1939–2021, Sweden), nv. & broadcasting pw.
- Mojca Kumerdej (b. 1964, Yugoslavia/Slovenia), fiction wr. & critic
- Maxine Kumin (1925–2014, United States), poet & ch. wr.
- Xu Kun (徐坤, b. 1965, China), fiction wr.
- Maria Kuncewiczowa (1895–1989, Poland/United States), nv.
- Kirsi Kunnas (1924–2021, Finland), poet & ch. wr.
- Thérèse Kuoh-Moukouri (b. 1938, Cameroon/France), nv. & es.
- İsmet Kür (1916–2013, Turkey/Ottoman Empire), ch. wr.
- Maki Kureishi (1927–1995, India/Pakistan), wr.
- Natsuko Kuroda (黒田 夏子, b. 1937, Japan), fiction wr.
- Tetsuko Kuroyanagi (黒柳徹子, b. 1933, Japan), ch. wr. & actor
- Irma Kurti (b. 1966, Albania), poet & wr.
- Gerdina Hendrika Kurtz (1899–1989, Netherlands), history wr.
- Isolde Kurz (1853–1944, Germany), poet & fiction wr.
- Meta Kušar (b. 1952, Yugoslavia/Slovenia), poet & es.
- Rachel Kushner (b. 1968, United States), nv.
- Ellen Kuzwayo (1914–2006, South Africa), activist & politician in English
- Zofka Kveder (1878–1926, Austria/Austria-Hungary/Yugoslavia), fiction wr. & pw. in Slovenian
- Nestan Kvinikadze (b. 1980, Georgia (Caucasus)), scriptwriter & pw.
- Jean Kwok (living, United States), nv.
- Kwon Teckyoung (권택영, b. 1947, Korea), critic & academic
- Kwon Yeo-sun (권여선, b. 1965, Korea), fiction wr.
- Joanne Kyger (1934–2017, United States), poet
- Goretti Kyomuhendo (b. 1965, Uganda), nv. & activist

== L ==
=== La–Le ===
- Esmeralda Labye (b. 1973, Belgium), journalist
- Ángela Labordeta (b. 1964, Spain), fiction wr.
- Carilda Oliver Labra (1922–2018, Cuba), poet
- Maria del Pilar Maspons i Labrós (1841–1907, Spain), poet & novelist
- María Elvira Lacaci (1916–1997, Spain), poet
- Suzanne Lacascade (1884–1966, Martinique), novelist
- María Hortensia Lacau (1910–2006, Argentina), pedagogue, wr., es., poet, educator
- Bernarda de Lacerda (1596–1644, Portugal), scholar & pw.
- Vera Lachmann (1904–1985, Germany/United States), poet & educator
- Djanet Lachmet (b. 1948, Algeria/France), nv. & actor
- Minna Lachs (1907–1993, Austria/Austria-Hungary), educator & mem.
- Camilla Läckberg (b. 1974, Sweden), nv.
- Mercedes Lackey (b. 1950, United States), nv.
- Anna Lacková-Zora (1899–1988, Austria/Austria-Hungary/Czechoslovakia/Czech Republic), poet & fiction wr. in Slovak
- Monique Laederach (1938–2004, Switzerland), poet, nv. & radio pw. in French
- Ann-Helén Laestadius (b. 1971, Sweden), YA wr.
- May Laffan (1849–1916, Ireland), nv.
- Carmen Laforet (1921–2004, Spain), fiction wr.
- Marcela Lagarde (b. 1948, Mexico), social wr. & politician
- Selma Lagerlöf (1858–1940, Sweden), nv. & ch. wr.; 1909 Nobel Prize in Literature
- Magdalene Isadora La Grange (1864–1935, United States), poet
- Margaret Rebecca Lahee (1831–1895, Ireland/England), dialect wr.
- Shahla Lahiji (1942–2024, Iran/Persia), wr.
- Jhumpa Lahiri (b. 1967, England/United States), fiction wr.
- Ana Emilia Lahitte (1921–2013, Argentina), poet, pw. & es.
- Leila Lahlou (living, Morocco), autobiographer
- Maria Chessa Lai (1922–2012, Italy), poet
- Maria Laina (b. 1947, Greece), poet
- Sinikka Laine (b. 1945, Finland), YA wr.
- Sylvie Lainé (b. 1957, France), science fiction wr.
- Olivia Laing (b. 1977, England), wr. & cultural critic
- Sarah Laing (b. 1973, New Zealand), fiction wr., mem. & cartoonist
- Angeliki Laiou (1941–2008, Greece/United States), historian of Byzantium
- Elizabeth Laird (b. 1943, England), travel & ch. wr.
- Natasha Lako (b. 1948, Albania), poet & nv.
- Laila Lalami (b. 1968, Morocco/United States), es. & nv.
- Nuray Lale (b. 1962, Turkey/Ottoman Empire/Germany), wr.
- Ritu Lalit (b. 1964, India), fiction wr.
- Lalleshwari (Lal Arifa; 1320–1392, India), mystic & poet in Kashmiri
- Caitriona Lally (living, Ireland), fiction wr.
- Nikita Lalwani (living, India/Wales), nv.
- Marta Lamas (b. 1947, Mexico), anthropologist & political scientist
- Lady Caroline Lamb (1785–1828, England), nv.
- Charlotte Lamb (Sheila Holland, 1937–2000, Isle of Man), nv.
- Christina Lamb (b. 1965, England), wr. & columnist
- Helen Lamb (1956–2017, Scotland), poet
- Mary Lamb (1764–1847, England), co-wr. of Charles Lamb
- Alice Elinor Lambert (1886–1981, United States), nv.
- Mitì Vigliero Lami (b. 1957, Italy), es. & poet
- Regina de Lamo (1870–1947, Spain), political wr.
- Elish Lamont (c. 1800/1816–1870, Ireland), wr. & miniaturist
- Anne Lamott (b. 1954, United States), fiction & non-f. wr.
- Astrid Lampe (b. 1955, Netherlands), poet & actor
- Rachida Lamrabet (b. 1970, Morocco/Belgium), nv. & pw. in Flemish
- Wafaa Lamrani (b. 1960, Morocco), poet
- Beatrice Lamwaka (living, Uganda), fiction & non-f. wr.
- Luo Lan (1919–2015, Taiwan), wr. & radio personality.
- Hermine Lanctôt (1861-1943, Canada) non-f. wr.
- Leena Lander (b. 1955, Finland), nv.
- Fran Landesman (1927–2011, United States), poet & lyricist
- Margarita Landi (1918–2004, Spain), nv. & screenwriter
- Zoila Ugarte de Landívar (1864–1969, Ecuador), wr. & suffragist
- Salcia Landmann (1911–2002, Ukraine/Switzerland), writer in Yiddish
- Letitia Elizabeth Landon (L. E. L., 1802–1838, England), poet & nv.
- Margaret Landon (1903–1993, United States), nv.
- Liliane Landor (b. c. 1956, Lebanon), non-f. wr.
- Michele Landsberg (b. 1939, Can), wr., feminist & activist
- Ruth Landshoff (1904–1966, Germany/United States), poet & wr. in German & English
- Anne Landsman (b. 1959, South Africa), nv. in English
- Jane Lane (1905–1978, England), nv. & biographer
- Margaret Lane (1907–1994, England), journalist, biographer & nv.
- Fátima Langa (1953– 2017, Mozambique), wr., poet, & publisher
- Annabel Langbein (b. 1958, New Zealand), food wr. & cook
- Rosamond Langbridge (1880–1964, Ireland), poet, nv. & pw.
- Dagmar Lange (1914–1991, Sweden), nv.
- Norah Lange (1905–1972, Argentina), poet, nv. & autobiographer
- Katja Lange-Müller (b. 1951, Germany), nv.
- Gertrude Langer (1908–1984, Australia), art critic
- Anna Langfus (1920–1966, Poland/France), pw., nv. & Hc. survivor
- Elisabeth Langgässer (1899–1950, Germany), poet, nv. & Hc. survivor
- Eve Langley (1908–1974, Australia/New Zealand), nv.
- Mary Lewis Langworthy (1872–1949, United States), pw.
- Emilia Lanier (1569–1645, England), poet
- Coral Lansbury (1929–1991, Australia), nv. & academic
- Sara Berenguer Laosa (1919–2010, Spain), feminist wr.
- Jeanne Lapauze (1860–1920, France), poet & nv.
- Paula Lapido (b. 1975, Spain), fiction wr.
- Yvette Lapointe (1912–1994, Canada), comics wr.
- Nadezhda Lappo-Danilevsky (1874–1951, Russia/France), poet & fiction wr.
- Alda Lara (1930–1962, Algeria), poet
- Justine Larbalestier (b. 1967), YA fiction wr.
- Lucy Larcom (1824–1893, United States), poet & mill girl
- Rebecca Hammond Lard (1772–1855, United States), poet
- Dalenda Larguèche (b. 1953, Tunisia), historian
- Yasmeen Lari (b. c. 1941, India/Pakistan), wr. on architecture
- Anna Larina (1914–1996, Russia/Soviet Union), mem.
- Glenda Larke (living, Australia), fiction & non-f. wr.
- Viveca Lärn (b. 1944, Sweden), ch. wr.
- Claudia Lars (1899–1974, Somalia), poet
- Hanna Astrup Larsen (1873–1945), writer, editor, translator
- Marianne Nøhr Larsen (b. 1963, Denmark), anthropologist & social wr.
- Nella Larsen (1891–1964, United States), fiction wr.
- Trude Brænne Larssen (b. 1967, Norway), nv.
- Åsa Larsson (b. 1966, Sweden), nv.
- Guðrún Lárusdóttir (1880–1938, Iceland), wr. & politician
- Else Lasker-Schüler (1869–1945, Germany), poet & pw.
- Marghanita Laski (1915–1988, England), fiction wr., biographer & pw.
- Ana Irma Rivera Lassén (b. 1955, Paraguay), poet, feminist & lawyer
- Margrethe Lasson (1659–1738, Denmark), poet & nv. in Danish
- Oriane Lassus (b. 1987, France), wr., cartoonist, illustrator
- Marija Lastauskienė (1872–1957, Lithuania), fiction wr.
- Agnes Latham (1905–1996, England), wr., editor & academic
- Irene Latham (b. 1971, United States), poet & ch. wr.
- Mary Artemisia Lathbury (1841–1913, United States), hymnist & poet
- Lathóg of Tír Chonaill (fl. 9th century, Ireland), poet
- Yulia Latynina (b. 1966, Russia), wr.
- Evelyn Lau (b. 1971, Canada/Newfoundland), poet & nv.
- Margaret Laurence (1926–1987, Canada/Newfoundland), fiction wr.
- Camille Laurens (b. 1957, France), nv.
- Vivi Laurent-Täckholm (1898–1978, Sweden), botanist & ch. wr.
- Teresa de Lauretis (1938–2026, Italy), non-f. wr.
- Dorianne Laux (b. 1952, United States), poet
- Christine Lavant (1915–1973, Austria/Austria-Hungary), religious poet & nv.
- Maura Laverty (1907–1966, Ireland), fiction & cookery wr. & broadcaster
- Mary Lavin (1912–1996, Ireland), fiction wr.
- Mónica Lavín (b. 1955, Mexico), fiction & YA wr.
- Nel Law (1914–1990, Australia), poet, diarist & artist
- Emily Lawless (1845–1913, Ireland), nv. & poet
- Patrice Lawrence (living, England), fiction wr.
- Alice Lawrenson (1841–1900, Ireland), botanist & gardener
- Louisa Lawson (1848–1920, Australia), poet, wr. & feminist
- Mary Lawson (b. 1946, Canada/Newfoundland), nv.
- Sylvia Lawson (1932–2017, Australia), historian & critic
- Auður Laxness (1918–2012, Iceland), wr.
- Jelena Lazarević (1365–1443, Serbia), wr.
- Simone Lazaroo (b. 1961, Australia), nv.
- Ruzha Lazarova (b. 1968, Bulgaria/France), fiction wr. & pw.
- Emma Lazarus (1849–1887, United States), poet; "The New Colossus" (inscribed on Statue of Liberty)
- Henryka Łazowertówna (1909–1942, Poland), poet & Hc. victim
- Linda Lê (1963–2022, Vietnam/France), nv.
- Sonya Lea (b. 1960, United States), ess., memoirist, & screenwr.
- Mary Leadbeater (1758–1826, Ireland), poet & prose wr.
- Jane Leade (1624–1704, England), mystic
- Anna Leader (b. 1996, Luxembourg), poet & nv. in English
- Caroline Woolmer Leakey (1827–1881, Australia), poet & nv.
- Louisa Leaman (b. 1976, England), wr. on education
- Sarah Lean (living, England), ch. wr.
- Danuza Leão (1933–2022, Brazil), wr. & col.
- Mary Leapor (1722–1746, England), poet
- Ada Leask (1899–1987, Ireland), historian & antiquary
- Diana Lebacs (1947–2022, Curaçao), ch. wr.
- Marie Leblanc (1867–1915, Mauritius), editor, nv. & translator
- Joanna Lech (b. 1984, Poland), poet & nv.
- Katherine Leckie (1860 –1930, Canada/United States), journalist, editor & suffragist
- Amalia González Caballero de Castillo Ledón (1898–1986, Mexico), es. & pw.
- Violette Leduc (1907–1972, France), nv. & autobiographer
- Andrea Lee (living, United States), nv. & mem.
- Harper Lee (1926–2016, United States), nv.; To Kill a Mockingbird
- Harriet Lee (1757–1851, England), nv. & pw.
- Lee Hye-gyeong (이혜경, 1960–2026, S. Korea), fiction wr. & poet
- Ida Lee (1865–1943, Australia), historian & poet
- Muna Lee (1895–1965, United States), poet & translator
- Sophia Lee (1750–1824, England), pw. & nv.
- Tanith Lee (1947–2015, England), nv., poet & screenwriter
- Sarah Leech (1809–1830, Ireland), poet
- Sue Lees (1941–2002, England), academic, activist, feminist & wr.
- Valentine Leeper (1900–2001, Australia), classicist & correspondent
- Alicia Le Fanu (1791–1826, Ireland), poet & fiction wr.
- Alicia Sheridan Le Fanu (1753–1817, Ireland), wr.
- Anne Charlotte Leffler (1849–1892, Sweden), fiction wr. & pw.
- Anne Brydges Lefroy (1747/8–1804, England), wr. & poet
- Joy Leftow (living, United States), poet
- Květa Legátová (1919–2012, Czechoslovakia/Czech Republic), fiction wr. & es.
- Michele Leggott (b. 1956, New Zealand), poet & academic
- Ágnes Lehóczky (b. 1976, Hungary), poet & academic
- Tuija Lehtinen (b. 1954, Finland), ch. wr. & nv.
- Leena Lehtolainen (b. 1964, Finland), crime wr.
- Nechama Leibowitz (1905–1997, Latvia/Israel), Bible scholar
- Käthe Leichter (1895–1942, Austria/Austria-Hungary), politician & economist
- Julia Leigh (b. 1970, Australia), nv. & screenwriter
- Laura Leiner (b. 1985, Hungary), YA wr.
- Anne Leinonen (b. 1973, Finland), science fiction & fantasy wr.
- Ann Tizia Leitich (1896–1976) Austria), wr. & journalist
- Mary Sinton Leitch (1876-1954, United States), wr. & poet
- Adeline Leitzbach (1884–1968, United States), pw. & screenwr.
- Vesna Lemaić (b. 1981, Yugoslavia/Slovenia), fiction wr.
- Katerina Lemmel (1466–1533, Germany), correspondent & nun
- Kimberly Lemming (living), romantic fantasy nv.
- Aïcha Lemsine (b. 1942, Algeria), nv. & activist
- Marie Lenéru (1875–1918, France), plw. & diarist
- Madeleine L'Engle (1918–2007, United States), nv. & ch. nv.
- Sue Lenier (b. 1957, England), poet & pw.
- Lalitha Lenin (b. 1946, India), poet
- Rebecca Lenkiewicz (b. 1968, England), pw.
- Ellen Lenneck (Helene Weichardt, 1851–1880, Germany), nv. & story wr.
- Anna Maria Lenngren (1754–1817, Sweden), wr. & poet
- Biddy White Lennon (1946–2017, Ireland), food wr.
- Charlotte Lennox (c. 1730–1804 United States/England), wr., poet, & pw.
- Elizabeth Emmet Lenox-Conyngham (1800 – c. 1889, Ireland), poet
- Melosina Lenox-Conyngham (1941–2011, Ireland), wr.
- Hélène Lenoir (b. 1955, France), wr.
- Conchi León (b. 1973, Mexico), wr.
- Donna Leon (b. 1942, United States), nv.
- Magdalena León de Leal (b. 1939, Colombia), non-f. wr.
- María Teresa León (1903–1988, Spain), fiction & ch. wr.
- Mae Leonard (b. c. 1940), poet, wr. & broadcaster
- Vange Leonel (1963–2014, Brazil), nv. & musician
- Marie Léopold-Lacour (1859–1942, France), feminist, journalist, wr.
- Jónína Leósdóttir (b. 1954, Iceland), nv. & pw.
- Marie Léra (1864–1958, France), journalist, nv. & translator
- Samantha Leriche-Gionet (b. 1985, Canada), animator, illustrator, & comic strip wr.
- Gerda Lerner (1920–2013, Austria/Austria-Hungary/England), pw. & non-f. wr. in English
- Yva Léro (1912–2007, Martinique), wr. & artist
- Katharyne Lescailje (1649–1711, Netherlands), poet
- Doris Leslie (1891–1982, England), nv. & biographer
- Mary Isabel Leslie (1899–1978, Ireland), nv.
- May Sybil Leslie (1887–1937, England), chemist & wr.
- Ľuba Lesná (b. 1954, Czechoslovakia/Czech Republic/Slovakia), col., nv. & pw.
- Elsie Lessa (1912–2000, Brazil), wr.
- Doris Lessing (1919–2013, England), fiction wr., poet & biographer; 2007 Nobel Prize in Literature
- Dewi Lestari (b. 1976, Indonesia), wr. & songwriter
- Lilian Leveridge (1879–1953, England/Canada), poet, ss. wr., non-f. wr.
- Rosa Leveroni (1910–1985, Spain), poet & es. in Catalan
- Ada Leverson (1862–1933, England). nv.
- Denise Levertov (1923–1997, England), US poet & es.
- Robin Levett (1925–2008, Australia), travel wr. & nv.
- Celia Moss Levetus (1819–1873, England), poet & historian
- Sonya Levien (1888–1960, Russia/United States), screenwriter
- Tanya Levin (b. 1971, Australia), non-f. wr.
- Gail Carson Levine (b. 1947, United States), YA nv.
- June Levine (1931–2008, Ireland/Canada/Newfoundland), nv. & feminist
- Olivia Levison (1847–1894, Denmark), Danish author and writer
- Sonia Levitin (b. 1934, Germany/United States), nv., ch. wr. & Hc. survivor
- Amy Levy (1861–1889, England), poet, es. & nv.
- Andrea Levy (1956–2019, England), nv.
- Deborah Levy (b. 1959, South Africa/England), pw., fiction wr. & poet
- Fanny Lewald (1811–1889, Germany), nv. & feminist
- Olive Lewin (1927–2013, Jamaica), social anthropologist & musicologist
- Alethea Lewis (1749–1827, England), nv.
- Corinth Morter Lewis (living, Belize), educator & poet
- Eiluned Lewis (1900–1979, Wales), nv. & poet
- Gwyneth Lewis (b. 1959, Wales), poet
- Hilda Lewis (1896–1974, England), historical & ch. wr.
- Janet Lewis (1899–1998, United States), nv.
- Wendy Lewis (b. 1962, Australia), non-f. wr. & pw.
- Sibylle Lewitscharoff (b. 1954, Germany), nv. & radio pw.
- Marina Lewycka (1946–2025, England), nv.
- Anne Ley (c. 1599–1641, England), wr. & polemicist
- Pauline de Lézardière (1754–1835, France), historian
- Toti Martínez de Lezea (b. 1949, Spain), nv. & ch. wr.

=== Li–Ly ===
- Li Qingzhao (李清照, fl. early 12th century, China), poet & es.
- Li Ye (李冶, died 784, China)
- Marita Liabø (b. 1971, Norway), wr.
- Liadain (fl. 7th century, Ireland), poet & nun
- Liang Desheng (梁德繩, 1771–1847, China), poet & wr.
- Mechtilde Lichnowsky (1879–1958, Germany), poet, pw. & es.
- Isabella Lickbarrow (1784–1847, England), poet
- J.S. Anna Liddiard (1773–1819, Ireland), poet
- Sara Lidman (1923–2004, Sweden), nv. & political wr.
- Lauren Liebenberg (b. 1972, Zimbabwe/South Africa), nv. in English
- Erika Liebman (1738–1803, Sweden), poet & academic
- Gemma Lienas (b. 1951, Spain), fiction & ch. wr.
- Deborah Lifchitz (1907–1942, France), linguist
- Muthoni Gachanja Likimani (b. 1926, Kenya), political wr.
- Werewere Liking (b. 1950, Cameroon/Ivory Coast), wr. & pw.
- Rosa Liksom (b. 1958, Finland), fiction & ch. wr.
- Suzanne Lilar (1901–1992, Belgium), pw., es. & nv. in French
- Irmelin Sandman Lilius (b. 1936 Finland), fiction & ch. wr. in Swedish
- Kate Lilley (b. 1960, Australia), poet & academic
- Birgitta Lillpers (b. 1958, Sweden), poet & nv.
- Hayeon Lim (임하연, b. 1993, Korea), non-f. wr. & socialite
- Margaret Lim (1947–2011, Malaysia/Canada/Newfoundland), ch. wr.
- Rossy Evelin Lima (b. 1986, Mexico/United States), poet & academic
- Lin Huiyin (林徽因, 1904–1955, China), architect & wr.
- Lin Zongsu (林宗素, 1878–1942, China), wr. & suffragist
- Olga F. Linares (1936–2014, Panama/United States), anthropologist & archaeologist
- Martha D. Lincoln (1838–?, United States), wr. & journalist
- Freda Linde (1915–2013, South Africa), ch. wr. in Afrikaans
- Gunnel Linde (1924–2014, Sweden), ch. wr.
- Johanna Dorothea Lindenaer (1664–1737, Netherlands), wr. & mem.
- Gurli Linder (1865–1947, Sweden), ch. book critic
- Madeline Linford (1895–1975), journalist & nv.
- Astrid Lindgren (1907–2002, Sweden), ch. nv.; Pippi Longstocking
- Barbro Lindgren (b. 1937, Sweden), ch. & YA wr.
- Minna Lindgren (b. 1963, Finland), col. & nv.
- Elvira Lindo (b. 1962, Spain), nv. & pw.
- Marita Lindquist (1918–2016, Finland), ch. wr. in Swedish
- Hilarie Lindsay (1922–2021, Australia), ch. & non-f. wr. & poet
- Joan A'Beckett Lindsay (1896–1984, Australia), nv.
- Rose Lindsay (1885–1978), biographer & print maker
- Eva Lindström (b. 1939, Sweden), ch. wr. & illustrator
- Merethe Lindstrøm (b. 1963, Norway), fiction wr.
- Ling Shuhua (凌叔华, 1904–1990, China), wr. & painter
- Věra Linhartová (b. 1938, Czechoslovakia/Czech Republic), wr. & art historian
- Elizabeth Linington (1921–1988, United States), nv.
- Kelly Link (b. 1968, United States), fiction wr. & editor
- Baik Sou Linne (백수린, b. 1982, Korea), fiction wr.
- Olga Lipovskaya (1954–2021, Soviet Union), poet
- Rosina Lippi (b. 1956, United States), wr.
- Laura Lippman (b. 1958, United States), crime fiction wr.
- Ewa Lipska (b. 1945, Poland), poet
- Katri Lipson (b. 1965, Finland), nv.
- Cvetka Lipuš (b. 1966, Austria/Austria-Hungary/United States), poet in Slovenian
- Henriqueta Lisboa (1901–1985, Brazil), poet
- Irene Lisboa (1892–1958, Portugal), fiction wr., poet & es.
- Helena Lisická (1930–2009, Czechoslovakia/Czech Republic), ethnographer
- Clarice Lispector (1920–1977, Ukraine/Brazil), fiction wr.
- Elisa Lispector (1911–1989, Brazil), nv.
- S. E. Lister (b. 1988, England), nv.
- Carol Liston (living, Australia), historian
- Ellen Liston (1838–1885, Australia), fiction wr. & poet
- Jessie Sinclair Litchfield (1883–1956, Australia), poet & non-f. wr.
- Lucía Lijtmaer (b. 1977, Argentina/Spain), fiction & non-f. wr.
- Angela Litschev (b. 1978, Bulgaria/Germany), poet & critic
- Linda Little (b. 1959, Canada, fiction wr.
- Heather Little-White (1952–2013, Jamaica), nutritionist & disabilities activist
- Liu Rushi (柳如是, 1618–1664, China), poet & courtesan
- Penelope Lively (b. 1933, England), nv. & ch. wr.
- Sarah White Livermore (1789–1874, United States), poet, non-f. wr., hymn wr.
- Dorothy Livesay (1909–1996, Canada/Newfoundland), poet
- Deborah Knox Livingston (1876–1923, Scotland/United States), non-f. wr.
- Aurora Ljungstedt (1821–1908, Sweden), nv.
- Eulàlia Lledó (b. 1952, Spain), philologist & critic
- Luljeta Lleshanaku (b. 1968, Albania), poet & editor
- Kate Llewellyn (b. 1936, Australia), poet, diarist & travel wr.
- Pilar Molina Llorente (b. 1943, Spain), ch. wr.
- Georgia Lloyd (1913–1999, USA), pacifist, writer
- Martha Llwyd (1766–1845, Wales), poet & hymnist
- Teresa Lo (living, United States), wr.
- Guadalupe Loaeza (b. 1946, Mexico), social wr.
- Aké Loba (1927–2012, Ivory Coast/France), wr. & politician
- Mira Lobe (1913–1995, Austria/Austria-Hungary), ch. wr.
- Joice NanKivell Loch, (1887–1982, Australia), prose wr.
- Liz Lochhead (b. 1947, Scotland), poet & pw.
- Attica Locke (b. 1974, United States), nv.
- Elsie Locke (1912–2001, New Zealand), political wr. & historian
- Gladys Edson Locke (1887-1945, United States), nv. & librarian
- Lilian Locke (1869–1950, Australia), fiction wr.
- Sumner Locke (1881–1917, Australia), fiction wr., poet & pw.
- Mary Anne Lockwood (1858–1938, Australia), ed.
- Patricia Lockwood (b. 1982, United States), poet, nv. & ess.
- Anna Rutgers van der Loeff (1910–1990, Netherlands), ch. wr.
- Amanda Lohrey (b. 1947, Australia), nv. & es.
- Mirra Lokhvitskaya (1869–1905, Russia), poet
- Lesley Lokko (b. 1964, Ghana/Gold Coast/Scotland), nv. & academic
- Joan London (1901–1971, United States), fiction wr. & biographer
- Joan London (b. 1948, Australia), fiction wr. & screenwriter
- Joan Long (1925–1999, Australia), screenwriter & producer
- Ruth Frances Long (b. 1971, Ireland), fiction & YA wr.
- Tessa de Loo (b. 1946, Netherlands), fiction wr.
- Julienne van Loon (b. 1970, Australia), nv. & non-f. wr.
- Anita Loos (1888–1981, United States), screenwriter, pw. & nv.
- Abie Longstaff (living, Australia/England), ch. wr.
- Josefina Lopez (b. 1969, United States), pw., screenwriter & nv.
- Laia Martínez i López (b. 1984, Spain), poet & musician
- Pura López Colomé (b. 1952, Mexico), poet & translator
- Angelina M. Lopez (United States), romance wr.
- Rosa María Cid López (b. 1956, Spain), geographer & historian
- Rosaura Lopez (1932–2005, Spain/United States), mem.
- Karen Lord (b. 1968, Barbados), fiction wr.
- Gabrielle Lord (b. 1946, Australia), crime wr.
- Audre Lorde (1934–1992, United States), poet
- Emilie Loring (1864–1951, United States), singer
- Marguerite St. Leon Loud (1812–1889, United States), poet & wr.
- Margracia Loudon (c.1788–1860, Ireland), novelist and political wr.
- Laura Glen Louis (living, United States), wr., poet & es.
- Regina Louise (b. 1963, United States), wr. & child advocate
- Jarmila Loukotková (1923–2007, Czechoslovakia/Czech Republic), nv.
- Anna M. Louw (1913–2003, South Africa), nv. in Afrikaans
- Jennifer LoveGrove (living, Canada), nv.
- Rosalie Loveling (1834–1875, Belgium), poet, nv. & es. in Flemish
- Virginie Loveling (1836–1923, Belgium), poet, nv. & ch. wr. in Flemish
- Mary Frances Lovell (1843–1932, England/United States), non-f. wr.
- Carolyn Lovewell (fl. 2020, United States), scholar, wr.
- Monica Lovinescu (1923–2008), fiction wr. & critic
- Trisha Low (living, United States), poet
- Helen Lowe (b. 1961, New Zealand), nv.
- Amy Lowell (1874–1925, United States), poet
- Mrs. I. Lowenberg (1845–1924, United States), nv. & essayist
- Brigid Lowry (b. 1953, New Zealand), ch. & YA wr. & poet
- Lois Lowry (b. 1937, United States), ch. wr.
- Mina Loy (1882–1966, England), poet & artist
- Dulce María Loynaz (1902–1997, Cuba), poet & nv.
- Irene Lozano (b. 1971, Spain), es. & politician
- Orietta Lozano (b. 1956, Comoros), poet
- Lü Bicheng (呂碧城, 1883–1943, China), wr., poet & activist
- Tekla Teresa Łubieńska (1767–1810, Poland), pw. & poet
- Loreen Rice Lucas (1914–2011, Canada), humorous wr. & columnist
- Melissa Lucashenko (b. 1967, Australia), fiction & non-f. wr.
- Clare Boothe Luce (1903–1987, United States), editor, pw. & col.
- Cornelia Lüdecke (b. 1954, Germany), wr. & polar researcher
- Rosario Lufrano (b. 1962, Argentina), journalist, broadcaster & reporter
- Lya Luft (1938–2021, Brazil), wr. & translator
- Eleonora Luthander (1954–2021, Sweden/Servia), poet, col. & translator
- Kristina Lugn (1948–2020, Sweden), poet & pw.
- Maria Lugones (1944–2020), Argentina), feminist philosopher, wr. & academic
- Nina Lugovskaya (1918–1993, Soviet Union/Russia), diarist & artist
- Viivi Luik (b. 1946, Estonia), poet & prose wr.
- Valeria Luiselli (b. 1983, Mexico/United States), fiction wr.
- Clotilde Luisi (1882–1969, Uruguay), lawyer & activist
- Luisa Luisi (1883–1940, Uruguay), poet & critic
- Tamara Lujak (b. 1976, Serbia), science fiction & fantasy wr.
- Mária Bajzek Lukács (b. 1960, Hungary/Slovenia), wr. on language in Slovenian
- Meilė Lukšienė (1913–2009, Austria/Austria-Hungary/Lithuania), cultural historian & educator
- Kiba Lumberg (b. 1956, Finland), screenwriter & artist
- Catharine Lumby (living, Australia), academic & col.
- Jane Lumley, Baroness Lumley (1537–1578, England), translator
- Violeta Luna (b. 1943, Ecuador), poet, es. & critic
- Ulla-Lena Lundberg (b. 1947, Finland), travel wr., nv. & poet in Swedish
- Guðrún frá Lundi (1887–1935, Iceland), fiction wr.
- Luo Luo (落落, living, China), nv. & film director
- Alison Lurie (1926–2020, United States), nv. & academic
- Marguerite de Lussan (1682–1758, France), historic fiction wr.
- Pilar de Lusarreta (1914–1967, Argentina), fiction & non-f. wr.
- Masiela Lusha (b. 1985, Albania/United States), wr. & actor
- Jadwiga Łuszczewska (1834–1908, Poland), poet & nv.
- Elizabeth Lutyens (1874–1964, England), religious wr.
- Emilie Luzac (1748–1788, Netherlands/Flanders), correspondent
- Olga Luzardo (1916–2016, Venezuela), journalist, poet & activist
- Hannah Lynch (1859–1904, Ireland), nv. & satirist
- Marta Lynch (1925–1985, Argentina), fiction wr.
- Patricia Lynch (c. 1894–1972, Ireland), ch. wr. & col.
- Philomena Lynott (1930–2019, Ireland/England), wr. & mem.
- Annabel Lyon (b. 1971, Canada/Newfoundland), fiction wr.
- Anne Bozeman Lyon (1860–1936, United States), nv., poet, ss. wr., non-f. wr.
- Elinor Lyon (1921–2008, Wales/England), ch. wr.
- Enid Lyons (1897–1981, Australia), biographer & politician
- Genevieve Lyons (1930–2018, Ireland/England), nv.
- Edith Joan Lyttleton (1873–1945, Australia/New Zealand), nv.

== See also ==
- Feminist literary criticism
- Feminist science fiction
- Feminist theory
- Gender in science fiction
- List of biographical dictionaries of female writers
- List of early-modern British women novelists
- List of early-modern British women playwrights
- List of early-modern British women poets
- List of female detective/mystery writers
- List of female poets
- List of women cookbook writers
- List of feminist literature
- List of female rhetoricians
- List of women hymn writers
- Norton Anthology of Literature by Women
- Women in science fiction
- Women Writers Project
- Women's writing in English
- Sophie (digital lib)
