= List of Algerian writers =

This is a list of notable Algerian writers:

== A ==
- Ferhat Abbas (1899–1985), political leader and essayist^{[Gikandi]}
- Saïda Abouba (born 1963), novelist, poet and translator
- Nora Aceval (born 1953), folk story writer
- Mohamed Aïchaoui (1921–1959), political leader and journalist^{[Gikandi]}
- Salim Aïssa, pseudonym of Boukella, writer of detective fiction^{[Gikandi]}
- Fadhma Aït Mansour (c.1882–1967), autobiographer
- Wasini al-A'raj (1954– ), novelist and short story writer^{[Gikandi]}
- Atif Ali (1984– )
- Abdelkader Alloula (1939–1994)
- Abderrazak Belagrouz (1981– ), writer and scholar
- Malek Alloula (1937–2015), poet and critic^{[Gikandi]}
- Djoher Amhis-Ouksel (1928–2025), writer in French and Berber
- Djamal Amrani (1935–2005), poet and essayist^{[Gikandi]}
- Jean Amrouche (1907–1962), poet^{[Gikandi]}
- Marguerite Taos Amrouche (1913–1976), writer and singer^{[Gikandi]}
- Leila Aouchal (1937–2013), novelist^{[Gikandi]}
- Apuleius (c. 124 – after 170)
- Mohammed Arkoun (1928–2010)
- Maya Arriz Tamza (1957– ), storyteller, novelist and playwright^{[Gikandi]}
- Augustine of Hippo (354–430)
- Zighen Aym (1957– )

== B ==
- Yamina Bachir (1954–2022), screenwriter, film director
- Fatima Bakhaï (1949– )^{[Gikandi]}
- Ouarda Baziz Chérifi, poet and novelist
- Azouz Begag (1957– ), social scientist and novelist^{[Gikandi]}
- Rabah Belamri (1946–1995), poet, short story writer and critic^{[Gikandi]}
- Farida Belghoul (1958– )
- Omar Belhouchet (1954– )
- Samira Bellil (1972–2004), Algerian-born French feminist, author of the autobiographical Dans l'enfer des tournantes
- Nassira Belloula (born 1961), feminist journalist, novelist, poet, writing in French
- Myriam Ben (1928–2001), novelist, poet and activist^{[Gikandi]}
- 'Abdelhamid Ben Hadouga (1928–1996), novelist and short story writer^{[Gikandi]}
- Latifa Ben Mansour (1950– ), writer and linguist
- Mohammed Benchicou (1952– )
- Nouria Benghabrit-Remaoun (born 1952), sociologist, politician, non-fiction writer
- Khadija Benguenna (born 1965), journalist, Al Jazeera television presenter
- Berthe Bénichou-Aboulker (1888–1942), first Jewish woman to be published in Algeria
- Salah Benlabed (1950– )
- Malek Bennabi (1905–1973)
- Jacqueline Benslimane, poet^{[Gikandi]}
- Réda Bensmaia, novelist and critic^{[Gikandi]}
- Albert Bensoussan, novelist, translator and academic^{[Gikandi]}
- Fatiha Berezak, poet and performer^{[Gikandi]}
- Maïssa Bey (born 1950), educator, short story writer, novelist
- Zoubeida Bittari (1939– )
- Yve-Alain Bois (1952– )
- Aïcha Bouabaci, poet and short story writer^{[Gikandi]}
- Rachid Boudjedra (1941– ), writer and educator^{[Gikandi]}
- Nina Bouraoui (1967– ), novelist^{[Gikandi]}
- Hocine Bouzaher (1935– ), poet, politician and editor^{[Gikandi]}

== C ==
- Albert Camus (1913–1960)
- Martianus Capella (410–420 CE)
- Marie Cardinal (1929–2001), best selling novelist, film actress
- Mehdi Charef (1952– )
- Mohamed Cherak (1977–2018), journalist
- Corinne Chevallier (1935– ), historian and novelist
- Lynda Chouiten (fl. from 2012), French-language writer, educator
- Hélène Cixous (1937– ), feminist writer and critic

== D ==
- Abraham Daninos, wrote the first play in Arabic (in 1847)
- Kamel Daoud (1970– ), journalist and writer
- Djamila Debèche (1926–2010), novelist and essayist^{[Gikandi]}
- Jacques Derrida (1930–2004), philosopher
- Mohammed Dib (1920–2003), novelist and poet^{[Gikandi]} ^{[Killam & Rowe]}
- Leila Djabali (born 1933), poet
- Tahar Djaout (1954–1993), journalist, poet and fiction writer^{[Gikandi]}
- Assia Djebar (1936–2015), Francophone writer, film-maker and academic^{[Gikandi]} ^{[Killam & Rowe]}
- Rabia Djelti (born 1954), poet, novelist, writing in Arabic

== F ==
- Nabile Farès (1940–2016)
- Fadhila El Farouk (1967– )
- Achour Fenni, poet and academic
- Mouloud Feraoun (1913–1962)^{[Gikandi]}
- Omar Fetmouche (1955– ), artist

== G ==
- Fatima Gallaire (1944–2020), playwright^{[Gikandi]}
- Salima Ghezali (1958– )
- François Giuliani (1938–2009)
- Anna Greki, pseudonym of Colette Anna Grégoire (1931–1966), poet^{[Gikandi]}
- Faïza Guène (1985– )

== H ==
- Malek Haddad (1927–1978), novelist and poet^{[Gikandi]}
- Mimi Hafida (born 1965), poet, journalist, visual artist
- Mohamed Harbi (1933–2026)
- Abdelkader Harichane (1953– ), journalist and writer
- Mohamed Hassaïne (1945–1994), journalist
- Zehira Houfani (born 1952), French-language writer

== K ==
- Naget Khadda, literary scholar
- Yasmina Khadra (1955– )
- Aïssa Khelladi

== L ==
- Djanet Lachmet
- Marnia Lazreg (1941–2024), academic and writer on women in the Muslim world
- Aicha Lemsine (1942– ), novelist^{[Gikandi]}

== M ==
- Ahmed Mahsas (1923–2013), political leader and sociologist^{[Gikandi]}
- Mouloud Mammeri (1917–1989), Kabyle writer, anthropologist and linguist^{[Gikandi]}
- Leïla Marouane (1960– )
- Yamina Méchakra (1949–2013), novelist
- Fodil Mezali (1959– ), journalist and writer
- Hocine Mezali (1938– ), journalist and writer
- Rachid Mimouni (1945–1995), writer, teacher and activist^{[Gikandi]}
- Mohamed Missouri (1947–2015), writer, boxer and coach
- Ahmed Mohammed al-Maqqari (1578–1632)
- Si Mohand (1848–1905)
- Malika Mokeddem (1949– )
- Elaine Mokhtefi (1928–2026), translator and writer
- Ahlam Mostaghanemi (1953– ), novelist^{[Gikandi]}

== N ==
- Samira Negrouche (born 1980), medical doctor, poet

== O ==
- Mohammed Ould Cheikh (1905–1938), poet and novelist^{[Gikandi]}

== R ==
- Pierre Rabhi (1938–2021)
- Zahia Rahmani (born 1962), author and art historian
- Leila Rezzoug (1956– ), novelist^{[Gikandi]}
- Sarah Rivens (1999– )
- Emmanuel Roblès (1914–1995)

== S ==
- Boualem Sansal (1949– ) novelist
- Leïla Sebbar (1941– ), novelist^{[Gikandi]}
- Jean Sénac (1926–1962), poet^{[Gikandi]}
- Othmane Senadjki (1959–2010), journalist
- Benjamin Stora (1950– )

== T ==
- Zoulikha Tahar (1992– ), poet
- Wassyla Tamzali (1941– )
- Habib Tengour (1947– )
- Fettouma Touati (1950– ), Francophone novelist of the Maghreb^{[Killam & Rowe]}

== W ==
- Zuhur Wanasi (born 1936), Arabic-language short story writer, journal editor, politician
- al-Tāhir Wattar (1936–2010), novelist^{[Gikandi]}
- Maryse Wolinski (1943–2021), Algerian-born French journalist, novelist

== Y ==
- Kateb Yacine (1929–1989), novelist and playwright^{[Gikandi]}

== Z ==
- Moufdi Zakaria (1908–1977)
- Fatma Zohra Zamoum (born 1967), writer, filmmaker, educator
- Salem Zenia (1962– )
- Mohammed Chaouki Zine (1972– )
- Ahmed Zitouni (1949–2024), novelist^{[Gikandi]}
- Hafsa Zinaï Koudil (born 1951), novelist and journalist

== See also ==
- List of Algerian women writers
- List of African writers
