= List of Algerian women writers =

This is a list of women writers who were born in Algeria or whose writings are closely associated with that country.

== A ==
- Saïda Abouba (born 1963), novelist, poet and translator
- Nora Aceval (born 1953), folk story writer
- Fadhma Aït Mansour (c.1882–1967), autobiographer
- Djoher Amhis-Ouksel (1928–2025), writer in French and Berber
- Taos Amrouche (1913–1976), novelist, singer, first Algerian woman to publish a novel
- Leïla Aouchal (1936–2013), French-born Algerian writer, autobiographer

== B ==
- Yamina Bachir (1954–2022), screenwriter, film director
- Ouarda Baziz Chérifi, poet and novelist
- Samira Bellil (1972–2004), Algerian-born French feminist, author of the autobiographical Dans l'enfer des tournantes
- Nassira Belloula (born 1961), feminist journalist, novelist, poet, writing in French
- Myriam Ben (1928–2001), activist, novelist, poet, and painter.
- Latifa Ben Mansour (born 1950), novelist, playwright, short story writer, linguist
- Nouria Benghabrit-Remaoun (born 1952), sociologist, politician, non-fiction writer
- Khadija Benguenna (born 1965), journalist, Al Jazeera television presenter
- Berthe Bénichou-Aboulker (1888–1942), first Jewish woman to be published in Algeria
- Maïssa Bey (born 1950), educator, short story writer, novelist
- Zoubeida Bittari (1939– )
- Nina Bouraoui (1967– ), novelist

== C ==
- Marie Cardinal (1929–2001), best selling novelist, film actress
- Corinne Chevallier (born 1935), historian, novelist
- Lynda Chouiten (fl. from 2012), French-language writer, educator
- Hélène Cixous (born 1937), educator, novelist, poet, playwright, philosopher, critic, feminist writer

== D ==
- Djamila Debèche (1926–2010), novelist and journalist
- Leila Djabali (born 1933), poet
- Assia Djebar, pen name of Fatima-Zohra Imalayen (1936–2015), novelist, translator, filmmaker
- Rabia Djelti (born 1954), poet, novelist, writing in Arabic

== F ==
- Fadhila El Farouk (born 1967), journalist, novelist

== G ==
- Fatima Gallaire (1944–2020), Franco-Algerian playwright, short story writer
- Salima Ghezali (born 1958), acclaimed journalist, women's rights activist
- Anna Gréki (1931–1966), poet
- Faïza Guène (1985– )

== H ==
- Mimi Hafida (born 1965), poet, journalist, visual artist
- Zehira Houfani (born 1952), French-language writer

== K ==
- Naget Khadda, literary scholar

== L ==
- Djanet Lachmet (born 1948), novelist and actress
- Marnia Lazreg (1941–2024), academic and writer on women in the Muslim world
- Aïcha Lemsine (born 1942), French-language writer and women's rights activist

== M ==
- Leïla Marouane (born 1960), journalist, creative writer
- Yamina Méchakra (1949–2013), novelist
- Malika Mokeddem (born 1949), acclaimed novelist
- Elaine Mokhtefi (1928–2026), translator and writer
- Ahlam Mosteghanemi (born 1953), poet, novelist, most widely read female Arabic-language writer

== N ==
- Samira Negrouche (born 1980), medical doctor, poet

== R ==
- Zahia Rahmani (born 1962), author and art historian
- Sarah Rivens (1999– )

== S ==
- Leïla Sebbar (born 1941), novelist, essayist, travel writer, critic, short story writer, educator

== T ==
- Zoulikha Tahar (1992– ), poet
- Wassyla Tamzali (born 1941), lawyer, non-fiction feminist writer
- Fettouma Touati (born 1950), novelist

== W ==
- Zuhur Wanasi (born 1936), Arabic-language short story writer, journal editor, politician
- Maryse Wolinski (1943–2021), Algerian-born French journalist, novelist

== Z ==
- Fatma Zohra Zamoum (born 1967), writer, filmmaker, educator
- Hafsa Zinaï Koudil (born 1951), novelist and journalist

== See also ==
- List of women writers
- List of Algerian writers
