= Amèle El Mahdi =

Algerian writer, professor of mathematics

- آمال المهدي
- Born: 1956 (age 69–70); Blida, Algeria
- Occupations: Mathematics professor, writer

Amèle El Mahdi, born in 1956 in Blida, is an Algerian professor of mathematics and writer. She lived in many of the cities in southern Algeria, which inspired many of her writings. She has written for the Algerian newspaper El Watan. Her debut novel, La Belle et le Poète (2012), was shortlisted for the first-novel prize at the 2013 Escales littéraires d'Alger, organised by the Sofitel Algiers Hamma with the European Union delegation in Algeria; the award went to Sarah Haider's Virgules en trombe.

== Literary works ==
- The Beauty and the Poet, Algiers, Casbah Editions, 2012, 187 p.
- Yamsel, son of the Ahaggar, Algiers, Casbah Editions, 2014, 275 p.
- Tin Hinan, My Queen, Algiers, Casbah Editions, 2014, 141 p.
- Grandma's Beautiful Stories, Algiers, Casbah Editions, 2015
- Under the flag of Raïs, Algiers, Casbah Editions, 2016
- An African odyssey. The tragedy of illegal migration, Algiers, Casbah Editions, 2018, 172 p.
- A collective work entitled Hiziya My Love with texts by 14 novelists and poets (Amar Achour, Nassira Belloula, Maïssa Bey, Aicha Bouabaci, Slimane Djouadi, Saléha Imekraz, Abdelmadjid Kaouah, Azzedine Menasra, Miloud Khaizar, Fouzia Laradi, Amèle El Mahdi, Arezki Metref, Lazhari Labter, Smail Yabrir), Hibr Editions.
- Oasis: yesterday's images, today's views; a collective work supported by the publication program of the French Institute of Algeria. Chihab Editions, 2018
