= Djabali =

Djabali is a surname. Notable people with the surname include:

- Hawa Djabali, Algerian playwright, screenwriter, and writer
- Leila Djabali (born 1933), Algerian intellectual and poet
