= Yamina Méchakra =

Algerian novelist and psychiatrist

- Born: 1949; Meskiana
- Died: May 19, 2013 (aged 63–64); Algiers
- Education: University of Algiers
- Writing career
- Genres: Fiction, psychiatry

Yamina Méchakra (1949 in Meskiana – 2013 in Algiers) was an Algerian novelist and psychiatrist.

== Early life ==
Méchakra was born in 1949 in Meskiana in northern Aures. At age nine, she began writing; taking notes in a "log-book" that grew over time. Two events profoundly marked her childhood: her father was tortured by the French during the Algerian Civil War before her eyes, exposed in the street, attached to the barrel of a tank. Little more is known of her life, although Kateb Yacine wrote in the preface to her book that she had a "cruel and troubled life". (Note: Kateb Yacine wrote the preface of La Grotte éclatée, and told that Méchakra dedicated the novel to her father as he writes: "She was born on the eve of the insurrection. When she hears talk of war, for the first time, she thinks it is a storm. In popular Arabic, ‘guirra’, means both a storm and revolutionary war, an unleashing of nature.")

== Career ==
Méchakra began writing her first novel in 1973, while studying psychiatry at the University of Algiers. Her university thesis in literature was devoted to Apuleius of Madaurus. (Note: She wrote one novella as her narrative entitled "L'éveil du mont" published in 1976 in "al-Mujāhid al-thaqāfī" or "el-Moudjahid culturel". In 1999, her novel Arris: romanin was published, as a book and as a literature in Algérie Littérature/Action.) In Algiers, she met Kateb Yacine before his departure for Rome and Paris. Yamina Méchakra followed Yachine's style in writing, who gave her extended advice and guidance. She needed to rewrite three times to finish her first book, and "La Grotte éclatée" was published in 1979. Yamina Mechakra argued that women was the source of the nation and the founding of an independent state. Referring to the Berber queen known as La Kahina (Note: The Berber queen known as La Kahina is the pioneering woman as a heroic warrior in Algeria, who fought against Arab invaders in the eighth century A.D.), Kateb Yacine titled his preface of the novel as The Children of Kahina.

While she continued to write during the succeeding years, but did not publish, confiding to a reporter that she lost her manuscripts. In 1997, when she treated a young boy as a psychiatrist, she was inspired writing her second novel Arris, which was published in 1999. Yamina Mechakra is also a committed author who supported the importance of a cultural revolution in Algeria in the process of decolonization.

== Death ==
She died in Algiers on May 19, 2013, at the age of 64, following a long illness. On May 20, 2013, a memorial was held at the Palace of Culture, and she was buried the same day in the cemetery of Sidi Yahia.

== Yamina Mechakra Prize ==
The Yamina Mechakra Literary Prize is an Algerian literary award established in 2018 in tribute to Mechakra. It aims to promote Algerian women's literature and rewards works written by women authors in Arabic, Tamazight (Amazigh), or French. The first edition was held in January 2019. The prize was first announced in September 2018 by the Algerian Ministry of Culture and officially launched during the annual meetings of the “Mediterranean-Africa Meeting of Young Women Writers” (RAMAJE). The first award ceremony took place in January 2019 at the Palais de la culture Moufdi-Zakaria in Algiers. The prize aims to promote Algerian women's writing in one of the two national languages: Arabic or Tamazight, in addition to French. The winners are selected by an all-female jury. For the first edition, the chairs by language were Rabia Djelti (Arabic), Maïssa Bey (French), and Lynda Koudache (Amazigh).

For the first edition, each laureate received a reward of 500,000 Algerian dinars. The first ceremony was held at the Moufdi-Zakaria Palace of Culture in Algiers, in the presence of the then Minister of Culture, Azzedine Mihoubi. The known laureates are:

Year	Language	Laureate	Work	Notes
2019	Arabic	Djamila Talbaoui	Qalb El Isbani	—
2019	French	Hédia Bensahli	Orages	—
2019	Tamazight	Kayssa Khalifi	Ihulfan	Awarded posthumously

== Works ==
- Mechakra, Yamina. "Ecrire femme" [Writing Woman]. Expressions algériennes (in French): 44–47. OCLC 949070766.
- La Grotte éclatée [The Exploded Cave] (in French). series: Lettres du Sud. Alger: SNED. 1979. OCLC 464501613.
- Arris: roman (in French). Paris: Marsa. 1999. ASIN B0046U4KYM. OCLC 44479653.
- Arris: roman, suivi du supplément collectif [Arris: Novel, followed by collective supplement] (in French). series: Algérie littérature/action. Paris: Marsa. 2000. OCLC 948996415.
