= Mimi Hafida =

Algerian poet and artist (born 1965)

- حفيظة ميمي
- Born: 26 August 1965 (age 60); Batna, Algeria
- Education: Economic and Financial Sciences from the University of Batna
- Occupations: Journalist, writer, sculptor
- Known for: Radio broadcasting, children's protection campaign
- Notable work: Aurasian Stories (Hikayat Aurassia / حكايا أوراسية) - (2011). It is Forbidden to Pick the Children (Mamnu' Qatf al-Atfal / ممنوع قطف الأطفال). Children’s Theater Collection (1994). Taâbir.
- Awards: Prix Mohammed Dib (2011). First National Prize for Children’s Theater (1994). Abdelhamid Benhadouga Prize (2006). Mediterranean Women’s Forum (2003).

Mimi Hafida (born 26 August 1965), also referred to as Mimi Hafidha and known by the pseudonym "Mimi the Cat Cartoon," is a prominent Algerian visual artist, sculptor, writer, and journalist. Based in Batna, she is a leading cultural voice of the Aurès region, recognized for her long-standing career as a producer and presenter for Radio Aurès.

Hafida’s multifaceted work explores the cultural identity of the Chaoui people and reflects the social trauma of the Algerian Black Decade, particularly its impact on children. In 2011, she was awarded the Prix Mohammed Dib (4th session) for her literary collection "Hikayat Aurassia" (Tales of the Aurès).

In the visual arts, she is a pioneer of assemblage sculpture in Algeria; she is internationally recognized for her woman-shaped figure constructed from thousands of safety pins and a handful of other artworks dedicated to women's strength. For Hafida, these pins serve as a powerful metaphor for "stitching together" a fragmented identity and healing historical wounds. Her contributions to Algerian media and fine arts were nationally honored in 2008 with the Distinguished Women Award.

== Early life ==
=== Roots and regional context ===
Mimi Hafida was born and raised in Batna, the capital of the Aurès region and the fifth-largest city in Algeria. Historically, Batna serves as the heart of the Chaoui identity, a mountainous area known for its fierce resistance and distinct Berber (Amazigh) traditions.

Growing up in the Batna Wilaya significantly shaped Hafida’s artistic vision and established the future motifs of her creative aspirations. The region functioned as a cultural buffer zone, bridging traditional urban life with the ancestral heritage of the nearby Aurès mountains. During the Algerian Black Decade, these mountains became a site of guerrilla ambushes, an experience that left a lasting impression on Hafida. This period later inspired her to create specialized media programs based on her literary work, specifically aimed at condemning violence and its devastating consequences on children and women as the most vulnerable category.

For Hafida, the Aurès was not merely a place of residence but a source of spiritual geography, where the vibrant colors, tribal patterns, and the resilient spirit of the Chaoui people became the core of her expression. Her residence in Batna remained a permanent pillar of her professional life, as she later centered her media career within the same locality at Radio Aurès.

=== Family and heritage ===
Hafida’s family background is rooted in the local intellectual and social elite of the Batna region, providing her with a supportive environment for her multidisciplinary development. This connection to the regional aristocracy facilitated her early access to formal education and granted her a degree of intellectual and creative freedom that was uncommon for the time. She grew up in a close-knit household alongside her brothers, Merouane and Zaki, and her sister, Lillia Akham.

The strong familial bond and its impact on her life are documented in the academic work of her sister, Lillia Akham, titled "Mémoire de fin de cycle" (2020). In the dedications of this work, Hafida is described as a constant source of emotional support and a figure who helped restore confidence during difficult times. Additionally, the family legacy is linked to their aunt, Hafida, for whom Mimi was likely named, suggesting a lineage of influential women who shaped her identity. This connection to a distinguished family status not only provided social standing but also reinforced her lifelong commitment to representing the Chaoui heritage.

=== Early artistic development ===
Hafida Mimi is a multilingual scholar and creator, proficient in Arabic, French, and English. While she holds a degree in Economic and Financial Sciences from the University of Batna, her intellectual path has always been intertwined with literature and social activism. Her ability to write and create in multiple languages allowed her to bridge the gap between local Algerian issues and a broader international audience.

== Career and professional activities ==
=== Journalism and media ===
Hafida Mimi built a distinguished career in Algerian media, working across print, radio, and television. She contributed as a journalist to several notable newspapers, including En Nasr, La Semaine des Aurès, and La Lettre de l’Atlas.

Her influence extended to broadcasting at Radio Batna, where she hosted numerous cultural programs. She produced and directed a television series focused on the history and development of plastic arts in Algeria, documenting the country’s visual heritage for a national audience.

=== Literary contributions and awards ===
Mimi is a celebrated figure in Algerian literature, particularly known for her short stories and children’s literature, which often feature naïve and abstract illustrations. Her writing serves as a historical testimony of the Aurès region, exploring themes that span from ancient historical disruptions to modern social transformations. Her major literary achievements include:

- Prix Mohammed Dib (2011): Awarded for her collection "Aurasian Stories" (حكايا أوراسية). This is one of Algeria's most prestigious literary honors.
- First National Prize for Children’s Theater (1994).
- Abdelhamid Benhadouga Prize (2006): For her excellence in short story writing.
- International Recognition: In 2003, she won the first prize from the Mediterranean Women’s Forum in France for one of her short stories.

=== Cultural leadership and affiliations ===
Beyond her creative work, Mimi has held leadership roles in Algeria's cultural institutions. She served as the Director of Publication for "Taâbir", a cultural journal edited by the House of Culture in Batna. She is an active member of several professional organizations:

- The National Union of Cultural Arts (UNAC)
- The Union of Algerian Writers
- Prisma Association (Batna), where she contributed to the local artistic movement.

Mimi is a proactive voice on social media, particularly on Facebook and Twitter (X).She has dedicated a significant portion of her digital presence to children's advocacy. On her Facebook platform, she created a specialized page for her children’s collections, where she established a "club" to promulgate support for children and encourage creative engagement among the youth.

== Art legacy ==
Mimi’s visual art is characterized by a strong focus on the domestic and social roles of women. She rejects traditional sculpting materials, such as clay, in favor of assemblage and found objects, including cardboard, wood branches, and her signature safety pins.

Her famous sculptures of women, crafted entirely from safety pins, represent the projected strength and safety of women. In this context, the safety pin serves as a metaphor for healing and holding together a family, a society, or a nation.

In her works, women are depicted in various states - from mothers with children to modern figures without the traditional hijab. This diversity reflects her vision of Algerian identity: rooted in tradition but striving for personal and intellectual freedom. Furthermore, she incorporates Auresian motifs and symbols like the Hand of Fatima (Hamsa), blending North African tribal aesthetics with contemporary abstraction.

Mimi’s art is inseparable from her political conscience. Her primary aspirations include the protection of children’s rights and the recognition of women as liberated individuals. War, as a central antagonist in her work, unites her creative output on an international level.

A poignant example is her poetry regarding the tragedies in Lebanon and Beirut, which serves as a protest against the impact of warfare on women and children. Through her creative platform, she expresses Pan-Arab solidarity, portraying war as a destructive force that shatters the innocence of society.

== Selected works and exhibitions ==
=== Publications ===
Her literary career is marked by a focus on heritage and the psychological impact of conflict on children.

1. Aurasian Stories (Hikayat Aurassia / حكايا أوراسية) — (2011). A short story collection that earned her the prestigious Prix Mohammed Dib. The work is celebrated for its preservation of oral traditions and local folklore.
2. It is Forbidden to Pick the Children (Mamnu' Qatf al-Atfal / ممنوع قطف الأطفال) — A dedicated book for children addressing themes of safety and protection.
3. Children’s Theater Collection (1994) — A series of plays that received the First National Prize for Children’s Theater, highlighting her early commitment to youth advocacy.
4. Taâbir — Served as the Director of Publication for this cultural journal edited by the House of Culture in Batna, documenting the regional intellectual movement.

=== Exhibitions ===
Mimi has participated in numerous solo and collective exhibitions across Algeria and abroad:

1. Solo Exhibitions: Batna (2010).
2. Collective Exhibitions:
  1. Algiers: 2004, 2005, 2006, 2007, 2008, 2013 (including the "4th National Festival of Female Creation").
  2. Batna: 1989, 2003, 2007.
  3. Constantine: 2004.
  4. Annaba: 2006.
  5. Khenchela: 2004.
