= Sarah Rivens =

Algerian writer

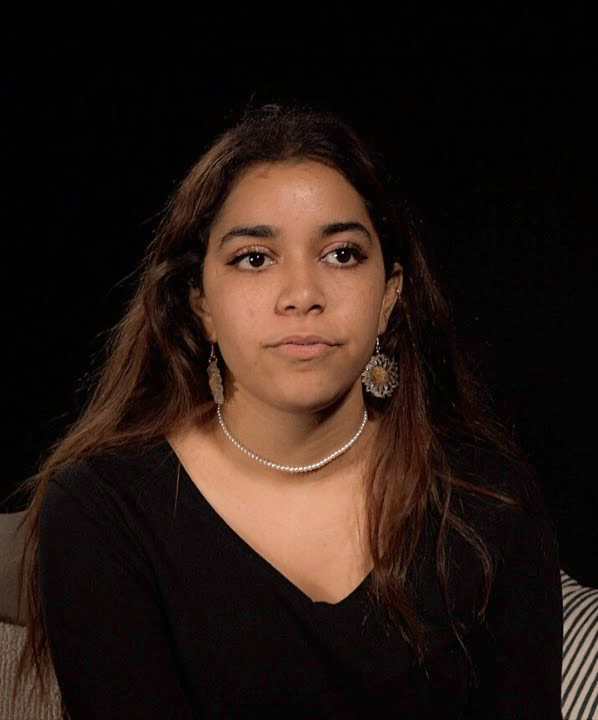
- Rivens in 2022
- Born: 19 December 1998 (age 27); Algiers, Algeria

Sarah Rivens (in Arabic: سارة ريفنز) is an Algerian writer born on 19 December 1998 in Algiers.

As of early 2023, Rivens was the best-selling author in France through her series "Captive". She is currently the most read Algerian author in its history, with nine million reads.

== Biography ==
In 2019, Rivens published her writing on Wattpad and gained recognition on social media.

=== Captive ===
Rivens became popular with her Captive series, which was initially published on Wattpad under the pseudonym "theblurredgirl" in late 2020 and early 2021 during the COVID-19 pandemic. The series was popular on TikTok with the hashtag #captivewattpad, generating 9 million views on the platform.

Rivens is signed with publishers Hlab. The Captive trilogy has been translated into 9 languages and sold approximately 300,000 copies in physical and 50,000 in digital. As of April 2023, sales continued at a pace of over 5,000 copies per week.

== Publications ==
- Lakestone.
- Captive - tome 1. Hachette Lab. 8 June 2022. ISBN 978-2017206934.
- Captive 1.5 - Perfectly Wrong. Hachette Lab. 2 November 2022. ISBN 978-2017206941.
- Captive - tome 2. Hachette Lab. 7 December 2022. ISBN 978-2017206958.
- Captive - tome 2 Bonus. Hachette Lab. 9 December 2022.

== See also ==
- List of Algerian writers
- Algerian literature
