= Zighen Aym =

Algerian writer and engineer

Zighen Aym (born 1957 in Kabylie in Algeria) is an Algerian writer and engineer. After graduating with an engineering degree in the United States in 1982, he went back to his native Algeria and worked as a maintenance engineer in the Sahara for Sonatrach, the Algerian National Oil and Gas Company. He returned to the US in 1990 to pursue graduate studies and obtained a PhD in Mechanical Engineering.

In his first book Still Moments: A Story about Faded Dreams and Forbidden Pictures, he writes of his experience of ethnic profiling in the aftermath of 9/11. Zighen stopped along Route 66 to photograph the railroad tracks one day in October 2002. An Illinois State Police officer stopped and questioned him, asking for identification and what he was doing. What followed several months later was an FBI interrogation. The reader experiences Zighen's reflections on his life in Algeria, his move to the United States, his reaction to being suspected of terrorist activities in the innocence of a photography hobby, the ethnic profiling he experienced and the traumatic FBI interrogation.

== Works ==
- "ALGERIA'S AMNESTY AND THE KABYLIA QUESTION", World War 4 Report, Nov. 1, 2005
- "Cultural Apartheid in North Africa", The Amazigh Voice, December 1995
- Still Moments: A Story about Faded Dreams and Forbidden Pictures, 2005 (ISBN 978-0-9765998-0-7)

== Reviews ==
In his review of Still Moments, Irfan Yusuf wrote

Aym’s book provides a context to the Algerian conflict rarely discussed by Muslimphobic pundits and supporters of political Islamist groups such as the Algerian FIS. Aym provides us with a glimpse of how many ordinary Algerians viewed the political situation in their country – critical of the incumbent FLN regime’s corruption and despotism but ill-disposed to ex-FLN officials who aligned themselves with a modernist form of political Islam.
