= Aïssa Khelladi =

Algerian journalist, novelist, playwright, and poet

Aïssa Khelladi is an Algerian journalist, novelist, playwright, and poet who has published books on the rise of Islamic fundamentalism, plays, poetry, and several novels, most notably Peurs et Mensonges and Rose d'abime. Both of these novels deal with the situation in contemporary Algeria. He is also the director of the new review Algérie Littérature/Action.

== Life ==
Aïssa Khelladi was born in Algeria in 1953, right before the beginning of the Algerian war for Independence fought between the Algerian National Liberation Front (F.L.N.) and the French government. He began attending Koranic school at a young age before attending primary and secondary school in Algiers before dropping out to support his family once his schooling was no longer mandatory.

He then took a baccalaureate exam before continuing his education at the University of Algiers, earning a BA and a DEA (Diplôme d'études approfondies, which is equivalent to a master's degree)) in psychology after receiving a grant from the Algerian Ministry of Defense. After earning his degree, he wrote two books between 1981 and 1984, “Attende et Journal” and a collection of short stories.

In 1988, he was discharged from the army after attaining the rank of captain and shifted his focused solely to his writing. This devotion to journalism and literature lead him to aid in the creation and launch of Hebdo News in 1990. His writing for that paper culminated in a condemnation of the Islamic Salvation Front (F.I.S.) by another newspaper, Ennour. Shortly afterward, Khelladi published an essay titled “Les Islamistes Algeriens Face Au Pouvoir” (“Algerian Islamists in the face of Power”), digging into the religious agendas of the F.L.N. and F.I.S. Subsequently, “Les Islamistes Algeriens Face Au Pouvoir” was banned by the Algerian government and Khelladi fled the country after a failed assassination attempt. He was granted political asylum in France, where he continued his career.

While in France, he published another novel, titled “Peurs et Mensonges” (“Fears and Lies”) in 1996. In the same year, Khelladi founded the magazine Algérie Littérature/Action alongside Marie Virolle. While still in France, he published two novels in 1998, “Rose d’Abime” and “Spolaition”. He has since returned to Algeria to focus on publishing and is currently working on another novel.

== Literary/Journalism Work ==
=== Les Islamistes Algeriens Face Au Pouvoir ===
This novel focuses on the F.I.S. and F.L.N. and the effect their Islam agenda had on the country of Algeria. Khelladi's claim in “Les Islamistes Algeriens face au pouvoir” is that the F.L.N. was consumed by a religious agenda that pushed its incompetent leaders to make up for their failures by forcing Islam on the people of Algeria. He concedes that while the F. I. S. did not have a concrete plan, they still were able to spread their ideology throughout the people of Algeria.

=== Peurs et Mensonages ===
Peurs et Mensonages is a fictional novel that follows a journalist by the name of Amine Touati as he grips the conflict of violence and counter-violence in his country and well as the very ideologies that form the foundations for his work and the actions, he sees every day. The novel takes place in prison, where Touati is tasked with confessing and will thus be rewarded with exile.

=== Algérie Littérature/ Action ===
After fleeing from the Algerian government in 1994, Khelladi became a political refugee in France, where he continued in literary and journalistic career. This led him to, in 1996, start Algérie Littérature/Action alongside Marie Virolle in her apartment with two thousand francs (~US$300). Then began by publishing articles by close friends and themselves, including Khelladi's “Peurs et Mensonges”.

Over time, they gained recognition and respect from writers and the mainstream audience and began received more high-quality submissions to consider for publication. Once they had “proven themselves” they received financial backing from Centre National du Livre (CNL) and the Fond's d'Action (FAS) as well as more mainstream media attention from radio shows, television and newspaper.

AL/A was published in a single volume at a time, usually 200-300 pages long that featured a novel followed by cultural publications such as biographies, literary criticisms and short stories. This structure was adapted primarily for publishing reasons, as it had to be considered a periodical in order for Virolle and Khelladi to start publishing with so little money. However, they also wanted this structure in order to not prioritize one type of writing over the other, opting to create an anthology of multiple types of Algerian literature. The publishing house behind AL/A, Marsa Publishing, is now located in both Paris and Algeria, with the publishing centralized in Paris but most of the works coming from Algeria and other places around the globe.
