= Leïla Marouane =

Tunisian-born French creative writer and journalist (1960–2026)

- ليلى مروان
- Born: Leyla Zineb Mechentel; 1960; Djerba, Tunisia
- Died: 8 April 2026 (aged 65); Paris, France
- Citizenship: Tunisia
- Occupations: Author, journalist, creative writer
- Employers: Horizons; El Watan
- Notable work: La Boutique; La Fille de la casbah; Ravisseur

Leïla Marouane (1960 – 8 April 2026) was a Tunisian-born French Algerian journalist and creative writer. Leïla Marouane is a pseudonym; her full name is Leyla Zineb Mechentel. She was an author of novels and short fiction which have received a number of awards within the French-language literature community.

== Life and career ==
Leyla Z. Mechentel was born in Djerba, Tunisia in 1960, to a family living there in exile. The family moved to Biskra, and they lived there until she was six, when they moved to Algiers. She lived there until her exile from Algeria to Paris in 1991.

She became a journalist after her college studies were interrupted in Algiers, working for Horizons and El Watan. She later wrote for Politis and Jeune Afrique, as well as the German-language press. In 1995, she attended Paris 8 University to finish her schooling. There she completed a creative writing degree, under the novelist Paul Fournel. Her debut novel, La fille de la Casbah (in English The Daughter of the Kasbah), was published by Éditions Julliard; in 1996. Since, she has published a number of novels. Her first novel translated or published in English was her 1998 Ravisseur, translated into English, as "The Abductor".

Marouane was also the founder of La Boutique (est. 1996), a creative writing focused organization that promotes French-language writing.

Marouane died on 8 April 2026, at the age of 65.

== Literary works ==
- 1996: La Fille de la casbah (novel, published by Julliard)
- 1998: Ravisseur (in English: The Abductor novel, published by Julliard)
- 2001: Le Châtiment des hypocrites (novel, published by Le Seuil)
- 2003: L'Algérie des deux rives (Short story collection Fayard)
- 2004: Les Criquelins; suivi de Le sourire de la Joconde (novella, published by Fayard)
- 2005: La Jeune Fille et la Mère (novel, published by Le Seuil)
- 2007: La Vie sexuelle d'un islamiste à Paris (in English, The Sexual Life of an Islamist in Paris, novel, published by Albin Michel)
- 2009: Le Papier, l'encre et la braise (sociological monograph)
- 2009: Nouvelles d'Algérie (short story collection, published by Magellan in October 2009)
- 2012: ALGERIES 50 (short collection by Éditions Magellan, 2012)

== Awards ==
- Jean-Claude Izzo Prize, 2006
- Prix des écrivains de langue française, 2006
- Prix Gironde, 2001
- Prix de la Société des gens de lettres, 2001
- Prix du roman français à New York, 2002
- LiBeraturpreis for Entführer (orig. Ravisseur), 2004
- Creator of Peace (Unesco), 2000
- Narrativa Donna, 2004

== See also ==
- List of Algerian writers
