= Abdelkader Harichane =

- Born: May 26, 1953; Boukadir, Algeria
- Occupations: Writer, journalist
- Writing career
- Language: Arabic, French
- Notable works: Le FIS et le pouvoir, L’Aveugle, Journal du Hirak

Abdelkader Harichane (in Arabic عبد القادر حريشان); born 26 May 1953 in Boukadir, Chlef Province, Algeria) is an Algerian writer and journalist. He is the author of several investigations, essays, and novels dealing with Algeria's political history, the Hirak movement, and international issues such as Palestine.

== Biography ==
After completing his secondary education in Boukadir, Harichane studied in Russia in the field of naval engineering (gas turbines). He later turned to journalism and writing. His journalistic career began in the late 1980s, during the period of media liberalization in Algeria.

== Career ==
Harichane has contributed to several Algerian newspapers, including L’Expression, as a political analyst and columnist. His works address topics such as the FIS, the Algerian Civil War, historical memory, and international conflicts.

== Themes ==
The style of Harichane explore political violence, social transformations in Algeria, the relationship between memory and identity, and contemporary struggles in the Arab world, particularly in Palestine.

== Bibliography ==
- Le FIS et le pouvoir. Alger: ENAG Éditions, 1992. 240 p.
- Le soleil s’est taché de sang. Alger: Dar El Hikma, 1999. 310 p.
- Le thé chez le FLN. Alger: Casbah Éditions, 2005. 276 p.
- La tragédie algérienne et ses hommes. Alger: Chihab Éditions, 2008. 295 p.
- Stèle. Alger: Casbah Éditions, 2010. 270 p.
- Quand Moscou couvait l’élite militaire arabe. Alger: ENAG Éditions, 2014. 220 p.
- Boufarik au temps du Corona. Alger: Chihab Éditions, 2020. 185 p.
- Journal du Hirak. Tome I. Alger: Casbah Éditions, 2021. 312 p.
- Journal du Hirak. Tome II. Alger: Casbah Éditions, 2022. 298 p.
- La bataille de Gaza : Tome I – Le sang et la dignité. Alger: Casbah Éditions, 2022. 250 p.
- La bataille de Gaza : Tome II – Résistance et blocus. Alger: Casbah Éditions, 2023. 264 p.
- La bataille de Gaza : Tome III – L’ombre des martyrs. Alger: Casbah Éditions, 2023. 280 p.
- La bataille de Gaza : Tome IV – Victoires et mémoires. Alger: Casbah Éditions, 2024. 310 p.
- L’Aveugle. Alger: Casbah Éditions, 2023. 340 p.

== Reception ==
His works have been reviewed in the Algerian press, notably in L’Expression and El Khabar, which highlight the critical scope of his investigations and the engaged dimension of his novels.
