= Mohammed Dib =

Algerian writer

- Early photo of Dib
- Born: 21 July 1920; Tlemcen, Algeria
- Died: 2 May 2003 (aged 82); La Celle-Saint-Cloud, France
- Occupations: Novelist, poet
- Writing career
- Language: French
- Period: 1950s- 2000s
- Notable works: the Algerian trilogy, an african summer, God in Barbary
- Notable awards: Fénéon Prize; Mallarmé prize

Signature
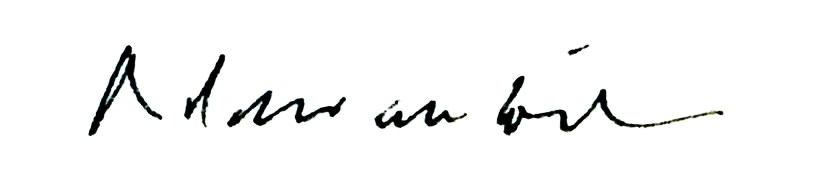

Mohammed Dib (Arabic: محمد ديب; 21 July 1920 – 2 May 2003) was an Algerian author. He wrote over 30 novels, as well as numerous short stories, poems, and children's literature in the French language. His work covers the breadth of 20th century Algerian history, focusing on Algeria's fight for independence.

== Life ==
Dib was born in Tlemcen in Algeria, near the border with Morocco, into a middle-class family which had descended into poverty. After losing his father at a young age, Dib started writing poetry at 15. At the age of 18 he started working as a teacher in nearby Oujda in Morocco. In his twenties and thirties he worked in various capacities as a weaver, teacher, accountant, interpreter (for the French and British military), and journalist (for newspapers including Alger républicain and Liberté, an organ of the Algerian Communist Party). In 1952, two years before the Algerian revolution, he married a French woman, joined the Algerian Communist Party and visited France. In the same year he published his first novel La Grande Maison (The Great House). Dib was a member of the Generation of '52 — a group of Algerian writers which included Albert Camus and Mouloud Feraoun.

In 1959, he was expelled from Algeria by the French authorities for his support for Algerian independence, and also because of the success of his novels (which depicted the reality of life in colonial Algeria for most Algerians). Instead of moving to Cairo as many Algerian nationalists had, he decided to live in France, where he was allowed to stay after various writers (including Camus) lobbied the French government. From 1967 he lived mainly in La Celle-Saint-Cloud near Paris.

From 1976 to 1977 Dib was teacher at the University of California at Los Angeles. He also was a professor at the Sorbonne in Paris. In his later years he often travelled to Finland, which was a setting for some of his later novels. He died at La Celle-Saint-Cloud on 2 May 2003. In a tribute, the then French Culture Minister Jean-Jacques Aillagon said that Dib was "a spiritual bridge between Algeria and France, between the north and the Mediterranean."

== Awards ==
- 1953 Fénéon Prize
- 1994 the grand prix de la Francophonie
- 1998 Mallarmé prize

== Work ==
In his work, Dib was concerned with bringing the authentic experience of Algerian life to a wider, particularly French-speaking, world. The Algerian revolution (1954–1962) profoundly shaped his thinking, and made him eager to bring to the world's attention Algeria's struggle for independence. An advocate of political equality, he believed that "the things that make us different always remain secondary." He has received many awards from the French literary establishment.

=== Novels ===
His debut novel La grande maison was the first part of the Algerian trilogy about a large Algerian family. The main protagonist, Omar, is a young boy growing up in poverty in Algeria just before World War II. The trilogy is presented in a naturalistic style similar to that of Émile Zola. The second part, L'Incendie, published in the same year the Algerian revolution started, was about Omar's life during the second World War. The final part of the trilogy, Le Métier à tisser, deals with Omar's adult life as a working man in Algeria. It was published in 1957. The trilogy was partly autobiographical.

His later works did not always use the same naturalistic framework of his earlier novels, often adding surrealistic elements. He used science fiction in Qui se souvient de la mer (1962), and verse in his last novel L.A. Trip.

From 1985 to 1994 he wrote four semi-autobiographical novels about a North African man who visits a Nordic country, has a relationship and child with a woman in this country. The last novel in this series deals with the child visiting her fathers homeland. Dib also helped to translate into French various Finnish books.

== Bibliography ==
- La grande maison (1952) (awarded Fénéon Prize)
- L'incendie (1954)
- Au café (1957)
- Le métier à tisser (1957)
- Baba Fekrane (1959)
- Un été africain (1959)
- Ombre gardienne (1961)
- Qui se souvient de la mer (1962)
- Cours sur la rive sauvage (1964)
- Le talisman (1966)
- La danse du roi (1968)
- Formulaires (1970)
- Dieu en barbarie (1970)
- Le Maître de chasse (1973)
- L'histoire du chat qui boude (1974)
- Omneros (1975)
- Habel (1977)
- Feu beau feu (1979)
- Mille hourras pour une gueuse (1980)
- Les terrasses d'Orsol (1985)
- O vive- poèmes (1987)
- Le sommeil d'Ève (1989)
- Neiges de Marbre (1990)
- Le Désert sans détour (1992)
- L'infante Maure (1994)
- L'arbre à dires (1998)
- L'Enfant-Jazz (1998)
- Le Cœur insulaire (2000)
- The Savage Night (2001) (trans. by C. Dickson)
- Comme un bruit d'abeilles (2001)
- L.A. Trip (2003)
- Simorgh (2003)
- Laezza (2006)

== See also ==
- List of Algerian writers
- List of African writers
