= Maya Arriz Tamza =

Algerian writer

Maya Arriz Tamza is the nom de plume of Saoud Bousselmania (born October 27, 1957), an Algerian writer.

He was born in the Aures region of Algeria and came to Marseille in 1963. He is the co-founder of the Théâtre des Sept Chandelles in Maubourguet.

== Selected works ==
- Lune et Orian, oriental tale (1987)
- Ombres, novel (1989)
- Quelque part en Barbarie, novel (1993)
- Le Soupire de Maure (The Moor's sigh), play (2001)
- Les sept perles du sou, novel (2009)
