= Fadhila El Farouk =

Algerian writer

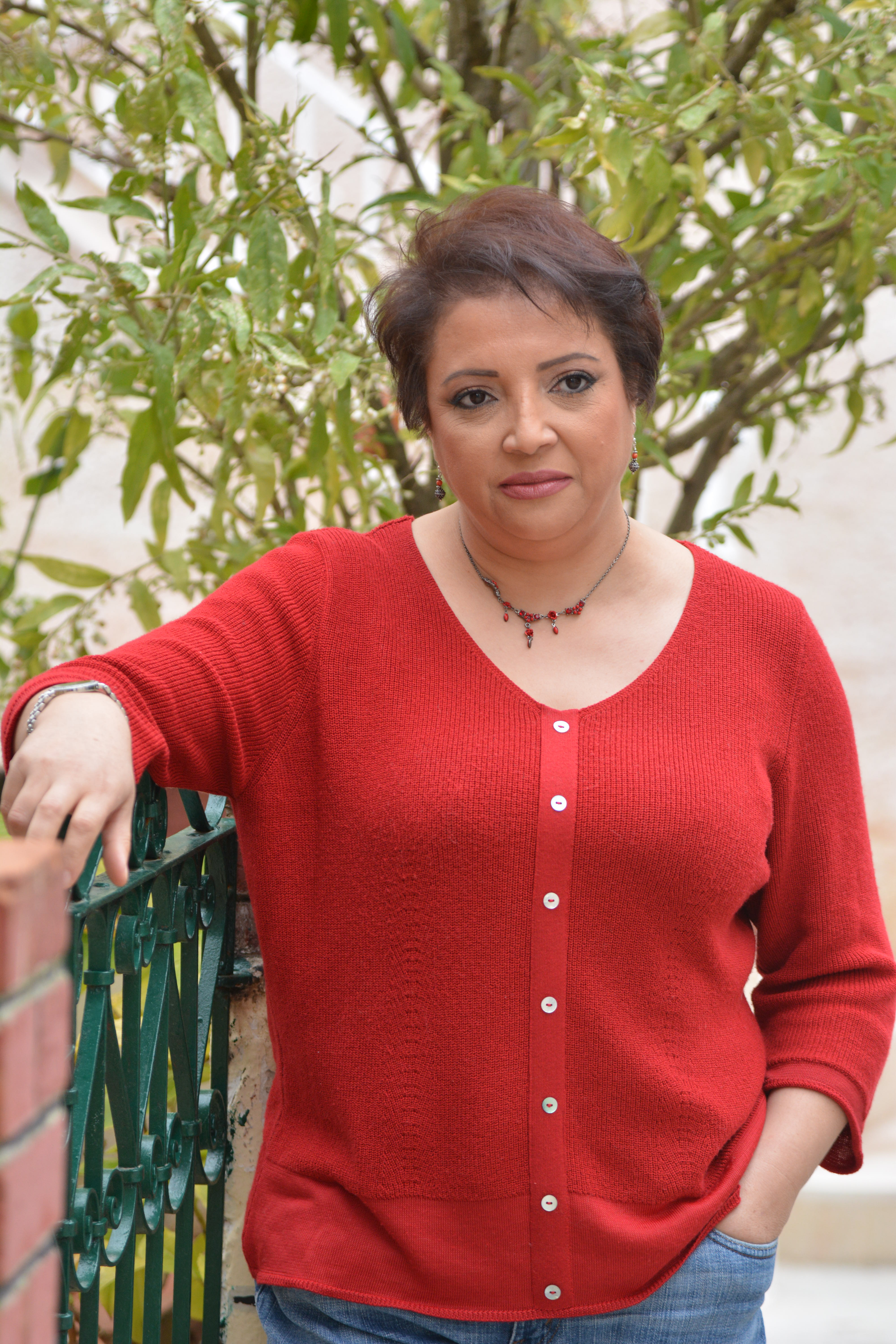
- Fadhila El Farouk in 2015
- Born: Fadhila Melkemi; November 20, 1967 (age 58)
- Education: University of Constantine
- Occupation: Writer

Fadhila El Farouk (November 20, 1967, Arris, Algeria) is the artistic name of the Algerian writer Fadhila Melkemi.

== Biography ==
Fadhila Melkemi grew up in Constantine, Algeria, speaking Berber. She received her baccalaureate degree in 1987 and joined the mathematics department and the Faculty of Medicine at the University of Batna for two years. She then returned to the University of Constantine, and joined the Institute of Literature, where she found her calling. She got her own show on the National Station of Constantine, entitled "Ports of Creativity". In the written press, she began as an assistant in the An-nasr newspaper. During her second year at the university, she became a journalist at the Hayat newspaper of Constantine, and graduated in 1993.

Farouk finished her certificate and rejoined the University of Constantine in 1994. She moved to Beirut in October 1995, just after the civil war. There she met poet and playwright Paul Shaoul, who supported her as a writer. At the end of 1996 she joined the Al Kifah Al Arabi newspaper, and worked there for a year. In 1997 she self-published A Moment of Stolen Love and in 1997 The Mood of a Teenager in the Farabi publishing house in Beirut. Her novel The Feminine Shame remained unpublished for two years, but was finally accepted by the publishing house of Riad Risn with the support of poet and writer Emad Al-Abdallah. The novel's themes are rape and related laws in Arab society, and reveals the suffering of raped women in Algeria during the Black Decade. The Feminine Shame was translated into French and Spanish, and some parts were translated into Italian. The novel calls for the coexistence of religions and equality between men and women, and condemns wars of all kinds.

Farouk writes in Arabic. In 2005, she published the novel The Discovery of Desire, and in 2010 Regions of Fear, both with Riyad Al Rayes of Beirut.
