= Salah Benlabed =

Algerian architect

- Education: Architecture
- Occupation: Architect

Salah Benlabed (born 1950) is an Algerian architect, academic, novelist and poet. Formerly a professor of architecture at the University of Algiers, he has been based in Montreal for more than a decade. He has designed numerous architectural projects in both Algeria and Quebec, including the CCE towers in downtown Montreal.

== Career ==
Benlabed has co-authored a book of poems entitled Quand la terre tremble (When the earth trembles), published by the Algerian Cultural Center. He has participated in the Montreal Festival of the Arab World, delivering lectures and readings of his poems. In 2004, he set up a show on Abu Nuwas, the medieval Baghdadi poet.

Since 2006, Benlabed has published two collections of short stories and two novels. In November 2009, the Montreal-based Future Club Foundation honored Benlabed by presenting him with their award for outstanding artistic contribution by an Algerian. His first novel Notes d’une musique ancienne (Notes of an Ancient Music) was published by Editions APIC in Algeria in April 2010.

== Works published by Plein Lune (Quebec) ==
- Valise grise (La) (short stories, 2006)
- Notes d’une musique ancienne (novel, 2007)
- De quelques défauts qui font les humains (short stories, 2009)
- Ô combien de marins, combien de capitaines (novel, 2010)
- Le dernier refuge (novel, 2011)
