= Saïda Abouba =

- Born: May 30, 1963 (age 63); Thimsounin, Ichmoul, Batna Province, Aurès, Algeria
- Occupations: Teacher, writer

Saïda Abouba (born May 30, 1963) is an Algerian teacher, novelist, poet, and translator.

== Biography ==
Saïda Abouba was born in Thimsounin, Ichmoul, Batna Province, in the Aurès region. She graduated from the University of Batna Hadj Lakhder with a degree in English and earned a DEA in hygiene and safety. She currently teaches English in Batna.

== Bibliography ==
=== Novels and tales ===
- Aurès: A novel where Saïda Abouba traces the journey of a Chaoui person during the "dark decade" in Algeria.
- Poetry collections in Tamazight, in both French and English languages.
- Betta, le combat d'une aurassiène: A novel depicting the destiny of a Chaoui woman.
- Aurès Tamazight.

== Recognition ==
Saïda Abouba was honored during the 8th edition of the Amazigh Theater Festival in Batna, held at the Regional Theater of Batna.
