= Hawa Djabali =

Algerian playwright, screenwriter, and writer

- Born: 1 January 1949 (age 77); Créteil
- Citizenship: Algeria
- Occupations: Screenwriter, Writer, Playwright, Director of radio drama, Radio producer

Hawa Djabali (born in 1949 in Créteil, Paris) is a French-born Algerian playwright, screenwriter, and writer.

== Life ==
She was born in Créteil in 1949. In 1963, her family moved to Algeria. She studied dance, theater and singing at the conservatory, in Algiers.

She was a radio reader and personality. She illustrated animations of programs for children, then scientific programs, and finally becomes a producer of her own programs. Among her programs, were "The Other Half," on Algiers Channel 3, on the condition of working women in Algeria. She also wrote radio plays, as well as articles for the press.

In 1983, she published her first novel, Agave. It is devoted to the difficulty of communication between spouses. At the end of the 1980s, she received death threats, and was also withdrawn from broadcasts, under pressure from fundamentalists. She decided to leave Algeria with her children to settle in the Brussels region, in Saint-Josse-ten-Noode. In 1989, she became co-moderator for an Arab Center for Art and Culture, while continuing to devote herself to writing, theatrical writing, novels, and short stories.

In 1998, she wrote a new novel, published, Glaise Rouge. In 2013, a new novel, Noirs Jasmins, was published.

She published plays: in 1995 The Epic of Gilgameh (written in collaboration with Aki Khedder); in 1997 Five thousand years of a woman's life; in 1997 The Moorish Zajel of Desire, and in 1998 The Eighth Voyage of Sindbad.

== Works ==
Novels

- Agave, Paris: Publisud, 1983. ISBN 9782866000950
- Glaise rouge : Boléro pour un pays meurtri : roman, suivi de l'actualité culturelle, Alger: Marsa éditions, 1999.
- Noirs jasmins : roman Paris : Éd. de la Différence, 2013. ISBN 9782729120207

Plays

- Sa naqba imourou : Geligeamech, ou celui qui a vu et touché le fond des choses Brussel : Éditions Arabes Théâtre : Koninklijke Vlaamse Schouwburg : Centre culturel arabe, 1995
- Cinq mille ans de la vie d'une femme Bruxelles : Editions du Centre culturel arabe, 1997.
- Hawa Djabali; Ali Khedher; Christiane Achour, Le zajel maure du désir, Bruxelles : Editions du Centre Culturel Arabe, 1998.
