= Zoulikha Tahar =

Algerian feminist, poet

- Born: August 15, 1992 (age 34); Oran, Algeria
- Education: Djillali Liabes University
- Occupations: Feminist; poet; slam artist; videographer
- Years active: 2015–present
- Organizations: Awal Collective; Tej Leryem Collective
- Known for: Toute Fine
- Notable work: Presque Deux; La rue

Zoulikha Tahar (Arabic: زوليخة طاهر), also known as Toute Fine, (born 15 August 1992, Oran) is an Algerian feminist, poet, slameuse and self-taught videographer. She is a doctoral student in materials mechanics (University Djillali Liabes in Sidi-bel-Abbès).

== Works ==
Zoulikha Tahar began writing under the pseudonym Toute Fine in 2015.

In 2017, Toute Fine became known thanks to a short film co-directed with Sam MB about street harassment. The film, titled La rue, received a lot of attention. La rue was screened at several cultural events (at the Bourse du travail in Toulouse and - followed by a debate on the place of women in public space - as part of the festival Algérie en mouvement in Paris).

In October 2017, with the contribution of the Institut Français in Oran, she edited a collection of poetry entitled Presque Deux, a reconstruction of photos and texts from the first two years of Toute Fine's existence on social media.

In November 2017, Toute Fine adapted its collection for a performance and played for the first time in Paris at the Théâtre de la Nouvelle Seine and in March 2018 at the Institut Français in Annaba. The performance, titled Autour de presque deux, was followed by a debate on the many themes covered, with the primary aim of liberating, spreading and sharing free speech.

She worked at the Institute of the Arab World with Eddy Terki, a French-Algerian graphic designer, on From Paris to Oran (dialogue between two shores). The performance/installation discussed the challenges of connecting two cities with an intertwined history but different cultures.

Toute Fine animates many writing workshops, sometimes with the Institut Français of Oran in Algeria. It organises literary meetings, debates and readings, mainly of a feminist nature.

=== Awal Collective ===
Zoulikha Tahar is a member and co-founder of the Awal (meaning: word) collective which is composed of four slameurs and slameuses: Zoulikha (Toute Fine), Samia (Sam Mb) and Sedik (WHO Sedik) with varying participation of musicians and singers in certain scenes, such as Sabri Farouk (guitarist and singer) and Kamel Hadji (also guitarist and singer). The collective's scenes are very rich in diversity. That diversity is between slam and vocals with influences from blues, soul and alternative pop.

==== Tej Leryem Collective ====
Zoulikha Tahar is also a member and co-founder of the Tej Leryem collective (meaning: women's crown) which consists of artists Toute Fine, Ahlem Imene and Bouchra Zozo. Tej Leryem creates exhibitions, paintings, photographs and videos as well as performances of slam.
