= Leïla Aouchal =

French-Algerian writer (1936–2013)

- Born: Liliane Hélène Roberte Constantin; 13 July 1936; Caen
- Died: 21 April 2013 (aged 76); Gonesse
- Occupation: writer
- Writing career
- Notable work: Une Autre Vie

Leïla Aouchal (born Liliane Hélène Roberte Constantin; 13 July 1936 – 21 April 2013) was a French-Algerian writer.

== Life ==
She was born to a middle-class French family in Caen, France, in 1936, and married an Algerian immigrant at the age of 19, moving with him to Algeria. Upon the country's 1962 achievement of independence, Aouchal became an Algerian citizen.

Despite being raised as a Catholic, she gradually became "Algerianized"; she began to read the Koran, converted to Islam and avoided Christian festivals in Algeria. Aouchal died in Gonesse in 2013.

== Works ==
In 1970, Aouchal published Une Autre Vie, an autobiographical account of her experience of integrating into Algerian society amidst a civil war. This would be her only work.

Despite her brief writing career, she was cited as being included in the first generation of female Algerian writers using French language (along with such names as Fadhma Aït Mansour and Taos Amrouche). These individuals were born between 1882–1928, publishing their texts between 1960–1980. Common themes are the "self-discovery" of the authors, with texts set during the Algerian War and the evolution of the female condition during this time in the country.
