= Djanet Lachmet =

Algerian novelist and actress (born 1948)

- Born: 1948 (age 76–77); Algeria
- Education: Bordj El Kiffan (drama)
- Occupation(s): Actress, novelist

Djanet Lachmet (born 1948) is an Algerian novelist and actress.

== Life ==
Djanet Lachmet was born in a small town in Algeria. Forced into marriage at sixteen, she divorced three months later. Wanting to be a comedian, she studied drama for four years at Bordj El Kiffan. From 1968 to 1972 she lived in Canada, and later moved to Paris to work as an actress.

== Works ==
- Le Cow-Boy. Paris: Belfond, 1983. Translated into English by Judith Still as Lallia, 1987.
- 'Une Composante de l'underground français', Actualités de l'émigration 80, 11 March 1986
