= Anna Gréki =

Algerian poet (1931–1966)

- Born: Colette Anna Grégoire; 14 March 1931; Batna, Algeria, Algeria
- Died: 6 January 1966 (aged 34); Algiers, Algeria
- Occupations: Poet, school teacher
- Known for: Algérie capitale Alger

Colette Anna Grégoire (known as Anna Gréki; 14 March 1931 – 6 January 1966) was an Algerian poet of French origin. She married an Algerian, considered herself Algerian, and was involved in the struggle for Algeria's independence from France. Her work shows her love of the Aurès Mountains where she grew up, and her strong political beliefs.

== Life ==
Colette Anna Grégoire was born on 14 March 1931 in Batna, Algeria. She grew up in Menaâ, a small town in the Aurès Mountains, in a Chaoui Berber community. She was from a third-generation Pied-Noir family in Algeria, and was the only child of a family of progressive teachers who were very integrated into the Muslim culture. Her father taught elementary school. She became very conscious of the discrimination and injustice of the colonial system. As an adolescent she was extremely poor, but was helped by the community.

Colette Grégoire attended university in Paris, but returned to Algeria before graduating to assist in the struggle for independence. She joined the Parti Communiste Algérien (PCA). In 1955 she was a communist at a time when the communist party was banned. She always also fought for equal rights for women. Grégoire was arrested in April 1957 and imprisoned in Algiers at the Barberousse prison. Women here were beaten, abused and tortured with water and electricity. She was sent to an internment camp, and in 1958 was deported, probably because of her French origins.

Colette Grégoire married in 1960. Her husband was an Algerian named Melki. Her pen-name Anna Gréki is formed from their two last names. After independence in 1962 Colette Grégoire returned to Algeria. In 1963 she was one of the few Europeans to point out the discrimination in the law of 1963 which said that both parents should be from a paternal line born in Algeria and should be Muslim. In 1965 she obtained her BA in French Literature and became a high school teacher in Algiers. She taught in the Lycée Abdelkader.

== Death ==
Colette Grégoire died on 6 January 1966 during childbirth, at the age of 34.

== Work ==
Anna Gréki's poetry reflects her love of her native land, the Aurès, and her political beliefs. She wrote of her native country,

Mon enfance et les délices, naquirent là à Menaa, commune mixte Arris, et mes passions après vingt ans, sont le fruit de leurs prédilections... Tout ce qui me touche en ce monde jusqu'à l'âme, sort d'un massif peint en rose et blanc sur les cartes. (My childhood and delights were born there at Menaa, a mixed Arris commune, and after twenty years my passions are the fruit... Everything that touches me to the soul in this world comes from a massif shown in pink and white on the maps.)

Anna Gréki's poetry was among the best to be produced during the Algerian war of independence. She praised the women who had the courage to join the struggle for freedom, and was optimistic about the future. She did not stress the trouble she experienced in prison, but tried to raise the morale of other women. She wrote,

Beyond the walls closed like clenched fists
Through the bars encircling the sun

Our thoughts are vertical ...

And again,

I press you against my breast my sister
Builder of liberty and tenderness
And I say to you await tomorrow
For we know
The future is soon

The future is for tomorrow.

Anna Gréki published one volume of poetry during her lifetime, Algérie capitale Alger, published in 1963 in Tunisia. The preface to this work was written by Mostefa Lacheraf. Other works, published posthumously, are:

- Éléments pour un art nouveau (with Mohammed Khadda) Galerie Pilote (Edmond Charlot), Algiers, 1966.
- Temps forts, Présence africaine, Paris, 1966.
- Théories, prétextes et réalités in Présence Africaine, n°58, 1966.

== Sources ==
- Auzias, Dominique; Labourdette, Jean-Paul (27 October 2010). Algérie. Petit Futé. ISBN 978-2-7469-2575-5.
- Chipasula, Frank M. (Spring 1994). "Remembering Forgotten Singers: Reassembling Voices of Contemporary African Women". The Kenyon Review. New Series. 16 (2). Kenyon College: 158–173. JSTOR 4337060.
- Collon, Michel (1994). Attention medias: les médiamensonges du Golfe, manuel anti-manipulation, + nouveaux médiamensonges : Somalie, Yougoslavie, Pérou,... Editions Aden. ISBN 978-2-87262-087-6.
- Dore-Audibert, Andrée (1 January 1995). Des Françaises d'Algérie dans la Guerre de libération: des oubliées de l'histoire. KARTHALA Editions. ISBN 978-2-86537-574-5.
- Joris, Pierre (24 February 2007). "Anna Gréki".
- Joris, Pierre; Tengour, Habib (21 October 2012). Poems for the Millennium, Volume Four: The University of California Book of North African Literature. University of California Press. ISBN 978-0-520-27385-6.
- Naylor, Phillip C. (5 September 2006). Historical Dictionary of Algeria. Scarecrow Press. ISBN 978-0-8108-6480-1.
