= Zuhur Wanasi =

Algerian author and politician

- زهور ونيسي
- Born: 1936 (age 89–90); Constantine, Algeria
- Education: University of Algiers
- Occupations: Author, politician

Zuhur Wanasi (Arabic: زهور ونيسي; also written as Zhour Ouanissi, Zhor Ounissi, and occasionally Zahwar Wanissi; born 1936) is a prolific Algerian author and politician. She is known for her powerful short stories and for her role as one of the first women in Algerian government.

== Early life and education ==
Wanasi was born in December 1936 in Constantine, Algeria, where she lived until adulthood. Wanasi obtained two degrees in literature and philosophy at the University of Algiers. She continued her studies at a graduate level at the University of Algiers, specializing in sociology.

== Writing ==
Her literature has received recognition in Arab states and around the world. Wanasi is remarked as using striking content and form to shore up morale and critique social ills. Most of her short stories tackle the difficult relationship between men and women. Also, Wanasi's writing depicts women’s feelings as they explores human and social customs, For her groundbreaking writing during the Algerian Revolution, Wanasi received the Medal of Resistance and the Medal of Appreciation in Media and Culture. Wanasi has published in many Algerian papers. She was also a founding member of the literary magazine, The Algerian. Wanasi was the first Algerian woman to write fiction in Arabic and her work was adapted to TV in 1984. She is a member of the Writers Union of Algeria, a body of writers who discusses the role of writers in Algerian society.

=== Influences ===
The Algerian Revolution started in November 1954. Guerrilla warfare, torture, and terrorism devastated the lives of many Algerians. While several women joined the movement as nurses, cooks and as various supportive positions, Wanasi participated in the revolution as a political author. The Algerian Revolution spurred Wanasi to discuss the national liberation movement and the resulting social concerns. Women of this time, particularly those of Northern African descent, discussed similar topics in their work — war, corrupt government, religion and the increasing importance of women.

== Politics ==
Wanasi is one of the first women to hold high level positions in the Algerian government. She was a member of the National Peoples Council from 1977 to 1982, the Minister of Social Affairs in the government in 1982, the Minister for Social protection in 1984 and Head of the Department of Education in 1986. In her 18 months at the Department of Education, Wanasi she spent time working to reform administration and address access to school materials. She made comments about the French language in the schools, saying that she was not against the learning of French, just against the ideological association to the language. She returned to the political stage in 1997 as the first female member of the Algerian Parliament. As an active voice in the People's National Assembly, she called for political parties to be unified when working for the youth of Algeria.

== Works ==
- "al-Rasîf al-nâ’im" (The Sleeping Sidewalk, short stories) (Le trottoir dormant, nouvelles)
- Min yawmiyât mudarrisa (From the Diary of a Female Teacher, novel) (Journal d'une enseignante)
- "al-Zilal al-mumtadda" (Extended Shadows, short stories) (les ombres étendues, nouvelles)
- "Lunja wa-l-ghûl" (Lunja and the Ghoul, short stories) (Lundja et l'ogre, nouvelles)
- "‘Ajâ’iz al-qamar" (Old Men of the Moon, short stories) (Les vieux de la lune, nouvelles)

== See also ==
- Gender apartheid
- Women in Algeria
