= Salima Ghezali =

Algerian journalist and writer (born 1958)

- Salima Ɣezali
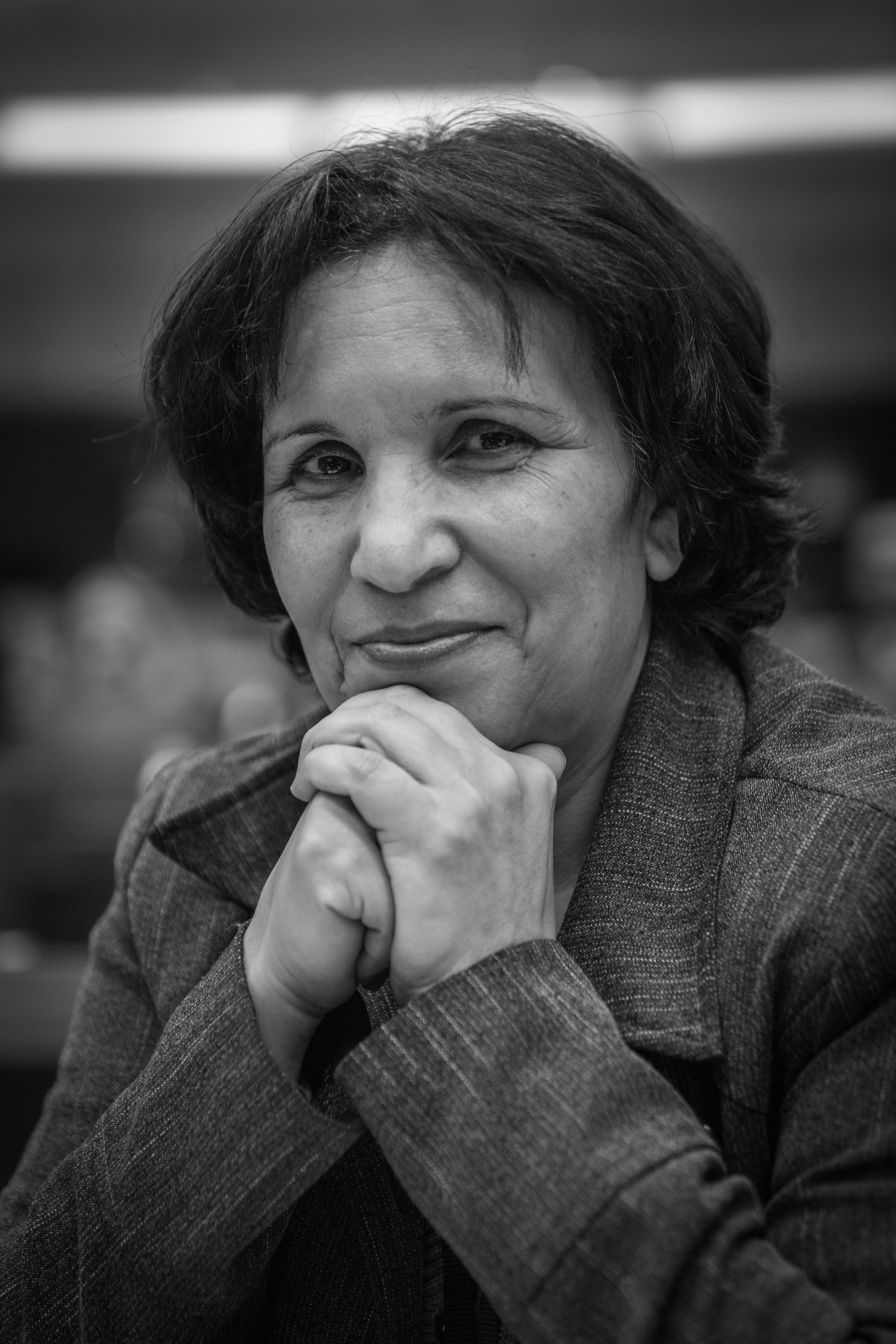
- Ghezali in 2013
- Born: 1958 (age 67–68); Bouïra, French Algeria
- Occupation: Journalist
- Known for: Women's rights
- Awards: Sakharov Prize; Olof Palme Prize

Salima Ghezali (Kabyle: Salima Ɣezali; born 1958) is an Algerian journalist and writer.

== Career ==
A founding member of Women in Europe and the Maghreb, president of the association for the advancement of women, editor of the women's magazine NYSSA, which she founded, and editor of the French-language weekly La Nation, Salima Ghezali is an activist of women's rights and human rights and democracy in Algeria.

Ghezali was a major opposition to both government authorities and the islamic parties on the issue of censorship and violation of human rights in Algeria during Algerian Civil War.

In 2017, she was elected to the People's National Assembly (lower house of the Algerian Parliament) as a representative for the Algiers constituency. In 2018, she published a critical article on Tout Sur l'Algérie, denouncing military interference in political affairs—an act that led to her expulsion from the FFS, highlighting her stance on civilian governance and political independence. In 2019, she voluntarily resigned from her parliamentary mandate, underscoring her commitment to political integrity and personal principles. In 2000, she became actively involved in politics as a member of the Socialist Forces Front (Front des Forces Socialistes, FFS) and served as an advisor to the party's historic leader, Hocine Aït Ahmed.

== Awards ==
In 1997, Ghezali won the Sakharov Prize as well as the Olof Palme Prize. In 1998, he received the prize "Archivio Disarmo - Golden Doves for Peace" from IRIAD.
