= Maryse Wolinski =

French writer and journalist (1943–2021)

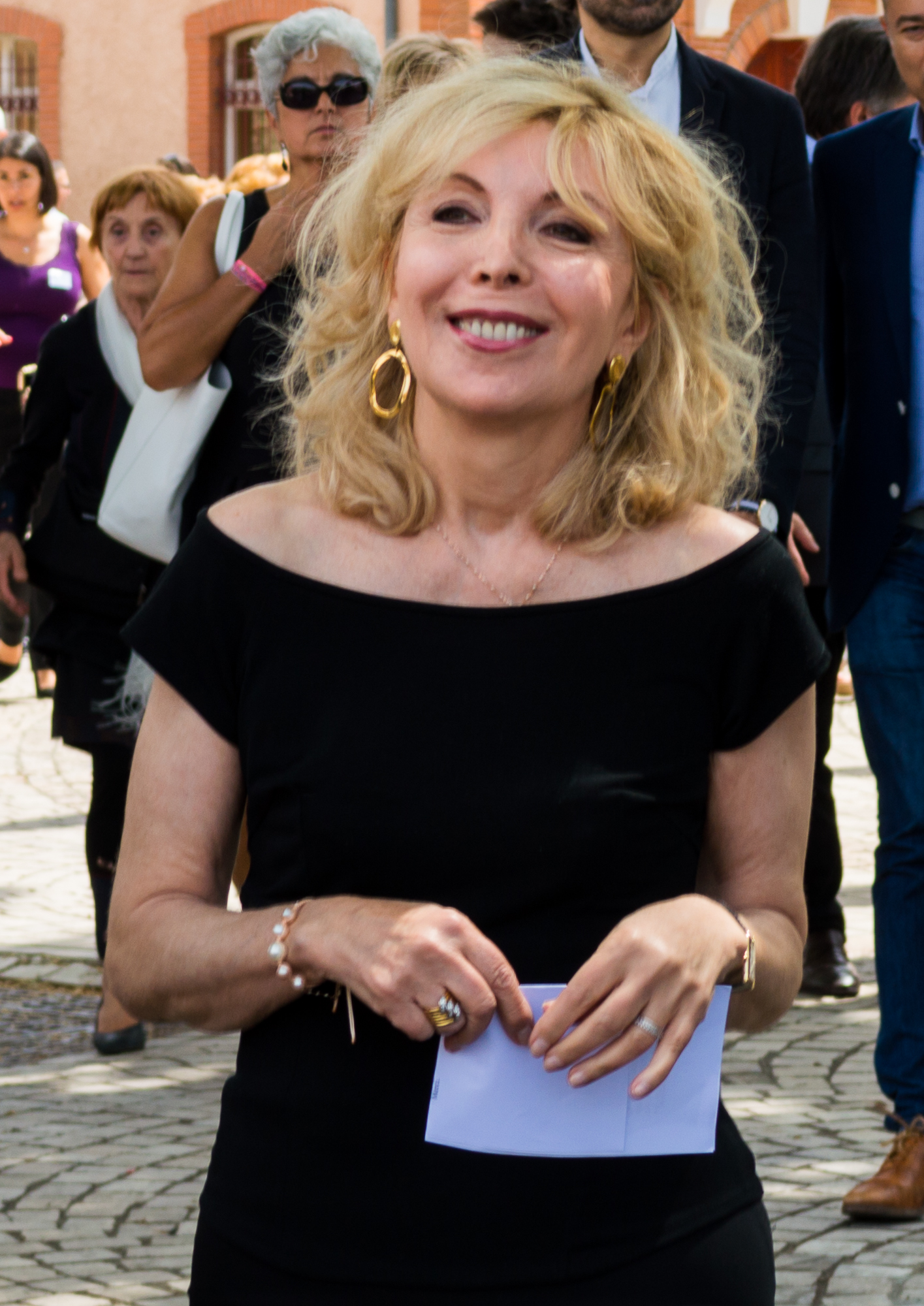
- Born: Maryse Bachère; 3 May 1943; Algiers, French Algeria, France
- Died: 9 December 2021 (aged 78); Paris, France
- Occupations: Writer; Journalist
- Spouse: Georges Wolinski (m. 1972–2015)
- Children: 1
- Writing career
- Language: French
- Website: marysewolinski.com

Maryse Wolinski (3 May 1943 – 9 December 2021) was a French journalist, novelist and writer. She was the widow of the cartoonist Georges Wolinski who died on 7 January 2015 during the Charlie Hebdo shooting in Paris.

== Biography ==
Born in Algiers in May 1943, she spent her childhood in Paris and south east France and at age 20 studied journalism. Her first job was as a society writer in Sud-Ouest and later on Le Journal du Dimanche where she met her future husband, the cartoonist Georges Wolinski. They had three children. She also worked as a freelancer in a number of publications like F Magazine, Elle and Généraliste (a specialized medical magazine), and she wrote frequently in Monde-Dimanche, a Sunday supplement to the daily newspaper Le Monde.

Wolinski wrote Une Histoire des femmes and her book La Divine Sieste de papa was adapted for television by director Alain Nahum. She also wrote songs sung by Carlos, Bernadette Lafont and Sarah Mesguish, broadcast during a Christmas programme on France 3 in 1986. She later included them in a special publication that won the best award for youth readers. She subsequently published other books aimed at younger audiences and continued writing song lyrics that were sung by Catherine Bériane and the Canadian, Diane Tell.

She wrote a number of novels, including Au Diable Vauvert, Le Maître d’amour and La femme qui aimait les hommes, a best seller. She also wrote the pocketbook novels Graines de Femmes, La Tragédie du Bonheur and La Chambre d’amour and a number of scenarios for television series, most notably on TF1 called Protection rapprochée. Her 2016 book, Chérie, je vais à Charlie, dealt with the terrorist attack that killed her husband.

Wolinski died of cancer in Paris on 9 December 2021, at the age of 78.

== Novels ==
- Au Diable vauvert, Flammarion, 1988
- Le Maître d'amour, Flammarion, 1992
- Graines de femme, Albin Michel, 1996
- La Femme qui aimait les hommes, Albin Michel, 1998
- La Tragédie du bonheur, Albin Michel, 1998
- La Chambre d'amour, Albin Michel, 1998
- La Mère qui voulait être femme, Seuil, 2008
- La Sibylline, Seuil, 2010
- La Passion d'Edith S., Seuil, 2014
- Chérie, je vais à Charlie, Seuil, 2016

== Other books ==
- L'Adoption, une autre naissance, Bernard Barrault, 1992
- Lettre ouverte aux hommes qui n'ont toujours rien compris aux femmes, Albin Michel, 1993
- Si tu veux maigrir, mange !, Albin Michel, 2000
- Nous serons toujours jeunes et beaux, Albin Michel, 2001
- Chambre à part, Albin Michel, 2002
- L'Ivresse de vivre : le défi de la longévité, Albin Michel, 2004
- Georges, si tu savais…, Seuil, 2011
- Chérie, je vais à Charlie, Seuil, 2016 (trans. Darling, I'm Going to Charlie: A Memoir, Atria, 2017)
- Le Goût de la belle vie , Seuil, 2017
