= Fatima Gallaire =

French--Algerian playwright (1944–2020)

- Born: Fatima Bourega; 7 August 1944; El Harrouch, French Algeria
- Died: 15 September 2020 (aged 76); Paris, France
- Occupations: Playwright, author
- Notable work: You have come back House of Wives
- Awards: Arletty Prize

Fatima Gallaire, née Bourega, (7 August 1944 – 15 September 2020) was a Franco-Algerian playwright and author of short stories, who wrote in French. Born in Algeria, she held degrees in French Literature from the University of Algiers, and in Cinema from Paris 8 University. She wrote over twenty plays, many of which have been translated and performed in languages including English, Italian, German, Spanish and Uzbek. These include Princesses, translated as You have come back, and Les Co-épouses, translated as House of Wives. She received the Arletty Prize for Drama in 1990 and the Académie française AMIC award in 1994.

== Biography ==
Gallaire was born as Fatima Bourega on 7 August 1944 in El Harrouch in north-eastern Algeria. After studying French literature at the University of Algiers (1963–67), she moved to Paris where she studied cinema until 1970.

After working for four years at the Algiers Cinémathèque, she returned to Paris in 1975 where she earned a degree in Cinema Studies at Paris 8 University, Vincennes, in 1980. The following year she married a Frenchman, adopting his family name for her publications. She gave birth to twins, a boy and a girl, in 1981. In 1985, she began to write for the theatre, her Ah vous êtes venus... (later retitled Princesses) being presented at the Théâtre Essaion in Paris in February 1986. In 1991, she wrote her first novel Le Mendigot.

Gallaire died 15 September 2020 in Paris, aged 76.

== Works translated into English ==
- You have come back (Princesses), in "Plays by women: an International Anthology", ed. Francoise Kourilsky and Catherine Temerson, Ubu Repertory Theater Publications, 1988.
- Madame Bertin's Testimony (Témoignage contre un homme stérile), in "Monologues : plays from Martinique, France, Algeria, Quebec", Ubu Repertory Theater, New York, 1995.
- House of Wives (Les Co-épouses), in "Four Plays from North Africa", ed. Marvin Carlson, Martin E. Segal Theatre Center Publications, New York, 2008.

== Awards ==
In 1990, she was awarded the Arletty Prize for her contributions to drama. She also received the AMIC Award from the Académie française in 1994.
