= Ouarda Baziz Chérifi =

Algerian poet

- Born: Azazga, District of Tizi Ouzou, Algeria
- Occupations: Poet, Novelist

Ouarda Baziz Chérifi is an Algerian poet and novelist.

== Biography ==
Ouarda Baziz Chérifi was born in Azazga, District of Tizi Ouzou. She actively participates in literary activities across various villages and cities in Algeria through literary cafes. Formerly an English teacher, Ouarda Baziz Chérifi turned to writing in French after retirement, reflecting on the socio-cultural realities of her country.

== Selected works ==
- Amour de guerre, 2015.
- Principes et amertumes, 2017.
- Les survivants de l'oubli, 2018.
- Mots et Maux, 2019.
- Quand pleure le jasmin, 2020.
- Tu seras grand, mon fils!, 2021.
- Comme un coup de Massue, 2022.

== Awards and honours ==
She won the first prize in the Femmes de demain competition in 2020 for her novel Quand pleure le jasmin, which was among the three winners of the Plus jamais invisibles competition in 2020, organized by Femmes de demain in partnership with UN Women. Ouarda Baziz Chérifi was honored at the Maison de la Culture Mouloud Mammeri in Tizi Ouzou on International Women's Day, March 8, 2023.
