= Wassyla Tamzali =

Algerian writer, lawyer, and feminist (born 1941)

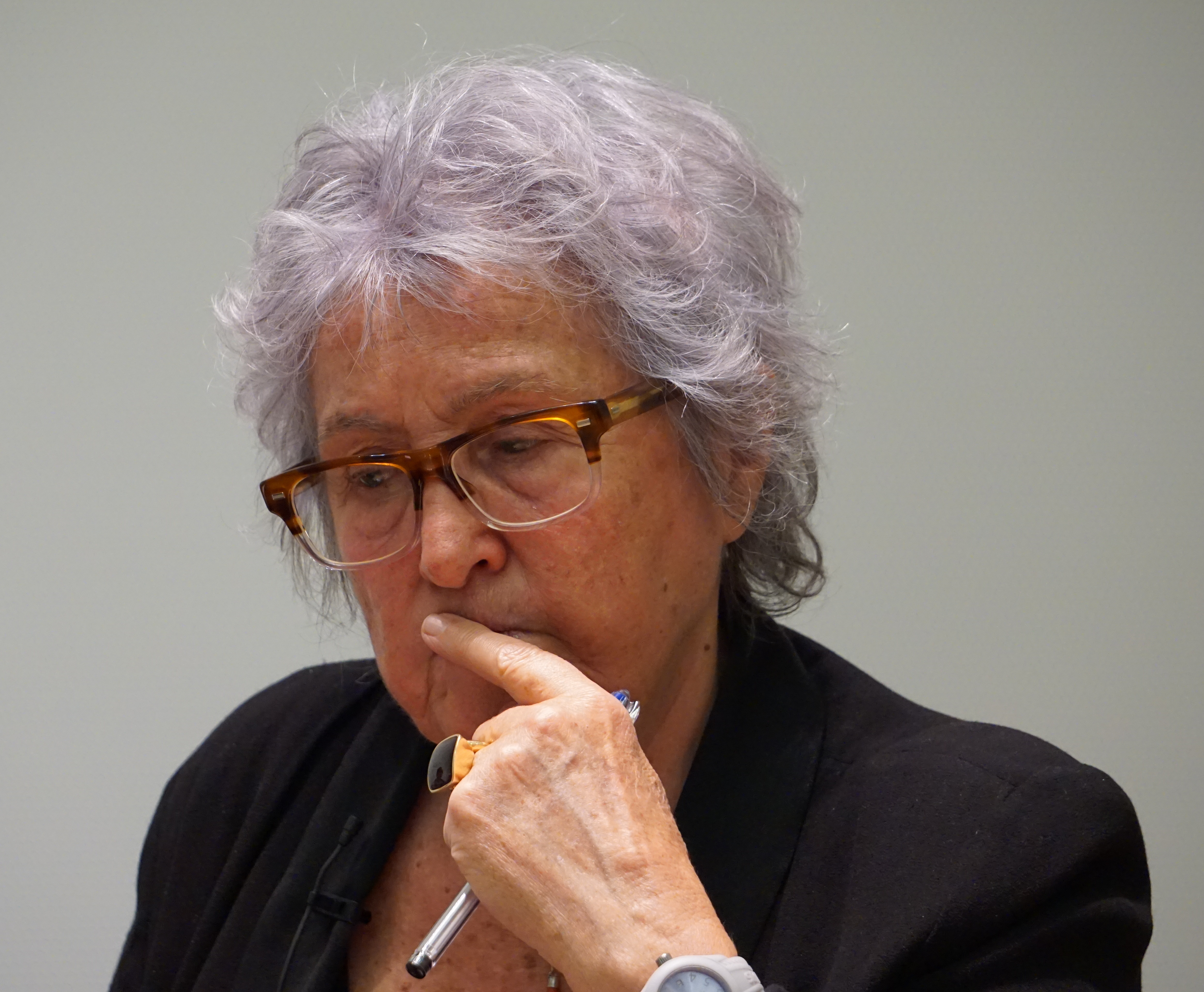
- Born: 1941 (age 84–85); Béjaïa, Algeria
- Occupation: lawyer
- Known for: UNESCO, Forum international des Femmes de la Méditerranée

Wassyla Tamzali (born 1941) is an Algerian writer, lawyer, and feminist.

== Biography ==
The daughter of an Algerian father of Turkish origin, and a Spanish mother, she was born in Béjaïa. She was raised by her Spanish mother after the murder of her father. From 1966 to 1977, she was a lawyer in the Algerian court system. In 1979, she joined UNESCO, responsible for the program dealing with violations of women's rights. In 1989, she became part of the leadership of the Socialist Forces Front. She was a founding member of the Collectif Maghreb Égalité in 1992. In 1996, she became director of the program for promoting the status of women in the Mediterranean area. In 2001, she became vice-president of the Forum international des Femmes de la Méditerranée. In 2006, she became executive director for the Collectif Maghreb Égalité.

Tamzali self-identifies as a "woman, bourgeois, Francophone, feminist and freethinker, if not atheist."

In 2018 Tamazali won the Mediterranean Award for Culture.

== Selected works ==
- En attendant Omar Gatlato (1979)
- Abzim, with Claude Ber (1984)
- Une éducation algérienne. De la révolution à la revanche des tribu (2007)
- Une femme en colère (2009)
- Burqa? (2010)
