= Khadija Benguenna =

Algerian journalist

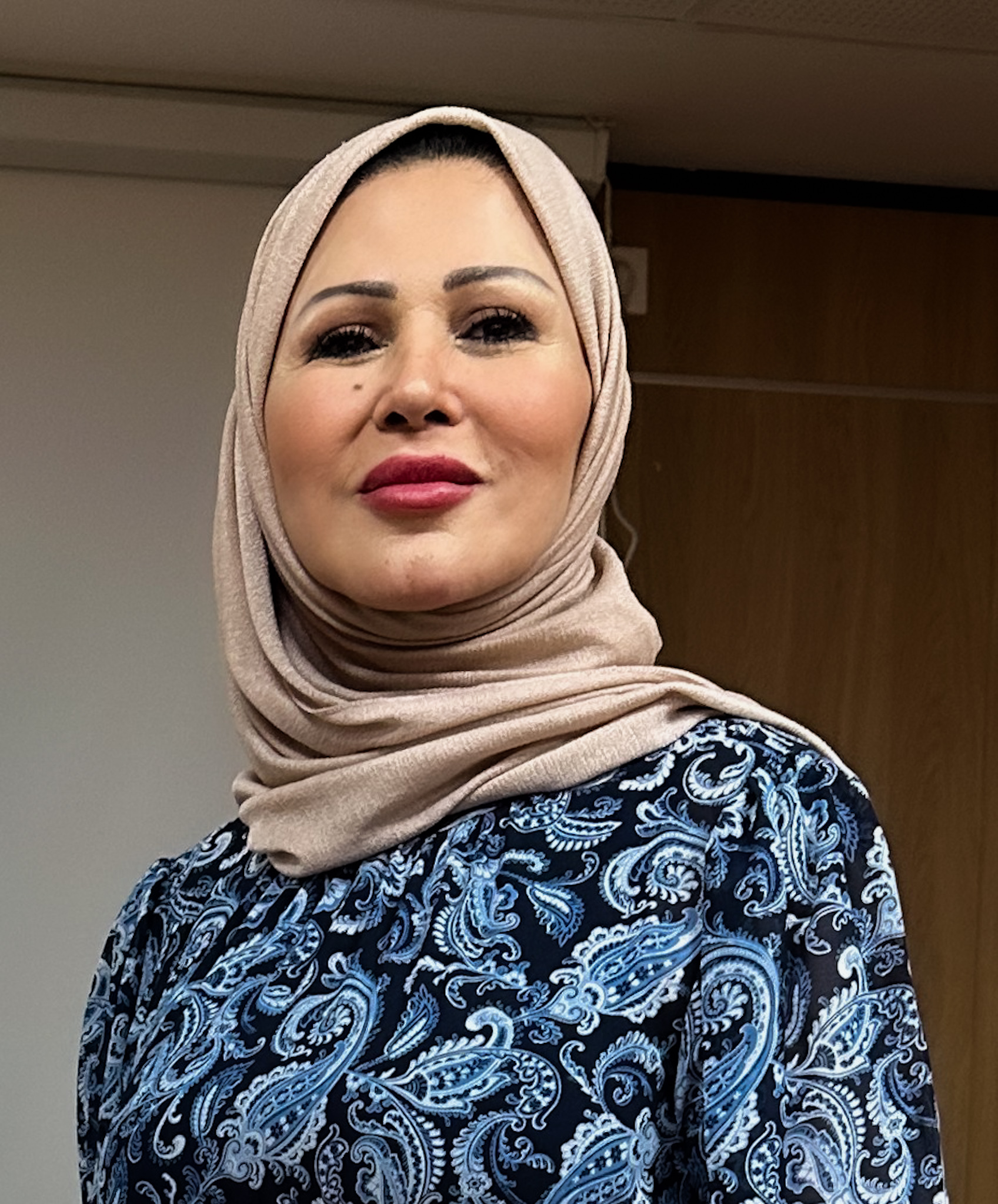
- Born: 1965 (age 60–61)
- Citizenship: Algerian
- Education: University of Algeria
- Occupation: Journalist
- Employer: Al Jazeera

Khadija Benguenna (in Arabic: خديجة بن قنة) is an Algerian professional journalist and TV presenter works at Al Jazeera channel. Born in Algeria in 1965, Khadija Benguenna has been ranked among the Arab world’s most influential personalities by Forbes Magazine, CNN and Arabian Business.

Khadija Benguenna graduated from the radio and television section of the Media Institute at the University of Algiers.

She has interviewed several heads of state, including Turkish President Recep Tayyip Erdogan, the late President Mohamed Morsi of Egypt and Iranian President Mahmoud Ahmedinejad, Afghan President Hamid Karzai, Sudan’s Omar al Bashir, and Switzerland’s Micheline Calmy-Rey.

She is a permanent member of the Sant’ Egidio community (Vatican) for interfaith dialogue. She has worked with the United Nations’ High Commission for Refugees, and has paid several visits to Syrian refugee camps in Jordan.

She received an award from Mary Robinson, former President of Ireland at Burj al-Arab Hotel in Dubai, and this is a prize that reflects the important role played by women in the Al Jazeera media channel in all areas of editorial work, technical and field.
