= Zahia Rahmani =

French-Algerian author, curator, and art historian

- زاهية رحمانى
- Born: 1962 (age 63–64); Algeria
- Occupations: Art curator, novelist

Zahia Rahmani (born 1962) is a French-Algerian author, curator, and art historian.

== Early life ==
Rahmani was born in Algeria in 1962 and is of Berber heritage. She spoke only Kabyle until she was five-years old and her family migrated to France in 1967. Rahmani's father was a Harki. Rahmani and her family spent six months in the Saint-Maurice de l'Ardoise camp for repatriated Harkis and their families. With the help of some French friends, the family settled in Beauvais. Rahmani's older brother died in 1971.

== Books ==
Rahmani is the author of a trilogy of novels that explore themes of banishment and alienation. The first in this series is her 2003 work Moze deals with Harki identity and her father's 1991 suicide. Rahmani's 2005 semi-autobiographical work Musulman, Roman (Muslim: a Novel) explores the stereotypes surrounding Muslim identity in France and issues surrounding immigration. Muslim: a Novel was the 2020 winner of the Albertine Prize. The final work in this trilogy is her memoir France récit d’une enfance (France, story of a childhood).

== Art curation ==
Rahmani is director of the Research Program on Art and Globalization at the Institut National d'Histoire de l'Art. She created the graduate research program at École Nationale des Beaux-Arts and was director from 1999 to 2002. She was the curator of the exhibit Made in Algeria, Genealogy of a Territory which was showcased at the Museum of Civilizations of Europe and the Mediterranean until May 2016. Rahmani curated Seismography of Struggle, a collection of non-European cultural and critical journals.
