= Myriam Ben =

Algerian artist, writer (1928–2001)

Myriam Ben (10 October 1928 – 19 November 2001) was an Algerian activist, novelist, poet, and painter.

== Early life ==
Marylise Ben Haïm was born in Algiers on October 10, 1928. Her father Moses Ben Haïm was of Judaized Berber descent and was a communist who had served in the French army during the October Revolution, and her mother Sultana Stora, was an Andalusian Jewish musician. She was raised in a non-religious household, recalling later that she was seven years old before she realised her family was Jewish. In 1940, the Vichy French regime revoked the 19th century Crémieux Decree, so depriving Jewish Algerians of citizenship and resulting in Ben's expulsion from the lycée she had been attending in Algiers. She briefly attended a Jewish school, Ecole Maïmonide, but completed her education at home due to her father's opposition to Zionism. Ben notes in her memoir, Quand les cartes sont truquées, she was described as "Juive-Indigène", or "Native Jew" on her wartime identity card.

== Social and political justice ==
Though French citizenship for Algerian Jews was restored in 1943, Ben was now active as an "advocate for the rights of the so-called indigenous poor". At 14, she became the president of the Young Communists. She was also active in the Women's Union, and through the organisation's sponsorship became a school teacher in the town of Miliana. She and her fellow teachers instructed the students —mostly Muslim and impoverished— but also endeavored to raise their political consciousness and promote a decolonized sense of history.

In 1946, Ben expressed an interest in enrolling in the Aero Club of Algiers, but her father was against it. She was still considered a minor as she was under 21 years old, so had to wait five years to take up flying. In 1951, after 15 hours of flight lessons, she was awarded her pilot's licence. She is considered to be the first qualified woman pilot in Algeria. To pay for her flying lessons, she piloted introductory flights for potential new club members, although some people were wary of a woman pilot. This did not prevent her from learning how to fly aerobatics with the chief pilot at the Aero Club, a veteran of the Escadrille d'Etampes.

In 1952, Ben received her first assignment as a teacher at a school in the village of Aboutville (now called Aïn El Hadjar, Bouïra). It was a poor village and the school was in bad condition but she was enthusiastic about her role. When parents were ashamed to send their children to school because they had no shoes, Ben would go to fetch them. From 1954, Marylise's political commitments forced her to go underground and she stopped flying.

Ben supported the anti-French National Liberation Front (FLN) from the beginning of the Algerian War of Independence, and was a member of Maquis Rouge, making arms deliveries. The French government considered her a criminal and sentenced her, in absentia, to 20 years of hard labor; however, she was never captured and years later would be forgiven. When the war ended in 1962, Ben became a member of the independent Algerian government.

== Art and literature ==
In 1967, Ben began her artistic career as a poet, short-story writer, novelist, and painter. She published a number of collections of poetry, a collection of short stories (Ainsi naquit un homme, 1982), and the novel Sabrina (1986), her longest work. Sabrina told the story of two Muslims in love who were raised French and faced difficulties adapting to the new Algerian government. The French writer, translator, and scholar Albert Bensoussan thinks Ben used the characters of Sabrina to explore the displacement she experienced with French culture in an independent Algeria.

Ben's dramatic work, "Leïla, poème scénique en deux actes et un prologue," from Ben's collection, Leïla: Les enfants du mendiant, centers the heroine, Leila, a moudjahida. Caroline E. Kelley reads this work as a reinterpretation of the story of Antigone.

Ben was also celebrated for her abstract paintings.

== Retirement to France ==
In 1991, as Algeria entered a period of civil war, Ben moved to France. In Ben's novella, Nora, she writes about a hope for an Algeria where girls have "equal access to education". She dreamed of a utopian future society for Algeria that was inclusive.

She continued to write and paint until her death in 2001.

== Publications ==
- Le soleil assassiné, L'Harmattan, Paris, 2002. ISBN 2-7475-2176-1 (poetry)
- Au carrefour des sacrifices, L'Harmattan, Paris, 2000.ISBN 2738413005 (poetry)
- Quand les cartes sont truquées, L'Harmattan, Paris, 2000. ISBN 2738478654 (memoir)
- Leïla: Les enfants du mendiant, L'Harmattan, Paris, 1998. ISBN 2738468942 (play)
- Ainsi naquit un homme, L'Harmattan, Paris, 1993. ISBN 2738419240
- Sabrina, ils t'ont volé ta vie, L'Harmattan, Paris, 1992. ISBN 2858027080 (novel)
- Sur le chemin de nos pas, L'Harmattan, Paris, 1984. (poetry)
- L'âme de Sabrina, L'Harmattan, Paris, 2001. (short story)
