= Zoubeida Bittari =

Algerian writer (born 1939)

Zoubeïda Bittari
- Born: Louise Ali-Rachedi; 1939 (age 86–87); Algeria
- Occupation: Writer
- Children: 1

Signature
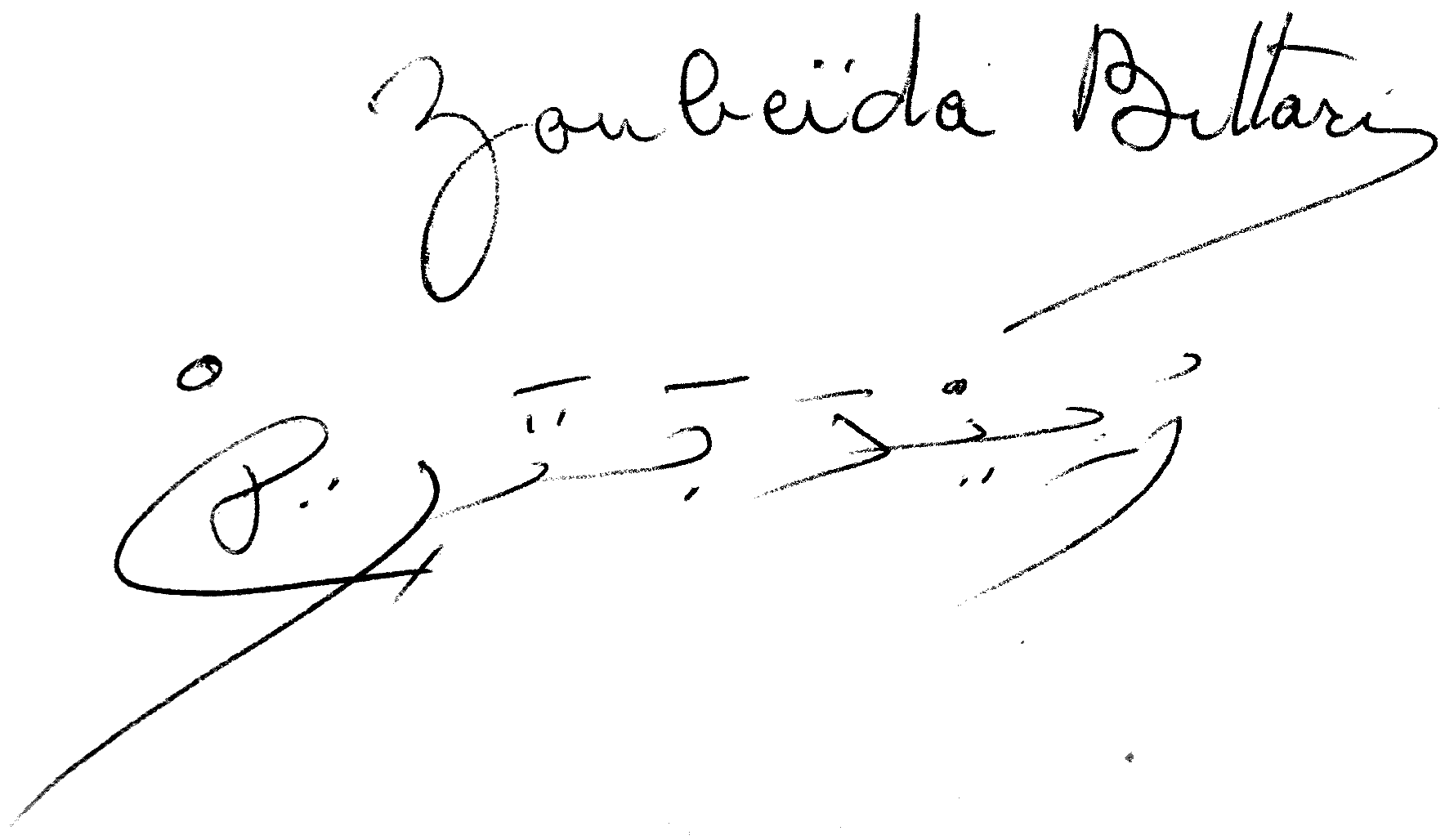

Zoubeïda Bittari (born 1939) is the pen name of Louise Ali-Rachedi, an Algerian woman writer who wrote O, My Muslim Sisters, Weep, published in 1964 in Paris, France. This book had a significant impact on the solidarity of her Muslim sisters.

== Early life ==
Zouebeïda Bittari was born into a lower-middle-class family in Algeria. She attended a French-run school. When she was twelve years old, her parents withdrew her from school in order to be married. Child marriage was a common practice; however, it was resented and discussed by many women such as Huda Sha'arawi.

At thirteen years old, Bittari had a child. However, Bittari's mother-in-law took her son away a year later after Bittari was repudiated. Later, Zouebeïda went to France to be able to write freely about her struggles and rebellions.

== O, My Muslim Sisters, Weep ==
Bittari's early life and marriage are reflected in her writing. Zoubeïda published her book: O mes soeurs musulmanes pleurez! or O, My Muslim Sisters, Weep, when she was twenty-five years old. The book revolves around her life "expressing a sense of release and euphoria that comes with emergent consciousness and acts of defiance." Although the entire book has not been translated, a translated excerpt named "The Voice of Happiness" can be found in Opening the Gates: An Anthology of Arab Feminist Writing.

Bittari's book takes place during the Algerian War, War on Independence, and it introduces literature that would later be published criticizing the revolution and the outcome on polygamy and divorce. The French are identified as being Algerian women writer supporters. Zoubeida's book is one of the first to show that Algerian society was influenced and formed with French impact. It was not possible to separate Algerians from their colonial past with French Algeria.

As stated earlier, Zoubeïda Bittari's book portrays a sense of release and euphoria. The woman in the book begins by going on excursions with her son. By doing so, she begins her quest for greater freedom. She visits the dentist late, and upon returning, she is labeled a whore and locked out of her home by her husband. She believes this is a release and she becomes euphoric about the situation. Although she regrets leaving her son with her husband, she is released in order to gain her freedom and independence.
