= Aïcha Lemsine =

Algerian writer

Personal details
- Born: 1942 (age 83–84) Tébessa, Algeria
- Party: Women's World Organization for Rights, Literature, and Development
- Profession: Writer, Lecturer, Freelance Journalist, International Speaker

Lemsine, the pen name of Aïcha Laidi (born 1942), is an Algerian writer writing in French.

She was born in the region of the Berber Nememchas of Tébessa and is an advocate for women's rights. She has been vice-president of the Women's World Organization for Rights, Literature, and Development and served on the PEN club's International Women's Committee.

== Biography ==
Aïcha is the author of novels and essays, and she has also written for the Algerian press and abroad. She is an international speaker, specialized in the history of Islam, political Islamism and the rights of Muslim women. she was regularly invited to participate in seminars and congresses around the world. Her husband, Ahmed Laïdi, was the Algerian ambassador to Spain (1965–1970), ), Jordan (1977–1984), in Great Britain and Ireland (1984–1988) and Mexico (1988–1991).

Lemsine's first two novels are based on events around the time of the Algerian War of Independence. Her work has been translated into Spanish, Portuguese, Arabic and English.

In 1995, she was awarded a Hellman-Hammett Grant by Human Rights Watch to support her work.

Lemsine married the diplomat Ahmed Laidi.

The name Lemsine is constructed from the Arabic letters (ل pronounced "lām") (L) and (س pronounced "sīn") (S), which are the first letters of her married and birth surnames.

== Roman La Chrysalide ==
In the novel La Chrysalide, Aïcha Lemsine describes the evolution of Algerian society and women, through the life of several generations of an Algerian family. This book, published in French, was then the first novel of an Algerian woman, fourteen years after the national independence of Algeria, to expose the contradiction between the reality of the condition of women in her country and the Constitution proclaiming an "egalitarian socialism" where "Fundamental freedoms and human and citizen rights are guaranteed. Any discrimination based on prejudices of sex, race or profession is prohibited (Art.39).

The book was banned. The ministry of "habous and Islamic affairs" sent gendarmes to withdraw "the Chrysalis" of the "Éditions des Femmes" stand participating in the first international exhibition.The censorship of her books is still subject to invisibility in Algeria, unlike their distribution in countries in the rest of the world.

- Graebner, Seth. Encyclopedia of African Literature. New York and London: Routledge, 2003.

== Selected works ==
- La chrysalide: Chroniques algeriennes, novel (1976), translated into English as "The Chrysalis"
- Ciel de porphyre, novel (1978), translated into English as "Beneath a Sky of Porphyry"
- Ordalie des voix, essay (1983)
- Au Cœur du Hezbollah, essay (2008) ("In the heart of Hezbollah")
