= Latifa Ben Mansour =

Algerian writer (born 1950)

Latifa Ben Mansour (Arabic: لطيفة بن منصور) (born 1950 in Tlemcen) is an Algerian writer, psychoanalyst, and linguist. Her work deals with issues such as the role of women in Algerian society, Islamic extremism, storytelling, trauma, and memory.

== Biography ==
Having studied Linguistics at the École Normale Supérieure d'Alger, where she obtained her Ph.D. in the subject, Ben Mansour went on to teach it at the University of Paris III and communications at the Conservatoire National des Arts et Métiers.

She received the Prix méditerranéen de la nouvelle in 1996 for her short story "Le Cocu Cadi". Her novel, La Prière de la peur, 1997 (ed. La Différence) has been awarded the Prix Beur FM Méditerranée.

== Specific works ==
Latifa Ben Mansour's novel La Prière de la peur tells the story of Hanan, a young woman returning to her family in Algeria after living several years in France. When her plane lands, the airport is attacked by extremists and Hanan is wounded. Her legs must be amputated and she suffers from trauma associated with the attack. The novel centers around her account of her life and works and her close friendship with her cousin, also named Hanan.

Le Chant du lys et du basilic is about a young girl named Meriem who is injured in a mysterious accident. While in the hospital listening to her family around her but unable to respond, Meriem recalls the major events in her life leading up to the accident in an effort to remember what happened. The novel explores the lives of women in contemporary Algeria, giving attention to issues such as the education of girls.

== Complete bibliography ==
- Trente-trois Tours à son Turban (play, Rencontres Théâtrales du Niger, Mar 2003, directed by Boubacar Ibrahim Dambagi)
- Frères musulmans, frères féroces: Voyages dans l'enfer du discours islamiste (non-fiction, 2002)
- L'Année de l'Eclipse (novel, Calmann-Lévy, 2001)
- La Prière de la Peur (novel, La Différence, 1997)
- Le Chant du Lys et du Basilic (novel, J.-C. Lattès, 1990, 2nd edition by La Différence in 1998)
- Trente-trois Tours à son Turban (play, Actes-Sud-Papiers)

== Critical articles ==
- Jane E. Evans. 2006. "Widowhood, Motherhood, Selfhood in Latifa Ben Mansour's L'année de l'éclipse" The Selected Works of Jane E. Evans. Available at: http://works.bepress.com/jane_evans/14
- Mertz-Baumgartner, B. (2001) ‘Le rôle de la mémoire chez quelques écrivaines algériennes de l'autre rive’ In Bonn, C., Redouane, N. and Bénayoun-Szmidt, Y. (Eds.) Algérie: Nouvelles Écritures. Colloque international de l'Université York, Glendon, et de l'Université de Toronto 13 - 14 - 15 - 16 Mai 1999 Paris: L'Harmattan.
