= Samira Negrouche =

Algerian writer

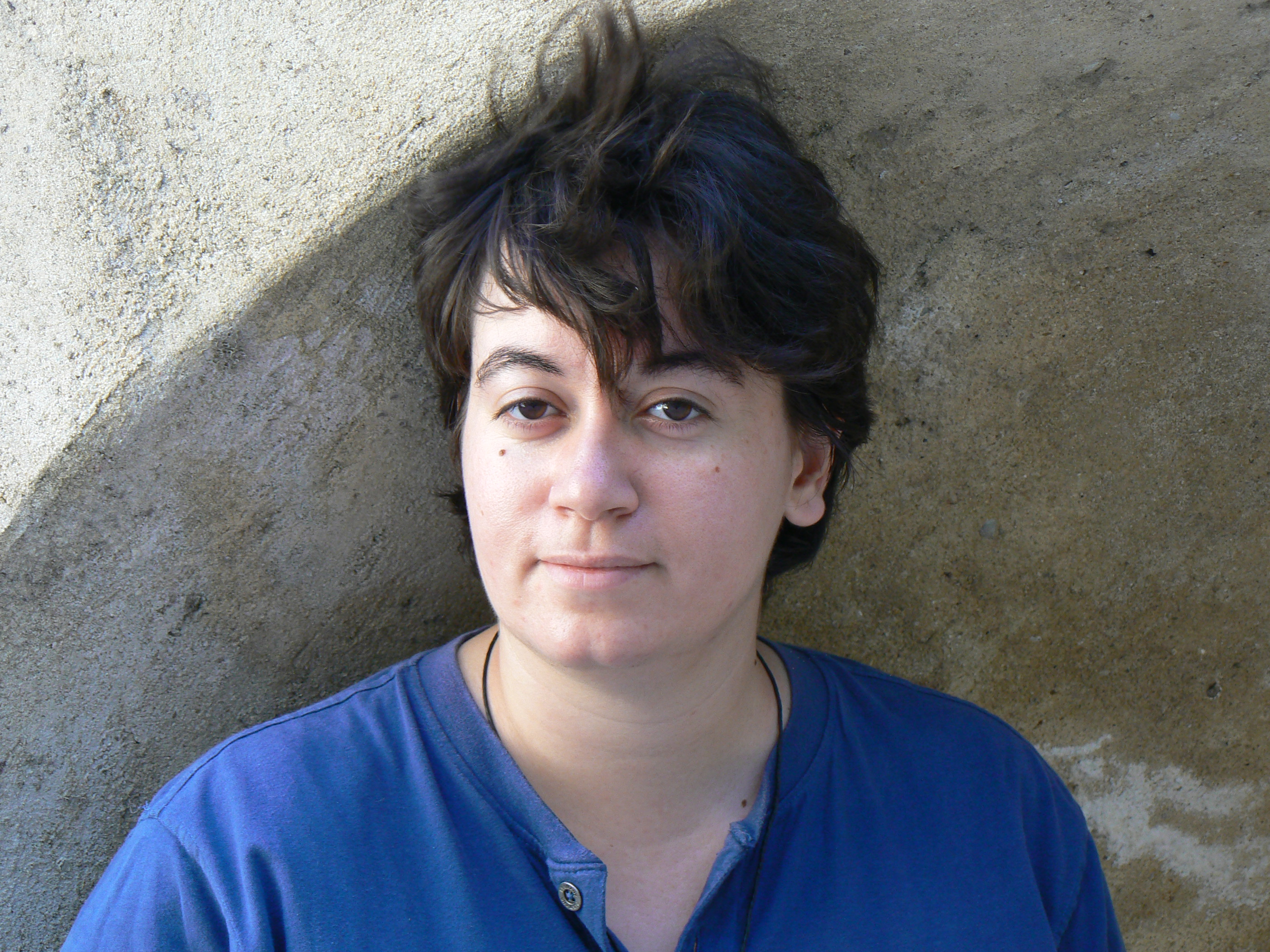
- Born: 13 September 1980 (age 46); Algiers, Algeria
- Occupations: writer, poet, essayist
- Writing career
- Movements: Francophone literature Algerian literature

Samira Negrouche, francophone Algerian writer and poet, born in Algiers, on September 13, 1980. Also a Medical Doctor, she lives and works in Algeria. (Note: Part of the author's biography is taken from: Samira Negrouche, Le Jazz des oliviers, Blida: Editions du Tell, 2010.)

== Career ==
Negrouche is mainly known for her poetry, but also for her prose, her academic and dramatic texts, and her other creative writings. Furthermore, she translates Algerian contemporary poetry written in Arabic and other regional languages called "minoritaries" into English and French. Also, she works in various fields, such as video, theater, dance, photography and diverse visual arts expressions.

The author received a scholarship from the Centre national du livre to pursue a stage in France during 2004 and 2005. In 2009, in Lyon, performing with the Greek musician and singer Angélique Ionatos in "Without precaution ..." she influenced public opinion. In 2012, she edited contemporary Algerian poetry written in French published by éditions l'Amandier under the title "Quand l'Amandier refleurira"

Negrouche is regularly invited to participate in international literary events, in which she often reads poetry and coordinates and manages different activities.

Negrouche is a member of the international committee to the festival "Voice of the Mediterranean" Lodève and general secretary to the Algeria PEN club. She also creates CADMOS, a cultural association for the preservation of Mediterranean cultural patrimony.

Her poetry has been translated into more than twenty languages among those books in Spanish, Italian and Bulgarian.

On being asked whether the Arab Spring helped break the culture of fear for writers, Negrouche has said:

The Arab Spring revealed the Arabs to the world and to themselves; they are neither homogeneous nor resigned and silent societies. It’s too bad that these hopes have been quashed. There is an entire world in between revolt and social justice, and even more so in societies that have been silenced for far too long; but this isn’t a reason either to accept the Establishment nor to provoke revolts that are premature. These societies have paid a heavy price and I hope they will be helped in the future to rebuild themselves with true respect for their aspirations and cultural richness.

Negrouche on how her writing connects to other places within the Arab world:

I wrote seven fragments in Seven Little Jasmine Monologues with seven cities in the Arab world in mind, including Algiers, as a form of solidarity, a way of drawing the outlines of an ordeal that we are going through together, the outlines of which I recognize. But there is no uniformity. What we call the Arab world can only have a meaning in the future if it is considered in its cultural, historical, and linguistic plurality. And this isn’t contradictory to our ties and our kinship.

== Bibliography ==
- Faiblesse n’est pas de dire… Algiers: Barzakh, 2001.
- Les Vagues du silence, by Yasminah Salih, Alger: Al Ikhtilef, 2002. (Translation)
- L’opéra cosmique, Algiers: Al Ikhtilef, 2003.
- Iridienne, Echalas: Color Gang, 2005.
- A l'ombre de Grenade, Toulouse A.P l'étoile, 2003; Lettres Char-nues, Algiers 2006.
- Cabinet secret, Echalas: Color Gang, 2007.
- Le Jazz des oliviers, Blida: Editions du Tell, 2010.
- Quand l'Amandier refleurira, Anthology, 2012.
- Six arbres de fortune autour de ma baignoire, Mazette, Paris 2017.
- " Quai 2I1, partition à trois axes", Mazette, Paris 2019
- "Traces", Fidel Anthelme X, Marseille 2021
- "Stations", Chèvre-feuille étoilée, Montpellier 2023
- "J'habite en mouvement, éditions Barzakh, 2023

== Anthologies and joint works ==
- J’ai embrassé l'aube d'été, Villeurbanne: Editions La Passe du vent, 2004.
- L’Heure injuste !, Villeurbanne: Editions La Passe du vent, 2005.
- Départements et territoires d'outre-ciel, Villeurbanne: Editions La Passe du vent, 2006.
- Dans le privilège du soleil et du vent, Villeurbanne: Editions La Passe du vent, 2007.
- Pour Tous !, Villeurbanne: Editions La Passe du vent, 2009.
- Triangle : Poésies en traduction, Alger: Alpha, 2009.
- Samira Negrouche (ed.), Lignes d'horizons, Blida: Editions du Tell, 2010.
- Samira Negrouche (ed.), Quand l'amandier refleurira, Anthologie de poètes algériens contemporains, Paris: Editions de l'Amandier, 2012

== Translations of her work ==
- "Il palo elettrico soltanto", tr. to Italian by Giovanni Dettori, in "Soliana", n°1, (Cagliari), nov. 2007. Cultural review, p. 21-25.
- Jazz degli ulivi, translation into Italian by Annie Urselli, Alberobello, Italy: Poiesis Editrice, coll. Diwan della poesia, 2011.
- A ciento ochenta grados, translation to Spanish and preface by Carlos Alvarado-Larroucau, Rosario – Buenos Aires, Argentine: Gog y Magog, 2012.
- "Minus One", translated into English by Marilyn Hacker in Words Without Borders, Jan. 2019.
- "In the Shadow of Granada", translated into English by Marilyn Hacker in Words Without Borders, Jan. 2019.
- "The olive trees' Jazz and other poems", translated by Marilyn Hacker, Pleiades Press, USA 2020 (Shortlisted for the Dereck Walcott Prize for Poetry 2021 and shortlisted for the National Translation Award in Poetry ALTA 2021)
- "Solio", translated by Nancy Naomi Carlson, Seagull Books, India, 2024
