= Zehira Houfani =

Algerian writer (born 1952)

- Born: September 16, 1952; M'Kira
- Website: zehira-houfani.com

Zehira Houfani-Berfas (Arabic: زهيرة حوفاني برفاس; born September 16, 1952) is an Algerian French-language writer living in Canada. She may be the first woman to publish a detective novel in Algeria.

Zehira Houfani was born on September 16, 1952 in M'Kira, Algeria. Her first novel was Les Pirates du désert (Pirates of the Desert) (1986), set in Tamanrasset in southern Algeria and written in the style of hard-boiled detective authors Dashiell Hammett and Raymond Chandler. She abandoned detective fiction during the Algerian Civil War.

She moved to Canada in 1994. She worked as a peace activist, visiting Iraq to document civilian casualties during the Iraq War and demanding the resignation of Algerian president Abdelaziz Bouteflika.

== Bibliography ==
- Les pirates du désert, Alger : ENAL, 1986, 135 p.
- Le portrait du disparu, Alger : ENAL, 1986, 74 p.
- L'incomprise, Alger : ENAL, 1989, 140 p.
- Lettre d'une musulmane aux Nord-Américaines, Montréal : Éditions Écosociété, 2002, 148 p.; 19 cm. ISBN 978-2-921561-80-8
- Jenan, la condamnée d'Al-Mansour, Montréal : Lux, 2008, 158 p.; 21 cm. ISBN 978-2-89596-067-6
- La honte se vit seule, Tizi Ouzou [Algérie]: éditions Frantz Fanon, 2016, 203 pages. ISBN 978-9931-572-14-5
- Françafrique, la matrice du chaos africain - Stratégie coloniale d’échec des indépendances, Éditions L'Harmattan, collection Questions contemporaines, 2024, Broché - 172 pages. ISBN 978-2-336-43430-8
