= Leïla Sebbar =

French-Algerian author (born 1941)

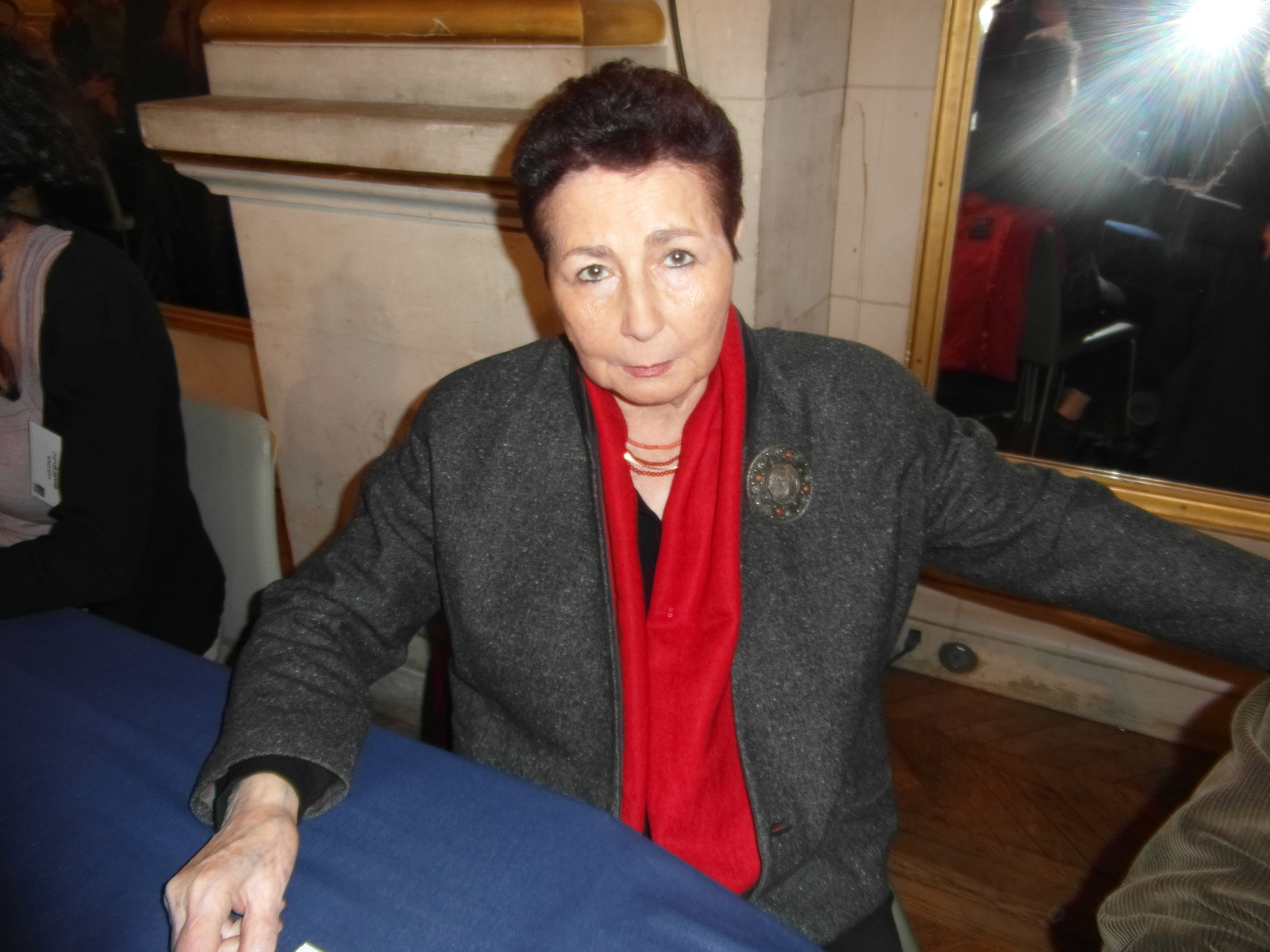
- Born: 1941 (age 83–84)
- Occupation: Novelist

Leïla Sebbar (born 1941) is a French-Algerian author.

== Early life ==
Leïla Sebbar was born on 9 November 1941, in Aflou. The daughter of a French mother and an Algerian father, she spent her youth in French Algeria before leaving aged seventeen for Paris, where she now lives.

== Career ==
Sebbar writes in French about the relationship between France and Algeria and often juxtaposes the imagery of both countries to show the difference in cultures between the two. She deals with a variety of topics, and either adopts a purely fictional approach or uses psychology to make her point. Many of Sebbar's novels express the frustrations of the Beur, the second generation of Maghribi youth who were born and raised in France and who have not yet integrated into French society.

Her book Parle mon fils, parle à ta mère (1984; Talk my son, talk to your mother), illustrates the absence of dialogue between two generations who do not speak the same language. The novel tells the story of the final day of a dying man who came from Algeria to France as a young man seeking work. It depicts the story of his youth and shows his viewpoint on the Muslim society and the "3 witches". The reader comes to realise that the man in the story is not fearful of those "witches" but just of dying alone, without another Muslim by his side to read to him the prayer of the dead.

Sebbar never names her characters to keep a sense of anonymity and mysteriousness and it could be said that it does not restrict the story to one personal account but it could relate to anyone and shows the very common viewpoint of those seeking asylum.

Sebbar was awarded the Officer of the Order of Arts and Letters in 2016.

== Selected publications ==
- An Algerian Childhood: A Collection of Autobiographical Narratives. St. Paul, MN: Ruminator Books, 2001. Translated from the French by Marjolijn de Jager. ISBN 1886913498 OCLC 45375005
- Arabic as a Secret Song. Charlottesville: University of Virginia Press, 2015. Translated by Skyler Artes. ISBN 9780813937564 OCLC 893452423
- Confessions of a Madman. Victoria, TX: Dalkey Archive Press, 2016. Translated by Rachel Crovello. ISBN 9781564787606 OCLC 926743720
- The Seine Was Red: Paris, October 1961. Bloomington: Indiana University Press, 2008. Translated by Mildred Mortimer. ISBN 9780253352460 OCLC 216935804
- Sherazade. London: Quartet, 1999. Translated by Dorothy S. Blair. ISBN 0704381257 OCLC 50381512
- Silence on the Shores. Lincoln: University of Nebraska Press, 2000. Translated and with an introduction by Mildred Mortimer. ISBN 0803242859 OCLC 43607481

== General references ==
- du Plessis, Nancy (1989) 'Leïla Sebbar, Voice of Exile', World Literature Today 63: 3 (Summer 1989), 415-17
- Engelking, T. L. (2007). '"Shérazade" at the Museum: A Visual Approach to Teaching Leila Sebbar's Novel'. The French Review 80 (3), 620–635.
- Merini, R. (1999). Two major Francophone women writers, Assia Djébar and Leïla Sebbar: a thematic study of their works. Francophone cultures and literatures, v. 5. New York: P. Lang. ISBN 978-0-8204-2635-8
- Mortimer, Mildred (1988). 'Language and space in the fiction of Assua Djebar and Leila Sebbar', Research in African Literatures 19 (fall 1988), 301-11
- Mortimer, Mildred (1992). 'On the Road: Leïla Sebbar's fugitive heroines', Research in African Literatures 23: 2 (summer 1992), 195-201
- Parekh, P. N., & Jagne, S. F. (1998). Postcolonial African writers: a bio-bibliographical critical sourcebook. Westport, Conn: Greenwood Press.
- Vassallo, H. (2011). "Re-mapping Algeria(s) in France: Leïla Sebbar's Mes Algéries en France and Journal de mes Algéries en France", Modern & Contemporary France, 19, 2, pp. 129–145
