= Lynda Chouiten =

Algerian writer

- ليندة شويتن
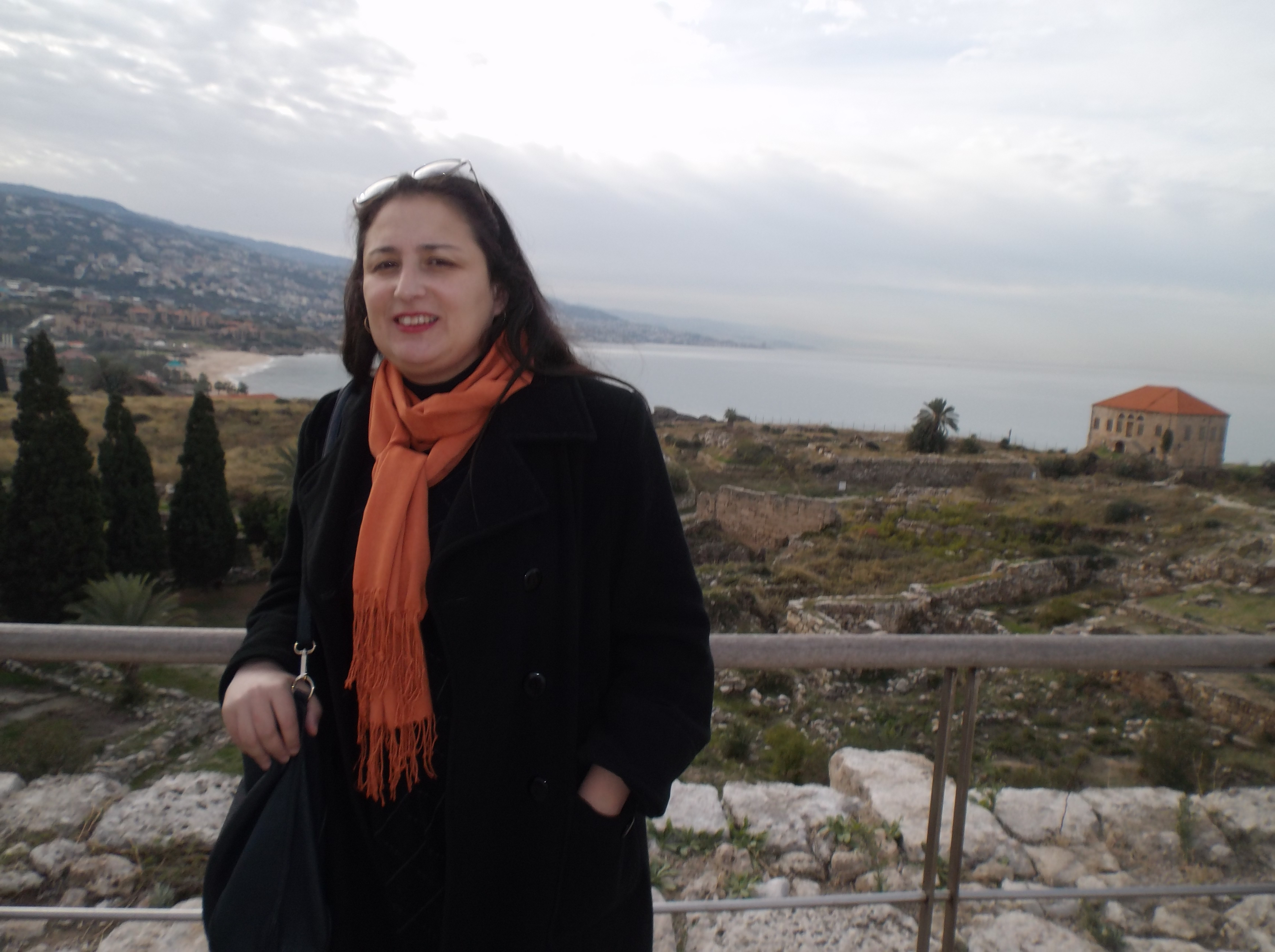
- Born: 1977 (age 48–49); Tizi Ouzou, Algeria
- Awards: Assia Djebar Great Prize; 2019 Une Valse

Academic background
- Education: National University of Ireland, Galway (PhD)

Academic work
- Discipline: Literature
- Sub-discipline: Francophone literature; Postcolonial literature; Comparative literature
- Institutions: University of Boumerdès

Lynda Chouiten (Arabic: ليندة شويتن; born 1977 in Tizi Ouzou) is an Algerian writer in French. She is the author of several books. She focuses on French and francophone cultures and literatures, postcolonial culture and literature, comparative literature, travel literature, Orientalism, cultural representation, literary theory, British literature and civilization (especially Victorian), discourse and power, and gender studies.

Chouiten was born in Tizi Ouzou, Algeria. She earned a PhD in French Studies from the Moore Institute at the National University of Ireland, Galway. She has been head of the Scientific Committee of the Department of Foreign Languages & Literatures at the University of Boumerdès since September 2015.

Her novel, Une Valse, won the 2019 Assia Djebar Great Prize.

== Works ==
- Isabelle Eberhardt
- Essays on the Discursive Constructions, Manifestations, and Subversions of Authority
- Translated poetry Just Above Silence (Juste au-dessus du silence) by Anna Greki
