= Batna 1 University =

University in Batna, Algeria

Coordinates: 35°32′27″N 6°08′56″E

University of Batna 1
- جامعة باتنة (Arabic); Université de Batna 1 (French)
- Other name: Batna 1 University
- Type: Public
- Established: 1977
- Rector: Abdeslam Dif
- Students: 19,000
- Location: Batna, Algeria
- Website: univ-batna.dz

The University of Batna 1 (French: Université de Batna 1, also named Université Colonel Hadj Lakhdar, Arabic: جامعة باتنة) is a public university in the city of Batna, Algeria. The university was originally created in 1977 as the University of Batna, before being split in 2015 into the University of Batna 1 and the University of Batna 2. It has four faculties and over 19,000 students.

== See also ==
- List of universities in Algeria
- Batna City
