= Rabia Djelti =

Algerian writer

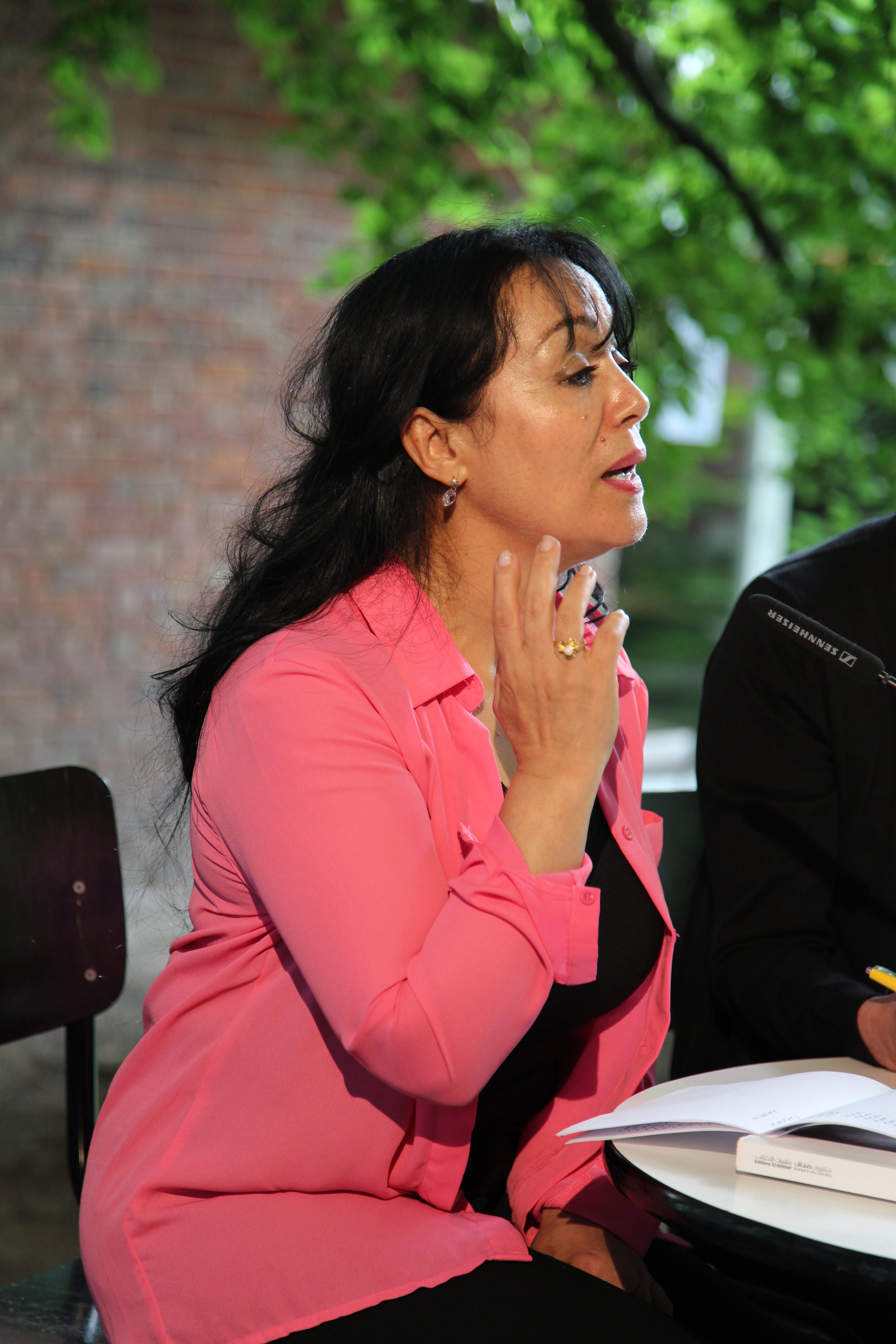
Rabia Djelti

Rabia Djelti (born 1954) is an Algerian writer, fluent in both Arabic and French. In 2002, for her poetry and novels, she was awarded the prize for Arabic literature in Abu-Dhabi. In addition to her writing, Djelti teaches literature at the University of Algiers.

== Biography ==
Born on 5 August 1954 in Nedroma, she went to primary school in Morocco before attending secondary school in Oran (1969–1975). From an early age, she was attracted to French literature, discovering the works of Baudelaire and Victor Hugo in her father's library. She started translating the books she liked best into Arabic. She graduated in literature from the University of Oran in 1979 before earning a doctorate in Damascus in 1990.

After marrying Amin Zaoui, she taught at the University of Oran until the early 1990s. Threatened by the Algerian Civil War, the couple left for France in 1995, returning in the year 2000.

After first working as a journalist, Djelti began writing poetry in Arabic in 1981, the most successful collections being Murmures du secret (2002) and Qui est-ce dans le miroir (2003), translated into French respectively by Abdellatif Laâbi and Rachid Boudjedra. In 2010, she began writing novels, including Le trône émaillé (2013) et Nostalgie à la menthe (2015). She explained that while her poems had each had a story to tell, she had always been tempted to write novels but it was only in 2010 that she finally began to do so.

== Personal life ==
Djelti is married to the Algerian writer Amin Zaoui. Their daughter, Lina Doran, is a singer-songwriter.
