= Leila Djabali =

Algerian intellectual and poet (born 1933)

- Born: 1933
- Known for: poetry
- Notable work: Pour mon tortionnaire, le Lieutenant D..

Leila Djabali (born 1933) is an Algerian intellectual and poet, who was imprisoned and tortured by the French colonial authorities during the Algerian War of Independence.

Her poem, Pour mon tortionnaire, le Lieutenant D.. (For My Torturer, Lieutenant D..., 1957), written while imprisoned at the Barberousse Prison in Algiers, vividly portrays multiple rapes in prison, and ends by describing the gentle everyday life of the torturer.

The poem has been anthologized in Women Poets of the World (1983), The Heinemann Book of African Women’s Poetry (1995), and Fire in the Soul: 100 Poems for Human Rights (2009).
