= Nassira Belloula =

Algerian journalist

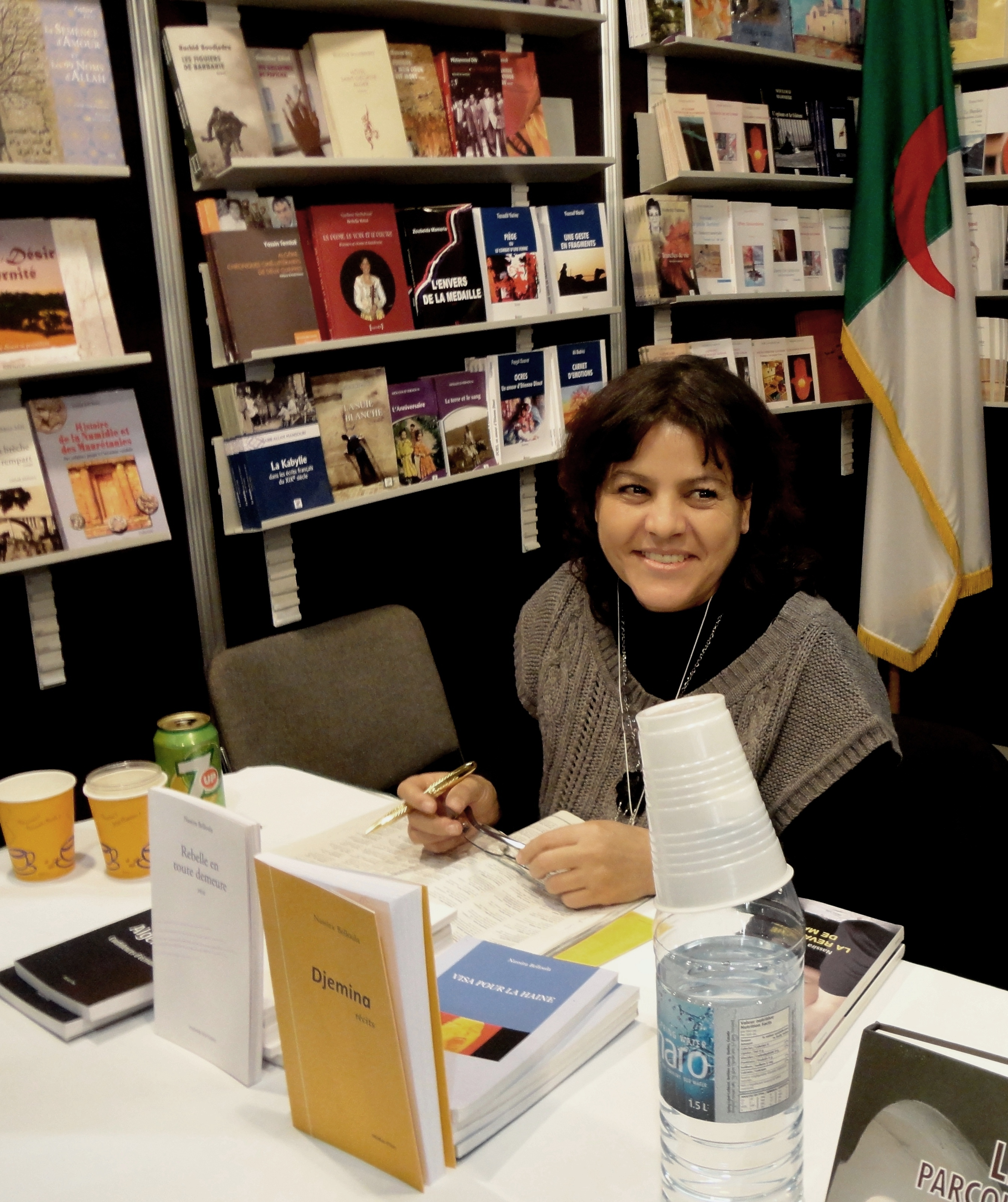
- Born: 17 February 1961 (age 65)
- Citizenship: Algeria
- Occupations: Journalist and French writer
- Known for: Founding member of the Algerian literacy magazine
- Notable work: Worked for Algerian newspapers and online news views.

Nassira Belloula (نصيرة بلولة) (born 13 February 1961 in Batna) is an Algerian feminist journalist and writer in French. She is the author of several books, novels, poems, essays, stories and news.

== Biography ==
Belloula joined the l’Ecole Nationale des Cadres de la Jeunesse in the 1980s. by passing the entrance exam. Belloula began practice as a freelance journalist in 1992. Beginning in 1994, she worked for Algerian newspapers and online news venues including Le Soir d’Algérie, Le Matin, La Nouvelle République, and Liberté. She is a founding member of the Algerian literary magazine, L’Ivrescq.

In 2010, Belloula moved to Montreal, Canada.

== Activism and Writing ==
Belloula's work deals most significantly with women's issues, including cultural and religious restrictions, education, social relations, traditions, confinement, and violence. She was a founding member of the executive board of the Algerian Human Rights Foundation of the Child and Adolescent (1993-1998). Her 2000 text, Algérie, le massacre des innocents, concerns itself with the massacre of Algerian civilians. She served two terms as a member of the Algerian Commission on Human Rights, an affiliate of the United Nations.

== Works ==
=== Poetry ===
- 1988: Les Portes du Soleil
- 2010: The Gates Of The Sun, translation of Les Portes du Soleil

=== Fiction ===
- 1998 : Le Revanche de May
- 2003 : Rebelle en toute demeure
- 2008 : Djemina
- 2008 : Visa pour la haine
- 2014 : Terre des femmes

=== Non-Fiction ===
- 2000 : Algérie, le massacre des innocents
- 2005 : Conversations à Alger, quinze auteurs se dévoilent
- 2006 : Les Belles Algériennes, confidences d'écrivaines
- 2009 : Soixante ans d'écriture féminine en Algérie

=== Anthologies ===
- 2008 : Arbres Bleus, fantasmes naufragés
- 2009 : Tamazgha francophone au Féminin
