= Maïssa Bey =

Algerian writer (born 1950)

Samia Benameur
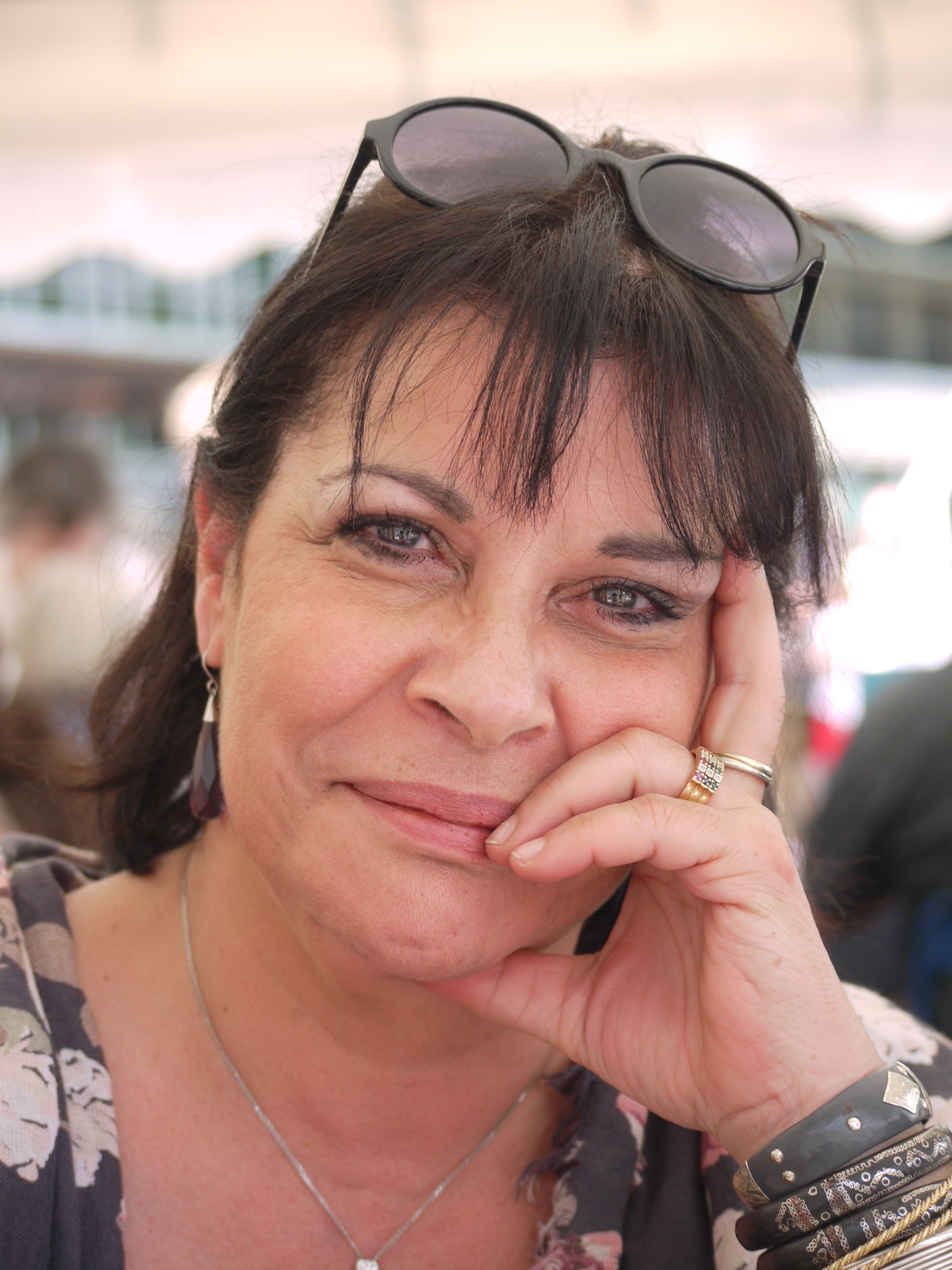
- Born: 1950 (age 75–76); Ksar Boukhari, Algeria
- Writing career
- Pen name: Maïssa Bey
- Language: French
- Genres: novel, short story

Samia Benameur (born 1950), better known by her pseudonym, Maïssa Bey, is an Algerian educator and writer.

== Life ==
She was born in Ksar Boukhari and teaches French in Sidi-Bel-Abbès in western Algeria. In 1996, she published her first novel Au commencement était la mer. Her story collection Nouvelles d'Algérie was published in 1998 and received the Grand Prix de la nouvelle of the Société des gens de lettres. Her 2001 novel Cette fille-là was awarded the Prix Marguerite Audoux. In 2005, she received the Grand Prix des libraires algériens for her work to date.

She was a co-founder of the Chèvre-feuille étoilée publishing house. In 2000, she helped establish Paroles et écriture, a cultural association of Algerian women.

== Selected works ==
- Au commencement était la mer, novel (1996)
- Nouvelles d'Algérie, stories (1998)
- Cette fille-là, novel (2001)
- Entendez-vous dans les montagnes, novel (2002); English translation, Do You Hear in the Mountains (2018)
- Surtout ne te retourne pas, novel (2005); English translation, Above All, Don't Look Back (2009)
- Sous le jasmin la nuit, stories (2004)
- Bleu, blanc, vert, novel (2006), received the Cezam Prix Littéraire Inter CE
- Pierre, Sang, Papier ou Cendre, novel (2008), received the Grand Prix du roman francophone SILA
- L'une et l'autre, autobiography (2009)
- Puisque mon cœur est mort, novel (2009)
