= Veronica Bennett =

English children's novelist

- Born: 1953 (age 72–73); England, United Kingdom
- Occupations: Novelist, short story writer
- Writing career
- Language: English
- Genre: Children's
- Notable work: Dandelion and Bobcat

Veronica Bennett is a children's novelist. She previously worked part-time as an English Lecturer and now writes fiction full-time. She graduated from University College, Cardiff in 1975 with an Honors degree in English. She began her writing career as a freelance journalist, but soon moved into fiction. Her first book, Monkey, was published in 1998 and was acclaimed by The Times Educational Supplement as "an impressively well-written and audacious debut". Veronica Bennett is married with two children, and currently resides in Middlesex.

== Bibliography ==
- Monkey (1998)
- The Boy-free Zone (1999)
- Dandelion and Bobcat (2000)
- Fish Feet (2002)
- Angelmonster (2005)
- Cassandra's Sister (2006)
- Shakespeare's Apprentice (2007)
