= Esmeralda Labye =

Belgian journalist and presenter

Esmeralda Labye (born 25 February 1973) is a Belgian journalist and presenter at Belgian public broadcaster RTBF. She holds a degree in journalism and communications from the Université libre de Bruxelles. Before, she had studied Dramatic arts at the Conservatory of Tournai.

== Career ==
Labye debuted at Tournai-based regional broadcaster Notélé, before joining RTBF in 1996. Today she covers international news, and has reported from countries all over the world including Afghanistan, Iraq, Palestine, Georgia, Sri Lanka, Brazil, and Pakistan.
