= Beppe Costa =

Italian poet, novelist and publisher (1941–2026)

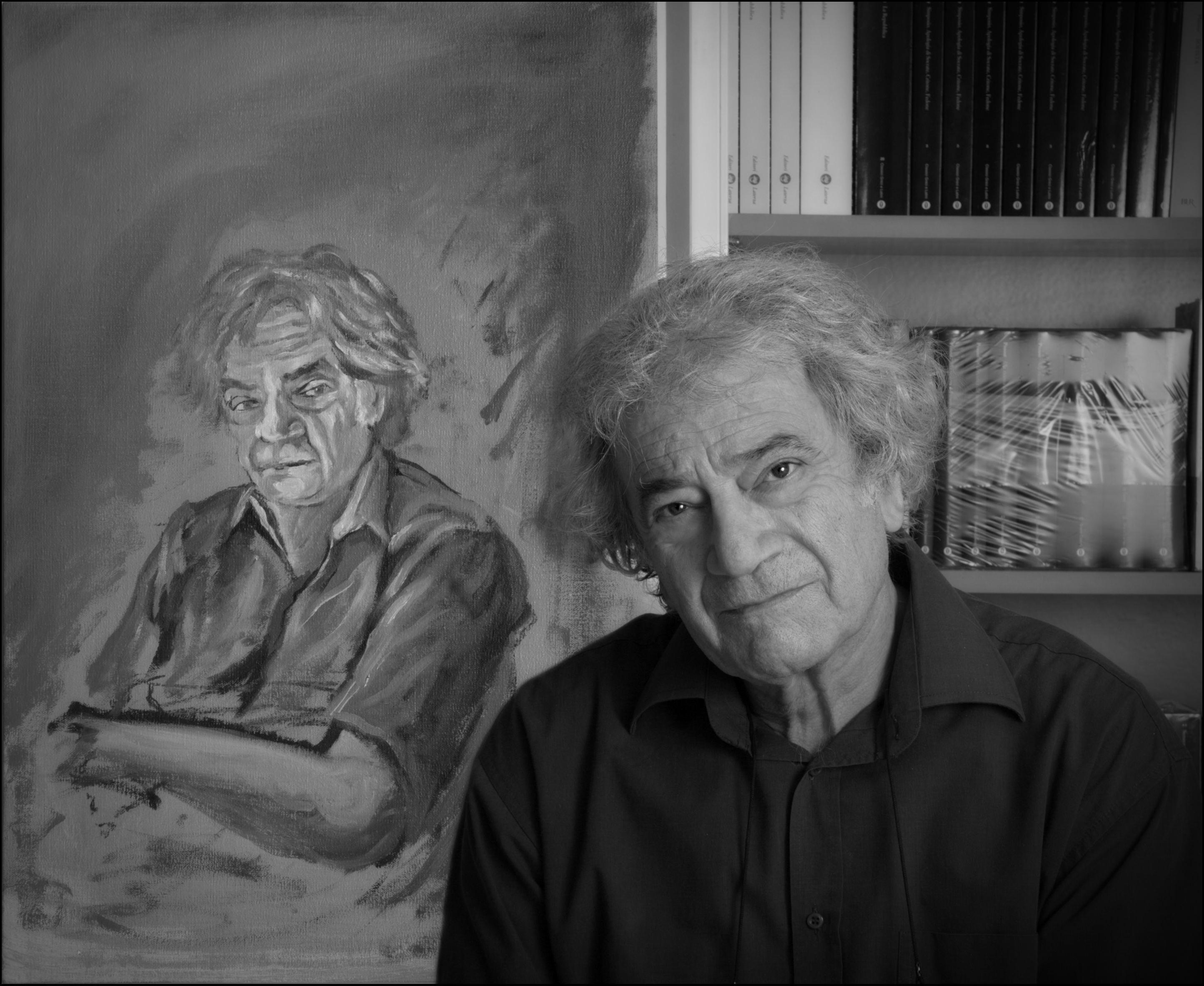
- Costa in Pellicanolibri library, photo by Dino Ignani
- Born: 25 August 1941; Catania, Italy
- Died: 10 June 2026 (aged 84); Rome, Italy
- Occupations: Poet; writer; essayist; publisher

Beppe Costa (25 August 1941 – 10 June 2026) was an Italian poet, novelist, and publisher.

== Life and career ==
=== Early life ===
Despite being born into a poor family, Costa grew up in an environment rich in books. He published his first volume of poems in 1970 (Una poltrona comoda, Giuseppe Di Maria editore), characterized, like the others that followed, by the theme of love and nonconformity.

Costa wrote and published two tour guides, first at local level, Catania, Guida ai monumenti, and the second at regional level, Sicilia, Guida ai monumenti, both with Muglia publisher. He also translated two books of the playwright Fernando Arrabal.

In 1978 he met the poet Dario Bellezza, which would begin with poetry readings and book presentations all around Italy, using everywhere available, including squares, bars, libraries, and theatres.

=== Successes ===
Costa reached fame with the book Romanzo siciliano, the autobiographical story of an intellectual Sicilian in his struggle in the south and with the Mafia. In the United States the novel was reviewed by World Literature Today.

He wrote, until 1985, articles for Giornale del Sud and in Siciliani, both directed by Giuseppe Fava. In Giornale di Sicilia he published interviews with Alberto Moravia, Enzo Jannacci, Léopold Sédar Senghor, and Leo Ferré. He also participated to the radio program of poetry by RadioRai named Zenit & Nadir.

In 1985 he finally left Sicily. He published other collections of poems and received the Akesineide prize for Fatto d'amore and Canto d'amore.

In 1989, he won the Alfonso Gatto prize with the collection Impaginato per affetto. The preface is by Giacinto Spagnoletti, who, first recognised the artistic talent of Pier Paolo Pasolini. He appreciated the poetry of Costa, as expressing the pain of living, the need to love and the difficulty of harmonising this with the reality of another world.

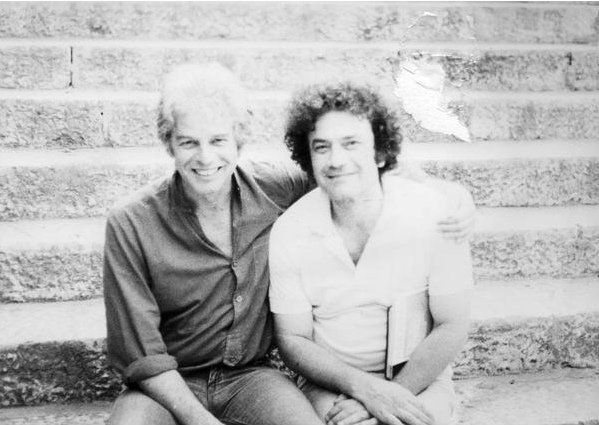
Beppe Costa and Alejandro Jodorowsky at Taormina Film Fest

His poems were read by actors like Lina Bernardi, Arnoldo Foà, Milena Mancini, Viviana Piccolo, Sara Pusceddu e Valeria Di Francesco and set to music, among others, by da Giovanni Renzo, Alessandra Celletti, Nicola Alesini, Giuliano Perticara, Mario Pettenati, and Gianluca Attanasio. Fascinated by the musical innovations, Beppe Costa recorded a cd with Giovanni Renzo. This experience led him quickly to make visual poetry with photos and music videos mostly of René Aubry and Alessandra Celletti. He inaugurated, with Beatrice Niccolai, in 2008, the exhibition Malaspinarte.

In 2008 the encounter with the poet and composer Mario Salis contributes to greater synergy to the Italian edition of the Teranova Festival, which was born in France and founded by Mario Salis under the leadership of Fernando Arrabal, has already seen the participation of Lawrence Ferlinghetti, Patrice Leconte and of the same Arrabal.

In March 2010, as part of Beppe Costa's cycle of meetings, Fernando Arrabal visited Rome and spent two days with the Poets From Space, a group of poets from different Italian regions, chosen by Fabio Barcellandi.

Came out in June 2010, for Multimedia Publishing (Casa della Poesia from Baronissi – Salerno), his new collection of poems Anche ora che la luna, with a letter from Adele Cambria and Lia Levi.
From 2011 began the partnership with the poet Stefania Battistella creating the new reading/show: di me, di altri, ancora.

=== Publishing activity ===
In 1976 he founded the publishing house Pellicanolibri, in promoting his work as editor of artists bashful, awkward or marginalized.

He rediscovered and published the stories of Luigi Capuana: Si conta e si racconta (Pellicanolibri, 1989) and a volume that Federico De Roberto dedicated to his city, Catania. He also published the translated texts of the contemporary French philosopher Gaston Bachelard.

From a meeting with Jodorowsky, the idea of publishing the book on the Panic Movement, a surrealist movement founded by Alejandro Jodorowsky with Fernando Arrabal and Roland Topor. In 1980 he translated and published the first work of the writer Manuel Vázquez Montalbán, Manifesto subnormal. It will be also editor of Gisèle Halimi, Luce d'Eramo, Alberto Moravia, Dario Bellezza, Goliarda Sapienza, Arnoldo Foà, Angelo Maria Ripellino.

Since 1982, with the poet Dario Bellezza gives life to the series Inediti rari e diversi in order to report the authors excluded from the Italian literary society, like Anna Maria Ortese.

=== Beppe Costa and Bacchelli law ===
In 1985 manages together with Adele Cambria to apply for the first time the Legge Bacchelli in favor of Anna Maria Ortese.

== Shows and tours ==
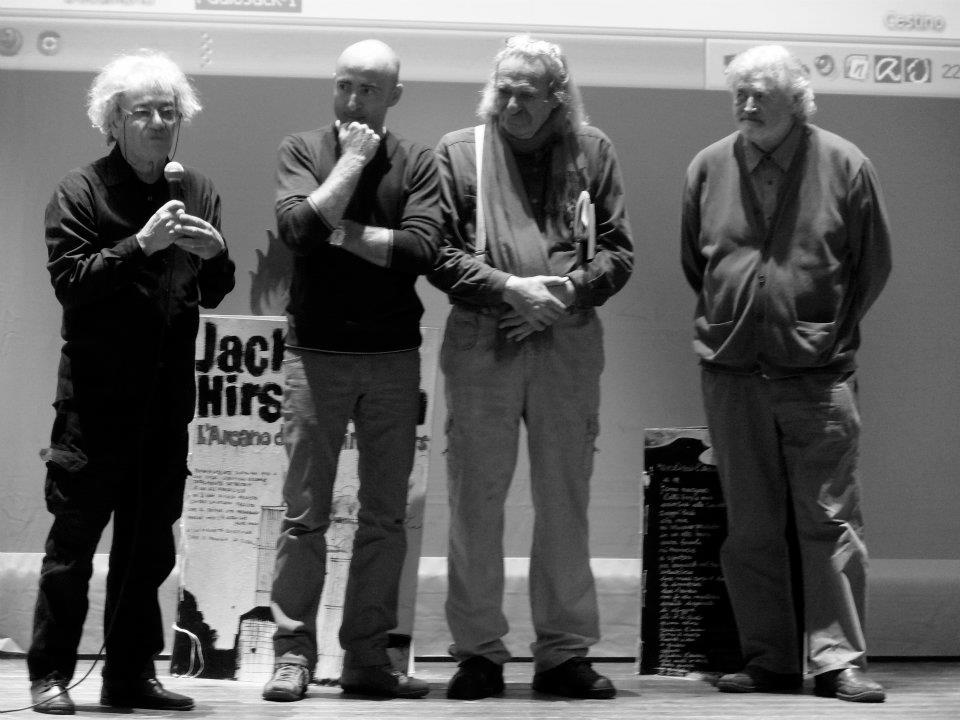
Beppe Costa with Leonardo Omar Onida, Jack Hirschman and Paul Polansky at the Civic Theatre during Ottobre in Poesia

=== Anche ora che la luna ===
From January 2008, begins the tour of poetry and music Anche ora che la luna. Initially, in Salento with the composer Giovanni Renzo at the piano, after alone and performing throughout Italy in places like the Literary Cafe in Rome and the Civic Theatre in Sassari. This tour will continue up to 2011.

=== Ho ancora voglia di sognare ===
In 2009, began a collaboration with the French singer Eva Lopez, creating the show Ho ancora voglia di sognare, interpreting poems in their context and in the encounter with the songs of Leo Ferré, Édith Piaf, Jacques Brel, Georges Brassens.

=== Di me, di altri, ancora ===
In 2009, gets under way the new show di me, di altri, ancora, touring around Italy (taken from the eponymous book forthcoming). In 2012 the tour di me, di altri, ancora will restart with the poet Stefania Battistella.

=== Beppe, il poeta che amava le donne ===
The director Ricky Farina produces the film Beppe, il poeta che amava le donne (Quixote production, 2009).

== Ottobre in Poesia ==
In 2009 he is the guest of honor at Ottobre in Poesia in Sassari, and in 2010 participates in numerous meetings with students from different schools of Sassari. At the end of the Festival Ottobre in Poesia, at the Civic Theatre in Sassari receives the poetics key of the city.

== Events in 2012 ==
On the occasion of 20 years since the birth of the library Pellicanolibri, begin (from February to June) a series of meetings that will see, among the guests, personalities such as Arnoldo Foà, Adele Cambria, Paul Polansky, Jack Hirschman, Viorel Boldis, Alessandra Celletti, Dave Lordan, Andrea Garbin, Fabio Barcellandi, Don Backy and many others.

== Our days ==
In 2012 Costa was invited to the 13th, then was invited to the 14th and 15th, edition of the Nissan Festival which takes place in Maghar, (Israel) founded by the poet Naim Araidi. From 2015 he was president of Terre di Virgilio Prize, from 2016 he was part of Francisco de Aldana Prize jury.

Costa began a collaboration with Era Buçpapaj, of the University of Tirana for several translations from English and Italian. In September 2019 he was invited to the International Poetry Festival in Kosovo, where he met the writer Luan Rama, who, a few days later, wrote an article for two newspapers in Tirana. (Schiptarja.com and Gazeta Schiptare)

== Death ==
Costa died on 10 June 2026, at the age of 84.

== Awards ==
- Ragusa, libro siciliano dell'anno Prize, 1984
- Akesineide Prize 1987
- Alfonso Gatto Prize, 1990
- Città di Ascoli Prize, 1992
- International poetry prize "Il Delfino d'Argento", Nettuno, 1992
- Joppolo Prize, 1997
- Ciac per la poesia Prize (Castel Sant'Angelo, Rome), 2008
- Iceberg News per...parole... Prize, Teranova Festival (Villa Medici, Rome), 2008
- Career Award at "La Befana del Poliziotto 2009" Orione Teatre (Roma)
- Premio Internazionale Città di Ostia: career award, Roma 2012.
- Career Award at Nettuno PhotoFestival, Nettuno 2014
- Career Award at Nisan Festival Maghar (מע'אר, Israel)
- Prize Moniga "Naim Araidi", Moniga del Garda, 2017
- Prize Cultura Ambiente Umanità, Anzio Nettuno, Università Popolare, Fusibilia 8 marzo 2019

== Works ==
=== Guides ===
- Catania, Guida ai monumenti, (with Luccjo Cammarata), Muglia editions
- Sicilia, Guida ai monumenti, (with Luccjo Cammarata), Muglia editions

=== Anthologies ===
- Documento Sicilia, Giuseppe Di Maria editions
- Enotrio, a cura di Dario Micacchi, Jaca Book edizioni, '88
- Almanacco di Galleria, ed. Salvatore Sciascia, year I n. 2, '91
- Poesia '90, edited by Giorgio Weiss and Riccardo Reim, ed. '90
- Poesia '90, edited by Giorgio Weiss and Riccardo Reim, ed. '91
- ContrAppunti perVersi, 1990, Pellicanolibri
- Il Policordo, Rivista, edited by Dante Maffia year VI n 2/3
- ConVersiAmo, 1991, Pellicanolibri
- Ponte degli angeli,1986, Scripta Manent
- L'amore, la guerra, RAI, Radiotelevisione italiana, a cura di Aldo Forbice, 2004. ISBN 88-7841-031-4.
- Calpestare l'oblio edited by Davide Nota and Fabio Orecchini, 2010, Argo
- Acqua privata? no grazie, edited by Marco Cinque, 2011, Ilmiolibro
- Nisan – International Poetry Festival – Maghar, edited by Naim Araidi, 2012
- Heartfire – second revolutionary poets brigade, a cura di Jack Hirschman e Agneta Falk, 2013, Kallatumba Press, S. Francisco. ISBN 9780578127354.
- AA. VV. Manifest'Azioni dal Sottosuolo, a cura di A. Garbin, Seam Edizioni, 2014. ISBN 9788881795185.
- Poems for the Hazara, multilingual poetry anthology, 2014. ISBN 9780983770862.
- Jackissimo, antologia poetica dedicata a Jack Hirschman, a cura di A. Bava, Seam Edizioni, 2014. ISBN 9788881795222.
- AA. VV. SignorNò, poesie e scritti contro la guerra, a cura di M. Cinque e P. Rushton, Seam Edizioni, 2015. ISBN 9788881795314.
- AA. VV. Refugees, 15. Berlin International Literature Festival, 2015, Verlag Vorwerk. ISBN 978-3-940384-78-2.
- AA. VV. Woher ich nicht zurückkehren werde, Berliner Anthologie, Verlag Vorwerk 8. ISBN 978-3-940384-79-9.
- Raimondi Valeria; Costa Beppe; Hirschman Jack: Poetre II. Rrjedhë dallge që shtyn-L'onda dentro che sospinge, Gilgamesh Edizioni, 2016. ISBN 9788868671341.
- No resignación. Antología de Salamanca, a cura di Alfredo Peréz Alencart, Depósito Legal: S. 504-2016 Impreso en Salamanca, en los talleres de Gráficas Lope, 2017
- AA. VV. SignorNò, poesie e scritti contro la guerra, a cura di M. Cinque e P. Rushton, Nuova edizione, Associazione Pellicano, 2016. ISBN 9788899615154.
- AA. VV. LiberAzione poEtica, pref. Jack Hirschman, Pellicano, 2017. ISBN 9788899615277.
- AA. VV. Poeti da morire, a cura di Marco Cinque e Beppe Costa, Pellicano Sardegna, 2018. ISBN 978-88-31918-04-6.
- AA. VV. Giornata mondiale della poesia, Roma 2020
- AA. VV. D'amori, di delitti, di passioni, a cura di Beppe Costa e Vito Davoli, 2022. ISBN 979-8-4203-4791-1
- AA. VV. SignorNò!, a cura di Marco Cinque e Vito Davoli, 2022. ISBN 979-8-3590-5491-1
- AA.VV. Parole a(r)mate, Kondo 2023
- AA.VV. De aquende u allende, XXVI enccuentro del Poetas Iberoamericanos, Edifsa, 2024
- AA.VV. AA.VV. Dissent, an anthology to end war and capitalism, Vagaabon Mark Lipman Editor, 2024, ISBN 9781958307045

=== Prose and poetry ===
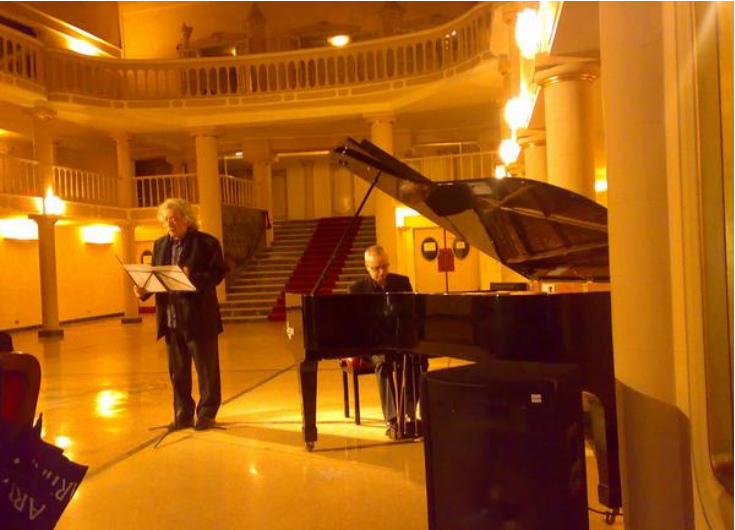
Beppe Costa at Politeama Greco in Lecce

- Una poltrona comoda, Vincenzo di Maria editor, 1970
- Un po' d'amore, Muglia editions, 1975
- Metamorfosi di un concetto astratto in due tempi con accompagnamento di ottavino, (with a foreword by Dario Bellezza), Pellicanolibri, 1982
- Romanzo siciliano, Pellicanolibri, 1984
- Canto d'amore (with illustrations by Ivana Buschini), Pellicanolibri, 1986
- Fatto d'amore (with foreword by Dante Maffia), Pellicanolibri, 1987. ISBN 978-88-85881-01-3.
- Impaginato per affetto (with foreword by Giacinto Spagnoletti), Pellicanolibri, 1989
- Il male felice, Pellicanolibri, 1992
- Due o tre cose che so di lei (with foreword by Luce d'Eramo), Pellicanolibri, 1995. ISBN 978-88-85881-54-9.
- D'amore e d'altro (edited by Luce d'Eramo), Pellicanolibri, 1996. ISBN 9788885881624.
- Poesie per chi non sa fare altro, Pellicanolibri, 2002
- Anche ora che la luna, music CD with the composer Giovanni Renzo, 2009
- Anche ora che la luna (with letter of Adele Cambria), collections of poems, Multimedia editions 2010. ISBN 978-88-86203-55-5.
- Rosso, poesie d'amore e di rivolta edited by Andrea Garbin, with foreword by Mauro Macario, VoloPress Edizioni, 2012
- La terra (non è) il cielo!, Gilgamesh Edizioni 2014. ISBN 9788868670078.
- Dell'amore e d'altre abitudini, con Stefania Battistella, Pellicanolibri Edizioni 2014. ISBN 9788885881808.
- L'ultima nuvola, Pellicano 2015. ISBN 9788894117554.
- Rosso, poesie d'amore e di rivolta, in appendice "Lettera d'amore non spedita", Pellicano Associazione Culturale, 2016. ISBN 9788899615116.
- Per chi fa turni di notte, Pellicano Associazione Culturale, 2017. ISBN 9788899615406.
- Romanzo siciliano – La trilogia, Pellicano Associazione Culturale, 2017. ISBN 9788899615376.
- Il poeta che amava le donne (e parlava coi muri), Pellicano Sardegna, 2018. ISBN 9788831918053.
- Il poeta che amava le donne (e parlava coi muri), Pettirosso editore, 2019. ISBN 9788898965243.
- Nicola Alesini, Beppe Costa, Metà del tempo, poesia a due voci, Alfa Music EAN. 8032050021188.
- Dall'altra parte dell'orizzonte, a cura di Vito Davoli, Pellicano Cult / Amazon KDP 2022. ISBN 979-8-3700-1992-0
- La via semplice, plaquette da una poesia, con una foto di Dino Ignani e un aforisma critico di Ugo Magnanti, FusibiliaLibri, Anzio, 2023. ISBN 978-88-98649-93-8
- Delitto imperfetto, 50 poesie sulla poesia e sui poeti, a cura di Ugo Magnanti, Di Carlo editore, 2024, ISBN 979-12-81566-73-6

Beppe Costa, D'amore e d'altri bisogni, poesie e musica (con Matteo Cavicchini) e una nota di Mauro Macario, Pellicanolibri, 2024, ISBN 978-88-85881-81-5* Oratorio in bianco e nero per Gaza, melologo, con Ugo Magnanti, musica di Nicola Alesini, FusibiliaLibri, Anzio, 2025, ISBN 979-12-82091-04-6

== Bibliography ==
- 1989 Salvatore Scalia, Il vulcano e la sua anima, Prova d'autore – (pag. 130).
- 1995 it:Vittoriano Esposito, L'altro Novecento nella poesia italiana – Critica e testi Volume I – Bastogi – (pagg. 162–165).
- 2002 Luca Clerici, Apparizione e visione Vita e opere di it:Anna Maria Ortese – Mondadori – (pagg. 530, 540, 561).
- 2003 it:Vittoriano Esposito, L'altro Novecento – La poesia "impura" – Bastogi – (pag. 148).
- 2004 it:Aldo Forbice (a cura di), L'amore e la guerra, RAI Eri, Ibiskos – (pag. 274).
- 2006 it:Vittoriano Esposito, L'altro Novecento – La poesia "onesta" – Bastogi – (pagg. 166–168).
- 2006 Maurizio Gregorini, Il male di Dario Bellezza – Stampa alternativa – (pag. 158).
- 2006 L'arcano fascino dell'amore tradito, tributo a Dario Bellezza – a cura di Fabrizio Cavallaro, – Giulio Perrone – (pag. 93).
- 2008 Adelia Battista, Ortese segreta, Minimum fax – (pag. 61).
- 2009 Arnoldo Foà, Autobiografia di un artista burbero, Sellerio – (pag. 134).
- 2011 it:Anna Maria Ortese Bellezza addio, Rosellina Archinto – (pag. 112).
- 2015 Dario Bellezza, Tutte le poesie, Mondadori – (pag. XVII, XXXII, XXXIII).

== Related items ==
- Pellicanolibri
- it:Legge Bacchelli
- it:Anna Maria Ortese
- it:Goliarda Sapienza
