= Andrea Garbin =

Italian poet (born 1976)

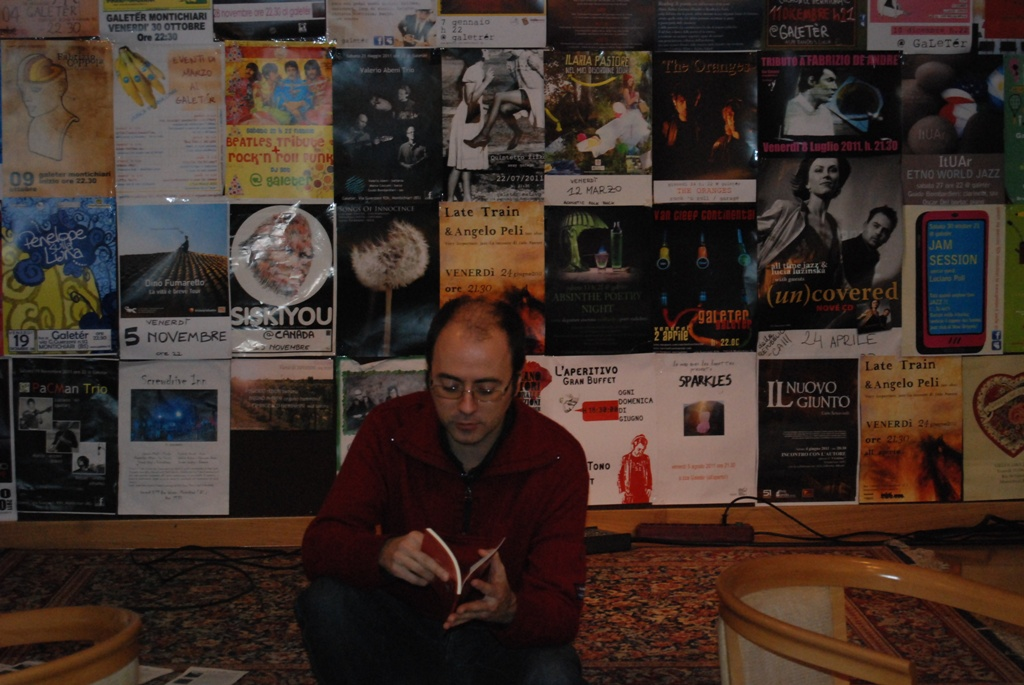
- Andrea Garbin al Caffè Galéter.jpg
- Born: March 22, 1976; Castel Goffredo, Mantua, Italy
- Occupations: Poet, writer
- Writing career
- Period: 2000

Andrea Garbin (born March 22, 1976) is an Italian poet. He was born in Castel Goffredo, Brescia, Italy.

== Career ==
Garbin began writing short stories and poems at the beginning of the 1990s. Between 2007 and 2008, he participated in the reading and writing meetings of Mantua, whose editors included David Bregola, Sergio Rotino, Giorgio Vast] and Giulio Milani. At the end of the cycle, in 2008, an anthology of short stories For Christmas do not go out, contained his story "A Christmas Package".

Garbin became a friend of Beppe Costa, traveling to Rome on several occasions, for lectures and presentations. He participated at the 2008 Terranova Festival at the French Cultural Institute in Rome. In 2008 he started working at the Coffee Galeter Montichiari, where in a few months he created a lively environment for artistic exchanges that led to the birth of the Movement of the Underdark.

With the creation of poetry dating from the Underdark and Literary Contrasts, the attracted international authors including Elisa Biagini, Aleksandra Gennadievna Petrova, Jack Hirschman, Paul Polansky, Alberto Mori, Dave Lordan, Ferruccio Brugnaro, Antonieta Villamil, Mark Lipman, Agneta Falk, Sandro Sardella, Gianluca Paciucci, Neeli Cherkovski, Naim Araidi, Milo De Angelis, Nenad Glišić, Ivana Maksić, Sarah Menefee and Beppe Costa.

In 2009, he participated in Sconfinatementi, a cultural partnership between the Literary Cafe First Floor Brescia and Studentski Kulturni center of Kragujevac in Serbia, In 2010 he started working with Thauma Editions, Xerxes Cardellini. With Fabio Barcellandi as a curator, for the Lombardy region, created the traveling poetic necklace, an experience that closed in 2014. In 2011, along with other members of the movement from underground he started a campaign in favor of the Colombian poet Angye Gaona that resulted in his first film Birth volatil. In the same year, he went to Ireland, with Luca Artioli and Fabio Barcellandi for a tour of presentations that touched the island's main city, meeting many Irish poets. He went to Sarajevo and encountered the Revolutionary Poets Brigade and 100 Thousand Poets for Change. In 2013 he became a member of the Collage de 'Pataphysique. From 2014, he directs to Gilgamesh Editions, the contemporary poetry series Mosquitoes. He participated in the festival The poem resistant (Salerno), Palabra en el mundo (Castellammare), Ottobre in Poesia (Sassari) and the International Festival Nopţile de Poezie de la Curtea de Arges (Romania).

== Publications ==
=== Poetry ===
- Il senso della musa, Aletti Editore 2007 ISBN 9788876801938
- Lattice, Fara Editore 2009 ISBN 9788895139609
- Boder Songs, edizione bilingue – C.C.Marimbo Berkley 2011 ISBN 1-930903-65-0
- Viaggio di un guerriero senz'arme, Edizioni L'Arca Felice 2012 ISBN 9788897723011 Premio Biennale di Como "under 35" – sezione hailu del 2009.
- Croce del sud, Gilgamesh Edizioni 2013 ISBN 9788897469223
- Genesi dei sensi, Gilgamesh Edizioni 2015 ISBN 9788868670740
- Canti di confine, Pellicano Associazione Culturale 2016 ISBN 9788899615093

=== Anthologies ===
- Fleurs du mal, Nicola Pesce Editore 2007
- Salvezza e impegno, AA.VV. Fara Editore 2010, ISBN 9788895139852
- Il valore del tempo nella scrittura, AA.VV. Fara Editore 2011, ISBN 9788897441021
- Poethree – new italian voices, edizione bilingue Italia/irlanda – AA.VV. Thauma Edizioni 2011, ISBN 9788897204077
- Labyrinthi, Antologia Poetica vol.3, AA.VV. Limina Mentis 2013, ISBN 9788898496075
- Poetre – una vibrazione ondeggiante delle ali, edizione bilingue Italia/Albania – AA.VV. Thauma Edizioni 2013
- 100mila poeti per il cambiamento – Bologna: Primo Momento, Qudulibri 2013
- Heartfire: Second Revolutionary Poets Brigade Anthology – Kallatumba Press, 2013, ISBN 9780578127354
- 100 Thousand Poets For Change – Albeggi Edizioni 2013
- Poems for the Hazara, multilingual poetry anthology, 2014, ISBN 9780983770862
- Manifest'Azioni dal Sottosuolo, AA. VV. a cura di Andrea Garbin, Seam Edizioni 2014, ISBN 978-8-8817951-8-5
- Sotto il cielo di Lampedusa II. Nessun uomo è un'isola, AA.VV. Rayuela Edizioni 2014 ISBN 9788897325178
- SignorNò. Poesie e scritti contro la guerra, AA.VV. Seam Edizioni 2014, ISBN 9788881795352
- I dialetti nelli valli del mondo, AA.VV. Seam Edizioni 2015, ISBN 9788881795314

=== Narrativa ===
- Per natale non-esco: un pacco di natale, AA.VV. TranseuropaLibri 2008, ISBN 9788875800253
- Il rumore degli occhi: Metri 27, AA.VV. Edizioni Creativa 2009, ISBN 9788889841761 Prize Of Jury City Of Salò 2010.

== Prizes ==
- Grand Prize International Orient-Occident for Arts, Curtea de Argeș, Romania, 2015
