= Fabio Barcellandi =

Italian poet and translator

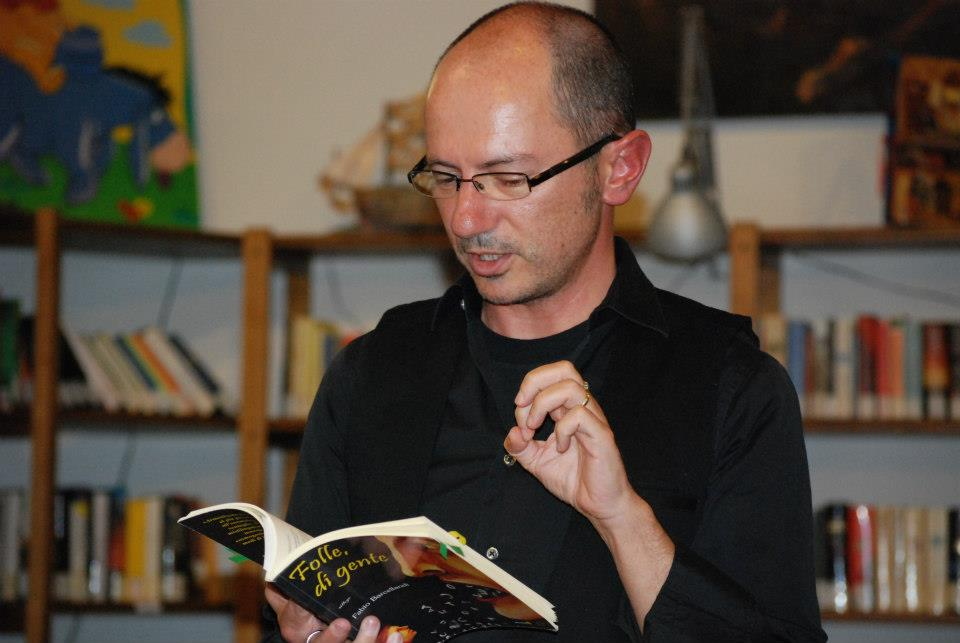
- Barcellandi during a reading
- Born: March 22, 1968; Brescia, Italy
- Occupations: Poet; translator

Fabio Barcellandi (born March 22, 1968) is an Italian poet and translator.

== Life and career ==
Since 2009 he has been working with Beppe Costa with whom he organizes, in Rome, the meetings "Poeti dallo Spazio" at the bookshop Pellicanolibri.
Conducts workshops of composition and poetical writing for the Cooperative Zeroventi with secondary school students of first and second degree, the most recents at the high school Caccioppoli of Scafati and at the teaching institute Margherita di Castelvì of Sassari.
He is a member of the groups POESIAinCIVILE, Poeti dal Sottosuolo and of the Revolutionary Poets Brigade founded by Jack Hirschman.
Guest in 2010 and 2012 at the International Festival Ottobre in Poesia, with interventions in schools, bookshops and readings organized within the festival.
With Luca Artioli and Andrea Garbin is the curator for the region Lombardy, of the "collana poetica itinerante" of Thauma Editions.
He participated to several readings and poetry venues in Italy. And Ireland: as a matter of fact, last May 2011 he has been published in the new Italian/English poetry anthology for Thauma Editions "POETHREE new italian voices" with Luca Artioli, and it:Andrea Garbin. This book, which is part of a project in collaboration with the Irish poet, Dave Lordan, author of the translations, has brought the three Italian poets on an Irish poetry tour:
– starting from last June 18, with the Dublin date, at "The Irish Centre for Poetry Studies Mater Dei Institute of Education (DCU)", they also performed in Trim, Greystones, Cork, Galway and Derry.
Since 2012 he has been part of the jury of the Premio Centro per la Nuova Poesia d'Autore, held in Chia Soriano nel Cimino in the places of Pier Paolo Pasolini.

== Publications ==
=== Anthologies ===
- Il mercante d'inchiostro, Farnedi Edizioni, 2006. ISBN 9788888827735.
- Tutti i colori dei bambini, Montag Edizioni, 2008. ISBN 9788895478227.
- Quinto colore, La scrittura creativa di opposto ed., 2009.
- 365 piccoli giorni, La scrittura creativa di opposto ed., 2009.
- Poethree, new Italian voices, Thauma Edizioni, 2011. ISBN 9788897204282.
- Acqua privata? No grazie!, edited by di Marco Cinque, IlMioLibro edizioni, 2011.
- AA. VV. SignorNò, poesie e scritti contro la guerra, a cura di M. Cinque e P. Rushton, Pellicano Edizioni, 2015. ISBN 9788899615154.
- AA. VV. LiberAzione poEtica. pref. Jack Hirschman, Pellicano, 2016. ISBN 9788899615277.

His short stories have appeared in Writers Magazine Italia and it:MacWorld.

=== Poetry ===
- Parole alate, Cicorivolta, 2007. ISBN 9788895106298.
- Nero, l'inchiostro, Montag Edizioni, 2008. ISBN 9788895478364.
- Folle, di gente, Montag Edizioni, 2011. ISBN 9788896793626.

=== Translations ===
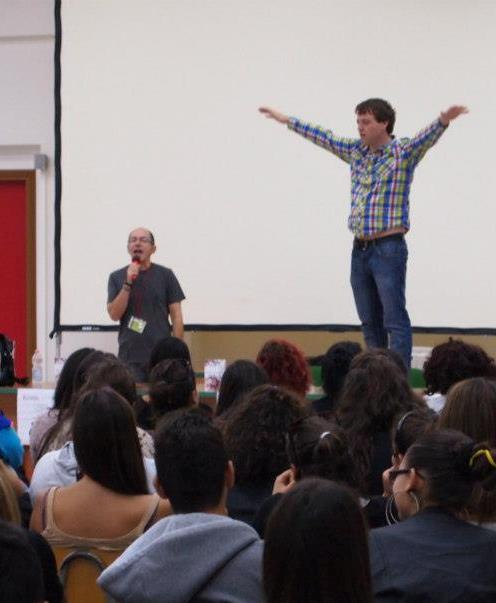
Fabio Barcellandi and Dave Lordan at the teaching institute Margherita di Castelvì (Sassari)

- Dave Lordan Sopravvivere alla crisi, Thauma Edizioni, 2012. ISBN 9788897204282.
- Connor Kelly Lost poems, self produced.

Fabio Barcellandi has also translated texts by: Kevin Higgins (poet) (Ireland), Diane di Prima (USA), Carl Rakosi and Richard Tillinghast (USA) (one of the translated texts from Richard Tillinghast is published in the journal Le Voci della Luna No. 48), Portuguese poems by Mário Quintana (Brazil), Spanish poems by Violeta Camerati (Chile).

== Prizes ==
- Premio Solaris, 2008
- Prix Teranova per la Poesia, 2009
