= Premio Internazionale Città di Ostia =

The Premio Internazionale Città di Ostia was founded in 1971 by Tonino Colloca.

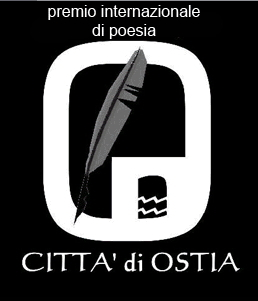
logo Premio Internazionale Città di Ostia

== Story ==
Premio Internazionale Città di Ostia is organized by cultural association Anco Marzio, of whom Tonino Colloca is the president, with the purpose of enhance and promote personalities that come from different areas like literature, music, painting, theater, cinema, television etc. The prize increases and moves to the great hall of Palace Hotel Satellite, then move to the new Theater Manfredi The edition of 2012 takes place inside the cinema complex at Ostia Cineland.

The first edition in 1971, has awarded Vittorio Gassman; in subsequent edition were awarded personalities such as: Ubaldo Lay, Paola Borboni, Maurizio Arena, Stella Carnacina, Ugo Pagliai, Antonella Lualdi, Arnoldo Foà, Beppe Costa, Stefania Battistella, Giovanna Mulas, Franco Loi. In 2003, the actor Arnoldo Foà, called from Mr. Colloca to read the winning poems, he also recited verses of Licio Gelli, the author of many volumes of poetry. Talked about it more than 72 national newspapers.

Prize provided, and still provides, different moments in addition of the Poetry Prize (two section: published and unpublished): other section which will be announced year by year, and the category Ostia nel Mondo (Ostia in the World). This last section include the characters in the world of business, art and journalism. The Premio internazionale Città di Ostia, in addition to Institutional medals, donates to the winners artwork.

== Outstanding participations ==
In last two editions, have framed as friend Gigi D'Alessio, Tosca D’Aquino, Enrica Bonaccorti, Enrico Montesano, Alessandra Mussolini, Fabio Rampelli, Marco Marsilio, Fausto Bertinotti, Davide Rondoni, Rita Charbonnier, Luciano Regolo, Massimo Buscema, Angelo Mellone, Pietra Montecorvino, Massimiliano Gallo, Luca Ward, Giada Desideri, Edy Angelillo, Christian Floris, Direttivo Rai Internazionale.
