= Eva López =

Eva López may refer to:

- Eva López (synchronized swimmer)
- Eva Lopez (singer)
