= Dario Bellezza =

Italian poet

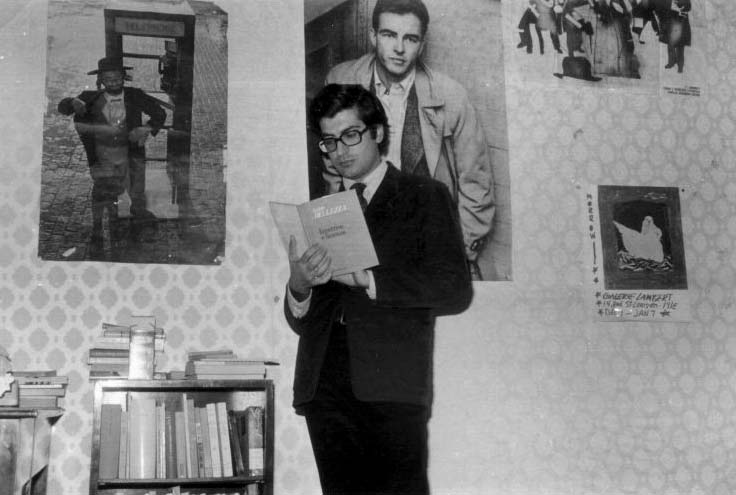
- Dario Bellezza in 1971, reading from his Invettive e licenze
- Born: 5 September 1944; Rome, Kingdom of Italy
- Died: 31 March 1996 (aged 51); Rome, Italy
- Occupations: Author; poet; playwright
- Writing career
- Notable works: Invettive e licenze, L'avversario, Morte segreta, Ordalia della croce
- Notable awards: Viareggio, Gatto Prize, Montale Prize, Fondi la Postora

Dario Bellezza (5 September 1944 – 31 March 1996) was an Italian poet, author and playwright. He won the Viareggio, Gatto, and Montale prizes.

== Biography ==
Dario Bellezza was born in Rome on 5 September 1944. After his studies at a liceo classico in his native city, from which he graduated in 1962, he worked for several Italian literary and poetry magazines: Paragone, Carte segrete, Bimestre, Periferia, and Il Policordo.

Bellezza entered the Roman intellectual world in the mid-1960s when, thanks to literary critic and writer Enzo Siciliano, he became increasingly close to Sandro Penna, Aldo Palazzeschi, Attilio Bertolucci, Alberto Moravia, and Elsa Morante, who eventually became a confidant.

The decade from 1950–1960 was a period in which the working class, the Italian Communist Party, the trade unions, and all their hopes for radical cultural change were dramatically defeated. The political and economic growth of the Christian Democrat middle class and the new, changed Freemasonries prevailed.

Bellezza, thus, lived in a political-cultural era convulsed by the ideological confrontations of the 1960s and the subversive ideological line of the aggressive neoavant-garde that struggled against conventional linguistic codes.

From the early 1960s on, Bellezza collaborated with the magazine Nuovi argomenti, becoming associate director shortly before his death.

When Invettive e licenze (Invectives and Licenses) appeared in 1971, it was hailed by Pier Paolo Pasolini in his introduction: "Here is the best poet of the new generation". Invettive e licenze, notable for its technical rigour, depicts people overwhelmed by bitterness, shame, feelings of guilt, alienation, scandal, and sexual perversions. The poems also express a constant, thinly veiled desire for death.

Since 1978 has begun a collaboration with Pellicanolibri, with the series "Inediti rari e diversi", publishing texts by Alberto Moravia, Renzo Paris, Gianfranco Rossi, Goliarda Sapienza and Anna Maria Ortese, for her with Beppe Costa and Adele Cambria, he will manage to enforce for the first time the Bacchelli’s law, an annuity which is intended to poets and writers in need.

Bellezza was a bourgeois, as were many other intellectuals, but differed from them, according to Pasolini, in being "the first poet bourgeois to judge himself".
Pasolini had a profound affection for Bellezza's work and his artistic experience. The young poet reciprocated this feeling and also was deeply grateful to Elsa Morante for what he called his poetic apprenticeship.

In 1981, enraged by the publication of the "obscene" photographs of the dead Pasolini "in tutta la loro gelida, disarmante crudezza... nudo, esposto, con tutte le macabre ferite esibite del suo 'sacro' martirio" (in their icy, disarming rawness... naked, exposed, with all the grisly wounds exhibited of his 'sacred' martyrdom), Bellezza wrote the biographical essay Morte di Pasolini (Death of Pasolini).

In 1983, he published io (me), the lack of capital letters intentional. In this work, Bellezza lightly but concretely describes his everyday life and the mediocre desperation of his loves in ample detail. The poet associates life with insomnia, a curse that constantly pursues him:

mi imprigioni, o insonnia

Translation:

you imprison me, o insomnia

In the book, he describes suffering from insomnia because, as a highly educated bourgeois and homosexual bigot, he feels tortured by a feeling of guilt and driven by the many contradictions that struggle against each other. Such contradictions are the quintessence of his existence:

l'insonnia viene solo ai bugiardi,
a chi disobbedisce

Translation:

insomnia comes only to liars,
to those who disobey

In his guilt-ridden insomniac persona, he anticipated the poetry that would be too often adopted in the 1980s, that of the artist-outcast.

Bellezza was consumed by anguish and by the relics of (a now mocking) sense of hope:

E se l'orecchio poso al rumore solo
delle scale battute dal rimorso
sento la tua discesa corrosa
dalla speranza

Translation:

And if the ear I place to the noise only
of staircases beaten by remorse
I hear your descent corroded
by hope

He is reduced to corrosive accounts of his own social condition:

Io
dimenticato relitto di una civiltà
passata sono il solo che piango i defunti
miraggi di un'età morta.

Translation:

I
forgotten wreckage of a civilization
from the past I am the only one crying the dead
mirages of an age gone.

The difficulty of homosexual life in Rome, particularly the requirements of secrecy and clandestinity of the love act, is a staple of Bellezza's poetic and prosaic writing. In Bellezza's first novel, L'innocenza ("Innocence", 1971), Nino, the protagonist, consciously chooses the perdition and corruption of a living homosexual hell. In Bellezza's infernal world, homosexuality can be nothing else but prostitution and neurotically masochistic obsessions: in Lettere da Sodoma ("Letters from Sodom", 1972), his conclusion is that everything is Hell and that the only salvation is the systematic refusal of the self.

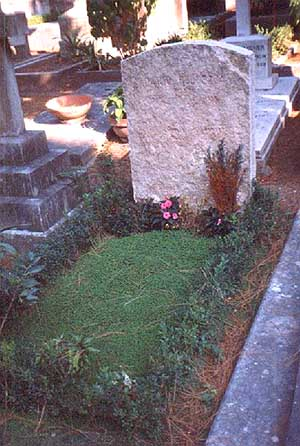
The tomb of Dario Bellezza in the non-Catholic cemetery in Rome

Bellezza won the Viareggio Prize in 1976 for Morte segreta, the Gatto Prize in 1991 for Invettive e licenze, the Montale Prize in 1994 for L'avversario, and for the play Ordalia della croce he received the Fondi la Postora Prize in 1994.

He died of AIDS in Rome on 31 March 1996. That year, a poetry prize was established in his name.

== Works ==
=== Poetry ===
- Invettive e licenze ("Invectives and licenses", 1971)
- Morte segreta ("Secret death", 1976)
- Libro d'amore ("Book of love", 1982)
- io (me) ("I (me)", 1983)
- Piccolo canzoniere (small collection of lyrics, 1986)
- Undici erotiche ("Eleven erotic pieces", 1986)
- Serpenta (Lo specchio) (1987). ISBN 88-04-30065-5.
- Libro di poesia ("Book of poetry", 1990). ISBN 88-11-63022-3.
- Testamento di sangue ("Testament of blood", 1992). ISBN 88-11-64006-7.
- Gatti e altro ("Cats etc.", 1993)
- L'avversario ("The adversary", 1994). ISBN 88-04-37942-1.
- Proclama sul fascino ("Manifest of glamour", 1996). ISBN 88-04-41751-X.

The collected works were published as:

- Poesie 1971–1996 (2002)

His poems have appeared in English translations:

- by Ruth Feldman and Brian Swann in Italian Poetry Today: Currents and Trends
- by Luca Baldoni in Italian Poetry Review, vol. 1, 2006, pp. 76–91
- by Peter Covino in Asymptote

=== Prose ===
- L'innocenza ("Innocence", 1970). ISBN 88-85881-79-3, Pellicanolibri, 1992
- Lettere da Sodoma ("Letters from Sodom", 1972)
- Il carnefice ("The executioner", 1973)
- Angelo ("Angel", 1979)
- Morte di Pasolini ("Pasolini's death", 1981, also published as Il poeta assassinato: Una riflessione, un'ipotesi, una sfida sulla morte di Pier Paolo Pasolini (Gli specchi della memoria), 1996). ISBN 88-317-6386-5.
- Storia di Nino De Donato ("The History of Nino", a new edition of L'innocenza), 1983
- Turbamento ("Disturbance", 1984)
- L'amore felice: Romanzo ("Happy love: a novel", 1986). ISBN 88-18-06023-6.
- L'innocenza e altri racconti, Pellicanolibri, 1992. ISBN 978-88-858-8179-2.
- Nozze col diavolo: Romanzi e racconti ("Marriage with the devil", 1995). ISBN 88-317-6064-5.

=== Theatre ===
- Testamento di sangue ("Testament of blood", 1992)
- Apologia di teatro - Colosseo ("Apology of theatre", 1983, Pellicanolibri, 1985)
- Salomé (1991, Arduino Sacco, 2009)
- Morte funesta ("Woeful death", 1993)
- Ordalia della croce ("Ordeal of the cross", 1994)

== Bibliography ==
=== English ===
- Renzo Paris in Bloody Europe! Racconti, Playground, Rome, 2004.
- Canadian Journal of Italian Studies, vol. 20, 1997. DeSoto Press.
- Golino, C. L. (1990). "Dario Bellezza". Italian Quarterly. 31. Dante Alighieri Society of Los Angeles.
- Moliterno, G. (2000). Encyclopedia of Contemporary Italian Culture. CRC Press. ISBN 978-0-415-14584-8.
- PEN International. 32. International PEN, UNESCO: 101–147. 1982.

=== Italian ===
- Battisti, S. and M. Bettarini. Chi è il poeta?. Milan: Gammalibri, 1980.
- Cavallaro, F. (ed.). L'arcano fascino dell'amore tradito, Giulio Perrone Editore, Roma 2006.
- Cordelli, F. Il poeta postumo. Consenza: Lerici, 1978.
- Cristallo, M. Uscir fuori Dieci anni di lotte omosessuali in Italia: 1971/1981, Teti, Milano 1996, pp. 36–38.
- Cucchi, M. and S. Giovanardi. Poeti italiani del secondo novecento 1945-1995. Milan: Mondadori, 1996.
- Esposito, V. L'altro Novecento nella poesia italiana: critica e testi. Bastogi, 1999.
- Gnerre, F. L'eroe negato. Omosessualità e letteratura nel Novecento italiano, Baldini & Castoldi, Milano 2000.
- Gregorini, M. Il male di Dario Bellezza: vita e morte di un poeta. Stampa alternativa/ Nuovi equilibri, 2006. ISBN 88-7226-915-6, ISBN 978-88-7226-915-2, 208 pages.
- Gregorini, M. Morte di Bellezza: storia di una verità nascosta. Castelvecchi, 1997. ISBN 88-8210-002-2, ISBN 978-88-8210-002-5, 143 pages.
- Priori, D. Diario di un mostro. Omaggio insolito a Dario Bellezza, 2006.
