= Pellicanolibri =

Italian publishing house

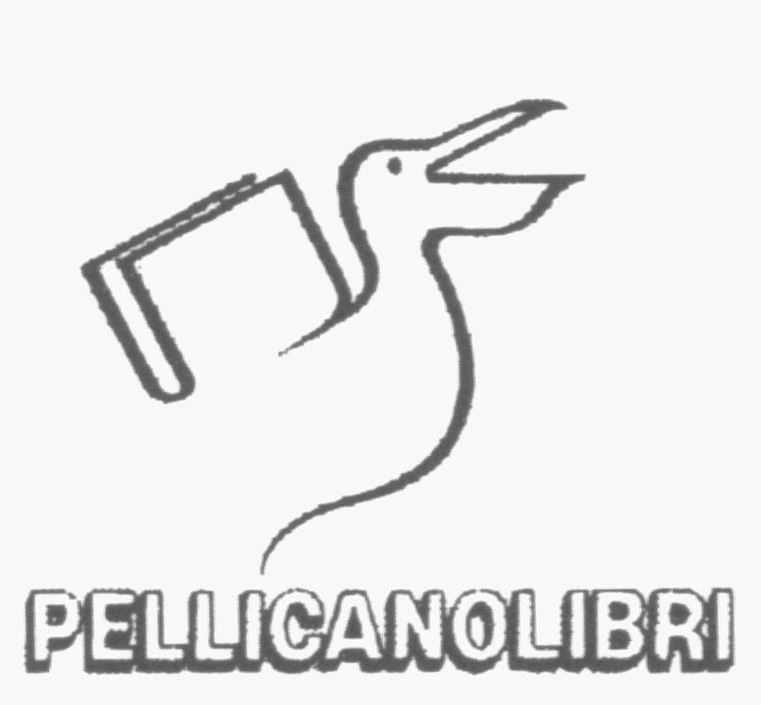
- Industry: Books, publishing
- Founded: 1976
- Founder: Beppe Costa
- Headquarters: Rome, Italy
- Products: Books

The Pellicanolibri editions is a publishing house founded in 1976 in Catania by the poet and writer Beppe Costa, with the specific intent to highlight authors and discover forgotten or unknown youth.

== Story ==
Pellicanolibri editions was created with the help of some academics: Gastone Manacorda, Giuseppe Barone, Antonino Recupero, Salvatore Lupo. It isn't born with the only purpose of publishing, but with the strong and specific intent to introduce in Italy (up to 85 in Sicily), Italian and foreign authors.

From 1978 to 1996, the contribution of Dario Bellezza, gives life to the series Inediti rari e diversi, with authors like Angelo Maria Ripellino, Anna Maria Ortese, Alberto Moravia. Public, among others, books by Fernando Arrabal, Arnoldo Foà, Ruggero Orlando, Melo Freni, Luce d'Eramo, Federico de Roberto, Antonio Uccello, Stefano Bottari, Leopold Sedar Senghor, Léo Ferré, Goliarda Sapienza, Gregory Corso, Adele Cambria, Giacinto Spagnoletti, Mario Vargas Llosa.

Pellicanolibri was the first publishing house in Italy to publish Manuel Vázquez Montalbán (author later become famous as a writer of thrillers). In 1992, continued the business with a great cultural center and bookstore (directed by his son Dante) in a suburb of Rome. In 2008, Pellicanolibri public another work by Fernando Arrabal La scampagnata.

== Publications ==
=== Series: Inediti rari e diversi ===
- 1982 Lettere libertine, it:Riccardo Reim
- 1983 Il trionfo dello sciamano, Gianfranco Rossi
- 1983 Il treno russo, it:Anna Maria Ortese
- 1984 Forza Etna!, pref. Alberto Bevilacqua, Enzo Grasso
- 1984 it:Romanzo Siciliano, Beppe Costa
- 1984 La tempesta, Alberto Moravia
- 1984 Fuori rotta, it:Renzo Paris
- 1985 Gente d'Europa, Jeph Anelli
- 1985 Colosseo Apologia di teatro, Dario Bellezza
- 1985 Vivere con i diavoli Mario Marconato
- 1985 L'immagine la memoria il tempo, Egidio Cacciola
- 1985 Doppio deserto, it:Tommaso Di Francesco
- 1985 I triambuli, it:Elio Pecora
- 1986 Nudo di donna con rovine, it:Adele Cambria
- 1986 La gondola di Tiziano, it:Riccardo Reim
- 1986 I sogni ricorrenti di Biagio Balestrieri pref. di Roberto Pazzi, Gianfranco Rossi

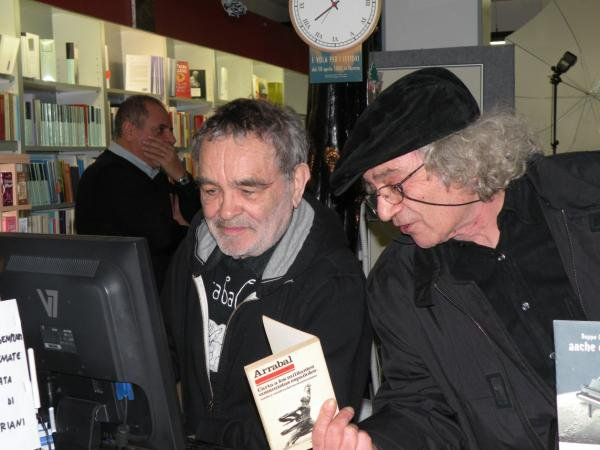
Fernando Arrabal with Beppe Costa at Pellicanolibri

- 1987 Fatto d'amore, Beppe Costa
- 1987 La stagione della violenza, Enzo Grasso
- 1987 Le vergini folli, Grazia Lago
- 1987 Estivi terrori, it:Anna Maria Ortese
- 1987 Scontraffatte chimere, it:Angelo Maria Ripellino
- 1987 Le certezze del dubbio, it:Goliarda Sapienza
- 1989 Impaginato per affetto, Beppe Costa
- 1990 Le pompe di satana, Arnoldo Foà
- 1990 Contrappunti PerVersi - Antologia poetica, Autori Vari
- 1990 Contrazione, Patrizia Lettieri
- 1990 Il grido della chimera, Gabriella Zappalà
- 1990 Non fotografate gli oleandri, Enzo Grasso, pref. Dacia Maraini
- 1991 Le gemelle, Egidio Cacciola
- 1991 Canti e poesie, Claudio Cundari
- 1991 La formica, Arnoldo Foà
- 1991 Esodo allo specchio, Vittorio Napoli La Rocca
- 1991 Le tartarughe, Massimo Muratori
- 1991 Poesie vecchie e nuove, it:Ruggero Orlando
- 1991 ConVersiAmo - Antologia poetica, Autori Vari
- 1991 Geografia del cuore, Fiammetta Selva
- 1992 L'inutile errante, Adriano Angelini
- 1992 Le calde stagioni, it:Melo Freni
- 1992 Vapori, Luigi Galamini di Recanati
- 1992 Marocco (viaggio con io), Domenico Tolomei
- 1992 Amore sbendato, it:Federico Verdinois
- 1992 Che ne sai povero poeta? (logoritmi), Franco Zagato
- 1994 Sotto il trono del pavone, Rocco Giudice
- 1994 Fuga possibile, Antonello Stefanini
- 1994 Mafia una favola vera, Filippo Feo
- 1984 Disabitati cieli (poesie 1965-1994), Fiammetta Selva
- 1995 Due o forse più cose che so di lei, Beppe Costa
- 1995 Poesia visiva multimediale, De Ioanna, Scarpa
- 1996 Penisole (poesie), Imma Libertino
- 1996 Cerchi concentrici, Antonello Stefanini
- 1996 Racconti neri e grotteschi, Mario Ricotta
- 1997 Ombre nell'eden, Ignazio Cassaniti
- 1997 Raskolnikov e il marxismo, Luce d'Eramo
- 1997 Er cazzabuglio (poesie), Giovanni Plini
- 1998 La gabbia e il corvo, Antonella Lupidi
- 2002 Poesie per chi non sa fare altro, illustration by Daniela Riccioli, Beppe Costa
- 2002 Poesie per chi non sa fare altro, illustration by Daniela Riccioli, Beppe Costa
- 2008 La scampagnata, Fernando Arrabal

=== Series: La nave dei folli ===
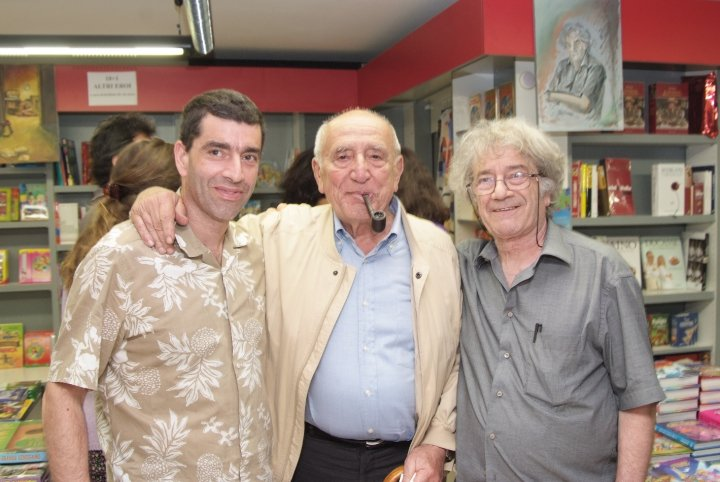
Arnoldo Foà, Beppe Costa and Dante Costa at Pellicanolibri

- 1978 Panico, Fernando Arrabal, Alejandro Jodorowsky, Roland Topor
- 1978 1977: Autonomia/Organizzazione, Nino Recupero
- 1979 Dieci anni in piazza, it:Franco Trincale
- 1979 Al magnifico rettore, Ninello Nerpa
- 1980 Manifesto subnormale, Manuel Vázquez Montalbán
- 1981 Dalla luna calanco lucana il mare, Mario Marconato
- 1982 Il gran cerimoniale, (translation by Beppe Costa), Fernando Arrabal
- 1982 Metamorfosi di un concetto astratto con accompagnamento di ottavino, preface of Dario Bellezza, Beppe Costa
- 1984 Bello l'amore mio che se ne andò in marina with an interview of Salvatore Samperi, it:Riccardo Reim

=== Series: I Tascabili ===
- 1992 L'innocenza e altri racconti afterword by Alberto Moravia, Dario Bellezza
- 1992 Il male felice, Beppe Costa
- 1992 La costituzione di Prinz, Arnoldo Foà
- 1992 Storia di Rico, Luigi Reina
- 1993 Un amore a Spoleto, it:Melo Freni

=== Series: Visioni e immaginazioni ===
- 1980 La casa di Icaro pref. di Carlo Muscetta, it:Antonino Uccello
- 1981 Poesie poesie erotiche lu veru piaceri favuli, Domenico Tempio
- 1984 Monumenti svevi di Sicilia, it:Stefano Bottari
- 1984 Arte a Catania 1921 1950, Giuseppe Frazzetto
- 1985 Pittore tra la Sicilia e l'Europa, Jano Barbagallo
- 1985 Catania, with 152 illustrations, Federico de Roberto
- 1988 I due imperi di Roma, Luigi Pareti
- 1988 Teatro, Mario Ricotta
- 1989 Si conta e si racconta, Luigi Capuana
- 1990 Un'ombra sull'Europa: La tragedia dell'Irlanda del nord, Enzo Farinella

=== Series: Prima Impaginazione (poems and prose) ===
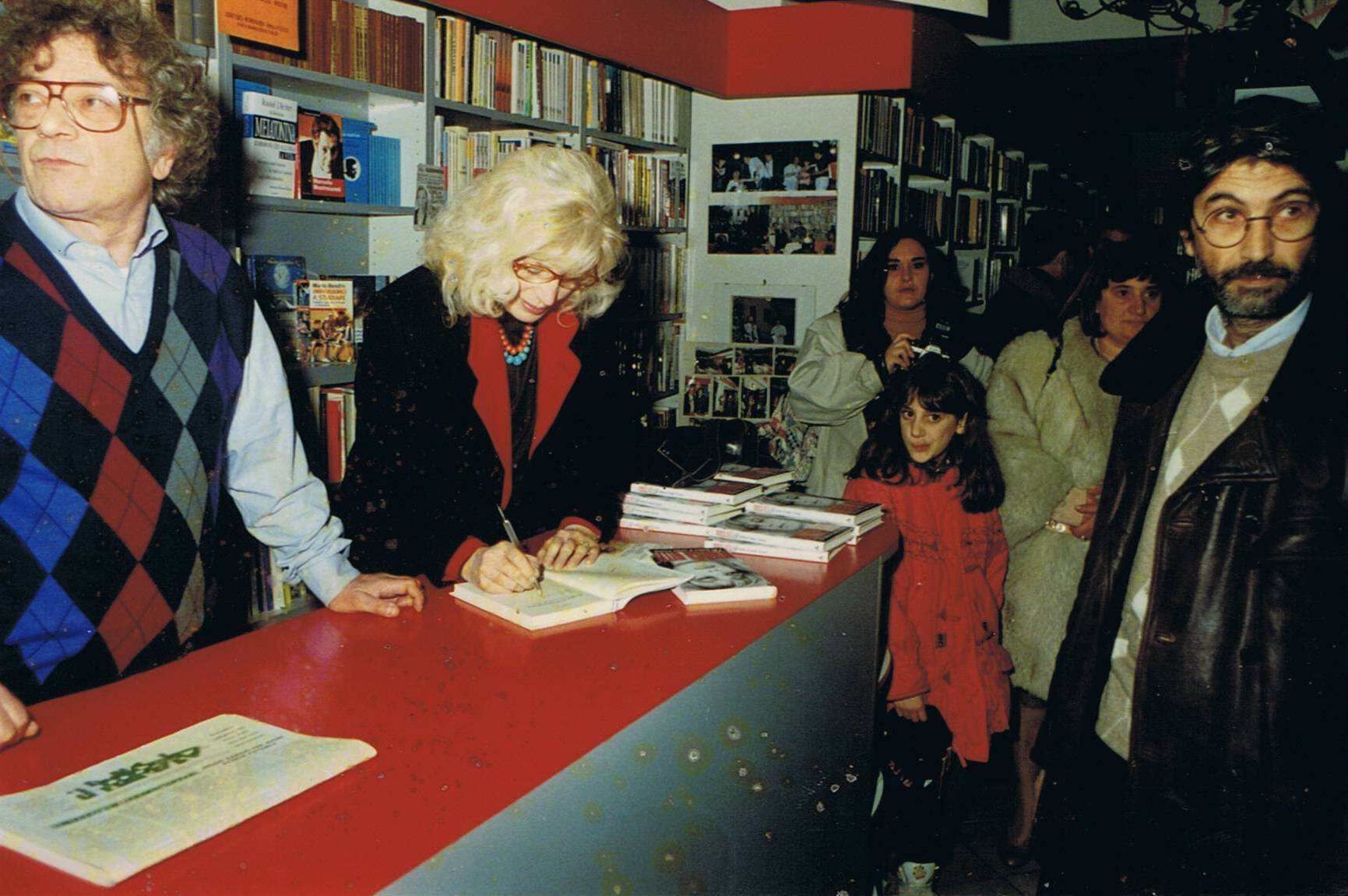
Monica Vitti with Beppe Costa at Pellicanolibri

- 1984 Vilipendio alla tolleranza, Giovanni Arcuri
- 1984 Nei preparativi del volo, Giuseppe Frazzetto
- 1984 In cielo, Alvaro De Angelis
- 1984 Come quando, Domenico Agnello
- 1984 Angeli, Enzo Salsetta
- 1984 Morire a rate, Angelo Cirignotta
- 1985 L'occhio dell'ape, Vincenzo Crapio
- 1986 Pece, Francesco Rivera
- 1986 Il porto del cielo, Georges de Canino
- 1986 Lo sguardo finito, Gianni Busco
- 1986 Candida suite, Santino Cicala
- 1987 Una stagione in purgatorio, Franco Vitaterna
- 1987 Sperando con rabbia, Giuseppe Lizza
- 1987 Teresa e le amiche, it:Francesco Scrima
- 1988 Il dolore infinito, Jeph Anelli
- 1988 Per incantamento, Antonello Cuzzaniti
- 1989 La finta macchia, Carmelo Zaffora
- 1989 A colloquio con io, Elena Andrei

=== Series: Saggi ===
- 1978 I chierici traditi interventions on contemporary literature, it:Sebastiano Addamo
- 1978 La filosofia del non, Gaston Bachelard
- 1978 Potere e violenza nel romanzo italiano del seicento, Donata Ortolani
- 1978 Risorgimento e società nei canti popolari siciliani introduction by it:Luigi Maria Lombardi Satriani, it:Antonino Uccello
- 1980 La critica testuale e i problemi della tradizione manoscritta slava medievale, Giacoma Strano

=== Series: Dialettica e sviluppo ===
- 1977 Potere e società in Sicilia nella crisi dello stato liberale, it:Giuseppe Barone - it:Salvatore Lupo - R. Palidda - M. Saija
- 1979 Politica e finanza nell'Italia liberale, it:Giuseppe Barone
- 1979 Partecipazione potere e sviluppo: saggi sulla politica locale, Raimondo Catanzaro

=== Series: Ventunesimo secolo ===
- 1984 La musa meccanica preface by Ciro Vitiello, Marco Amendolara
- 1988 it:Dante Maffia, La poesia come azione e come dizione, Luigi Reina

=== Series: Interventi ===
- 1978 Riflessioni sulla crisi economica mondiale, Andre Gunder Frank
- 1979 Lettera ai militanti comunisti spagnoli, Fernando Arrabal, translation by Beppe Costa
- 1979 La causa delle donne, fr:Giséle Halimi
- 1979 Il filosofo-artista, Jean-Noel Vuarnet
- 1979 Il giudice, le istituzioni, la crisi dello stato, M.D. it:Magistratura democratica
- 1979 Educazione e utopia nell'opera di H. Marcuse, Flavia Tricomi
- 1981 A scuola con il giornale, it:Graziella Priulla
- 1991 Lettere al direttore, Delia Magnani Donadio

=== Series: Fuori collana ===
- 1978 Sicilia, guida ai monumenti, Beppe Costa - Luccjo Cammarata
- 1984 Chiarezza sui tumori, Antonino Finocchiaro
- 1986 Canto d'amore, Beppe Costa
- 1986 Procedere con la stella, Grazia Lago
- 1988 Killarney- Castiglione di Sicilia: un gemellaggio, AA. VV
- 1993 Il giocoliere, Cristina Romano
- 1995 Premio Casalotti, antologia poetica, AA. VV.
- 1996 d'Amore e d'Altro, Beppe Costa

=== Series: Pensiero militante ===
- 1977 Lo sciopero generale e l'organizzazione del proletariato, Fernand Pelloutier
- 1978 Scritti sul socialismo, Georges Eugène Sorel
- 1978 Revisionismo e ministerialismo in Italia 1899/1902, Alfio Signorelli
- 1979 Marxismo e questione agraria, Antonino Criscione
- 1981 Condizione della donna - condizione operaia, Etienne Cabet

== Related items ==
- Beppe Costa
- Dario Bellezza
