= Mauro Macario =

Italian poet, essayist and director (born 1947)

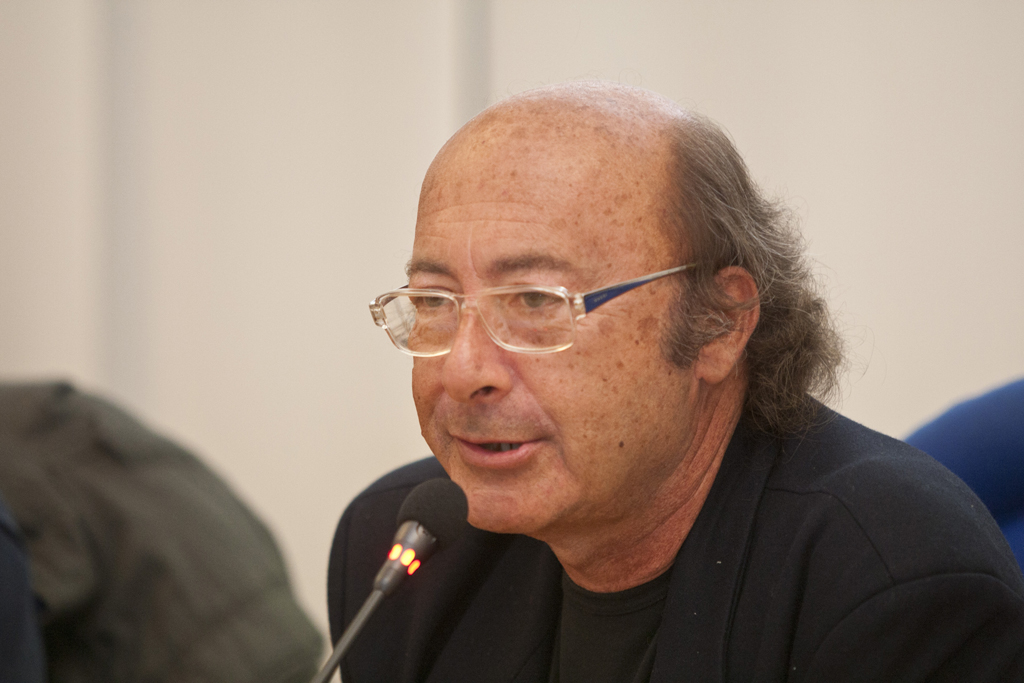
- Macario in 2010
- Born: 21 February 1947 (age 79); Santa Margherita Ligure, Italy
- Occupations: Poet; essayist; theatre and television director

Mauro Macario (born 21 February 1947) is an Italian poet, essayist and director.

== Biography ==
Born from the union of Erminio Macario (1902–1980) and Giulia Dardanelli (1921–2015), after attending the School of Dramatic Art of Piccolo Teatro (Milan) and at the end of a long apprenticeship as an assistant director with Bruno Corbucci has started to film directing, then at the theater, and finally to the television caring for RAI programs on music.

=== Direction ===
- Perché si uccidono Prod. Mondialfilm 1976. Con Maurice Ronet, Beba Lončar, Eleonora Fani, Antonio Pierfederici, Luciano Rossi;
- La moglie ebrea (da Tamburi nella notte di Bertolt Brecht);
- La fanciulla da marito di Eugène Ionesco (teatro Tys club -Milano 1964);
- Gran bontà della vita tratto da Quattro commedie per la rivoluzione nera di LeRoi Jones, Compagnia Teatro del Salto, Torino 1976;
- Da quale mondo vieni? di Mauro Macario, Peter Kolosimo, Lino Aldani; compagnia Mauro Macario -Teatro della Fantascienza-Teatro Erba, Torino 1978;
- Macario, il sogno di una maschera con Mauro Macario, Gianluigi Cavaliere, Valeria Fabiano, Cinzia Fontana, Sara D'Agostino, compagnia "I Passatisti", stagione teatrale 2009–2010;
- Alma Matrix di Léo Ferré Compagnia "I Passatisti" estate teatrale 2011;
- Licenza di ridere di Mauro Macario, recital di Erminio Macario, teatro Tenda Bussoladomani e tournée 1977;
- Oplà giochiamo insieme di Mauro Macario, Compagnia Erminio Macario, Teatro Macario, Torino 1979;
- Buonasera con... Macario con E. Macario, Rai 2 1980;
- Buonasera con... Milva con Milva, Teo Teocoli, Massimo Boldi, e ospiti canori. Rai 2 1982;
- Un'ora per voi con Tino Scotti, D. Piombi, R. Attivissimo. Rai Svizzera Italiana, 1981;
- Concerto all'italiana con C. Villa, Paola Tedesco. Rai 2 1980;
- Il cappello sulle ventitré varietà musicale con ospiti canori. Rai 2 1984;
- Popcorn passerella musicale internazionale con ospiti canori. Canale 5, 1983.

=== Theater author ===
- Un regolamento di conti atto unico. Compagnia teatrale E. Macario, Teatro Carignano Torino 1972.
- Sganarello medicosifaperdire commedia buffa in due tempi scritta alla maniera di Molière da M. Macario e C.M.Pensa. Compagnia Macario, Teatro Macario, Torino 1977.
- Macario, il sogno di una maschera Compagnia "I Passatisti" 2009–2010.
- Alma Matrix di Léo Ferré, traduzione e adattamento teatrale. Compagnia "I Passatisti" estate teatrale 2011.
- Pierrot-de Sade: Match dell'anno zero Compagnia Paolo Paoloni, Teatro delle Muse, Roma 1975.
- Licenza di ridere Compagnia E. Macario, 1977.
- Picnic al Musiné (dallo spettacolo Da quale mondo vieni?) Compagnia M.Macario-Teatro Erba, Torino 1978.
- Oplà giochiamo insieme Compagnia Macario, Teatro Macario, Torino 1979.
- Buonasera con Macario co-autore con Leo Chiosso e Sergio D'Ottavi 1979.
- Perché si uccidono, soggetto e sceneggiatura. Film 1976.

== Biographer of his father ==
Biographer of his father Erminio Macario for which he wrote the biography titled Macario, a comedian fallen from the moon, that traces the artist's life from birth in an attic of Porta Palazzo in Turin, to the success on the international stage, dedicated in 2004 a specific autobiographical novel inspired by the world of the magazine:Ballerina in a row. In it is described in detail, around a love story between a young actor and a Nordic dancer, the world of Variety, which he attended as a teenager in the sixties. It is November 2007, a new revision biographical most private titled Macario, my father.

== Poetry and music ==
As a poet he has participated in several editions of the International Poetry Festival of Genoa and other Rassegne similar both in Italy and abroad, especially in France, his country of choice. Since 2003 collaborates with Gianluigi Cavaliere leader of Chantango, Italian musical ensemble that explores the combination of poetry and music in a show called Tangando poets and in a recital dedicated to Léo Ferré entitled Ni Dieu Ni Maitre. In the album Bestiary love of the group Chantango is inserted a poem by Mauro Macario, Sam, set to music and sung by Gianluigi Cavaliere with recitatives work by the same author.

== Bibliography ==
=== Essay ===
- Leo Ferré, il cantore dell'immaginario, a cura di M. Macario, Elèuthera, 1992, ISBN 9788885861473.
- Léo Ferré, L'arte della rivolta, a cura di Mauro Macario, Selene edizioni, 2003, ISBN 9788886267618.
- Léo Ferré "Alma Matrix, Liberodiscrivere 2011 traduzione di Mauro Macario, ISBN 9788873883210.
- Macario, un comico caduto dalla luna, biografia Baldini Castoldi Dalai Editore, 1998, ISBN 9788880895275.
- Ballerina di fila, romanzo, Aliberti editore, 2004, ISBN 9788874240470.
- Macario, mio padre, memorialistico. Campanotto editore, 2007, ISBN 9788845605031.
- Fabrizio De André in volo per il mondo, Mori editore, 2001-foto di R. Kohl -saggio di Mauro Macario, ISBN 9788886561051.
- Volammo davvero Bur, 2007, a cura di Elena Valdini, Fondazione Fabrizio De André, ISBN 9788817015035.
- Un poeta cieco di rabbia, Liberodiscrivere, 2004 antologia poetica di Riccardo Mannerini, e saggio introduttivo a cura di Mauro Macario, ISBN 978-88-7388-045-5.
- Il sogno e l'avventura, Liberodiscrivere 2009, poesie di Riccardo Mannerini a cura di Francesco De Nicola e Maria Teresa Caprile con un saggio di Mauro Macario sul rapporto tra i poeti in musica e i poeti letterari, ISBN 9788873882367.

Articles and essays in magazines A, Poesia, Libertaria, Volontà, La Danza, Primafila.

=== Poetry ===
In 1990, at the end of an artistic-existential drawn from disparate experiences, approaches to poetry. Between 1990 and 2012 published six books of poetry:

- Le ali della jena, pref. di Léo Ferré, Lubrina Editore 1990, ISBN 9788877660787.
- Crimini naturali, pref. di Lucio Klobas, Book Editore, 199, ISBN 978-88-7232-083-9.
- Il Cantico della resa mortale, pref. di Giuseppe Pederiali, Book Editore,1994. ISBN 9788872321706.
- Il Destino di essere altrove,(riunisce i primi tre libri, più la nuova raccolta "La piantagione dei relitti") pref. di Francesco De Nicola, Campanotto 2003, ISBN 978-88-456-0504-8.
- Silenzio a Occidente, pref. Francesco De Nicola, Liberodiscrivere, 2007 (con CD), ISBN 9788873881193.
- La Screanza,( Premio Montale "Fuori di casa", 2012) pref. Rodolfo Di Biasio, Liberodiscrivere 2012, ISBN 9788873883692.

=== Anthologies ===
Macario is present, with poetry, translations and essays on his work in many anthologies:

- Tre generazioni di poeti italiani -Una antologia del Secondo Novecento, a cura di F. De Nicola -G.Manacorda, Caramanica editore 2005
- Il mondo attorno a un verso? a cura di G. Occhipinti-Rubbettino Editore 2010, ISBN 978-88-498-2681-4.
- Il Novecento Letterario Italiano a cura di F. De Nicola. De Ferrari Editore 2009, ISBN 9788864050874.
- Italia chiamò a cura di F.De Nicola. De Ferrari Editore, 2011, ISBN 9788864052069.
- Dizionario degli scrittori liguri a cura di F. Pastorino-M. Venturini-F. De Nicola. De Ferrari editore 2007, ISBN 9788871729091.
- Altramarea -Poesia come cosa viva a cura di Angelo Tonelli, Campanotto, 2006, ISBN 884560800X.
- I Limoni, a cura di F. De Nicola-G. Manacorda. Caramanica Editore, 1996.
- Antologia francese Les Chaiers de poésie-rencontres/et la poesié ligurienne du XXème siècle 1999 réalisé par Francesco De Nicola et Marc Porcu, traduction: Monique Baccelli et Marc Porcu.
- Léo Ferré -entretiens entre peau et jactance di Claude Figara -Christian Pirot editeur, 2003.
- Album Arthur Rimbaud a cura di Eileen Romano, Einaudi-Gallimard, Biblioteca della Pleiade, 1992. (Mauro Macario is featured in the book as the discoverer of Rimbaud's house in Milan), ISBN 9788844600044.
- Ottagono-17 racconti su Milano a cura di Gerardo Mastrullo, Edizioni La vita felice, 1995 (Lorenzo Morandotti's story "On the Tracks" describes Mauro Macario's search that led him to the discovery of Arthur Rimbaud's house in Milan), ISBN 9788886314428.
