= Davide Rondoni =

Italian poet and writer

Davideo Rondoni
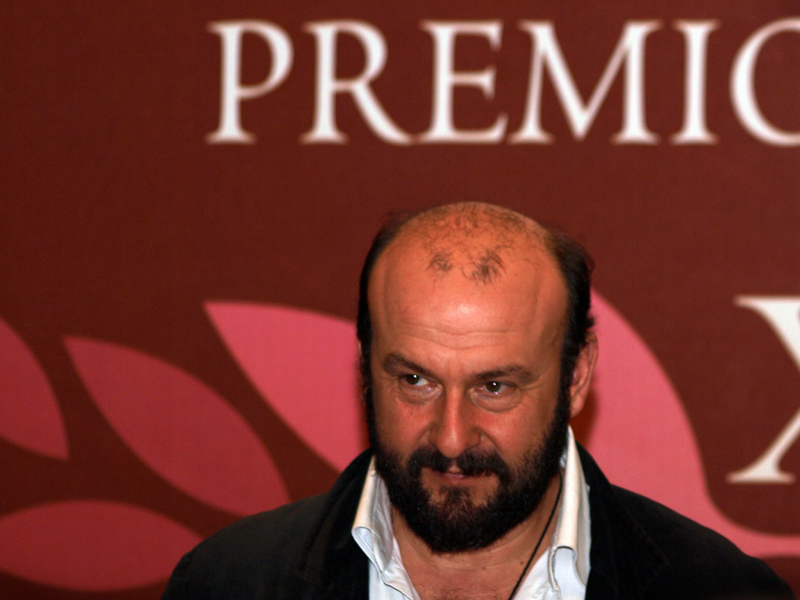
- Born: 1964 (age 61–62); Forlì, Italy
- Known for: poetry;

Davide Rondoni (born 1964) is an Italian poet and writer.

== Biography ==
He graduated in literature at the University of Bologna with Ezio Raimondi. He founded the Center for Contemporary Poetry of the University of Bologna. He has written several collections of poetry, published in Italy and abroad.

== Works ==
=== Poetry ===
- La frontiera delle ginestre, Forum/Quinta generazione, 1985
- O les invalides, N.c.e., 1988
- A rialzare i capi pioventi, N.c.e - Guaraldi, 1993
- Nel tempo delle cose cieche, N.c.e, 1995
- Il bar del tempo, Guanda, 1999
- Non sei morto, amore, postfazione di Mario Luzi, Quaderni del battello ebbro, 2001. 2ª ed. con prefazione di Giancarlo Quiriconi, Carabba, 2006
- Avrebbe amato chiunque, Guanda, 2003
- Compianto, vita, Marietti, 2003
- Il veleno, l'arte, Marietti, 2004
- L'acqua visitata dal fuoco, Marietti, 2005
- Vorticosa, dipinta, Marietti, 2006
- Via Crucis dell'amico, Marietti, 2007
- Apocalisse amore, Mondadori, 2008
- Le parole accese. Poesie per bambini e non, Rizzoli, 2009
- 3. Tommaso, Paolo, Michelangelo, Marietti, 2009
- Ballo lentamente con le tue ombre. Poesie per il tango, Tracce, 2009
- Rimbambimenti. Poesie di tipo romagnolo, Raffaelli, 2011
- Si tira avanti solo con lo schianto, WhyFly Press, 2013
- Cinque donne e un'onda, Ianieri Editore, 2015
- La natura del bastardo, Mondadori, 2017
- Il buio e l'ibisco. Parole per la fiasca rotta del maestro di Forlì, Cartacanta, 2017

=== Narrative ===
- I santi scemi, Guaraldi, 1996
- I bambini nascono come le poesie, Fabbri, 2006
- Hermann, una vita storta e santa puntata alle stelle, BUR, 2010
- Gesù, un racconto sempre nuovo, Piemme, 2014
- Se tu fossi qui, San Paolo Edizioni, 2015; Si estuvieras aquí, Mensajero, 2016, Vers le phare, La joie de lire, 2018;
- E se brucia anche il cielo, Frassinelli, 2015
- Il bacio di Siviglia. L'uomo che fu don Giovanni, San Paolo, 2016
- Best, San Paolo, 2018
- Quasi un paradiso. Viaggio in Romagna. La terra del pensiero simpatico, SEM, 2020
- Il concerto del viale dei lecci, Aboca, 2022
