= Adele Cambria =

Italian journalist, writer and actress

Adele Cambria (12 July 1931, in Reggio Calabria – 5 November 2015, in Rome) was an Italian journalist, writer and actress.

== Biography ==
She was a central figure in Italian culture before, during, and after the 1968 movement alongside Camilla Cederna and Oriana Fallaci, and was close to the progressive left and to the Partito Radicale under Marco Pannella. She was also a longtime supporter of the feminist movement. Cambria collaborated with newspapers and magazines and published several books. She graduated in law from the University of Messina. She became involved with journalism in 1956 after moving to Rome, where she remained until her death.

An author of narrative works (and of other genres) intended for the theater, she was a founder of the Teatro La Maddalena in Rome alongside Dacia Maraini. She was also a friend of Pier Paolo Pasolini and acted in several of his films.

With other progressive intellectuals she gave her support and authority as the director of the daily newspaper Lotta Continua (but did not contribute to the political direction) to guarantee freedom of expression and to allow the newspaper to publish. In 1972 however, she was put on trial (later acquitted) for an article on the assassination of Luigi Calabresi, following which she quit for not sharing the opinion of the paper. In the following years she joined the Italian Socialist Party.

== Journalism ==
Cambria first began her work as a journalist in 1956 writing for the newspaper Il Giorno, when it had just been founded by Gaetano Baldacci. She further collaborated with Il Mondo and Mario Pannunzio, and later returned to write for Il Giorno from 1985 to 1997. Other journalistic collaborations include:

- Paese Sera
- La Stampa (with Specchio della Stampa)
- Il Messaggero
- L'Espresso (with Arrigo Benedetti)
- L'Europeo
- Il Giorno
- Il Diario della settimana
- Il Domani della Calabria (from 2000 to 2002)
- L'Unità (from 2003)
- Effe (director of the magazine in the 1970s)
- Noi donne (cofounder, from 1969 to 1999)

== Television ==
She worked with RAI beginning in 1963, and between 2000 and 2003 reached 39 transmissions for RaiSat on the program E la Tv non creò la donna. She then acted in Trittico meridionale, three broadcasts on Southern Italy dedicated respectively to Ernesto de Martino (La terra del rimorso), Maria Occhipinti (La rivolta dei non-si-parte), and Reggio Calabria (Dalla rivolta al professore). In 2003, she signed on to the pilot episode of a television series dedicated to the history of gossip on RaiSat. From 2011, she was conferred a feature on the talk show Le invasioni barbariche on La7.

== Literary works ==
- Maria Josè (Longanesi, biography and unedited diaries of the last queen of Italy, 1966)
- Dopo Didone (Cooperativa Prove 10, novel, 1974)
- Amore come rivoluzione – La risposta alle lettere dal carcere di Antonio Gramsci (Sugarco, letters of the three Schucht sisters, the youngest of which, Giulia, was married to Gramsci; 1976)
- In principio era Marx (Sugarco, 1978)
- Il Lenin delle donne (Mastrogiacomo, 1981)
- L'Italia segreta delle donne (Newton Compton Editori, 1984)
- Nudo di donna con rovine (Pellicanolibri), romanzo, 1984)
- L'amore è cieco (Stampa Alternativa, stories, 1995)
- Tu volevi un figlio carabiniere (Stampa Alternativa, written with son Luciano Valli, 1997)
- Isabella. La triste storia di Isabella di Morra (Osanna Venosa, 1997)
- Storia d'amore e schiavitù (Marsilio, 2000, finalist for the prize named to Elsa Morante and at the Città di Scalea; in contest for the Strega Prize, seventh place)
- Nove dimissioni e mezzo (Donzelli Editore, 2010)
- Istanbul. Il doppio viaggio, (Donzelli Editore, 2012)
- In viaggio con la Zia (Città del Sole edizioni, December 2012)

== Theater ==
- Nonostante Gramsci (rappresentato in prima nazionale al Teatro della Maddalena on 25 May 1975)
- In principio era Marx – La moglie e la fedele governante (prima italiana al Teatro Bellini di Napoli, 1980, Premio Fondi La Pastora 1979)
- La regina dei cartoni (1985–2001, rappresentato all'Istituto Italiano di Cultura di Los Angeles dal Collettivo teatrale "Isabella Morra")

Directed:

- Di madre in madre, by Muzi Epifani and Francesca Pansa, Teatro La Maddalena, Rome, 1978.

== Filmography ==
- Accattone, di Pier Paolo Pasolini (1961)
- Comizi d'amore, di Pier Paolo Pasolini (1965)
- Teorema, di Pier Paolo Pasolini (1968)
- Teresa la ladra, di Carlo Di Palma (1973)

== Recognition ==
- Received the journalistic prize "Corrado Alvaro" for her career (2008)
- The Premio Letterario awarded by the city of Palmi (2011)
- Ottobre in Poesia, received the "poetic key" to the city (2012)
