= Naim Araidi =

Israeli Druze academic and writer

- نعيم عرايدي
- Born: April 2, 1950; Maghar, Israel
- Died: October 2, 2015 (aged 65)
- Occupations: Academic, writer, ambassador
- Known for: Poetry in Hebrew and Arabic

Naim Araidi (Arabic: نعيم عرايدي, Hebrew: נעים עריידי; April 2, 1950 – October 2, 2015) was an Israeli Druze academic, Israeli Ambassador to Norway, and writer known for his poems in both Hebrew and Arabic.

== Education ==
Araidi was born in Maghar, Israel and completed his elementary school in his village, then moved to Haifa to complete his secondary education. He went on to gain B.A in Hebrew language and Political Science and another B.A in Hebrew Literature and Comparative Literature. Then he gained a M.A in Hebrew Literature and Comparative Literature at the University of Haifa. This was followed with a Ph.D in Hebrew Literature from Bar-Ilan University. His doctoral thesis was on the poetry of Uri Zvi Greenberg.

== Work and writing career ==
He served as an instructor and a lecturer in both the University of Haifa and Bar-Ilan University. Then he moved to Gordon College and the Arab College for Education in Israel. He then served as the Director of the Children's Literature center at the Arab College as well as the coordinator of Studies for the Non-Jewish students at Gordon College. Dr. Naim presented two weekly programmes on Channel 2, a children's programme and a news programme. He also established "Al-Sewar" magazine. He held many public positions and participated in a large number of international festivals for writing and poetry. Many of Araidi's published works appear in translation. For the first time in Italy in 2014 an anthology of his poems was published by Seam Edizioni. The first edition was presented during the roman poetical twinning with Ottobre in Poesia in 2013. The second edition occasioned a tour organized by the same publisher and poets Uke Bucpapaj Beppe Costa, Stefania Battistella who translated the work.

== Nissan Festival ==
Araidi established the Nissan organization for Literature in 1999. The international Nissan Festival is held annually in April in Maghar.

== Ambassadorship ==
In April 2012, Araidi was supposed to serve as Israeli ambassador to New Zealand. In June, that decision was changed and he was instead appointed as ambassador to Norway where he served until 2014, when he resigned after allegations of “inappropriate behaviour.”

== Personal life ==
In June 2024, Araidi's 43-year-old son Rabia was found decapitated in the Bedouin town of Basmat Tab’un. He was reportedly murdered amid a criminal dispute.

== Published works ==
=== In Hebrew ===
- Is Love Possible
- In Five Dimensions
- Soldier of Water
- Perhaps it Love
- Back to the Village
- Compassion and Fear

=== In Arabic ===
- Devils and Graves
- As Illusions of Land
- As Illusion of the Sun
- Alone
- Hope is Forever
- Songs of the Carmel in Maritime Love

=== In Italian ===
- Canzoni di Galilea ISBN 9788881795154, Seam Ed. (2013, 2° ed. 2014)

== Prizes and awards ==
- Prime Minister's Award for Hebrew Literature, 1986
- Creative award for Arabic Literature
- Senate of Paris Award, 1990
- Honorary doctorate, The International Center for Poetry, USA, 1991
- Prize awarded by "Omanut La'am for the Promotion of Culture in Israel", 1993
