= Luce d'Eramo =

Italian writer and literary critic

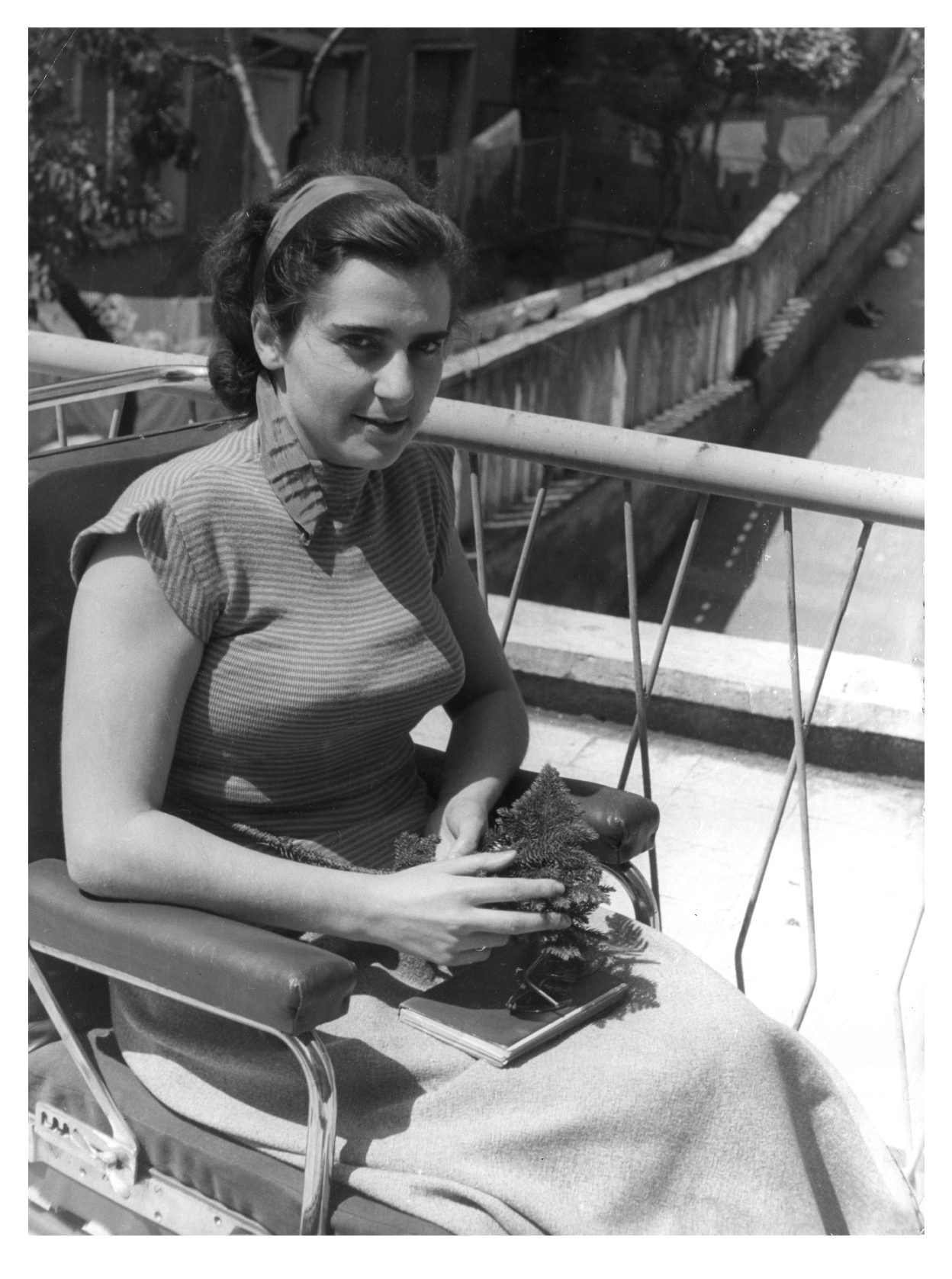
- Born: Lucette Mangione; June 17, 1925; Reims, France
- Died: March 6, 2001 (aged 75); Rome, Italy
- Resting place: Non-Catholic Cemetery, Rome
- Citizenship: Italian
- Education: Sapienza University of Rome
- Occupations: Novelist and literary critics
- Spouse: Pacifico d'Eramo (1946–1956)
- Children: de: Marco d'Eramo
- Writing career
- Language: Italian
- Notable works: Deviazione, Partiranno

Luce d’Eramo (June 17, 1925 – March 6, 2001) was an Italian writer and literary critic. She is best known for her autobiographical novel Deviazione, which recounts her experiences in Germany during World War II. D’Eramo's writings are characterized by interest toward controversial subjects and a search of solutions that would liberate people from physical and mental constraints.

== Biography ==
=== Early life ===
Luce d’Eramo (née Lucette Mangione) was born in 1925 in Reims, France. The daughter of Italian parents, she lived in France until the age of fourteen.

Her father, an illustrator and painter, lived in Paris from 1912 until 1915 and went back to Italy to fight in the Italian army during the First World War, as a military airplane pilot. After the war he got married and the couple moved back to France where he started a building company. Luce was the youngest of three daughters, of whom the oldest one died in infancy. Her mother served as a voluntary secretary of the Italian Fascio in Paris assisting Italian immigrant workers.

In 1938 Luce and her family returned to Italy and stayed at her maternal grandmother's house in Alatri, near Rome. There Luce attended a classical liceo (high school). The change of scene proved a social and cultural shock as Luce tried to adjust to her new life in Italy. The Parisian reality with its modern values and diverse political movements (in 1936, members of the workers' Front Populaire held demonstrations directly below their house) was in sharp contrast to the backward reality of the rural areas Lazio, where processions of barefoot pilgrims walked to the Sanctuary of the Certosa di Trisulti, singing at the top of their voices. Priests and monks were everywhere because their convent stood right behind her grandmother's garden. In Io sono un’aliena, Luce recalled how children in France branded her as the “petite macaroni” (the little macaroni girl) which her Italian classmates from Liceo “Conti Gentili” replaced with a condescending “la francesina” (the little French girl). The sense of separateness, of being an outsider without any permanent roots contributed to d’Eramo’s deep sensitivity to the plight of “the other.”

=== Youth and the war ===
After the outbreak of World War II, her father joined the military service as a pilot and later started working for the news office of the air force. The family moved to Rome where Lucetta (as the family called her) attended the last year at the classical liceo “Umberto” (now “Pilo Albertelli”). After graduation she enrolled in the Faculty of Letters at the university of Rome and became a member of GUF (Association of Fascist Students), a natural choice for a girl brought up in a fascist family.

After the fall of fascism, on July 25, 1943, Luce followed her family to Bassano del Grappa in northern Italy, where her father was nominated to be the undersecretary of the air force in the Republic of Salò (a puppet state led by Mussolini and supported by Nazi Germany and Italian fascist loyalists). While in Bassano del Grappa, Luce heard disturbing news about mass deportations and atrocities committed in Nazi camps. Torn between the idealistic loyalty to fascism and her own, ever-growing doubts, on February 7, 1944, she decided to find out the truth.

She left her family to take on a job as a factory worker in Germany and was sent to a labor camp at the Siemens plant, and later at the IG Farben plant in Frankfurt. The brutal awakening to the cruel reality of oppression and exploitation carried on in the camps pushed her to take an active part in the resistance against the Nazis. She supported the Russian prisoners in solidarity with their plight and participated in a strike organized by the French resistance. After being imprisoned she tried to commit suicide. Because of her family’s political position she was released and sent to Italy. On her way back home, passing through Verona, she realized that she could not return to her previous life. She threw away her documents, joined a group of deportees being sent to Germany, and ended up in the Dachau concentration camp. She escaped from the camp during an air raid and began the nomadic life of a clandestine vagrant, taking on the most menial jobs to survive in a Germany plagued by relentless air raids of the Allied forces. On February 27, 1945, in Mainz, Luce was helping rescue the wounded buried under the rubble of a bombed building when a wall crumbled on top of her. She was gravely injured and the damage to her spine caused permanent paralysis to both legs, resulting in a handicap that would impact the rest of her life.

=== Post-war period ===
After the war ended, Luce returned to Italy and spent some time in Bologna as a patient in the Rizzoli Clinic where she met Pacifico d’Eramo, a survivor of the Russian campaign recovering from sustained injuries. They married and moved to Rome, where Pacifico became a professor of philosophy. They had a son, Marco, who was born in 1947. The marriage turned unhappy and ended in separation years later. Luce continued to use her married name even after the divorce.

Once back in Italy, Luce resumed her studies, earning both her degrees in literature in 1951 (with a thesis on the poetics of Giacomo Leopardi) and philosophy in 1954 (with a thesis on Kant’s Critique of Judgment).

After the publication of her first book Idilli in coro by a small publishing house in 1951, she met Alberto Moravia who admired her as a writer and accepted her short story Thomasbräu (later included in the novel Deviazione) for a prestigious magazine, “Nuovi Argomenti.” Next came a highly original essay entitled Raskolnikow and Marxism, (1960, reprinted in 1997) in which she engaged with Moravia in a discussion regarding the Soviet Union.

In Finché la testa vive (1963), a short novel also later included in Deviazione, she confronted the trauma of becoming disabled at the age of nineteen. In 1966 her writing career was profoundly affected by an encounter with Ignazio Silone, who became her lifelong friend and the subject of an acute critical study L’opera di Ignazio Silone published by Arnoldo Mondadori in 1971. In this monumental piece of meticulous research and original insight, d’Eramo examines the resistance of the Italian cultural milieu to a native Italian writer who achieved world fame as one of the greatest figures of the literary scene in the twentieth century.

In the years of the so-called “strategy of tension,” d’Eramo’s friend, Camilla Cederna (a Milanese journalist) brought to her attention the case of Giangiacomo Feltrinelli, the famous publisher who, according to the official version and the police, was blown up while placing an explosive under a high-voltage pole. D’Eramo’s essay "Cruciverba politico. Come funziona in Italia la strategia della diversione", offers a penetrating analysis of how the Italian press handled this case.

D’Eramo rose to fame with the novel Deviazione, begun a few years after her return to Italy, but eventually finished and published over thirty years later, in 1979. Deviazione is an autobiographical novel that recounts the dramatic events experienced in her youth. It is also a mystery of memory: the memory of a deeply wounded woman who had to contend with the difficulty of recovering the true meaning of her war experience in the post-war context and of returning to the social sphere she had so hard struggled to escape.

After Deviazione d’Eramo published several other novels and short stories. She spent the rest of her life writing and travelling in Europe, United States, and Japan. In 1980 she spent a year in Berlin as a writer guest of the DAAD (Deutscher Akademiker Austauschdienst [The German Academic Exchange Service]).

During the entirety of her career as a writer, d’Eramo also collaborated with a variety of magazines (Nuovi Argomenti, La Fiera Letteraria, Studi Cattolici, Nuova Antologia, Tempo Presente) and newspapers (Il manifesto, L’Unità and Avvenire).

She died in Rome on 6 March 2001. She was buried at the Non-Catholic Cemetery in Rome (also referred to as the Protestant Cemetery or the Cemetery for Foreigners) where John Keats, P. B. Shelley, and Antonio Gramsci are also buried.

== Works ==
D’Eramo’s writings have been gravitated toward controversial subjects, in search of solutions that would liberate people from thousands of physical and mental constraints. This pursuit would lead them toward an acceptance of the unknown and of “the other,” abolishing barriers that divide and exclude, thus allowing for a congenial coexistence on our planet, a tiny speck in the universe.

After addressing the issues of Nazism and World War II in Deviazione and in short stories (collected in 1999 under the title Racconti quasi di guerra), Luce d’Eramo has confronted a variety of hard situations, involving social and psychological problems: the fight of dissident communist groups during the period of terror and “urban guerrilla” in Italy, called “the years of lead,” in the novel Nucleo Zero (1981); the plight of the elderly in Ultima luna (1993); the emotional deafness of young nazi skinheads in Si prega di non disturbare (1995); the mental illness in Una strana fortuna (1997); and finally, in Un’estate difficile, the psychological portrait of a domineering husband and a wife who fights for autonomy and faces the break-up of her marriage, despite the rigid social and cultural conditions existing in Italy in the fifties.

The novel which d’Eramo herself regarded as her favorite was Partiranno (1986). It is a poignant chronicle of the stay on earth of the Nnoberavezi, gentle aliens who thirst for knowledge. D’Eramo’s passionate interest in them stems from her own sense of “alienation,” as she revealed in her last book-interview Io sono un’aliena, published in 1999, two years before her death.

Her best-known work Deviazione became a bestseller and sold hundreds of thousands of copies. It was translated into French, German, and Japanese. The novel Nucleo Zero, translated into German and Spanish, was adapted into a movie directed by Carlo Lizzani in 1984. Excerpts from Una strana fortuna (A Strange Fate) were translated into English and appeared in the anthology Resisting Bodies, Narratives of Italian Women Partisans (2008).

Fiction

- Idilli in coro, Gastaldi, Milano1951.
- Finché la testa vive, Rizzoli, Milano 1964.
- Deviazione, Mondadori, Milano 1979; Feltrinelli, Milano 2012.
- Nucleo zero, Mondadori, Milano 1981.
- Partiranno, Mondadori, Milano 1986.
- Ultima luna, Mondadori, Milano 1993.
- Si prega di non disturbare, Rizzoli, Milano 1995.
- Una strana fortuna, Mondadori, Milano 1997.
- Racconti quasi di guerra, Mondadori, Milano1999.
- Un'estate difficile, Mondadori, Milano 2001 (posthumous).
- Il 25 luglio, Elliot Edizioni, Roma 2013.
- Tutti i racconti (Cecilia Bello Minciacchi ed.), Elliot Edizioni, Roma 2013.

Essays

- Raskolnikov e il marxismo. Note a un libro di Moravia e altri scritti, Esse, Milano 1960; Pellicanolibri, Roma 1997.
- L'opera di Ignazio Silone. Saggio critico e guida bibliografica, Mondadori, Milano 1971.
- Cruciverba politico, Guaraldi, 1974.
- (ed., with Gabriella Sobrino), Europa in versi: la poesia femminile del '900, Il ventaglio, Roma 1989
- Ignazio Silone, Ed. Riminesi Associati, Rimini 1994.
- Io sono un’aliena, Edizioni Lavoro, Roma 1999.
- Ignazio Silone, Castelvecchi, Roma 2014 (Yukari Saito, ed.) The volume contains L'opera di Ignazio Silone published in 1971, d’Eramo’s writings on Silone published in 1994, and the unpublished d’Eramo’s personal correspondence with Silone.

== Bibliography ==
In English:

- Rita C. Cavigioli, Luce d’Eramo: "Ultima luna", in Women of a Certain Age. Contemporary Italian Fictions of Female Aging, Fairleigh Dickinson University Press, Madison (N.J) 2005, pp. 132–152.
- Rosetta D’Angelo, Barbara Zaczek, Luce d’Eramo: “Una strana fortuna”, in Resisting Bodies. Narratives of Italian Partisan Women, “Annali di Italianistica”, Chapel Hill (N.C.), 2008, pp. 173–182.

An extensive bibliography on Luce d’Eramo’s writings is included in the 2012 edition of Deviazione, published by Feltrinelli. In addition are the following:

- Daniella Ambrosino, Temi, strutture e linguaggio nei romanzi di Luce d'Eramo, “Linguistica e letteratura” XXVI (2001), pp. 195–251.
- Marco d’Eramo and Piersandro Vanzan (eds), Speciale Luce d’Eramo, in “Prospettiva persona” n. 44, XII (2003). It is a dossier of the series “Prospettiva Donna”, dedicated to Luce d’Eramo.
- Anna Maria Crispino and Marco d’Eramo (eds), Come intendersi con l’altro, “Leggendaria”, suppl. n. 99, March 2013. It is a special dossier about Luce d’Eramo, published on the “Giornata di studi” (One-day study meeting) the magazine “Leggendaria” dedicated to her, with contributions by Anna Maria Crispino, Marco d’Eramo, Daniella Ambrosino, Maria Rosa Cutrufelli, Bia Sarasini, Stefania Lucamante, Mariella Gramaglia, Barbara Zaczek, Cecilia Bello Minciacchi, Corinne Lucas-Fiorato.
- Angela Scarparo, Romanzi del cambiamento. Scrittrici dal 1950 al 1980, Avagliano Editore, Roma 2014. On Luce d'Eramo see Introduzione and pp. 327–355 about Nucleo zero.
