= Ottobre in Poesia =

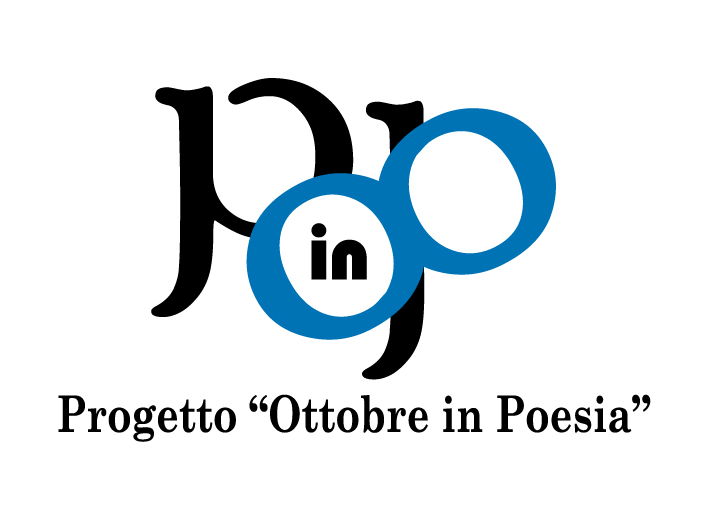
- Frequency: Annually
- Locations: Sassari, Sardinia, Italy
- Website: ottobreinpoesia.it

Ottobre in Poesia is a poetry festival held annually in the city of Sassari, Sardinia, Italy in the month of October.

The International Literary Prize of the city of Sassari takes place during the festival.

== History and events ==
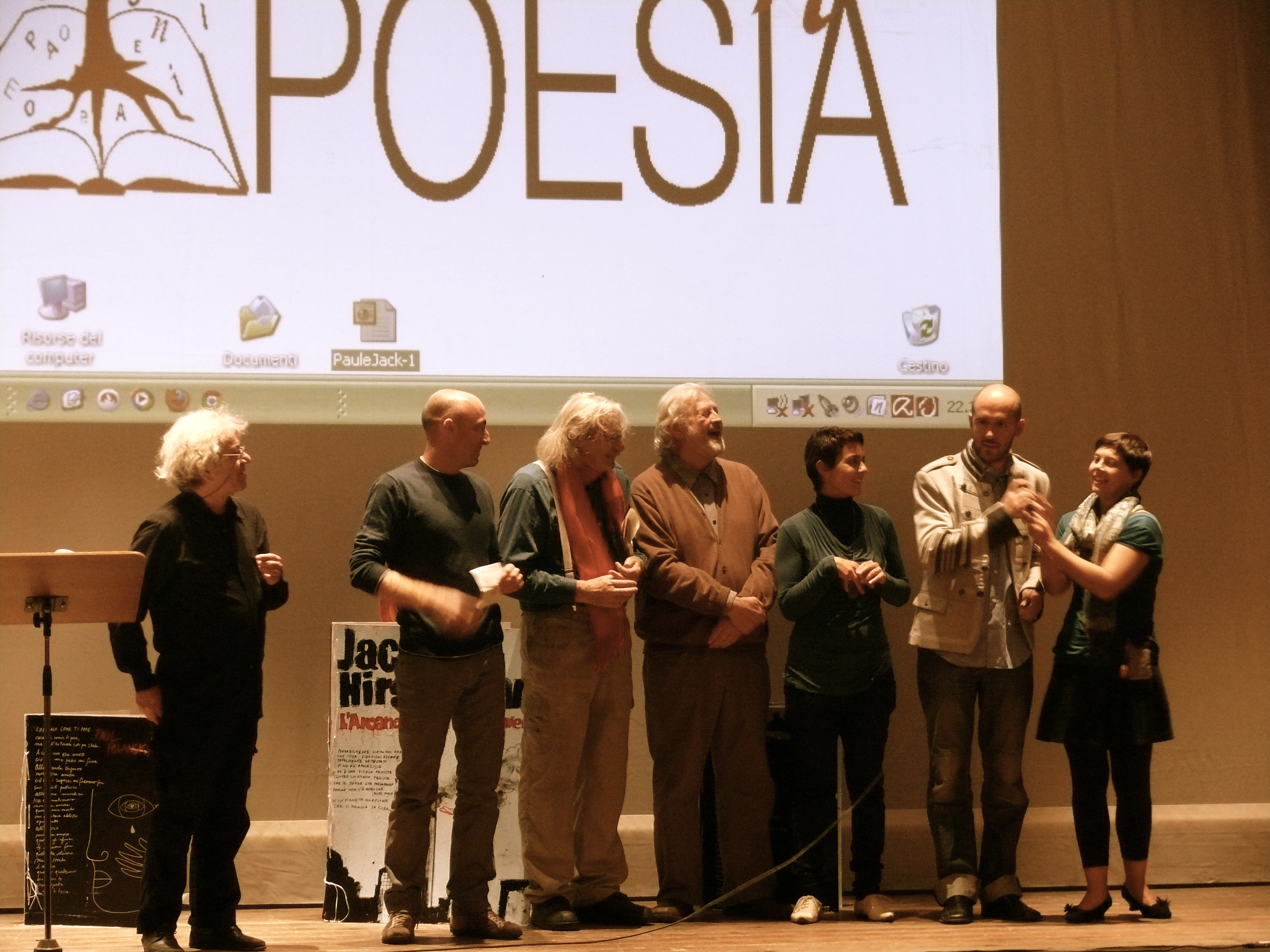
Beppe Costa, Leonardo Omar Onida, Jack Hirschman, Paul Polansky, Erika Pirodda, Luca Losito and Valeria Alzari at Civic Theater in Sassari

Ottobre in Poesia began in 2007. The Island of Verses prize was announced in 2007 and first given out during the second edition of the festival; it was renamed the International Literary Prize of the city of Sassari in 2010.

The festival includes meetings with authors, readings, performances, concerts and art installations. In more recent editions of the festival, events have taken place in nearby cities in addition to Sassari.

Contributions from each edition of the festival are compiled in a limited edition anthology.

The 2012 edition start from Carbonia: "Waiting Ottobre in Poesia" with an exhibition of works at international level directed by Shikanu', a recital and theatrical performance in schools; of a "After Festival" with a recital-shows at the Vecchio Mulino of Sassari, and meetings with schools of Alghero.

== Organizers and planners ==
The credit for the success of this initiative is due to:

- Author and artistic director: Leonardo Omar Onida;
- Editing anthology literary prize: Erika Pirodda e Valeria Alzari;
- Secretary's office literary prize: Erika Pirodda;
- Fraphics: Stefania Onida;
- Public relations: Bianca Maria Demontis;
- Press office and communication: Valentina Cei and Stefania Battistella;
- Coordination and welcoming: Valeria Alzari;
- Technical supervision: Giuseppe Sanna;
- Web and information technology: Fabrizio Spiga.

== Prize ==
The International Literary Prize of the city of Sassari is given out in four specific areas:

=== Poetry ===
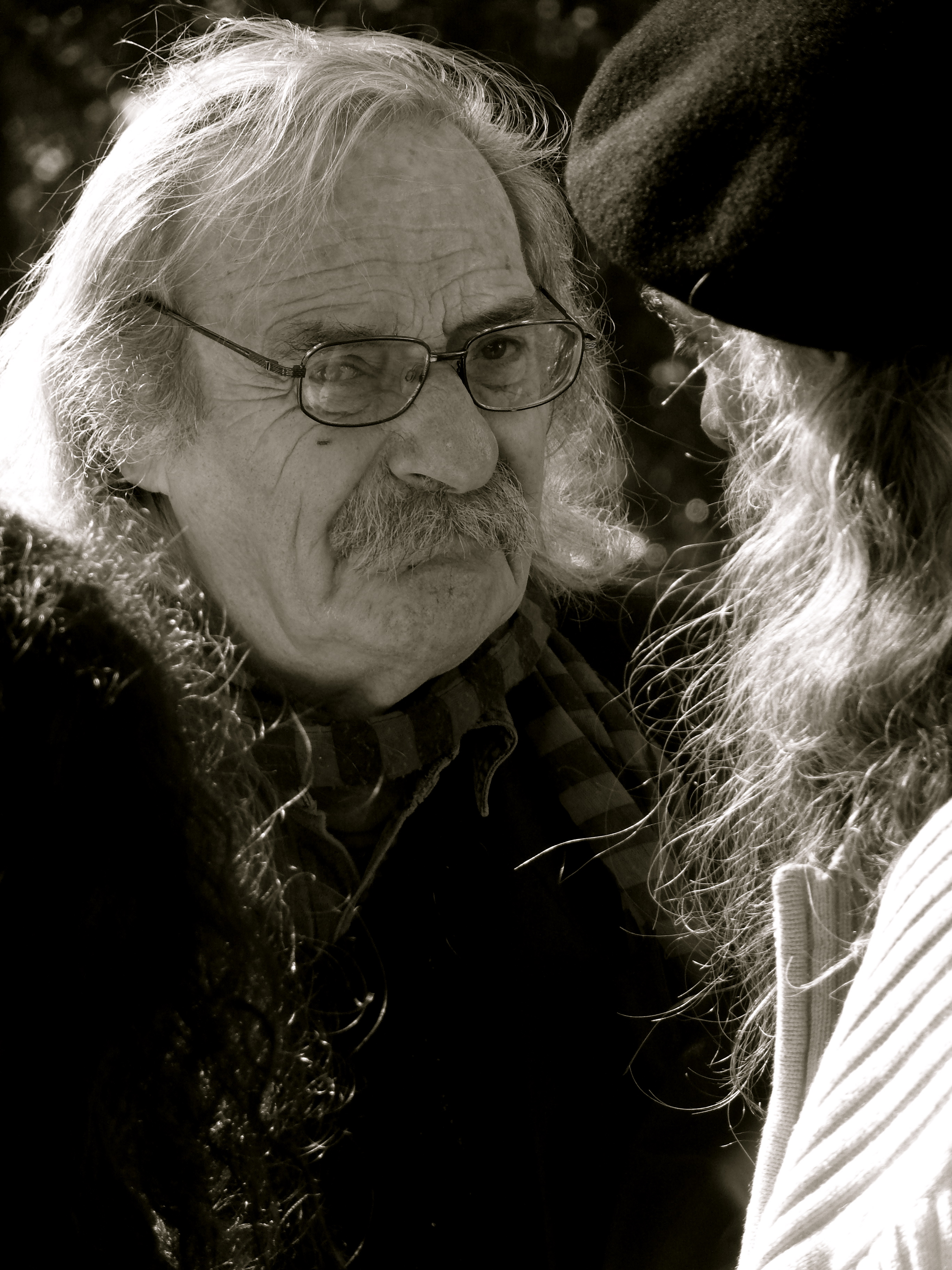
Jack Hirschman and Gabriel Impaglione at Ottobre in Poesia, October 2011

==== Island of Verses ====
includes two sections:

- published;
- unpublished – Beppe Costa Prize (only competition that dedicates his award to a living poet);
- Jury Schools Special Prize (in which students from three high schools are active);

=== Fiction ===
==== Fabula Mundi ====
includes one section:

- unpublished: short stories in free subject.

== Publications ==
- L'Isola dei Versi, anthology 2008. ISBN 97888-95975-18-4.
- Premio Letterario Internazionale Città di Sassari, anthology 2011. ISBN 97888-66183-19-8.

== Patronage ==
The importance attained by the festival in recent editions, has allowed the granting of major patronage:

- from 2010 under the patronage of Presidency of Italian Republic, Ministry of Heritage and Culture, Minister of Youth;
- from 2011 under the patronage of UNESCO – Italian National Commission for UNESCO.

In addition to previous patronage of the Autonomous Region of Sardinia, Town of Tissi and Sassari.

== Locations ==
The places where the festival takes place are very different from each other and displaced in different cities:

- Sassari: academy of music, Frumentaria, Vecchio Mulino, Patiu di lu Diaulu, Spano senior high school, Messaggerie Sarde bookshop, Nazario Sauro square, L.go Sisini, public gardens, Civic Theatre, Monserrato Park, University of Sassari;
- Alghero: Casa Parco Porto Conte;
- Tissi: public library;
- Nuoro: senior high school specializing in classical studies;
- Bosa: Casa del Popolo;
- Modolo: Parish Hall;
- Carbonia: Public Library.

== Guests ==
On the last day of the festival, guests and participants gather at the Civic Theatre in Sassari for performances (recitals, plays, etc.) by the most important guests of the festival. The festival has been attended by guests such as Silvano Agosti, Beppe Costa, Giovanna Mulas, Gabriel Impaglione, Fernando Arrabal, Jack Hirschman, Paul Polansky, Robert Minhinnick, Alex Pausides, Tino Petilli, Hernan Loyola, Jan Fortune, Desmond Egan, Andrea Garbin, Fabio Barcellandi, Stefania Battistella, it:Adele Cambria, Alessandra Celletti, Dave Lordan, Antonella Meloni Corsini. In 2013, as special guest the poet and ex Israeli ambassador to Norway Naim Araidi.

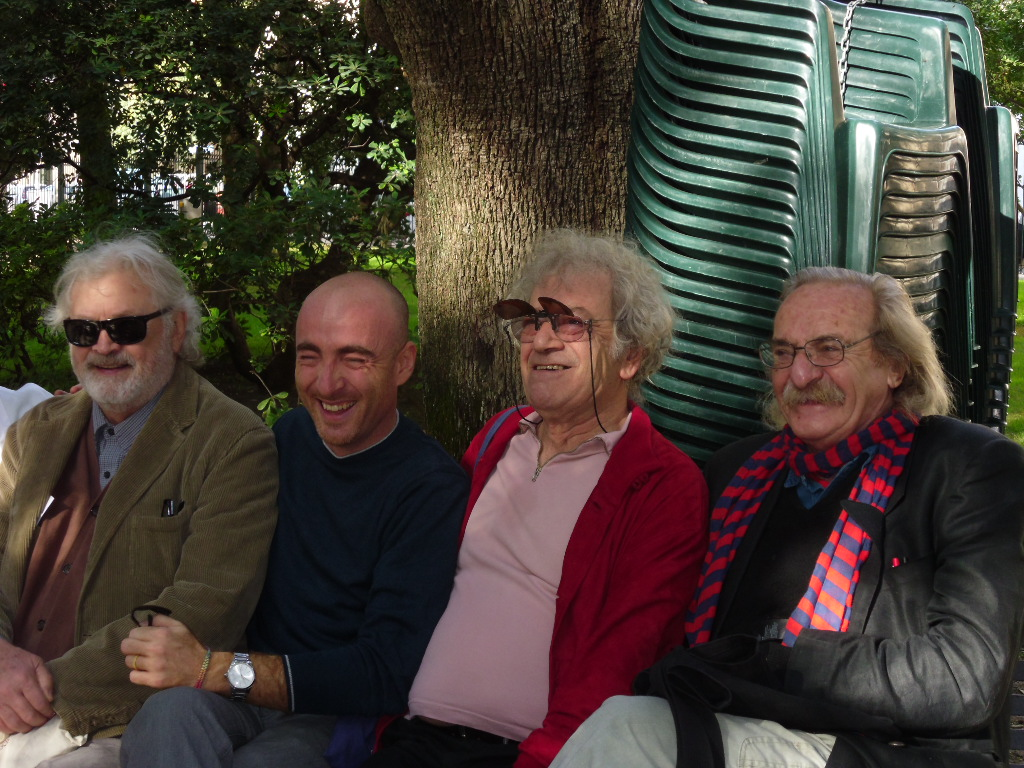
Paul Polansky, Leonardo Omar Onida, Beppe Costa and Jack Hirschman at Ottobre in Poesia, October 2011
