= Eva Lopez (singer) =

French singer

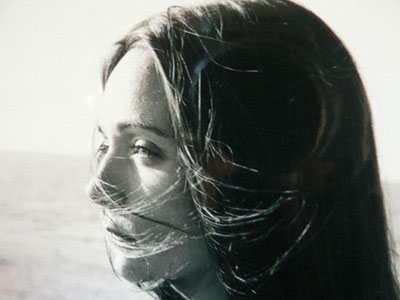

Eva Lopez is a French singer.

== Career ==
Lopez has given concerts interpreting songs by Edith Piaf, Barbara, Jacques Brel, Gilbert Bécaud, Léo Ferré, and Charles Aznavou. At the request of the French Embassy in Kosovo, she gave a recital in Pristina during the Francophonie Week.

On the 38th Europe Day, Lopez was awarded the European Personality Prize at the Protomoteca Hall of the Capitol in Rome.

In June 2022, Lopez sang "Dalida" at the Casalinuovo auditorium in Catanzaro, Italy, a "jazzy" musical creation.
