= Jack Hirschman =

American poet and social activist (1933–2021)

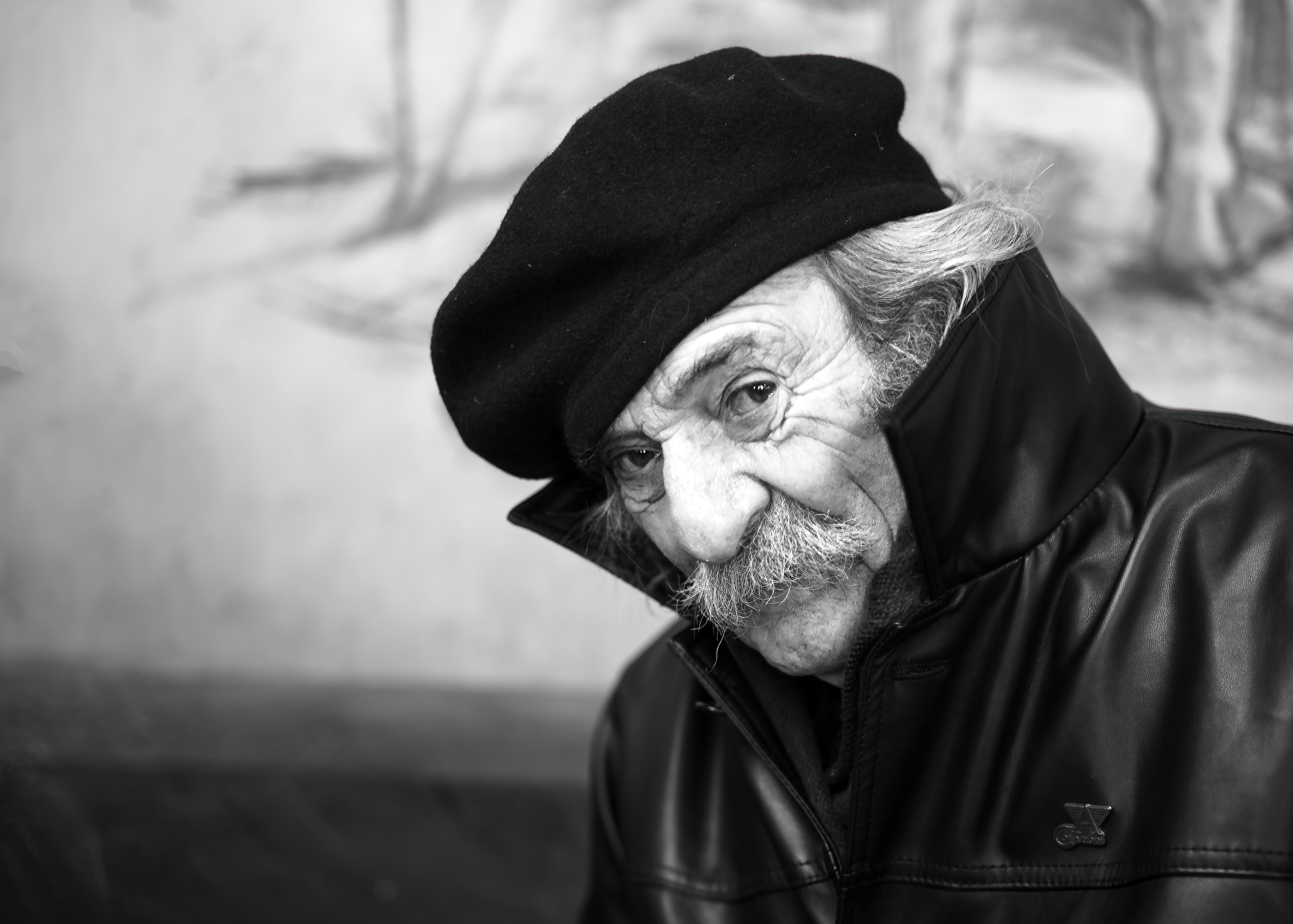
- Hirschman in November 2016
- Born: December 13, 1933; New York City, U.S.
- Died: August 22, 2021 (aged 87); San Francisco, California, U.S.
- Education: City College of New York (BA); Indiana University Bloomington (MA, PhD)
- Occupations: Poet, writer, essayist, social activist
- Spouse(s): Ruth Epstein (divorced) Agneta Falk (m. 1999)
- Children: 2
- Writing career
- Period: 1953–2021

Jack Hirschman (December 13, 1933 – August 22, 2021) was an American poet and social activist who wrote more than 100 volumes of poetry and essays.

== Early life and education ==
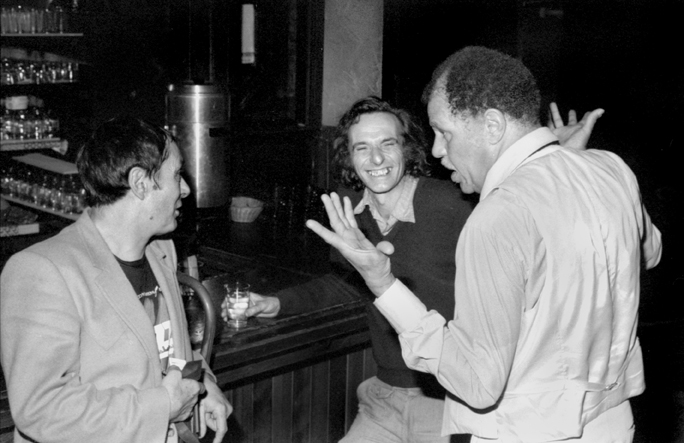
Saxophonists Art Pepper (left) and Dexter Gordon (right) chat with North Beach poet Jack Hirschman (center) at Keystone Korner in San Francisco, in October 1981

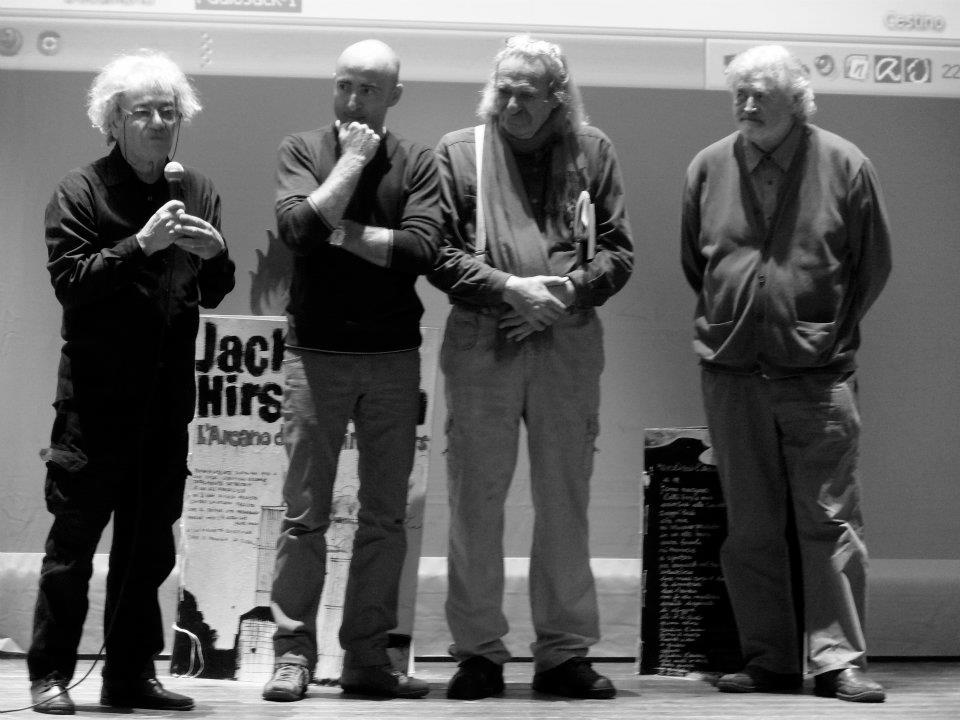
Beppe Costa with Leonardo Omar Onida, Hirschman, and Paul Polansky in civic Theatre during the Ottobre in poesia festival in Sassari, Italy, in 2011

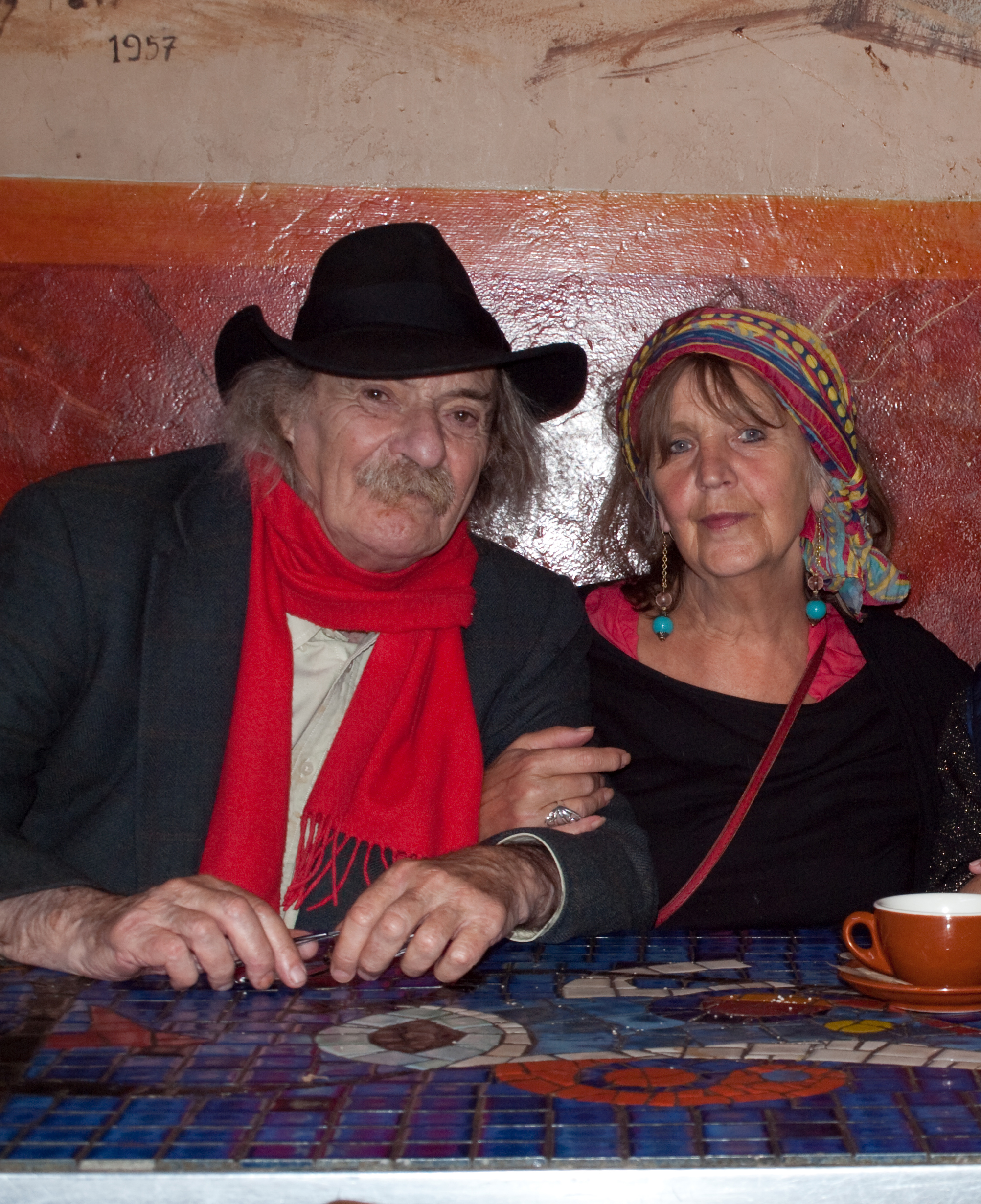
Hirschman and Agneta Falk at Caffe Trieste in July 2013

Hirschman was born on December 13, 1933, in New York City, into a Russian Jewish family. He received a Bachelor of Arts from the City College of New York in 1955, a Master of Arts in 1957, and Doctor of Philosophy in 1960 from Indiana University Bloomington, Indiana. While attending City College, he worked as a copy boy for the Associated Press.

== Career ==
At 19 years old, Hirschman sent a story to Ernest Hemingway, who responded: "I can't help you, kid. You write better than I did when I was 19. But the hell of it is, you write like me. That is no sin. But you won't get anywhere with it." Hirschman left a copy of the letter with the Associated Press, and when Hemingway killed himself in 1961, the "Letter to a Young Writer" was distributed by the wire service and published all over the world.

In the 1950s and 1960s, Hirschman taught at Dartmouth College and the University of California, Los Angeles. During his tenure at UCLA, one of the students enrolled in his class was Jim Morrison, later to be a cofounder and lead vocalist of the American band The Doors. The Vietnam War, however, put an end to Hirschman's academic career; he was fired from UCLA after encouraging his students to resist the draft. His marriage disintegrated, and he moved to San Francisco in 1973.

For a quarter century, Hirschman roamed San Francisco streets, cafes (including Caffe Trieste, where he was a regular patron), and readings, becoming an active street poet and a peripatetic activist. Hirschman was also a painter and collagist.

A fellow San Francisco writer that Hirschman greatly admired was Kenneth Rexroth. Hirschman told American Legends website: "Rexroth was a magnificent poet. In a real sense, he was the father of all these guys. He was the man who wrote the first major political poem after the Second World War, outside of the communists who were writing poems against McCarthyism published in newspapers. Rexroth's poem, on the death of Dylan Thomas, was one of the great lyrical poems by a North American poet. People in other countries know that Kenneth Rexroth was the father of the Beats, and, if you ask Lawrence Ferlinghetti, he'll tell you, too."

== Death ==
Hirschman died from coronavirus-related causes at his home in San Francisco, on August 22, 2021, at the age of 87. He was remembered by the San Francisco Chronicle as, "a scholar and translator in nine languages who threw over a career as a college professor for the life of a proletarian North Beach poet."

=== Poetry ===
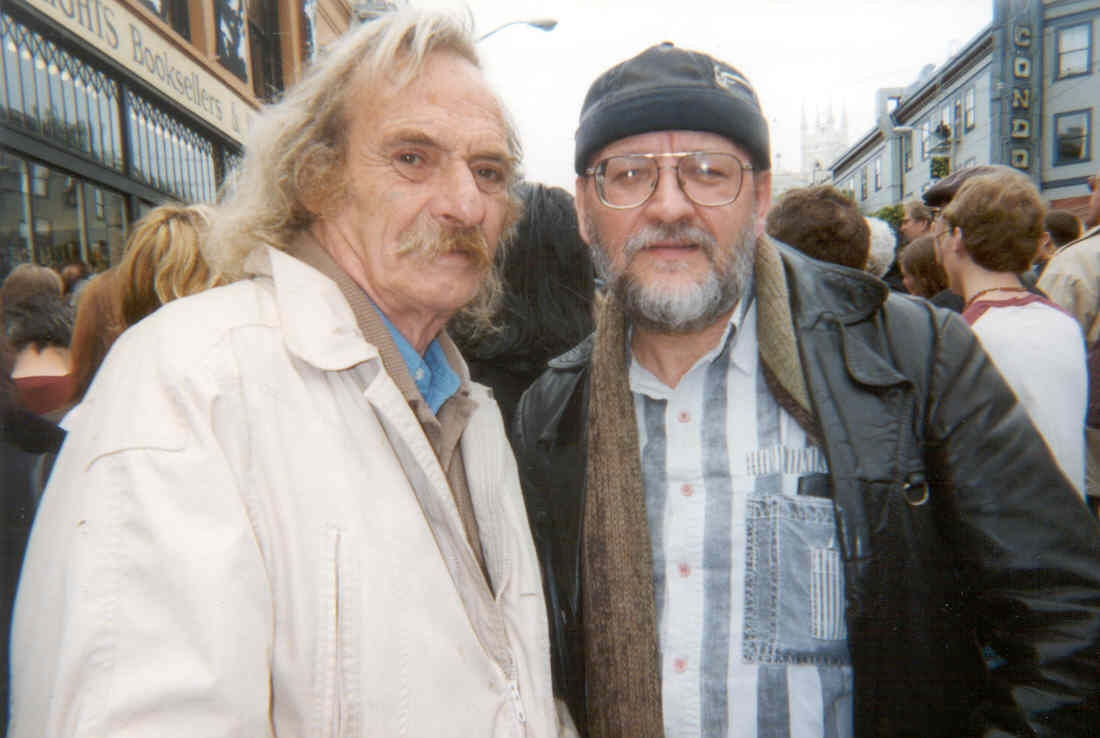
Hirschman with Polish American translator Janusz Zalewski at City Lights Bookstore Beats Festival in San Francisco in 2007

His first volume of poetry, A Correspondence of Americans, published in 1960 by Indiana University Press, included an introduction by Karl Shapiro: "What a relief to find a poet who is not afraid of the vulgar or the sentimental, who can burst out laughing or cry his head off in poetry – who can make love to language, or kick it in the pants." Among his many volumes of poetry are A Correspondence of Americans (Indiana University Press, 1960), Black Alephs (Trigram Press, 1969), Lyripol (City Lights, 1976), The Bottom Line (Curbstone, 1988), and Endless Threshold (Curbstone, 1992). He also translated over two dozen books into English from languages including Hebrew, German, French, Spanish, Italian, Persian, Russian, Albanian, and Greek.

In 2006, Hirschman released his most extensive collection of poems yet, The Arcanes. Published in Salerno, Italy by Multimedia Edizioni, The Arcanes comprises 126 long poems spanning 34 years.

Also in 2006, Hirschman was appointed Poet Laureate of San Francisco by Mayor Gavin Newsom. In his Poet Laureate inaugural address, Hirschman envisioned creating an International Poetry Festival in San Francisco, reprising a great tradition from the city's literary past.

In July 2007, Friends of the San Francisco Public Library, Mayor Gavin Newsom, Hirschman, and the San Francisco Public Library presented their first San Francisco International Poetry Festival.

Hirschman was named Poet-in-Residence with Friends of the San Francisco Public Library in 2009. Hirschman continued his work supporting the literary community and was the key organizer for the now biennial San Francisco International Poetry Festival.

From 2007 Festival on, Hirschman, in partnership with Friends of the San Francisco Public Library and the San Francisco Public Library, have presented smaller poetry festivals in a variety of languages, including the Latino Poetry Festival, the Vietnamese Poetry Festival, and the Iranian Arts Poetry Festival.

Hirschman curated the Poets 11 Anthology, which collected poetry from each of the city's 11 districts.

Hirschman was a long time mentor to author and actress Amber Tamblyn.

== Political views ==
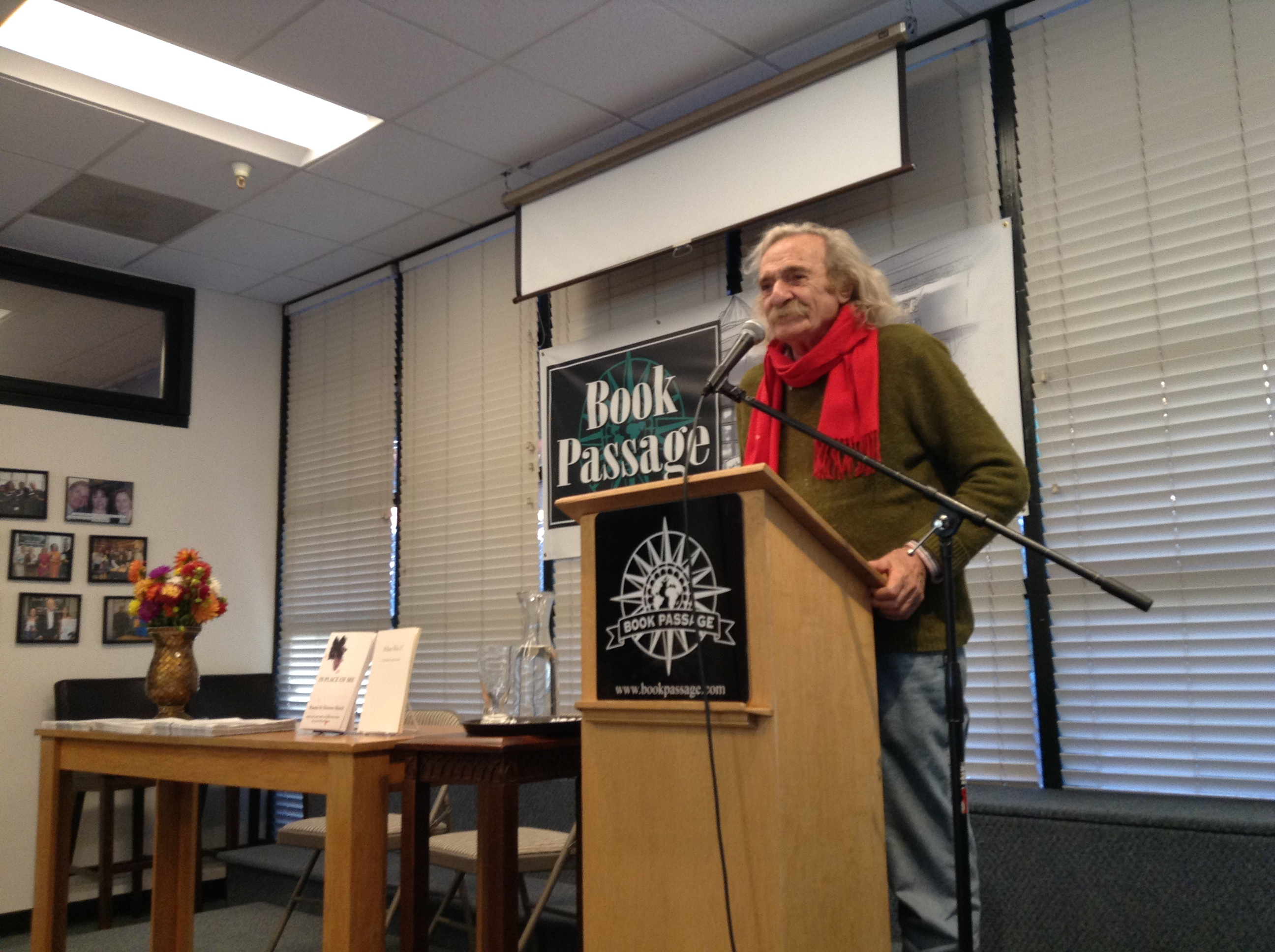
Hirschman speaking at Book Passage in Marin County, California

Hirschman supported the anti-war movement, the Black Panther Party, and advocated for the rights of homeless people.

According to a 2006 book review, Hirschman was a Stalinist. Hirschman translated the youthful poems of Joseph Stalin into English (Joey: The Poems of Joseph Stalin; Deliriodendron Press, 2001). He was an assistant editor at the left-wing literary journal Left Curve and was a correspondent for The People's Tribune. He was active with the Revolutionary Poets Brigade. Hirschman is profiled in the 2009 documentary Red Poet in which he identifies as a Marxist-Leninist. He stated in an interview with the San Francisco Chronicle, “The most important thing as a poet is that I worked for the Communist movement for 45 years, and the new class of impoverished and homeless people.”

== Personal life ==
In 1954, Hirschman married Ruth Epstein, whom he'd met and dated when they were students at CCNY. Following graduation, Ruth became a program director for KPFK and eventually general manager of Santa Monica public radio station KCRW. The couple had two children, David and Celia, before divorcing in 1973. His son, David, died of lymphoma in 1982, at age 25. His daughter Celia Hirschman is a music business consultant and is the host of the "On the Beat" program on KCRW.

== Selected works ==
=== Collections ===
- A Correspondence of Americans Indiana University Press, 1960
- (With Franz Kline) Kline Sky, The Zora Gallery, 1965
- Yod, Trigram Press, 1966
- Black Alephs: Poems, 1960-1968, Phoenix Bookshop, 1969
- HNYC, R. Tamblyn Skyline Press, 1971
- The Burning of Los Angeles, J'Ose Press, 1971
- Endless Threshold, Curbstone Press, 1992 ISBN 9781880684009
- Front Lines, City Lights Publishers, 2002 ISBN 9780872864009
- Only Dreaming Sky, Manic D Press, 2007 ISBN 9781933149134
- All That's Left, City Lights Publishers, 2008 ISBN 9781931404082
- The Ulitsea Arcane, Nicola Viviani Edizioni, 2012
- Talking Leaves, Sore Dove Press, 2013
- Passion, Provocation and Prophecy, Swimming with Elephants Publications, 2015
- The Arcanes : 2006-2016 Multimedia Edizioni, 2016 ISBN 9788886203456

=== Editor ===
- Revolutionary Poets Brigade (Volume 1) Caza de Poesía, 2010 ISBN 9781936293254
- Poets 11 Anthology 2012 Friends of the San Francisco Public Library, 2016 ISBN 9781482331295
- (with Falk, Agneta) Heartfire: 2nd Revolutionary Poets Brigade anthology Kallatumba Press, 2013 ISBN 9780578127354
- (with Curl, John) Overthrowing capitalism : a symposium of poets Kallatumba Press, 2014 ISBN 9781502304520
- (with Curl, John) Overthrowing capitalism. Volume two, Beyond endless war, racist police, sexist elites Kallatumba Press, 2015 ISBN 9781517596507
- (with Curl, John) Overthrowing capitalism. Volume three, Reclaiming community Kallatumba Press, 2016 ISBN 9781537516790
- Poets 11 Anthology 2016 Friends of the San Francisco Public Library, 2016 ISBN 9781537374604
- (with Curl, John and Falk, Agneta) Overthrowing capitalism. Volume four Kallatumba Press, 2017 ISBN 9781977685384
- (with Curl, John) Building Socialism: World Multilingual Poetry from the Revolutionary Poets Brigade Homeward Press, 2020 ISBN 9780938392149
- (with Curl, John) Building Socialism, Volume 2 - Fighting Fascism Homeward Press, 2021 ISBN 9780938392156

=== Translator ===
- Artaud, Antonin Antonin Artaud anthology City Lights Publishers, 1965 ISBN 9780872860001
- (with Victor Erlich) Mayakovsky, Vladimir Electric Iron Maya Books, 1971
- Dalton, Roque, Poemas Clandestinos Clandestine Poems Solidarity Publications, 1984 ISBN 9780942638073
- (with Mark Eisner, John Felstiner, Forrest Gander, Robert Hass, Stephen Kessler, Stephen Mitchell, and Alastair Reid) Neruda, Pablo, The Essential Neruda City Lights Publishers, 2004 ISBN 9780872864283
- Pasolini, Pier Pablo, In Danger : a Pasolini anthology City Lights Publishers, 2010 ISBN 9780872865075
- Sénac, Jean, Citizens of Beauty : Poems of Jean Sénac Michigan State University Press, 2016 ISBN 9781609174859
