= Irish Book Awards =

Irish annual literary awards

The Irish Book Awards are Irish literary awards, primarily for books in various categories; one book is chosen as overall book of the year, and there are also prizes for creators, including a prize for the author or illustrator of the year. Additionally, there are awards for poetry, short story writing and bookshops.

The Irish Book Awards are the only set of literary awards supported by all Irish bookstores, and are operated as a non-profit project; since 2018, the primary sponsor of the awards and their presentation event, is An Post, Ireland's state-owned postal service. Specific organisations sponsor some individual awards, including bookshop chains, media outlets and the Library Association of Ireland.

== History ==
First awarded in 2006, the Irish Book Awards grew out of the Irish Novel of the Year Prize, operated by the Hughes and Hughes bookshop and wholesale chain and inaugurated in 2003. Since 2007 the Awards have been conducted by an independent not-for-profit company, funded by sponsorship. Bord Gáis Energy sponsored the awards from 2012 until 2018, when An Post took over sponsorship.

The Awards Dinner has been attended by Taoisigh and Presidents of Ireland.

== Management ==
The operation of the awards and dinner is overseen by a five-member board, with an executive director, and there is an extended advisory board where these five are joined by publisher and partner representatives.

== Description ==
As of 2026, there are 21 literary awards. Most are for books in various classes, including three for books for children and young adults, while one is for new poetry and one for new short stories, one for an author or illustrator and one is the overall Book of the Year Award. All of these are for work published in the year ending November of the nominal year. There is also a lifetime achievement award, presented for a body of work.

There is also the Bookshop of the Year Award, taking in the whole island, and specifically sponsored by An Post. This has been won by Kennys of Galway, Bridge Street Books of Wicklow, Halfway Up the Stairs of Greystones, Little Acorns of Derry, and Chapters of Dublin.

=== Current Awards ===
==== Books of the Year ====
- Novel of the Year
- Leabhar Ficsin Gaeilge na Bliana
- Children's Book of the Year, Junior
- Children's Book of the Year, Senior
- Teen & Young Adult Book of the Year
- Crime Fiction Book of the Year
- Popular Fiction Book of the Year
- Non-Fiction Book of the Year
- History Book of the Year
- Biography of the Year
- Sports Book of the Year
- Lifestyle Book of the Year
- Irish Language Book of the Year
- Best Irish-published Book of the Year
- The Last Word Listeners' Choice Award (until 2021, the RTÉ Audience/Listeners' Choice Award)
- Newcomer of the Year

==== Author / illustrator awards ====
- Author / Illustrator of the Year (a Library Association of Ireland award)*
- Lifetime Achievement Award*

==== Other awards ====
- New Irish Writing: Short Story of the Year*
- New Irish Writing: Poem of the Year*
- Bookshop of the Year*

Asterisked items have different voting provisions compared to the main body of awards.

=== Previous awards ===
- Popular Non-Fiction Book of the Year (last awarded 2020)
- International Recognition Award (last awarded 2020)
- Cookbook of the Year
- New Voices: The An Post Writing Prize*

=== An Post Irish Book of the Year ===
Since 2011, one of the award-winning books has been selected as the overall Irish Book of the Year.

== Selection process ==
The awards have a hybrid judging and voting process, working in three strands.

For most of the awards, a panel selects the shortlists, which are then submitted for public voting. For three specialised ones, a special panel is convened for each. And for the Irish Book of the Year, an overall judging panel chooses from a short-shortlist.

For the Irish Bookshop of the Year Award, a separate voting process applies, with public voting on a shortlist on the sponsor's website, closing in September.

== Winners by year ==
Book of the Year winners are indicated with a blue ribbon.

=== 2003–2005 (Hughes & Hughes Award / Irish Novel) ===
Inaugurated in 2000 by Hughes & Hughes, the Hughes & Hughes Award ran until 2005 when it merged with the Irish Book Awards and became the Irish Novel category.

- 2003: That They May Face the Rising Sun by John McGahern
- 2004: Dancer by Colum McCann
- 2005: Havoc in its Third Year by Ronan Bennett

=== 2006 ===
Award	Winner
Novel of the Year	The Sea by John Banville
Non-Fiction Book of the Year	In the Dark Room by Brian Dillon
Children's Book of the Year	The New Policeman by Kate Thompson

In subsequent years the Children's Book category was split into two award categories; Junior and Senior.

=== 2007 ===
Award	Winner
Novel of the Year	Winterwood by Patrick McCabe
Best Irish Published Book of the Year	Lifelines: New and Collected by Niall McMonagle (ed.)
Non-Fiction Book of the Year	Connemara: Listening to the Wind by Tim Robinson
Popular Fiction Book of the Year	Should Have Got Off at Sydney Parade by Ross O'Carroll-Kelly
Children's Book of the Year, Junior	The Incredible Book Eating Boy by Oliver Jeffers
Children's Book of the Year, Senior	The Boy in the Striped Pyjamas by John Boyne
Sports Book of the Year	Back from the Brink by Paul McGrath
Newcomer of the Year	The Goddess Guide by Gisele Scanlan
RTÉ Audience Choice Award	The Boy in the Striped Pyjamas by John Boyne
Lifetime Achievement Award	John McGahern

=== 2008 ===
Award	Winner
Novel of the Year	The Gathering by Anne Enright
Best Irish Published Book of the Year	Judging Dev by Diarmaid Ferriter
Non-Fiction Book of the Year	Judging Dev by Diarmaid Ferriter
Popular Fiction Book of the Year	Take A Look at Me Now by Anita Notaro
Children's Book of the Year, Junior	The Story of Ireland by Brendan O'Brien
Children's Book of the Year, Senior	Wilderness by Roddy Doyle
Sports Book of the Year	Trevor Brennan: Heart and Soul by Trevor Brennan with Gerry Thornley
Newcomer of the Year	With My Lazy Eye by Julia Kelly
RTÉ Audience Choice Award	Judging Dev by Diarmaid Ferriter
Lifetime Achievement Award	William Trevor

=== 2009 ===
Award	Winner
Novel of the Year	The Secret Scripture by Sebastian Barry
Crime Fiction Book of the Year	Blood Runs Cold by Alex Barclay
Best Irish Published Book of the Year	The Parish by Alice Taylor
Non-Fiction Book of the Year	Stepping Stones by Seamus Heaney and Dennis O'Driscoll
Popular Fiction Book of the Year	This Charming Man by Marian Keyes
Children's Book of the Year, Junior	Before You Sleep by Benji Bennett
Children's Book of the Year, Senior	Skulduggery Pleasant: Playing With Fire by Derek Landy
Sports Book of the Year	Ronan O'Gara, My Autobiography by Ronan O'Gara
Newcomer of the Year	Confessions of a Fallen Angel by Ronan O'Brien
RTÉ Audience Choice Award	The Secret Scripture by Sebastian Barry
Lifetime Achievement Award	Edna O'Brien

=== 2010 ===
Award	Winner
Novel of the Year	Room by Emma Donoghue
Crime Fiction Book of the Year	Dark Times in the City by Gene Kerrigan
Best Irish Published Book of the Year	Good Mood Food by Donal Skehan
Non-Fiction Book of the Year	A Coward If I Return, a Hero If I Fall by Neil Richardson
Popular Fiction Book of the Year	The Oh My God Delusion by Ross O'Carroll-Kelly
Children's Book of the Year, Junior	On the Road with Mavis and Marge by Niamh Sharkey
Children's Book of the Year, Senior	Skulduggery Pleasant: Mortal Coil by Derek Landy
Sports Book of the Year	A Football Man: My Autobiography by John Giles
Newcomer of the Year	JFK in Ireland: Four Days That Changed a President by Ryan Tubridy
RTÉ Audience Choice Award	Come What May: The Autobiography by Donal Óg Cusack
Lifetime Achievement Award	Maeve Binchy

=== 2011 ===
Award	Winner
Novel of the Year	Mistaken by Neil Jordan
Crime Fiction Book of the Year	Bloodland by Alan Glynn
Best Irish Published Book of the Year	Connemara: A Little Gaelic Kingdom by Tim Robinson
Non-Fiction Book of the Year	Easy Meals by Rachel Allen
Popular Fiction Book of the Year	All For You by Sheila O'Flanagan
Children's Book of the Year, Junior	The Lonely Beast by Chris Judge
Children's Book of the Year, Senior	The Real Rebecca by Anna Carey
Sports Book of the Year	Inside the Peloton by Nicolas Roche
Newcomer of the Year	Solace by Belinda McKeon
RTÉ Audience Choice Award	How to be a Woman by Caitlin Moran
Bookshop of the Year	Crannóg Bookshop, Cavan Town
Lifetime Achievement Award	Seamus Heaney

=== 2012 ===
Award	Winner
Novel of the Year	Ancient Light by John Banville
Crime Fiction Book of the Year	Broken Harbour by Tana French
Best Irish Published Book of the Year	Atlas of the Great Irish Famine by John Crowley, William J. Smyth and Mike Murphy
Non-Fiction Book of the Year	Country Girl by Edna O’Brien
Cookbook of the Year	Eat Like an Italian by Catherine Fulvio
Popular Fiction Book of the Year	A Week in Winter by Maeve Binchy
Children's Book of the Year, Junior	This Moose Belongs to Me by Oliver Jeffers
Children's Book of the Year, Senior	Artemis Fowl and the Last Guardian by Eoin Colfer
Sports Book of the Year	My Olympic Dream by Katie Taylor
Newcomer of the Year	The Spinning Heart by Donal Ryan
RTÉ Audience Choice Award	Just Mary: My Memoir by Mary O'Rourke
Bookshop of the Year	Bridge Street Books, Wicklow Town
Lifetime Achievement Award	Jennifer Johnston

=== 2013 ===
Award	Winner
Novel of the Year	The Guts by Roddy Doyle
Crime Fiction Book of the Year	The Doll's House by Louise Phillips
Best Irish Published Book of the Year	A History of Ireland in 100 Objects by Fintan O'Toole
Non-Fiction Book of the Year	Staring at Lakes by Michael Harding
Cookbook of the Year	30 Years of Ballymaloe by Darina Allen
Popular Fiction Book of the Year	Downturn Abbey by Ross O'Carroll-Kelly
Children's Book of the Year, Junior	When You Were Born by Benji Bennett
Children's Book of the Year, Senior	Last Stand of Dead Men by Derek Landy
Sports Book of the Year	Seven Deadly Sins by David Walsh
Newcomer of the Year	The Herbalist by Niamh Boyce
RTÉ Audience Choice Award	Staring at Lakes by Michael Harding
Short Story of the Year	The Things We Lose The Things We Leave Behind by Billy O'Callaghan
Bookshop of the Year	The Clifden Bookshop, Clifden, County Galway
Lifetime Achievement Award	John Banville

=== 2014 ===
The 2014 awards were presented on 26 November at the DoubleTree by Hilton Hotel in Dublin.

Award	Winner
Novel of the Year	Academy St by Mary Costello
Crime Fiction Book of the Year	Unravelling Oliver by Liz Nugent
Best Irish Published Book of the Year	Dubliners 100 by Thomas Morris
Non-Fiction Book of the Year	The Life and Loves of a He Devil by Graham Norton
Cookbook of the Year	The Nation’s Favourite Food Fast by Neven Maguire
Popular Fiction Book of the Year	The Year I Met You by Cecelia Ahern
Children's Book of the Year, Junior	Shh! We Have a Plan by Chris Haughton
Children's Book of the Year, Senior	Moone Boy by Chris O'Dowd and Nick Vincent Murphy
Sports Book of the Year	The Test by Brian O'Driscoll
Newcomer of the Year	Only Ever Yours by Louise O'Neill
RTÉ Audience Choice Award	It’s All in the Head by Majella O'Donnell
Short Story of the Year	Rest Day by John Boyne
International Recognition Award	Jeffery Archer
Lifetime Achievement Award	Paul Durcan

=== 2015 ===
The 2015 awards were presented on 25 November at the DoubleTree by Hilton Hotel in Dublin.

Award	Winner
Novel of the Year	The Green Road by Anne Enright
Crime Fiction Book of the Year	After the Fire by Jane Casey
Best Irish Published Book of the Year	The Long Gaze Back: An Anthology of Irish Women Writers by Sinéad Gleeson
Non-Fiction Book of the Year	Children of the Rising by Joe Duffy
Cookbook of the Year	The Virtuous Tart by Susan Jane White
Popular Fiction Book of the Year	The Way We Were by Sinead Moriarty
Popular Non-Fiction Book of the Year	Me and My Mate Jeffrey by Niall Breslin
Children's Book of the Year, Junior	Imaginary Fred by Eoin Colfer and Oliver Jeffers
Children's Book of the Year, Senior	Asking For It by Louise O'Neill
Sports Book of the Year	Until Victory Always: A Memoir by Jim McGuinness
Newcomer of the Year	Spill Simmer Falter Wither by Sara Baume
RTÉ Audience Choice Award	Irelandopedia by Fatti Burke and John Burke
Short Story of the Year	A Slanting of the Sun by Donal Ryan
International Recognition Award	Bill Bryson
Lifetime Achievement Award	J. P. Donleavy

=== 2016 ===
The 2016 awards sponsored by Bord Gáis Energy were presented on 16 November at the DoubleTree by Hilton Hotel in Dublin. The awards ceremony was presented by Keelin Shanley.

On 14 December, Solar Bones by Mike McCormack was named as Ireland's best book of 2016. It was chosen by a public vote from the list of category winners below.

Award	Winner
Novel of the Year	Solar Bones by Mike McCormack
Crime Fiction Book of the Year	The Trespasser by Tana French
Best Irish Published Book of the Year	The Glass Shore by Sinéad Gleeson
Non-Fiction Book of the Year	I Read The News Today, Oh Boy by Paul Howard
Cookbook of the Year	The World of The Happy Pear by Stephen Flynn and David Flynn
Popular Fiction Book of the Year	Holding by Graham Norton
Popular Non-Fiction Book of the Year	Making It Up As I Go Along by Marian Keyes
Children's Book of the Year, Junior	Pigín of Howth by Kathleen Watkins
Children's Book of the Year, Senior	Knights of the Borrowed Dark by Dave Rudden
Sports Book of the Year	The Battle by Paul O'Connell
Newcomer of the Year	Red Dirt by E. M. Reapy
RTÉ Audience Choice Award	Lying in Wait by Liz Nugent
Short Story of the Year	The Visit by Orla McAlinden
Poem of the Year	In Glasnevin by Jane Clarke
International Recognition Award	Jilly Cooper
Lifetime Achievement Award	John Montague

=== 2017 ===
The 2017 awards sponsored by Bord Gáis Energy were presented on 28 November at the Clayton Hotel in Dublin. The awards ceremony was presented by RTÉ's Keelin Shanley and Evelyn O'Rourke.

Award	Winner
Novel of the Year	Midwinter Break by Bernard MacLaverty
Crime Fiction Book of the Year	The Therapy House by Julie Parsons
Best Irish Published Book of the Year	Atlas of the Irish Revolution by John Crowley, Donál Ó Drisceoil, Mike Murphy and John Borgonovo
Non-Fiction Book of the Year	Wounds: A Memoir of War & Love by Fergal Keane
Cookbook of the Year	Cook Well, Eat Well by Rory O’Connell
Popular Fiction Book of the Year	The Break by Marian Keyes
Popular Non-Fiction Book of the Year	Motherfoclóir by Darach Ó Séaghdha
Children's Book of the Year, Junior	A Sailor Went to Sea, Sea, Sea – Favourite Rhymes from an Irish Childhood by Sarah Webb, illustrated by Steve McCarthy
Children's Book of the Year, Senior	Stand by Me by Judi Curtin
Teen & Young Adult Book of the Year	Tangleweed and Brine by Deirdre Sullivan illustrated by Karen Vaughan
Sports Book of the Year	The Choice by Philly McMahon with Niall Kelly
Newcomer of the Year	I Found my Tribe by Ruth Fitzmaurice
RTÉ Audience Choice Award	He: A Novel by John Connolly
Short Story of the Year	Back to Bones by Christine Dwyer Hickey
Poem of the Year	Seven Sugar Cubes by Clodagh Beresford Dunne
International Recognition Award	David Walliams
Lifetime Achievement Award	Eavan Boland

=== 2018 ===
The 2018 awards sponsored by An Post were presented on 27 November at the Clayton Hotel in Dublin. The awards ceremony was presented by RTÉ's Keelin Shanley while each winning author was interviewed Evelyn O'Rourke.

Notes to Self by Emilie Pine was voted the An Post Irish Book of the Year for 2018.

Award	Winner
Novel of the Year	Normal People by Sally Rooney
Crime Fiction Book of the Year	Skin Deep by Liz Nugent
Best Irish Published Book of the Year	Lighthouses of Ireland by Roger O'Reilly
Non-Fiction Book of the Year	People Like Me by Lynn Ruane
Cookbook of the Year	Currabinny Cookbook by James Kavanagh and William Murray
Popular Fiction Book of the Year	The Importance of Being Aisling by Emer McLysaght and Sarah Breen
Popular Non-Fiction Book of the Year	The Cow Book by John Connell
Children's Book of the Year, Junior	The President's Cat by Peter Donnelly
Children's Book of the Year, Senior	Blazing a Trail by Sarah Webb and Lauren O'Neill
Teen & Young Adult Book of the Year	The Weight of a Thousand Feathers by Brian Conaghan
Sports Book of the Year	Game Changer by Cora Staunton with Mary White
Newcomer of the Year	Notes to Self by Emilie Pine
Irish Language Book of the Year	Tuatha De Denann by Diarmuid Johnson
RTÉ Audience Choice Award	Skin Deep by Liz Nugent
Short Story of the Year	How to Build a Space Rocket by Roisin O'Donnell
Poem of the Year	Birthday by Brian Kirk
Lifetime Achievement Award	Thomas Kinsella

=== 2019 ===
The 2019 awards ceremony was held in Dublin on 20 November 2019. The event was hosted by Miriam O'Callaghan and Evelyn O'Rourke. Over 115,000 votes were cast by readers to select the winners in each category.

The winner of the An Post Irish Book of the Year was Overcoming by Vicky Phelan and Naomi Linehan.

Award	Winner
Novel of the Year	Shadowplay by Joseph O'Connor
Crime Fiction Book of the Year	Cruel Acts by Jane Casey
Best Irish Published Book of the Year	Children of the Troubles by Joe Duffy & Freya McClements
Non-Fiction Book of the Year	Constellations by Sinéad Gleeson
Cookbook of the Year	Cornucopia: The Green Cookbook by Tony Keogh, Aoife Carrigy, the Chefs of Cornucopia, Deirdre and Dairine McCafferty
Popular Fiction Book of the Year	Once, Twice, Three Times an Aisling by Emer McLysaght and Sarah Breen
Popular Non-Fiction Book of the Year	Barefoot Pilgrimage by Andrea Corr
Children's Book of the Year, Junior	123 Ireland! by Aoife Dooley
Children's Book of the Year, Senior	Shooting for the Stars – My Journey to Become Ireland's First Astronaut by Norah Patten, illustrated by Jennifer Farley
Teen & Young Adult Book of the Year	Other Words for Smoke by Sarah Maria Griffin
Sports Book of the Year	Recovering by Richie Sadlier with Dion Fanning
Newcomer of the Year	When All is Said by Anne Griffin
Irish Language Book of the Year	Tairngreacht by Prionsias Mac a'Bhaird
RTÉ Audience Choice Award	Overcoming by Vicky Phelan with Naomi Linehan
Short Story of the Year	Parrot by Nicole Flattery
Poem of the Year	Salt Rain by Audrey Molloy
International Recognition Award	George R. R. Martin
Lifetime Achievement Award	Colm Tóibín

=== 2020 ===
The 2020 awards ceremony was held virtually on 25 November 2020. A record number of votes were cast by the Irish public to select the winners in each category.

A Ghost in the Throat by Doireann Ní Ghríofa was announced as Irish Book of the Year in December 2020.

Award	Winner
Novel of the Year	Strange Flowers by Donal Ryan
Crime Fiction Book of the Year	After the Silence by Louise O'Neill
Best Irish Published Book of the Year	Old Ireland in Colour by John Breslin and Dr Sarah-Anne Buckley
Non-Fiction Book of the Year	A Ghost in the Throat by Doireann Ní Ghríofa
Cookbook of the Year	Neven Maguire's Midweek Meals in Minutes by Neven Maguire
Popular Fiction Book of the Year	Home Stretch by Graham Norton
Popular Non-Fiction Book of the Year	Never Mind the B#ll*cks, Here's the Science by Luke O'Neill
Children's Book of the Year, Junior	The Great Irish Farm Book by Darragh McCullough, illustrated by Sally Caulwell
Children's Book of the Year, Senior	Break the Mould by Sinéad Burke, illustrated by Natalie Byrne
Teen & Young Adult Book of the Year	Savage Her Reply by Deirdre Sullivan, illustrated by Karen Vaughan
Sports Book of the Year	Champagne Football by Mark Tighe & Paul Rowan
Newcomer of the Year	Diary of a Young Naturalist by Dara McAnulty
Irish Language Book of the Year	Cnámh by Eoghan Mac Giolla Bhríde
RTÉ Audience Choice Award	A Light That Never Goes Out by Keelin Shanley
Short Story of the Year	I Ate It All And I Really Thought I Wouldn't by Caoilinn Hughes
Poem of the Year	In the Museum of Misremembered Things by Linda McKenna
International Recognition Award	Lee Child

=== 2021 ===
The awards ceremony was broadcast online on 23 November 2021.

On 8 December, We Don't Know Ourselves: A Personal History of Ireland Since 1958 was announced as Irish Book of the Year during a one-hour television special on RTÉ One.

Award	Winner
Novel of the Year	Beautiful World, Where Are You by Sally Rooney
Crime Fiction Book of the Year	56 Days by Catherine Ryan Howard
Best Irish Published Book of the Year	The Coastal Atlas of Ireland by Val Cummins, Robert Devoy, Barry Brunt, Darius Bartlett and Sarah Kandrot
Non-Fiction Book of the Year	We Don't Know Ourselves: A Personal History of Ireland Since 1958 by Fintan O'Toole
Cookbook of the Year	Everyday Cook by Donal Skehan
Popular Fiction Book of the Year	Aisling and the City by Emer McLysaght and Sarah Breen
Children's Book of the Year, Junior	A Hug for You by David King, illustrated by Rhiannon Archard
Children's Book of the Year, Senior	The Summer I Robbed a Bank by David O'Doherty, illustrated by Chris Judge
Teen & Young Adult Book of the Year	The New Girl by Sinead Moriarty
Sports Book of the Year	Fight or Flight: My Life, My Choices by Keith Earls, with Tommy Conlon
Newcomer of the Year	Snowflake by Louise Nealon
Irish Language Book of the Year	Madame Lazare by Tadhg Mac Dhonnagáin
RTÉ Audience Choice Award	Your One Wild and Precious Life by Maureen Gaffney
Lifestyle Book of the Year	Décor Galore by Laura De Barra
Biography of the Year	Did Ye Hear Mammy Died? by Séamas O'Reilly
Author of the Year	Marian Keyes
Short Story of the Year	Little Lives by Deirdre Sullivan
Poem of the Year	Longboat at Portaferry by Siobhan Campbell
Bookshop of the Year	Kennys Bookshop and Art Gallery, Galway
Lifetime Achievement Award	Sebastian Barry

=== 2022 ===
The awards ceremony was broadcast online on 23 November 2022.

On 7 December, My Fourth Time, We Drowned was announced as Irish Book of the Year during a one-hour television special on RTÉ One.

Award	Winner
Novel of the Year	Trespasses by Louise Kennedy
Crime Fiction Book of the Year	Breaking Point by Edel Coffey
Best Irish Published Book of the Year	An Irish Folklore Treasury by John Creedon
Non-Fiction Book of the Year	My Fourth Time, We Drowned by Sally Hayden
Cookbook of the Year	The Daly Dish: Bold Food Made Good by Gina and Karol Daly
Popular Fiction Book of the Year	Again, Rachel by Marian Keyes
Children's Book of the Year, Junior	Our Big Day by Bob Johnston, illustrated by Michael Emberley
Children's Book of the Year, Senior	Girls Who Slay Monsters by Ellen Ryan, illustrated by Shona Shirley Macdonald
Teen & Young Adult Book of the Year	Let's Talk by Richie Sadlier
Sports Book of the Year	Kellie by Kellie Harrington, with Roddy Doyle
Newcomer of the Year	There's Been a Little Incident by Alice Ryan
Irish Language Book of the Year	EL by Thaddeus Ó Buachalla
Lifestyle Book of the Year	An Irish Atlantic Rainforest: A Personal Journey into the Magic of Rewilding by Eoghan Daltun
Biography of the Year	Time and Tide by Charlie Bird, with Ray Burke
Author of the Year	John Boyne
Short Story of the Year	"This Small Giddy Life" by Nuala Ní Chonchúir
Poem of the Year	Wedding Dress by Martina Dalton
Bookshop of the Year	Bridge Street Books, Wicklow
Lifetime Achievement Award	Anne Enright

=== 2023 ===
The awards were announced at a ceremony at Dublin's Convention Centre on 22 November 2023.

The Book of the Year winner was The Bee Sting by Paul Murray which was announced on 6 December 2023.

Award	Winner
Novel of the Year	The Bee Sting by Paul Murray
Crime Fiction Book of the Year	Strange Sally Diamond by Liz Nugent
Best Irish Published Book of the Year	Sunday Miscellany: A Selection 2018–2023 edited by Sarah Binchy
Non-Fiction Book of the Year	A Thread of Violence by Mark O'Connell
Cookbook of the Year	Flavour by Mark Moriarty, with photography by Cliodhna Prendergast
Popular Fiction Book of the Year	My Hot Friend by Sophie White
Children's Book of the Year, Junior	The President's Dog by Peter Donnelly
Children's Book of the Year, Senior	I Am The Wind: Irish Poems for Children Everywhere edited by Lucina Jacob and Sarah Webb, illustrated by Ashwin Chacko
Teen & Young Adult Book of the Yea	Black and Irish: Legends, Trailblazers and Everyday Heroes by Leon Diop and Briana Fitzsimons, illustrated by Jessica Louis
Sports Book of the Year	The Grass Ceiling by Eimear Ryan (Irish author)
Newcomer of the Year	Kala by Colin Walsh
Irish Language Book of the Year	Imram agus Scéalta Eile by Róise Ní Bhaoill
Lifestyle Book of the Year	The Hike Life by Roz Purcell
Biography of the Year	Poor by Katriona O'Sullivan
Author of the Year	Claire Keegan
Short Story of the Year	"Such A Pretty Face " by Moïra Fowley
Poem of the Year	Vectors in Kabul by Mary O'Donnell
Bookshop of the Year	Halfway up the Stairs in Greystones, County Wicklow
Listeners' Choice Award	Poor by Katriona O'Sullivan
New Voices: The An Post Writing Prize	The Border / Кордон – Valeriia Shmyrova
Lifetime Achievement Award	Roy Foster

=== 2024 ===
The 2024 winners were announced on 27 November, again in the Convention Centre.

Award	Winner
Best Irish-Published Book of the Year	The Irish Words You Should Know by Hector Ó hEochagáin
Biography of the Year	Nature Boy: A Journey of Birdsong and Belonging by Seán Ronayne
History Book of the Year	Atlas of the Irish Civil War: New Perspectives by Hélène O'Keeffe, John Crowley, Donal Ó Drisceoil, John Borgonovo and Mike Murphy
Non-Fiction Book of the Year	Missing Persons, Or My Grandmother's Secrets by Clair Wills
Novel of the Year	Heart, Be at Peace by Donal Ryan
Food & Drink Book of the Year	Irish Food History: A Companion by Máirtín Mac Con Iomaire and Dorothy Cashman
Lifestyle Book of the Year	Gaeilge i Mo Chroí – Irish in My Heart: Your Guide to Loving and Living the Irish Language by Molly Nic Céile
Author of the Year	Sally Rooney
Sports Book of the Year	Obsessed: The Autobiography by Johnny Sexton with Peter O'Reilly
Irish Language Book of the Year	Geansaithe Móra by Gearóidín Nic Cárthaigh
Children's Book of the Year	Junior: The Golden Hare by Paddy Donnelly
Children's Book of the Year	Senior: Fia and the Last Snow Deer by Eilish Fisher, illustrated by Dermot Flynn
Teen and Young Adult Book of the Year, in honour of John Treacy	Something's About to Blow Up by Sam Blake
Crime Fiction Book of the Year	A Stranger in the Family by Jane Casey
Newcomer of the Year	The Coast Road by Alan Murrin
Popular Fiction Book of the Year	Frankie by Graham Norton
Special Recognition Award	Paul Howard
Listeners' Choice Award	The Last Disco: The Story of the Stardust Tragedy by Sean Murray, Christine Bohan and Nicky Ryan
New Irish Writing Best Short Story	Valentine's Day by Kathleen Macadam
New Irish Writing Best Poetry	Onionskin by Eilín de Paor
Bookshop of the Year	Little A
Lifetime Achievement Award	Martin Waddell

=== 2025 ===
The 2025 winners were announced on 27 November.

Award	Winner
TheJournal.ie Best Irish-Published Book of the Year	Ninety-Nine Words for Rain (and One for Sun) by Manchán Magan & Megan Luddy
Dubray Biography of the Year	A Time for Truth: My Father Jason and My Search for Justice and Healing by Sarah Corbett Lynch
Hodges Figgis History Book of the Year	Great Irish Wives by Nicola Pierce
Irish Book Week Non-Fiction Book of the Year	Deadly Silence: A Sister’s Battle to Uncover the Truth Behind the Murder of Clodagh and Her Sons by Alan Hawe by Jacqueline Connolly & Kathryn Rogers
Easons Novel of the Year	Nesting by Roisín O'Donnell
Bookstation Lifestyle Book of the Year	Sophie’s Swaps by Sophie Morris
Library Association of Ireland Author of the Year	Elaine Feeney
Easons Sports Book of the Year	Heart on My Sleeve by Andrew Porter
Gradam Love Leabhar Gaeilge Leabhar Ficsin Gaeilge na Bliana	Bódléar by Darach Ó Scolaí
Specsavers Children's Book of the Year	Junior: Run Home, Little Fox by Tom McCaughren, Erika McGann & Shannon Bergin
Specsavers Children's Book of the Year	Senior: Animalopedia by Kathi Burke and John Burke
International Education Services Teen & Young Adult Book of the Year, in honour of John Treacy	Solo by Gráinne O'Brien
The Book Centre Crime Fiction Book of the Year	It Should Have Been You by Andrea Mara
Sunday Independent Newcomer of the Year	Show Me Where It Hurts by Claire Gleeson
Ireland AM Popular Fiction Book of the Year	Paper Heart by Cecelia Ahern
The Last Word Listeners' Choice Award	The Ghosts of Rome by Joseph O'Connor
New Irish Writing Best Short Story in association with the Irish Independent	Pádhraic Quinn for All The Birch Trees Were Waving
New Irish Writing Best Poetry in association with the Irish Independent	Vincent Barton for There’s never a crowd at the poetry section
Bookshop of the Year	Chapters Bookstore in Dublin
Lifetime Achievement Award	Michael D. Higgins
