= Desmond Egan =

Irish poet (born 1936)

Desmond Egan (born 15 July 1936 in Athlone, County Westmeath) is an Irish poet. He has published 24 Collections of poetry and published translations of Sophocles' Philoctetes and Euripides' Medea. His own work has been translated into Albanian, Bulgarian, Croatian, Czech, Dutch, French, German, Greek, Hungarian, Italian, Japanese, Polish, Swedish, Chinese, Spanish, Slovenian and Russian. He founded The Goldsmith Press (1972), edited the quarterly magazine for the arts Era (1974-1984), and starting in 1987 he has served as artistic director of the Gerard Manley Hopkins International Festival each July in Kildare, Ireland.

== Life ==
Egan was born in Athlone in the Irish midlands. His parents were Thomas Egan, businessman and National School teacher Kathleen Garland. He attended St Finian's College in Mullingar, then University at St Patrick's College, Maynooth (now Maynooth University), where he obtained his BA (1962), and University College Dublin, where he obtained his MA (1965). He returned to his old school St Finian’s (1965-1971) to teach Greek, then taught English at Newbridge College, County Kildare. He settled in Newbridge and gave up teaching in 1987 to focus on writing as a career. He is married to the writer Vivienne Abbot. They have two daughters, Kate and Bebhin. Egan is fluent in Irish and speaks/reads French, German and Spanish. Also proficient in Classical Greek.

== Collections ==
- 1972. Midland, Newbridge, Ireland: The Goldsmith Press. With drawings by Brian Bourke
- 1972. Poiemata, Readings in Poetry and Prose for Young People, chosen by Egan, Rice. Dublin: Fallons
- 1973 Choice, An anthology of Irish poetry selected by the poets themselves. Edited by Desmond Egan and Michael Hartnett, Newbridge, Ireland: The Goldsmith Press
- 1974 Leaves, Newbridge, Ireland: The Goldsmith Press. With drawings by Charles Cullen
- 1976 Siege, Newbridge, Ireland: The Goldsmith Press
- 1978 Woodcutter, Newbridge, Ireland: The Goldsmith Press. Illustrations by Alberto Giacometti
- 1980 Athlone?, Newbridge, Ireland: The Goldsmith Press. With photographs by Fergus Bourke
- 1983 Seeing Double, Newbridge, Ireland: The Goldsmith Press. With illustrations by Alex Sadkowsky
- 1983 Collected Poems, Orono, Maine, NPF. Winner of The National Poetry Foundation of USA Award
- 1989 A Song for my Father, Newbridge, Ireland: The Kavanagh Press
- 1990 The Death of Metaphor, essays, Gerrard's Cross, England: Colin Smythe
- 1991 Medea, translation of Euripides. St. Andrew's Press, Laurinburg, USA
- 1992 Peninsula, Poems of the Dingle Peninsula. Newbridge, Ireland: The Kavanagh Press. With Photographs by Liam Lyons
- 1992 Snapdragon, Little Rock, Arkansas: Milestone Press
- 1992 Selected Poems, Omaha, Nebraska: Creighton University Press. Selected and with Introduction by Hugh Kenner
- 1994 Poems for Eimear, Limited Edition. Little Rock, Arkansas. Milestone Press
- 1994 In the Holocaust of Autumn A sequence in nine parts; Foreword by Ben Briscoe. Newbridge, Ireland: The Goldsmith Press
- 1995 Elegies, Newbridge, Ireland: The Goldsmith Press
- 1997 Famine, Newbridge, Ireland: The Goldsmith Press. With drawings by James McKenna
- 1998 Philoctetes, translation of Sophocles. Little Rock, Arkansas: Milestone Press, USA
- 1999 Prelude: A Sequence of Poems for Hans Pålsson, Pianist. Limited ed., Newbridge, Ireland: The Goldsmith Press
- 2000 Music, Newbridge, Ireland: The Goldsmith Press
- 2001 The Hill of Allen, Newbridge, Ireland: The Goldsmith Press. With drawings by James McKenna
- 2005 The Outdoor Light, Newbridge, Ireland: The Goldsmith Press
- 2009 The Bronze Horseman, Essays, Newbridge, Ireland: The Goldsmith Press
- 2012 Hopkins in Kildare, Newbridge, Ireland: The Goldsmith Press
- 2015 Epic, Newbridge, Ireland: The Goldsmith Press
- 2017 Hopeful Hopkins, Essays, Newbridge, Ireland: The Goldsmith Press
- 2024 "Laptop," Poems, Newbridge, Ireland: The Goldsmith Press

== Anthologies ==
- Eva Hesse, Lyrik Importe, ein Lesebuch, Aachen: Rimbuad, 2004
- Hunderose: Neue Irische Gedichte, Augsburg: Maroverlag, 1983
- Wenzell (ed.), Woven Shades of Green: Irish Nature Literature, Lewisburg: Bucknell Press, 2019
- Koesu / Sekine (eds.), Irish Writers and Politics, Gerrads Cross: Colin Smythe, 1989
- Gunnar Harding, Bengt Jangfeldt (eds.), Artes, 3, Stockholm, 1997
- Robert Welch (ed.) Irish Writers and Religion, Maryland: Barnes & Noble, 1992
- J-Y Masson (ed.), Anthologie de la Poesie irlandaise du XXe siecle, Paris: Verdier, 1996
- ThomasFoster Elizabeth Guthrioen(eds.), A Year in Poetry, New York: Crown Publishers, 1995
- Juri Talvet (ed.) Valitud tolkeluulet Anthology II (1970-2020), Tartu: Ulikool, 2022

== DVDs / CDs ==
- CD: Needing the Sea, Goldsmith Press, Newbridge, Co. Kildare, 1995. John Hunter/Jim Kelly, Directors
- DVD: Desmond Egan; Through the Eyes of a Poet, Washburn University and KTWU, Kansas

== Books in translation ==
French

- Terre et Paix 1989 tr. Patrick Rafroidi, Daniel Jacquin et al.
- Holocauste d’Autumne 1998 tr. Jean Poncet
- Peninsula 1996 tr. Jean Paul Blot
- Elegies 2000 Bruno Gaurier
- Music et Autres Poemes 2005 tr. Jean Paul Blot (Prix du livres Insulaires, 2005)
- Athlone 2015 tr. Bruno Gaurier
- Famine 2018 tr. Bruno Gaurier

Irish

- Mo Rogha tr. Michael Hartnett, edited by Diarmuid Johnson, 2022

German

- Meine Geschichte der Irischen Dichtung/ My Irish Poems 1995 tr. S.Kohl; M. Pfister et al.
- Gedichte/ Poems 1999 tr. U. Borgmann/ S. Kohl

Dutch

- Echobogen/ Echo Arches 1990 tr. P Nijmeijer

Russian

- Selected Poems 1999 tr. Alla Savtchenko, Maria Popova
- Poems 2000 tr. Alla Savtchenko

Italian

- Quel Sole Storno Che Gelido Passa 1992 translator Giuseppe Serpillo
- Poesie Scelte/ Selected Poems 1994 tr. Francesco Marroni
- Carestia/ Famine 2000 tr. Donatella Abbate Badin
- Un Poeta di Irlanda 1990 tr. Enzo Bonventre

Spanish

- De Hambruna/ Famine 2002 tr. Marcus Hormiga

Czech

- Smiluj nad Basnikem/ Have Mercy on the Poet 1992 tr. Ivana Bozdechová
- DESpectrum (CD included) Poems and appreciations 2002 /2007 tr. Ivana Bozdechová

Chinese

- September Dandelion 2008 tr. Jin Wenning

Polish

- Poezje Wybrane/ Selected Poems 2002 tr. Aleksandra Kedzierska

Japanese

- Paper Cranes 1995 tr. Akira Yasukawa et al.

Greek

- Poiemata/ Poems 2001 tr. Georgia Ghinis
- Selected Poems tr. Despina Pirketti 2024

Greek Cypriot

- Choice, translated by Despina Pirketti 2022

Croatian

- Christ in Connaught Street 2009 tr. Emil Cic
- Elegies 2018 tr. Nikola Duretic

Hungarian

- Selected Poems 2000 tr. Tomas Kabdebo

Bulgarian

- Selected Poems 1999 tr. D. Paryeba

Slovenian

- Too Little Peace/ Selected Poems 2007 tr. Robert Simonisek

Swedish

- How Lonely the Soul tr. Lena Koster 2019
- Selected Poems tr. Lena Koster forthcoming 2022

Romanian

- Black Windows, Selected Poems tr. Emilia Ivancu forthcoming 2022

== Editor ==
- Poiemata Poetry and Prose for Young People 1972
- Focus (with Eoghan O Tuairisc) 1972
- Choice An Anthology of Modern Irish Poetry with Michael Hartnett 1973
- The Deserted Village edited, with Introduction 1974, reprinted 1977
- Brian Bourke: Marcel Marceau Drawings Introduction 1978
- Brian Bourke: a Catalogue of his Work, editor 1982
- Lost in the Woods Introduction, 1992
- James McKenna; A Celebration ed. with Introduction 2007
- James McKenna The Complete Catalogue ed. with Introduction 2008

== Review editor ==
- Era Magazine 1,2,3,4,5,6,7 1975 to 1978

== Poster poems ==
- Requiem Illustrated by Charles Cullen
- Listening to John McCormack Illustrated by Charles Cullen
- Needing the Sea Illustrated by Alex Sadkowski
- Brother Sister Chile Illustrated by Kathy Owens
- For Benjamin Moloise Illustrated by James McKenna
- First Communion
- For Rudy Romano Illustrated by Henry Flanagan
- Understanding God Too Quickly In Topeka Illustrated by John Hunter
- For Bill Langdon Illustrated by Wilhelm Fockersperger
- Freedom Illustrated by Wilhelm Fockersperger
- Newbridge College
- Peace illustrated by Brian Bourke
- Forget Me Not
- Requiem illus. by James McKenna 2018

== Awards ==
- 1983: Stanford Poetry Award 1983
- 1983: National Poetry Foundation of USA Award for Collected Poems
- 1987: Chicago Haymarket Literary Award
- 1989: The Farrell Prize, New York
- 1996: Honorary D.Litt. from Washburn University, Kansas, USA
- 1998: Bologna Literary Award, Italy
- 2001: Premio Anfiosso Literary Award (Italy)
- 2004: Macedonia Literature Award
- 2005: Ouessant (France) International Literary Award
- 2010: Arpino (Italy): Il Libro di Pietra plaque
- 2012: Newbridge Town Culture Award
- 2015: Kildare County Council Literature Award
- 2015: IBAM, Irish Books and Media (Chicago) Award for Literature

== Offices held ==
- Founder and Artistic Director, The Gerard Manley Hopkins International Festival, Newbridge College: 1987 to present
- Juror The Neustadt International Literature Award University of Oklahoma 1999
- Cultural Relations Committee, Dept. of Foreign Affairs 2000 - 2003; 2003 - 2006
- Hon. President, The Classical Society of Ireland, 2004

== Conference lecturer/reader ==
USA

- Ezra Pound Conferences
- TS Eliot Conference;
- Patrick Kavanagh Conference
- American Conferences on Irish Studies
- I.A.S.I.L. Conference etc.

Italy Sardinia France UK Germany Spain Macedonia Belgium Croatia Nicaragua Austria South Korea China Japan Sweden Ireland: W.B. Yeats Conference First Creative Writing Director Patrick Kavanagh Weekend UCD First Poet in Residence; Lecture series Galway Classical Conference John Broderick Weekend, Athlone Ireland Classical Society Presidential Lecture NUI Maynooth French and English Groups; IASIL Conference The Hopkins Festival Michael Hartnett Weekend, Dublin Gerard Manley Hopkins Festivals

== Selected articles ==
- The Book of Kells Art and Antiques USA c.1990
- Peter Connolly The Furrow
- The Dominicans of Galway Yearbook, 1991
- Patrick Kavanagh in P.K. Man and Poet USA 1991
- Happy Hopkins Studies, winter 2012
- Art and Illness 2nd World Humanities Forum Proceedings 2012
- Gabriel Marcel Kansas Journal 2019

== Essays / reviews ==
- Various Countries incl. USA, UK, France, Germany, Ireland

== Portraits ==
- Brian Bourke 1972
- Brian Bourke Triptique 1988
- Charles Cullen 1974
- Alex Sadkowsky 1982
- Wilhelm Fockersperger c.10 times
- Chinese Artist 1990
- James McKenna 1998
