= Devoy =

Devoy is a surname. Notable people with the surname include:

- Dawson Devoy (born 2001), Irish footballer
- John Devoy (1842–1928), Irish rebel leader and journalist
- Susan Devoy (born 1964), New Zealand squash player
- Robert Devoy, Irish geographer
