= Leonardo Omar Onida =

Italian poet and art director (born 1973)

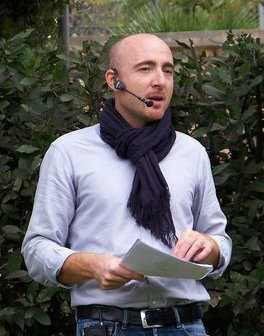
- Leonardo Omar Onida in 2012
- Born: Leonardo Omar Onida; July 19, 1973 (age 53); Sassari
- Occupations: poet, art director

Leonardo Omar Onida (born 19 July 1973) is a poet who is artistic director of Ottobre in Poesia, an annual literary festival in Sassari, Sardinia, Italy.

== Biography ==
Onida is a graduate in philosophy at University of Sassari and specialized in migration and social policies. He is coordinator of training courses and currently working in information technology and communications.

He is co-founder of Equi-tao project, founder and artistic director of the festival Ottobre in Poesia, International Literary Prize of the city of Sassari that is an integral part of the festival and president of the association POP – Progetto Ottobre in Poesia. Author of poems selected and included in numerous anthologies like Isla Negra, Anguillara Sabazia città d’arte, IoScrivo, Isola near. Author of the prose story Frammenti dal caos, published as a prize for all his distinctions achieved in literary field.

Chosen by the poets and artists Giovanna Mulas and Gabriel Impaglione as responsible and spokesman for Sardinia of the festival Palabra en el Mundo, founded and promote by the Festival di Poesia dell’Havana in Cuba, one of the most important festival in the world, with the collaboration of the members of the Brazilian Congress of Poetry.

== Ottobre in Poesia ==
In 2007, Leonardo Omar Onida founded and given life to the poetry festival Ottobre in Poesia, in which come one after the other meetings with authors, readings, shows, concerts, art installations; all events that, in last editions, they spread and widened also involving nearby cities.

First guest who accepted enthusiastically the invitation of Leonardo was Alda Merini. Others personalities who have accepted the invitation were Giovanna Mulas, Gabriel Impaglione, Carlos Sanchez, and Desmond Egan

== Publications ==
- Frammenti del caos, (Ed. Montedit, 2005), ISBN 9788883569111

== Prizes ==
Winner of national and international literary prize in poetry section, like Francesco Flora prize (Colle Sannita - 1996), Forico Sechi prize with honorable mention (Sassari - 2003), il Marguerite Yourcenar prize (Melegnano – 2004), Arcobaleno della Vita prize (Rovigo 2007).
