= Ronan O'Brien =

Irish writer

Ronan O'Brien (born 1974, Dublin) is an Irish author, winner of the 2009 Irish Book Awards "Newcomer of the Year" for his first novel Confessions of a Fallen Angel.

He studied law at University College Dublin and then obtained a master's degree in modern drama studies. His primary career is as a solicitor specialising in criminal law. He lives in County Kildare with his wife Rita and is currently working on his second novel.
