= Sarah Webb (writer) =

Irish writer

- Born: Dalkey, Co. Dublin
- Education: Trinity College Dublin
- Known for: Winner at Irish Book Awards

Sarah Webb is an Irish writer, the author of more than 30 books, primarily for children and young adults, and mostly fiction. A two-time winner in the Irish Book Awards, and of a medal from the Library Association of Ireland, she also works in the book trade, and in the promotion of reading and libraries for children.

== Early life ==
Webb was born in Dalkey, in the southern suburbs of Dublin. Her father was a quantity surveyor and her mother worked as a teacher; her grandfather was William Bedell Stanford.

She completed a degree in English and History of Art at Trinity College Dublin. After various part-time jobs, Webb worked for the world's third-oldest bookshop, Hodges Figgis, and then for three bookselling chains: Hughes and Hughes, then Waterstones as children's book buyer, and then Easons as that firm's first children's book buyer and marketing manager. After a period focused on writing, though still sometimes consulting with Dubray Books, Webb returned to working in bookselling, as the events manager for independent bookshop 'Halfway Up the Stairs' in Greystones.

== Writing career ==
Webb writes for both children and adults and has had her work published in multiple languages across a number of countries. She had several book reviews published with the Southside News in Dublin, and subsequently also wrote for other newspapers and magazines. Then while working full time at Waterstones, writing at night, she completed and released her first book in 1997/1998, a cook book for children, followed by two more. After a three-book contract with Poolbeg Press, she secured a multi-book contract with Pan Macmillan. Her novel Always the Bridesmaid topped the Irish charts for over two months.

== Campaigning ==
Today Webb is considered a significant force for children's books in Ireland, as evidenced by the award at the 2015 CBI Book of the Year Awards for Outstanding Contribution to Children's Books in Ireland. She has expressed concern at the absence of Irish writers for children from the national bestseller lists, and the fact that even teachers may not know the names of such writers, and is the co-founder of a group working to address these issues, Discover Irish Children's Books, with fellow authors and booksellers, as well as librarians, teachers, illustrators and others.

Webb has also expressed strong support for greater provision of libraries in Irish schools, stating that if she won a lottery, she would fund this.

== Recognition ==
Webb was the Dun Laoghaire library Writer in Residence for 2016-2017 and she has been a children's programmer for MoLI – the Museum of Literature Ireland – and been a coordinator and/or panelist at various book festivals, such as 'Mountain to Sea'.

Her books Blazing a Trail: Irish Women Who Changed the World, illustrated by Lauren O'Neill, and A Sailor Went to Sea, Sea, Sea, illustrated by Steve McCarthy, have both won Irish Book Awards.

In addition to her 2015 CBI award for Outstanding Contribution to Children's Books in Ireland, she was awarded the President's Medal of the Library Association of Ireland for 2024 for her work in promoting books, school and public libraries and reading for younger people.

== Personal life ==
Having started writing while a single mother, as of 2011, Webb had three children. As of 2025, she lives in Dun Laoghaire, County Dublin with her partner and children, and spends time in Castletownshend, West Cork.

== Bibliography ==
=== Novels ===
- Three Times a Lady (2000)
- Always the Bridesmaid (2001)
- Something to Talk About (2002)
- Some Kind of Wonderful (2003)
- It Had to Be You (2004)
- Take a Chance (2005)
- When the Boys Are Away (2007)
- Mums the Word (2007)
- Anything for Love (2009)
- The Loving Kind (2010)
- The Shoestring Club (2012)
- The Memory Box (2013)
- The Little Bee Charmer of Henrietta Street (2021)
- The Weather Girls (2024)

=== Children's series ===
==== Ask Amy Green ====
1. Boy Trouble (2009)
2. Summer Secrets (2010)
3. Bridesmaid Blitz (2010)
4. Love and Other Drama-Ramas (2011)
5. Dancing Daze (2012)
6. Wedding Belles (2013)

==== Songbird Cafe Girls ====
1. Mollie Cinnamon Is Not a Cupcake (2015)
2. Sunny Days and Moon Cakes (2015)
3. Aurora and the Popcorn Dolphin (2016)

=== Picture books ===
- Emma the Penguin (2010)
- A Sailor Went to Sea, Sea, Sea (2017)
- Dare to Dream (2019) (with Graham Corcoran)
- Sally Go Round the Stars (2020) (with Claire Ranson)
- The One With The Waggly Tail (2020)

=== Non fiction ===
- Kids Can Cook (1998)
- Children's Parties (1998)
- Kids Can Cook: Around the world (2001)
- Blazing a Trail (2018)
- Animal Crackers (2020)
- Be Inspired! (2022)
