= Emer McLysaght =

Irish journalist

- Born: 1980 (age 45–46)
- Education: Ballyfermot College of Further Education
- Occupations: Author, journalist

Emer McLysaght (born 1980) is an Irish journalist and co-author of the Aisling series of novels.

== Background ==
McLysaght is from Kill, County Kildare. After secondary school, she attended Trinity College Dublin, where she studied biology for a short time. In 2003, she switched courses to a Higher National Diploma in media studies at Ballyfermot College of Further Education where she met her friend and future co-author Sarah Breen. She graduated with a Bachelor of Arts in media production from Dublin City University, obtaining first class honours. In 2012, McLysaght completed a master's degree in international relations, again achieving first class honours. She dedicated her first book to her late father, who died in 2008.

== Career ==
McLysaght began her media career as a newsreader and reporter at Kfm radio station in 2004, moving to Newstalk radio for a brief period in 2006. Later in 2006, she moved to Phantom 105.2 where she was news editor for four years. She has also worked as a freelance journalist for the Business Post, the Leinster Leader, Radio Nova, and Today FM. In 2011, she joined TheJournal.ie before being promoted to deputy editor at TheDailyEdge.ie in 2013 and editor in 2017. In March 2017, McLysaght left her editorial role and became a full-time author. She is a regular columnist for The Irish Times.

== Aisling novels ==
McLysaght and Breen co-created a comedic character named Aisling, establishing a Facebook fan group that grew to more than 45,000 members. As Aisling gained in popularity they were approached by publishers and decided to write a novel. As of 2021, the series consists of four books, with a further final book planned. The first three books were bestsellers and sold over 300,000 copies. They are published by Gill Books and Penguin Books.

== Personal life ==
McLysaght has spoken publicly about her mental health and use of counselling. On The Ryan Tubridy Show she discussed her experiences dealing with an eating disorder which began when she was a teenager. She underwent treatment as an in-patient at St Patrick's psychiatric hospital in Dublin from January to March 2020.

== Awards ==
- 2019 Irish Book Awards Popular Fiction Book of the Year – Once, Twice, Three Times an Aisling
- 2018 Irish Book Awards Popular Fiction Book of the Year – The Importance of Being Aisling
- 2021 Irish Book Awards Popular Fiction Book of the Year – Aisling and the City

== Bibliography ==
- Our Deadly Summer (2026)
- Aisling Ever After (2024)
- Aisling and The City (2021)
- Once, Twice, Three Times An Aisling (2019)
- The Importance of Being Aisling (2019)
- Oh My God, What a Complete Aisling (2017)
