= Aisling (book series) =

Novels by Emer McLysaght and Sarah Breen

- Cover of the first book, Oh My God, What a Complete Aisling.
- Oh My God, What a Complete Aisling (2017); The Importance of Being Aisling (2018); Once, Twice, Three Times and Aisling (2019); Aisling and the City (2021); Aisling Ever After (2023)
- Author: Emer McLysaght; Sarah Breen
- Country: Ireland
- Language: English
- Publisher: Gill Books; Penguin Books
- Published: 31 August 2017 – 31 August 2023
- No. of books: 5

The Aisling (sometimes referred to as OMGWACA) series of novels are five adult fiction books by Irish journalists and authors Emer McLysaght and Sarah Breen. The series began with Oh My God, What a Complete Aisling The Novel, based on an "Aisling" (or "Ais") character archetype created by the authors and discussed in the "oh my god what a complete aisling" Facebook group. There are five books total in the series. They were published by Gill Books and Penguin Books. The series was optioned as a film before being worked into a yet-to-be-produced TV series.

== Description ==
Aisling began as a stock character type, a "culchie" from "Ballygobackwards" (BGB), up in the "big smoke" Dublin. Other stock characters, Mad Tom Deddeh, Memmeh, Niamh and Fionn, all from "Across The Road" (FATR) were used by users in posts to describe Aisling's life and eccentricities. About Aisling, Sarra Manning, of Red Online, wrote that readers "laugh with her, never at her ... [admiring] her for the same traits that we don't necessarily value in ourselves. We love her because she's a complete Aisling and we wouldn't have her any other way". To date, the series contains five books:

- Oh My God, What a Complete Aisling (31 August 2017) 0-717-17980-X
- The Importance of Being Aisling (21 September 2018) 0-717-18160-X
- Once, Twice, Three Times and Aisling (12 September 2019) 0-717-18793-4
- Aisling and the City (8 October 2021) 0-717-19412-4
- Aisling Ever After (31 August 2023) 1-804-58036-8

== Reception ==
Actress Tara Flynn, writing for The Irish Times, thought that it would have been easy to make a book of lists about the characters, but that the first novel gave "Aisling the flesh and bones she deserves, and a story that licks along at a pace". Flynn hoped for a movie adaptation, and suggested she might portray Memmeh. Síle Ní Choincheannain, of Mary I College has described the series as having "deftly captured a unique Irish archetype and modern heroine".

The Importance of being Aisling won the 2018 "Popular Irish Fiction" category at the Irish Book Awards, with Once, Twice, Three Times an Aisling winning the same prize in 2019, and Aisling in the City in 2021.
