= Mary Costello (writer) =

Irish award-winning short story and novelist

Mary Costello is an Irish short story writer and novelist.

Mary Costello was born in Galway. She was a teacher before becoming a full-time writer. Her collection of short stories, The China Factory, published in 2012, was nominated for the Guardian First Book Award. Her second book and first novel, Academy Street, was shortlisted for the International Dublin Literary Award, the Costa First Novel Prize and the EU Prize for Literature in 2014. The novel went on to win the Irish Novel of the Year Award as well as the Irish Book of the Year. It has since been translated into several languages. Costello was awarded an Arts Council bursary in both 2011 and 2013. Her work has been serialised on BBC Radio 4. Costello's short story 'The Choc-Ice Woman' was published in the New Yorker Magazine on 16 October 2023. She lives in Dublin.

== Bibliography ==
- The China Factory (2012)
- Academy Street (2014)
- The River Capture (2019)
- Barcelona (2024)
- A Beautiful Loan (2026)
