= Seán Ronayne =

Irish ornithologist and writer (born 1988)

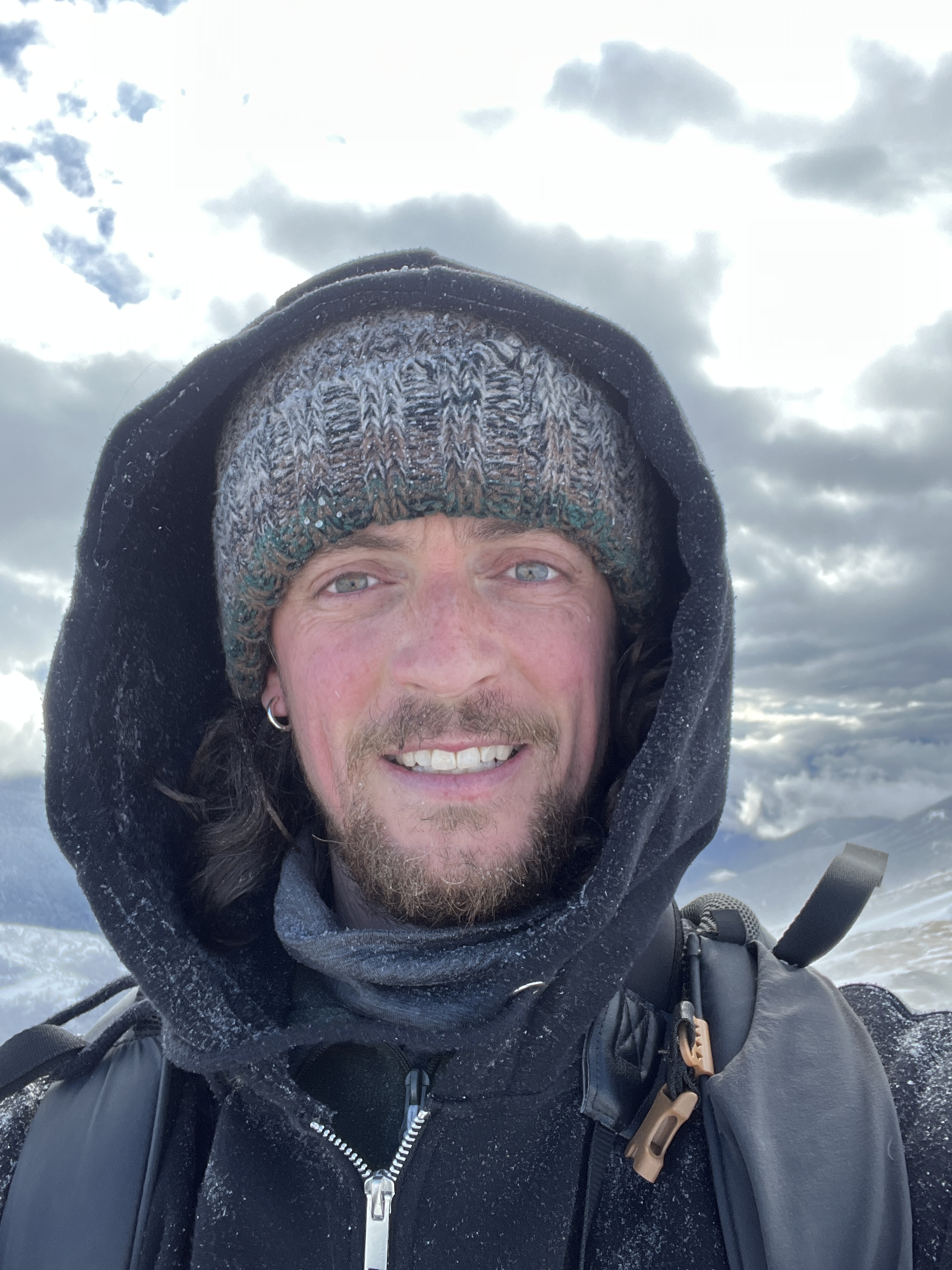
- Seán Ronayne in the Catalan Pyrenees, Winter 2025
- Born: 1988 (age 37–38); Cobh
- Occupations: Ornithologist, writer
- Writing career
- Notable works: Nature Boy: A Journey of Birdsong and Belonging (2024)

Seán Ronayne (born 1988, Cobh) is an Irish ornithologist, and writer from Cobh, County Cork.

== Early years and education ==
Seán Ronayne (born 20 April 1988, in Cobh, County Cork) developed a fascination with birds and nature from an early age. He began identifying species both by sight and by sound during childhood, guided in part by his father's encouragement. His interest in bird vocalisations grew into a lifelong pursuit of listening, recording, and studying wildlife.

In interviews, Ronayne has spoken about his deep connection to the sounds of wildlife, saying: "I've got two frequencies in my brain, the bird frequency and the human one. The bird frequency takes priority, always," and that "Every bird has a story, and when you record its voice, you're capturing a tiny piece of its life." These reflections convey his belief that attentive listening offers a way to understand and connect with the natural world.

After his secondary education at Coláiste Muire in Cobh, he studied zoology at University College Cork (UCC), where he later obtained master's degrees in marine biology and ecological impact assessment.

During or immediately after his postgraduate degrees, he spent several years living and surveying in Barcelona / Catalunya, where he began experimenting in wildlife sound recording and exploring Mediterranean and Pyrenean landscapes. On returning to Ireland in January 2021, he founded his project Irish Wildlife Sounds.

In 2026, Ronayne received the Alumni Achievement Award from University College Cork (UCC) - one of the highest accolades awarded to graduates of UCC.

== Career and field recording ==
Ronayne is especially interested in bird vocalisation and set himself the goal of recording the sounds of all of Irelands approximately 200 bird species. His fieldwork has taken him across the country of Ireland, amassing over 10,000 individual recordings by 2024.

He has released two albums of bird recordings, donating a quarter of the proceeds to BirdWatch Ireland. The first album, Wild Silence, was released in May 2024, followed by Hope in October 2024. Both works were praised for their immersive sound design and ecological message.

== Media appearances ==
Ronayne first came to public attention when he was featured in a short Irish Times video in May 2022, part of a series highlighting people with uncommon vocations. In the video, he discussed his mission to record the songs of all regularly occurring bird species in Ireland.

He made his on-screen debut in A Note for Nature, a documentary broadcast on RTÉ in December 2022, where he joined several well-known Irish conservationists and musicians to showcase both the beauty and fragility of Ireland's natural environment.

Ronayne gained widespread national recognition following his appearance on The Tommy Tiernan Show in January 2024, during which he discussed his ongoing project to record every bird species in Ireland. The segment was widely circulated on social media, significantly raising his public profile.

Writing in The Sunday Independent, Hilary White reflected on the moment, describing how "hirsute, casually attired, and refreshingly unmannered, Ronayne strolled onto the set of The Tommy Tiernan Show back in January and everything changed," adding that "two things made the nation sit up that night and take Ronayne to heart: his unadulterated joy for nature, and the sheer integrity of his purpose. He became a speaker in demand."

According to The Guardian, the appearance "went viral," transforming Ronayne — "a self-described shy person" — into "an unlikely and somewhat reluctant celebrity." He later said the sudden attention "was a bit stressful," but welcomed the chance "to promote the subject I care about the most."

Yay Cork described him as "the Cork bird whisperer everyone's talking about," noting that his segment provided "a comforting comedown" after a more sombre discussion earlier in the episode. In The Journal, a viewer comment described his appearance as "a breath of fresh air". His television exposure has been credited with increasing public awareness of Irish wildlife conservation and the practice of field-recording natural soundscapes.

He appeared in a five-minute segment of Springwatch 2025, Episode 1, which aired on 30 May 2025. In the feature, Seán discussed his ongoing project to record the songs of all bird species in Ireland and spoke about his deep connection to nature. He also reflected on his autism diagnosis, describing how it had a positive impact on his life, and became emotional when talking about parents who bring their autistic children to his talks, expressing gratitude for being able to serve as the role model he did not have growing up, due to his late diagnosis.

== Birdsong documentary ==
A 52-minute documentary film about Ronayne, Birdsong, was released in 2024. Directed by Kathleen Harris and produced by True Films for RTÉ, the film follows Ronayne's mission to capture Ireland's avian soundscape while exploring his experiences with autism. It received critical acclaim for its sound design and emotional storytelling. Birdsong is available to view in Ireland via the RTÉ Player. A seven-minute extended version was edited and sold to the BBC where it aired on BBC4 on 12 March 2025. It is available to view in the UK via the BBC iPlayer.

== Publications ==
Ronayne's autobiography, Nature Boy: A Journey of Birdsong and Belonging, won the Irish Book Award in the 'biography' category in 2024, where it was also short-listed for book of the year. It was further long-listed for the 2025 Wainwright Prize for Nature Writing. The book blends memoir and nature writing, addressing his lifelong passion for birds and his experiences of living with autism.

== Awards and honours ==
=== Alumni Achievement Award ===
- 2026- Alumni Achievement Award, University College Cork

=== Nature Boy (book) ===
- 2024 – Dubray Biography of the Year — An Post Irish Book Awards
- 2024 – Book of the Year – An Post Irish Book Awards (shortlisted)
- 2025 – Wainwright Prize for Nature Writing (longlisted)

=== Birdsongs (RTÉ Lyric FM series) ===
- 2025 – IMRO Radio Awards – Gold, Short Feature

=== Birdsong (documentary film) ===
- 2024 – Jackson Wild Media Awards – Honourable mention
- 2025 – International Wildlife Film Festival – Special Jury Award
- 2025 – RTS Ireland Television Awards – Specialist Factual Award
- 2025 – Capital Irish Film Festival – Audience Award
- 2025 – European Wildlife Film Awards – Best Story Award
- 2025 – Marsala Nature Film Festival – Best Director for Kathleen Harris
- 2025 – Innsbruck Nature Film Festival – Best Nature Documentary
- 2025 – Wildlife Film Festival Rotterdam – Nominated for the Festival Grand Prix, Awareness Award and People and Nature

=== Other recognitions ===
- 2020 – Sound of the Year Awards — Best Naturally Occurring Sound

== Broadcasting and public engagement ==
In 2025, Ronayne wrote and presented Birdsongs by Seán Ronayne, a short radio series for RTÉ lyric fm. The 16-episode programme, each episode lasting two to three minutes, combined field recordings with reflective commentary on bird behaviour and conservation. The series won Gold at the 2025 IMRO Radio Awards.

Ronayne has lectured widely on birds, wildlife sound recording, and conservation in Ireland. In 2025 he embarked on a national theatre tour featuring natural soundscapes, field recordings, his own poetry, and spoken narrative designed to promote awareness of Ireland's biodiversity crisis.

His public appearances and talks have been widely praised for their emotional resonance and accessibility. Writing in The Irish Times, Una Mullally observed that: "it's difficult to think of anyone in recent memory who has done more to impress upon the public the importance of birdlife in Ireland, and the significance of our biodiversity loss," adding that Ronayne's approach "often leaves audiences moved to tears."

== Personal life ==
Ronayne lived in Barcelona with his Catalan partner from 2018 till 2020. They moved to Ireland in 2020, and their daughter was born in Dublin in 2024.

During his late teens, Ronayne suffered a severe case of meningitis that left him close to death. He later said the experience "changed me for the good … it made me embrace my life," and that it deepened his sense of purpose in pursuing his work with nature. In the interview, he recalled how "my family came in to say goodbye to me … I should have died," describing the illness as a turning point that strengthened his appreciation for the natural world and motivated his later focus on birds and nature.

Ronayne has spoken openly about being autistic, describing the diagnosis as a clarifying and empowering experience that helped him understand his lifelong connection with nature. He was diagnosed in adulthood, and has said that his sensory sensitivity and intense focus, traits often associated with autism, have been crucial in developing his ability to identify and analyse birdsong. "My brain just works differently," he told The Guardian, explaining that his heightened attention to sound "lets me notice things others might miss." In his autobiography Nature Boy: A Journey of Birdsong and Belonging, Ronayne wrote that learning to embrace his neurodivergence allowed him to harness it as “a strength rather than a struggle,” using his focus and passion to advocate for wildlife and inclusion.

Ronayne has credited his partner, Alba, with playing a central role in supporting his career and creative work. The couple met in Cork, and she later encouraged him to dedicate himself fully to his passion for birds and sound recording. "It was Alba who said one day, 'Seán, you need to leave this job and follow your dreams. I've got your back,'" he recalled. "If it wasn't for Alba, there would be none of this — no book or film or album or interviews, nothing." In another interview, he said that Alba "knew the outdoors was my calling," describing her support as instrumental to his decision to focus entirely on conservation and field recording.

== Bibliography ==
Year	Title	Publisher	ISBN	Note
2024	Nature Boy: A Journey of Birdsong and Belonging	Hachette Books Ireland	ISBN 9781399738156	Irish Book Award 2024 in the category 'Biography'
