= Ear to the Ground =

- Created by: Indiepics
- Presented by: Ronan Clarke (until 2007); Helen Carroll; Darragh McCullough; Ella McSweeney; Maeve Dineen(until February 2008); Mairead McGuinness(until 2004)
- Country of origin: Ireland
- Original language: English
- No. of series: 29

Production
- Running time: 30 minutes

Original release
- Network: RTÉ One

Ear to the Ground is a weekly television programme broadcast on Ireland's RTÉ One on Thursday evenings at 19:00pm. Repeated on Sundays at 13.10pm. It consists of reports about rural, countryside and environmental issues. As of October 2021, it is in its twenty-ninth season. It is produced by Indiepics and presented by Ella McSweeney, Darragh McCullough and Helen Carroll. Previous presenters include Maeve Dineen, who left after the fifteenth season and the long-running Mairead McGuinness, who later became a Member of the European Parliament for Fine Gael. The show is repeated on RTÉ One after the lunchtime news each Sunday.
