= Anna Carey =

Irish writer, journalist, and musician

Anna Carey is an Irish author of young adult novels, and journalist and musician. Her first novel, The Real Rebecca, won the Children's Book of the Year (Senior Category) at the Irish Book Awards in 2011.

== Career ==
Carey toured and played with bands for 15 years, both as a singer and musician. During that time, she recorded with the band El Diablo and appeared on two of their albums.

She later became a young adult writer. She wrote a series of books with a protagonist named Rebecca, including The Real Rebecca and its sequels, Rebecca's Rules, Rebecca Rocks and Rebecca is Always Right. The books are written in the form of collected diary entries.

She also wrote a historical fiction series, with the first book titled The Making of Mollie. The book is set in Dublin in 1912; in it, a young girl becomes involved with the women's suffrage movement. The novel's narrative follows a sequence of letters sent to the main character's friend. The second book in the series, Mollie on the March, was published in 2018.

Carey's 2020 book, The Boldness of Betty, takes place in Dublin in 1913 during a labor strike. In 2020, the book was shortlisted for the Irish Book Awards Children's Book of the Year in the Senior category. The year after, it was shortlisted for the KPMG Children's Books Ireland Awards.

Her first novel for adults, Our Song, was published in 2025.

== Personal life ==
Carey is married to author and Irish Times journalist Patrick Freyne.

== Selected works ==
=== Rebecca series ===
- The Real Rebecca (2011)
- Rebecca's Rules (2012)
- Rebecca Rocks (2013)
- Rebecca is Always Right (2014)

=== Mollie series ===
- The Making of Mollie (2016)
- Mollie on the March (2018)

=== Standalone works ===
- The Boldness of Betty (2020)
