= Vicky Phelan =

Irish healthcare campaigner (1974–2022)

- Born: Victoria Kelly; 28 October 1974; Mooncoin, County Kilkenny, Ireland
- Died: 14 November 2022 (aged 48); Limerick, Ireland
- Education: University of Limerick (BA)
- Known for: Cervical Check campaigning
- Spouse: Jim Phelan
- Children: 2

Victoria Phelan (née Kelly; 28 October 1974 – 14 November 2022), was an Irish healthcare campaigner, best known for her campaigning in the CervicalCheck cancer scandal.

== Biography ==
Born Victoria Kelly on 28 October 1974 in Mooncoin in County Kilkenny to parents Gaby and John, Phelan grew up in Mooncoin. She attended the University of Limerick (UL), where she graduated with a BA in European Studies. She had been married to Jim Phelan, with whom she had two children.

In the 1990s, Phelan was injured in a car crash in France. The crash resulted in two deaths and another person being paralysed. Phelan survived but spent 10 days in a coma and was very badly wounded. She later said it gave her an insight into another form of healthcare system which was to be of value in her later experiences.

== CervicalCheck cancer scandal ==
In 2011, Phelan underwent testing for precancerous cervical cells as part of the CervicalCheck programme and was given the all clear. However, the smear reading was inaccurate and Phelan was diagnosed with cancer in 2014.

Phelan began a campaign to find out what had happened. The result of the investigation led to a State apology in 2018. She also took the state to court in 2017 and in 2018 settled a court case with Clinical Pathology Laboratories who had conducted the testing, winning a settlement worth €2.5 million. Phelan also refused to sign a non-disclosure agreement as part of this, which led to the discovery that hundreds of women could have benefitted from earlier treatment. This led the government to commission the Scally report, an investigation into the controversy carried out by Gabriel Scally. She and Stephen Teap, a fellow campaigner, founded the 221+ CervicalCheck patient group for women who had also received negative tests but were later diagnosed with cancer. Phelan was awarded an honorary doctorate from UL in June 2018 for her contribution to women's health. Phelan also supported the passage of the Dying with Dignity Bill, a bill with the aim of legislating for assisted dying.

Phelan campaigned for these women for accountability and the truth and was recognised across political and social lines as having stood up against the system and made Ireland a better place for women. She lent her voice to many issues which affected women in Ireland. Phelan was named as one of the BBC's 100 Women in 2018. In February 2022, Phelan was awarded the Freedom of Limerick in recognition of her role in the CervicalCheck campaign.

Phelan wrote her biography, Overcoming which won the An Post Irish Book of the Year award in 2019 as well as being the RTÉ Radio 1 Listeners’ Choice Award for that year. In 2022, a documentary about Phelan entitled Vicky was released in Irish cinemas.

== Death and legacy ==
Despite being told in 2018 that she had less than a year to live, Phelan went on to live for four more years. She successfully campaigned for access to pembrolizumab, which shrank her tumour and extended her life. She received further treatment in the United States, but in October 2021 she returned home to receive palliative care.

She died at Milford Hospice in County Limerick in the early hours of 14 November 2022, surrounded by her family. Numerous tributes were paid to Phelan from across the political spectrum and from her fellow campaigners. In a statement, President Michael D. Higgins commended "the powerful inner strength and dignity with which she not only faced her own illness, but with the sense of commitment to the public good and the rights of others with which she campaigned".

In February 2023, legislation was introduced by Minister for Health Stephen Donnelly to make open disclosure mandatory in the healthcare system, with Donnelly commenting that this bill was brought forward as a result of Phelan. Alan Kelly, a Labour TD and friend of Phelan's, described the bill as "Vicky's legacy".

== Bibliography ==
- Phelan, Vicky; Linehan, Naomi (2019). Overcoming: A Memoir. Hachette Ireland. ISBN 9781529318708. - An Post Irish Book of the Year 2019
