= Michael Harding =

Irish writer

Michael Harding (born 1953) is an Irish writer.

== Biography ==
Harding was born and raised in Cavan, Ireland. He went to St. Patrick's College, Maynooth, initially graduating as a lay graduate. He then taught for two years in St. Patrick's College in Cavan Town, then worked as a social worker in a prison. He returned to Maynooth as a seminarian and was ordained in 1980, after which he went to work in a parish in Fermanagh. He left the priesthood in 1985, then spent seventeen years practising Buddhism.

He is married to the sculptor Cathy Carman (whom he first met in 1984) and they have a daughter Sophia and a son, Simon. He lives in Tarmon, County Leitrim.

== Work ==
He is an active writer of novels and poetry. He is a regular columnist with The Irish Times. He was Writer in Association with The Abbey Theatre in 1993 and was Writer in Residence at Trinity College Dublin, in 1999.

== Publications ==
=== Novels ===
- Priest (1986)
- The Trouble With Sarah Gullion (1988)
- Bird in the Snow (2008)

=== Plays ===
- Strawboys, Peacock Abbey Theatre, 1987
- Una Pooka, Peacock Abbey Theatre, 1989
- Misogynist, Abbey Theatre, 1990
- Burying Brian Boru, Theatre Omnibus, 1990
- Where the Heart is, Project Arts Centre, 1993
- Hubert Murray's Widow, Peacock Abbey Theatre, 1993
- The Kiss, Project Arts Centre, 1994
- Ceacht Houdini, Amharclann de hIde, 1994
- Backsides to the Wind, Red Kettle, 1995
- Sour Grapes, Peacock Abbey Theatre, 1997
- Amazing Grace, Peacock Abbey Theatre, 1998
- Bog Dances, Steve Wickham and Shake the Spear Theatre @ Dunamaise Arts Centre, 2000
- Sleeping a Lovesong, Project Arts Centre, 2002
- Talking Through His Hat, Dublin Fringe Festival @ The Focus, 2002
- Swallow, Gare St Lazare Players @ Dublin Fringe Festival, 2003
- Birdie Birdie, for Blue Raincoat Theatre, 2004
- Tearmann for Siamsa Tire, The National Folk Theatre of Ireland, 2006
- The Tinker's Curse, Livin' Dred Theatre Company, 2007.
- Is There Balm in Gilead? Pavilion Theatre Dublin, 2007

=== Other ===
- Staring at Lakes (winner of the Bord Gais Energy Book of the Year Award
- Hanging with the Elephant
- Talking with Strangers
- On Tuesdays I'm a Buddhist (2017)
- Chest Pain, A man, a stent and camper van (2019)
- The lights go out on another solitary country life (2014 essay) read aloud by Michael Harding in the film One By One, the Lights Go Out (2024)

== Awards ==
- 1989 - shortlisted for the Irish Times Aer Lingus Literature Award
- 1990 - Stewart Parker Trust Award for Theatre
- 1990 - Bank of Ireland RTÉ award for excellence in the arts
- 1980 - Hennessy Literary Award for short stories
- 2004 - Best Actor, Dublin Fringe Festival for his performance in Gare St Lazare's production of Swallow.
- 2006 - Nominated Best Actor in a Supporting Role – British Theatre Management Awards
- 2007 - The Tinker's Curse, nominated for Best New Play at the Irish Times Irish Theatre Awards
- 2013 - Staring at Lakes, Non-Fiction Book of the Year Irish Book Awards
- 2000 - Member, Aosdána, Irish National Academy for Creative Artists
