= Liz Nugent =

Irish writer

Liz Nugent (born 1967 in Dublin, Ireland) is an Irish novelist. She is the author of six novels. Her latest novel is The Truth About Ruby Cooper, published in the Ireland and UK in March 2026.

== Biography ==
Liz Nugent attended Holy Child Killiney, in County Dublin. At the age of six she suffered a brain injury which left her with dystonia. After leaving school she moved to London for a time.

After her return to Ireland, she enrolled in an acting course at the Gaiety School of Acting but soon switched to stage management. She toured the world with Riverdance as a stage manager and later worked in an administrative role in RTÉ on its flagship soap Fair City.

During her time at RTÉ, she was commissioned to write an animation series for Irish language TV station TG4 and also wrote a full-length radio play for RTÉ Radio. She subsequently won a European Broadcasting Union competition for a TV pilot.

Her first novel began life as a short story called Alice which made the shortlist of the RTÉ Francis McManus Short Story Competition in 2006. Further exploration into the main character produced her first best-selling novel Unravelling Oliver. She is published by Penguin Sandycove in Ireland and the UK, and by Scout Press (Simon & Schuster) in the US.

== Bibliography ==
- Unravelling Oliver (2014)
- Lying In Wait (2016)
- Skin Deep (2018)
- Our Little Cruelties (2020) (as Little Cruelties in United States)
- Strange Sally Diamond (2023)
- The Truth About Ruby Cooper (2026)

== Recognition ==
Unravelling Oliver

- Winner: Ireland AM Crime Fiction Award at the Bord Gáis Irish Book Awards in 2014
- Longlist: Dublin International Literary Award (formerly the IMPAC) 2016

Lying In Wait

- Winner: Ryan Tubridy Listeners' Choice Award - Irish Book Awards 2016
- Longlist: Dublin International Literary Award 2018

Skin Deep

- Winner of two An Post Irish Book Awards 2018: Irish Independent Crime Fiction Book of the Year and RTÉ Radio 1's The Ryan Tubridy Show Listeners’ Choice Award
- Longlist: Dublin International Literary Award 2020
- "Cancel All Plans for the Book You Can't Put Down Award" - Dead Good Books at the Harrogate Theakston's Old Peculier Crime Writing Festival in 2019

Our Little Cruelties

- Nominated for 'Crime Novel of the Year' at the 2020 An Post Irish Book Awards
- Listed by the New York Times as one of 7 recommended thrillers of 2020

Strange Sally Diamond

- Winner of 'Crime Novel of the Year' at the An Post Irish Book Awards in 2023
- Second best-selling book of 2023 in Ireland behind Booker Prize winner 'Prophet Song' by Paul Lynch
- Longlisted for the 'Theakstons Old Peculier Crime Novel of the Year' by Harrogate Festivals
- Featured on BBC's Between the Covers sixth season

=== Other awards and bursaries ===
In 2016, Nugent was awarded the Ireland Funds Monaco Bursary to be the Writer-in-Residence at The Princess Grace Irish Library in Monaco and was also Writer-In-Residence in the Centre Culturel Irlandais in Paris in April 2019.

She was awarded the Woman of the Year Award for Literature 2017.

In February 2021, she was awarded the James Joyce Award by the Literary & Historical Society of University College Dublin.

Liz was awarded the Goss.ie 'Writer of the Year' at the Women of the Year Awards October 2023.
