= Katriona O'Sullivan =

British author and psychologist

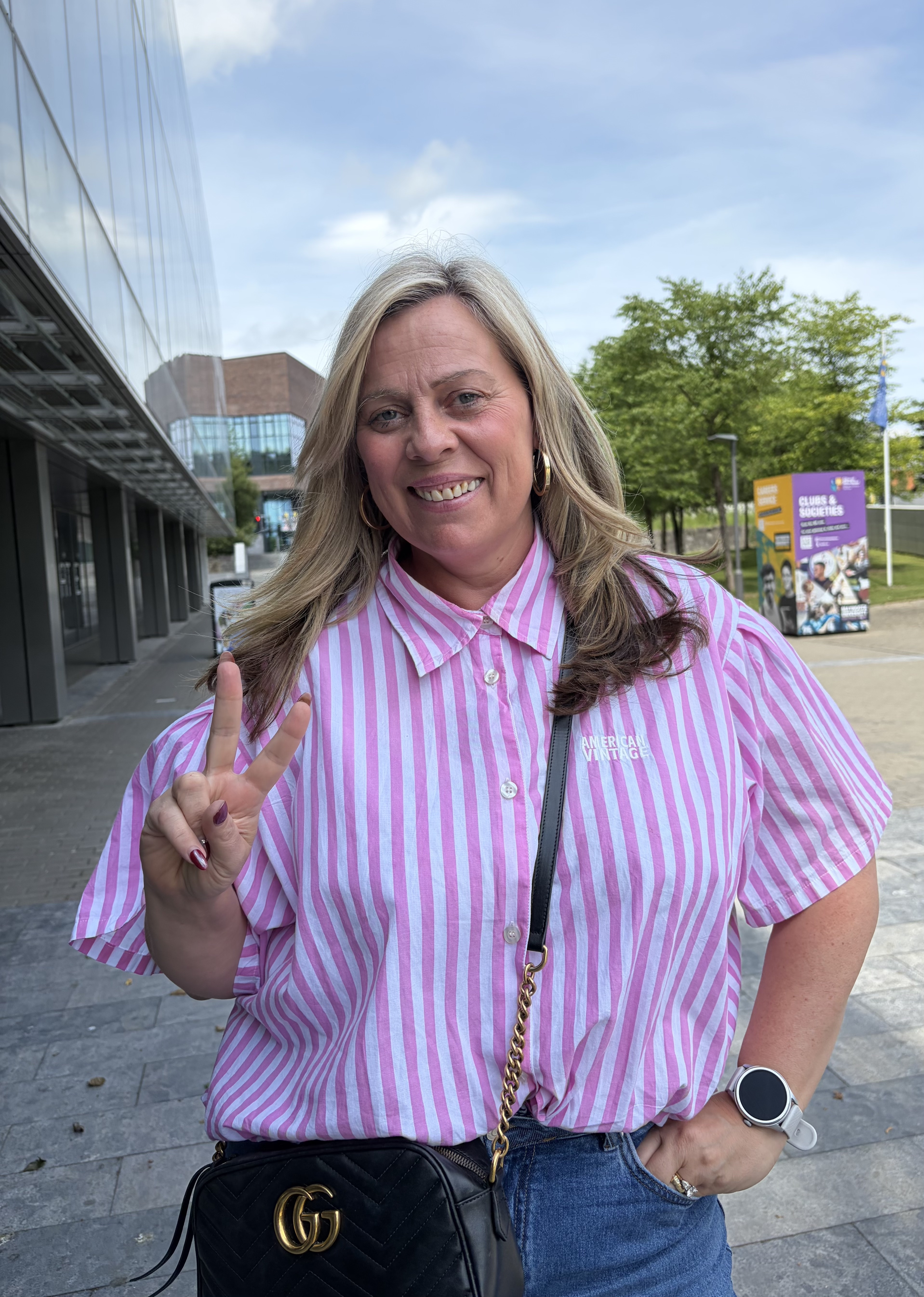
- Born: Coventry, West Midlands
- Employer(s): Maynooth University, Ireland

Academic background
- Education: Trinity College, Dublin (B.A., PhD).
- Thesis: An investigation of implicit and explicit 'liking' and 'wanting' processes in nicotine addiction (2012)
- Doctoral advisor: Michael Gormley

Katriona O'Sullivan is a psychologist and writer. Her autobiographical memoirs Poor (2023) and Hungry (2026) document the challenges of her early life, and her story of how she overcame them.

== Life and career ==
O'Sullivan was born in Coventry, West Midlands, in the late 1970s. She was the middle child of five, born in poverty to Irish parents. Aged 15, O'Sullivan became pregnant, and homeless. O'Sullivan moved to Ireland in 1998, and later entered Trinity College, Dublin, on an access programme. She subsequently completed an undergraduate degree in psychology, and then went on to do a PhD. O'Sullivan works as a lecturer at Maynooth University, where she leads the National Centre for Inclusive Higher Education.

In 2023, O'Sullivan published an autobiographical memoir, Poor. This documented how she overcome the challenges of poverty and homelessness, and built a new life as a student and then lecturer in psychology. Poor was chosen as the An Post biography of the year at the Irish Book Awards, and remained in the Irish bestsellers lists for over three years.

A play, based on O'Sullivan's memoir, premiered at the Gate theatre Ireland during Dublin theater festival 2025 and was in Coventry at the Belgrade Theatre in May 2026.

In 2026, O'Sullivan published a second memoir, Hungry. On 4 July 2026, O'Sullivan was a guest of Adrian Chiles on the BBC Radio 4 magazine programme Saturday Live, where she talked about her life, her academic work and her writings.

=== Books ===
- O'Sullivan, Katriona (2023). Poor. Sandycore, Dublin. p. 320. ISBN 9781844886227.
- O'Sullivan, Katriona (2026). Hungry: a biography of my body. Wildfire, London. p. 368. ISBN 9781035427772.

== Family life ==
O'Sullivan has three children. Her eldest, John O'Sullivan played professional football in the UK and Ireland.
