= Ballyfermot College of Further Education =

College in Dublin, Ireland

Coordinates: 53.34067°N 6.352449°W

- Coláiste Breisoideachais Bhaile Formaid
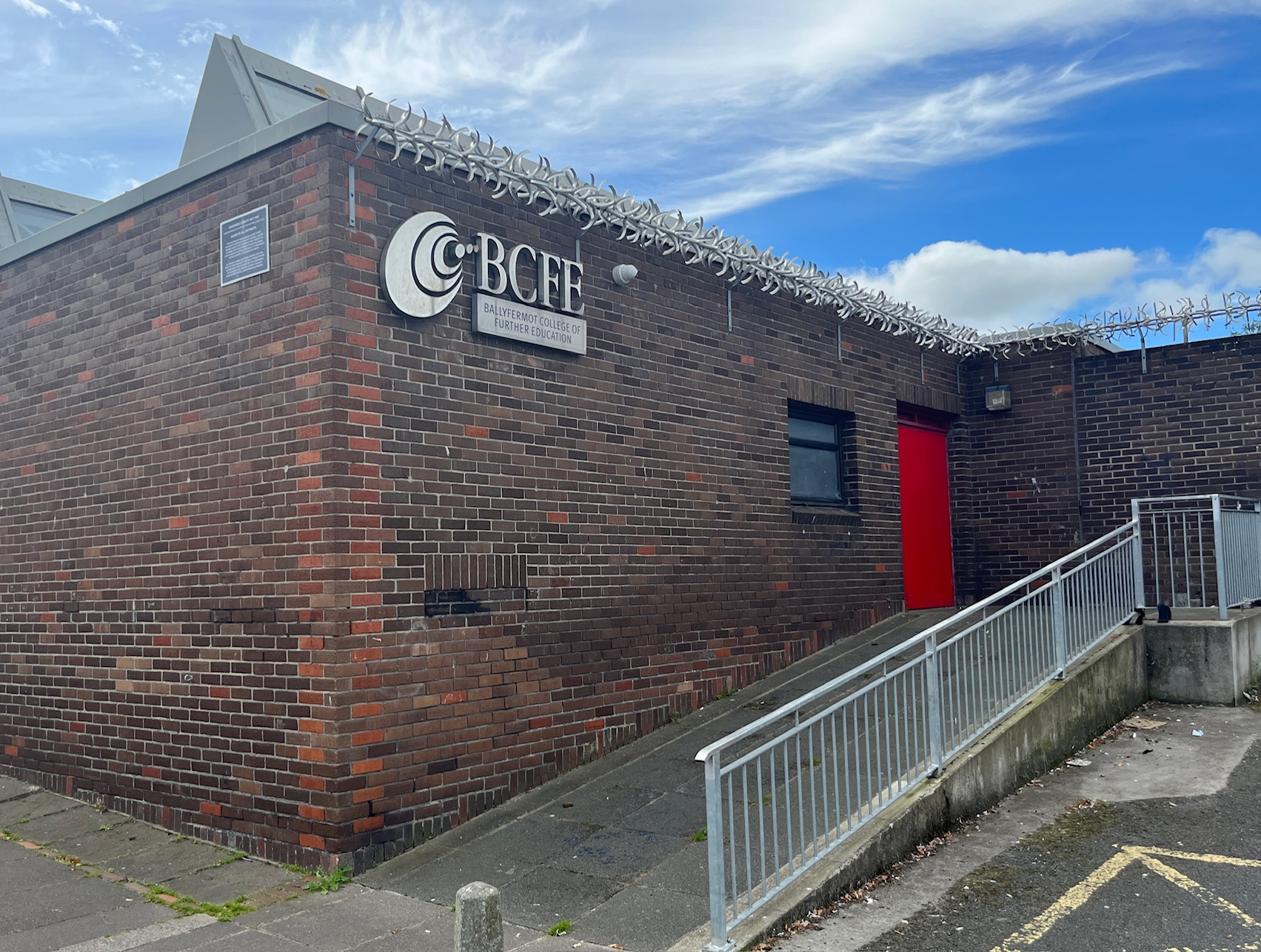
- Former names: Ballyfermot Senior College
- Type: Vocational (CDETB)
- Established: 1979
- Principal: Cecilia Munro
- Location: Ballyfermot, Dublin 10, Ireland
- Website: www.bcfe.ie

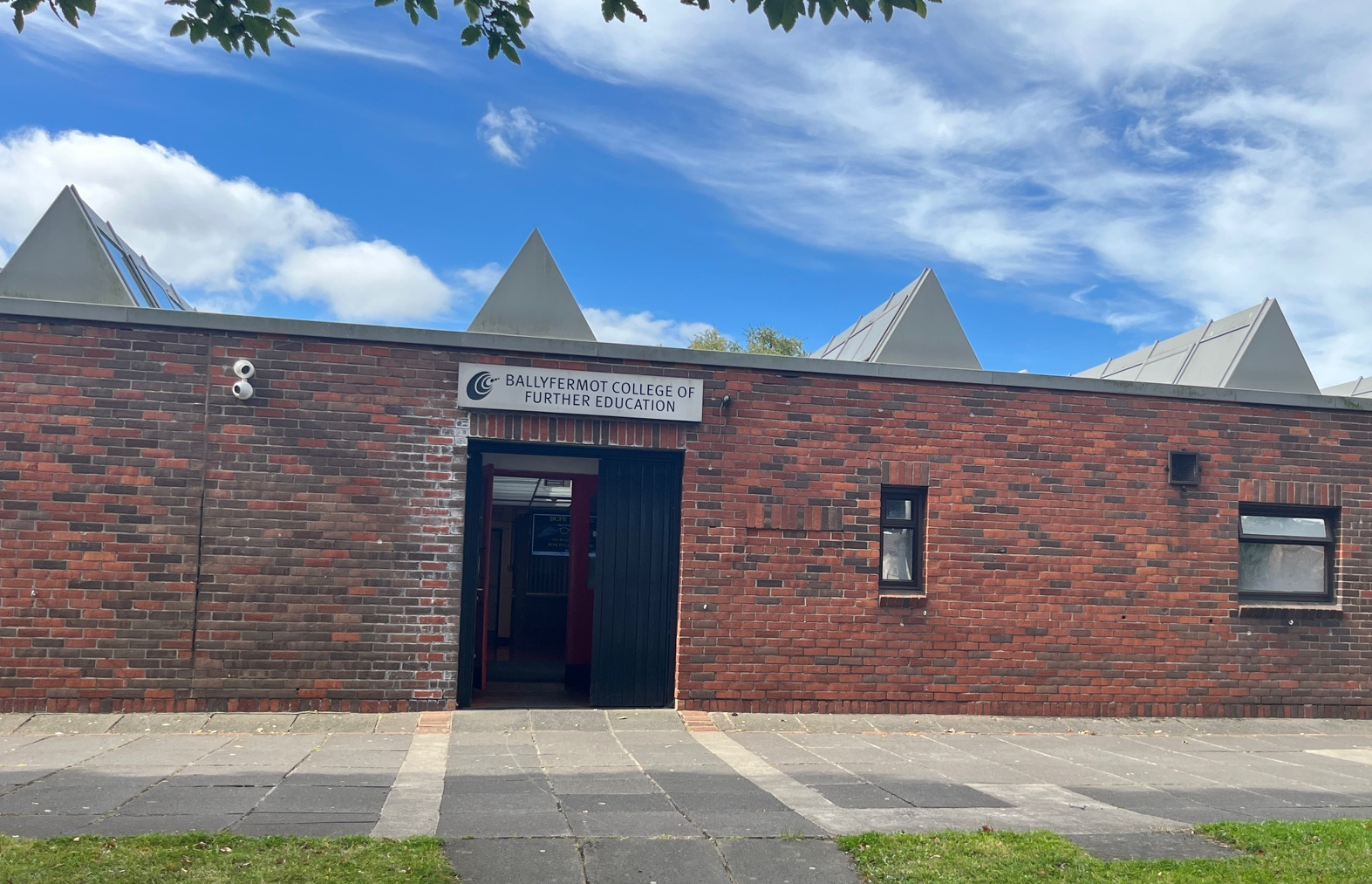
Ballyfermot College of Further Education - main building - general entrance

Ballyfermot College of Further Education (BCFE; Irish: Coláiste Breisoideachais Bhaile Formaid) is an educational institution in Ballyfermot, Dublin, Ireland, a college of further and higher education.

== Management ==
Ballyfermot College of Further Education is managed by the City of Dublin Educational and Training Board (CDETB) with a local Board of Management representative of the community and special interests, industry, services and commerce, and students and staff. The CDETB is the statutory agency for vocational and technological education for the City of Dublin. It manages 21 schools and colleges, which cater for 11,000 students.

As of 2021, Ms Cecilia Munro was the principal of the college and the deputy principals were Ms Jacqueline Moloney, Dr Denis Murray and Mr Kenneth Rea.

== History ==
The college opened in 1979 as the Senior College Ballyfermot Sr. Dr. Margaret Mac Curtain OP was its founding principal. Since then the college has worked with a range of educational and industrial partners to develop and offer courses in further and higher education. The college caters for students from the age of 17 and upwards. The college offers a choice of 39 courses of Further and Higher Education in 9 departmental.

=== Senior College Ballyfermot (SCB) ===
The Senior College opened in September 1979 to provide the Leaving Certificate to students from Ballyfermot. After consultation with local secondary schools, it was decided that students from three of the local schools, Ballyfermot Vocational School, Caritas and St Dominic's, would complete their Leaving Certificate exams in the Senior College.

The new college also offered secretarial courses to post Leaving and post-Intermediate Certificate students, as well as pre-employment courses for post-Intermediate students.

During the 1980s a range of post-Leaving Cert. courses was introduced into the college, including Preliminary Engineering which had links with Dublin Institute of Technology Bolton Street, Hotel Catering and Tourism courses which had links with CERT, business courses and social care courses. Most of these courses continue today. In the 1990s the Senior College gave up its Leaving Certificate classes, which returned to the local schools and continued to develop Post-Leaving Certificate courses.

In 2000 the Senior College changed its name to Ballyfermot College of Further Education (BCFE).

== Departments ==
Within BCFE there are several Departments: Art, Design and Graphics, Moving Images, Business, Engineering, Lifelong Learning, Media, Music, Performance, Management and Sound, Social Care, Television and Film, Travel, Tourism and Reception. The college delivers two degrees, one in Media Production Management (accredited by Dublin City University) and one in Animation (validated by Dundee University), and a number of BTEC Higher National Diplomas and QQI Level 5 courses.

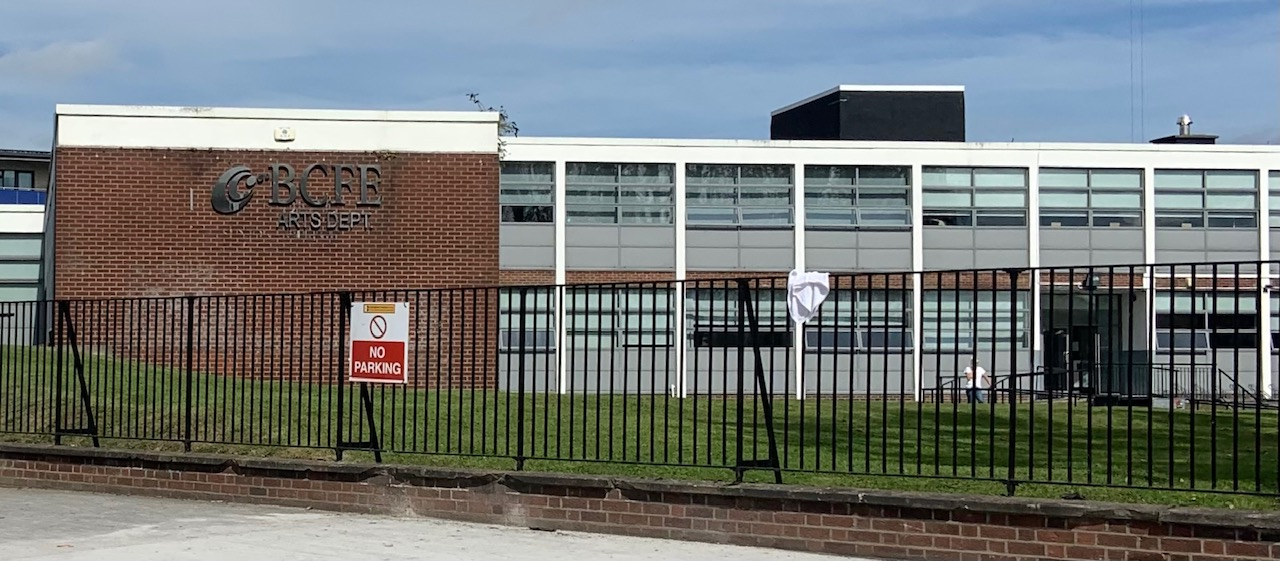
Ballyfermot College of Further Education - Arts Dept, Kylemore Road

== Buildings ==
There are 3 separate buildings within BCFE college. The Main Building and Media Building are side by side, to the left of Ballyfermot Road if coming from the city centre direction. The Arts building is located a short distance away on Kylemore Road.

== Alumni ==
- Sara Baume, novelist
- Richard Baneham, Academy Award winning animator
- Wallis Bird, singer songwriter
- Lucy Blue (musician), singer songwriter
- Sarah Breen, author
- Junior Brother, musician
- Damien Dempsey, singer songwriter
- Daoiri Farrell, Irish folk musician
- Eileen Flynn, member of the 26th Seanad
- Cathal Gaffney, founder of Brown Bag Films
- Mickey Joe Harte, singer songwriter, Eurovision performer
- Riyadh Khalaf, Celebrity Masterchef winner 2020, YouTube influencer
- Imelda May, singer, songwriter, television presenter
- Emer McLysaght, journalist and author
- Tomm Moore, co-founder of Cartoon Saloon
- Mundy, singer songwriter
- Daragh O'Connell, founder of Brown Bag Films
- Aidan Power, television and radio presenter
- Mairead Ronan, television and radio presenter
- Nora Twomey, co-founder of Cartoon Saloon
- Paul Young, co-founder and CEO of Cartoon Saloon
