= Sinead Moriarty =

Irish writer

- Born: c. 1971; Dublin, Ireland
- Occupation: Writer
- Writing career
- Pen name: Sinead Moriarty
- Genres: contemporary family dramas and children's books

Sinead Moriarty (born c. 1971) is an Irish writer of contemporary family dramas and children's books.

== Life and work ==
The third of three children, Moriarty was born in Booterstown, Dublin to Aidan and Mary Moriarty about 1971. Her mother was a writer on Irish historical figures like Swift, Yeats, Joyce. Moriarty was educated in Trinity College in Dublin where she did a Bachelor of Arts in French and Spanish. After university she moved to Paris and then London, working as a journalist. When she was in London she began to write fiction and her first novel was published by Penguin Books. Since then she has moved back to Dublin with her husband, and they have three children. She also writes a column for the Irish Independent.

Moriarty was appointed a member of the Arts Council of Ireland in July 2018 where she served for three years. She created the podcast What's in the Water? which she co-hosted with author Anna McPartlin to promote and highlight the wealth of talented female Irish writers. She wrote a weekly column for the Irish Independent for seven years. She was the books ambassador for Eason bookshops' Must Reads for six years.

== Awards ==
- 2015 The Way We Were won The Irish Independent Popular Fiction Book of the Year
- 2021 The New Girl was named Irish Book Awards' Teen and Young Adult Book of the Year

== Bibliography ==
- Good Sisters
- About Us
- Yours, Mine, Ours
- The Good Mother
- Seven Letters
- Our Secrets and Lies
- The Good Mother
- The Way We Were
- The Secrets Sisters Keep
- Mad About You
- This Child of Mine
- Me and My Sisters
- Pieces of My Heart
- Whose Life is it Anyway
- In My Sister’s Shoes
- From Here to Maternity
- A Perfect Match
- The Baby Trail

Children's Books

- The New Girl
- The Truth About Riley
- Finding Hope
- Fixing Mum & Dad
