= Sheila O'Flanagan =

Irish writer and journalist (born 1958)

Sheila O'Flanagan (born 1958 in Dublin) is an Irish fiction writer and journalist who writes for The Irish Times.

== Biography ==
O'Flanagan began her career in financial services at the Central Bank of Ireland. During her tenure, she was promoted to chief dealer, trading foreign currency, bonds, and options. She wrote her first book in her thirties. Dreaming of a Stranger was published in 1997. She was offered a contract with an Irish publisher and gave up her job in financial trading.

She is a competitive badminton player in Ireland and has served on the Irish Sports Council Board.

In 2011, she received the Irish Popular Fiction Book of the Year Award for All for You.

== Publications ==
- Suddenly Single (1999)
- Isobel's Wedding (1999)
- Far from Over (2000)
- My Favourite Goodbye (2001)
- He's Got to Go (2002)
- Caroline's Sister (2002)
- Too Good to Be True (2003)
- Dreaming of a Stranger (2003)
- Anyone But Him (2004)
- How Will I Know? (2005)
- Yours, Faithfully (2006)
- Bad Behaviour (2007)
- Three's a Crowd (2008)
- Someone Special (2008)
- The Perfect Man (2009)
- Stand by Me (2010)
- All for You (2011)
- Things We Never Say (2013)
- If you were Me (2014)
- My Mother′s Secret (2015)
- The Crystal Run (2016)
- The Missing Wife (2016)
- What Happened That Night (2017)
- The Hideaway (2018)
- The Moment We Meet (2018)
- The Season of Change (2019)
- Her Husband's Mistake (2019)
- The Women Who Ran Away (2020)
- Three Weddings and a Proposal (2021)
- What Eden Did Next (2022)
