= Sarah Breen =

Irish journalist

- Born: 1982 (age 43–44)
- Education: Ballyfermot College of Further Education
- Occupations: Author; journalist

Sarah Breen is an Irish journalist and co-author of the Aisling series of novels.

== Background ==
Breen is from Borris, County Carlow. After leaving secondary school in 2000, she studied languages at Dublin City University for a year. In 2003, she began media studies at Ballyfermot College of Further Education where she met her friend and future co-author Emer McLysaght. Breen lives in Dublin 7 with her husband and 3 children.

== Career ==
Breen was editor of Kiss magazine from 2005 to 2010. From 2010 to 2014, she worked as a freelance journalist and editor in the United States for Image magazine, Pressparty, the Irish Independent, The Herald, and The Irish Times. She was appointed deputy editor at Stellar magazine in 2014 and was assistant editor at The Gloss magazine from 2015 to 2018. She has been a full-time author since 2018.

== Aisling novels ==
McLysaght and Breen co-created a comedic character named Aisling, establishing a Facebook fan group which grew to more than 45,000 members. As Aisling gained in popularity they were approached by publishers and decided to write a novel. As of 2021, the series consists of four books, with a further final book planned. The first three books were bestsellers and sold over 300,000 copies. They are published by Gill Books and Penguin Books.

== Awards ==
- 2019 Irish Book Awards Popular Fiction Book of the Year - Once, Twice, Three Times an Aisling
- 2018 Irish Book Awards Popular Fiction Book of the Year - The Importance of Being Aisling

== Bibliography ==
- Our Deadly Summer (2026)
- Aisling Ever After (2024)
- Aisling and The City (2021)
- Once, Twice, Three Times An Aisling (2019)
- The Importance of Being Aisling (2019)
- Oh My God, What a Complete Aisling (2017)
