= Sinéad Gleeson =

Irish author and artist

- Born: 1974; Dublin, Ireland
- Education: University College Dublin
- Occupations: Author, broadcaster, journalist, artist
- Children: 2

Sinéad Gleeson is an Irish writer. Her essay collection, Constellations: Reflections from Life, won Non-Fiction Book of the Year at 2019 Irish Book Awards and the Dalkey Literary Award for Emerging Writer.

== Early life and education ==
Gleeson was born and grew up in Dublin. She went on to study English and History and University College Dublin.

== Career ==
=== Writing ===
As editor of The Long Gaze Back: An Anthology of Irish Women Writers, the book won Best Irish Published Book of the Year in 2015 at the Irish Book Awards. Also in 2016, Gleeson was editor of The Glass Shore: Short Stories by Women Writers from the North of Ireland which won the 2016 TheJournal.ie Best Irish Published Book of the Year.

In 2019, Gleeson was "Arts Council Writing Fellow in residence" at University College Dublin.

Gleeson is co-editor with Kim Gordon of This Woman’s Work: Essays on Music, published by Hachette Books in 2022.

Constellations: Reflections from Life was shortlisted for the Rathbones Folio Prize and the James Tait Black Memorial Prize. It was published in the US by Mariner Books and translated into several languages. The Glass Shore: Short Stories by Women Writers from the North of Ireland and The Art of Glimpse: 100 Irish Short Stories.

Her debut novel, Hagstone was published by 4th Estate in April 2024. In 2025 the novel made longlist for the International Dublin Literary Award.

=== Broadcasting ===
Gleeson has been a presenter on the RTE Radio 1 programme The Book Show.

=== Art ===
Gleeson has also engaged in multi-disciplinary collaborations with artists and musicians, including commissions from City Gallery Wellington, The Wellcome Collection, BBC and Frieze. In 2021, she collaborated with composer Stephen Shannon and artist Aideen Barry on an installation, By Slight Ligaments, for the Limerick City Gallery and artists Alice Maher and Rachel Fallon on another installation, The Map / We Are The Map, for the Rua Red.

=== Personal life ===
As of 2022 Gleeson was living in Dublin with her composer husband Stephen Shannon with whom she has two children.

== Works ==
=== Author ===
- Constellations, Picador Books, 2019 Essay collection ISBN 1-5098-9274-5 Houghton Mifflin March 2020 in USA
- Hagstone 4th Estate Books, 2024, ISBN 978-0-00-862664-8

=== Editor ===
- Silver Threads of Hope, New Island Books, 2012 ISBN 1-84840-181-7, in aid of Console
- The Long Gaze Back: An Anthology of Irish Women Writers, New Island Books, 2016 ISBN 1-84840-548-0
- The Glass Shore: Short Stories by Woman Writers from the North of Ireland ISBN 1-84840-557-X,
- The Art of the Glimpse: 100 Irish Short Stories, 2020 ISBN 978-1-78854-880-9
- This Woman's Work: Essays on Music, Hachette Books, 2022, ISBN 978-0-306-82900-0 (with Kim Gordon)

=== Contributor ===
- A Little Unsteadily Into Light (2022, New Island Books)
