= James McKenna (artist) =

Irish artist and dramatist (1933–2000)

- Born: June 1933; Dublin, Ireland
- Died: 10 October 2000 (aged 67); County Kildare, Ireland
- Burial place: Kilbelan (St. Conleth's) Cemetery, Newbridge, County Kildare
- Education: National College of Art and Design
- Known for: sculpture
- Style: Figurative sculpture
- Elected: Aosdána (1983)

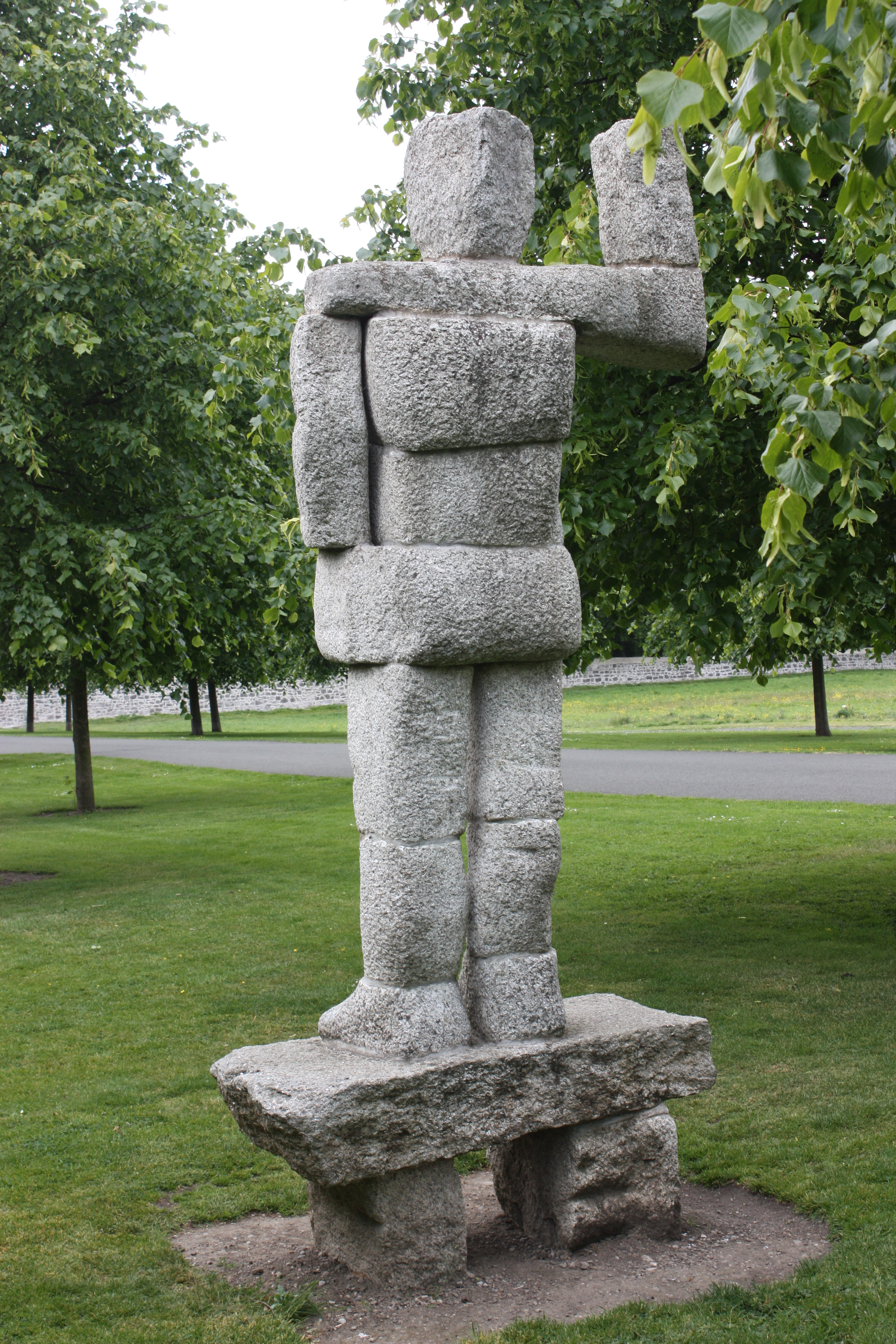
Ferdia at the Ford by McKenna (Irish Museum of Modern Art)

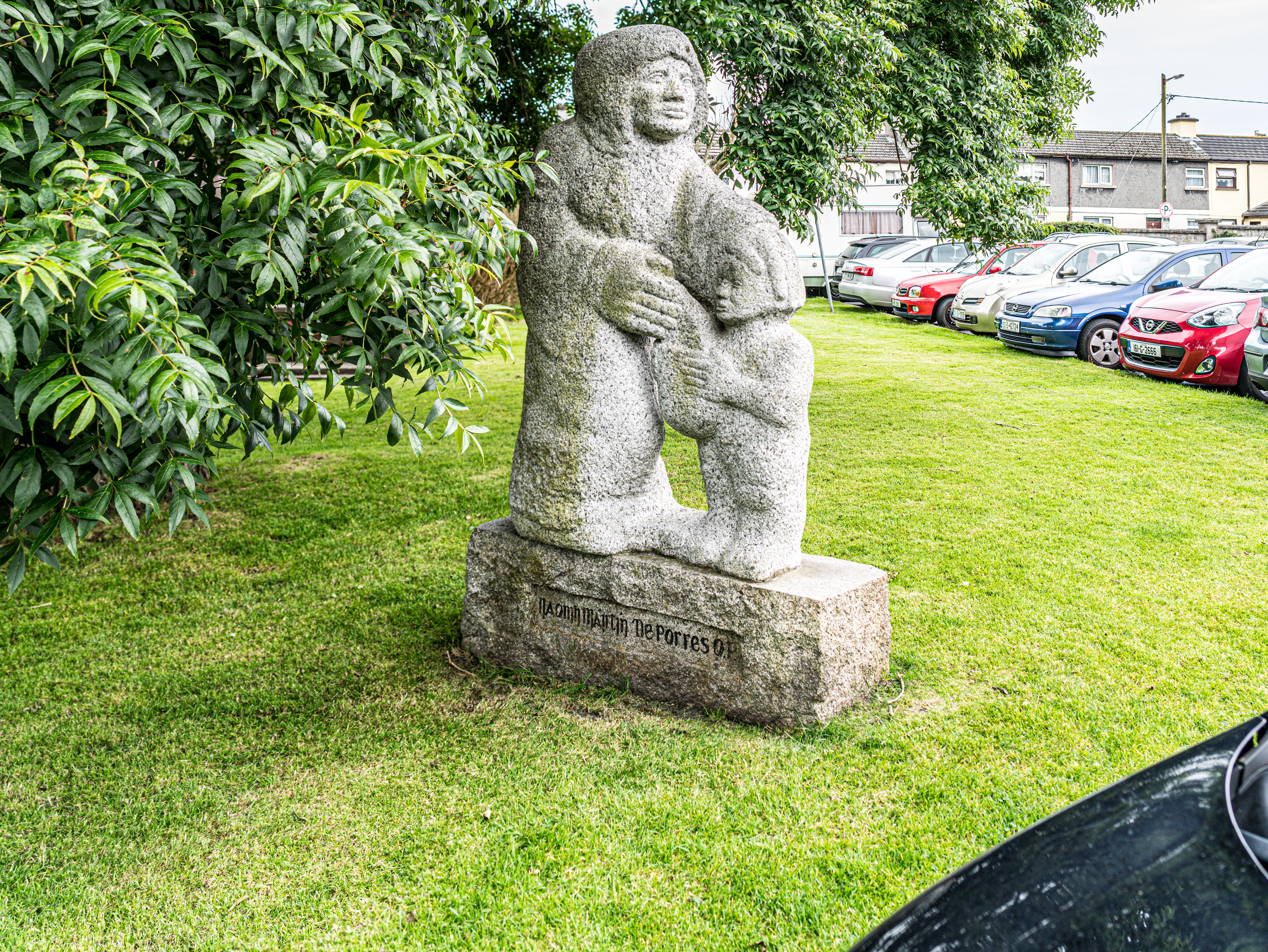
St Martin de Porres by McKenna (Claddagh Quay, Galway)

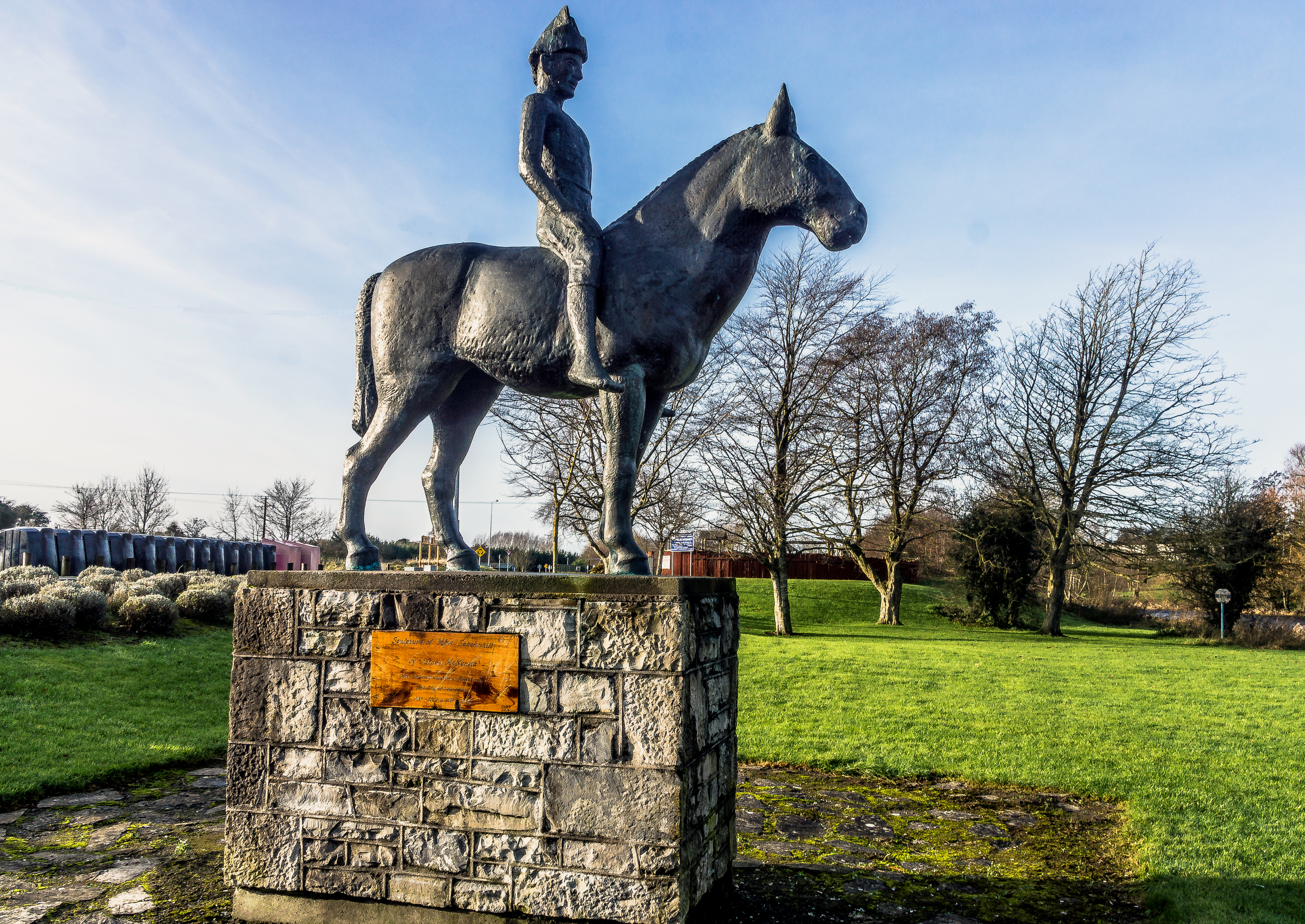
Sculpture of the medieval king Máel Sechnaill mac Domnaill in Trim, County Meath.

James McKenna (21 June 1933 – 10 October 2000) was an Irish sculptor, poet, dramatist and artist.

== Early life ==
McKenna grew up on a farm near Killincarrig, County Wicklow and attended Bray Technical School.

== Career ==
McKenna studied at the National College of Art and Design. He was influenced by Oliver Sheppard. He graduated NCAD in 1955 and spent time in Italy, but struggled to find work in Ireland, going to England to work in tunnelling for the London Underground, where he lived with fellow artist Brian Bourke. He exhibited work with the Irish Exhibition of Living Art in 1957 and in 1958 with the Sculptors' Institute Exhibition. In 1960 he was a founder member of Independent Artists. In 1983 he was elected to Aosdána.

=== Writing ===
McKenna's first play was The Scatterin' (1959), about Irish emigration. In 1969 he set up the Rising Ground Drama Group. Overall, he wrote a dozen plays, and a book of poetry in 1974.

=== Sculpture ===
According to Aidan Dunne, McKenna was "a figurative sculptor with an ambitious inclination towards monumental scale and grand statements. He was also a politically engaged, at times obdurate presence in the cultural landscape of his time. Fiercely idealistic, he believed implicitly in art's transformative social mission." He said that, "McKenna's figures can possess an elegance of line, but it is certainly not one of their defining characteristics. They are closer to the influence of the Gothic evident in the figures of German sculptor Wilhelm Lehmbrück than they are to Rodin. More often than not, they are rooted and heavy, corporeal creatures of mass who feel the pull of gravity and test themselves against it."

He was a founder of the Sculptors’ Society of Ireland in 1980.

=== Politics ===
He stood in the 1977 general election with the slogan "Art for the People;" he was on the ballot in Dublin Ballyfermot but only managed 74 votes.

== Personal life ==
McKenna lived in Geraldine Square Dublin 8, Chapelizod and Newbridge, County Kildare.

He died in 2000.
