= Darragh McCullough =

Irish journalist

Darragh McCullough (born 1977) is an Irish journalist, broadcaster and farmer specialising in agricultural and rural affairs. He has worked for RTÉ, the Irish Farmers Journal, and Independent News and Media. He is the longest serving presenter on RTÉ television's Ear to the Ground programme, and was the deputy editor of the Irish Independent newspaper's Farming supplement.

== Career ==
After graduating in 1999, McCullough worked on RTÉ Radio 1's farming news programmes, before moving in 2001 to television to present the farming, food and rural affairs programme, Ear to the Ground. At the same time he started working with the Irish Farmers Journal, where he wrote a weekly column, Darragh's Diary. In 2010 he switched to the Irish Independent newspaper's farming section. In 2014, he shared the best television award from the International Federation of Agricultural Journalists with his producer, Paula Williams for their Ear to the Ground story on Limerick farmer, Seamus Sherlock's battle to save his farm from repossession by the banks.
