= Alex Sadkowsky =

Swiss artist (1934–2025)

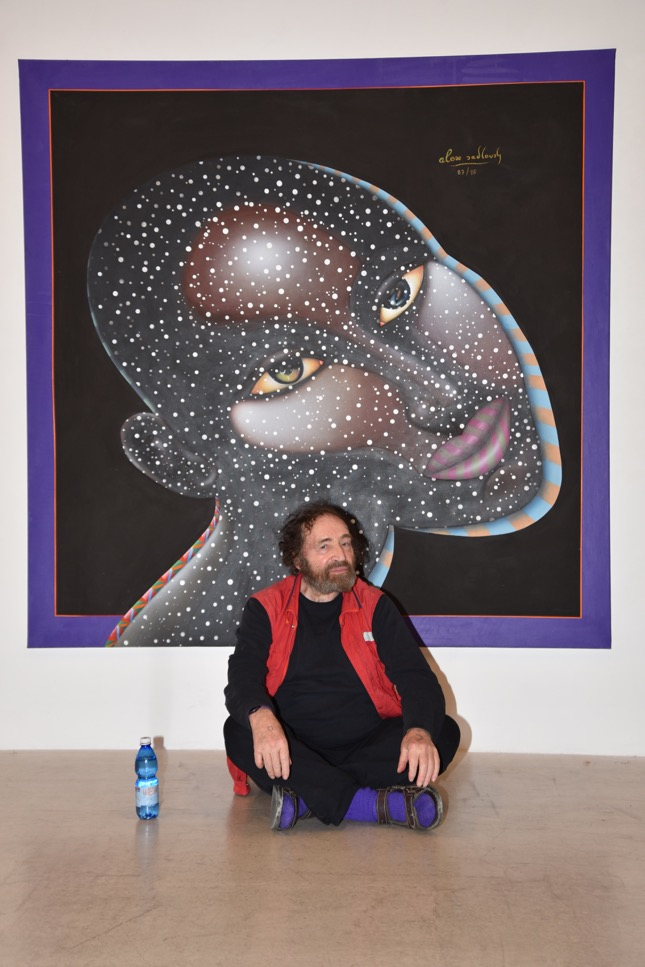
- Alex Sadkowsky in the 1990s
- Born: 16 January 1934; Zürich, Switzerland
- Died: 8 February 2025 (aged 91)
- Known for: Painting, illustration, graphic art, photography, performance art, writing
- Website: https://www.alex-sadkowsky.com/

Alex Sadkowsky (16 January 1934 – 8 February 2025) was a Swiss multi-media artist, painter, illustrator, graphic artist, photographer, performer and author.

== Early life ==
Alex Sadkowsky was born in Zürich, Switzerland. His mother was an artist, as was his brother. His father was a portraitist and restorer in Vienna, Zürich and Salzburg, like his mother before him. As a young adult, Sadkowsky engaged in various occupations, including being a jazz musician, a traveling salesman, a Spanish teacher, a tap-dancer, an exterior painter, and a brief time as a boxer.

== Artistic career ==
His life included a diverse range of exhibitions, experiences and publications of his writings.

He was a most prolific author, painter, graphic artist and performer.

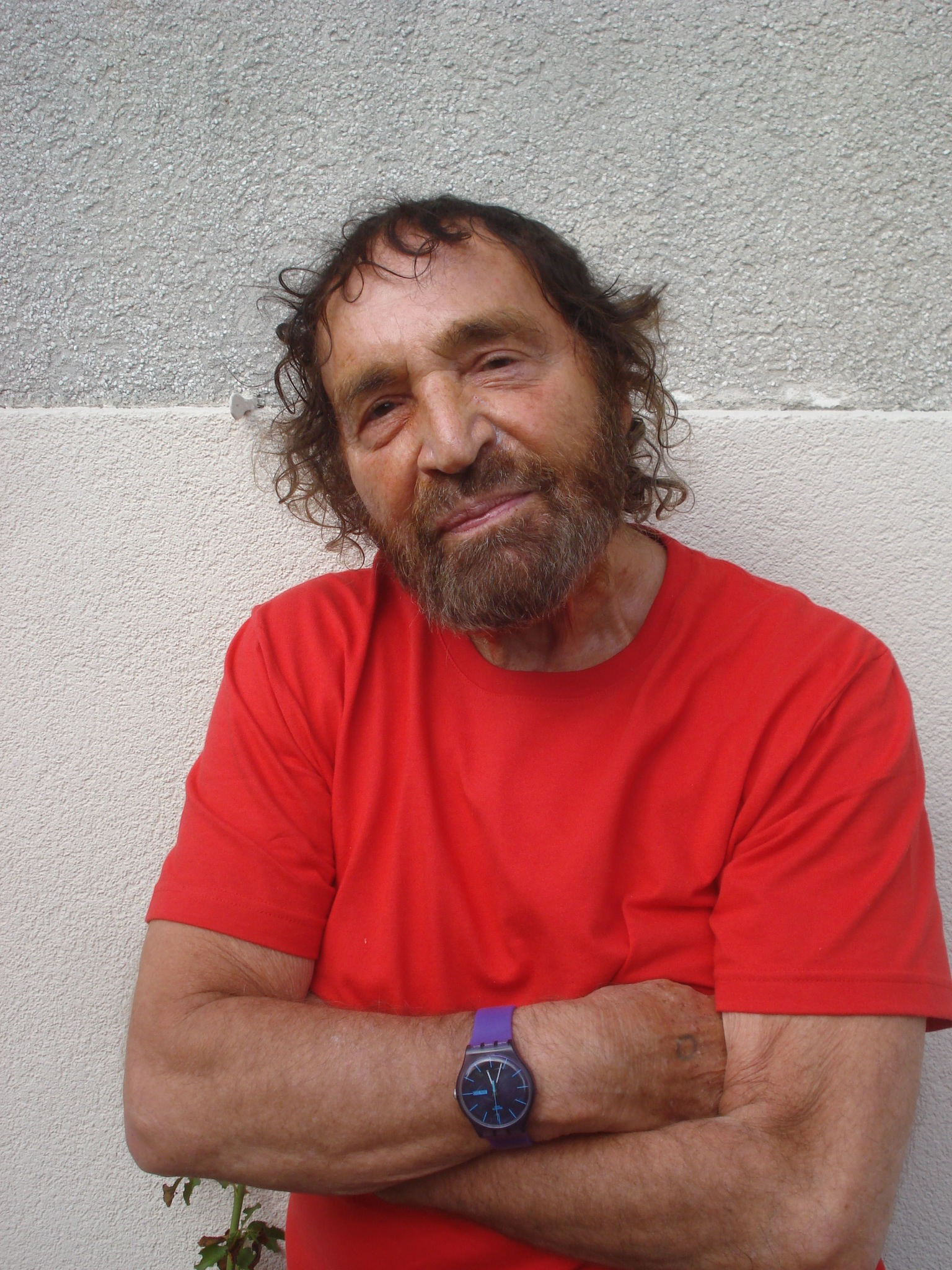
Sadkowsky in 2017

In 1986, Alex Sadkowsky emphasized that "I paint not only against the death, but for life."

== Biography ==
In 1946, he wrote a series of short poems and made a number of paintings. He attended drawing lessons taught by Walter Jonas and Charles Kissling.

He married Sonja Blattmann in 1957. The couple would eventually have one daughter and three sons. In the same year, Sadkowsky spent six months in Spain. While there, he was a student at the Academie de Bellas Artes at Valencia.

During 1958 he worked as a freelance artist, sharing an atelier with the artist Friedrich Kuhn.

In 1960, he made several trips to India, where he studied Buddhism in Darbanga and Darjeeling.

In 1961, he traveled to Venice, Italy.

In 1963, while staying in London, UK, he met with Francis Bacon. The same year, he visited Ireland for the first time. He would visit the country 70 times. He co-founded Group 65. During his time in Dublin, he began work on the novel Die Chinesische Wespe – Geschichte einer Liebe (The Chinese Wasp — Story of a Love).

In 1965, he released three short films: Kaninchenleben (Rabbit life), Der Blinde (The Blind Person) and Wieviel Erde braucht der Mensch? (How Much Earth Does Man Need?).

In 1966, he travelled to Russia with Max Frisch, Tankred Dorst and Marianne Oehlers.

In 1970, Stedelijk Museum give Sadkowsky an atelier. There, he devised works about the "Animal metaphysicum". In that year he also travelled to Mexico and Guatemala.

In 1972, he travelled to Greece. That year he was featured in solo exhibitions in museums in Turku and Tampere.

In 1973, he travelled to the Balkans and stayed in Istanbul.

While living in Zürich in 1977, he held a solo exhibition in the Taylor Gallery in Dublin.

In 1983, he created several new paintings, drawings and sculptures under the title Kommunikation in Wolle (Communication in Wool).

In 1984, he completed writing the novel Die gelbe Frau oder Schriftsymbiose zweier Blondinen (The Yellow Woman or a Written Symbiosis of Two Blondes).

From 1985 until 1993, he travelled to Italy, Greece, Holland, Spain, Yugoslavia, Portugal, Malta, Mexico, Ireland, France and the USA.

In 1995, he travelled to Hang Dong, Pudoi in Sansai/Chiang Mai, Northern Thailand.

From 1996 until 2006, he received 8 recognition prizes for literature in Switzerland, Canton of Zürich.

In 1998 he completed a new project under the name Neunundneunzig neue Zürcher Märchen (Ninety-nine new Zurich Fairy Tales).

After over 9 years he finished the novel Die Chinesische Wespe – Geschichte einer Liebe (The Chinese Wasp - Story of a Love) in 2008.

In 2005 and 2006, he began writing the novel Die Umwandlung (The Transformation). He also created paintings and sculptures under the title Etymologie - Kolloquium (Etymology - Colloquium).

In his last twenty years there were a number oflonger stays to Hang Dong, Pudoi in Sansai/Chiang Mai, Northern Thailand.

2023 Sadkowsky's last film was completed: "Brushdance."

== Writings ==
- Die Umwandlung. Novella. Publisher: Pudel und Pinscher Verlag Wädenswil 2018, ISBN 978-3-906061-14-6.
- Einziger Lockruf. Poems. Publisher: Howeg-Verlag Zürich 2018, ISBN 978-3-85736-325-2.
- Der Titel II. Ein Titelroman. Collection of various texts. Publisher: Howeg-Verlag Zürich 2014, ISBN 978-3-85736-303-0.
- Lindenhof. Poems and short prose works, Publisher: Littera Autoren-Verlag Zürich 2010, ISBN 978-3-906731-47-6.
- Foto-Bio-Kultografie. Publisher: Scheidegger & Spiess Verlag Zürich 2009, ISBN 978-3-85881-295-7.
- Ich warte auf den ewigen Sommer. Poems. Publisher: Orte-Verlag beregg AI / Zürich 2007, ISBN 978-3-85830-140-6.
- Die Chinesische Wespe. roman. Publisher: Bilger-Verlag Zürich 2002, ISBN 3-908010-58-6.
- Schrittfehler beim Spaziergang durch den einbaumigen Park. Poems. Publisher: Orte-Verlag Zelg/ Wolfhalden/ Zürich 1992, ISBN 3-85830-036-5.
- Die Munterkeit des Galans auf dem Glatteis. Poems. Publisher: Orte-Verlag Zelg/ Wolfhalden/ Zürich 1992, ISBN 3-85830-062-4.
- Der Titel I. Publisher: Lutz-Verlag Zürich 1991, ISBN 3-7212-0640-1.
- Metamorphosen der Wirklichkeit. monograph about AS: Publisher: Hans Heinz Holz ABC Verlag Zürich 1986, ISBN 3-85504-101-6.
- Frauenleben I. Publisher: ABC Verlag Zürich 1980, ISBN 3-85504-101-6.
- Foto-Bio-Kultografie 1. Publisher: Lutz-Verlag Zürich 1975.
- Kofferraum der Welt. Publisher: Niggli-Verlag St. Gallen 1971
- The Song of the Police. Publisher: Jasonya-Verlag Zürich 1962

== Expositions ==
- 2023 Hofkunsthaus Zürich: SADKOWSKY: a Family Affair: with works of Rahel Sadkowsky (daughter) and Ona Sadkowsky (granddaughter).
- 2019 Expositions in Wettingen, Aarau (Switzerland) and Dublin.
- 2015/16 Silver. Teres Wydler. Ruedi Bechtler. Alex Sadkowsky, Kunstzeughaus in Rapperswil (SG).
- 2014 Helmhaus Zürich.
- 1997 Gallery in Tuttlingen.
- 1996 Taylor Galleries in Dublin.
- 1993 "Wer weiss und blau und Geld" House of arts Zürich.
- 1991 Jaski Art Gallery Amsterdam.
- 1986 Gallery Jamileh Weber Zürich.
- 1983 New drawing, paintings and sculptures, Gallery Jamileh Weber Zürich. Release of CD Single Banktrust with Lyrics from Alex Sadkowsky.
- 1982 Galeria Flaviana Locarno.
- 1981 House of arts Glarus, Instituto Aleman in Guadalajara, Museo Santo Domingo in Oaxaca Mexico.
- 1979 Poster campaign "Was lieben Sie am meisten an Zürich? Die letzten drei Buchstaben".
- 1978 Gallery Jamileh Weber on Art '78 Basel.
- 1977 Paintings and drawings created in America/Gallery Jamileh Weber Zürich.
- 1977 America in Europe shows Xerox-pictures in the Nikon Gallery Zürich/Exposition Taylor Galleries Dublin.
- 1975–1976 Retrospective in Gallery Blackbox and in the shopwindow from the art house in Zürich.
- 1972 Museum in Turku, Tampere and Helsinki with movie premiere.
- 1971 Museum for "Allerheiligen Schaffhausen".
- 1970 Exhibition of portraits Eugene Ionesco Theater in Zürich.
- 1969 Double exhibition swimming room Gallery Obere Zäune in Zürich.
- 1969 Gallery Krikhaar Amsterdam.
- 1968 Zürich: Retrospective—Paintings and graphics.
- 1967 Art club: Stuttgart/Gallery Castelnuovo Asc premiere Zürich.
- 1954 Art room "Elsässergasse" Zürich.
