= Maureen Gaffney =

Irish clinical psychologist, broadcaster, writer and columnist

- Born: 1947 (age 78–79); Midleton, County Cork, Ireland

Maureen Gaffney (born 1947) is an Irish clinical psychologist, broadcaster, writer and columnist.

== Biography ==
Gaffney was born in 1947 in Midleton, County Cork. Educated there in St Mary's High School the Presentation Convent, she was the first in her family to go to university and she graduated with a BA in psychology from the University College Cork. Gaffney got a scholarship in 1974 which allowed her to get her masters in Behavioural Sciences from the University of Chicago. She returned to Ireland to gain her PhD from Trinity College Dublin. Gaffney spent twenty years working for the Eastern Health Board before taking on writing columns and beginning a radio career. She was a regular guest on The Gay Byrne Show and in recent years has appeared on both The Marian Finucane Show and the Brendan O'Connor Show.

She has held a number of academic positions. Gaffney has been the Director of the Doctoral Programme in Clinical Psychology in Trinity College Dublin and as adjunct professor of psychology and society in University College Dublin. Gaffney has also held a number of government roles including being a member of the Board of the Health Service Executive and executive chairman of the National Economic and Social Forum. She has also been an advocate of socially progressive causes and has campaigned for a yes vote in the Irish divorce referendum and the marriage equality referendum.

Gaffney is a member of the Women's Leadership Board of Harvard Kennedy School. She is married to John Harris, lives in Dublin and has two children.

In 2021, her book, Your One Wild and Precious Life, won the RTÉ Audience Choice Award at the Irish Book Awards.

She was a candidate in the 2022 Dublin University by-election coming a close second to Dr Tom Clonan.

== Bibliography ==
- Glass Slippers and Tough Bargains (1991)
- The Way We Live Now (1996)
- Flourishing (2011)
- The Complete Life (2018)
- Your One Wild and Precious Life (2019)
