= Peter O'Reilly (cricketer) =

Irish cricketer and sports journalist

Personal information
- Full name: Peter Mark O'Reilly
- Born: 23 July 1964 (age 62); Dublin, Leinster, Ireland
- Batting: Right-handed
- Bowling: Right-arm fast
- Relatives: Lucy O'Reilly (daughter)

Domestic team information
- Years: Team
- 1982–1984: Ireland

Career statistics
Competition	First-class
Matches	2
Runs scored	1
Batting average	1.00
100s/50s	–/–
Top score	1*
Balls bowled	156
Wickets	5
Bowling average	16.20
5 wickets in innings	–
10 wickets in match	–
Best bowling	3/43
Catches/stumpings	–/–
- Source: Cricinfo, 22 October 2018

Peter Mark O'Reilly (born 23 July 1964) is an Irish sports journalist for The Sunday Times, and a former first-class cricketer.

Born at Dublin, O'Reilly was educated in the city at Belvedere College. Aged 18, he made his debut in first-class cricket for Ireland against Scotland at Edinburgh in 1982. He spent 1983 and 1984 in England playing for Warwickshire Second XI, but was unable to force his way into the first eleven. He made a second first-class appearance for Ireland in 1984 against Scotland at Glasgow. A fast bowler, O'Reilly took 5 wickets across his two first-class matches, at an average of 16.20, with best figures of 3/43.

After two seasons in England, O'Reilly returned to Ireland to study Art History and English at University College Dublin. After graduating, he taught English at St. Andrew's College, Dublin. He briefly returned to the Irish side in 1990/91, playing matches against the touring New Zealanders, as well as touring Zimbabwe. Following the death of The Irish Times cricket correspondent Sean Pender, O'Reilly briefly filled the vacant cricket correspondent job at the newspaper. He left teaching in 1996 to become rugby correspondent of Sunday Tribune. He is the current Irish rugby correspondent for The Sunday Times, having joined the paper in 2005. O'Reilly has written books on Irish rugby, including Ireland and the Triple Crown, The Full Bag of Chips, released in 2004, and has collaborated on the autobiographies of Anthony Foley and Johnny Sexton. His daughter, Lucy O'Reilly, played for the Irish women's cricket team.
