= Diarmuid Johnson =

Welsh poet and author (born 1965)

Writer Diarmuid Johnson
- Born: 1965 (age 60–61); Cardiff, Wales
- Writing career
- Language: Welsh
- Genre: Poetry

Writer Diarmuid Johnson (1965) was born in Cardiff (Wales), and brought up in Galway (Ireland). He holds BA, MA and PhD degrees in Celtic Studies. He has published poetry and prose in Irish, Welsh and English, and writes occasionally in other languages, including Breton, French, and German.

== Career ==
Diarmuid Johnson's many books feature the recent 'Sraith na Teamhrach' (The Tara Trilogy). The trilogy is composed of 'Conaire Mór - Seacht nDoras na Cinniúna' (2017), a retelling of the Old Irish epic 'Togail Bruidne Dá Derga'; 'Tuatha Dé Danann - Seilbh Inse Fódla' (2018), a reworking of 'Cath Muighe Tuireadh' and other mythological material; 'Éadaoin - Seacht Snaidhm na Seirce' (2020), a recasting of the great and tragic love story of Éadaoin and Midhir. 'The Tara Trilogy' may be described as a modern compendium of the origin tales of Ireland. 'Conaire Mór' won the Gradam Uí Shúilleabháin 'Book of the Year' award in 2017, while 'Tuatha Dé Danann' won the An Post Irish Book award for best Irish language book of 2018.

Other seminal books by Diarmuid Johnson include 'Pen and Plough - 20th Century Poets and Bards of Ceredigion' (Carreg Gwalch, 2016), being a socio-economic study of the Welsh-speaking world of Ceredigion, West Wales in the mid 20th century, based predominantly on lyric sources.

Collections of poetry from the author's pen include 'Rún na mBradán - Dánta Gaeilge 2005–2015 (Coiscéim, 2016), 'The Birth of Trystan' (Curach Bhán Press 2014), and 'The Crooked Road' (Curach Bhán Press 2016).

Johnson's literary activity extends to the field of translation, and he has authored or co-authored several works of Welsh literature in translation, two in Irish, one in English, one in French, and one in Romanian. He has also translated poetry from Romanian into English, particularly that of Emilia Ivancu and of Lucian Blaga. For his work on Blaga, Johnson received the 'Lucian Blaga International Festival Award' in Alba Iulia, Transylvania in 2010.

From 1989 to 1996, Diarmuid Johnson lectured in Celtic Studies in Brittany, Germany and Ireland. From 1996 until 2000, he worked as a journalist, scriptwriter and translator in Conamara. He was editor of Cuisle, a monthly journal in Irish, between 1999 and 2000, and was editor of the trilingual online literary journal Transcript from 2002 to 2004. He worked at the Mercator Centre for Minority Languages at The University of Aberystwyth from 2002 to 2006. The years 2007–2013 he spent lecturing in Poland and Germany. In 2014, he was bard in residence with Menter Rhos-y-Gilwen in Pembrokeshire, Wales. He then worked as a freelance writer and musician, contributing to various periodicals and antennae, including Raidió na Gaeltachta, BBC Cymru, and RTÉ Lyric FM, teaching Irish, whether in Oideas Gael (Donegal), an Cheathrú Rua (Galway), or at locations on the European continent, and playing and teaching traditional music. His career is well documented in the book 'Seacht dTír Seacht dTeanga' (Leabhar Breac, 2021) which won the Oireachtas prize for non-fiction in 2021.

Diarmuid Johnson's most recent book, 'Ceallach - Cín Lae Fíréin Ad 590 - 620' (Leabhar Breac 2022), deals with the Irish and Celtic contribution to the Christianisation of Europe around the year AD 600. ('Ceallach' is the Irish name of the founder of the city of St. Gallen in Switzerland.)

Ongoing projects of Diarmuid Johnson's include a novel on the Norman Invasion of Ireland, and an overview of Irish-language prose AD 1100 - 1925 (Deoch an Tobair, Leabhar Breac 2023/24).

Diarmuid Johnson currently spends much time in Brussels where he works and winters.

== Selected Books ==
=== Poetry ===
- Rún na mBradán - Rogha Dánta Gaeilge 2005-2015 Coiscéim 2016
- The Birth of Trystan / Trystans Geburt, (German translation by P. Busse), Curach Bhán Verlag, Berlin 2014
- An tÉan agus Dánta Eile / Der Vogel und andere Gedichte, Curach Bhán Verlag, Berlin 2013
- Die Dämonen (with artist Susanne Haun), Curach Bhán Verlag, Berlin, 2012
- The Woods are Growing Younger / Pădurile întineresc, (Romanian translation by E. Ivancu), Eikon, Cluj 2013
- Another Language, Motivex, Poland (Irish, English, Welsh) 2009
- Súil Saoir, Cló Iar-Chonnachta 2004

=== Prose ===
- Ceallach - Cín Lae Fíréin (Leabhar Breac 2022)
- Seacht dTír Seacht dTeanga (Leabhar Breac 2021)
- Éadaoin - Seacht Snaidhm na Seirce (Leabhar Breac 2020)
- Tuatha Dé Danann - Seilbh Inse Fódla (Leabhar Breac 2018)
- Conaire Mór - Seacht nDoras na Cinniúna (Leabhar Breac 2017)
- Pen and Plough - 20th Century Poets and Bards of Ceredigion, Carreg Gwalch 2016
- Tro ar Fyd - Pobl Dwyrain Ewrop a'r Dwyrain Canol Rhwng Dau Chwyldro 1989-2012 (with Amanda Reid) Y Lolfa 2014
- Y Gwyddel - O Geredigion i Galway Gomer Press 2011
- Defnyddio Agored - Meddalwedd swyddfa dwyieithog (with Lowri Jones) University of Wales, Aberystwyth 2006

== Translations ==
- Dafydd ap Gwilym, petite anthologie d'un grand poète (with Jean-CLaude Lozac'hmeur) WODAN, Amiens 1994
- Coinnigh do Mhisneach (from the Welsh original Yfory Ddaw, a novel by Shoned Wyn Jones) Cló Iar-Chonnachta 2004
- Sarah Eile (from the Welsh original Sarah Arall, a novel by Aled Islwyn), Cló Iar-Chonnachta 2005
- Vatilan the Dish Thief (from the Welsh original Y Dŵr Mawr Llwyd, short stories by Robin Llewelyn) Parthian Books 2009
- Washing My Hair with Nettles (selected poems translated from the Romanian of Emilia Ivancu) Parthian Books 2015
- Oh, Ridică Vălul (from the Welsh original O! Tyn y Gorchudd by Angharad Price) as consultant co-translator with E. Ivancu) Eikon 2014
