= Robert Devoy =

Irish geographer

- Born: Robert John Nettleton Devoy

Academic background
- Education: Durham University; University of Cambridge (PhD)
- Thesis: Flandrian Sea-Level Changes and Vegetational History of the Lower Thames Estuary (1977)

Academic work
- Discipline: Geography
- Sub-discipline: Coastal geography Geomorphology; Sea-level change
- Institutions: University College Cork

Robert John Nettleton Devoy is an Irish geographer. He is an emeritus professor of geography at University College Cork and was one of the lead authors of the IPCC Fourth Assessment Report.

== Early life and education ==
Devoy graduated with a 2:1 degree in geography from Durham University in 1973. His doctoral work, an analysis of sea-level changes and land subsidence on the Thames Estuary, was completed at Cambridge in 1977.

== Career and research ==
Devoy moved to Cork to continue his research after graduating from Cambridge. In 1984 he was a visiting researcher at the University of Delaware and subsequently served as a visiting research fellow in Geomorphology at the Australian National University in 1987, and as a research fellow at the University of Sydney in 1990 and again from 1992 to 1993. From 1992 he was the founding director of the Coastal and Marine Research Centre (CMRC) at University College Cork, working there until 2002.

Devoy describes his primary research interest as coastal science, including contemporary coastal processes and coastal management. This has included researching the implications of climate change on coastal erosion and water dynamics. He was a lead author on the Fourth IPCC Assessment Report, which led to the IPCC being awarded the 2007 Nobel Peace Prize. He went on to serve as a reviewer for the Fifth Report published in 2014.

In 2015 he suggested it would cost at least €5bn to properly protect Ireland's largest cities and critical areas of the coastline. Two years later he publicly criticised Cork flood defence plans, accusing the proposed scheme of being too reliant on an outdated study and not taking the threat of tidal flooding seriously enough.

== Selected publications ==
=== Books ===
- Devoy, Robert J. N., ed. (1987). Sea Surface Studies: A Global View. London: Croom Helm. ISBN 0-7099-0871-7.
- ——; Cummins, Val; Brunt, Barry; Bartlett, Darius; Kandrot, Sarah, eds. (2021). The Coastal Atlas of Ireland. Cork: Cork University Press. ISBN 978-1-78205-451-1.

=== Journal articles ===
- Devoy, Robert J. N. (1979). "Flandrian sea level changes and vegetational history of the Lower Thames Estuary". Philosophical Transactions of the Royal Society B. 285: 355–407. doi:10.1098/rstb.1979.0009.
- —— (1982). "Analysis of the geological evidence for Holocene sea-level movements in southeast England". Proceedings of the Geologists' Association. 93 (1): 65–90. doi:10.1016/S0016-7878(82)80033-3.
- Carter, Richard W. G.; Devoy, Robert J. N.; Shaw, John (1989). "Late Holocene sea levels in Ireland". Journal of Quaternary Science. 4 (1): 7–24. doi:10.1002/jqs.3390040103.
- Devoy, Robert J. N.; Delaney, C.; Carter, Richard W. G.; Jennings, S. C. (1996). "Coastal stratigraphies as indicators of environmental changes upon European Atlantic coasts in the Late Holocene". Journal of Coastal Research. 12 (3): 564–588.
