= List of Ross O'Carroll-Kelly characters =

This is a list of characters in the Ross O'Carroll-Kelly series.

== Ross's family ==
=== Ross ===
Ross Kyle Gibson McBride O'Carroll-Kelly is the protagonist and narrator. His initials, given to him by Sunday Tribune journalist Gerard Siggins, are ROCK. This is a double reference - Ross attends the fictional school Castlerock College (a portmanteau of Castleknock College and Blackrock College.)

Ross is the only son of Charles and Fionnuala O'Carroll-Kelly. His middle names are from the famous Irish rugby players Jack Kyle, Mike Gibson and Willie John McBride — his father always hoped that Ross would be a great rugby player. His parents weren't as well off when Ross was young, living in the relatively poor suburb of Sallynoggin. When Charles's business began to succeed, they moved to wealthy Foxrock (which threatened to be renamed Sandyford West in the play Between Foxrock and a Hard Place). Ross was bullied in school, but after becoming a rugby player was one of the most popular at Castlerock College.

As a young man, Ross is vain and a heartless womaniser. Though Ross performed well in schools rugby, his natural laziness meant that he never progressed in the game as an adult. Ross has an intense hatred for "skangers" or "skobies" (as he refers to a particular group of people in Dublin, the majority of whom reside north of the River Liffey) and "boggers" or "culchies" (as he refers to people from outside the Dublin area). His marriage to Sorcha did little to hinder his prolific womanising. Once he has had his way with a girl, he rarely replies to her calls or messages, unless he needs to use her for some ulterior purpose.

=== Charles ===
Charles O'Carroll-Kelly is Ross's father. Ross treats him with contempt, often while obtaining large amounts of money from him. Charles is very proud of his son's rugby skills and demands the utmost respect for him from sports columnists. Ross's nicknames for him, possibly suggested by his initials (C.O.C.K.), include "Dick-features" and "Knob-head".

Mr O'Carroll-Kelly is portrayed as an extreme right winger, with little respect for trade unions, the poor, environmentalism or and state intervention in the economy. He was elected as a local councillor for Dún Laoghaire in the 2004 local elections, but two years later was imprisoned in Mountjoy Jail for corruption (following revelations about the "fictional" events depicted in his wife's novel Criminal Assets), where he then manages to turn the prisoners into a rugby team. Charles has an inflated sense of self-importance, repeatedly writing to the Irish Times on various issues, convinced that people think of him as a "major captain of industry" and man with his "finger on the pulse of the nation". Like Ross, he has an intense hatred of North Dubliners. When he found out that Ronan was born, he bribed Ronan's mother, Tina not to let Ross know about the boy. However, prior to a letter from Fr. Fehily, Charles first speaks to Ronan at Fionnuala's book party. They have since developed a close bond.

During the time the senior O'Carroll-Kelly spends in prison, Ross's contempt for him diminishes somewhat. This corresponds with his father's inability to provide him with seemingly endless resources of finance and Charles's new-found respect for the less fortunate. In essence, this is the first period in their relationship when Ross is unable to prevail upon his father for his every desire to be satisfied. It appears that Ross's respect for his father grows as a result of this.

In Mr S and the Secrets of Andorra's Box, Charles reveals to Ross that he (Charles) is Erika's real father, and that Fionnuala revealed his crimes to get back at him for this. The final pages of The Oh My God Delusion reveal that Charles suffered a heart attack, while on holiday.

Charles' new found vigor for life after the heart attack lead him to rekindle his relationship with Erika's mother and leave Fionnuala. The two open a cheesemongers and all is calm in his life until the introduction of a wig he found while moving leads to a massive personality change. Charles then has an affair with Fionnuala, his original wife who he then returns to and turns to public office once more, starting a new right-wing political party 'New Republic' where he vows to dismantle the current Government and 'Make Ireland Great Again'.

He is elected Taoiseach, afterwards it comes to light that his new found business connections from Russia have been meddling in the social affairs and election systems of Ireland to help him gain power, once in office he begins selling massive sections of Ireland's national forests to the Russians along with other schemes such as turning Athlone into a private prison for European states. At the end of the 2 most recent novel Normal Sheeple Charles orchestrates a plot to burn down Dail Eirin, hiding his tracks before he is exposed.

=== Fionnuala ===
Fionnuala O'Carroll-Kelly is Ross' mother. Often gets involved in campaigns (such as "Halting Sites Where They're Appropriate") to keep working class and disadvantaged elements out of Sandymount and Foxrock. Much to Ross's horror, she has become a successful author of "chick-lit". After sending Charles to prison by revealing his financial crimes in her first novel, Fionnula becomes an extremely successful public figure on foot of her writing. She separates from her husband and falls in love with her book agent Lance Rogan, causing Ross to despise her even more. In 2008, she loses her contract with Penguin and signs a new contract with a new publishing house.

=== Sorcha ===
Sorcha Eidemar Françoise O'Carroll-Kelly (née Lalor) is Ross's recurring love interest, and eventually his wife. She is a benevolent character and is concerned with environmental issues and poverty. Her main interests are shopping and watching Friends, Dawson's Creek and The O.C.. Ross repeatedly cheats on her but is possessive of her nonetheless. Her signature scent is Issey Miyake perfume. Sorcha worked for a short period for Ross's father as a cut-throat human resources manager, helping him to "rationalise" the work-force. She now runs her own boutique in the Powerscourt Centre in Dublin City. She split up with Ross after he slept with their nanny, and she then moved to California with her old boyfriend Cillian, an old flame of hers (who she left Ross for in 2001), but when he went paranoid over money, she left him and moved back to Dublin. She is currently really good friends with Ross, but they are due to get a divorce.

=== Erika ===
Erika Joseph was Sorcha's closest friend during college even though she cannot stand Sorcha's caring nature. Hobbies include horse riding and dating super-rich men. Currently is pursuing a career in organising "Divorce Fairs" including divorce parties and cruises. Totally uninterested with the predictable topics her girlfriends talk about (favourite moment in Dawson's Creek, Weight Watchers points etc.). Erika can put down a man with one lash of her tongue and thus became something of a forbidden fruit in Ross' eyes. She repeatedly toys with the idea of seducing Ross (who knows he would be unable to resist), with the sole apparent intention of hurting Sorcha, but has been in love with Ross's best friend Christian Forde since she was 15.

It is revealed at the end of Mr S and the Secrets of Andorra's Box that she is Ross' half-sister and that Charles O'Carroll-Kelly is her biological father.

Erika went to live in Argentina with her lover Fabrizio, having dumped fiancé Fionn at the altar in The Shelbourne Ultimatum. She had a daughter with him - Amelie, but broke up with Fabrizio after he had an affair. Following much persuasion from Ross in Seedless in Seattle, she returned home.

=== Ronan ===
Ronan "Ro" Masters is Ross's illegitimate son, who, to Ross's initial shame, is a prime example of the skanger subculture. Though only a child, he has many criminal connections, and is tipped by his neighbours to become "the next Genoddle", i.e., The General, Martin Cahill. Surprisingly he is the only character in the series who has been able to make Erika smile and - despite the vast social gap between them - she has grown quite fond of him also. In the more recent books with Ronan becoming a sustained character and being widely accepted as the humour of the stories, his adventures have started to take him overseas generally dragging Ross alongside him. The first of these comes as a result of a school trip after Ronan joins Castlerock and becomes Fr. Fehily's bright hope for their rugby future. The trip takes them to France where Ronan vanishes into the Red light district of Pigalle in Paris forcing Ross to act as a parent and bring him home. While there Ronan calls Ross "Da" for the first time and not something offensive while Ross was thinking about Ronan's earlier statement of becoming a Pimp after uttering the sentence "I think I should get meself a string a' bitches". In 2008, at 10 years of age he falls in love for the first time with a "Mountie" named Blaithin. She is very similar to Sorcha, and is a world apart from Ronan. By age 14 Ronan has found a new love, 16-year-old Shadden. It is revealed at the end of The Shelbourne Ultimatum that Shadden has become pregnant, meaning Ross is to become a grandfather. In Downturn Abbey Shadden gives birth to a daughter which she and Ronan name Rhianna-Brogan, named after the Barbadian R&B singer Rhianna and Dublin Gaelic football player Bernard Brogan. Ross is smitten by his new granddaughter, whom he refers to by the nickname "R&B".

=== Honor ===
Honor O'Carroll-Kelly - Ross and Sorcha's daughter. Sorcha went into labour at Fionnuala's book party at the end of the 6th book. Honor initially hated Ross and cried whenever she saw him but now they have a better relationship, even though, due to the split with Sorcha, Ross only sees her on Sundays. She took her first steps in Starbucks, Dundrum. Sorcha and Honor moved to California with Sorchas ex-boyfriend Cillian. When Cillian went obsessed with the recession, Sorcha dumped him and she and Honor moved back to Ireland. Honor has subsequently grown to be a very dislikeable little girl. She is constantly dismissive of her parents who are an embarrassment to her, even though she is only seven years old. Honor was cast in the lead role in the TV movie adaptation of Fionnuala's misery-lit novel, "Mommy, they've never heard of Sundried Tomatoes". However, before the movie is released, the producers decide to replace Honor as her accent is not considered sufficiently 'authentic' for an American audience. This infuriates Honor whose behaviour becomes ridiculous in "Downturn Abbey". She is expelled from her fee-paying primary school and destroys both the food and Sorcha's dress in advance of Ross and Sorcha's wedding renewal ceremony.

=== Johnny, Brian & Leo ===
Ross and Sorcha's triplets (Johnny O'Carroll-Kelly, Brian O'Carroll-Kelly & Leo O'Carroll-Kelly) are born in Keeping Up with the Kalashnikovs. They are named after Johnny Sexton, Brian O'Driscoll and Leo Cullen, who Ross considers as "very much personal friends" of his. As they grow, the boys take to swearing with a vengeance, and Sorcha.

=== Ross' siblings ===
Hugo, Cassiopeia, Diana, Mellicent, Louisa May and Emily O'Carroll-Kelly are Ross' brother and five sisters, conceived in vitro in Schmidt Happens and born via six surrogate mothers in Braywatch, the twentieth novel.

=== Hillary ===
Hillary Pius Flannan de Barra is the son of Sorcha and Fionn, conceived during a sexual encounter when Ross and Sorcha were going through one of their regular break-ups. He is named after Hillary Clinton and was born at the end of Dancing with the Tsars.

== Ross's friends ==
=== Christian ===
Christian Forde - Ross' oldest friend. An obsessive Star Wars fan, he talks of little else and often merges movie scenes and quotes in to his day-to-day life. He married Hennessy's daughter, Lauren, in 2005. Even though Ross was instrumental in the failure of his parents' marriage by sleeping with his mother, Christian is unshakeably loyal to Ross and is the first to stand by him when trouble starts. However, Christian left for Skywalker Ranch near Nicasio, California, along with Lauren, to join George Lucas's writing team in early 2007. While in the US, Christian was employed to project manage the development of a Star Wars themed hotel in Las Vegas. This ended in disaster as the project ran several hundred million dollars over budget, resulting in Christian's dismissal, following which he and his family returned to Ireland. Once back home, he and Laurel set up a sandwich bar through an American franchise. One day Ross was minding the store and being annoyed by a customer, he spat into his sandwich. This was captured on CCTV and Christian lost the franchise. Following this, Christian retained the lease on the premises and set up a Star Wars themed store, but this proved to be a failure. His marriage to Lauren ended in separation and he started drinking heavily. In Game of Throw-ins, Ross helped him to recover and he even played one game of rugby with Ross. Christian and Lauren named their first son after Ross. Ross Junior is very effeminate, regularly commenting on women's clothing, much to Ross's annoyance. In attempt to introduce him to rugby, Ross bought him a rugby ball. Ross passed the ball to him, but it hit Ross Junior on the head, knocking him out.

=== JP ===
JP Conroy - A friend of Ross' who prior to 2005 spoke "fluent morkeshing", i.e. marketing. He talked entirely in business slogans and catch phrases. (For example, "Sounds like there's a highly resourced, precisely targeted results drive going down here."). JP harbours an intense superiority complex towards members of the working class and common activities include driving through impoverished areas of Dublin shouting "Affluence", "The breadline" and, "The poverty trap". According to Ross, he is doing an MDB (Managing Daddy's Business) at the fictional estate agent Hook, Lyon and Sinker. However, this all changed during a trip abroad with the other 'goys', when JP embraced Christianity and rejected materialism. He entered the seminary, and was in training for the priesthood. Nicknames currently include JP III. He subsequently had a crisis of faith, partly fuelled by his father's refusal to allow him any religious material, but appears to be recovering and becoming his old self again. He will not be returning to the seminary. He returned to working with his father in marketing, but when the recession started, the office was closed down and both JP and his father were out of work. JP's father started a new business repossessing items that people could not pay for. JP joined his father in this new line of work. JP's father hired a Russian girl called Danuita, but JP started to fall in love with her. They are currently working in the repossessing business.

=== Oisinn ===
Oisinn Wallace (Irish pronunciation: [ˈɔʃiːn̠ʲ]) - "One of the goys" (i.e. one of the guys), a large man with the ability to eat just about anything, as proved following his victory at the annual UCD Iron Stomach eating competition. Deliberately goes out with the ugliest girls. He used to work in the duty-free perfume department in Dublin Airport on Saturday when he was attending Castlerock College. An aspiring perfume creator, he is able to tell exactly what aftershave or perfume his friends are wearing. His "old dear" is a "yummy mummy". He has had huge success marketing his own range of scented holy water. Was recently supposed to be getting married, but his fiancée left him after she discovered he had maintained an internet gambling addiction (they had met at a support group meeting). Oisinn has admitted this to Ross, who was to be his best-man. Ross is now supporting Oisinn through his troubles, and progress is being made.

=== Fionn ===
Fionn de Barra - The only one of Ross' friends with academic ability. Though they respect each other as rugby players from their time on "the 'S'" ("Squad"- Schools senior cup team) together, Ross and Fionn are almost polar opposites of one another, and as a result the pair have often fallen out with one another. Their antipathy is compounded by the fact that Fionn once harboured romantic feelings for Sorcha. Ross's jealousy about Fionn's infatuation was the catalyst for his marriage proposal to Sorcha. Though he showed initial feelings for Sorcha, the love of his life is probably Aoife, her bulimic best friend. Fionn became a teacher at Castlerock College where he taught English and History to students including (to Ross's disapproval) Ronan. Fionn's heartache at the end of the 6th book stems from the death of his girlfriend Aoife who dies from the eating disorder she suffered from for years. Fionn is currently unemployed. His proposed wedding to Ross's half-sister Erika ended in disaster when she ditched him at the altar before she eloped with former love, Argentine show jumper Fabrizio.

=== One F ===
Derek "One F" Foley - Sports Columnist from "The Stor" and head of the "Echo and the Moneymen" consortium, who, along with Ross, Christian, Oisinn, Fionn and JP, bought Lillie's Bordello in 2004. He is obsessed with Tina Turner, Cher and the Vietnam War. Constantly referred to by Ross as a "ledge" (slang for "Legend").

=== Ryle Nugent ===
Real-life head of RTÉ Sport. In the books, he is JP's cousin and a friend of Ross and 'the goys' but rarely appears.

== Others ==
=== Hennessy ===
Frank Awder, alias Hennessy Coghlan-O'Hara - Charles' solicitor and friend. He shares Charles' concerns about the working class, and is in trouble with the law for tax evasion. It transpires that "Hennessy" is merely an alias, and his real name is "Frank Awder". This comes as a shock to his daughter Lauren, who is now "Lauren Awder", something that "her old man is not too keen on", as Ross puns. Hennessy is quite fond of the female natives of South East Asia. Along with Charles, Hennessy is a parody of the corrupt past of Irish life as exposed in the long-running tribunals of Inquiry.

=== Aoife ===
Aoife - A kind, sweet-natured South Dublin princess, and Sorcha's best friend from secondary school. Like Sorcha, she has the usual interests of South Dublin girls – Weight Watchers, The OC, Sex and the City, and South Dublin boys. She has anorexia and bulimia nervosa, and is often mentioned as being in and out of hospital. Ross describes her as being like a sister to him, and she is the love of Fionn's life. Although being described as beautiful (Ross believed her to look like Katie Holmes), her negative body image and issues with eating disorders lead to cardiac arrest, and subsequently her death at the end of the 7th book.

=== Claire ===
Claire - One of Sorcha's college friends who is extremely close to her, disliked by Erika as she claimed that she was originally from Dalkey when actually from Bray. Was one of the bridesmaids at Ross and Sorchas ill-fated wedding and was chosen over Erika as a bridesmaid due to her plain looks and little chance that she'd be competition for the bride. Like Sorcha's younger sister Orpha, she too slept with Ross before the wedding.

=== Father Fehily ===
Fr. Denis Fehily (called Fr. Feeley in The Miseducation of Ross O'Carroll-Kelly) was the rugby-obsessed Principal of Castlerock College. He intersperses his motivational speeches with quotes from Nazi speeches, which apparently go unnoticed by even the more intelligent students. (Incidentally, Castlerock's school song is "Castlerock über alles", with parts of the Home and Away theme song inexplicably inserted.) Fr. Fehily served with the Milice française during the Second World War, and apparently never gave up his Nazi sympathies. He is essentially a propagandist for the students, teaching them that a good education is irrelevant as they are the élite that will always have the door held open for them no matter what they do in life. Fr. Fehily's death causes a ripple throughout Ross's world. At Fr. Fehily's funeral Ross makes a speech as a man and feels sad over something worthwhile for once. He includes everyone who was on the Senior cup team in the year they won and makes reference to each of their own personal skills and his lack of any except rugby. While walking out of the church it was the point where each of them knew they were going their own way in life, Ross saying, "A little bit of us all got buried with that coffin." Father Fehily's final act is the spreading of his ashes in France on the street where he stayed during his time in the war. It is also revealed after his death that it was he, who had noticed Ross's problem of being unable to read until he was 15. It was Father Fehily who stayed back after school to help teach Ross how to read and it is one of the reasons Ross holds so much respect for him.

=== Kennet Tuite ===
Often referred to as k-k-k-Kennet due to his stutter, Kennet is the father of Ronan's girlfriend, Shadden. He also shared a landing with Charles in Mountjoy. Ross was once on the jury in a case in which Kennet was the defendant. He was convicted. Following his release from prison, he became Charles' chauffeur.
