= 12 Days =

12 Days may refer to:

- 12 Days (book), graphic novel/global manga by June Kim
- 12 Days (film), French documentary
- Twelve days of Christmas, holiday period
  - "The Twelve Days of Christmas" (song)
  - The Twelve Days of Christmas (disambiguation)

See also:

- 12 Days of Terror, film
- 12 Days of Brumalia, music event
- "The 12 Days of Christine", episode of Inside No. 9
