= We Need to Talk About Ross =

2009 book by Paul Howard

We Need To Talk About Ross
- Author: Paul Howard
- Working title: We Need to Talk About Ross: A True History of the O'Carroll-Kelly Gang
- Illustrator: Alan Clarke
- Cover artist: Alan Clarke
- Language: English
- Series: Ross O'Carroll-Kelly
- Genre: Metafiction
- Set in: Dublin, 2008
- Publisher: Penguin Books
- Publication date: 3 June 2009
- Publication place: Ireland
- Media type: Paperback
- Pages: 236
- ISBN: 978-1-84488-179-6
- Dewey Decimal: 823.92

We Need To Talk About Ross: The Totally Official Biography of Ross O'Carroll-Kelly is a 2009 book of fictional interviews by Irish journalist and author Paul Howard, as part of the Ross O'Carroll-Kelly series. It takes the form of a series of interviews with Ross and his friends in the aftermath of Mr S and the Secrets of Andorra's Box.

The title is a reference to Lionel Shriver's novel We Need to Talk About Kevin.

== Concept ==
Ross has been given a six-figure advance to write 1,001 Birds You must Knob before You Die. In desperation, the publisher dispatches ghost writer Paul Howard to see if Ross will agree to a biography instead. Howard interviews various figures from Ross's life, and tries to uncover the truth behind the events depicted in the novel series.

We Need To Talk About Ross exposes the Ross of the earlier books as an unreliable narrator, for example, hiding any reference to his use of cocaine. Continuity errors in the books are also dismissed as mistakes by Ross.

== Reception ==
Chris Binchy of The Irish Times praised it, saying "By opening up the narrative to multiple perspectives he is able to take the personal mythologies of each of the key characters and slowly pick them apart. […] Howard has always been a sharp, funny and humane writer and this book again demonstrates the keenness of his vision and his ability to find humour in darkness as well as light." In the same paper, Arminta Wallace named it as the best memoir of the year.

In the Irish Independent, Anne Marie Scanlon said "Howard never loses his, and Ross's, trademark humour, even while tackling some fairly serious subjects."

It was among the top twenty bestsellers in Ireland for 2009.
