= Once Upon a Time in... Donnybrook =

2022 book by Paul Howard

Once Upon a Time in… Donnybrook
- Author: Paul Howard
- Illustrator: Alan Clarke
- Cover artist: Alan Clarke
- Language: English
- Series: Ross O'Carroll-Kelly
- Genre: Comic novel, satire
- Set in: Dublin and New York, 2018–19
- Published: 1 September 2022, Sandycove
- Publication place: Republic of Ireland
- Media type: Print: paperback
- Pages: 320
- ISBN: 9781844885527
- Dewey Decimal: 823.92
- Preceded by: Normal Sheeple
- Followed by: Camino Royale

Once Upon a Time in… Donnybrook is a 2022 book by Irish playwright and author Paul Howard and is the twenty-second novel in the Ross O'Carroll-Kelly series.

The title refers to the film Once Upon a Time in… Hollywood and to Donnybrook, location of Donnybrook Stadium where the Ireland women's rugby team play their home games.

== Release ==
Author Paul Howard appeared at the Dromineer Nenagh Literary Festival, and performed a live show based on the novel at The Well, Dublin, on 9 October 2022. The show moved to the Whale Theatre, Greystones in November 2022.

== Plot ==
The country, and Taoiseach Charles O'Carroll-Kelly, attempt to deal with the burning of Leinster House by a Russian-funded mob.

Sorcha is still angry over Ross's adultery with Honor's Irish teacher. Ross becomes manager of the Ireland women's rugby team.

== Reception ==
The book sold 16,406 copies in 2022.

It was nominated for the National Book Tokens Popular Fiction Book of the Year at the 2022 Irish Book Awards.
