= Sean Boru =

Irish actor and writer (1953–2011)

Sean Boru (born Desmond Patrick Bruen; 20 March 1953, in Dublin, Ireland – 14 February 2011, in Essex, United Kingdom) was an Irish actor and author.

== Career ==
In 2005 Boru wrote a one-man stage show called And over here on the left, in which he played the character of a tour guide. Turning the theatre into the bus, he used a mix of film, still pictures, and 3D images, projected onto the stage and a screen, for the audience to focus on.

Boru went to Hollywood in 2006 to film a contribution, as a biographer, to a documentary made by the E! Entertainment channel, about Michael Carroll, as part of the E! True Hollywood Story series on lottery winners. In the film Jack Said (2009) Boru had a small part. Pete Doherty asked him to ghostwrite his autobiography in early 2009; after months of negotiations Boru declined the offer on the grounds that the model Kate Moss was concerned about her private life being exposed. After many emails from her lawyers, and talks with mutual friends of Moss, Boru made the decision to not proceed. In 2009 he was asked by film director Liam Galvin to play a part in the film Killer Bitch in which he played a porn film maker murdered by former football bad boy Jason Marriner.

== Personal life ==
Boru was a regular visitor to his native Dublin. He was a full member of the prestigious Lillie's Bordello, which is a known haunt of celebrities. He was a regular visitor to the Cannes Film Festival in France. Sean Boru lived in Halstead, Essex, near the end of his life and was separated from his second wife Lesley; he has five children. He wrote a regular 2 page column in all of the 45 lifestyle magazines issued monthly by the Fish Publishing Group, covering five counties, Herts, Bucks, London, Essex and Kent with an estimated readership of 2 million people.

== Cancer ==
Boru was diagnosed with lymphatic cancer (Hodgkins Lymphoma) in 1998, 2000 and 2002. He received radiotherapy the first 2 times, then chemotherapy. He filmed the second and third treatments with the intention to help other patients and their relatives to understand the procedures. During his 3rd treatment Boru wrote his autobiography as a private project for his children and grandchildren. His book No Sense of Tumour (June 2004) was published by Trafford Publishing. This led to him writing Careful what you wish For (2006), the biography of Michael Carroll, a 2002 British National Lottery winner of £9.7m. The book was issued by John Blake Publishing in October 2006 (ISBN 1-844-54313-7). Boru died on 14 February 2011.

== Writing ==
In 2006 he was signed by literary agent Diane Banks, and was the ghost writer for an edition of the Alex Higgins story, published in May 2007 by Headline. Sean Boru also wrote a history book about London entitled A Unique Historie of London: Featuring the American Connections (2006); ISBN 1-424-11869-7, published by Publish America.

In 2008, after three years of applications, Boru was invited to audition for the Dragons Den, he wanted to raise £250,000 to put on a unique theatre show based on his former bus tour of London, when he was a tour guide. After 2 auditions he was shortlisted for the next series in 2010. Also in 2008 he met actor/producer Simon Phillips, and won the part of Detective Edwards in the second of the Jack films series, Jack Said. The character was carried over into the next `Jack` film, Jack Falls (2011) with Dexter Fletcher in the role. In 2009, he launched a book entitled A historie of London and Londoners (ISBN 978-0-7524-4861-9), published by the History Press.

He also wrote The Little Book of Snooker (2010) about snooker history, evolution, player biographies and fun stats, his friend Jimmy White wrote the foreword. The royalties are being used to provide free copies of his 2005 film, Sleeping With the Light On, an informative film for cancer patients. The book was written with the help of Jimmy White who also launched the book with Boru in April 2010 at Waterstones, Epsom.

== Filmography ==
- Daddy Fox as Charming Barrister (2000)
- Cradle of Fear as The Coroner (2001)
- Another Life as Courtroom photographer (2001)
- The Hound of the Baskervilles as Lord Edward (2002)
- Conspiracy of Silence as Father Murphy (2003)
- Dreamteam as Frank (2003)
- Lost Dogs as Izzy (2005)
- Jack Said as Detective Edwards (2009)
- Killer Bitch as Sean (2009)
