= Camino Royale =

2023 book by Paul Howard

- Author: Paul Howard
- Illustrator: Alan Clarke
- Cover artist: Alan Clarke
- Language: English
- Series: Ross O'Carroll-Kelly
- Genre: Comic novel, satire
- Set in: Dublin and Spain, 2019
- Published: 17 August 2023, Sandycove
- Publication place: Republic of Ireland
- Media type: Print: paperback
- Pages: 320
- ISBN: 978-1-84488-627-2
- Dewey Decimal: 823.92
- Preceded by: Once Upon a Time in… Donnybrook
- Followed by: Don't Look Back in Ongar

Camino Royale is a 2023 comic novel by Irish playwright and author Paul Howard and is the twenty-third novel in the Ross O'Carroll-Kelly series.

The title refers to the film Casino Royale and to the Camino de Santiago pilgrimage route.

== Release ==
The novel was released on 17 August 2023. Three audio excerpts were released on The Irish Times website to mark the publication. Howard spoke with Ciara Kelly on RTÉ Radio 1 on 21 August about the book.

Author Paul Howard hosted "An evening of reading, story-telling and laughter" at the Whale Theatre, Greystones on 3 November 2023 to promote Camino Royale.

== Plot ==
Ross' wife Sorcha wants a divorce, and he worries that he may have impregnated her sister. His mother Fionnuala falls deeper into dementia, while his father Charles (still Taoiseach) cultivates a relationship with Boris Johnson following Ireland's withdrawal from the European Union. He and his former rugby teammates walk the Camino after receiving a beyond-the-grave request from Father Fehily.

== Reception ==
In The University Times (Trinity College Dublin), Cilian Hickey called Camino Royale "a cracking read. You won’t grow too many brain cells by reading it, nor will you find lyrical descriptions or complex vocabulary. What you should find is a good few laughs at the expense of those who can best afford it."

It was shortlisted for National Book Tokens Popular Fiction Book of the Year at the 2023 Irish Book Awards.
