= RO'CK of Ages =

2021 non-fiction book by Paul Howard

RO'CK of Ages: From Boom Days to Zoom Days
- Author: Paul Howard
- Illustrator: Alan Clarke
- Cover artist: Alan Clarke
- Language: English
- Series: Ross O'Carroll-Kelly
- Genre: Serial
- Set in: Dublin, 2007–2020
- Publisher: Sandycove
- Publication date: 1 April 2021
- Publication place: Ireland
- Media type: Paperback
- Pages: 368
- ISBN: 978-1-84488-569-5
- Dewey Decimal: 823.92

RO'CK of Ages: From Boom Days to Zoom Days is a 2021 book by Irish journalist and author Paul Howard, as part of the Ross O'Carroll-Kelly series. It is a compilation of newspaper columns previously published in The Irish Times between 2007 and 2021.

The title is a reference to the hymn "Rock of Ages", the Irish economic boom, and the use of Zoom during the COVID-19 pandemic.

== Reception ==
Eugene O'Brien wrote in an Irish Times review, "There is a truth in fiction, and in Howard's work, satire provides the mode for the telling of this truth. His parallel Ireland is a mirror though which we can smile at the “real” Ireland, but also learn more about it than it is often willing to teach."

Niamh Donnelly, in the same paper, wrote that "[Ross'] misguided wisdom seems to grow ever more salient as the years go by."
