= This Champagne Mojito Is the Last Thing I Own =

2008 novel by Paul Howard

This Champagne Mojito Is The Last Thing I Own
- Author: Paul Howard
- Illustrator: Alan Clarke
- Cover artist: Alan Clarke
- Language: English
- Series: Ross O'Carroll-Kelly
- Genre: comic novel, satire
- Set in: Dublin, 2006–07
- Publisher: Penguin Books
- Publication date: 5 June 2008
- Publication place: Republic of Ireland
- Media type: Paperback
- Pages: 368
- ISBN: 978-1-84488-125-3
- Dewey Decimal: 823.92
- Preceded by: Should Have Got Off at Sydney Parade
- Followed by: Mr S and the Secrets of Andorra's Box

This Champagne Mojito Is The Last Thing I Own is a 2008 novel by Irish journalist and author Paul Howard, and the seventh in the Ross O'Carroll-Kelly series. It coincided with the beginning of the Post-2008 Irish economic downturn and the release of the first play about Ross, The Last Days of the Celtic Tiger.

== Title ==
The title is a reference to Jonathan Rendall's novel This Bloody Mary (Is the Last Thing I Own). A champagne Mojito is a cocktail made with spearmint, rum, sugar, lime and champagne, which Ross purchases with his last €20.

== Plot ==
Ross's father Charles is imprisoned, Ross is forced to work for a living as the economic crash coincides with his father's downfall, and his wife Sorcha leaves him.

== Reception ==
The book was a bestseller.

This Champagne Mojito Is The Last Thing I Own was nominated for the Popular Fiction award at the Irish Book Awards.
