= Ross O'Carroll-Kelly's Guide to (South) Dublin =

Book by Paul Howard

Ross O'Carroll-Kelly's Guide to (South) Dublin: How To Get By On, Like, €10,000 A Day
- Author: Paul Howard
- Illustrator: Alan Clarke
- Cover artist: Alan Clarke
- Language: English
- Series: Ross O'Carroll-Kelly
- Genre: satirical travel guide
- Publisher: Penguin Books
- Publication date: 1 May 2008
- Publication place: Ireland
- Media type: Paperback
- Pages: 264
- ISBN: 9781844881239
- Dewey Decimal: 823.92

Ross O'Carroll-Kelly's Guide to (South) Dublin: How To Get By On, Like, €10,000 A Day is a 2008 faux-travel guide by Irish journalist and author Paul Howard, as part of the Ross O'Carroll-Kelly series. It takes the form of a tourist guide to South Dublin, written by Ross and his friends.

The title refers to a common travel guide title, "How to get by on [amount] a day", where [amount] is a small sum, e.g. $10.

== Reception ==
In the Irish Independent, Kim Bielenberg called it "wincingly accurate" and praised its description of the (lack of) atmosphere at Leinster Rugby games. In the same paper, John Meagher said it "arguably gave the greatest insight to this milieu of all his books, and it's something of an essential text for those who might have forgotten just how mad the spend, spend, spend Celtic Tiger years were."

In The Irish Times, Katherine Farmar said "A great deal of the humour of the Ross O'Carroll-Kelly books comes from Ross's distinctive voice - that oh-so-recognisable combination of arrogance, complete lack of self-consciousness, and bizarre slang. The Guide to South Dublin is written in a faux-objective voice that blunts the edge of Howard's satire." She added that "there's a surprising amount of purely factual information here that is not particularly funny in itself, nor is it presented in a funny way," but did praise some of the jokes: "The funniest parts of the Guide to South Dublin are the parts that take Ross O'Carroll-Kelly's typical bluntness and apply it to targets he's too self-involved or not bright enough to aim for, carefully treading the fine line between fact and fantasy."

Ross O'Carroll-Kelly's Guide to (South) Dublin was nominated for Best Irish-Published Book at the Irish Book Awards.
