= Roysh Here, Roysh Now... The Teenage Dirtbag Years =

2001 novel by Paul Howard

Roysh Here, Roysh Now… The Teenage Dirtbag Years
- Author: Paul Howard
- Language: English
- Series: Ross O'Carroll-Kelly
- Genre: Comic novel, satire
- Set in: Dublin, 1999–2000
- Publisher: Sunday Tribune
- Publication date: 2001
- Publication place: Republic of Ireland
- Media type: Paperback
- Pages: 139
- ISBN: 0952603551
- Dewey Decimal: 823.92
- Preceded by: The Miseducation of Ross O'Carroll-Kelly
- Followed by: The Orange Mocha-Chip Frappuccino Years

Roysh Here, Roysh Now… The Teenage Dirtbag Years is a 2001 novel by Irish journalist and author Paul Howard, and the second in the Ross O'Carroll-Kelly series.

The title refers to the Fatboy Slim song "Right Here, Right Now" and the Wheatus song "Teenage Dirtbag".

== Plot ==
Ross begins higher education, of a sort, at University College Dublin and between terms takes a break to the United States.

== The Teenage Dirtbag Years ==
The Teenage Dirtbag Years
- Author: Paul Howard
- Illustrator: Alan Clarke
- Cover artist: Alan Clarke
- Language: English
- Genre: Humour
- Set in: Dublin and Ocean City, Maryland, 1999–2000
- Publisher: The O'Brien Press
- Publication date: 2004
- Publication place: Republic of Ireland
- Media type: Paperback
- Pages: 272
- ISBN: 0-86278-849-8
- Dewey Decimal: 823.92
- Preceded by: The Miseducation Years
- Followed by: The Orange Mocha-Chip Frappuccino Years

In 2004, a revised and expanded edition, titled The Teenage Dirtbag Years, was published.

== Reception ==
In the Irish Independent, Declan Lynch wrote "I don't regard the musings of O'Carroll-Kelly as being essentially humorous. I regard them as straight reportage, journalism of a very high order, which holds up a mirror to a way of life, a whole breed of men, most of whom will be avidly participating in the Rugby World Cup. I don't think that some of these guys are a bit like Ross some of the time, I think they're all a lot like Ross, all of the time." Ferdia Mac Anna called The Teenage Dirtbag Years "engagingly subversive," while John Healy called it "Silly but fun."
