= The Orange Mocha-Chip Frappuccino Years =

2003 novel by Paul Howard

- Author: Paul Howard
- Illustrator: Alan Clarke
- Cover artist: Alan Clarke
- Language: English
- Series: Ross O'Carroll-Kelly
- Genre: comic novel, satire
- Set in: Dublin, 2000–2001
- Publisher: The O'Brien Press
- Publication date: 7 March 2003
- Publication place: Republic of Ireland
- Media type: Paperback
- Pages: 208
- ISBN: 0-86278-809-9
- Dewey Decimal: 823.92
- Preceded by: Roysh Here, Roysh Now… The Teenage Dirtbag Years
- Followed by: PS, I Scored The Bridesmaids

The Orange Mocha-Chip Frappuccino Years is a 2003 novel by Irish journalist and author Paul Howard, and the third in the Ross O'Carroll-Kelly series.

The title refers to the Sue Townsend novel Adrian Mole: The Cappuccino Years, as well as The Kandy-Kolored Tangerine-Flake Streamline Baby by Tom Wolfe and the orange mocha frappuccino drink ordered by three male models in the film Zoolander.

== Background ==
Howard wrote The Orange Mocha-Chip Frappuccino Years in autumn 2002, intending it to be the last novel in the series. The idea of making Ross an estate agent came to Howard after shopping for a house himself and being offered a modest house for IR£750,000 by a very young estate agent.

A Moscow publisher aimed to publish The Orange Mocha-Chip Frappuccino Years in Russian translation, but Howard struggled to explain the Irish cultural references. The translator wanted to change Ross to a basketball player instead of rugby; the Russian edition was never published.

== Plot ==
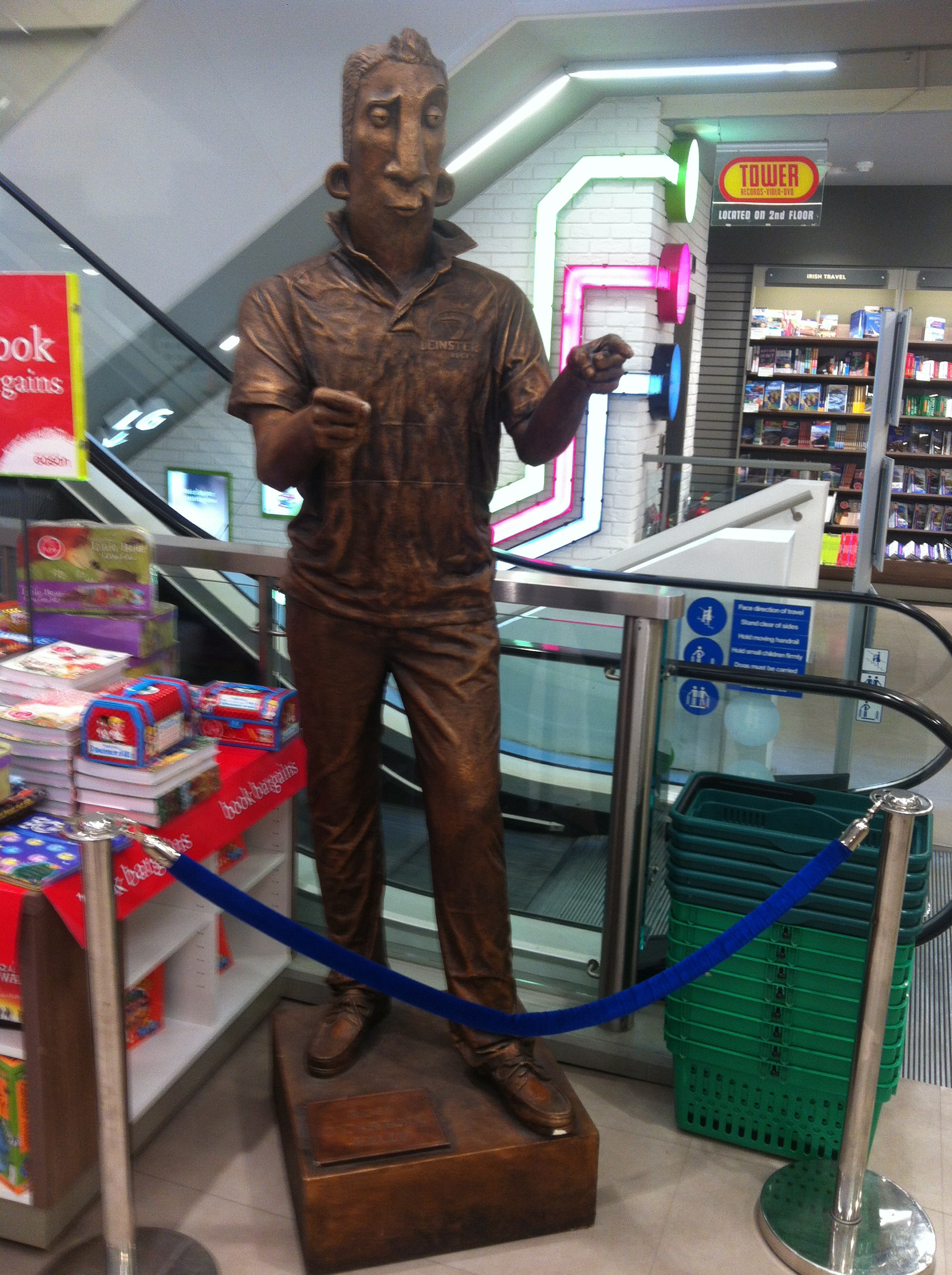
Statue of Ross

After dropping out of college and being kicked out of home by his parents, Ross finds work as an estate agent for Hook, Lyon and Sinker.

== Reception ==
Writing in The Irish Times, Aengus Collins reviewed it negatively, saying "Ross is a character with considerable comic potential, but regrettably little of this potential is realised here. One of the problems is that Ross is a fool living amidst like-minded fools. Too much of the reader's time is spent in the restricted company of Ross's largely identikit friends and acquaintances. […] There is little to pull the story forward, and the telescoping of Ross's emotional development, such as there is of it, into the final four pages of the book is simply lazy."
