= Rhino What You Did Last Summer =

Novel by Paul Howard

- Author: Paul Howard
- Illustrator: Alan Clarke
- Cover artist: Alan Clarke
- Language: English
- Series: Ross O'Carroll-Kelly
- Genre: Comic novel, satire
- Set in: Dublin and Los Angeles, 2007
- Publisher: Penguin Books
- Publication date: September 2009
- Publication place: Republic of Ireland
- Media type: Paperback
- Pages: 490
- ISBN: 978-1-84488-177-2
- Dewey Decimal: 823.92
- Preceded by: Mr S and the Secrets of Andorra's Box
- Followed by: The Oh My God Delusion

Rhino What You Did Last Summer is a 2009 novel by Irish journalist and author Paul Howard, and the ninth in the Ross O'Carroll-Kelly series.

The title refers to the film I Know What You Did Last Summer and to Ross's rhinoplasty.

== Plot ==
Ross travels to Los Angeles to win Sorcha back; he and his family become reality television stars on Ross, His Mother, His Wife and Her Lover; Ross is persuaded to undergo cosmetic surgery, and Honor becomes addicted to caffeine. Fionnuala's novels begin to earn popularity in America.

== Reception ==
The novel was the seventh highest-selling book in Ireland for the year 2009.

In The Irish Times, Ferdia Mac Anna wrote that it was "inexcusably shallow, deliberately vulgar, puerile and offensive – and it made me laugh like a drain. Indeed, there are sequences so funny that I had trouble breathing."

Author Paul Howard later admitted that taking the action outside of Ireland was a mistake: "Ross needs to be here in an environment that he - and the reader - knows well."
