= The Shelbourne Ultimatum =

2012 novel by Paul Howard

- Cover
- Author: Paul Howard
- Illustrator: Alan Clarke
- Cover artist: Alan Clarke
- Language: English
- Series: Ross O'Carroll-Kelly
- Set in: Dublin, 2010–11
- Publisher: Penguin Books
- Publication date: October 2012
- Publication place: Ireland
- Media type: Paperback
- Pages: 398
- ISBN: 978-0-14-104852-9
- Dewey Decimal: 823.92
- Preceded by: NAMA Mia!
- Followed by: Downturn Abbey

The Shelbourne Ultimatum is a 2012 novel by Irish journalist and author Paul Howard and the twelfth in the Ross O'Carroll-Kelly series.

The title is a reference to The Bourne Ultimatum and the Shelbourne Hotel.

== Plot ==
Ross survives the shooting depicted at the end of NAMA Mia!, but has to deal with Gardaí who don't believe his story. He aims to sabotage Fionn and Erika's oncoming marriage. Sorcha gets a job in a pound shop. Honor becomes a child star, while Fionnuala continues to seek fame with her misery memoir.

== Reception ==
In The Irish Times, Patrick Freyne wrote that "in years to come, heavily footnoted editions of Paul Howard’s long-running series will be the textbooks on early 21st-century Ireland." and that "We regularly complain about how artists and writers and musicians don’t grapple with the big issues rocking the nation. Well, Howard has chosen to consistently grapple with the little issues (decking, discount stores, bank shares, downsizing, failing businesses, Katie Holmes) in a manner that says more about contemporary Ireland than a whole Aosdána’s-worth of state-of-the-nation authors."

The Irish Independent reviewed it positively, saying "The writing is, as you would expect from someone as deft as Howard, typically good, there are plenty of good gags and we are offered some interesting questions […] But, to be perfectly frank, I'm not sure how ready people are to laugh at what we're going through at the moment. I know we all have a touch of gallows humour going on, but to this reader it all just seemed a little too raw."

On Writing.ie, Kevin Massey praised the slapstick sequences and "the distinctive ‘voice’ of each character (Charles O’Carroll-Kelly is a particular favourite) that elevates the supporting characters from being mere backdrop to Ross’s antics and gives you a greater insight into the dynamic of the family/group."

The Shelbourne Ultimatum was a bestseller, selling 28,551 copies in 2012. It was the tenth-bestselling book in Ireland for 2012, and the second highest seller by an Irish author (behind Maeve Binchy's posthumous A Week in Winter).
