= PS, I Scored the Bridesmaids =

2005 novel by Paul Howard

PS, I Scored The Bridesmaids
- Author: Paul Howard
- Illustrator: Alan Clarke
- Cover artist: Alan Clarke
- Language: English
- Series: Ross O'Carroll-Kelly
- Publisher: The O'Brien Press
- Publication date: April 2005
- Publication place: Ireland
- Media type: Paperback
- Pages: 272
- ISBN: 0862788900
- Dewey Decimal: 823.92
- LC Class: PR6108 .O93
- Preceded by: The Orange Mocha-Chip Frappuccino Years
- Followed by: The Curious Incident of the Dog in the Nightdress

PS, I Scored The Bridesmaids is a 2005 novel by Irish journalist and author Paul Howard, and the fourth in the Ross O'Carroll-Kelly series. The title refers to the novel PS, I Love You by Cecelia Ahern.

== Plot ==
Ross' request for Sorcha's hand in marriage is finally accepted. At the wedding comes a shocking revelation: Ross is already a father to a son he knew nothing about.

== Reception ==
The book was a bestseller. In the Irish Independent, Celia Keenan commented that "though read chiefly by young adults, [it] is not of course marketed for them. Parents may not approve, but in the way that these books capture and make fun of some of the more unpleasant aspects of modern urban life their heart is surely in the right place." In the same paper, Eoghan Harris called it a "hilarious saga of the southside Dublin bourgeoisie" and "an acute insight into issues of pronunciation and class."
