= Keeping Up with the Kalashnikovs =

2014 novel by Paul Howard

- Author: Paul Howard
- Working title: Raiders of the Lost Dork
- Illustrator: Alan Clarke
- Cover artist: Alan Clarke
- Language: English
- Series: Ross O'Carroll-Kelly
- Set in: Dublin and Uganda, 2012
- Published: September 2014
- Publisher: Penguin Books
- Publication place: Republic of Ireland
- Pages: 385
- ISBN: 978-1-84488-292-2
- Dewey Decimal: 823.92
- Preceded by: Downturn Abbey
- Followed by: Seedless in Seattle

Keeping Up with the Kalashnikovs is a 2014 book by Irish author Paul Howard and is the fourteenth novel in the Ross O'Carroll-Kelly series.

The title refers to Keeping Up with the Kardashians and the Kalashnikov rifle.

== Background ==
Howard finished writing the book on Valentine's Day 2014, and named it Raiders of the Lost Dork, a reference to Raiders of the Lost Ark and the insult dork. A month before publication, the title was changed to Keeping Up with the Kalashnikovs, as the original title was considered an outdated reference.

== Plot ==
Fionn is taken captive while teaching at a school in Uganda. Ross and the guys go out to rescue him. Meanwhile, Sorcha has given birth to triplets and Honor is more difficult than ever, acting as Pied Piper to a troupe of rats.

== Release ==
To promote the book, Penguin Ireland erected "blue plaques" at sites in Dublin significant to Ross.

Keeping Up with the Kalashnikovs was the best-selling fiction book in Ireland for Christmas 2014, and it saw the book series pass the million-copy milestone. It sold 25,431 copies in the year 2014.

It was nominated for the Books Are My Bag Popular Fiction Book of the Year Award at the 2014 Irish Book Awards.

=== Reception ===
In The Irish Times, Peter Murphy praised Keeping Up with the Kalashnikovs, saying that "Line by line [Howard] is an inventive, lively stylist, one whose grasp of the opposing rhythms of the northside and southside Dublin demotic is up there with Roddy Doyle’s." and that "the most effective chronicler of the frappuccino, cheese and vino years was not some superhip social realist but a working-class former journalist, Paul Howard, writing as an upper-middle-class grotesque."

On Writing.ie, Declan Madden praised it, saying it was "a little darker then [sic] previous titles […] but had plenty of laugh out loud moments and was full of Ross’ usual humour."

In the Irish Independent, Ian O'Doherty wrote that "There's an old rule in TV comedy that once you start sending your characters on exotic holidays, you're close to jumping the shark. After all, Ross is effectively a sitcom […] It's certainly an unusual departure for a character so associated with First World problems, and it stretches the character to its limits." He later added that "transplanting [Ross] to the rather murky world of jungle terrorism and Somalian pirates was certainly a stretch. Keeping Up With The Kalashnikovs was undoubtedly his oddest book yet."
