= NAMA Mia! =

2011 novel by Paul Howard

- Author: Paul Howard
- Illustrator: Alan Clarke
- Cover artist: Alan Clarke
- Language: English
- Series: Ross O'Carroll-Kelly
- Genre: Comic novel, satire
- Set in: Dublin, 2010
- Publisher: Penguin Books
- Publication date: 6 October 2011
- Publication place: Republic of Ireland
- Media type: Paperback
- Pages: 398
- Dewey Decimal: 823.92
- Preceded by: The Oh My God Delusion
- Followed by: The Shelbourne Ultimatum

NAMA Mia! is a 2011 novel by Irish journalist and author Paul Howard and the eleventh in the Ross O'Carroll-Kelly series.

The title refers to the National Asset Management Agency (NAMA) and to the Catherine Johnson stage musical Mamma Mia!.

== Background ==
Author Paul Howard insisted that the novel's storyline — with Ross becoming the lover of an older Northern Irish woman — was not inspired by the Iris Robinson scandal, which became public knowledge in January 2010.

== Plot ==
Ireland is in recession, but Ross's shredding company is successful. He becomes a "toy boy" for Regina Rathfriland, a wealthy older woman. Ross tracks down Oisinn and brings him back to Ireland. Fionnuala has switched to writing "misery lit" memoirs.

== Reception ==
The Irish Independent reviewed it positively, saying "Howard has given Ross a new lease of life in this book and it's a testament to his skill not as a writer but as a keen observer of society that Nama Mia! actually ranks up there with his best work."

NAMA Mia! was nominated for the Eason Irish Popular Fiction Book of the Year at the Irish Book Awards.
