= Operation Trumpsformation =

2017 novel by Paul Howard

- Author: Paul Howard
- Illustrator: Alan Clarke
- Cover artist: Alan Clarke
- Language: English
- Series: Ross O'Carroll-Kelly
- Set in: Dublin, 22 May 2015 – 23 June 2016
- Published: 21 September 2017
- Publisher: Penguin Books
- Publication place: Republic of Ireland
- Media type: Print: paperback
- Pages: 368
- ISBN: 978-0-241-97801-6
- Dewey Decimal: 823.92
- Preceded by: Game of Throw-ins
- Followed by: Dancing with the Tsars

Operation Trumpsformation is a 2017 book by Irish journalist and author Paul Howard and is the seventeenth novel in the Ross O'Carroll-Kelly series.

The title refers to the TV series Operation Transformation and American President Donald Trump.

== Background ==
Howard had nearly finished the book when Donald Trump won the 2016 United States presidential election; he felt he had to rewrite it to account for the state of the world: "I felt I couldn’t put out a book which didn’t reflect a Trump era."

== Plot ==
Gay marriage is legalised in Ireland. Fionnuala, Ross's mother, is imprisoned, accused of the murder of her second husband. Ross's triplets develop an interest in soccer. Ross's father, Charles, aims to emulate Donald Trump and build a wall around Cork. Honor adopts a transgender identity, becoming "Eddie."

== Reception ==
Emer McLysaght, writing in The Irish Times, said that "All of the Trump comparisons and the very 2017 “woke” topics might initially seem a little clumsy and shoehorned in, but what Howard and O’Carroll-Kelly have once again managed to do is provide hilarious satire, enjoyably transparent commentary on political happenings at home and abroad, and masterful phonetic conversations across Ross’s own south Dublin circle."

In Hot Press, Siobhán Hegarty said that "Howard's latest satirical offering sparkles throughout and is funnier than ever."

Tara Flynn recommended it for one of her Christmas reads.

Operation Trumpsformation was nominated for the Specsavers Popular Fiction Book of the Year at the 2017 Irish Book Awards.

It sold over 17,000 copies in 2017, being the tenth-bestselling book in Ireland for that year's Christmas.
