= Game of Throw-ins =

2016 novel by Paul Howard

- Author: Paul Howard
- Illustrator: Alan Clarke
- Cover artist: Alan Clarke
- Language: English
- Series: Ross O'Carroll-Kelly
- Set in: Dublin, 2014–15
- Published: 8 September 2016
- Publisher: Penguin Books
- Publication place: Republic of Ireland
- Pages: 400
- ISBN: 9781844883455
- Dewey Decimal: 823.92
- Preceded by: Seedless in Seattle
- Followed by: Operation Trumpsformation

Game of Throw-ins is a 2016 book by Irish author Paul Howard and is the sixteenth novel in the Ross O'Carroll-Kelly series.

The title refers to the TV series Game of Thrones and the rugby throw-in.

== Plot ==
Ross joins a struggling Seapoint rugby team. Ronan is in a turf war with a rival Love/Hate tour operator. Honor is in love with a Justin Bieber lookalike. Fionnuala is marrying a 92-year-old billionaire.

== Reception ==
The Irish Times praised it, saying "This is sharp satire that manages the difficult trick of creating characters we care about. It is a very funny book, often hilarious, providing storylines that mostly keep the page-turning going. Yet it has a genuine heart of darkness hidden beneath the layers of craic, great gags, great storytelling and human warmth. In this way, Ross O'Carroll-Kelly is Ireland."

Anne Gildea, also in The Irish Times, wrote that "I’m in love with the latest Ross O’Carroll-Kelly – Game of Throw-ins. The passage where Ross is confused, mid-match, about the line-out codes the captain has assigned is one of the funniest things I’ve come across in print."

The Irish Independent's Tanya Sweeney wrote that "the entertaining fun of this SoCoDu satire has clearly yet to wane."

Trinity College Dublin's tn2 Magazine awarded it 3/5, saying that it was "not the best title in the series, but it’s a solid entry nonetheless. The overarching themes of time, change and broken families are balanced perfectly against the hilarious antics of Ross and his lunatic family."

Game of Throw-ins was nominated for Irish Independent Popular Fiction Book of the Year at the 2016 Irish Book Awards.

It was the third-bestselling book at WH Smith in Ireland for 2016. It sold 23,997 copies in 2016 overall.
