= Michael Carroll (lottery winner) =

English binman

- Born: 29 March 1983 (age 43); Swaffham, England
- Occupation: Refuse collector
- Known for: Winning the lottery and squandering his prize winnings

Michael Carroll (born 29 March 1983) is an English refuse collector who won the UK National Lottery in 2002 at the age of 19. He received £9,736,131 and enjoyed celebrity status in the British tabloid media, as "lotto lout" and the self-proclaimed "King of Chavs".

== Early life ==
Carroll has stated that he has dyslexia and ADHD, and that he was barely literate by the time he finished secondary school.

When he won the Lotto at the age of 19, he was employed part-time as a refuse collector. At the time, Carroll did not have a bank account, and he tried opening one at Coutts, who refused his application, which Carroll later ascribed to his extensive criminal record.

== Lottery win ==
As a fan of Rangers, Carroll invested up to £1,000,000 of his winnings via Rangers Financial Management, from whom the football club receive a share of profits on the financial services they sell.

Another investment Carroll made with advice was to set up a £3.9 million investment bond, which generated monthly income. He was advised to use this account only if funds from a regular account were gone. Once withdrawals are made from the bond, however, huge penalty fees were deducted; plus the amount of the withdrawal. Carroll, who was very generous to family and friends, gave his mother, aunt and a sister £1,000,000 each, and claimed by September 2003, he had to start living off the proceeds of the bond.

In 2005, Carroll participated in a celebrity boxing match in which he fought Mark Smith, formerly a cast member of the sports entertainment game show Gladiators; the fight was officially declared a draw by the judges.

In June 2005, Carroll was given an anti-social behaviour order (ASBO) after it was found that he had been catapulting steel balls at cars and windows. He was sentenced to 240 hours of community service and was told that he could face a custodial sentence if he did not adhere to the ASBO.

In August 2005 a documentary about Carroll presented by Keith Allen, Michael Carroll: King of Chavs, was aired on Channel 4. The film investigated Carroll's vilification by tabloid papers and whether there was more to him than being a "lotto lout", which included contrasting imprisonment for affray alongside penning a "dappy" love song for his daughter. The next month The New York Times reported that Carroll was, after archeologist Howard Carter, Swaffham's "most famous resident" and an object of "national fascination", following the rescinding of an offer to turn on the town's Christmas lights.

In February 2006, he was jailed for nine months for affray. It was noted in court while being sentenced that, since 1997, Carroll had 42 previous offences on record. Later that year, the BBC reported Carroll was almost broke, having spent his fortune on new homes, drugs, parties, jewellery and cars. Carroll subsequently denied rumours that he had no money left.

His autobiography, ghost-written by Sean Boru, entitled Careful What You Wish For, was published by John Blake Publishing in October 2006.

In May 2010, Carroll returned to his old job as a refuse collector, saying he had no regrets about the way in which he had spent his winnings.

== See also ==
- List of notable people from Norfolk
