= Seedless in Seattle =

Book by Paul Howard

- Author: Paul Howard
- Illustrator: Alan Clarke
- Cover artist: Alan Clarke
- Language: English
- Series: Ross O'Carroll-Kelly
- Set in: Dublin and Argentina, 2013–14
- Published: 15 September 2015 Penguin Books
- Publication place: Republic of Ireland
- Pages: 400
- ISBN: 9781844883431
- Dewey Decimal: 823.92
- Preceded by: Keeping Up with the Kalashnikovs
- Followed by: Game of Throw-ins

Seedless in Seattle is a 2015 book by Irish author Paul Howard and is the fifteenth novel in the Ross O'Carroll-Kelly series.

The title refers to the 1993 film Sleepless in Seattle.

== Plot ==
Ross' father is going to Argentina to find his missing daughter Erika. Ross is dealing with Fionn's new personality, making an enemy of his daughter, and when he gets caught writing "The Fuck-it List" it's the final straw for Sorcha. She insists that Ross gets a vasectomy.

== Reception ==
Seedless in Seattle was nominated for Irish Independent Popular Fiction Book of the Year at the Irish Book Awards. It sold 20,931 copies in 2015.

Writing in the Irish Independent, Ian O'Doherty wrote that Ross "remains both a hugely entertaining character and a deeply disturbed and obnoxious moron. That's a neat trick to pull off, and one which Howard does, again, with aplomb."
