= Dancing with the Tsars =

2018 book by Paul Howard

- Author: Paul Howard
- Illustrator: Alan Clarke
- Cover artist: Alan Clarke
- Language: English
- Series: Ross O'Carroll-Kelly
- Set in: Dublin, 2016–17
- Published: 13 September 2018, Penguin Books
- Publication place: Republic of Ireland
- Media type: Print: paperback
- Pages: 368
- ISBN: 978-0-241-97833-7
- Dewey Decimal: 823.92
- Preceded by: Operation Trumpsformation
- Followed by: Schmidt Happens

Dancing with the Tsars is a 2018 book by Irish journalist and author Paul Howard and is the eighteenth novel in the Ross O'Carroll-Kelly series.

The title refers to the TV series Dancing with the Stars and to the tsars, former rulers of Russia.

== Release ==
Dancing with the Tsars was launched in Kiely's of Donnybrook, an iconic pub that featured in many Ross stories and was about to close down.

== Plot ==
Sorcha is pregnant with a baby — possibly not Ross's. Meanwhile, Charles is at war with feminists, Sorcha is a Senator, Fionnuala is making trips to Russia, Ronan deals with sex addiction, while Ross and Honor aim to win the Mount Anville glitter ball.

== Reception ==
It was shortlisted for the Specsavers Popular Fiction Book of the Year at the Irish Book Awards.

Dancing with the Tsars sold 15,032 copies in Ireland in 2018.
