= Breaking Dad =

- Original language: English
- Written by: Paul Howard
- Characters: Ross O'Carroll-Kelly; Honor O'Carroll-Kelly; Traolach; Sorcha O'Carroll-Kelly-Lalor; Ronan Masterson; Charles O'Carroll-Kelly
- Series: Ross O'Carroll-Kelly
- Genre: Comedy
- Setting: Dublin, 2022

Premiere
- Date: 30 April 2014
- Place: Gaiety Theatre, Dublin, Ireland

Breaking Dad is a 2014 play by Paul Howard, as part of the Ross O'Carroll-Kelly series. It had its world premiere on 30 April 2014 at the Gaiety Theatre, Dublin produced by Landmark Productions.

The title is a reference to the TV series Breaking Bad.

== Plot ==
The year is 2022. Ross is in his forties, and is horrified when his daughter Honor brings home her boyfriend Traolach — a little too similar to a young Ross. His father Charles is Director of Elections for a resurgent Fianna Fáil.

== Reception ==
The Irish Independent was positive, saying "Although the future setting limits the comic material somewhat, there's more than enough humour to be had from Ross feeling the teething pains of a mid-life crisis, and the physical comedy involved in solving the paternity problem."
