= The Twelve Days of Christmas (album) =

- Cover illustration by Alan Clarke

Studio album by Paul Howard
- Released: November 2005
- Genre: Spoken-word, comedy
- Length: 61:57
- Label: Magpie Productions Ltd
- Producer: Mark Lambert

The Twelve Days of Christmas is a comedy album written by Paul Howard as part of the Ross O'Carroll-Kelly series. The title is a reference to a Christmas song of the same name. The project was the idea of Richard Cook.

The CD tells the story of the run-up to Ross's Christmas. It stars Risteárd Cooper (as Ross), Lisa Lambe (as Sorcha), Mark Lambert, Helen Norton, Tara Flynn, Rory Keenan, Karen Ardiff and Paul Howard. Lambe would later play Sorcha in the stage versions of RO'CK: Howard said "Everyone on the CD was great but she was the stand-out. She completely got who Sorcha was."

== Track listing ==
All tracks are written by Paul Howard

No.	Title	Length
1.	"Let's Waste Ross"	7:09
2.	"What's the Jackanory (Story)?"	6:20
3.	"Antenatal Classes"	5:31
4.	"Ronan Goes Ballistic"	4:46
5.	"Swimming Classes"	3:44
6.	"Lillies on New Year's"	3:57
7.	"What Will We Call the Baby?"	5:02
8.	"Mothercare"	3:46
9.	"Totalling the RAV4"	6:12
10.	"Let's Practice with a Virtual Baby"	4:34
11.	"Ross Realises He Is a Major Shit"	5:10
12.	"Let's Make Amends"	5:46
Total length:		61:57
