= The Miseducation of Ross O'Carroll-Kelly =

Novel by Paul Howard

- Author: Paul Howard
- Cover artist: D. Gorman
- Language: English
- Series: Ross O'Carroll-Kelly
- Genre: Comic novel, satire
- Set in: Dublin, 1998–1999
- Publisher: Sunday Tribune
- Publication date: 2000
- Publication place: Republic of Ireland
- Media type: Paperback
- Pages: 127
- ISBN: 0-9526035-8-6
- Dewey Decimal: 823.92
- Followed by: Roysh Here, Roysh Now… The Teenage Dirtbag Years

The Miseducation of Ross O'Carroll-Kelly: The Diary of a Schools Rugby Player is a 2000 novel by Irish journalist and author Paul Howard, and the first in the best-selling Ross O'Carroll-Kelly series. It was adapted from a series of columns by Howard in the Sunday Tribune.

The title refers to the Lauryn Hill album The Miseducation of Lauryn Hill, which refers in turn to Carter G. Woodson's book The Mis-Education of the Negro.

== Background ==
The novel has many allusions to American Psycho by Bret Easton Ellis, from the many prolonged descriptions of the clothes worn by the characters to specific scenes such as Ross dispensing advice on the appropriate type of shoe to wear with chinos, which is taken almost word-for-word from a similar passage in Ellis's work. Several details were altered from the newspaper column; in the newspaper, Simon was the captain of the rugby team and lifted the trophy with the words "For Mom! For Dad! For Rock! For God!" — in the novel, Ross is captain. Howard observed that "in the early days I was trying to make the character [of Ross] as hateful as possible."

== Plot ==
Ross O'Carroll-Kelly attends Castlerock College (a portmanteau of Castleknock College and Blackrock College), a prestigious South Dublin private secondary school, where academe takes a back seat to rugby union. He aims to lead the school to the Leinster Schools Rugby Senior Cup.

== Release ==
Howard self-published the novel after several rejections, printing 5,000 copies and driving around Dublin selling copies to shops himself. It was launched at Blackrock College RFC, where some members complained about the release of an "anti-rugby" book.

== The Miseducation Years ==
The Miseducation Years
- Author: Paul Howard
- Illustrator: Alan Clarke
- Cover artist: Alan Clarke
- Language: English
- Series: Ross O'Carroll-Kelly
- Genre: Comic novel, satire
- Set in: Dublin, 1998–1999
- Publisher: The O'Brien Press
- Publication date: 2004
- Publication place: Republic of Ireland
- Media type: Paperback
- Pages: 246
- ISBN: 0-86278-852-8
- Dewey Decimal: 823.92
- Followed by: The Teenage Dirtbag Years

In 2004, a revised and expanded edition, titled The Miseducation Years, was published.
