= The Last Days of the Celtic Tiger =

Play written by Paul Howard

- Written by: Paul Howard
- Characters: Ross O'Carroll-Kelly; Charles O'Carroll-Kelly; Fionnuala O'Carroll-Kelly; Sorcha O'Carroll-Kelly-Lalor; Ronan Masterson
- Series: Ross O'Carroll-Kelly
- Genre: Comedy
- Setting: Dublin

Premiere
- Date: 8 November 2007
- Place: Olympia Theatre, Dublin, Ireland

The Last Days of the Celtic Tiger is a 2007 play by Irish writer Paul Howard, as part of the Ross O'Carroll-Kelly series. It had its world premiere on 8 November 2007 at the Olympia Theatre, Dublin produced by Landmark Productions.

The title is a reference to the Celtic Tiger, a period of prosperity in the Republic of Ireland from c.1992–2006.

== Plot ==
The Celtic Tiger finishes but the same bad news arises as This Champagne Mojito Is The Last Thing I Own.
