= The Twelve Days of Christmas (disambiguation) =

The Twelve Days of Christmas, also known as Twelvetide, is a festive Christian season celebrating the Nativity of Jesus.

The Twelve Days of Christmas may also refer to:

- "The Twelve Days of Christmas" (song), an English Christmas carol
- The Twelve Days of Christmas (album), an album by Ross O'Carroll-Kelly
- The Twelve Days of Christmas [Correspondence], a 1998 monologue book by John Julius Cooper
- 12 Days of Christmas (book), a book based on the Bluey animated television series

== See also ==
- "12 Days of Christmas" an episode of The Villain Pub
- "The 12 Days of Christine", an episode of Inside No. 9
