= Schmidt Happens =

2019 book by Paul Howard

- Author: Paul Howard
- Illustrator: Alan Clarke
- Cover artist: Alan Clarke
- Language: English
- Series: Ross O'Carroll-Kelly
- Genre: Comic novel, satire
- Set in: Dublin, 2017
- Published: 29 August 2019, Penguin Books
- Publication place: Republic of Ireland
- Media type: Print: paperback
- Pages: 384
- ISBN: 978-1-84488-451-3
- Dewey Decimal: 823.92
- Preceded by: Dancing with the Tsars
- Followed by: Braywatch

Schmidt Happens is a 2019 book by Irish journalist and author Paul Howard and is the nineteenth novel in the Ross O'Carroll-Kelly series

The title refers to the Ireland rugby manager Joe Schmidt and the expression "shit happens."

== Background ==
A documentary entitled We Need to Talk About Ross aired on RTÉ One on 2 September 2019, following Howard writing Schmidt Happens and a Ross one-man play.

== Plot ==
Sorcha has just given birth to Fionn's child, and Fionn comes to live with Ross and family. The triplets become notorious as troublemakers around Dublin. Ross's mother Fionnuala seeks revenge after Ross nearly let her choke to death in the previous book. Charles works with shadowy Russian interests in order to become Taoiseach. Meanwhile, Ross gets an unexpected call from Joe Schmidt, who is interested in his famous Rugby Tactics Book.

== Reception ==
Writing for the RTÉ website, Hannah Byrne awarded it 5 stars out a possible 5, saying "the distinctly Irish comedy will unfailingly evoke a fit of giggles from the reader. […] the story can be curiously heartwarming too at times."

Schmidt Happens sold 23,656 copies in 2019. It was nominated for Popular Fiction Book of the Year at the 2019 Irish Book Awards.
