= Braywatch =

2020 book by Paul Howard

- Author: Paul Howard
- Illustrator: Alan Clarke
- Cover artist: Alan Clarke
- Language: English
- Series: Ross O'Carroll-Kelly
- Genre: Comic novel, satire
- Set in: Dublin and Bray, 2017 – 2018
- Published: 3 September 2020, Sandycove
- Publication place: Republic of Ireland
- Media type: Print: paperback
- Pages: 400
- ISBN: 9781844884490
- Dewey Decimal: 823.92
- Preceded by: Schmidt Happens
- Followed by: Normal Sheeple

Braywatch is a 2020 book by Irish journalist and author Paul Howard and is the twentieth novel in the Ross O'Carroll-Kelly series.

The title refers to the town of Bray, County Wicklow and the TV show Baywatch.

== Plot ==
Ross has become rugby coach at Presentation College, Bray. His daughter Honor has become a Greta Thunberg-style environmentalist.

== Reception ==
Writing in the Dublin Gazette, James Hendicott said that Braywatch was "exactly the kind of ludicrous frivolity that today’s Dublin needs" and that Ross is "so well-written that it's hard to truly work out if his lack of self awareness, selfishness and deeply spoilt view on life actually make him a bad person, or just a fiercely misguided and unfaithful one who's a little too stupid to understand fully how disgraceful he is."

Braywatch was nominated for Popular Fiction Book of the Year at the 2020 Irish Book Awards.
