= The Curious Incident of the Dog in the Nightdress =

Book by Paul Howard

- Author: Paul Howard
- Illustrator: Alan Clarke
- Cover artist: Alan Clarke
- Language: English
- Series: Ross O'Carroll-Kelly
- Genre: Comic novel, satire
- Set in: Dublin, 2004–05
- Publisher: Penguin Books
- Publication date: 1 June 2006
- Publication place: Ireland
- Media type: Paperback
- Pages: 303
- ISBN: 978-0-14-192592-9
- OCLC: 65469820
- Dewey Decimal: 823.92
- LC Class: PR6108 .O93
- Preceded by: PS, I Scored The Bridesmaids
- Followed by: Should Have Got Off at Sydney Parade

The Curious Incident of the Dog in the Nightdress is a 2006 novel by Irish journalist and author Paul Howard, and the fifth in the Ross O'Carroll-Kelly series.

The title is an allusion to the Mark Haddon novel The Curious Incident of the Dog in the Night-Time, the titular "dog" being Ronan's mother, Tina Masters.

== Plot ==
Ross deals with the fallout from the discovery of his seven-year-old son, a working-class Northsider named Ronan. His father Charles stands for election to Dún Laoghaire–Rathdown County Council.

== Reception ==
Blogger Scéal Milis noted this book as the turning point in the Ross saga: "Perhaps the greatest evolution in Ross's personality comes after he discovers at the end of PS, I Scored the Bridesmaids that he had unknowingly fathered a son from the working class Northside years earlier. In his relationship with son Ronan, and later his children with Sorcha, Ross probably exhibits his most endearing characteristics and, despite his general incompetence and irresponsible behaviour, proves himself to be surprisingly good father."

Declan Lynch called The Curious Incident of the Dog in the Nightdress a "literary triumph" and "hilarious" in the Irish Independent, noting that many shops were displaying the book next to rugby player Brian O'Driscoll's A Year In The Centre. The Irish Independent's "PS" column wrote that it "manages not only to be side splittingly funny but also the most accurate and vicious satire on the loathsome, vacuous pond life who make up so much of Dublin 4."

In The Irish Times, Thomas Cooney wrote that "While the joke may not be as fresh as it once was, it still possesses enough punch to elicit a laugh-out-loud response," and that "For those on the outside there is plenty to laugh at, while for those finding themselves relating to and recognising much of Ross's existence, the book takes on a worrying meaning all of its own."

Ross's popularity at the time of The Curious Incident of the Dog in the Nightdress's release led to a "shrine" in his honour being erected in the VIP area of 21, a new nightclub on D'Olier Street, Dublin.
