= Should Have Got Off at Sydney Parade =

2006 novel by Paul Howard

- Author: Paul Howard
- Illustrator: Alan Clarke
- Cover artist: Alan Clarke
- Language: English
- Series: Ross O'Carroll-Kelly
- Genre: Comic novel, satire
- Publisher: Penguin Books
- Publication date: October 2006
- Publication place: Republic of Ireland
- Media type: Paperback
- Pages: 304
- ISBN: 978-1-84488-090-4
- Dewey Decimal: 823.92
- Preceded by: The Curious Incident of the Dog in the Nightdress
- Followed by: This Champagne Mojito Is The Last Thing I Own

Should Have Got Off at Sydney Parade is a 2006 novel by Irish journalist and author Paul Howard, and the sixth in the Ross O'Carroll-Kelly series.

== Title ==
The title is a reference to coitus interruptus: Sydney Parade is the last DART stop before Sandymount, where Ross lives. Many other such phrases are known, e.g. "getting off at Redfern" (Sydney, Australia); "getting off at Edge Hill" (Liverpool); "getting off at Haymarket" (Edinburgh).

== Cover ==
An initial cover design featured a naked Ross holding his "sympathetic pregnancy" bump, a parody of Demi Moore's famous 1991 Vanity Fair cover. Penguin manager Michael McLoughlin vetoed that, and illustrator Alan Clarke produced a new version showing Ross wearing a Leinster Rugby shirt.

== Plot ==
Sorcha is pregnant; Ross begins to experience a sympathetic pregnancy. His mother, Fionnuala, becomes a successful chick-lit author, but her realistic depiction of financial crime causes suspicion to fall on his father's affairs. Ross and his friends invest in Lillie's Bordello, a Dublin nightclub.

== Reception ==
Should Have Got Off at Sydney Parade was the surprise winner of the Galaxy Irish Popular Fiction Book of the Year at the An Post Irish Book Awards.

It was the best-selling book in Ireland for 2006, selling 39,339 copies.

It was listed among the shortlist of 50 for the Irish Book of the Decade prize for 2000–10.

In her work The Undecidable: Jacques Derrida and Paul Howard, Clare Gorman analysed the relationship between Ross and his mother in the book, noting that "Ross has a pathologically intense relationship with her that he denies and represses by insulting her at every opportunity."
