= Postcards from the Ledge =

Play by Paul Howard

- Poster
- Original language: English
- Written by: Paul Howard
- Characters: Ross O'Carroll-Kelly
- Series: Ross O'Carroll-Kelly
- Genre: Comedy
- Setting: Dublin, 2029

Premiere
- Date: 25 October 2017
- Place: Gaiety Theatre, Dublin, Ireland

Postcards from the Ledge is a 2017 play by Paul Howard, as part of the Ross O'Carroll-Kelly series. It had its world premiere on 25 October 2017, at the Gaiety Theatre, Dublin produced by Landmark Productions.

The title is a reference to Carrie Fisher's semi-autobiographical novel Postcards from the Edge and "ledge", a slang abbreviation for "legend."

== Plot ==
The year is 2029. Ross is fifty; his wife Sorcha is Taoiseach; his triplet sons are at the centre of the Castlerock College Junior Cup team. Ross is asked to sell a house in Sallynoggin — his childhood home. This brings up old memories.
