= Between Foxrock and a Hard Place =

- Written by: Paul Howard
- Characters: Ross O'Carroll-Kelly; Charles O'Carroll-Kelly; Fionnuala O'Carroll-Kelly; Sorcha O'Carroll-Kelly-Lalor; Ronan Masterson; Erika Joseph
- Series: Ross O'Carroll-Kelly
- Genre: Comedy
- Setting: Dublin

Premiere
- Date premiered: 15 October 2010
- Place premiered: Olympia Theatre, Dublin, Ireland

Between Foxrock and a Hard Place is a 2010 play by Paul Howard, as part of the Ross O'Carroll-Kelly series. It had its world premiere on October 15, 2010, at the Olympia Theatre, Dublin produced by Landmark Productions.

The title is a reference to the phrase between a rock and a hard place and the wealthy Dublin suburb Foxrock.

== Plot ==
After falling victim to a tiger kidnapping, Ross and his family must save Foxrock from being replaced with "Sandyford East".

== Publicity stunt ==
A red sports car with cast members was parked outside the Department of the Taoiseach as a publicity stunt. The car blocked an entrance, blocking a car with Taoiseach Brian Cowen from leaving, which led to an official shouting at the occupants of the car to move.
