= Normal Sheeple =

2021 book by Paul Howard

- Author: Paul Howard
- Illustrator: Alan Clarke
- Cover artist: Alan Clarke
- Language: English
- Series: Ross O'Carroll-Kelly
- Genre: Comic novel, satire
- Set in: Dublin and County Kerry, 2018
- Published: 19 August 2021, Sandycove
- Publication place: Republic of Ireland
- Media type: Print: paperback
- Pages: 416
- ISBN: 9781844885497
- Dewey Decimal: 823.92
- Preceded by: Braywatch
- Followed by: Once Upon a Time in… Donnybrook

Normal Sheeple is a 2021 book by Irish playwright and author Paul Howard and is the twenty-first novel in the Ross O'Carroll-Kelly series.

The title refers to the Sally Rooney novel Normal People and its TV adaptation (Ross' relationship with Marianne is written in a parody of Rooney's style), and to the phrase "sheeple", used to refer to people who show herd behaviour, but also perhaps referring to Kerry people as "sheep people."

== Plot ==
Charles is Taoiseach, and Sorcha is appointed to his cabinet. Honor attends a Gaeltacht summer college, making her first rugby-playing boyfriend, and Ross takes up Gaelic football, playing for An Ghaeltacht GAA in County Kerry.

== Reviews ==
In The Irish Times, Eugene O'Brien wrote that "Howard’s satire is as sharp as ever, with a parallel Ireland existing more concretely in this latest book, which sheds interesting lights on the real Ireland […] Howard keeps the reader off balance by developing seemingly flat characters into whole new levels of complexity."

In The Stinging Fly, Kevin Power wrote "Our rulers serve themselves: the books remind us of this fact repeatedly. They gratify overtly our secret contempt for the powerful. On the other hand, Ross is a “beloved character”. There he sits, at the heart of our popular culture, reminding us that our society is unjust; that our elites are shallow and self-serving; and that materialist greed is a hollow pursuit. We love him. We think he’s great. And his family and friends, that nest of vipers: we love them, too. Should we? Of course we should. That’s how class works. The Ross books enable us safely both to love and to fear our rulers; to envy their wealth and to disapprove of their behaviour; to experience naked capitalist ambition and sheer class hatred at one and the same time and without contradiction; to map the shifting landscapes of an increasingly unstable world." He also noted that "Ross books are masterpieces of denotative realism. A century from now, an interested cultural historian will be able to reconstruct a near-total catalogue of contemporary upper-middle-class lifestyle accoutrements from Howard’s pages: the clothes, drinks, food, make-up, coffee machines, music, movies, actors and actresses."
