= Mr S and the Secrets of Andorra's Box =

2008 novel by Paul Howard

- Author: Paul Howard
- Illustrator: Alan Clarke
- Cover artist: Alan Clarke
- Language: English
- Series: Ross O'Carroll-Kelly
- Genre: Comic novel, satire
- Set in: Dublin and Andorra, 2006
- Publisher: Penguin Books
- Publication date: 30 October 2008
- Publication place: Republic of Ireland
- Media type: Paperback
- Pages: 356
- ISBN: 978-0-14-190012-4
- Dewey Decimal: 823.92
- Preceded by: This Champagne Mojito Is The Last Thing I Own
- Followed by: Rhino What You Did Last Summer

Mr S and the Secrets of Andorra's Box is a 2008 novel by Irish journalist and author Paul Howard, and the eighth in the Ross O'Carroll-Kelly series.

== Title ==
The title references Pandora's Box. "Mr S" is Frank Sinatra, who Ross' father drank with one night in the Shelbourne Hotel.

== Background ==
Howard stated that the twist in this book — that Charles is Erika's father, and that she is therefore Ross's half-sister — had been planned "from about three books back," i.e. around the time of The Curious Incident of the Dog in the Nightdress.

== Plot ==
Ross becomes the coach of the Andorra national rugby union team. It is revealed that Ross's longtime crush Erika is his half-sister. Ross also attempts psychotherapy as he tries to cope with separation from Sorcha and Honor. Immaculata, the African orphan that Sorcha once sponsored, arrives at the door. J.P. leaves the seminary, while Fionnuala becomes a TV chef.

== Reception ==
In the Irish Independent, Anne Marie Scanlon wrote, "Ross is a monster, but one who consistently entertains us, and maybe it is the Irish obsession with the craic that makes Mr O'Carroll Kelly such an unfailingly welcome character," describing the book as "spot-on social satire."

In The Irish Times, Kevin Power praised Howard's "flawless ear for the verbal self-betrayals of our prosperous middle class […] This is more than an extraordinary comic gift; it is a way of talking seriously about character and social standing." However, he also observed that "The very early Ross books were cruder, but more identifiably satirical […] there was in those early novels a kind of anger that surfaces only faintly in the new one. It may be that Ross is running out of steam."

Mr S and the Secrets of Andorra's Box was shortlisted the Eason Irish Popular Fiction Book of the Year award at the 2009 Irish Book Awards.
