= 12 Days (book) =

2006 graphic novel

- Cover of 12 Days (2006), art by June Kim
- Author: June Kim
- Cover artist: June Kim
- Language: English
- Genre: Graphic novel, Romance, Yuri
- Publisher: Tokyopop
- Publication date: November 2006
- Publication place: United States
- Media type: Print (paperback)
- Pages: 191
- ISBN: 978-1-59816-691-0
- OCLC: 76180456

12 Days is a debut graphic novel/global manga (Note: Kim considers it a graphic novel, but has referred to it as global manga in an interview with Newsarama; reviewers have alternated between labelling it as a global manga or a graphic novel.) written and illustrated by June Kim. Basing the plot partially on a story told to her by a stranger, Kim began an early version of 12 Days as a sophomore in college to help herself cope with the end of a relationship. After moving on emotionally with her break-up, she stopped developing the comic and later left South Korea to attend the School of Visual Arts in Manhattan, New York, United States, from which she graduated with a Bachelor of Fine Arts in cartooning. Following her successful pitch of 12 Days to manga publisher Tokyopop, she resumed work on it in early 2005 and finished in the middle of August 2006. 12 Days focuses on Jackie Yuen, who decides to drink the ashes of her former lover for twelve days in beverages as a way to cope with her grief over her death.

Tokyopop published 12 Days in North America on 7 November 2006, to generally positive reviews. Critics praised the manga for its mature portrayal of grief and relationships, and its realistic artwork, although the choice of print for the dialogue was considered distracting. Reviewers also discussed the comic's treatment of the issues of love, loss, and lesbian elements. In May 2011, Tokyopop shut down its North American publishing branch, with the status of its original, global manga titles left unclear.

== Plot ==
For the first eight chapters, 12 Days centers on Jackie Yuen, a 29-year-old part Cantonese and part Korean editor. After the death of her former lover, the Korean American school nurse Noah Yoon, she decides to drink her ashes over twelve days in beverages as a way of coping with her grief. Nicholas "Nick" Yoon, Noah's younger half brother, steals some of Noah's ashes for her to use, and soon joins her in mourning. She reminisces on how she met her and became involved in a lesbian relationship; however, Noah ended their relationship to marry a man to appease her father, and died returning from her honeymoon in a car accident a month ago. As Jackie continues her ritual, she begins to feel ill and eventually faints. Nick takes her to the hospital, where she recovers. On New Year's Day, she parts from Nick and returns to her apartment to find that he has taken the engagement ring she had wanted to give Noah, and unknown to her, he mixes it in with the remaining ashes. 12 Days concludes with "Chapter 0", set before the events in the rest of the comic: Noah finds Nick studying for exams, and they briefly discuss Artemisia II of Caria, an ancient Greek queen who drank the ashes of her husband. Noah then hints that she has found someone whose ashes she would drink.

== Style and issues ==
June Kim, the author and illustrator for 12 Days, primarily drew the artwork in the realism style, although she occasionally rendered characters as super-deformed versions of themselves. While the cover art incorporates red and silver coloring, the artwork primarily appears in black and white, with occasional gray shading. Kim used pen and ink as the artistic medium, then toned her art with the software application ComicStudio. For the narrative, she explores the characters' pasts through dreams, and periodic, nonlinear flashbacks. Several character traits, such as Jackie's chocolate allergy, are presented to the reader through inference rather than exposition. Additionally, Kim uses a brief, untranslated Korean song alongside the predominantly English text.

Critics have focused on the issues of love and loss. 12 Days primarily deals with "a love affair and its aftermath," according to Dirk Deppey of The Comics Journal. He considered it "a meditation on loss," which explores "a relationship neither fully ended nor easily forgotten by either party." Theron Martin of Anime News Network considered it a story about "trying to find a way to cope with a devastating loss". According to Katherine Dacey, the former senior manga editor for PopCultureShock, 12 Days contains "lovely, quiet observations about the way we grieve, define family, express desire, and remember moments of hurt and betrayal." Johanna Draper Carlson, a reviewer for Publishers Weekly, wrote that Jackie's action of consuming the ashes serves as "a transition period, a way to indulge her grief and then a time to be able to be herself again." AfterEllen.com's editor-in-chief Karman Kregloe stated that the comic "explores the impact of loss, and how relationships are supported and broken in times of grief."

To a lesser extent, critics also discussed the lesbian aspect. Martin felt that the lesbian element of 12 Days had been addressed, without becoming overstated. Casey Brienza, a fellow reviewer for Anime News Network, suggested that the shame Jackie and Noah felt as lesbians "ultimately destroyed their relationship." In her comparison of Alison Bechdel's 2006 graphic memoir Fun Home and 12 Days, Erica Friedman, the founder of the lesbian-themed anime convention Yuricon, considered neither story to be "lesbian narratives", but rather "narratives of grief, of relationships and of missed opportunities for communication and closeness."

== Production ==
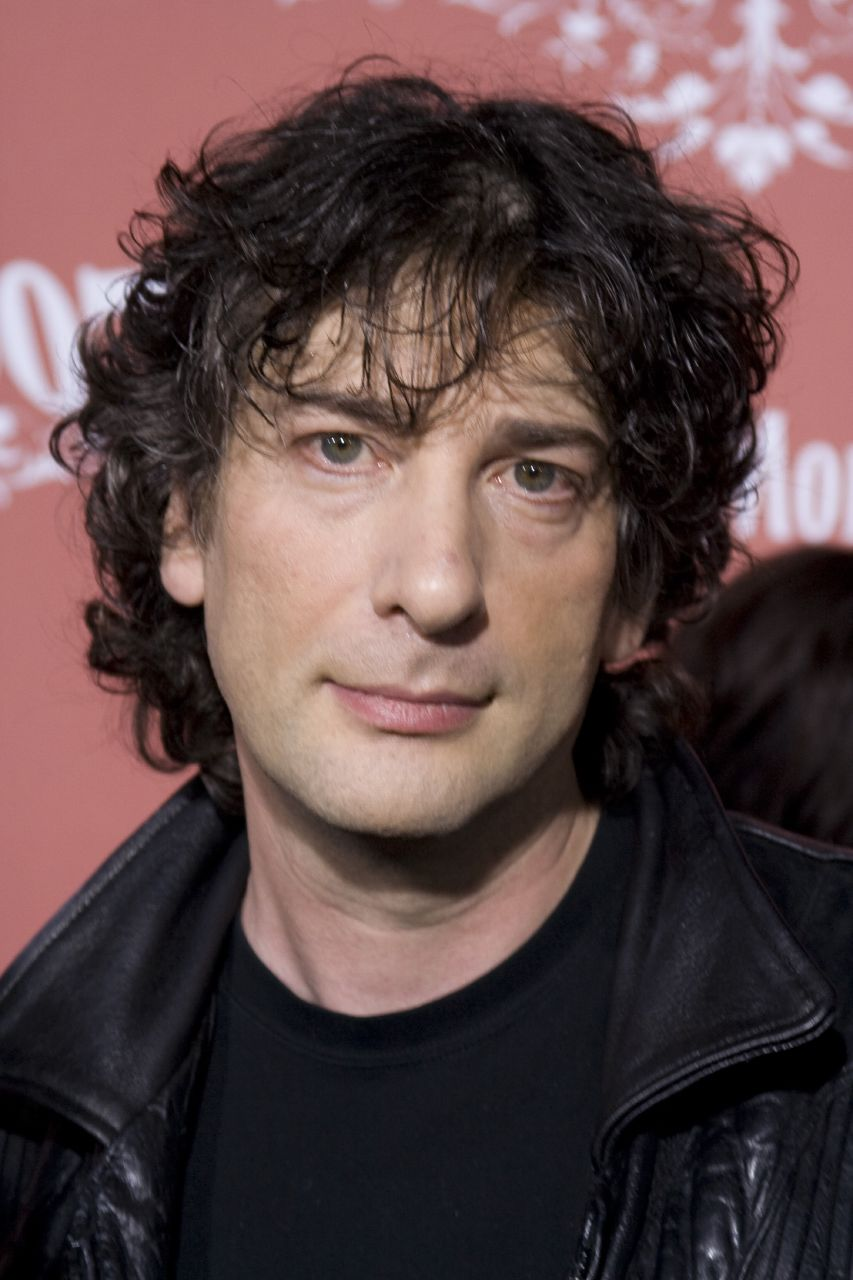
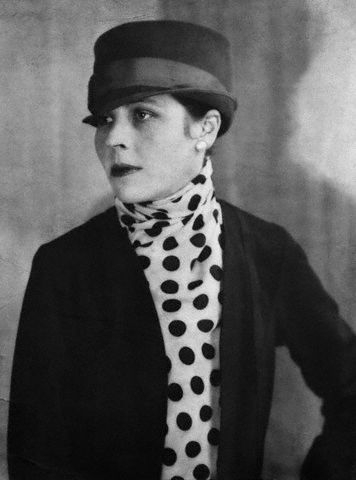
Among her variety of influences when she started to write in general, Kim cited Gertrude Stein, Sylvia Beach, manga artist Kiriko Nananan, Neil Gaiman (left), and Djuna Barnes (right).

Partially modeled on a story told to Kim by a stranger, 12 Days began during her sophomore year in college as a way of coping with the end of a relationship. Kim soon abandoned the unfinished comic after moving on emotionally from the breakup, and considered the early concept "poorly built." After completing her junior year in college in Seoul, South Korea, where she had been studying Japanese language and literature, Kim moved to New York, United States. There, she attended the School of Visual Arts in Manhattan, New York, for four years, and graduated in 2002 with a Bachelor of Fine Arts in cartooning. In addition to illustrating the cover of Australian rock band Jet's 2003 debut album Get Born, she had three of her short comics published in anthologies: "SheepSheepSleep" (2003) in Broad Appeal, "B-612" (2003/4) in New Thing Vol.2, and "Repeat" (2005) in SheWolf Vol.1.

At the 2004 San Diego Comic-Con, she encountered now-former Tokyopop editors Mark Paniccia and Lillian M. Diaz-Przybyl, who helped to pitch 12 Days to their publisher. Kim later expressed surprise for her successful pitch of 12 Days, and commented: "It made me believe there is room for diverse stories." Resuming work on 12 Days in early 2005, Kim felt that her "slow speed, other projects and family matters" delayed its production. Additionally, the South Korean-native Kim, who speaks Korean, English, and Japanese fluently, would think of ideas in Korean that did not translate well over to English, ultimately leading her to change her method of thinking for the comic. She considered her creation of a global manga "a bit ironic," because she "wanted to do something different from manhwa or manga," which she had grown up around. Completed in the middle of August 2006, 12 Days was published by Tokyopop in North America in November of the same year. However, in May 2011, Tokyopop shut down its North American branch, with the status of global manga titles left unclear. 12 Days is also published in Germany by Tokyopop Germany.

== Reception ==
12 Days received generally positive reviews from critics. Caroline Ryder of The Advocate, an LGBT-interest magazine, highlighted 12 Days as "a dark, deeply emotional graphic novel." Brienza complimented Kim's artistic attention to the background and setting's details, and summed up the comic as "a sensitive depiction of lesbians that strives for literariness". While not personally enjoying the comic, Friedman considered it "excellent and well worth reading." Noting the potentially confusing flashbacks, Martin stated: "12 Days doesn't easily fall into any of the normal manga (or manga-like) categories. It avoids any kind of sensationalism in providing a mature piece about a difficult topic, which may limit its appeal but certainly makes it worth reading." While Deppey praised it as "an ambitious and partly satisfying work that very nearly succeeds," he considered it not "as daring or complex a work" as Fun Home. Although Dacey disliked the backgrounds and the "self-consciously literary" ashes-in-beverages aspect, she enjoyed the plot and Kim's use of naturalism in her artwork. She later placed it on her list of the top ten global manga. Draper Carlson recommended it, commenting: "The emotions the book carries will be familiar to anyone who's suffered a loss in love. It's a work to meditate on." Conversely, A. E. Sparrow of IGN wrote that the story sacrificed its coherency in its attempt "for a deeper level of understanding"; Sparrow concluded: "12 Days is simply trying too hard, burying some absolutely beautiful illustrations in a sea of chaotic storytelling."
