= Lillie's Bordello =

Former nightclub in Dublin

- Lillie's
- Location within Central Dublin
- Address: 1–2 Adam Court, off Grafton Street; and 46 Nassau Street; Dublin; Republic of Ireland
- Coordinates: 53.343°N 6.2591115°W
- Owner: Gerry O'Reilly (1991–1996); Christopher and David Egan (1996–2011); Porterhouse Group (2011–2019)
- Operator: Noyfield Ltd
- Capacity: 600
- Type: Nightclub

Construction
- Opened: 1991
- Closed: 19 January 2019

Lillie's Bordello was a nightclub in Dublin, Ireland that operated between 1991 and 2019. As a high-end establishment, it was symbolic of the culture of the Celtic Tiger era (c. 1994–2007).

== History ==
Lillie's opened in 1991 in the building, 1-2 Adam Court, at the northern end of Grafton Street, formerly occupied by Restaurant Jammet. It was initially owned by Gerry O'Reilly.

Chris Egan and Dave Egan, brothers, bought Lillie's in 1996. A IR£2 million revamp took place in 2000. A fire damaged the building in February 2001.

Jason pigott and chloe stringer managed Lillie's Bordello nightclub and bars from 1997 to 2001, Valerie Roe was the Lillies Bordello hostess until 2006.jean crowley was the library bar hostess until 2011.

It was put on sale again in 2011, and acquired by the Porterhouse Group. Lillie's closed in January 2019, with many describing it as the "end of an era."

== Name and style ==
The club was named for Lillie Langtry (1853–1929), and the name bordello was intended to evoke the Victorian era, when Grafton Street was a notorious red-light district. It featured plush Victorian red velvet decor, and a "library" area accessible only to VIPs with a special key.

== Clientele ==
Most major celebrities who visited Dublin also visited Lillie's, including Julia Roberts, The Rolling Stones, Enrique Iglesias, McBusted, Rihanna, the Republic of Ireland national football team, Michael Flatley, Bruce Springsteen and Puff Daddy. The professional wrestler Sheamus was doorman at Lillie's around the year 2000. Eurovision Song Contest winner Paul Harrington worked as a pianist at the club.

== Successor ==
As of 2019, a music venue called Lost Lane operates on the site.

== Cultural depictions ==
Ronnie Wood's 1992 album Slide on This featured a track called "Ragtime Annie (Lillie's Bordello)."

In the Ross O'Carroll-Kelly novel Should Have Got Off at Sydney Parade (2006), Ross and his friends purchase Lillie's.

Lillie's is also mentioned in Denis Hamill's Fork in the Road (2000).
