= Downturn Abbey =

Book by Paul Howard

- Cover
- Author: Paul Howard
- Illustrator: Alan Clarke
- Cover artist: Alan Clarke
- Language: English
- Series: Ross O'Carroll-Kelly
- Set in: Dublin, 2011–12
- Published: 26 September 2013
- Publisher: Penguin Books
- Publication place: Republic of Ireland
- Media type: Paperback
- Pages: 400
- ISBN: 978-1-84488-292-2
- Dewey Decimal: 823.92
- Preceded by: The Shelbourne Ultimatum
- Followed by: Keeping Up with the Kalashnikovs

Downturn Abbey is a 2013 novel by Irish journalist and author Paul Howard and the thirteenth in the Ross O'Carroll-Kelly series.

The title is a reference to Downton Abbey and the ongoing economic downturn.

== Plot ==
Ross becomes a grandfather and his teenage son Ronan becomes a father. Honor is dropped from one of Fionnuala's Hallmark Channel films and is expelled from school. Charles and Fionnuala's divorce comes through. Sorcha throws a Downton Abbey-themed party. Ronan falls in with a local gangster. Fionnuala moves into "mommy porn" with Fifty Greys in Shades, and begins a relationship with Oisinn.

== Reception ==
In the Irish Independent, Ian O'Doherty wrote that "despite all the well-rendered social observations, there is an inevitable, and not unwelcome, familiarity to some of the scenes of chaos. Perhaps Ross has stopped being that scathing postcard from the edge of madness of old and become a more comfy, annual family newsletter."

Writing in The Irish Times, John Boyne praised the book, saying that "The Ross novels show no signs of running out of steam and are already the most sustained feat of comic writing in Irish literature." and praising the portrayal of Ross and Fionnuala's appearance on Miriam Meets "It’s the aggressive relationship between mother and son that provides one of the most unexpectedly moving scenes in the novel. […] when Fionnuala denies that her son is her top achievement Ross feels "suddenly hurt by that. It’s like I’ve been kicked in the stomach." And when she goes on to admit that the lack of warmth or affection between them was down to her, it's a genuinely moving moment."

Downturn Abbey won the International Education Services Popular Fiction Book of the Year Award at the Irish Book Awards.
