= Ross O'Carroll-Kelly =

Fictional Irish character

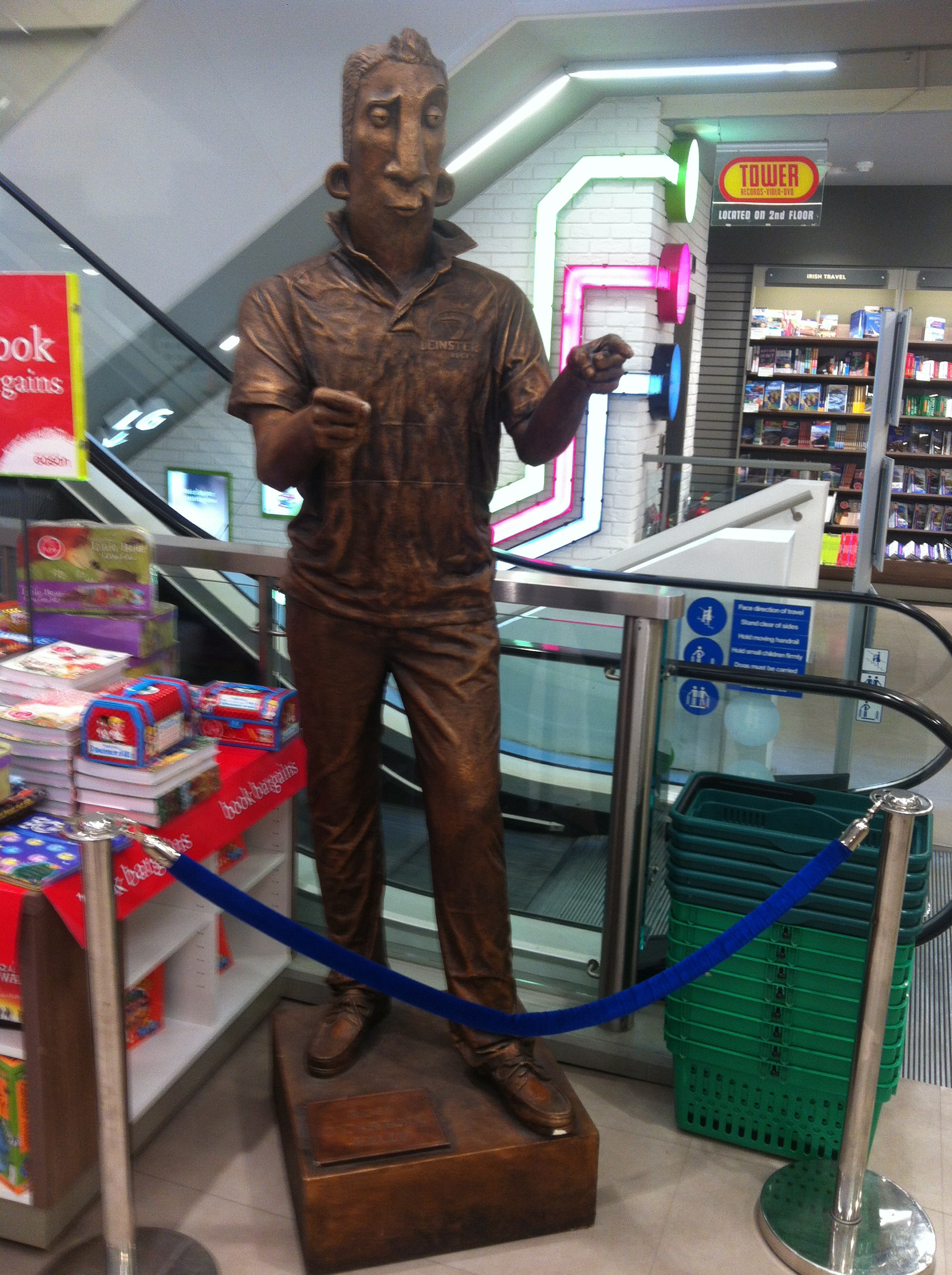
- Statue of Ross O'Carroll-Kelly, Easons Headquarters, O'Connell Street, Dublin
- First appearance: Sunday Tribune column, January 1998
- Created by: Paul Howard
- Genre: Humour
- Publisher: Sunday Tribune, The O'Brien Press, Penguin Books, The Irish Times
- Media type: Paperback; audiobook; newspaper column; stage play

In-universe information
- Gender: Male
- Occupation: Student; estate agent; rugby coach; reality TV star; biomedical waste disposal; mobile paper shredder operator
- Family: List of Ross O'Carroll-Kelly characters
- Spouse: Sorcha Eidemar Françoise O'Carroll-Kelly (née Lalor)
- Children: Ronan Masters, Honor O'Carroll-Kelly, Brian O'Carroll-Kelly, Jonathan O'Carroll-Kelly, Leo O'Carroll-Kelly
- Relatives: Charles O'Carroll-Kelly (father); Fionnuala O'Carroll-Kelly (mother); Erika Joseph (half-sister); Rihanna-Brogan Masters (granddaughter)
- Religion: Lapsed Catholic
- Nationality: Irish

Ross O'Carroll-Kelly is a satirical fictional Irish character, a wealthy South County Dublin rugby union jock created by journalist Paul Howard. The character first appeared in a January 1998 column in the Sunday Tribune newspaper and later transferred to The Irish Times. The series comprises twenty-one novels, three plays, a CD, two other books, a weekly podcast, and the newspaper column, as of 2023.

== Works in the series ==
Medium	Title	Release	Plot
Newspaper column	Ross O'Carroll-Kelly	Sunday Tribune, January 1998 – July 2007	The life and loves of Ross
Newspaper column	Ross O'Carroll-Kelly	The Irish Times, 1 September 2007 – present	The life and loves of Ross
Novel	The Miseducation of Ross O'Carroll-Kelly (revised edition titled The Miseducation Years)	Sunday Tribune, 2000	Ross's last two years at Castlerock College and his Leinster Schools Rugby Senior Cup victory
Novel	Roysh Here, Roysh Now… The Teenage Dirtbag Years (revised edition titled The Teenage Dirtbag Years)	Sunday Tribune, 2001	Ross's first year at UCD and holiday in the US
Novel	The Orange Mocha-Chip Frappuccino Years	The O'Brien Press, March 2003	Ross's parents force him to fend for himself as an estate agent
Novel	PS, I Scored the Bridesmaids	The O'Brien Press, April 2005	Ross and Sorcha get married
Spoken-word album	The Twelve Days of Christmas	Magpie Productions Ltd, November 2005	A comedy album about the lead-up to Ross's Christmas
Novel	The Curious Incident of the Dog in the Nightdress	Penguin Books, June 2006	Ross discovers that he is a father
Novel	Should Have Got Off at Sydney Parade	Penguin Books, May 2007	Sorcha falls pregnant
Play	The Last Days of the Celtic Tiger	Premiered at the Olympia Theatre, November 2007	Plot is similar to that of This Champagne Mojito Is The Last Thing I Own
Mock travel guide	Ross O'Carroll-Kelly's Guide to (South) Dublin: How To Get By On, Like, €10,000 A Day	Penguin Books, May 2008	A mock-travel guide to "SoCoDu."
Novel	This Champagne Mojito Is the Last Thing I Own	Penguin Books, June 2008	Ross's father is imprisoned and his assets seized.
Novel	Mr S and the Secrets of Andorra's Box	Penguin Books, October 2008	Ross becomes coach of the Andorra national rugby union team.
Compilation	Ross O'Carroll-Kelly and the Temple of Academe	Penguin Books, February 2009	Contains The Miseducation Years and The Teenage Dirtbag Years
Book of mock-interviews	We Need to Talk About Ross	Penguin Books, June 2009	A book of mock-interviews in which characters from the series discuss the protagonist.
Novel	Rhino What You Did Last Summer	Penguin Books, September 2009	Ross goes Stateside to win Sorcha back. While there, he ends up starring in a reality TV show.
Novel	The Oh My God Delusion	Penguin Books, 7 October 2010	Ross faces genuine poverty as the Irish economy nosedives.
Play	Between Foxrock and a Hard Place	Premiered at the Olympia Theatre, 15 October 2010	Ross's parents sell their house, and the O'Carroll-Kelly family fall victim to a tiger kidnapping.
Novel	NAMA Mia!	Penguin Books, 6 October 2011	Ross sees a turning point in the recession, for himself at least.
Novel	The Shelbourne Ultimatum	Penguin Books, 27 September 2012	Ross refuses to change his ways, while all around him are affected by the Recession.
Novel	Downturn Abbey	Penguin Books, 26 September 2013	Ross becomes a grandfather; Honor shows she's Ross's daughter.
Play	Breaking Dad	Premiered at the Gaiety Theatre, 25 April 2014	The year 2022. Ross is horrified upon meeting Honor's new boyfriend, who is very similar to a young Ross.
Novel	Keeping Up with the Kalashnikovs	Penguin Books, 11 September 2014	Sorcha is pregnant again and Ross must come to Fionn's rescue.
Novel	Seedless in Seattle	Penguin Books, 15 September 2015	Ross is forced to get neutered.
Novel	Game of Throw-ins	Penguin Books, 8 September 2016	Ross plays for a struggling Seapoint rugby team.
Novel	Operation Trumpsformation	Penguin Books, 21 September 2017	Charles aims to emulate Donald Trump; the triplets take up soccer.
Play	Postcards from the Ledge	Premiered at the Gaiety Theatre, 25 October 2017	In 2029, Ross revisits his childhood home and old memories.
Novel	Dancing with the Tsars	Penguin Books, 13 September 2018	Ross and Honor aim to win a dance contest.
Novel	Schmidt Happens	Penguin Books, 9 September 2019	Ross is unexpectedly contacted by the national team coach.
Novel	Braywatch	Sandycove, 3 September 2020	Ross is hired to coach a school in Bray.
Compilation	RO'CK of Ages	Sandycove, 1 April 2021	Compilation of Irish Times columns, 2007 to 2020.
Novel	Normal Sheeple	Sandycove, 19 August 2021	Honor goes to the Gaeltacht; Ross takes up Gaelic football; Charles as Taoiseach attempts to seize even more power.
Novel	Once Upon a Time in… Donnybrook	Sandycove, 1 September 2022	Ross becomes manager of the Ireland women's rugby team.
Novel	Camino Royale	Sandycove, 17 August 2023	Ross and his rugby teammates walk the Camino de Santiago; Sorcha wants a divorce; Sorcha's sister may be pregnant with Ross' baby.
Novel	Don't Look Back in Ongar	Sandycove, 22 August 2024	Ross returns from the Camino with Sorcha seeking a divorce and Ronan working for Hennessy.

== Cultural impact ==
Ross O'Carroll-Kelly was something of a craze in Ireland, and his name has become a byword for all that is perceived to be wrong in Celtic Tiger Ireland. Though it is largely viewed as satire, there are those who view Ross O'Carroll-Kelly as a role model or an idol. Paul Howard has claimed some people have imitated Ross's friends pastime of driving through disadvantaged areas in expensive cars, shouting "Affluence!" at passers-by and throwing €5 notes out the window. Following Ross's move to The Irish Times, the Irish Independent began a similar column, OMG! featuring a female counterpart to Ross, in its Weekend supplement on 22 September 2007.
