= The Oh My God Delusion =

Novel by Paul Howard

- Author: Paul Howard
- Illustrator: Alan Clarke
- Cover artist: Alan Clarke
- Language: English
- Series: Ross O'Carroll-Kelly
- Genre: Comic novel, satire
- Set in: Dublin, 2009
- Publisher: Penguin Books
- Publication date: 7 October 2010
- Publication place: Republic of Ireland
- Media type: Paperback
- Pages: 422
- ISBN: 978-1-84488-175-8
- Dewey Decimal: 823.92
- Preceded by: Rhino What You Did Last Summer
- Followed by: NAMA Mia!

The Oh My God Delusion is a 2010 novel by Irish journalist and author Paul Howard, and the tenth in the Ross O'Carroll-Kelly series.

The title refers to Richard Dawkins's book The God Delusion and to the expression "Oh my God".

== Plot ==
As the economic crisis deepens, Ross and his family continue to struggle financially, with Ross moving to a ghost estate. Additionally, he and his friends face being stripped of their Leinster Schools Senior Cup medals.

== Reception ==
In The Irish Times, Dan Sheehan wrote that, in The Oh My God Delusion, "Howard has taken what should have been a small-scale parody with a rapidly approaching sell-by date and turned it into one of the most enduring satirical figures in the Irish literary canon."

Dublin news website The Liberty scored it 3/4, Alannah McMahon writing that "the novel reads a little stale. It feels as though he has released the same book nine times [sic] and the story hasn’t really gone very far at all. It remains sublime as a social satire, yet as a novel it seriously lacks the imagination and creativity it so sorely needs to remain the phenomenon it has become."

The Irish Independent praised it, but noted that "if there is one quibble with The Oh My God Delusion, it would lie in the not very subtle message that the financial tsunami we're battening down against can have any redemptive features whatsoever. That's the kind of smug bullshit we've had to endure in the last few months from a commentariat that seems secretly delighted that the average proles have had some manners put back on them."

It won the Irish Popular Fiction prize at the Irish Book Awards.

In a survey, carried out to mark Eason and Sons' 125th anniversary, The Oh My God Delusion was named Ireland's favourite book.
