= Vanessa O'Loughlin =

Irish publishing consultant and bestselling author

Vanessa Fox O'Loughlin is an Irish literary coach. She also writes under the pen name Sam Blake.

== Career ==
In 2006, Vanessa Fox O'Loughlin moved from a career in event management to self-employment, founding Inkwell Writers Workshops to run fiction-writing workshops taught by bestselling published writers. During the post-2008 Irish economic downturn, the company was renamed The Inkwell Group and became a publishing consultancy. O'Loughlin publishes crime fiction as "Sam Blake".

In 2019 she was elected to the Management Committee of the Society of Authors. In 2024, she was elected as the new chair, succeeding Joanne Harris.

In 2022, O'Loughlin was one of over 100 authors to contribute to 100 Ways to Write a Book – a compilation of author interviews put together by author Alex Pearl during the COVID pandemic.

=== Sam Blake ===
In 2015, Swedish publishing group Bonnier Twenty7 signed O'Loughlin to write a three-book series of crime novels featuring Garda detective Cat Connolly and set in Dublin. The first book in the series was Little Bones, and was released, as were the two subsequent volumes, under the pen name Sam Blake. Little Bones went straight into the Irish fiction bestseller list at first place and stayed there for four weeks, eventually featuring in the Irish top ten for eight weeks. In Deep Water and No Turning Back also entered the Irish bestseller lists.

In January 2020, standalone thriller Keep Your Eyes on Me was released by Corvus Books, together with an audio recording from Bolinda Publishing narrated by Harry Potter star Evanna Lynch. Keep Your Eyes on Me was also a No.1 Irish Times bestseller.

One of the two lead characters in High Pressure came from No Turning Back, and the other in turn was the lead in Remember My Name; the author commented "All my books are set in different locations but in the same world. For readers I hope this creates a sense of total immersion".

In January 2022 The Dark Room, was published by Corvus Books.

In 2023 her debut YA was published with Gill Books, Something Terrible Happened Last Night, followed in May 2024 by Something's About to Blow Up. She is continuing with adult fiction however and Three Little Birds (January 2024) was her tenth book.

In April 2026, she was a guest on the Off the Shelf podcast.

=== Writing.ie ===
O'Loughlin founded Writing.ie in 2011; it developed into an Irish writers' web resource that covers literary events and offers advice to writers.

The Irish Independent describes Writing.ie as "a one-stop shop for authors".

== Personal life ==
Fox comes from St Albans in Hertfordshire, England. She met her future husband, Shane O'Loughlin, a member of the Irish police force, at a sports event in 1992, and they married in 1993. They lived first in Bray, County Wicklow, then moved to nearby Kilmacanogue. They have two children. She cites Daphne du Maurier as a major inspiration.

== Publications ==
=== Non-fiction & anthologies (under her own name) ===
- Do the Write Thing: 14 Winning Stories by Ireland's Newest Writers (contributor, 2007)
- Big Book of Hope (edited, 2010)
- Writing to Get Published: Bringing the Dream Alive (guide, 2011)
- The New Big Book of Hope (edited, 2012)
- Taking the Plunge: New Writing from Dun Laoghaire–Rathdown (anthology editor)

=== Cat Connolly series (as Sam Blake) ===
1. Little Bones (2017)
2. In Deep Water (2017)
3. No Turning Back (2018)

=== Stand-alone thrillers ===
- Keep Your Eyes on Me (2020)
- The Dark Room (2021)
- High Pressure (2021)
- Remember My Name (2022)
- The Mystery of Four (2023)
- Something Terrible Happened Last Night (YA, 2023)
- Three Little Birds (2024)
- Something's About to Blow Up (YA, May 2024)
- The Killing Sense (2025)

=== Publications with contributions by O'Loughlin ===
- 100 Ways to Write a Book (2022) – a pandemic-era compilation of author interviews
