= Paul Howard (writer) =

Irish journalist and author

- Born: 6 January 1971 (age 55); London, United Kingdom
- Citizenship: Irish
- Occupations: Novelist, playwright, journalist, screenwriter, podcaster
- Spouse: Mary McCarthy
- Writing career
- Pen name: Ross O'Carroll-Kelly
- Years active: 1988–present
- Genre: Comic novel
- Notable work: Ross O'Carroll-Kelly

Paul Howard (born 6 January 1971) is an Irish journalist, author and comedy writer. He is the creator of the character Ross O'Carroll-Kelly, a fictional Dublin 4 "rugby jock".

== Life and career ==
Howard was born 6 January 1971 in London. He worked for sixteen years as a journalist, mostly for The Sunday Tribune, first in news and later as one of Ireland's most respected sportswriters. He was chief sportswriter of The Sunday Tribune and one of the first to question the achievements of Michelle Smith de Bruin. He covered two Olympics, a World Cup and numerous major sporting events. He was named Sports Journalist of the Year in the 1998 Irish Media Awards.

Howard is the creator of the "rugby jock" character Ross O'Carroll-Kelly, whose exploits have been the subject of twenty-four novels and three other books that have close to 2 million copies in Ireland. He was named National Newspapers of Ireland Columnist of the Year in 2013 for his weekly column in The Irish Times on Saturday written under the Ross O'Carroll-Kelly pseudonym.

He is also the author of five plays – The Last Days of the Celtic Tiger in 2007, Between Foxrock and a Hard Place in 2010, Breaking Dad in 2014, Postcards from the Ledge in 2017, and The Shit Table in 2024 – as well as the 2012 puppet-based Anglo the Musical and a second musical Copper Face Jacks: The Musical, based on the nightclub Copper Face Jacks, in 2018.

His first non-Ross-related venture into fiction: Triggs – The Autobiography of Roy Keane's Dog – was a #1 Bestseller in 2012, and short-listed for an Irish Book Award.

He has written several nonfiction books, including The Joy, an account of life in Mountjoy Prison, The Gaffers: Mick McCarthy, Roy Keane and the Team they Built, an account of the McCarthy–Keane clash during the run-up to the 2002 World Cup. He also ghostwrote the autobiographies of boxer Steve Collins (Celtic Warrior) and broadcaster George Hook (Time Added On). He also co-authored Roddy Collins’ memoir The Rodfather.

He is the author of the biography of Tara Browne, I Read the News Today, Oh Boy, published in October 2016.

He has written two children’s books called Aldrin Adams and the Cheese Nightmares and Aldrin Adams and the Legend of Nemeswiss and has also co-written five children's books with former Ireland rugby player Gordon D'Arcy called Gordon's Game, Gordon's Game: Blue Thunder, Gordon's Game: Lions Roar, Let’s Play Rugby! and Let’s Play Football!.

Howard was part of the writing team for BAFTA and IFTA award-winning Apple+ tv show, Bad Sisters (Series 1 and 2), Series 5 of The Young Offenders and wrote for and was story editor for Series 2 of SisterS.

== Awards and recognition ==
Howard is a record five-time Irish Book Award winner, collecting the Best Popular Fiction prize in 2007 for Should Have Got Off at Sydney Parade, in 2010 for The Oh My God Delusion, in 2013 for Downturn Abbey (each parts of the Ross O'Carroll-Kelly series), Non-Fiction Book of the Year in 2016 for the biography of Tara Browne, I Read the News Today, Oh Boy and a Special Recognition Award for his contribution to the Irish publishing industry in 2024. He has been nominated for a record twenty-four Irish Book Awards.

He has written comedy for radio and television and was part of the writing teams for two series of two RTÉ comedy sketch shows in the autumns of 2012 and 2013, Irish Pictorial Weekly and The Mario Rosenstock Show. He also appeared in a number of sketches in Irish Pictorial Weekly. Irish Pictorial Weekly was twice nominated for an Irish Film and Television Award.

In September 2019, he was the subject of an hour long RTÉ documentary entitled We Need to Talk about Ross produced by Adrian McCarthy of Wildfire Films. He was a guest on the television shows Keys to My Life and High Road, Low Road.
