= Samuel Middleton =

Samuel Middleton may refer to:

- Samuel Middleton (priest) (1884–1964), Anglican priest in Canada
- Samuel Middleton (cricketer) (1901–1949), Irish cricketer

== See also ==
- Sam Middleton (1927–2015), mixed-media artist from New York City
- Samuel Middleton Semmes (1811–1867), American attorney and Maryland state senator
