= R774 road (Ireland) =

Road in Ireland

R774 road
- Bóthar R774
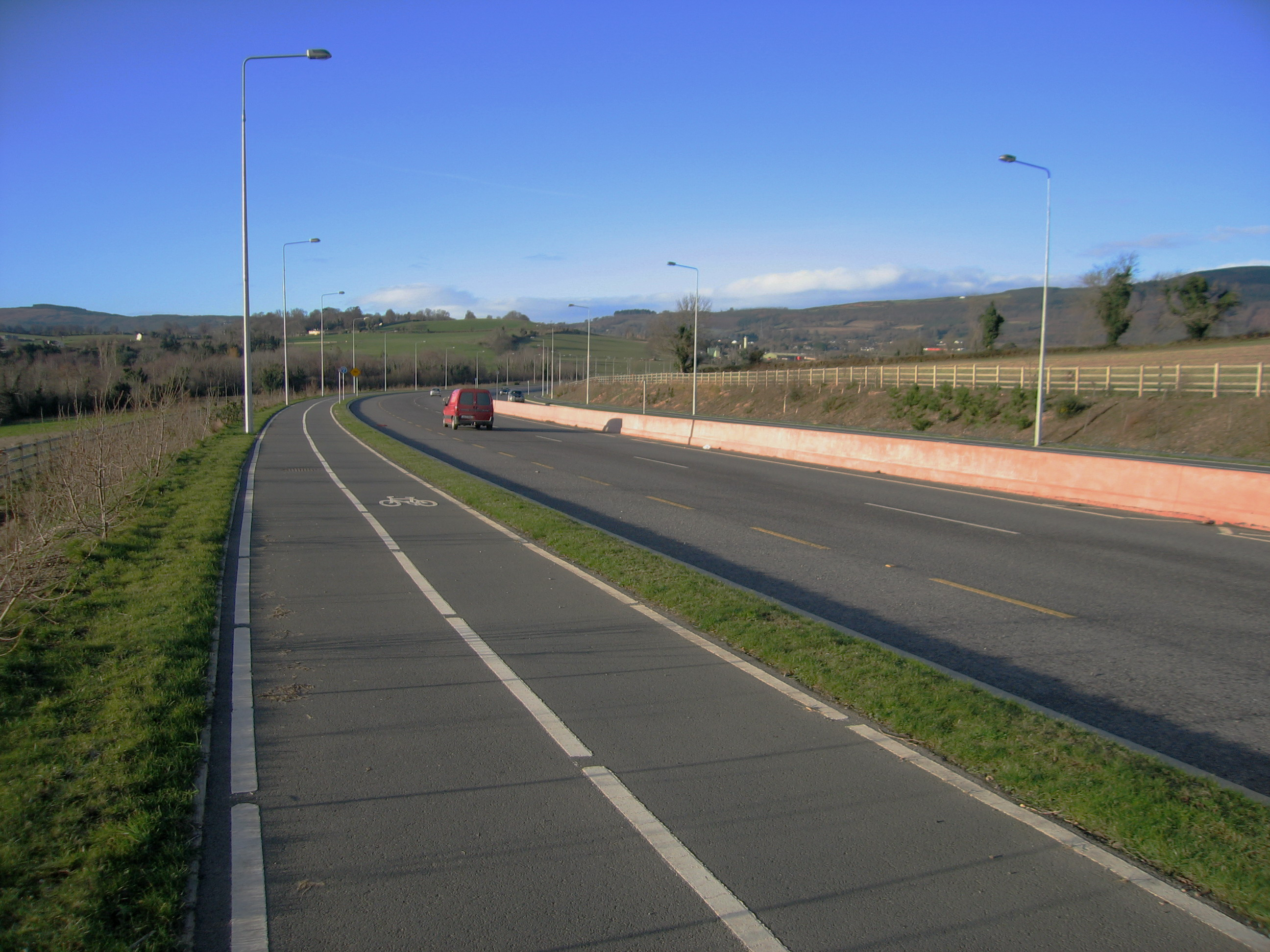
- R774 west, towards the N11

Route information
- Length: 4.7 km (2.9 mi)

Location
- Country: Ireland
- Primary destinations: County Wicklow; Kilpedder; Charlesland; Greystones

Highway system
- Roads in Ireland; Motorways; Primary; Secondary; Regional

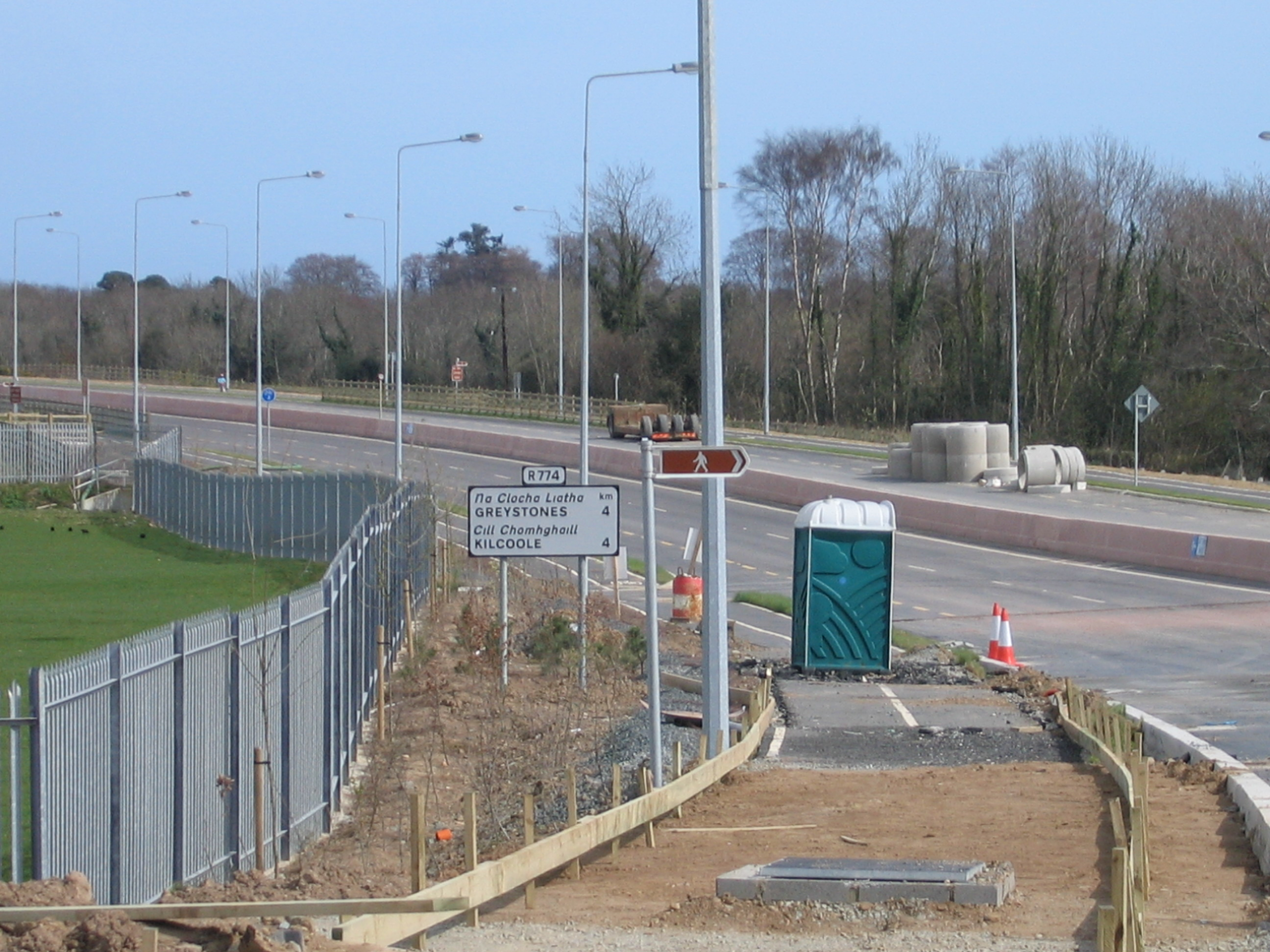
R774 near the temporary N11 junction

The R774 road is a regional road in County Wicklow, Ireland, which has been named the Farenkelly Road. It is a 4.7 km (2.9 mi) dual-carriageway that connects the town of Greystones with the N11 national primary road at J11.

The road crosses the R761 at a roundabout near Eden Gate and terminates at the R762 north of Charlesland, Greystones.

It was completed in 2004 but not connected to the N11 until June 2006, via a temporary "left-in, left-out" junction. The construction of a full grade interchange between the R774 and N11 was delayed when an illegal dump was unearthed at the original location for the junction.

Construction of the permanent fully grade-separated junction (J11 on the N11) started in October 2006 and was completed in 2008.

A distinctive feature of this road is the pink central barrier (see thumbnail); it may be the only coloured barrier in Ireland.

== See also ==
- Roads in Ireland
- National primary road
- National secondary road
