= Senator Semmes =

Senator Semmes may refer to:

- Benedict Joseph Semmes (1789–1863), Maryland State Senate
- Samuel Middleton Semmes (1811–1867), Maryland State Senate
- Thomas Jenkins Semmes (1824-1899), Confederate States Senator from Louisiana from 1862 to 1865
