= Killincarrig =

Suburb of Greystones, County Wicklow, Ireland

Killincarrig Coillín na Carraige
- Village
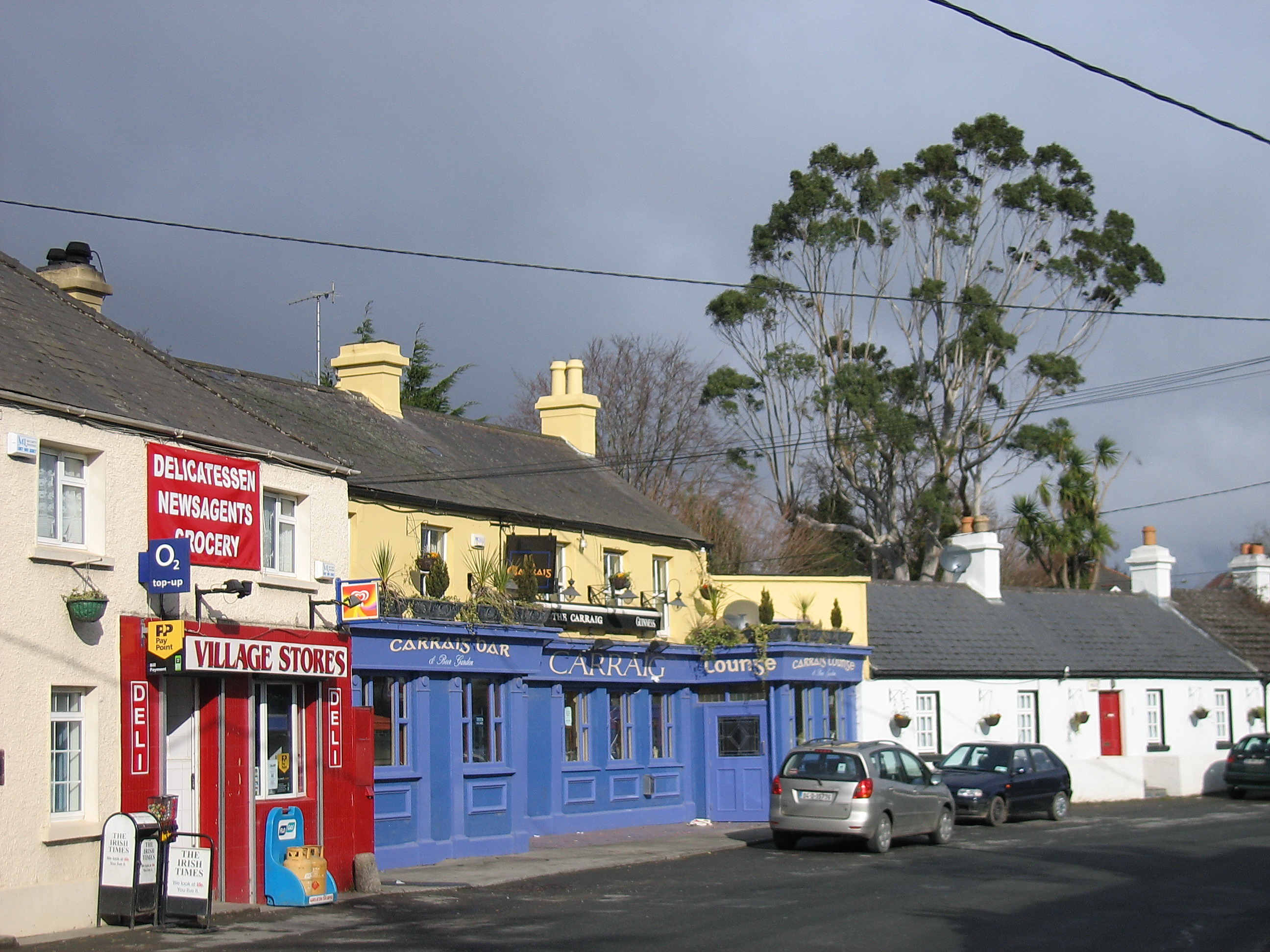
- The R761 road through the village

- Location in Ireland
- Coordinates: 53°08′10″N 6°04′39″W
- Country: Ireland
- Province: Leinster
- County: County Wicklow

Killincarrig (Irish: Coillín na Carraige, meaning 'little wood of the rock') is a village between Greystones and Delgany in North County Wicklow. It lies at the crossroads (now a mini-roundabout) of the R762 and the R761 roads. Like neighbouring Delgany it has been steadily built up over the past 40 years and now forms part of the continuous urban area of Greystones.

== History ==
Killincarrig predates Greystones village. Some of its historical sites are the 16th-century ruins of an Elizabethan manor House called Killincarrig Castle, and an 18th-century Flour Mill. Killincarrig had one of Ireland’s oldest Cherry Orchards which had 200 trees. The town also had a brewery at around 1815 owned by the Jones family.

An early mention of Killincarrig can be found in Samual Lewis "A Topographical Dictionary of Ireland (1837)". He says:

"KILLINCARRIG, a village, in the parish of DELGANY, barony of RATHDOWN, county of WICKLOW, and province of LEINSTER, ½ a mile (E. N. E.) from Delgany, on the road from Bray to Wicklow; containing 23 houses and 168 inhabitants. Killincarrick House, the seat of A. Jones, Esq., is situated in grounds tastefully laid out and commanding very fine mountain and sea views: in the demesne are the ivy-clad remains of an ancient castle, in which several silver coins of William III. were discovered in 1833. Mr. Jones has an extensive flour-mill here."

=== Killincarrig Castle ===
Killincarrig still holds the ruins of an Elizabethan manor house known today as Killincarrig Castle.

Killincarrig Castle was constructed in the early 16th Century. It was owned by one Henry Walsh, of the Anglo-Irish Walsh family who were influential in North Wicklow and South Dublin. Their primary homestead was a castle at Carrickmines. At the time Killincarrig Castle would have been a fine home. The 1657 Down Survey mentions that it was the "finest building in the half barony".

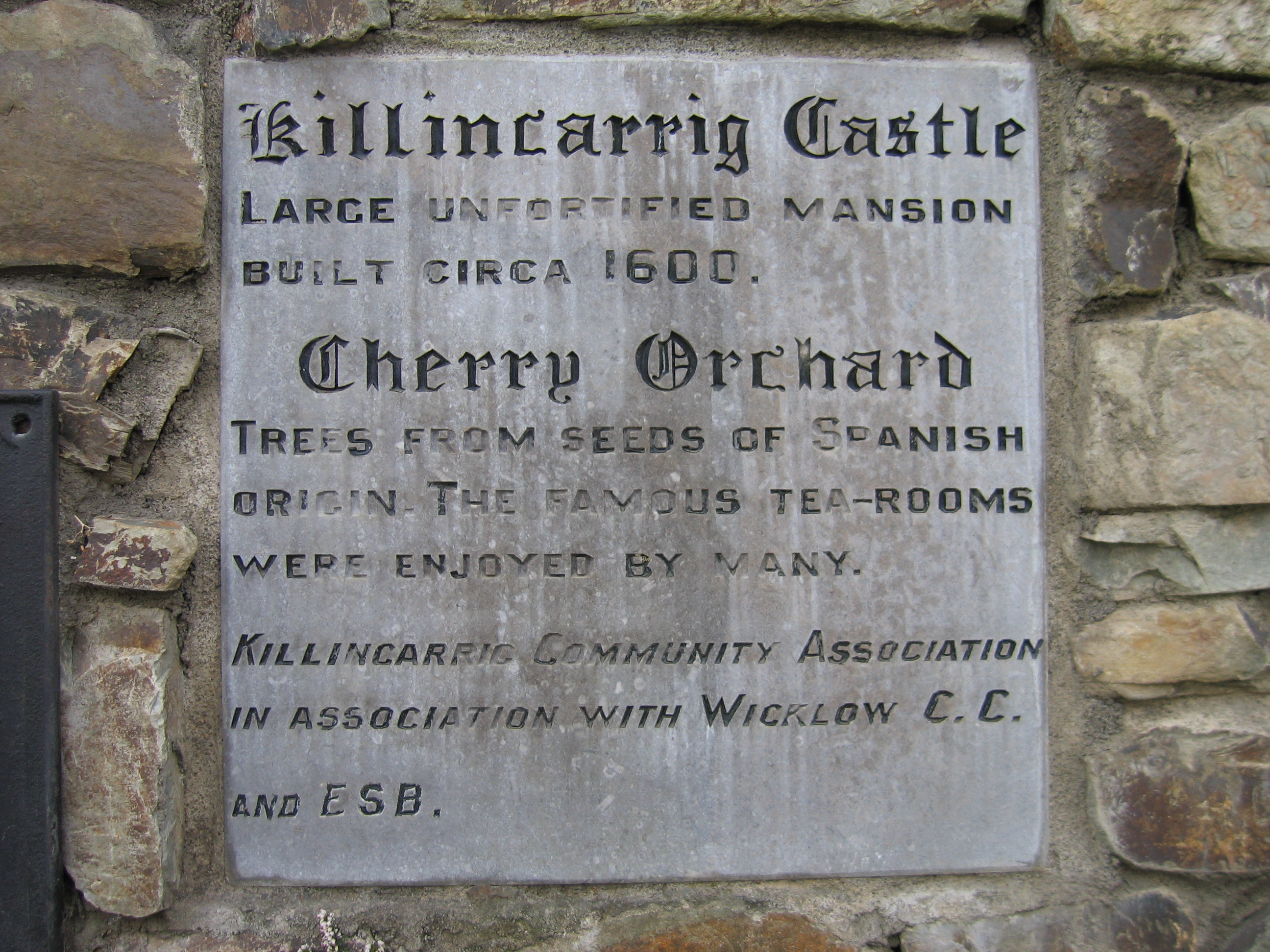
Potted History click photo to read

The story has it that Oliver Cromwell stayed several nights at Killincarrig Castle and that during this stay his horse was stolen by locals. In response, he is said to have set out for Kindlestown Castle. The garrison had fled to Arklow so he sacked it before following them south to Arklow to continue the fight.

Today Killincarrig Castle it's surrounded on three corners by private houses, and the land on which it sits is privately owned.

=== The Old Mill ===
The Old Mill is now a dilapidated building visible behind the Aldi supermarket on Mill Road. Killincarrig’s Mill tells the story of the economy of the time. Foster's Corn Law of 1784 brought about a big increase in the production of grain in Ireland. Ordnance Survey maps from 1840 show four corn mills around Greystones. The earliest mention of Killincarrig’s mill was in 1837 Lewis Topographical Directory under the heading of 'Killincarrig'. Lewis notes that “Arthur Jones Esq” has “an extensive mill here”. Later it was known as Courtney's Mill. It became part of the Burnaby Estate and now belongs to Wicklow County Council.

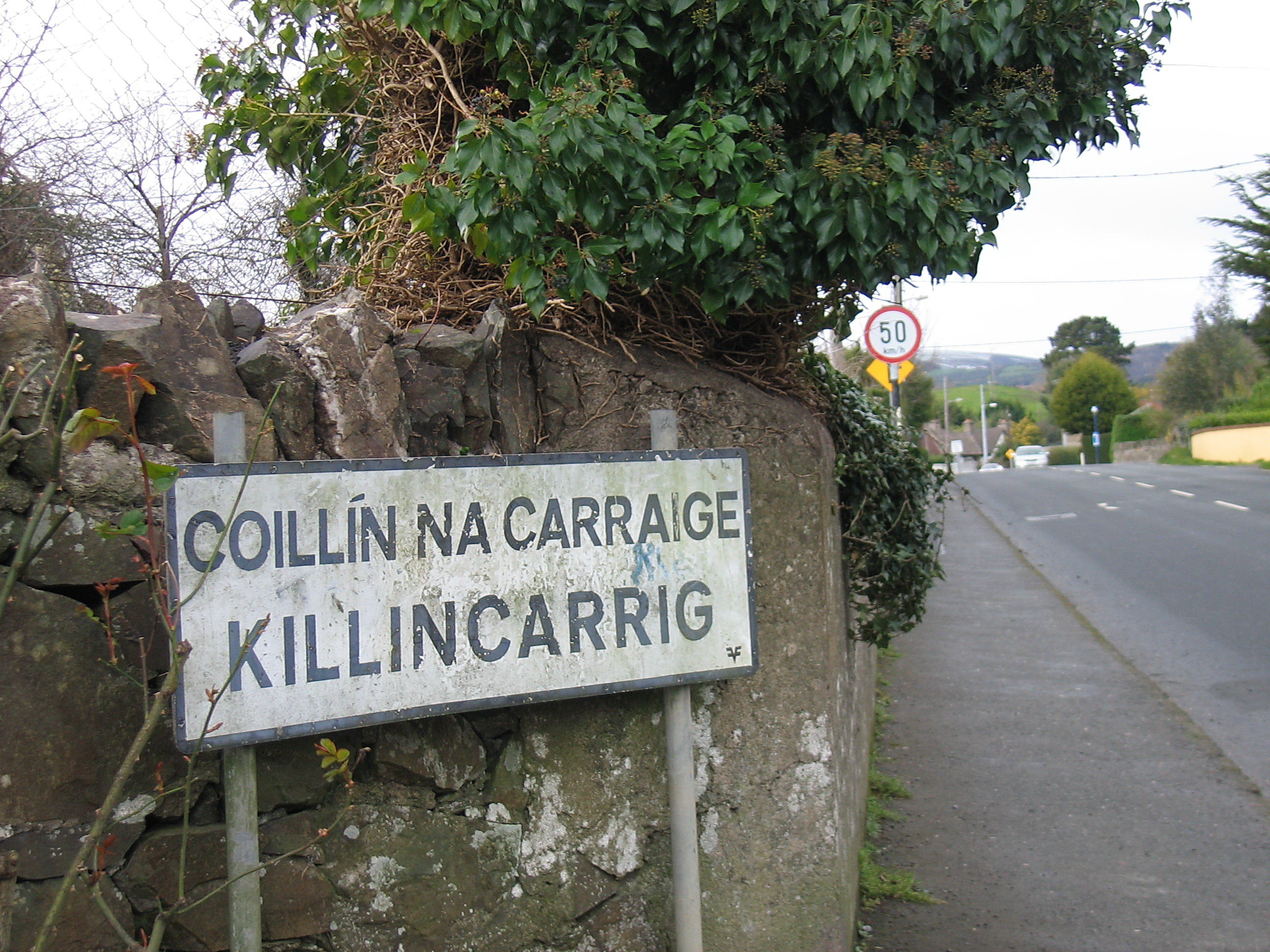
Killincarrig approaching from Greystones on the R762

=== The Hawkins Whitshed family ===
Killincarrig's landowner at one time was the Hawkins Whitshed family. They owned the first Killincarrick House, which was demolished at the end of the 19th century and is now the location of Greystones Golf Club. The Hawkins Whitshed family built a new Killincarrick House (Later became The Woodlands Hotel) closer to Greystones village, which was home to the trailblazing Mountaineer Elizabeth Hawkins-Whitshed. Note that there is a third Killincarrig House that was gifted to Hawkins-Whitshed’s farm manager, Wilfred Evans, in the 1960s. It was already in disrepair and since then has lain vacant.
