= David and Stephen Flynn =

Irish business people

David and Stephen Flynn (born 12 December 1979), also known as The Happy Pear Twins, are Irish business people, chefs, and media personalities.

== Early life and education ==
David and Stephen Flynn were born on 12 December 1979 in Calgary, Alberta to Irish parents. The family returned to Ireland six months later and settled in Greystones, County Wicklow, where the brothers were raised. They attended St Laurence's and St Kevin's National Schools, followed by Presentation College in Bray. During school, they were both active in sports and received accolades including Rugby Player of the Year and Sportsman of the Year in their final year of secondary school.

Stephen Flynn earned a Bachelor of Commerce and a Master's in E-Commerce at University College Dublin. David studied Business at Dublin Institute of Technology. After university, they travelled extensively — David spent time in South Africa intending to pursue a career as a professional golfer, while Stephen worked as a snowboard instructor in Canada. During this time they became interested in plant-based diets and the connection between food, health, and sustainability.

== Careers ==
In 2004, they opened the Happy Pear Café and Natural Food Shop in Greystones, County Wicklow. At its peak, the business employed 200 people in 4 locations. By 2021 this decreased had to 72 people, with several locations closing.

They have published several cookbooks, and won the 2016 Avonmore Cookbook of the Year Award at the Irish Book Awards.. Their first cookbook, The Happy Pear: Recipes and Stories from the First Ten Years (2014), became a national bestseller in Ireland..The twins won the 2021 celebrity edition of Ireland's Fittest Family.

In 2015, the Flynn brothers joined Jamie Oliver's FoodTube network to promote plant-based cooking. In 2019, they opened a fully plant-based Happy Pear café in Dublin Airport.

They have a large online social media presence, including more than 1,000,000 Instagram followers.

== Medical misinformation ==
The Flynns have received international criticism for making unfounded medical claims. In an April 2022 video, they made incorrect claims about breast cancer rates and falsely stated that certain foods could prevent cancer. Their statements were widely condemned, including by cancer surgeon Liz O'Riordan and cancer scientist David Robert Grimes who described the video as "irresponsible". The twins later admitted they had made a mistake and were ignorant before deleting the video.

They also appeared on Ray D'Arcy's national radio show to apologise. They discussed their apology video, which received criticism from some for appearing insincere; however, they explained that their nervousness contributed to that impression. They promised to "stick with our own expertise" in the future.

In April 2023, they issued another apology for an episode of their podcast on which they admitted they had misled and misinformed listeners, adding it 'will not happen again'. In a statement to the Irish Independent, a spokesperson said: "The Happy Pear acknowledges that some of the content in a recent reel post across some of our social media platforms in relation to a podcast with US-based Dr Zac [sic] Bush MD, has caused offence, with some statements not given the appropriate qualification or context. It was never the intention to mislead or to misinform and we sincerely apologise for any offence caused." In the show, Bush had made incorrect claims about the effects of antibiotics on mental health. Bush has been described as a pseudoscientist, a COVID denier, and a denier of germ theory. The podcast claims were widely refuted, including by medical consultant, Niamh Lynch.

== Personal lives ==
Stephen is married to Justyna, a child psychologist from Poland. They have three children. David has two children with his ex-wife, Janet. David remarried in 2022 to Sabrina from Belgium. They have one child.

The Flynns have been compared to fellow celebrity Irish twins Jedward and as a result have been nicknamed "Hummus Jedward" and "Vegward".

== Books ==
- Flynn, David; Flynn, Stephen (2016). The Happy Pear: Make healthy eating easy with this vegetarian cookbook full of delicious recipes for everyday. Penguin UK. ISBN 978-1-84488-376-9.
- Flynn, David; Flynn, Stephen (2016). The World of the Happy Pear: Over 100 Simple, Tasty Plant-based Recipes for a Happier, Healthier You. Penguin UK. ISBN 978-0-241-97696-8.
- Flynn, David; Flynn, Stephen (2018). The Happy Pear: Recipes for Happiness: A delicious, easy vegetarian cookbook with healthy recipes for the whole family. Penguin UK. ISBN 978-1-84488-426-1.
- Flynn, David; Flynn, Stephen (2020). The Happy Pear: Vegan Cooking for Everyone: An easy cookbook with over 200 delicious plant based recipes for everyone. Penguin UK. ISBN 978-0-241-98759-9.
