= Greystones =

Town in County Wicklow, Ireland

Greystones Na Clocha Liatha (Irish)
- Town
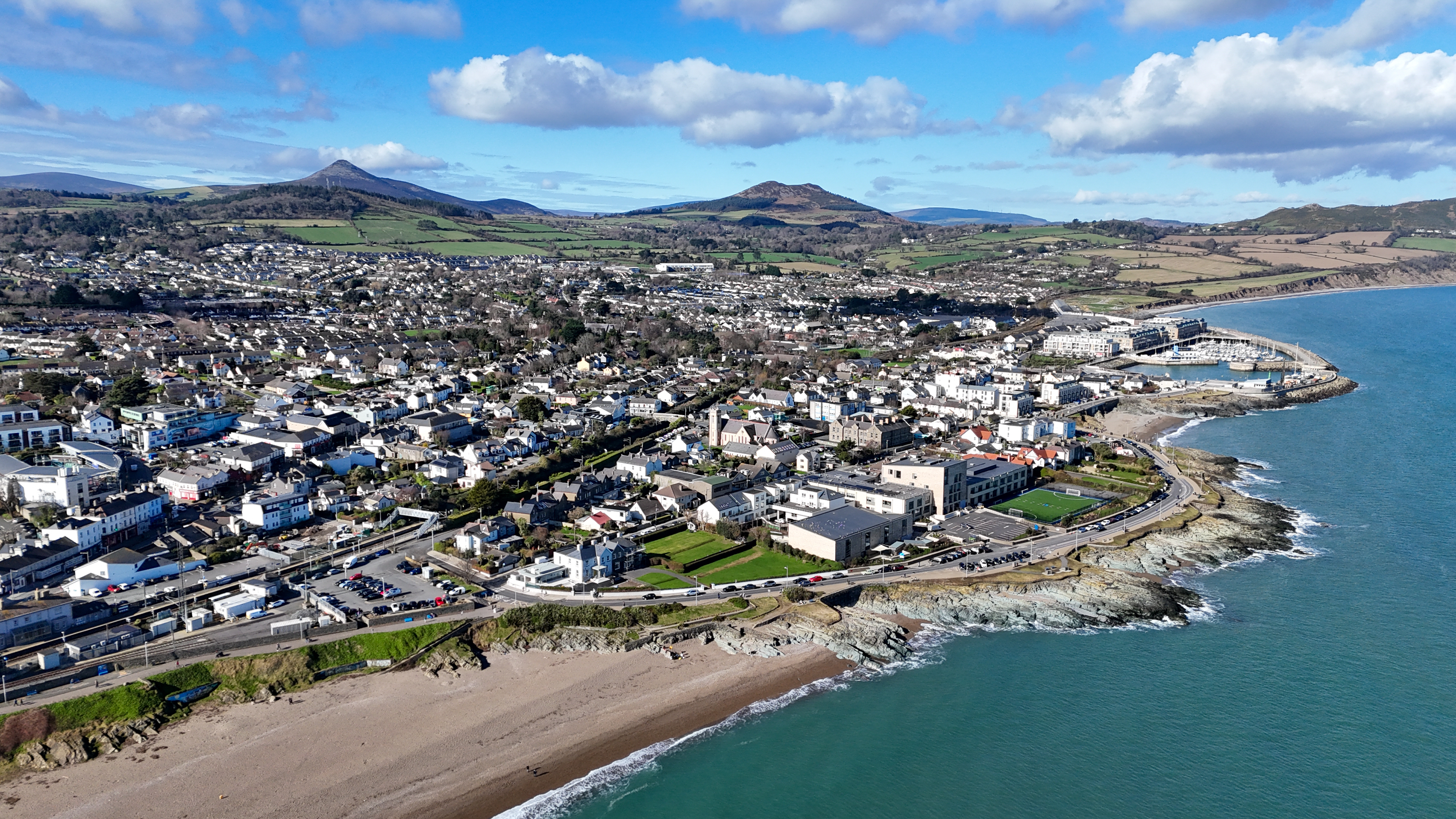
- Greystones skyline

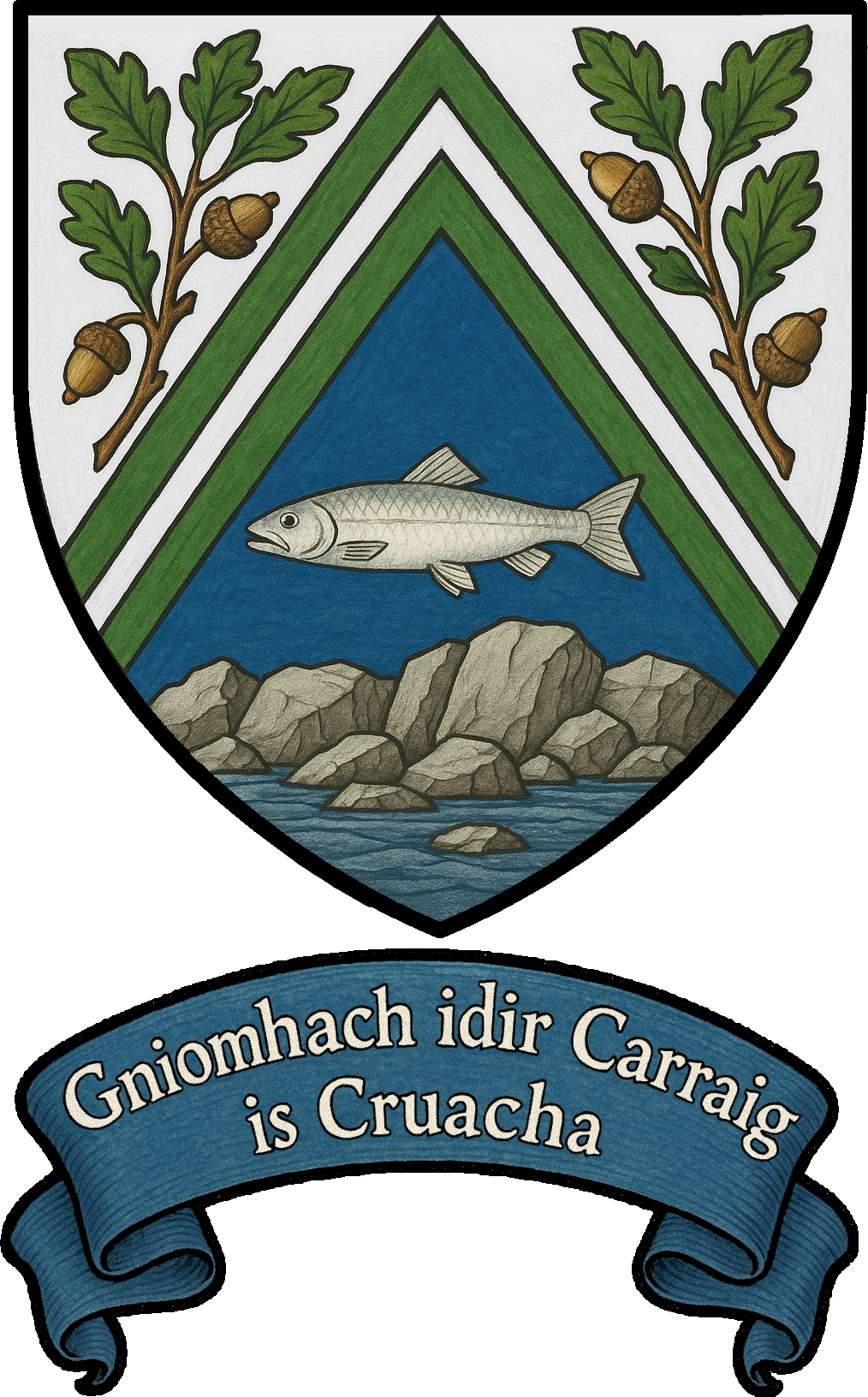
- Coat of arms
- Motto(s): Gníomhach idir Carraig is Cruacha; Active between rock and mountain peaks
- Location in Ireland
- Coordinates: 53.144°N 6.072°W
- Country: Ireland
- Province: Leinster
- County: County Wicklow
- Elevation: 50 m (160 ft)

Population (2022)
  - Total: 22,009
  - Rank: 22nd
  - Ethnicity 2016 census: Ethnic groups: 95.12% White; 84.75% White Irish; 10.24% White Other; 0.13% Irish Traveller; 1.76% Asian/Asian Irish; 0.32% Black/Black Irish; 1.42% Other; 1.36% Not Stated
- Demonym: Greystonian
- Time zone: UTC±0 (WET)
  - Summer (DST): UTC+1 (IST)
- Eircode routing key: A63
- Telephone area code: +353(0)1
- Irish Grid Reference: O297122
- Website: greystones.ie

Greystones (Irish: Na Clocha Liatha) is a coastal town and seaside resort in County Wicklow, Ireland. It lies on Ireland's east coast, 3.5 km (2.2 mi) south of Bray and 24 km (15 mi) south of Dublin city centre and has a population of 22,009, according to the 2022 census. The town is bordered by the Irish Sea to the east, Bray Head to the north and the Wicklow Mountains to the west. It is the second largest town in County Wicklow (after Bray).

The town was named after a half-mile or one-kilometre stretch of grey stones between two beaches on the seafront. The harbour area and Greystones railway station are at the northern and southern ends respectively. The North Beach, which begins at the harbour, is a stony beach, and some of its length is overlooked by the southern cliffs of Bray Head, which are subject to erosion. The South Beach is a broad sandy beach about one kilometre long. It is a Blue Flag beach and receives many visitors and tourists, mainly in the summertime.

In 2008, Greystones was named as the world's "most liveable community" at the LivCom Awards in China. The community received the same award again in 2021.

== History ==
Greystones is located south of the site of an ancient castle of the Barony of Rathdown. There was a hamlet which, like Rathdown Castle, was known as Rathdown, and which appeared on a 1712 map. This site occupied an area now known as the Grove, north of Greystones harbour, but only the ruins of a chapel, St. Crispin's Cell, survive. Greystones is a much more recent settlement and is first mentioned in Topographia Hibernica by Wm. Wenman Seward, a 1795 publication. Here it is described as a "noted fishing place four miles beyond Bray."

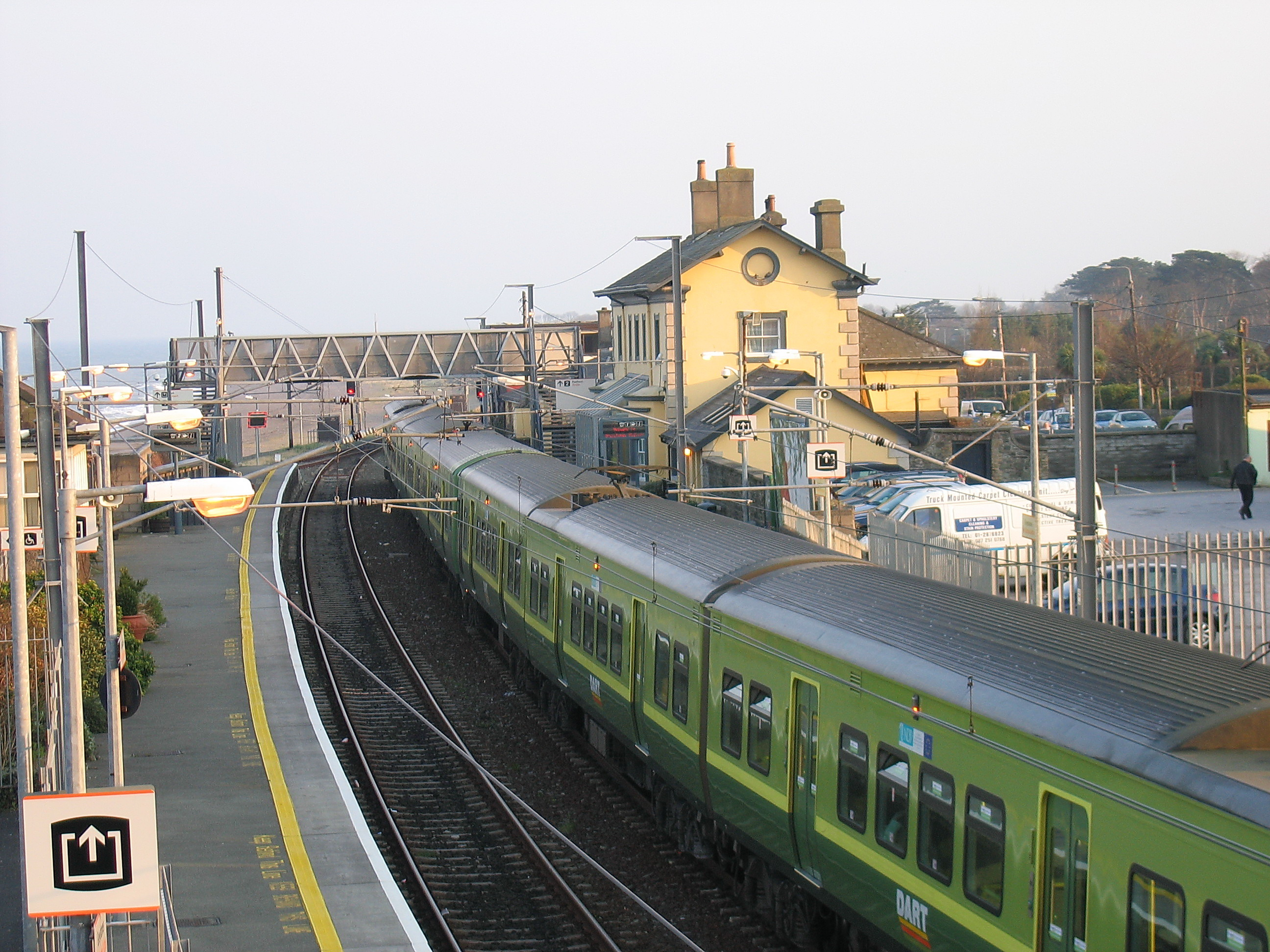
DART train at Greystones Station

In the early 19th century, there were some families scattered around the harbour, Blacklion, Windgates, Killincarrig and Rathdown. Delgany was a more substantial and longer-established village. However, Greystones was put on the map with the coming of the railway in 1855, a difficult undertaking which was performed in consultation with the engineer Isambard Kingdom Brunel. The railway station was built on the line dividing the properties of two landowners: the La Touche family of Bellevue House (now in ruins, near Delgany), and the Hawkins-Whitshed family of Killincarrig House (which is now Greystones Golf Club). It provided links with Bray and Dublin and left room for development on the adjoining estates.

Elizabeth Hawkins-Whitshed (better known as Lizzie Le Blond) owned the Hawkins-Whitshed estate from 1871 and she developed Ireland's first planned housing estate, an area currently known as the Burnaby. She was a mountaineer and explorer, a photographer, an author of mountaineering books, fiction, travel writing and a filmmaker. She donated, for a nominal rent, the site upon which the library in Greystones is built. Her first marriage to Frederick Gustavus Burnaby was short-lived and he is only known to have visited Wicklow once; However the area is still given his surname. An adjoining estate to that of Elizabeth Hawkins-Whitshed was owned by the La Touche Family. It was during the time William Robert La Touche owned the estate that Greystones developed rapidly. To the north of the station, Church Road, Victoria Road and Trafalgar Road were laid out, and many houses were built. In the early 20th century, the Burnabys began to expand the town on their side of the station, and the roads and houses of the Burnaby were developed and the population grew. The names of these two families are reflected on the names of several roads and housing estates in the area.

Between 1885 and 1897, the people of Greystones campaigned for a harbour to aid the fishing industry and imports such as coal. The original pier, dock, sea wall and boat slip remained pre-2009 but had endured substantial damage. In the early 20th century, the town felt the effects of coastal erosion (which is still a major problem); the loss of fields and most of the houses on the North Beach Road, and the costly inland relocation of the railway have all resulted. In 1968, the old Kish lighthouse foundation was added to the end of the pier.

At the end of World War II, cars and petrol became widely available, allowing Greystones to gradually expand, filling in space between itself and outlying areas such as Blacklion, Killincarrig and Delgany. However, the popularity of the railway declined; its very existence being in jeopardy during the 1980s, as government cutbacks reduced the service to just a few trains per day. The 1990s brought a revival with the arrival of the electrified DART from Bray, and a much more frequent schedule.

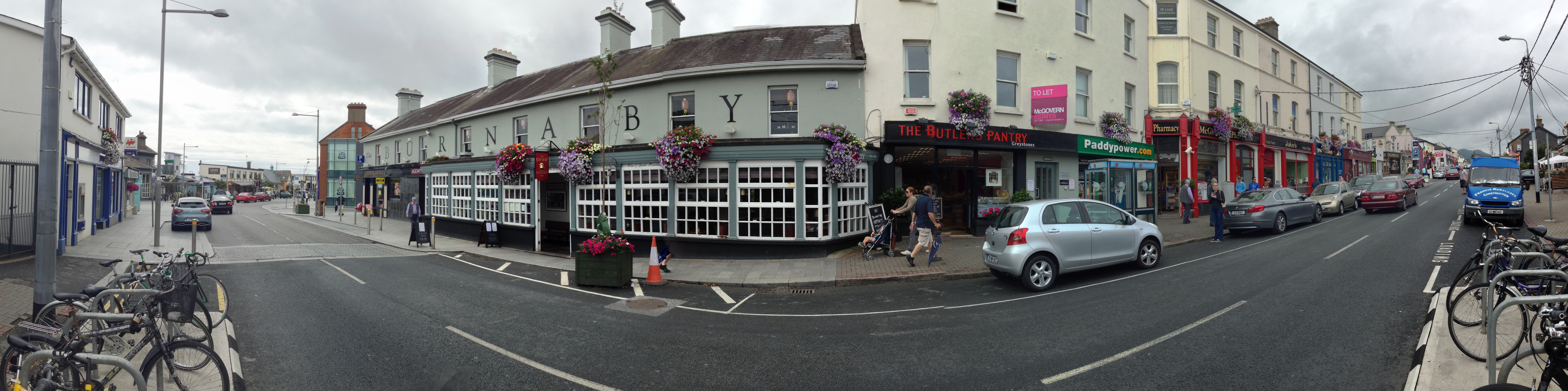
Greystones panorama

== Population and development ==
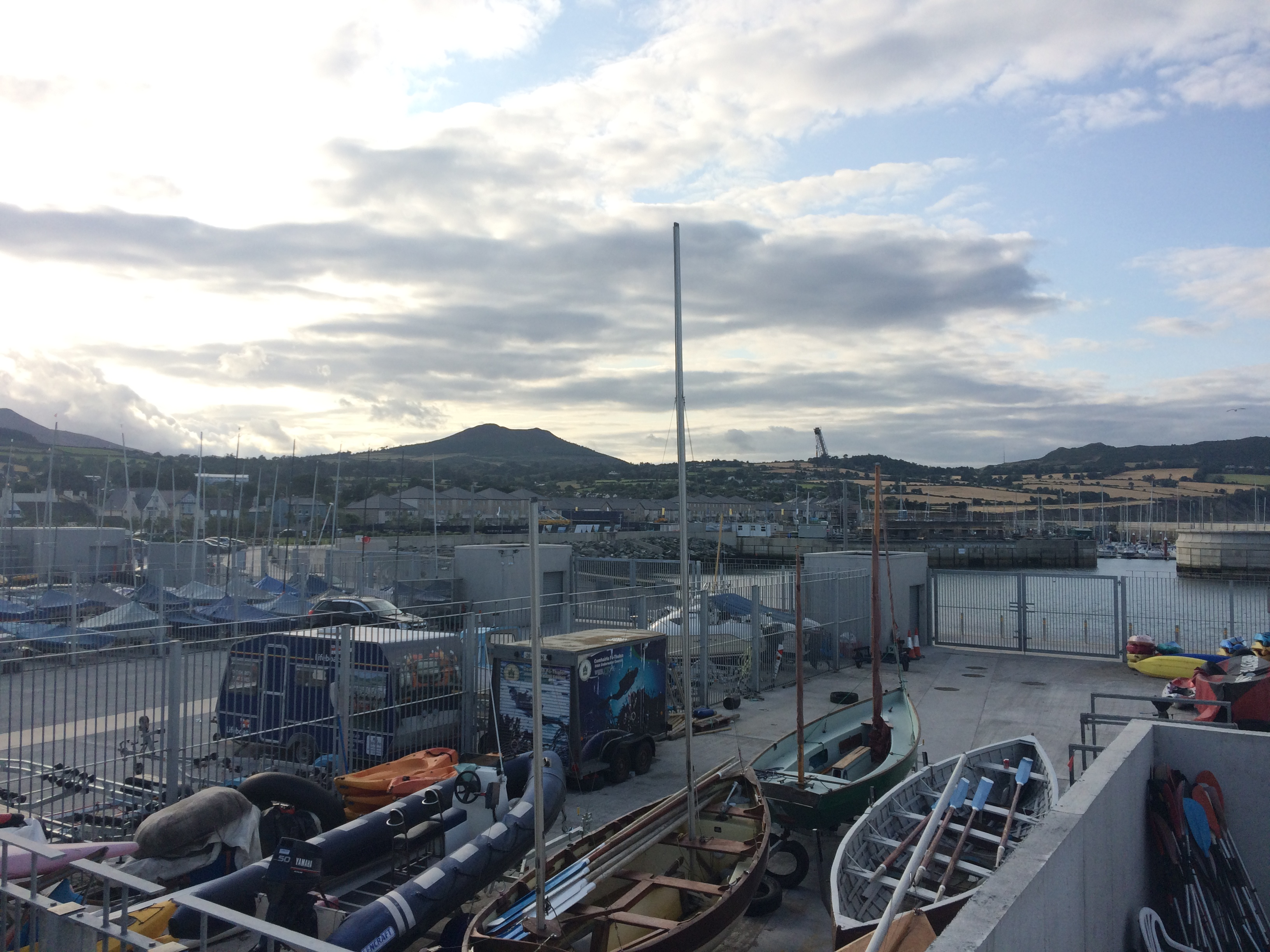
Greystones Harbour

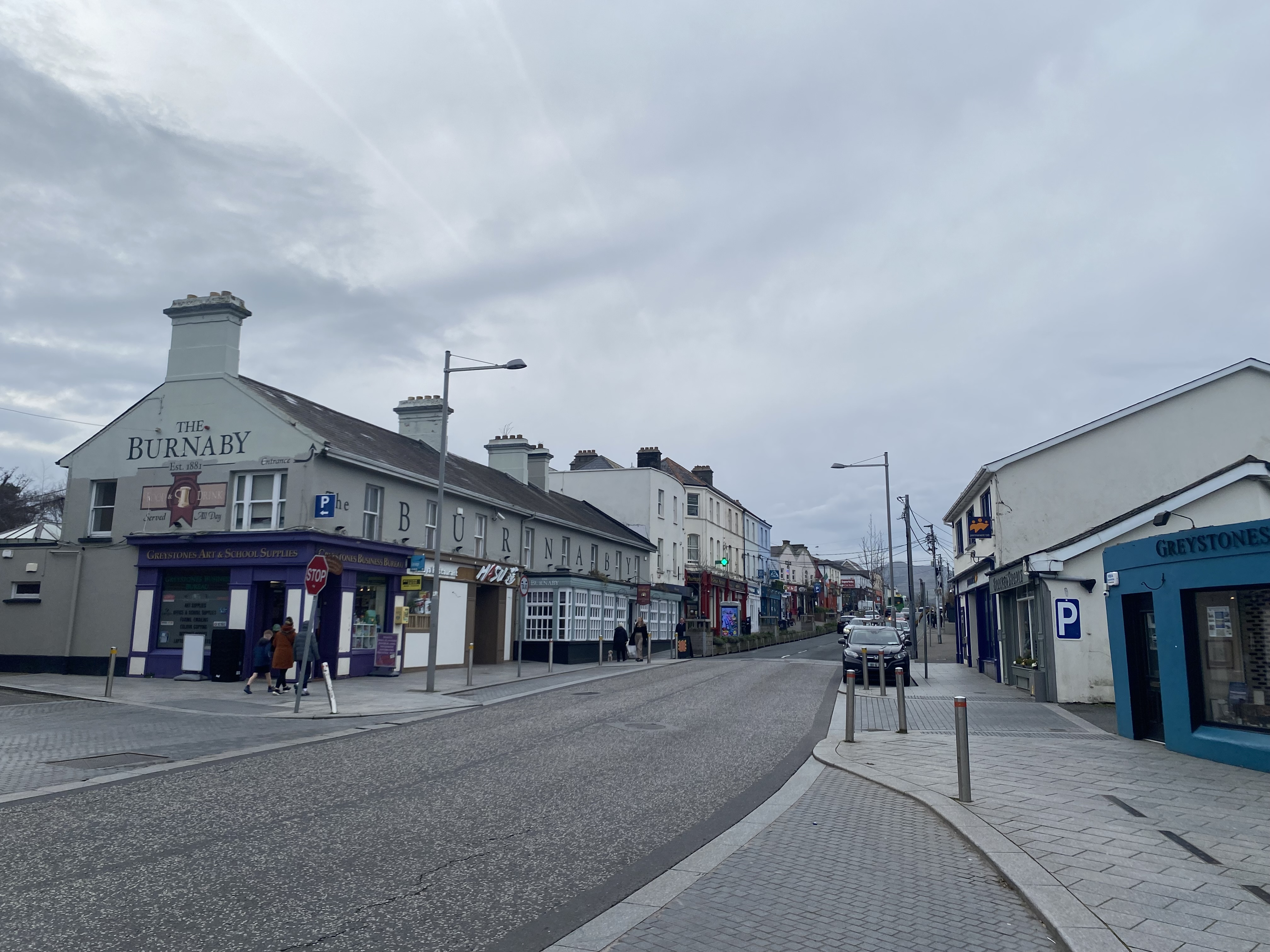
Church Road, the main street of Greystones

Greystones has experienced a large increase in its population since the 1970s with the construction of mainly large housing estates. The first of these periods lasted for around a decade seeing the development of estates like Hillside, Applewood Heights, Redford Park and other smaller ones like Burnaby Park. The second boom in construction came during the Celtic Tiger period of the early 2000s which saw developments such as Charlesland (the biggest) just south of the town, which includes over 1,000 units. Following the 2008 financial crisis little development took place, evident in the difference between the 2011 census and the 2016 census; an increase of only 1,000.

As of 2018, Greystones was experiencing a housing boom. A number of large-scale developments were taking place, mainly on the western fringes of the town, in the harbour area and around Charlesland. The main schemes included Seagreen and Waverly in Blacklion, Glenheron and Archer's Wood beside Charlesland and Marina village at the harbour. As of 2021, there were also multiple other similar schemes approved or pending approval. These new developments resulted in a population increase of almost 4000 between 2016 and 2022.

As of the 2022 census, the population of Greystones–Delgany stood at 22,009, making it the second largest town in the county after Bray. In 2016, the Greystones Municipal District Population stood at 26,323.

Wicklow County Council and Greystones Municipal District Council plan for at least 24,000 by 2028 in the town itself.

Along with the housing developments, road networks and facilities have been "improved" to cater for the growth. The road between Greystones and Bray has been slightly widened and realigned. A dual carriageway link road (R774) connecting Greystones to the N11 has been completed to the south of the town. Construction of a full interchange with the N11 has also been completed. Chapel Road has been connected with Blacklion Manor Road forming a new section of wide higher capacity road from the junction at Lidl to the junction with the top of Applewood Heights, creating a complete bottleneck at Delgany village. Estates like Seagreen access from this road.

== Transport ==
=== Road ===
Greystones is accessible from the N11 Dublin–Wexford road; via an interchange (Junction 11 on the N11) near Charlesland connects with the town via a dual carriageway. This quickly changes into the M11. This then joins onto the M50 (Dublin's orbital motorway) about 10 km north. There is an interchange in Bray (J7) that has a link road to Greystones from the north

=== Rail ===
Greystones railway station, which opened on 30 October 1855, is the southern terminus of the DART railway line, a service which connects thirty-one stations along Dublin's east coast. Iarnród Éireann diesel Commuter and InterCity trains also serve Greystones, linking the town with Wicklow, Arklow, Gorey, Wexford, and Rosslare Europort to the south, and Dublin's Connolly Station to the north.

=== Bus ===
Prior to the introduction of Phase 6a of the Dublin BusConnects programme, Greystones was served by Dublin Bus services 84 (Newcastle-Kilcoole-Greystones-Southern Cross-N11-Brides Glen Luas stop-Blackrock), with route variation 84a operating at peak times between Bray Station and Blackrock), Express route 84X (Newcastle-Sea Road, Kilcoole-Greystones-Southern Cross-N11-Eden Quay), and Go-Ahead Ireland service 184 (Newtownmountkennedy-Kilpedder-Ballydonagh Road-Delgany-Greystones-Bray Station).

As of 26th January, 2025, these routes were replaced with Go-Ahead Ireland services L1, L2 and L3 and Dublin Bus services X1 and X2.

Route L1 is similar to former route 184, but excludes the N11 loop to Ballydonagh Road and instead continues from Kilpedder into Delgany. The L1 also does not serve the Charlesland loop, which is now part of route L2, which continues along the R774 towards Greystones or Kilcoole, only serving one of the two Charlesland stops on either side of the road. The L1 instead continues towards Greystones and Bray as per route 184. The L1 stays on the R762 through Greystones until it turns left onto Bellevue Road, heading west, serving Greystones Shopping Centre. The L1 then turns right onto the R761 and continues north until Bray, where it turns onto Quinsborough Road to terminate at Bray Station, as per route 184.

Route L2 incorporates the start of former routes 84/x and, beginning in Newcastle, serves Kilcoole and the Sea Road loop (formerly 84x) and continues as per previous route 84 until Knockroe Roundabout, the intersection between the R761 and R774. Here, the L2 continues east on the R774, onto a newly designated bus corridor, serving new stops 8279 (Northbound) and 8281 (Southbound) at Greystones CNS and Hawkins Wood. It then links to the Charlesland stop which is no longer served as part of the Charlesland loop. The L2 continues along the R774 until Mill Road Roundabout, where it joins the L1, continuing on the R762 until Greystones and Bray as per route 184. From this point, routes L1 and L2 are the same, and work together to provide a 15 minute gap between bus services between Greystones and Bray. These services both terminate at Bray Station.

Route L3 commences at Glenbrook Park, which used to be served by route 84. As the L2 deviates from the 84’s route down the R774, the L3 replaces the remainder of the 84’s service in the Greystones area. It travels from Glenbrook Park, north along the R761. It then joins the L1 at the R761/R762 interchange roundabouts and continues as per the L1 (being joined by the L2 at Mill Road Roundabout) as far as Stop 4284- Greystones Village, after which it turns right onto La Touche Place, continuing to serve the same route as route 84. It heads along Trafalgar Road towards Greystones Marina and then along Victoria road past Greystones Fire Station, then turning right at the end of the R762. From here it rejoins routes L1 and L2 on the R761 at Rathdown Lawn and continues as far as Blacklion Shopping Centre to the north of Greystones. Instead of continuing towards Southern Cross Road as per route 84, the L3 turns left onto another new bus corridor towards Chapel Road. It serves new stops 8287, 8288, 8289 (Northwestbound); 8284, 8285, 8286 (Southeastbound) until terminating at the Nurseries, Stop 8283.

Dublin Bus route X1 commences at Stop 4307, Sea Road, Kilcoole (formerly served by route 84 and now also served by route L2 in both northerly and southerly directions as part of the Sea Road loop). From here, the X1 continues as per previous route 84x through Kilcoole, Killincarrig, Greystones, Victoria Road, Southern Cross Road, N11 and R138 to terminate at Hawkins Street on the Southside (commencing stop of 84x southbound), instead of continuing up to the Eden Quay terminus of the northbound 84x.

The X2 is as per route X1 apart from two deviations. Instead of commencing at Sea Road, it does so at the terminus of the L2 in Newcastle. It skips the Sea Road loop and continues on the same route as the X1 until the N11, where it takes the sliproad onto the R118 (Wyattville Road) and serves Brides Glen Luas as per route 84. There is some controversy with this route planning due to the X2 being an Express route. Some say that this defeats the purpose of the route’s Express designation as it is a costly detour in terms of time, especially during peak traffic hours. However, it provides the only connection from Newcastle, Kilcoole and Greystones to Brides Glen the Luas Green Line, which is still availed of by commuters. The X2 then rejoins the N11 and continues to Hawkins Street as per route X1.

The X1 and X2 are now the only services that directly link Greystones to Southern Cross Road. Blackrock is also no longer directly connected to Greystones and Bray due to the removal of routes 84/a. The X1 and X2 also only run on weekdays at peak times in the morning and evening, like the 84a/x, which may cause inconvenience for some travelers who previously would have travelled between these destinations outside of peak hours.

There is still one pre-BusConnects route that remains in Greystones, Dublin Bus route 84n. This route runs from Dublin City Centre on Friday and Saturday nights (technically Saturday and Sunday mornings). There are three services each morning that depart D’Olier street at 00:00, 02:00 and 04:00. The 84n then travels through Ringsend and Sandymount before joining the R118 at St. Vincent’s University Hospital. From here, it travels along the R118 through Booterstown and Blackrock, before heading along the R827 through Deansgrange. It then joins the N11 at Cornelscourt, passes through Shankill, Bray and Ballywaltrim (via Boghall Road), before following the 84’s old route as far as Mill Road Roundabout. Here, it turns onto the R774 and terminates at the Northbound Charlesland stop, Stop 7461. As of 1st January 2017, Aircoach route 702 (note that 7xx denotes an Airport route in Ireland) ran from Greystones to Dublin Airport through Bray, Shankill, Dalkey, Booterstown, Ballsbridge and Dublin Port Tunnel. Along its route to and from Greystones, the 702 served Blacklion Shopping Centre, Greystones Station and Charlesland before terminating at Hawkins Wood, following an expansion in 2024 due the completion of the building of Hawkins Wood. When Phase 6a of BusConnects was introduced on 26th January, 2025, the 702 remained as part of Greystones’ bus network, along with the 84n. The routes 84/a/x and 184 were replaced by Local routes L1, L2 and L3, and Express routes X1 and X2. Shortly after, however, on 2nd March 2025, the 702’s service was discontinued in Greystones, Bray and Shankill, due to low passenger demand. It now only runs to and from Dalkey, following the same route.

=== Walking ===
Bray and Greystones are linked by a Cliff Walk, which follows the route of the railway line around Bray Head. The walk is 6 km long and takes approximately two hours. However this walk was closed in February of 2021, this was because of rockfall and, as of May 2026 it has not reopened

== Administration ==
Greystones is part of the Dáil constituency of Wicklow and the European Parliament constituency of South.

In local government, the Greystones local electoral area (LEA) elects six councillors to Wicklow County Council who sit as Greystones Municipal District. This LEA also includes the neighbouring villages of Delgany, Kilcoole and Newcastle Lower.

In 1984, Greystones was granted town commissioners. This became a town council in 2002. All town councils in Ireland were abolished in 2014.

== Development ==
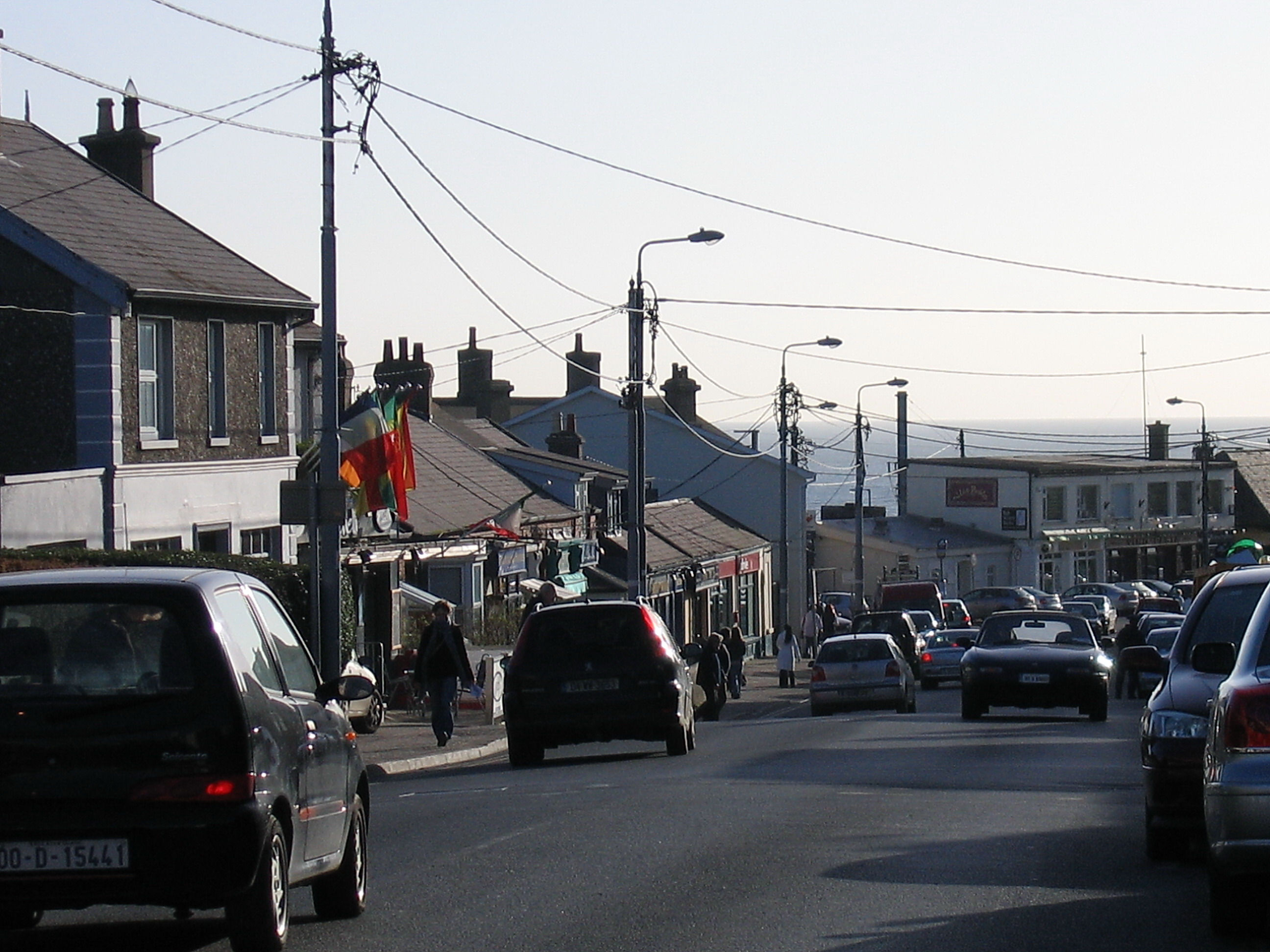
Main Street wirescape

=== Marina ===
A €300 million redevelopment scheme for the harbour was proposed by the Sispar consortium (Sispar is a joint venture consortium of Sisk and Michael Cotter's Park Developments) in a public-private partnership with Wicklow County Council. This development was a topical issue in the town, with objections revolving around the privatisation of public beachfront land without a broad public agreement. The development includes a new harbour, 341 apartments, a 230 berth marina, a new public plaza and facilities for local sporting clubs.

On the granting of planning permission, 6,210 submissions were received by An Bord Pleanála on initial plans, of which more than 6,200 were objections. Many of the objections came from outside County Wicklow, according to a spokesman for Wicklow County Council. Many objected to specifics of the plan while approving the general idea. An oral hearing was held and the board requested the developers to make certain changes which resulted in the plans being scaled down by approximately 10%. Some 3,700 objections were made on these updated plans. On 9 August 2007, the board approved the final plans, while imposing 13 conditions on construction works, including the retention of public access to the Cliff Walk during the development period, strict guidelines in relation to dust suppression, the re-use of demolition materials, and limitations on the hours of operation and noise levels. The board also overruled an earlier inspector's report, instead permitting an old unlicensed landfill to remain beside the new apartments.

In February 2010, it was announced that development of the marina would be paused indefinitely due to conditions in the Irish property market.

After the development plans stalled, the loans attached to the development were transferred to NAMA. Sispar insisted that it needed funding from NAMA to finish the project. In September 2012 it was reported that NAMA had written off €50m owed for the troubled development of Greystones Harbour. It appeared that it was not the Sispar consortium but Sisk alone that controlled the loans.

Almost all of the new harbour facilities are now in use and available to the public, while the construction of apartments is ongoing.

== Sports ==
=== Association football ===
The town is home the association football club Greystones United, which is based at Woodlands near the south beach. GUFC is the largest schoolboy/girl football club in the country and has in excess of 700 members. Among the club's former players is retired Irish international Paul McShane. Another club, Greystones AFC, is located at 'The Arch Field' beside the railway bridge at the harbour. Five of their players have represented Ireland at various levels. Ian Horan, Chris Mason and Stephen McCann represented the Irish Intermediate team and Stephen Roche and Richie O'Hanlon represented the Irish Colleges team.

=== Gaelic games ===
Éire Óg Greystones GAA club is located on Mill Road, at the south end of the town. In the early 21st century, the club undertook development and improvement works on the clubhouse, pitches, lighting and parking facilities.

=== Golf ===
There are two 18-hole golf courses and a driving range within the town. Greystones Golf Club, which was founded in 1895, overlooks the town, the countryside, and the Irish Sea. Charlesland Golf Club is newer, flatter, and located by the sea. There are other courses at Delgany, Glen of the Downs, Kilcoole, Druids Glen, and Bray.

=== Marine ===
Greystones has many marine-based clubs including sailing and wind-surfing, angling, diving, rowing and Sea Scouts. Greystones rowing club, for example, was established in 1920.

Shore angling for cod and plaice at the beaches and the harbour attracts visitors during the summer. Swimming is also popular in warmer weather, especially on the south beach.

=== Rugby ===
Greystones RFC is a rugby union team which participates in the All-Ireland League.

=== Tennis ===
Greystones Lawn Tennis Club has 12 outdoor floodlit courts and a clubhouse located on Mill Road at the south end of the town. It has hosted several regional and national competitions. As of 2023, 3 of the courts have been transformed to artificial clay courts.

=== Other sports ===
There is a lawn bowling club located at Burnaby Park. Greystones is also home to the Greystones Mariners Baseball Club, which competes nationally and which has seen several members represent the Irish national baseball team.

Greystones Cricket (formed in 2012), practices (nets) at Greystones RFC and play their home matches at the Greystones United F.C. grounds. They have three senior men's teams and one ladies' team playing in the Leinster Cricket Union competitions, a taverners and two junior teams.

St. Kilian's Badminton Club plays in Shoreline Leisure Centre on Mill Road.

Greystones has seen a rise in community-driven wellness activities along its coast. Sea swimming groups like “Swimrise” have become increasingly popular, promoting cold-water immersion for physical and mental wellbeing. Mobile and barrel saunas have also been launched in the area.

== Community and wellness ==
The town is also known for its popular sunrise sea swimming community, sometimes referred to as “Swimrise,” which has been featured in national media for its wellness benefits and community spirit.

== Religion ==
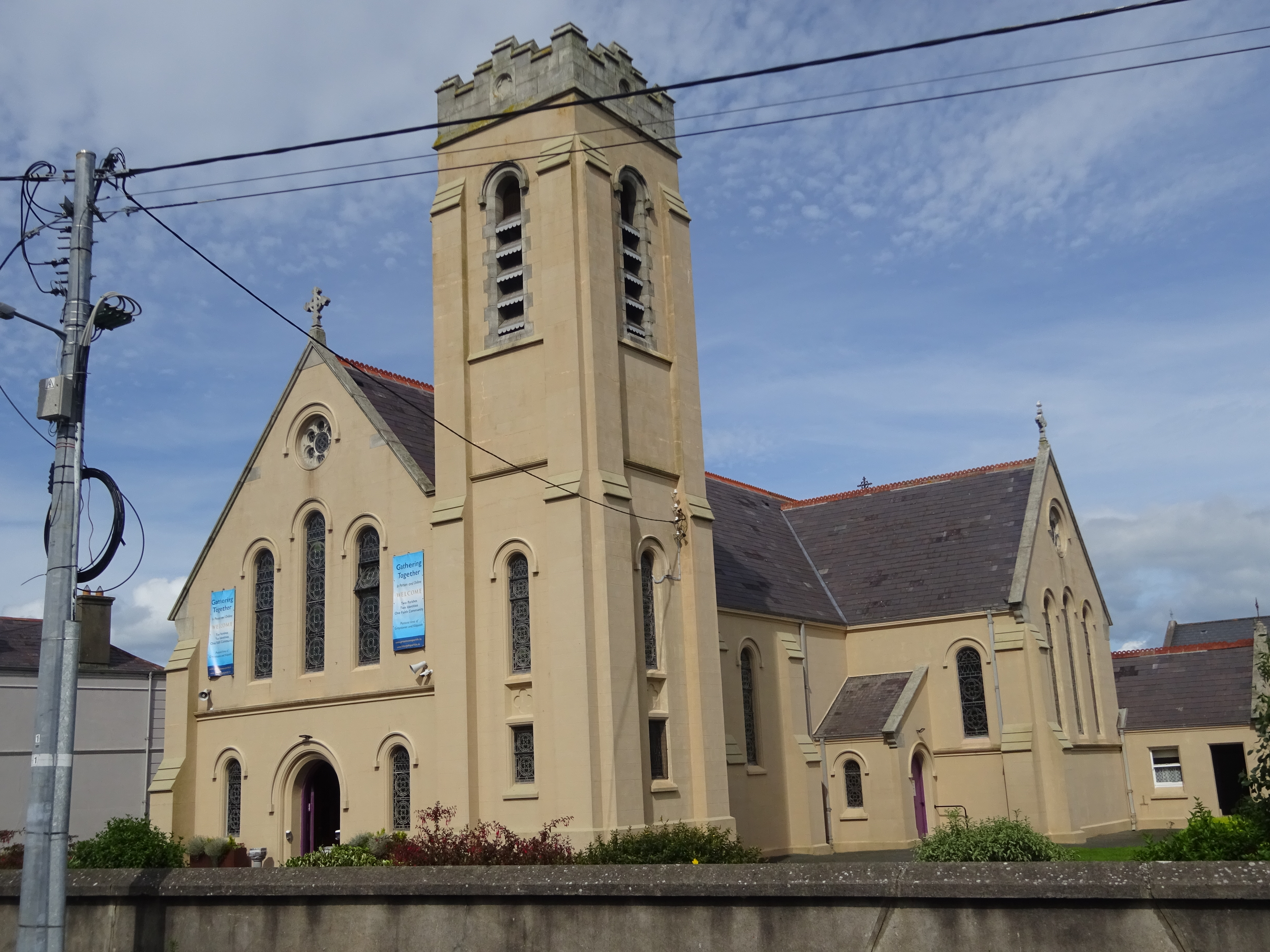
Holy Rosary Catholic Church

Greystones has a variety of Christian denominations in the locality, with most divisions of mainstream Christianity represented. There is a Roman Catholic, a Presbyterian, a Church of Ireland, an Evangelical, and an Evangelical Arminian church in Greystones. Following the Russian invasion of Ukraine in 2022, members of the Ukrainian Orthodox community have moved to the area.

As of the 2022 census, 56% of respondents in Greystones indicated that they were Catholic, 25% had no religion, 14% were of other religions and 5% did not state a religion. While a majority of residents are Catholic, Greystones had (as of the 2016 census) the largest Church of Ireland presence as a proportion of the population (8.2%) anywhere in the country, has the largest proportion of Protestants overall (10.5%). As of 2016, it was also the least religious town in the country (with 18.3% indicating 'no religion').

Carraig Eden Theological College is a Pentecostal centre for theological study and ministerial training in Ireland. It offers BTh and MTh degrees in Applied Theology.

== Education and research ==
Greystones has eight primary schools, including several national schools, an Educate Together primary school, and an Irish-language Gaelscoil. Greystones' eight primary schools are Delgany National School, Gaelscoil na gCloch Liath, Greystones Community National School, Greystones Educate Together National School, St. Brigid's National Catholic School, St. Kevin's National School, St. Laurence's National Catholic School and St. Patrick's National School.

The town also has four secondary schools:

- St. David's Holy Faith Secondary School is a public, co-educational school.
- Temple Carrig School; a Church of Ireland, co-educational secondary school which opened in 2014.
- Greystones Community College, a (non-denominational) secondary school which opened in 2020
- SEK-Dublin, a private international school which offers Middle Years Programme (MYP) and Diploma Programme (DP) courses. It is located in Belvedere Hall and first opened its doors in 1981.

Wicklow County Council manages a Carnegie library opposite Burnaby Park on the main street (Church Road).

== Entertainment ==
Greystones has a number of entertainment facilities; Charlesland Sports and Recreation Park which include a skate park, several all-weather football and basketball courts, a running track and a playground. The Whale Theatre, used for drama, dance, and concerts, is located in the town centre and is supplemented by Greystones Studios, which provide classes, performance space, practice rooms and AV studios.

== Film and television ==
- The Ormonde cinema in Greystones, which closed in July 2007, featured in the Father Ted episode "The Passion of Saint Tibulus" and also in an episode of Custer's Last Standup.
- Greystones featured as a backdrop for some scenes in the popular BBC series Ballykissangel.
- The town was frequently used in the Irish programme Glenroe.
- Parts of the movie Taffin, starring Pierce Brosnan, were filmed in Greystones.
- Greystones featured in an episode of Dream Team, a Sky One soccer soap series.
- Parts of George Gently, a 2007 British detective one-off by BBC, were filmed around the harbour. Martin Shaw starred in the production, which is set in 1960s Britain (Northumberland). The Beach House pub was renamed 'The Mariner's Rest' for the occasion.
- The movie Yesterday's Children, starring Jane Seymour, was filmed in Greystones.

== Economy ==
The Greystones area is the home to several businesses, including The Happy Pear food company and Goldfish Telecom.

Greystones remains the most expensive Eircode (A63) outside of Dublin as of Q2 2021 at €495,000.

== Climate ==
Greystones has an oceanic climate (Köppen: Cfb).

Climate data for Greystones
Month	Jan	Feb	Mar	Apr	May	Jun	Jul	Aug	Sep	Oct	Nov	Dec	Year
Mean daily maximum °C (°F)	8.0 (46.4)	8.0 (46.4)	8.6 (47.5)	9.9 (49.8)	12.3 (54.1)	14.7 (58.5)	16.3 (61.3)	16.6 (61.9)	15.5 (59.9)	13.3 (55.9)	10.5 (50.9)	8.8 (47.8)	11.9 (53.4)
Daily mean °C (°F)	6.6 (43.9)	6.5 (43.7)	7.0 (44.6)	8.4 (47.1)	10.8 (51.4)	13.2 (55.8)	14.8 (58.6)	15.1 (59.2)	13.9 (57.0)	11.9 (53.4)	9.1 (48.4)	7.4 (45.3)	10.4 (50.7)
Mean daily minimum °C (°F)	5.2 (41.4)	5.0 (41.0)	5.4 (41.7)	6.8 (44.2)	9.1 (48.4)	11.6 (52.9)	13.3 (55.9)	13.5 (56.3)	12.4 (54.3)	10.4 (50.7)	7.7 (45.9)	6.0 (42.8)	8.9 (48.0)
Average precipitation mm (inches)	77.4 (3.05)	68.2 (2.69)	63.3 (2.49)	59.7 (2.35)	66.9 (2.63)	68.5 (2.70)	81.9 (3.22)	82.1 (3.23)	81.5 (3.21)	108.9 (4.29)	108.9 (4.29)	94.0 (3.70)	961.3 (37.85)
Source: Weather.Directory

== Notable people ==
Greystones and its environs (including Delgany) are home to several notable people including:

- Amy Bowtell, professional tennis player
- Éamon de Buitléar, wildlife film-maker and naturalist
- Reggie Corrigan, former Ireland national rugby union team team member and Leinster player
- Paul Dunne, golfer
- Seán Drea, former Irish Olympic rower and World Championships & Henley Royal Regatta record holder
- Ronnie Drew of The Dubliners lived in Greystones
- Geraldine Fitzgerald, actress
- Sean FitzPatrick, former chairman of Anglo Irish Bank
- David and Stephen Flynn, chefs
- George Hamilton, commentator for RTÉ television
- Simon Harris, current Tánaiste
- Adam Harris, brother of Simon Harris and founder of AsIAm
- Ciara Kelly, broadcaster
- Paul McNaughton, former Irish international rugby player, ex Leinster manager
- Samuel Middleton, cricketer
- John L. Murray, Chief Justice of Ireland 2004–2011
- A. J. Potter, composer
- Damien Rice, musician
- Marten Toonder, artist, creator of Oliver B. Bumble

== Town twinning ==
Greystones has town twinning agreements with:

- Holyhead, Wales, United Kingdom.

== Gallery ==
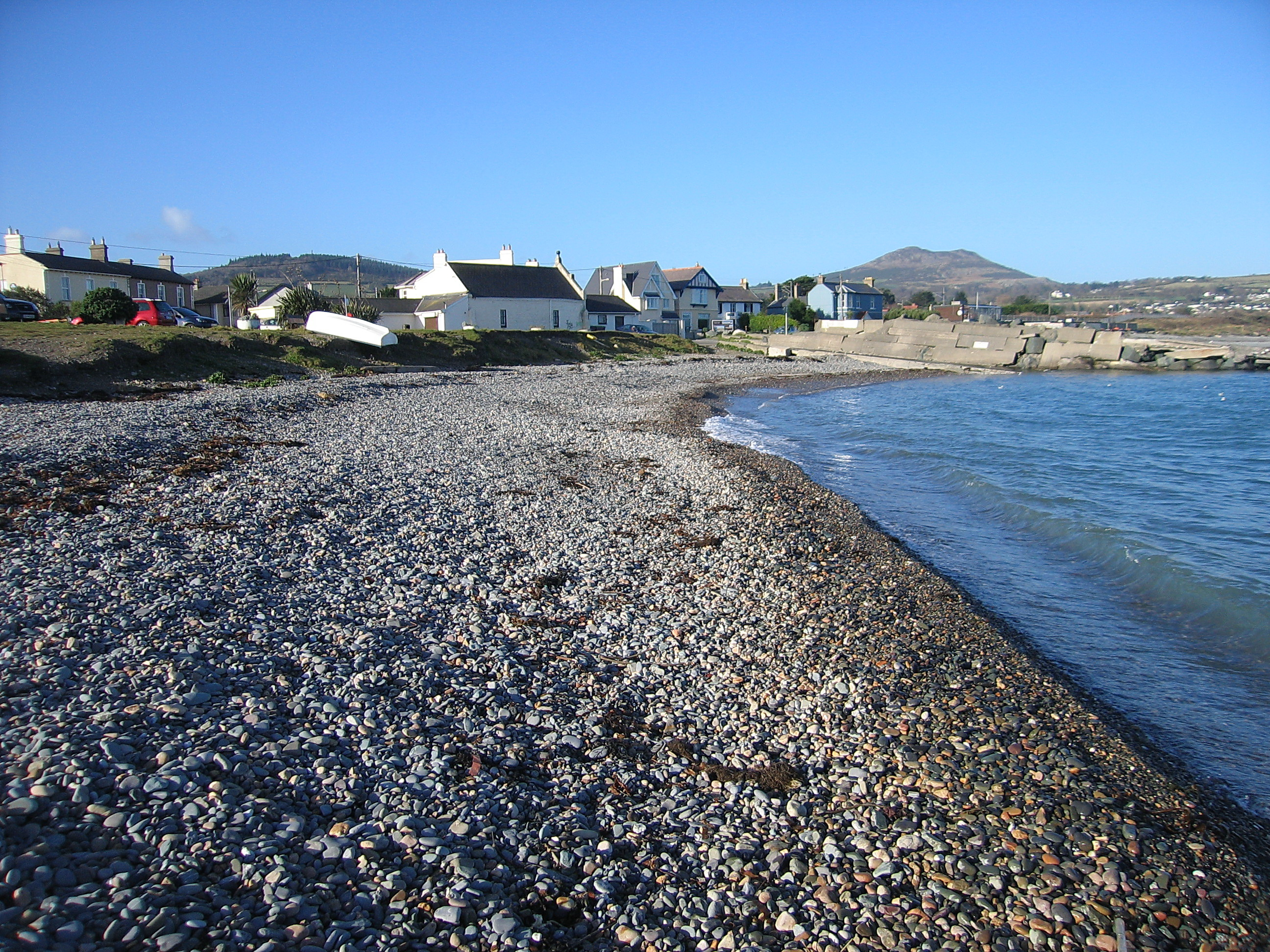
Harbour and Little Sugar Loaf

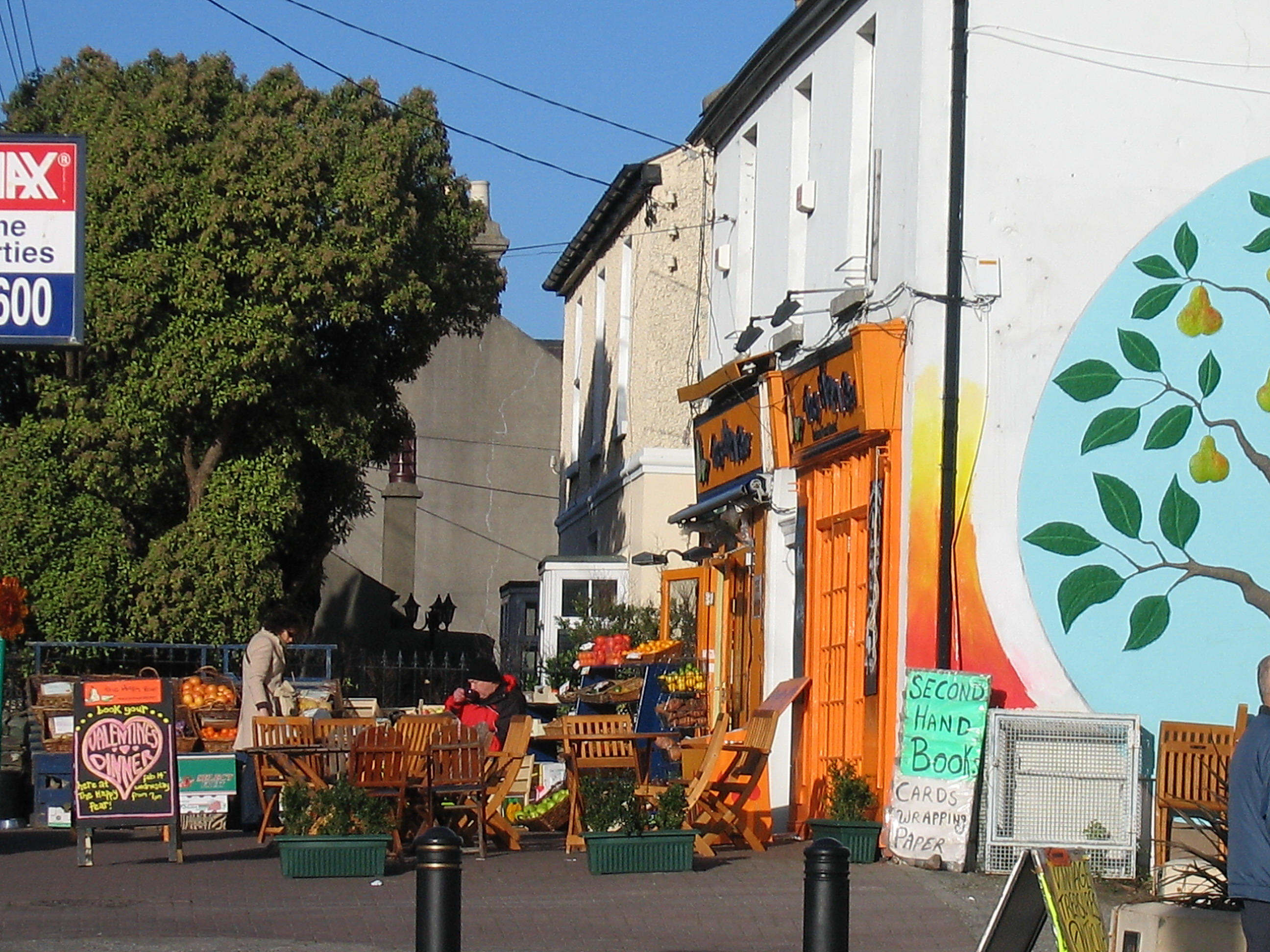
Shops in Greystones

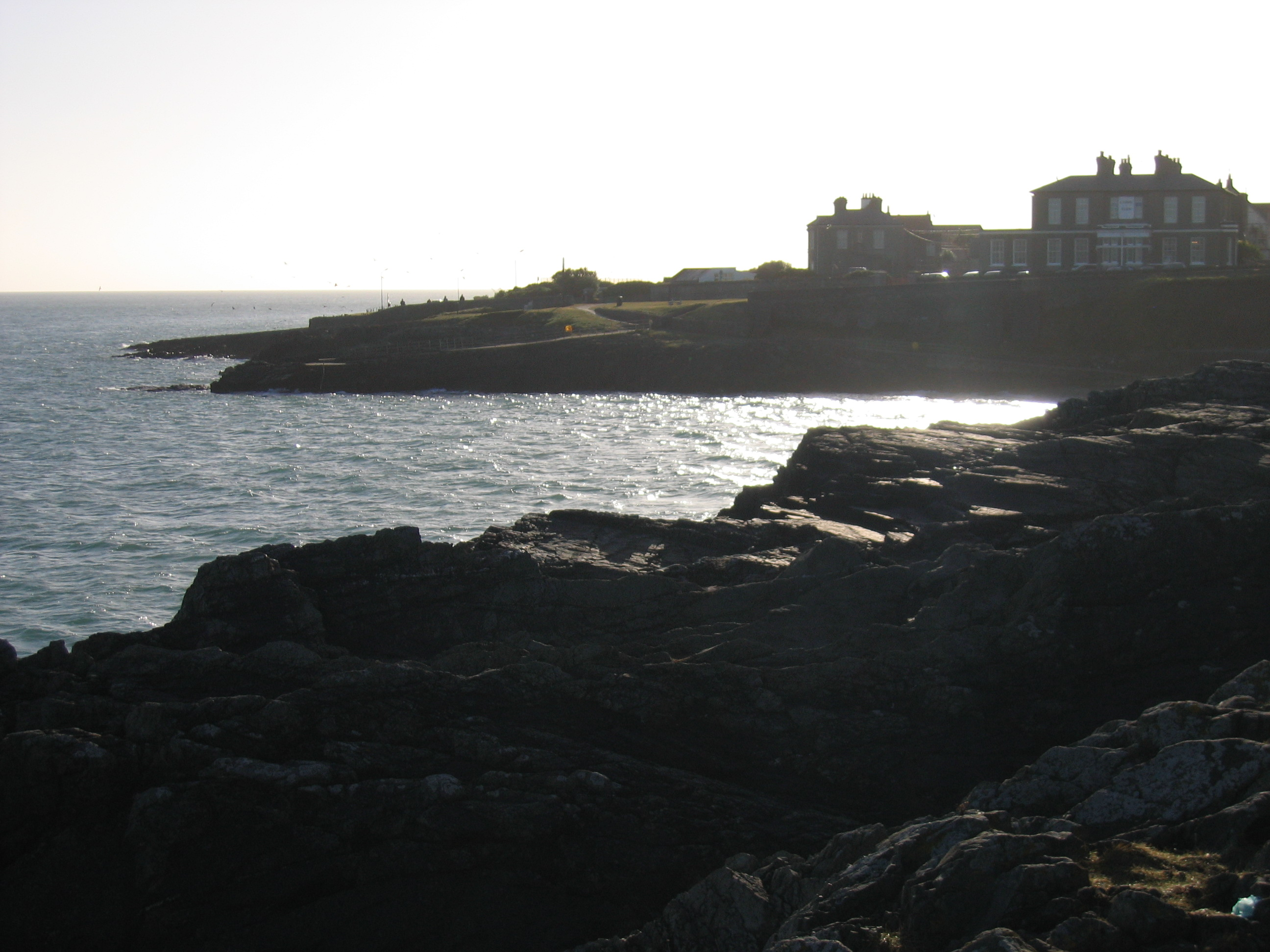
Seafront

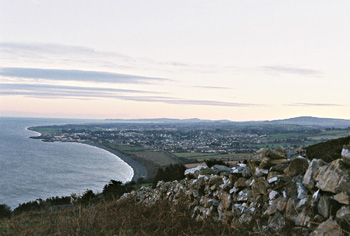
Greystones from north

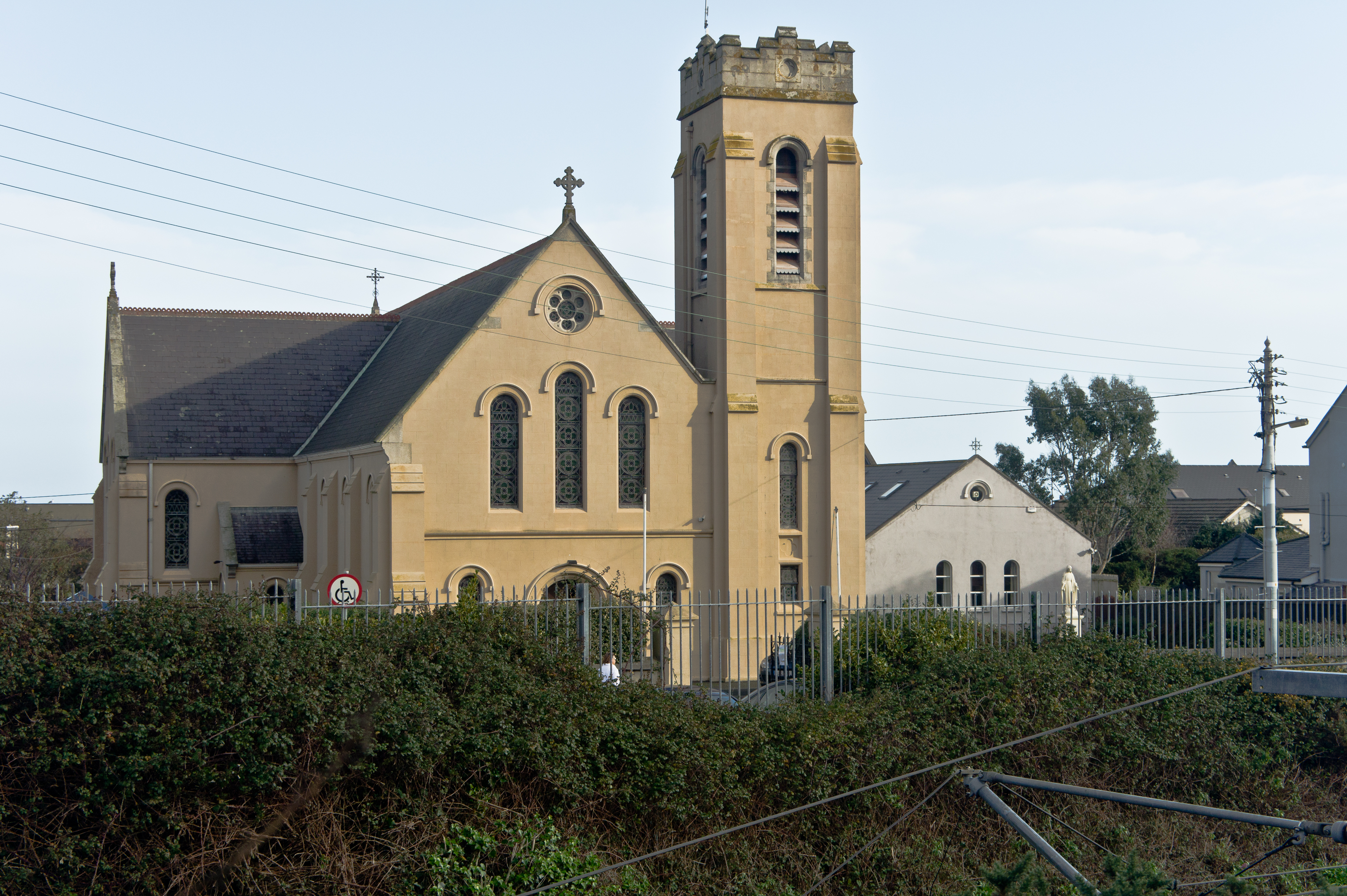
Holy Rosary Church

== See also ==
- List of towns and villages in Ireland
