= Charlesland =

Suburb of Greystones, County Wicklow, Ireland

Coordinates: 53°07′25″N 6°04′05″W

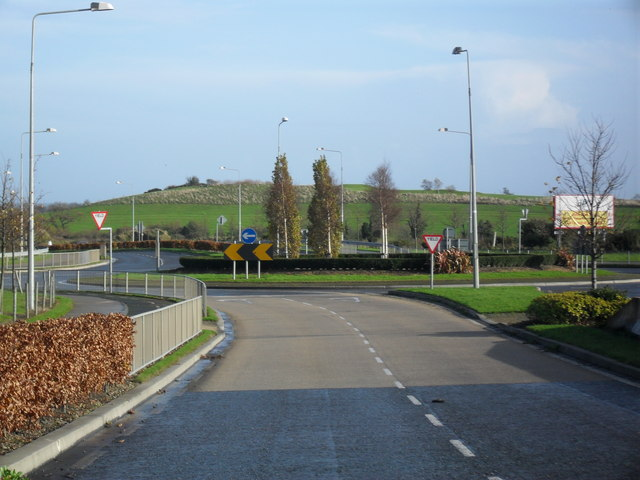
Roundabout at Charlesland

Charlesland (Irish: Acra na mBodach, meaning 'acre of the low-bred persons (or churls)') is a townland and residential development located on the southside of Greystones in County Wicklow, Ireland. It is about 25 kilometres from Dublin city centre. As of the 2011 census, the townland of Charlesland had a population of 3,130 people.

In addition to residential properties, the Charlesland area of Greystones has a shopping centre and a sports and recreation complex. The sports facility, Shoreline Sports Park, has tennis, padel and basketball courts, several outdoor 5-a-side pitches, and a skatepark. The area is served by the L2, X1 and X2 bus routes.
