= Samuel Middleton (cricketer) =

Irish cricketer (1901–1949)

Personal information
- Full name: Samuel Henry Windrush Middleton
- Born: 27 September 1901; Greystones, Ireland
- Died: 6 January 1949 (aged 47); Dublin, Leinster, Ireland
- Batting: Right-handed
- Bowling: Right-arm off break

Domestic team information
- Years: Team
- 1922: Dublin University

Career statistics
Competition	First-class
Matches	1
Runs scored	0
Batting average	0.00
100s/50s	–/–
Top score	0*
Balls bowled	24
Wickets	0
Bowling average	–
5 wickets in innings	–
10 wickets in match	–
Best bowling	–
Catches/stumpings	–/–
- Source: Cricinfo, 21 October 2018

Samuel Henry Windrush Middleton (27 September 1901 – 6 January 1949) was an Irish first-class cricketer.

Middleton was born at Greystones in County Wicklow in September 1901, and was educated at St. Andrew's College, Dublin. He later studied at Trinity College Dublin. While studying at the university, he made one appearance in first-class cricket for Dublin University against Essex at Brentwood during their 1922 tour of England. He failed to score any runs or take any wickets during the match. He was capped once for Ireland in a non first-class match in 1921 against the Military at Dublin. The match was abandoned after two gunmen opened fire on the players, killing a spectator. He died at Dublin in January 1949.
