= Samuel Middleton Semmes =

American politician

Samuel Middleton Semmes (9 March 1811 – 14 November 1867) was an American attorney and Maryland State Senator.

Semmes was born in Charles County, Maryland, United States, in 1811. He had one brother, Raphael, who went on to become an Admiral in the Confederate States Navy. Samuel graduated from Georgetown University, and was admitted to the bar in Allegany County.

He drafted most of the charters of the pioneering coal companies in Allegany County. He served as a judge of the Maryland Court of Appeals from 1844 to 1845, and as state senator from 1855 to 1866. He was associated with Lulworth Iron, and the New York Mining Company. He passed in Allegany, Maryland, in 1867.
