= Artemis Fowl (disambiguation) =

Artemis Fowl is a series of novels by Eoin Colfer.

Artemis Fowl may also refer to:

- Artemis Fowl (novel), the first book in the series
- Artemis Fowl II, main character of the series
- Artemis Fowl I, father of Artemis Fowl II
- Artemis Fowl (film), a sci-fi film adaptation of the first book
- Artemis Fowl: The Graphic Novel, a graphic novel adaptation of the first book

== See also ==
- The Fowl Twins (novel)
