= The Fowl Twins Get What They Deserve =

Book by Eoin Colfer

- Author: Eoin Colfer
- Publisher: Disney-Hyperion
- Publication date: October 19, 2021
- Pages: 340 pages
- ISBN: 9781368075671 Hardcover

The Fowl Twins Get What They Deserve is the third and final book of The Fowl Twins series written by Eoin Colfer, the second cycle of The Fowl Adventures. It was released on October 19, 2021, and is preceded by The Fowl Twins Deny All Charges.

== Plot ==
Myles and Beckett find themselves at a pathologists' conference in London when Lord Teddy Bleedham-Drye, in his unending quest to kill the twins, attacks Myles with his weaponized jet. In the ensuing scuffle, Teddy is killed, but Myles isn't convinced. Myles, Beckett & Lazuli then visit a mortuary, meet ghosts and encounter clones. It all ends in an epic showdown in the Scilly Isles between the Regrettables (Myles, Beckett, Whistle Blower & Lazuli) and Teddy.

== Main characters ==
- Myles Fowl: An intelligent boy who has almost no physical ability but is good at coming up with plans. He finds out that he has the ability to turn into a dwarf as effect of when he was possessed in Artemis Fowl and the Last Guardian. Twin to Beckett Fowl.
- Beckett Fowl: An energetic, transpecies polyglot and one of the few people in the world to have mastered the cluster punch. Myles’ twin.
- Lazuli Heitz: A pixie-elf-hybrid (also known as a pixel) that grew up in an orphanage and wants to know who her mother is. Serves as Fowl Ambassador and usually breaks many fairy rules while on Fowl adventures.
- Lord Teddy Bleedham-Drye: The Duke of Scilly. Commonly referred to as just “Teddy”, before he meets the Fowl Twins he is obsessed with two things; becoming immortal or living as long as possible and finding the Lionheart ring so that he could become king. When he meets the twins he finds another obsession, killing them.

== Background ==
The Fowl Twins Get What They Deserve was ordered by Disney-Hyperion in March 2021.

== Reception ==
Kirkus Reviews wrote, "Like its bestselling progenitors, a nonstop spinoff afroth with high-tech, spectacular magic, and silly business."

The Children's Book Review wrote that the book "is funny, exciting, and original".

while Laughing Place praised how "Colfer ha[d] done the impossible by revisiting a familiar world, but somehow made the world anew for readers", while "wind[ing] the story tight [and] enabl[ing] characters to grow in their maturity [and] brotherly moments [to] ground this fantastical story."

== Future ==
During the book tour for The Fowl Twins Get What They Deserve on November 11, 2021, Eoin Colfer confirmed that while the novel was intended to be the final The Fowl Twins novel, that he intended to write a new novel in the future in a "black-and-white [morally], superviolent" third cycle of The Fowl Adventures; following "the grown-up version of Artemis [as] a magnate [who has] gone over to the dark side a bit too far" following his return from space, featuring the multiverse (i.e. the alternate timeline from The Time Paradox, lacking an Opal Koboi as of the events of The Last Guardian), and exploring the romantic relationship between Artemis Fowl II and Holly Short teased in previous novels, Colfer compared the proposed novel to Mark Millar's Old Man Logan and his own 2020 novel Highfire.
