= The Fowl Twins Deny All Charges =

Book by Eoin Colfer

- Irish and UK cover
- Author: Eoin Colfer
- Cover artist: Goni Montez
- Language: English
- Series: The Fowl Twins
- Genre: Fantasy
- Publisher: Viking Press/Disney Hyperion
- Publication date: 20 October 2020
- Publication place: Ireland
- Media type: Print
- Pages: 336
- ISBN: 978-1-368045-04-9
- OCLC: 1200750168
- Preceded by: The Fowl Twins
- Followed by: Get What They Deserve

The Fowl Twins Deny All Charges is the second novel in Eoin Colfer's The Fowl Twins series, a spin-off and continuation of the Artemis Fowl series and second cycle of The Fowl Adventures, following Myles and Beckett Fowl, the younger twin brothers of criminal mastermind Artemis Fowl II, as they live out their house arrest under the supervision of pixie-elf hybrid Lazuli Heitz. Deny All Charges was released 20 October 2020 by Viking Press and Disney Hyperion. The novel was well received by critics, with reviews comparing its quality and success to that of the original series.

== Background ==
Colfer stated writing Artemis Fowl and the Last Guardian that he had had "enough" with the series, opting to take a "breather" from it in favor of other projects, stating with regards the writing of The Fowl Twins that "[i]t would probably be a lot easier if I was on Artemis 15 by now. I just find I get bored, and if I get bored, the work suffers", having decided to return to the Fowl series after having "had too many stories running around in [his] head to ignore", referencing that while it is "not very Irish to be proud of something, but I started to feel a pride in the [Fowl] world. I'm kind of a curmudgeon, really, but I went back into it more positively." Colfer received an initial order of two books for The Fowl Twins spin-off series from Disney Hyperion, writing both The Fowl Twins and Deny All Charges simultaneously.

== Reception ==
Critical reception for The Fowl Twins Deny All Charges was positive, meeting with praise from most reviewers. Kirkus Reviews praised the book, writing: "Colfer [continuously] strings dazzling displays of high tech, heartwarming peeks at the family dynamics of the closely knit if decidedly eccentric Fowl clan, dolphin-back rides, huge blobs of slime (some of it explosive), and a climactic exhibition of prejudice gone off the rails that is intense enough to leave readers queasy." The Irish Times praised the novel as an "offer [of a] page-turning adventure with a side of ridiculous fun", numbering it among the "best children’s books of the year". while Laughing Place praised how "Colfer has proven that you can capture lightning in a bottle twice with this supremely hilarious and joyful read", and of his "gift with language and for creating such likable characters that makes this reader chuckle from page to page." Better Reading complimented the novel's "multi-faceted" characters and for "action sequences [that] are jam-packed [with a] dialled-up [form of] craziness [at] maximum levels in a kind of literary challenge."
