= Artemis Fowl and the Last Guardian =

Novel by Eoin Colfer

- UK cover
- Author: Eoin Colfer
- Language: English
- Series: Artemis Fowl
- Genre: Fantasy
- Publisher: Viking Press/Disney Hyperion
- Publication date: 10 July 2012
- Media type: Print
- Pages: 336
- ISBN: 1-4231-6161-0
- Preceded by: The Atlantis Complex (2010)
- Followed by: The Fowl Twins (2019)

Artemis Fowl and the Last Guardian, known in America as Artemis Fowl: The Last Guardian is the eighth novel in Eoin Colfer's Artemis Fowl series. Colfer had previously alluded to the novel being the final entry when he stated that the previous book, The Atlantis Complex, was the penultimate in the series. The Last Guardian was released 10 July 2012 by Viking Press and Disney Hyperion. The novel received generally positive reviews, winning the award for the 2012 Senior Irish Children's Book of the Year.

In 2019, it was followed by the spin-off novel The Fowl Twins.

== Plot ==
Just as Artemis leaves his final session of therapy for Atlantis Complex, he and Butler are summoned by Holly to the office of Commander Trouble Kelp, where they witness the next plan of Opal Koboi; she has two of her underlings kill her past self, who had survived the Kraken blast in The Time Paradox. Her past self's death creates a paradox, causing Opal's creations from the past five years to violently explode. To prevent the destruction of Atlantis, where Opal's prison is located, the Fairies place Opal in the containment chamber of a nuclear reactor. The blast destroys most Fairy technology, which Koboi labs had controlled or created, and human technology, since black market Koboi chips had been used in their development and construction.

As explosions throughout the world blow out most vehicles, buildings, satellites, and cell phones, killing many people in the process, human communication systems shut down, and the human world falls into chaos. During her stay in the nuclear reactor, Opal furthers her ability to use black magic and opens The Berserker's Gate, a portal located on the Fowl estate, behind which dwell the spirits of fairy soldiers killed in the Battle of Taillte, an ancient war fought nearly ten thousand years previously. The spirits rise and possess Beckett and Myles, Artemis's twin brothers, Juliet, corpses, and woodland critters. Queen Bellico is the spirit possessing Juliet.

When Artemis, Holly, and Butler arrive on the estate after a last-minute escape from Haven, they immediately try to foil Opal's plan, but they end up in hiding with Mulch Diggums, who was trying to rob Fowl Manor. After several more battles, Bellico permanently cripples Butler's heart with a bolt of Opal's black magic, and Mulch rides a rampaging troll to assist Artemis' plan to prevent Opal from opening the second gate with a laser cannon from a solar plane Artemis developed in a shed. Artemis and Holly release some of the spirits to heaven before Opal opens the second lock.

Using Opal's dying clone, Nopal, which Opal had created in The Opal Deception, Artemis closes the second lock on the Berserker's Gate, since only Opal's genetic fingerprint can close the second lock forever. The possessed humans are released, but not before the group's leader, Oro Shaydova, uses Beckett's body to kill Opal once and for all. The closing of the second lock destroys all fairies within the boundaries, killing Artemis due to the fairy eye he received from Holly in The Lost Colony.

Six months later, in a recovered human world, Foaly clones Artemis using DNA from Artemis' saliva from when he kissed Holly's forehead just before he began the final plan to stop Opal. Artemis's soul, which clung on through sheer willpower and intellect at the Fowl Estate, then inhabits the mindless clone. As a result of Artemis' resurrection, he has suffered heavy temporary memory loss. Holly begins to tell the clone the story of how she met the original Artemis, starting the opening line of the first book in the series: "It all started in Ho Chi Minh City one summer. It was sweltering by anyone's standards. Needless to say, Artemis Fowl would not have been willing to put up with such discomfort if something extremely important had not been at stake. Important to the plan..."

== Background ==
Colfer stated that he wanted the novel to deal with Artemis' transformation "from being a selfish criminal to a hero who is prepared to sacrifice everything for a good cause." Colfer had intended the series to be a trilogy but wrote more novels since the series spawned more ideas. He then "decided that I could only write a book about Artemis if the story was strong enough, so I planned one at a time. After eight, I concluded it was time to move on."

== Reception ==
Critical reception for The Last Guardian was positive, meeting with praise from most reviewers. Kirkus Reviews praised the book, writing: "Colfer pits his resourceful crew against an army of killer bunnies and decomposed corpses (most of the estate's other residents being off for Christmas). All this is on the way to a smashing set of climactic twists and turns, just deserts and life-changing sacrifices." Entertainment Weekly gave the book a grade of "A−" and wrote that "pseudo science, overly complex schemes, and the requisite dwarf flatulence jokes abound, but the heart of the series remains with Artemis and his evolution from spoiled but brilliant teenager to thoughtful, self-sacrificing, still brilliant young adult." The Irish Times commented on the series' international popularity, attributing it to the series' "quick-moving and highly charged narratives" and "mischievous sense of humour," and states the final volume was "particularly successful in delineating young Artemis’s move away from self-regard". Sharon O'Niell of Irish Independent praised the book as "a unique creation, blending fairytales and folklore with hi-tech gadgetry" and further wrote: "[book is] one of the best in the series and will not disappoint young fans. The ending is appropriately climactic – and to give anything away would be far more criminal than anything Artemis has got up to in the past." Another positive review came from Philippine Daily Inquirer's Ruel De Vera, who wrote: "Eoin Colfer's 'Artemis Fowl and the Last Guardian' is a most fitting final caper for the ever-planning young genius who brought the readers along with him as he went for mere smart bad person into something much, much more." The Last Guardian won the 2012 Irish Book Award in the "Irish Children's Book - Senior" category.
