= Lara McDonnell =

Irish actress (born 2003)

- Born: 7 November 2003 (age 22); Castleknock, Dublin, Ireland
- Education: St Brigid's National School, Castleknock; The King's Hospital School
- Occupation: Actress
- Years active: 2013–present

Lara McDonnell (born 7 November 2003) is an Irish actress. She starred as the alternating title role in the West End production of Matilda the Musical from 2015 to 2016. She has since landed roles in a number of films. McDonnell appeared on the 2021 Irish Independent list of actors to go stellar.

== Early life and education ==
McDonnell is from the Luttrellstown area of Castleknock, a suburb west of Dublin. The eldest of three to parents Hazel and Ciaran, she has a sister (Charlotte) and a brother (Andrew). McDonnell attended St Brigid's National School, Castleknock. She took after school drama classes at a parish centre near her school.

== Career ==
McDonnell made her first acting appearance in 2014, playing an adolescent Rosie in the romantic comedy-drama film Love, Rosie. The following year, she was cast as one of four girls playing Matilda Wormwood in the West End musical Matilda the Musical. After this, McDonnell played a young Anne Brontë in To Walk Invisible (2016) and then as Alannah in The Delinquent Season (2018).

She then played Captain Holly Short in Kenneth Branagh's Artemis Fowl (2020), a Disney film based on the novel of the same name by Eoin Colfer. Following the release of the trailer, McDonnell's casting drew some criticism as Holly is described in the book as having "nut-brown skin", leading to accusations of whitewashing. McDonnell would work with Branagh again on his film Belfast (2021), playing Moira.

In 2022, she appeared in the Channel 5 drama The Holiday as Lucy. The same year, she also appeared in the Netflix series The Last Bus. In 2023, she starred in Greatest Days, playing a teenage Rachel.

Since January 2024, McDonnell has played the part of Young Joan in the play The Hills of California.

== Acting credits ==
=== Film ===
Year	Title	Role	Notes	Ref.
2014	Love, Rosie	10-year-old Rosie Dunne	Debut role	
2016	To Walk Invisible	Young Anne	Television film	
2018	The Delinquent Season	Alannah		
2020	Artemis Fowl	Holly Short		
2021	Belfast	Moira		
2023	Greatest Days	Young Rachel		

=== Television ===
Year	Title	Role	Notes	Ref.
2022	The Holiday	Lucy		
2022	The Last Bus	Lucy Monkhouse	Episode 10	

=== Stage ===
Year	Title	Role	Venue	Notes	Ref.
2015–2016	Matilda the Musical	Matilda Wormwood	Cambridge Theatre; London, England	Produced by the Royal Shakespeare Company. In December 2016, McDonnell was flown back to London to provide emergency cover as Matilda.	
2024	The Hills of California	Young Joan	Harold Pinter Theatre; London, England and Broadhurst Theatre; New York	McDonnell was in the London cast, and in Autumn 2024, transferred to Broadway, alongside other cast members.	
