= Michael Moreci =

American comics author and novelist

- Born: Chicago
- Occupations: Comics Author, Novelist
- Children: 2
- Writing career
- Genres: Comic fantasy, Science-fiction
- Website: michaelpmoreci.com

Michael Moreci is an American comic author and novelist writing in the science fiction and horror genres. His original works include critically acclaimed military horror comic series Burning Fields and space comic series Roche Limit, which was included in Paste's "Required Reading: 50 of the Best Sci-Fi Comics". Moreci has written two Star Wars-inspired space opera novels - Black Star Renegades and We Are Mayhem.

Moreci has written canonical material for a number of franchises including Star Wars, Stranger Things and the DC Universe. In 2019, he wrote a graphic novel adaptation of Eoin Colfer's Artemis Fowl in promotion of Disney's 2020 film adaptation.

== Personal life ==
Morechi was born and grew up in Chicago. He cites Kurt Vonnegut, Ray Bradbury and J. R. R. Tolkien as key influences.

== Works ==
=== Novels ===
- The Throwaway (2018)
- Black Star Renegades (2019)
- We Are Mayhem (2020)

=== Comic books ===
- Curse (2014)
- Roche Limit (2015)
- Burning Fields (2016)
- Artemis Fowl (2019)
- The Plot (2020)
- Archangel 8 (2020)
- various Stranger Things comics (2020-present)
- John Carpenter's Toxic Commando: Rise of the Sludge God (2024)
