= Artemis Fowl and the Eternity Code =

Third book in the Artemis Fowl series by Eoin Colfer

- First edition cover
- Author: Eoin Colfer
- Language: English
- Series: Artemis Fowl series
- Genre: Fantasy novel
- Published: 27 April 2003 Viking Press
- Publication place: Ireland
- Media type: Print (hardback & paperback), Audiobook CD
- Pages: 352 (first edition, hardback)
- ISBN: 0-670-91352-9 (first edition, hardback) 0141321318 (third edition, paperback)
- OCLC: 249117789
- Preceded by: The Arctic Incident (2002)
- Followed by: The Opal Deception (2005)

Artemis Fowl and the Eternity Code (known in America as Artemis Fowl: The Eternity Code) is the third book of Irish children's fiction author Eoin Colfer's Artemis Fowl series. It is preceded by Artemis Fowl and the Arctic Incident and followed by Artemis Fowl and the Opal Deception. The storyline follows Artemis Fowl and his companions as they struggle to recover the "C Cube", a supercomputer Artemis had constructed from fairy technology, when Jon Spiro manages to steal it. Critical response was generally favourable.

== Plot ==
Artemis Fowl II, the 13-year-old criminal mastermind, has created a supercomputer which he calls the "C Cube", from the stolen fairy LEPrecon helmets confiscated by Butler in the siege of Fowl Manor. It far surpasses any human technology made so far. Fowl meets Chicago businessman Jon Spiro in London to show him the Cube, in an attempt to buy a considerable amount of gold in exchange for keeping the technology off the market. However, Spiro ambushes and outwits Artemis and steals the Cube. In the process, Butler, Artemis' bodyguard, is shot by one of Spiro's staff, Arno Blunt.

Artemis' demonstration of the Cube inadvertently detects Fairy technology below ground, causing a shutdown of all equipment in Haven city. In response, Commander Root sends Captain Holly Short to London to find what the disturbance was caused by. She locates Artemis, who persuades her to revive Butler with fairy magic and the aid of cryogenics. The procedure saves Butler's life, but ages him approximately 15 years. Artemis reveals the Cube's existence to Holly and the LEPrecon's technical expert Foaly the centaur.

Jon Spiro, meanwhile, has commissioned a mob family from Chicago to capture Artemis to break the Cube's Eternity Code which prevents Spiro from accessing its software. One of its employees is the dwarf Mulch Diggums, who is sent along with the thug Loafers to Fowl Manor to do the job. Although Mulch is rumbled, Loafers is incapacitated by Juliet, Butler's little sister, who has just returned from a failed final test at Madame Ko's Academy, where Butler trained to be a bodyguard. After a discussion with Root, who gives them 48 hours before he sends in a full Retrieval team, Artemis comes up with an elaborate plan to retrieve the Cube from Spiro's office in Chicago, involving the use of Holly, Mulch and Juliet. Root demands a mind-wipe of the three humans after the job is done, so Artemis leaves Butler in Ireland to ensure their memories survive.

The heist is ultimately successful, with Artemis retrieving the Cube after tricking Spiro into entering a rival company's headquarters to steal their new products. The Chicago police immediately arrive to arrest Spiro and his associates, and Foaly wipes Artemis' movements from the CCTV. Holly and Juliet remove Artemis from the crime, and return with Mulch to Ireland. Although Arno Blunt escapes and tries to enter Ireland to kill Artemis, Butler has him detained and frightens him into confessing his crimes. Root then has the three humans mind-wiped, after Holly mesmerizes Artemis to see if there were any traces left to trigger his memories. Unbeknownst to all, Artemis has had Butler commission three sets of contact lenses to stop the process. Artemis' plan to retrieve his memories involves Mulch Diggums: Artemis has the date of the search warrant of Mulch's cave changed to the day after his first arrest, rendering all subsequent convictions null and void. Artemis then hands Mulch a gold medallion before his mind-wipe, which is actually a computer disc containing all of Artemis' memories. Although Mulch is incarcerated, he takes comfort in the knowledge that "together they will be unstoppable."

== Secret message ==
In European editions, the code on the cover reads "Think fairy, think again" the slogan for the original Artemis Fowl. The code is not written in Gnommish or Centaurian, instead supposedly written in the "eternity code" with which the C Cube is encrypted.

In the hardcover edition, the code for Eoin Colfer Artemis Fowl The Eternity Code Puffin is printed on the spine underneath the dustjacket, allowing the reader to decipher the code inside the book, which is a message from Artemis asking the reader to help him regain his memories by spreading the message that Artemis Fowl must find Mulch Diggums

In the reprint of the book, the Eternity Code is changed to Gnommish.

== Critical reception ==
Critical response was generally positive. Publishers Weekly, complimented the book on its "Agile prose, rapid-fire dialogue and wise-acre humour." Entertainment Weekly rated the book A−, saying that "The kid's still got it...Harry better watch his back", and that the characters were "still silly and saucy". Disney Family Entertainment rated it three stars out of five and remarked that it was not "great literature", but it was well written and would be an entertaining summer reading book.
