= St Brigid's National School, Castleknock =

St. Brigid's National School
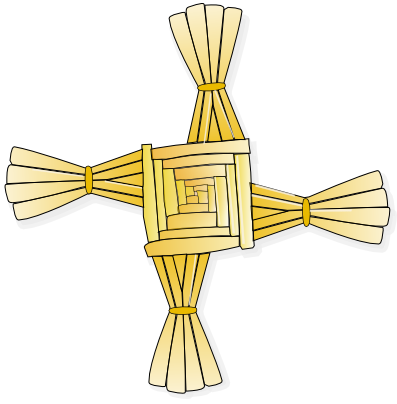

Location
- Castleknock, Fingal; Republic of Ireland
- Coordinates: 53.3749°N 6.3620°W

Information
- Religious affiliation: Roman Catholic
- Established: Prior to 17 July 1864
- Enrollment: ≈ 1000
- Website: SaintBrigids.ie

St. Brigid's National School is a primary national school for boys and girls. It is located off Beechpark Avenue in Castleknock, Fingal, Ireland. It has a Roman Catholic ethos.

St. Brigids' choir has performed at several competitions, including the ESB Feis Ceoil in Dublin in which they placed first.

== Notable former pupils ==
- Lara McDonnell- actress
- Colin Farrell – actor
- Sarah Hawkshaw – Ireland women's field hockey international
