= Artemis Fowl and the Opal Deception =

Book by Eoin Colfer

- First edition cover
- Author: Eoin Colfer
- Language: English
- Series: Artemis Fowl series
- Publisher: Puffin Books
- Publication date: 30 April 2005
- Publication place: Ireland
- Media type: Print (hardback and paperback), Audiobook CD
- Pages: 352 (first edition, hardback)
- ISBN: 0-14-138164-7 (first edition, hardback)
- OCLC: 60343030
- Preceded by: The Eternity Code (2003)
- Followed by: The Lost Colony (2006)

Artemis Fowl and the Opal Deception, known in America as Artemis Fowl: The Opal Deception, is a teen fantasy novel published in 2005, the 4th book in the Artemis Fowl series by the Irish author Eoin Colfer. Preceded by Artemis Fowl and the Eternity Code and followed by Artemis Fowl and the Lost Colony, it is centred on the brilliant pixie Opal Koboi's second try at rebellion (after her first attempt was a failure) and Artemis Fowl II and his fairy comrades' efforts to stop her. Critical reception was mixed, with some reviews praising the book and others deeming its writing poor and confusing.

== Plot ==
The pixie Opal Koboi is believed to be in a coma inside an asylum, but is actually faking it to avoid incarceration by the Lower Elements Police after her failed rebellion and attempt of world domination in Artemis Fowl and the Arctic Incident. To ensure she is secure in her cell, the LEP has her under 24-hour surveillance, has DNA tests done every 4 hours, plants a tracker and tranquilizer known as a seeker-sleeper in her arm, and keeps her in a net trapped with monitoring pads. Koboi manages to escape regardless with help from the pixie Brill Brothers, filling the cell and fooling the security with a brain dead clone otherwise identical to herself.

Koboi lures Commander Julius Root and Captain Holly Short of the LEP into a lava chute alone. She then kills Commander Root with an explosive attached to his body. The explosive is invisible on camera and she tricks Holly into shooting it in an attempt to defuse it, framing Holly as the murderer. She then launches a bio-bomb at Artemis Fowl, which he narrowly escapes thanks to the quick work of his bodyguard Domovoi Butler.

Artemis Fowl, teenage criminal mastermind, has no memory of fairy society due to being mindwiped in the previous book in the series, Artemis Fowl and the Eternity Code. This has caused his personality and conscience to revert to that of an amoral villain, and with the help of Butler he conducts a clever heist to steal the famed painting The Fairy Thief directly before being attacked.

Holly, now a fugitive, rescues Artemis from the scene of the bio-bomb attack. She tells him who she is, but he does not regain his memories as she had hoped. After he agrees to help her for a fee, the two are recaptured by Koboi and thrown into an abandoned, troll-infested fairy theme park known as the "Eleven Wonders of the Human World" (containing scale-models not only of the Seven Wonders of the Ancient World but also the additions of Abu Simbel, Borobodur, Rapa Nui and the Throne Hall at Persepolis). After a desperate battle against the troll hordes on a model of the Temple of Artemis at Ephesus, they are rescued by former criminal Mulch Diggums and Butler. Holly and Artemis become friends "bonded by trauma", and Artemis rescinds his requirement of a fee.

After being rescued, Mulch gives Artemis a disk of his memories that Artemis had previously prepared and disguised as a gold medallion. Artemis is overcome with guilt for what he had done to the fairies, and for the first time apologizes to Holly for kidnapping her. Now markedly more emotional and friendly with Holly, Butler, and Mulch, Artemis prepares to take on Koboi. The four are the only ones who know she is free, and the LEP are on their tail in pursuit of Holly.

Koboi plans to expose fairy society to humanity, ideally causing an interspecies war and fairy genocide. She uses the fairy mesmer to convince Italian billionaire environmentalist Giovanni Zito that she is his pampered adopted daughter Belinda, as well as to convince him to send a probe downwards in millions of tons of molten iron. The group outpaces the probe with a fairy craft ill-fitted for intense life or death scenarios, and manage to divert its path. Koboi crashes into a woman's vine field. She attempts the Belinda trick again, but runs out of magic exactly before she is able to mesmerize the woman into pampering her, trapping her in a life of manual labor which she abhors.

A week later Koboi is detained by the LEP, and Holly is cleared of all charges over Commander Root's murder. However, disillusioned, she resigns and starts a private investigation firm with Mulch Diggums. Artemis anonymously donates The Fairy Thief to the Louvre.

== The Tongue ==
There is a secret code at the bottom of the book, containing a message from Foaly. This is translatable if one has the Gnommish alphabet, available in The Artemis Fowl Files by Eoin Colfer, or the Artemis Fowl website.

The message on the cover of the US publication, barely decipherable, reads "Opal wants revenge", it is faintly repeated several times on the sides of the tube.

The Gnommish symbols around the molecules on the front cover read "DNA never lies".

== Critical reception ==
The book received generally mixed reviews. Entertainment Weekly noted that the characters were "still a blast", however, the review also said "Colfer seems too dazzled by all the gadgetry and explosives jammed into this tale." Disney's Family.com called the book "pretty confusing", though said it still retained the strengths of the series as a whole. The School Library Journal wrote that "the prose is clunky", however, it continued to say that the "creativity carry the narrative through the tight spots and impossible situations."
