= Artemis Fowl and the Atlantis Complex =

Novel by Eoin Colfer

- First edition cover.
- Author: Eoin Colfer
- Language: English
- Series: Artemis Fowl series
- Genre: Fantasy
- Publisher: Disney Hyperion; Miramax Books
- Publication date: 20 July 2010
- Publication place: Ireland
- Media type: Print (hardback & paperback), Audiobook CD
- Pages: 357 (Hardcover)
- ISBN: 978-1-4231-2819-9
- OCLC: 635637067
- Preceded by: The Time Paradox (2008)
- Followed by: The Last Guardian (2012)

Artemis Fowl and the Atlantis Complex, known in America as Artemis Fowl: The Atlantis Complex, is the seventh book in the Artemis Fowl series. It was published on 20 July 2010 in the United Kingdom and on 3 August 2010 in North America. It was followed by Artemis Fowl and the Last Guardian, which was confirmed to be the final book in the Artemis Fowl series.

== Plot ==
On Vatnajökull, a glacier in Iceland, Artemis unveils the Ice Cube, his invention to stop global warming (by shooting reflective nano wafers into the clouds, and having them rain down with the snow, and when they land, they reflect the sun's light and insulate the icebergs), to Captain Holly Short, Foaly, and Wing Commander Vinyáya. Artemis' speech is slowed as he counts his words, and Holly and Foaly conclude that he has Atlantis Complex, a psychological fairy disease with symptoms including OCD, paranoia, and dissociative identity disorder. While outside, showing off the invention, Artemis's scans pick up a UFO. Foaly confirms the scans, and Artemis suddenly mentally snaps, accusing Foaly of trying to steal his invention. Holly tries mesmerizing him, but they are attacked by a mysterious spacecraft that Foaly designed to search for life on Mars. The craft crash lands, hits a shuttle, and instantly kills Commander Vinyáya and all LEP backup, leaving Holly, Foaly and Artemis stranded on the glacier without communications or weapons.

Artemis's bodyguard, Butler, is in Mexico. A paranoid Artemis tricked him into travelling to Cancún by telling him his sister, Juliet, now a wrestler nicknamed "Jade Princess", was in danger. Juliet and Butler escape a horde of zombie-like wrestling fans who were remotely mesmerized.

Turnball Root, brother of the deceased Julius Root, hires a gang of dwarfs to take Butler and Juliet out, but they are foiled by Mulch Diggums. The three then rescue Artemis, Holly, and Foaly and all six start to pursue Turnball. Turnball catches them and places a curse on Holly and Artemis, enslaving them.

He kidnaps No. 1 to reverse the aging of his wife, but Orion, Artemis's alter ego who is not affected by the rune he was enslaved under, saves No.1 and Holly. Turnball has rigged a shuttle to explode, Leonor decides that she does not want to be young again and wishes only to fly one last time. She and Turnball Root ride deep into the ocean in the shuttle that explodes.

Artemis is his obsessive-compulsive self again and on a transport shuttle to the Argon clinic for therapy. In the gymnasium of the underwater hospital in which Turnball almost defeated the group, Juliet is engaged in a wrestling match with a jumbo pixie guard, which she is supposedly 'losing'. Artemis and Foaly are teasing Holly about her recent date with Trouble Kelp. Butler calls Angeline Fowl, telling her that Artemis has a fairy disease similar to OCD. Angeline wants to visit him and is very worried and upset. However, Butler helps her get over it and walks into the gym, knowing Juliet is faking her dwindling odds of winning the match to rig the betting pool for maximum payout when she wins.

== Sequel ==
This novel is the next-to-last book in the Artemis Fowl series. The eighth and final book, The Last Guardian, was released in 2012.
