= John Carpenter's Toxic Commando =

2026 video game

- Developer: Saber Interactive
- Publisher: Focus Entertainment
- Director: Aleksandr Larionov
- Producer: Nikolay Egorikhin
- Designer: Yaroslav Sergeev
- Programmers: Ruslan Vizgalin; Evgeniy Tsyimbalyuk
- Artist: Vladimir Tretyakov
- Writers: Oliver Hollis-Leick; Matthew Garcia-Dunn
- Composers: John Carpenter; Fractal Edge Music
- Engine: Swarm Engine
- Platforms: PlayStation 5; Windows; Xbox Series X/S
- Release: March 12, 2026
- Genre: First-person shooter
- Modes: Single-player, multiplayer

John Carpenter's Toxic Commando is a 2026 first-person shooter developed by Saber Interactive and published by Focus Entertainment. The game was released on March 12, 2026 for PlayStation 5, Windows, and Xbox Series X/S.

== Story ==
Set in the near future, a scientific experiment to harness the energy of the Earth's core goes haywire when it accidentally releases an entity called the Sludge God. It soon begins to turn the soil into scum and mankind into zombies. However, the scientists behind the experiment come up with a plan to stop the Sludge God, by hiring a team of mercenaries to eliminate the zombies and save the world.

== Development ==
During Summer Game Fest in June 2023, it was announced that John Carpenter was collaborating with Focus Entertainment and Saber Interactive for the game's development. Carpenter worked on the game's story and also composed its musical score. The game supports both multiplayer and single-player. In a recent interview, Saber Interactive Chief Creative Officer Tim Willits said his favourite way to play the game is with two friends and an AI bot, "because that one bot will always revive me, because you know your friends are never going to…", pointing towards a real need for cohesive teamwork in the zombie shooter.

== Release ==
The game was released on March 12, 2026 on PlayStation 5, Windows and Xbox Series X/S. The game was previously set to be released in 2024.

John Carpenter's Toxic Commando: Rise of the Sludge God, a tie-in prequel comic book set shortly before the events of the game, written by Michael Moreci, was published on March 24, 2024, by Dark Horse Comics.

== Reception ==
Reception

Aggregate score
| Aggregator | Score |
|---|---|
| OpenCritic | 55% recommend (Note: Based on 94 reviews.) |

Samantha Nelson of Polygon gave the game a positive preview, writing "I found all the game's controls intuitive and swapping between the many weapons was highly satisfying, leaving me eager to try more along with experimenting with other classes". Luke Addison of The Thumb Wars also gave a positive review, summarizing that "it's as mental and over-the-top as it sounds and should be".

It was a profitable project for Saber Interactive but its overall sales were disappointing for Focus Entertainment.
