= Artemis Fowl and the Lost Colony =

2006 book by Eoin Colfer

- First edition cover of Artemis Fowl and the Lost Colony
- Author: Eoin Colfer
- Illustrator: Stefan van Bolderick
- Cover artist: Melvyn Grant; Ellice M. Lee (design)
- Language: English
- Series: Artemis Fowl series
- Genre: Children's Fantasy novel
- Published: 2 August 2006 Puffin Books
- Publication place: Ireland
- Media type: Print (hardback & paperback), Audiobook CD
- Pages: 384 (first edition, hardback)
- ISBN: 0-14-138268-6 (first edition, hardback)
- OCLC: 76849597
- Preceded by: The Opal Deception (2005)
- Followed by: The Time Paradox (2008)

Artemis Fowl and the Lost Colony, known in America as Artemis Fowl: The Lost Colony, is the fifth book in the Artemis Fowl Series by Irish writer Eoin Colfer. The book, originally expected to be published in the UK and Ireland on 7 September 2006, was shipped to stores early. On 12 September of the same year, The Lost Colony became available in the US, and was released soon to other countries. It is followed by Artemis Fowl and the Time Paradox.

== Plot ==
In Barcelona, Spain, Artemis Fowl II and Butler, his bodyguard, wait for a demon. They suddenly encounter a demon who transports Artemis through time. Before Artemis is lost in time, Butler is able to get a hand on Artemis and pull him back to the present, thanks to the silver cuffs he is wearing. Meanwhile, Wing Commander Vinyáya brings Holly Short and Mulch Diggums, who have recently been working on their semi-successful PI business, to secret organization Section Eight, an elite squad whose work includes the monitoring of demon activity. The island of Hybras was lifted out of time at the battle of Taillte by the demon warlocks to allow the demons to recover so they could resume the fairy war with humans. However the process went wrong and the demons have been unable to return. Occasionally demons appear on Earth when they are pulled back due to their strong connection to the Moon. Foaly informs Holly that Artemis was able to predict such a demon materialisation when Section 8 could not. Holly is sent to ask Artemis how he could chart the information so accurately.

On Hybras, which is suspended in "Limbo" (where time is nonexistent), No.1, an imp, is bullied because he is the oldest imp not to have "warped" (changed into a mature demon), and is repulsed by the desire of his kind to return to Earth and take revenge on humanity. After accidentally turning a wooden skewer into stone, No.1 wonders if he is the first warlock since the battle of Tailte, when all the warlocks were supposedly killed during the casting of the time-spell, trapping Hybras in Limbo. Leon Abbot, the last survivor and warhero of the battle of Tailte, now leader of the demon pride, uses something suspiciously like the mesmer to urge No.1 to jump into the island's volcano (used to cast the time-spell) and reach the human world.

Artemis, Butler, and Holly arrive at the Massimo Bellini Opera House, where Artemis has predicted a demon appearance. Here again, they see a blonde girl they had encountered in Barcelona. Artemis concludes that she knows something about demons. She is identified as Minerva Paradizo. No.1 materialises in a dark corner of the stage and is immediately shot with a tranquillizer dart using a rifle disguised as a crutch by Minerva's hired mercenary, the unstable Billy Kong. Minerva leaves for her residence in France, although Holly maintains pursuit while Artemis and Butler follow by a different route. No.1, in Minerva's home, tells her about demon culture, and is slightly shocked to learn Minerva plans to put the demons in a zoo. He also learns that Leon Abbot visited this very place under care, exhibiting what appeared to be a serious case of split personality, and then took a book and a crossbow back to Hybras when he dug out his silver bullet, knowing full well that the demons stood no chance against humans of the modern day. Holly is captured trying to rescue the imp, but Artemis has Foaly recruit Mulch Diggums and the pixie criminal Doodah Day to sabotage the security of the Paradizo chateau. When Artemis distracts Minerva, Holly and No.1 escape, after the bug Day plants in wiring in the chateau allows Foaly to have the CCTV monitors show a massive military attack on the house, and destroy Minerva's research.

With most of the security in ruins, Minerva is persuaded to give up her plans. However Billy Kong has his agenda, as he wishes to kill all demons to avenge the murder of his brother, who lied about demons attacking him, when in reality he was involved in gang wars. Kong takes control of Minerva's security, and then demands Minerva retrieve another demon. She is unable to comply, and he takes her hostage. Artemis intervenes after learning No.1 may be a warlock, and strikes a deal in which he will trade No.1 for Minerva at Taipei 101 in Taiwan. Kong plans to strap a bomb onto No.1 and remove the silver bullet anchoring No.1 to this dimension, so the bomb will wipe out Hybras and the demons. However, upon the switch in Taiwan, Artemis has already removed the bullet, and has instructed No.1 to drop the silver bullet which he has been holding in his hand. When No.1 drops the bullet, he almost immediately de-materialises to escape Kong, and reappears at a nearby silver pendulum, allowing Holly to secure the demon with a bracelet. Artemis, Butler, Minerva and Holly then reach the unopened Kimsichiog Art Gallery, the real reason Artemis had Kong travel to Taiwan. The gallery shows a 10,000-year-old sculpture of "dancing figures" that are actually 4 of the 7 demon warlocks involved in the time-spell, frozen in stone. Only the leader, Qwan, who cast the spell in a last-ditch attempt to survive, has not died from shock or severe injury. No.1 manages to release Qwan, just as Kong's gang reach the gallery and try to break the door open. As Butler battles with Kong's gang, Minerva puts herself in danger, and as Butler rescues her Kong's bomb gets handcuffed to Holly. Artemis, Qwan, No.1, and Holly devise a plan to use Holly's wings to carry Artemis, Holly, and No.1 to the next building over, where Artemis can defuse the bomb. Their plan fails when Holly's wings cut out and they fall against the side of the building. Artemis then puts his backup plan into action by taking off No.1's silver bracelet, and they all dematerialise to Hybras. Artemis reasons that the bomb will provide sufficient energy for a spell to reverse the original time-spell. Qwan tells him that at least five magical beings will be necessary. They all think (with the exception of Artemis, who stole some magic in the time tunnel) that there are only three. Butler and Minerva then have Kong arrested, and Butler discreetly tells the police that Kong is wanted for murder under his original name.

On Hybras, Abbot crowns himself the demon king. He is notified that four figures, Artemis, No.1, Holly, and Qwan, have appeared on the volcano. They accuse him of using the mesmer, but he states that demons cannot use magic. Artemis claims that Abbot took magic from Qwan's apprentice in the time tunnel. When Abbot asks for proof, Artemis reveals that he stole some magic himself and demonstrates the fact by creating a spark out of the magic he took from the tunnel, unknown to his companions. With this development, there will be now five magical beings present (Abbot included), enough to reverse the time spell. Abbot then has the demons attack, and Holly is killed by the demon leader. However, Artemis takes advantage of the time spell's disintegration and consequent irregularity to bring her back to life, an experience taking him 60 experienced years. Artemis, having no experience with magic, is guided by Qwan, and the 'magic circle' is formed. However, not enough magic is available, as the unconscious Abbot does not contribute enough. When the demon leader is prompted, Qweffor, Qwan's former apprentice, makes his appearance, revealing he has been trapped in Abbot's mind after the first time spell was interrupted. With Qweffor's increased magic, the party is able to return to Artemis and Holly's dimension.

When they land back in the 21st century, Artemis notices that he has switched an eye with Holly. Even though Qweffor's consciousness has once again been taken over by Abbot, No.1 manages to expand Qweffor's consciousness enough to shut Abbot out. Unfortunately, the party is three years off into the future. Artemis and Holly are shocked to learn Ark Sool has been fired after suggesting the demon race be left to die off, and Mulch has continued the PI firm, also recruiting Doodah Day. When Artemis finds Butler, now with a beard, Butler reveals that Minerva has grown to be "quite a beautiful young woman" who talks about Artemis extensively and that he is now the big brother of twins.

== Critical reception ==
The book has received positive praise. VOYA stated that Artemis Fowl and the Lost Colony was "fast-paced, funny, and wholly enjoyable" as well as an "action-packed thrill ride through fantastic worlds".

== The Code ==
The fairy Code is written at the end of the book. This code can be used to solve the cryptic messages found in all of the Artemis Fowl books (usually found on the bottom of each page).
