= The Fowl Twins (novel) =

Book by Eoin Colfer

- Irish and UK cover
- Author: Eoin Colfer
- Cover artist: Goni Montez
- Language: English
- Series: The Fowl Twins
- Genre: Crime, action and adventure
- Publisher: Viking Press/Disney Hyperion
- Publication date: 5 November 2019
- Publication place: Ireland
- Media type: Print
- Pages: 368
- ISBN: 978-1-368052-56-6
- Preceded by: The Last Guardian
- Followed by: Deny All Charges

The Fowl Twins is the first novel in Eoin Colfer's The Fowl Twins series, a spin-off and continuation of the Artemis Fowl series and second cycle of The Fowl Adventures, following Myles and Beckett Fowl, the younger twin brothers of criminal mastermind Artemis Fowl II. The Fowl Twins was released 5 November 2019 by Viking Press and Disney Hyperion, promoting the then-upcoming Artemis Fowl film adaptation for Disney+. The novel was well-received by critics, reviews comparing its quality and success to that of the original series. The novel also features the returns of the characters of Ishi Myishi (from Colfer's 2001 novel The Wish List) and Diavolo Conroy (from Colfer's 2016 novel Iron Man: The Gauntlet).

== Background ==
Colfer stated writing Artemis Fowl and the Last Guardian that he had had "enough" with the series, opting to take a "breather" from it in favor of other projects, stating with regards the writing of The Fowl Twins that "[i]t would probably be a lot easier if I was on Artemis 15 by now. I just find I get bored, and if I get bored, the work suffers", having decided to return to the Fowl series after having "had too many stories running around in [his] head to ignore", referencing that while it is "not very Irish to be proud of something, but I started to feel a pride in the [Fowl] world. I'm kind of a curmudgeon, really, but I went back into it more positively." Colfer cited Carysfort College as the inspiration for Spanish antagonistic spy-nun Sister Jeronima. The characters of Ishi Myishi from Colfer's 2001 novel The Wish List and Garda Inspector/Irish Army Commander Diavolo Conroy from Colfer's 2016 novel Iron Man: The Gauntlet return in The Fowl Twins.

== Reception ==
Critical reception for The Fowl Twins was positive, meeting with praise from most reviewers. Kirkus Reviews praised the book, writing that: "Like its bestselling progenitors, [The Fowl Twins] is a nonstop spinoff afroth with high tech, spectacular magic, and silly business." The Times praised the novel as "another wildly imaginative adventure" from Colfer, in particular the "wildly different natures" of the titular Fowl twins and how they "drive the story", while The Chicago Tribune acknowledged the novel as the "best children's book of 2019". Tampa Bay Times complimented the novel's character dynamics as "a little magical mayhem" for those who feel "[the] real world is getting on your nerves".
