= Artemis Fowl and the Arctic Incident =

Book by Eoin Colfer

- First edition cover
- Author: Eoin Colfer
- Language: English
- Series: Artemis Fowl series
- Genre: Children's, Fantasy novel
- Publisher: Hyperion Books
- Publication date: May 2002
- Publication place: Ireland
- Media type: Print (hardcover and paperback), audiobook, e-book
- Pages: 277 (first edition, hardback)
- ISBN: 978-0-43945070-6
- OCLC: 49778083
- LC Class: MLCS 2006/41940 (P)
- Preceded by: Artemis Fowl (2001)
- Followed by: The Seventh Dwarf (2004); The Eternity Code (2003)

Artemis Fowl and the Arctic Incident, known in America as Artemis Fowl: The Arctic Incident, is a young adult and fantasy novel written by Irish author Eoin Colfer, published in 2002. It is the second book in the Artemis Fowl series, preceded by Artemis Fowl and followed by Artemis Fowl: The Eternity Code. It follows the adventures of the twelve-year-old criminal mastermind, Artemis Fowl II, as he thwarts a goblin rebellion and rescues his father, Artemis Fowl I. The third-person narration switches back and forth constantly, allowing the reader to understand more of what is going on. A New York Times bestseller, the novel was well received by critics, and reviews compared its quality and success to those of its predecessor.

== Plot ==
The story opens at the Bay of Kola, just after the Russian Mafia have sunk the Fowl Star. Two low-ranking Mafia members discover the body of the former Irish crime lord Artemis Fowl I, who has survived despite losing a leg and the use of one eye. Three years later, his son and heir Artemis Fowl II, while at school talking to the guidance counselor, Dr. Po, receives a call from his manservant and bodyguard Butler. Butler shows Artemis a video of his father, showing that he is in the hands of the Mafia. Knowing that a ransom demand will soon be coming, and that payment will in no way guarantee his father's release or his own safety, Artemis prepares to devise a plan while Butler drives them back to Fowl Manor.

While Artemis Fowl's plight plays out above ground, the Lower Elements Police of the fairy realm are having their own problems. A routine stakeout group consisting of the disgraced Captain Holly Short and Private Chix Verbil is attacked by a group of heavily armed goblins carrying old outlawed Softnose weaponry powered by human batteries, a Class A contraband. Captain Short is quick to accuse young Artemis Fowl and against his own wishes, LEP Commander Julius Root sends Holly to apprehend Artemis Fowl and Butler for interrogation. However, Foaly's Retimager proves Artemis's innocence. Against Holly's instincts, Root decides to recruit Fowl and Butler to locate the supplier; Artemis agrees, on the condition that they help him rescue his father.

Unknown to all, the attacks are being organised by Briar Cudgeon, a former LEP Lieutenant disgraced, deformed and demoted following his disastrous involvement in the Artemis Fowl affair. Briar is working alongside Foaly's biggest technology rival, the megalomanic pixie Opal Koboi, who is above suspicion thanks to the fact the goblins have been staging attacks on Koboi property. Neither are concerned by Root's attempts to find out the truth, and choose to bide their time so they can kill him, and begin their plan to take over Haven once he is out of the way.

Foaly's investigation points to French personal investigator Luc Carrére. Holly leads a squad consisting of Root, Artemis and Butler, and herself above ground to France to interrogate Luc. Butler breaks into his apartment in Paris, but finds only a heavily mesmerized Luc, counterfeit Euros, and a fairy handgun. Butler neutralises Luc, ensures the Parisian knows nothing of the goblin use of batteries, and leaves the private eye to be arrested. Although Artemis is concerned by the ease of the operation, he puts aside his concerns to travel to Murmansk with Butler, Root and Holly to attempt a rescue for Artemis Fowl I. Cudgeon sees this as the perfect opportunity to kill Root, and sends a goblin hit squad to ambush the party. The goblins nearly succeed in killing the four as all fairy weapons currently in use by the force have just been disabled by Koboi. The resulting attack leaves Butler unconscious and trapped under rubble from an overhang with Commander Root. Holly and Artemis use a nuclear train to free Root and Butler, but the group is then forced to perform an emergency healing when the train door cuts off Holly's trigger finger. Holly questions Artemis about his father and how he came to be so ruthless in the events of the previous book, and, in a rare moment of sincerity, Artemis admits he made a mistake, a sign of his moral development that continues through the series.

Below ground, Briar Cudgeon ambushes and locks Foaly in his Operations Booth, while Opal disables LEP weapons, framing him as the mastermind behind the rebellion against the LEP and leaving the rescue group powerless to stop the goblins as they begin their attack on Haven city. The situation becomes increasingly desperate for the LEP in Haven, as Foaly uses Artemis's laptop to send a text message to the boy's phone, alerting the rescue group that all fairy weapons and communications are controlled by Opal Koboi.

Having received the secret message, Artemis decides the only option is to break into Koboi Laboratories and return all weapon control to the LEP, interrupting the rescue mission. Root bitterly acknowledges the only fairy who ever succeeded in doing so was the kleptomaniac dwarf Mulch Diggums, who had worked as a builder of the facility, but was presumed dead following his break-in to Fowl Manor. Holly then reveals that Foaly had a hunch that Mulch had survived by placing the iris cam that scanned his vitals into local wildlife. Foaly realized that some of the gold returned by Artemis to the fairies was missing, and then traced several bars to Los Angeles, where Mulch was living as diminutive millionaire and legendary Oscar thief. The group then head to Los Angeles and apprehend Mulch once again.

Root threatens Mulch with imprisonment in the goblin prison Howler's Peak, and offers the dwarf a two-day head start if he assists in the break-in. The team use Mulch's original strategy to enter through one of the titanium foundation rods. One rod was not actually solid as Mulch and his cousin had diverted sewage into the shaft instead. After reaching the bottom of the foundation rod, and climbing through Mulch's recyclings, Butler, Root and Holly mount a desperate charge to the communications centre. While the three soldiers battle through an army of goblins, Artemis enters the network of deactivated plasma cannons to reach the centre by another route. Artemis manages to sneak into the hub long enough to communicate with Foaly, who uses Artemis's laptop to play back Cudgeon's own voice, revealing that Cudgeon planned to betray the goblins. Cudgeon is unfazed, and reactivates the plasma cannons to knock out all the goblins in Koboi Labs. Butler, Root and Holly smash their way into the centre, where Cudgeon holds Artemis at gunpoint. However, Foaly calls Artemis' mobile phone, and Artemis hands it to Koboi, who is then enraged to find that Cudgeon planned to betray her too. The two masterminds grapple with each other on Opal's hoverchair, and Cudgeon is killed when he is thrown into the open DNA cannon plasma feed, while the crash causes Opal to blackout, and destroys the remote control used by Opal to control LEP weaponry. Foaly uses the restored power to activate DNA cannons in Police Plaza, neutralizing most of the goblins involved in the revolt. As the LEP outside, commanded by Captain Trouble Kelp, still think he is to blame for the revolt, Foaly refuses to emerge from the Operations Booth until Root returns and exonerates him, while also purging any remaining Koboi tech from the LEP's systems.

Artemis, Holly, Butler and Root then head to Murmansk and rescue Artemis Fowl I. Artemis's plan to fake the shooting of his father nearly ends in disaster when the Russians throw the man overboard, but Holly manages to rescue Artemis Senior and heal his most severe injuries, apart from his lost leg. The Russian Mafia are foiled in their attempt to take the money, as Artemis has Foaly run up some fake notes that will dissolve upon being delivered to their boss. The group return to Europe where Holly deposits Artemis Fowl I on the steps of a hospital in Helsinki. The story closes with Dr. Po asking Artemis if he has learned anything and found a person he admires. Artemis, thinking of his father and the many who helped to rescue him, then answers "Yes, I believe I have."

== Critical reception ==
Critical reception was generally positive. January Magazine noted that after the success of the novel's predecessor, Arctic Incident had "a lot to live up to". The review said the novel was "refreshing and innovative". It lauded Colfer's continual expansion of characters. Kirkus Reviews praised the novel's "puns, word plays, and inventive new concepts about the fairy realm" and called the book an "exhilarating Celtic caper" that would "delight fans and make converts of new readers". The reviews, however, were not all positive. While Publishers Weekly described the novel as a "cracking good read," the review cautioned that Colfer "ratchets up the body count...perhaps too steeply for some tastes" and that "the high-concept premise may be a tad slick for others". Goodtoread.org did not receive the book as positively, citing Butler and Artemis' awkward relationship and Artemis as "an unconvincing 13-year-old genius". However, the reviews concluded that the book was "interesting enough".
