= Artemis Fowl II =

- Artemis Fowl character
- Artemis Fowl II, as depicted in Artemis Fowl: The Graphic Novel
- First appearance: Artemis Fowl
- Last appearance: The Fowl Twins
- Created by: Eoin Colfer
- Portrayed by: Ferdia Shaw
- Inspired by: Hans Gruber by; Jeb Stuart; Steven E. de Souza; Anton Gruber by Roderick Thorp

In-universe information
- Aliases: Artemis the Hunter; Artemis Fowl, Jr.; F. Roy Dean Schlippe; Stefan Bashkir; Emmsey Squire; Dr. C. Niall DeMencha; Sir E. Brum; Malachy Pasteur; Violet Tsirblou; Alfonse Lee
- Species: Human (originally); Human-elf hybrid (from The Lost Colony onward); Human clone (from The Last Guardian onward)
- Gender: Male
- Title: Doctor
- Occupation: Criminal mastermind; Chess champion; Romance novelist (The Atlantis Complex); Astronaut (The Fowl Twins)
- Family: Artemis Fowl I (father); Angeline Fowl (mother); Beckett Fowl (younger brother); Myles Fowl (youngest brother); Orion Fowl (dissociative identity); Lord Hugh Fowl (ancestor); Peg O'Connor Fowl (ancestor)
- Significant others: Holly Short (The Time Paradox); Minerva Paradizo (formerly; The Fowl Twins Get What They Deserve)
- Children: NANNI (artificial intelligence)
- Nationality: Irish
- Birth: 1 September 1984

Dr. Artemis Fowl II is the eponymous character of the Artemis Fowl series by Eoin Colfer. Colfer has said that he based Artemis on his younger brother Donal, who as a child was "a mischievous mastermind who could get out of any trouble he got into." A childhood picture of his brother in his first communion suit caused Colfer to think of how much Colfer's brother resembled "a little James Bond villain" and "how funny...a twelve-year-old James Bond villain" would be, inspiring Colfer's creation of Artemis.

Colfer planned for Artemis to have been called Archimedes but changed the name due to an interest in using a "classic Greek name" and trepidation that "people would think [the series] was about [the historical figure] Archimedes". Artemis is a notable choice for a name because while it is traditionally a female name, it "was [historically] sometimes... given to boys as a kind of honorific if their fathers were great hunters", though the male equivalent of the name is usually spelled as Artimus instead of Artemis. Fowl was derived from the Irish name Fowler as a play on words to convey the characterization that Artemis was a nasty or foul individual at the beginning of the series. The character additionally takes the place of Hans Gruber in Colfer's description of the first book of the series as "Die Hard with fairies".

== Fictional character biography ==
Prior to the events of the first book, Artemis' father, Artemis Fowl I, imperils the family fortune by investing "a huge chunk of the Fowl fortune in establishing new shipping lanes" to Russia, following the breakdown of Communism there. The Russian Mafia retaliates by sinking a shipping vessel Artemis I was travelling on, the Fowl Star, leading to his disappearance, the loss of a substantial amount of the Fowl fortune, and the mental breakdown of his wife Angeline Fowl, Artemis' mother.

In Artemis Fowl, which is set two years after those events, the 12-year-old Artemis decides to regain the Fowl fortune by following leads on the Internet that refer to an underground world of fairies collectively called the People. Artemis manages to blackmail a member of the People into giving him what they call "the Book" which is like their Bible, holding all their secrets, customs, rules, and history. This leads him to ransom Lower Elements Police (LEP) Captain Holly Short for a portion of the People's gold. Artemis and Holly agree to a deal whereby Holly retains half the ransom fee, while Artemis gets one wish from Holly and gets to keep the other half of the gold. After recovering Holly, the LEP attempt to permanently eliminate Artemis by setting off a biological weapon, but are thwarted when Artemis discovers a way around their attack (something not even the People had been able to develop).

In the sequel, The Arctic Incident, the 13-year-old Artemis learns that his father was only injured in the attack on his shipping vessel, and is being held hostage by the Russian Mafia. Artemis barters with the People to receive their aid in rescuing his father in exchange for assisting them in solving the mystery of who was behind a goblin rebellion. It is later revealed that Opal Koboi, a pixie criminal mastermind, and ex-LEP officer Briar Cudgeon are behind the plot. Their plan is thwarted, ending in Cudgeon's death and Koboi's arrest, and Artemis successfully recovers his father.

In the third book, The Eternity Code, Artemis (in what he considers to be his last criminal act before his father recovers from his injuries) creates the C Cube, a mini super-computer based on the People's technology that is decades ahead of human technology. Artemis at the end of the book has to agree to Butler's, Juliet's and his own memories being wiped by the People, to avoid future misadventures.

In the fourth book, The Opal Deception, Artemis gets nearly terminated with a biological weapon from Opal. Holly rescues Artemis after being injured while escaping Opal's weapon. But Opal still seeks revenge on Holly and Artemis, so she traps them in an abandoned amusement park with only hungry trolls for company. Artemis is saved when his memories are later returned. With help from Artemis, Butler, and Mulch, Holly prevents Opal from achieving her goal to uncover the Fairy People to humans.

In the fifth book, The Lost Colony, Artemis works with the People to recover a young kidnapped demon imp from the 12-year-old child prodigy Minerva Paradizo. In the process, several significant changes occur within the characters' lives. Artemis receives a small amount of magical power during the trip to Limbo, and swaps an eye with Holly on the return trip. The pair finds that they have been transported nearly three years into their future. Finally, Artemis learns that in the ensuing time he has become the older brother to twins, Beckett and Myles Fowl.

In the sixth book, The Time Paradox, Artemis' mother Angeline Fowl becomes gravely ill with a rare fairy disease called Spelltropy. Artemis attempts to cure her with his remaining magic, but it only serves to worsen her condition. The only cure for Spelltropy is found in the brain fluid of the Silky Sifaka Lemur, the last of which Artemis sold in a business deal when he was ten years old, resulting in the extinction of the species. Artemis goes to the past to rescue the last lemur from his younger self. After several misadventures, Artemis recovers the lemur but learns that his mother's illness was a ruse plotted by Opal Koboi, who wanted the lemur's brain fluid to increase her own magical powers. Artemis ruins Opal's plans by bringing his ten-year-old self into the present and fooling Opal, saving his mother in the process. After Opal is defeated, Artemis' 10-year-old self has his mind wiped by Nº1, but retains a brief memory of the existence of fairies, which spurs him to research them, ultimately leading to the events of the first book, which is one of the reasons Artemis is loved so much.

In the seventh book, The Atlantis Complex, Artemis contracts a mental disease called Atlantis Complex disease, similar to OCD, and now has an alter-ego named Orion, who is in love with Holly Short. Due to the disease, Artemis finds himself obsessed with the number 5 and irrationally fearing the number 4. The disease worsens throughout the novel, leading to his distrust of close friends. A neutrino shock from Holly Short frees Artemis' alter-ego Orion but he comes back after being knocked out by a buzz baton blow from Holly. He later undergoes Atlantis Complex Disease treatment by the fairies, curing him and restoring his former self.

In the eighth book, The Last Guardian, Artemis must save humankind by stopping the crazed pixie Opal Koboi. Opal kills her younger self (who followed Artemis and Holly to the present in the sixth book) to gain enough black magic to open a magical gate, which has been under the Fowl Manor for a millennium, and so release the Berserkers (ancient fairy warriors). Then Artemis must fight his brothers, who have been taken over by the Berserker souls. He sacrifices himself at the conclusion of the book to trigger an ancient spell that disperses Opal and her various fairy spirits, but since his spirit was human (apart from some traces of fairy magic from Holly's borrowed eye), his essence endures at the location of the spell long enough for Holly and Foaly to clone a new body for him and transfer his soul into it. Although the process leaves him with missing memories, the book ends with Butler, Holly and Foaly immediately beginning work to restore them.

In The Fowl Twins, the first of a series of novels focusing on Artemis' younger twin brothers Beckett and Myles, it is mentioned that Artemis is currently six months into a five-year mission to Mars in a wind-up rocket he built in the family barn. In the third book, The Fowl Twins Get What They Deserve, Minerva Paradizo mentions that prior to meeting her sprite husband and having a daughter with him, she and Artemis had briefly explored a relationship. Artemis himself remains in space for the remainder of the series.

== Characterization ==
=== Family history ===
Artemis Fowl II is the son of Artemis Fowl I and Angeline Fowl. He is a brother to younger twins Beckett and Myles Fowl. As shown in the fifth and seventh book, Artemis' birthday is 1 September. The Fowls are a family of "legendary criminals" whose history dates back to at least the Norman Conquest that have amassed a fortune through both legitimate and illegitimate means. Working alongside the Fowls is the Butler family, a centuries-old line of trained bodyguards that form lifelong affiliations with members of the Fowl family. The family motto is Aurum Est Potestas, (Gold is Power), which is written in Latin. Artemis Fowl I underwent reform following his kidnapping and has joined Angeline Fowl in her humanitarian and environmentalist efforts.

=== Physical appearance ===
Artemis is described as having pale skin, deep blue eyes, ruggedly handsome, premature wrinkling near the eyes, and raven black hair, and is said to resemble his father. As of his adventures in The Lost Colony, Artemis has exchanged one eye with Holly Short as a result of a botched re-materialization and now possesses one blue eye and one hazel eye, and a time travel in The Time Paradox aged him to his chronological age of 18 but then back again upon his return to his own time. A similar re-materialization resulted in the swapping of the index and second fingers on his left hand. As of The Last Guardian, Artemis has reverted to his image as it was at the start of the series due to being placed in a new body grown by Foaly when he lost his during Opal's attempt to dominate the world and wipe out the human race.

=== Personality ===
Colfer describes Artemis' personality at the beginning of the series as being difficult. A description of the twelve-year-old Artemis in The Artemis Fowl Files finds that "he may isolate himself completely from anyone wishing to be his friend and, ultimately, from his family too". However, Artemis also reveals in the same text that Butler is his best friend. Later in the series, Artemis realizes that his adventures and new friendships have changed him for the better. Foaly later acknowledges Artemis as a friend of the People. Ultimately, Artemis uses his abilities to help the People because he feels that he owes them for the past trouble he has caused, and he misses the challenges that their problems present.

On the other hand, his 'alternate personality' (Orion) is almost the opposite. He is childish and possibly over-familiar, addressing Foaly as the 'noble steed' and treating Holly as his 'fair maiden'. His use of language is also very different, speaking as if he is a knight in a fantastical dragon-slaying story. The intention of Artemis' development has been to explore the development of a "boy [that] becomes a young man and learns that avarice is not as important as family." Colfer has noted that once Artemis "gets completely good, that's it" for his criminal ways.

=== Relationships ===
During The Lost Colony, Artemis meets a girl named Minerva Paradizo, another child prodigy aware of the existence of magic, and develops an apparent attraction to her, but this relationship is not fully explored before Artemis and Holly are transferred to the Lost Colony, where they remain for about three years, limiting Artemis' potential interest in getting back in contact with her. She is not mentioned in any of the other books. Artemis may have a possible romantic relationship with Holly Short. Though they start out as fierce enemies, they gradually learn to respect each other, and then to like each other. By the end of the fourth book they are good friends, and in the last book is described as having "tremendous affection for his fierce and beautiful best friend."

In The Time Paradox, the two kiss and seem to take pleasure in it, although Holly was suffering from somewhat disturbed hormones due to the time travel disrupting her body's chemistry. Also, in The Atlantis Complex, Artemis' alter ego, Orion, confesses his love to Holly and tries to woo her, although she is unnerved by his advances. In the last book, Artemis and Holly are in a crisis and Artemis finally realizes his affection for Holly and kisses her on the forehead which seems to be solely for romantic reasons, however, it is later revealed that this was also for the practical reason of allowing Foaly to have access to Artemis' DNA sample to create a clone and revive him. In The Fowl Twins Get What They Deserve, Minerva Paradizo reveals that she and Artemis had briefly explored having a relationship between the events of the Artemis Fowl and The Fowl Twins series, before she had left him for a sprite, with whom she had a hybrid daughter.

He obviously cares deeply for his mother, father, and brothers, and where they are concerned, acts much like a young boy who just wants to be taken care of by his parents. He also cares about Domovoi Butler very much, and has an ongoing rivalry with Foaly over who is more brilliant. He also has a pseudo-friendship with Mulch, and it is Mulch who eventually delivers the disk that helps him restore his memory after the events of The Eternity Code. Many details of Artemis' personal life are left open ended. As is stated in the first book, "[those questions] can only be answered by one person. And he delights in not talking."

=== Skills and abilities ===
Artemis is a child prodigy and is known to have the highest tested IQ in Europe. He is described as "a plotter...[and]...a schemer" with "the ability to visualize a hypothetical situation and calculate the likely outcomes". In addition to these abilities, Artemis holds several other fringe talents. He is ambidextrous, but his left hand is slightly steadier (his other personality, Orion, is also ambidextrous, but favours his right hand). Between the events of The Lost Colony and The Time Paradox, Artemis holds a small amount of clandestinely gathered magic from his extra-dimensional travels. The magic gives him symptoms of being a magical being, such as nausea upon entering a building uninvited, though the ability was lost after a failed healing on his mother. As "Orion", he expresses more physical coordination than as "Artemis", showing "a nimbleness that anyone who knew the boy would not associate with him".

== Valuables and possessions ==
Artemis has accessed many possessions for implementing his plots throughout the series. Those include his computers and the cache of Lower Elements Police equipment collected during the events of the first book. One of his most prized possessions given to him by Holly Short at the end of The Arctic Incident was a fairy coin that she shot a hole through using the trigger finger he and Julius Root helped her to heal, to remind him "that deep beneath the layers of deviousness...[he has]...a spark of decency".

Artemis' exact cash worth is uncertain, but he is known to have stolen approximately $15 million worth of gold from the fairy ransom fund, in the original novel. In the third book, after Jon Spiro's attempt on his life, Artemis retaliated by completely draining his accounts. He donated the bulk of the money to Amnesty International, but chose to keep ten percent of it (about $300 million) for himself.

He has appeared on the Forbes Fictional 15 three times, placing third on the list in 2011, with a net worth of approximately $13,500,000,000.
