= List of Artemis Fowl characters =

This is a list of characters in the Artemis Fowl novel series by Eoin Colfer.

== Overview ==
List indicators
- A dark grey cell indicates that the character was not in the property or that the character's presence in the property has yet to be announced.
- A Main indicates a character had a starring role in the property.
- A Recurring indicates the character appeared in two or more times within the property.
- A Guest indicates the character appeared once in the property.

Character	Artemis Fowl book series										The Fowl Twins Trilogy	2020 Film
Character	Artemis Fowl	_{The Arctic Incident}	_{The Eternity Code}	_{The Opal Deception}	_{The Lost Colony}	_{The Time Paradox}	_{The Atlantis Complex}	_{The Last Guardian}	Short stories		The Fowl Twins Trilogy	2020 Film
Character	Artemis Fowl	_{The Arctic Incident}	_{The Eternity Code}	_{The Opal Deception}	_{The Lost Colony}	_{The Time Paradox}	_{The Atlantis Complex}	_{The Last Guardian}	_{The Seventh Dwarf}	LEPrecon	The Fowl Twins Trilogy	2020 Film
Character	2001	2002	2003	2005	2006	2008	2010	2012	2004		2019–2021	2020
Main characters
Artemis Fowl II	Main	Main	Main	Main	Main	Main	Main	Main	Main		Guest	Main
Domovoi Butler	Main	Main	Main	Main	Main	Main	Main	Main	Main		Guest	Main
Holly Short	Main	Main	Main	Main	Main	Main	Main	Main	Main	Main	Main	Main
Foaly	Main	Main	Main	Main	Main	Main	Main	Main	Main	Main	Main	Main
Mulch Diggums Lance Digger Mo Digence	Main	Main	Main	Main	Main	Main	Main	Main	Main		Guest	Main
Julius Root Beetroot	Main	Main	Main	Main		Guest			Guest	Main		Main
N°1					Main	Guest	Guest	Guest				
Minerva Paradizo					Main	Guest					Recurring	
Orion Fowl							Main					
Myles Fowl						Recurring	Recurring	Recurring			Main	
Beckett Fowl						Recurring	Recurring	Recurring			Main	
Antagonists
Briar Cudgeon	Main	Main										Main
Opal Koboi		Main	Guest	Main		Main		Main				Main
Jon Spiro			Main									
Ark Sool				Main	Guest		Recurring					
Leon Abbot N'zall					Main							
Dr. Damon Kronski						Main						
Turnball Root							Main			Main		
Oro of the Danu								Main				
Queen Bellico								Main				

== A ==
=== Leon Abbot ===
Leon Abbot (born N'zall)
- Artemis Fowl character
- First appearance: Book 5: Artemis Fowl and the Lost Colony
- Created by: Eoin Colfer

In-universe information
- Species: Demon
- Gender: Male

Leon Abbot emerges as the primary antagonist in Artemis Fowl: The Lost Colony. Described as a demon opposing the time-spell during the battle of Taillte, he disrupts a circle of warlocks engaged in a spellcasting ritual. Abbot adopts the demon name N'zall, translating to "little horn" in ancient demon language, which reflects his resentment toward older demons. However, he prefers the moniker "Leon Abbot," derived from a character in the book Lady Heatherington Smythe's Hedgerow, whom he admires.

While Holly speculates that Abbot has acquired situational narcissism, author Eoin Colfer portrays him as "psychopathic" in "The Time Paradox." To prevent him from causing harm, Abbot's consciousness is transferred to a guinea pig in Artemis Fowl: The Lost Colony.

=== Amorphobots ===
In "Artemis Fowl: The Atlantis Complex," the Amorphobots are introduced as gelatinous robots crafted by Foaly for a Mars probe mission. However, Turnball Root seizes control of these robots, repurposing them to reroute the probe back to Earth. His aim is to orchestrate a prison escape, leveraging the Amorphobots' capabilities for his rescue mission.

=== Jerbal Argon ===
Dr. Jerbal Argon
- Artemis Fowl character
- First appearance: Book 1: Artemis Fowl
- Last appearance: Book 8: Artemis Fowl: The Last Guardian
- Created by: Eoin Colfer

In-universe information
- Species: Gnome
- Gender: Male

Jerbal Argon is a recurring character in the Artemis Fowl series, first introduced in the inaugural book. Initially depicted as an observer, he later emerges as the proprietor of a health clinic. In "Artemis Fowl: The Opal Deception," Argon tends to Opal Koboi, a prominent patient in a self-induced coma, whose presence ensures financial support for the clinic. Despite Koboi's manipulative influence, Argon demonstrates reluctance to release her due to the financial benefits.

In subsequent installments, such as "Artemis Fowl: The Atlantis Complex" and "Artemis Fowl: The Last Guardian," Argon continues to play a significant role, overseeing the treatment of key characters. His interactions with the Brill brothers, his pixie custodians, reveal a disdain for the nickname "Jerry," underscoring his desire for greater respect from clinic employees, albeit unvoiced due to the rarity of competent staff.

== B ==
=== Arno Blunt ===
Arno Blunt
- Artemis Fowl character
- First appearance: Book 3: Artemis Fowl: The Eternity Code
- Created by: Eoin Colfer

In-universe information
- Species: Human
- Gender: Male

Arno Blunt serves as a secondary antagonist in Artemis Fowl: The Eternity Code. Employed as a bodyguard by Jon Spiro, an American businessman, Blunt's appearance is characterized by bleached-blond hair, tattoos, and distinctive attire, including pirate earrings and a cut-off T-shirt. Notably, he harbors a strong aversion to being disregarded or overlooked.

Throughout the narrative, Blunt undergoes significant dental modifications, with all his teeth being replaced by multiple sets of customized dentures, each serving distinct purposes. His reckless and aggressive demeanor is exemplified by his attempt to assassinate Artemis Fowl II, which results in the severe injury of Domovoi Butler, Artemis's bodyguard.

In a climactic confrontation, Blunt's plans to ambush Artemis are thwarted by Butler, who assumes a deceptive guise, prompting Blunt to confess his actions. Contrasted with Butler's composed and discreet nature, Blunt epitomizes a brash and conspicuous counterpart, despite sharing the same professional role and physical stature.

=== Mervall and Descant Brill ===
Mervall Brill
- Artemis Fowl character
- First appearance: Book 4: Artemis Fowl: The Opal Deception
- Last appearance: Book 6: Artemis Fowl: The Time Paradox
- Created by: Eoin Colfer

In-universe information
- Species: Pixie
- Gender: Male

Descant Brill
- Artemis Fowl character
- First appearance: Book 4: Artemis Fowl: The Opal Deception
- Last appearance: Book 6: Artemis Fowl: The Time Paradox
- Created by: Eoin Colfer

In-universe information
- Species: Pixie
- Gender: Male

Mervall and Descant Brill, commonly known as "the Brill brothers," are twin pixies featured in Artemis Fowl: The Opal Deception. While Mervall, the elder twin, is regarded as the more intelligent of the two, they share a close bond, often completing each other's sentences. Their rare status as fairy twins contributes to their celebrity-like recognition in the Lower Elements, especially given the even rarer occurrence of pixie twins.

Aligned with Opal Koboi, the Brill brothers serve as her loyal agents, showcasing competence and unwavering dedication. Initially tasked with janitorial duties at the J. Argon clinic, they execute a power disruption to facilitate Koboi's escape, replacing her with a clone. Throughout the narrative, they fulfill various roles for Koboi, including piloting her shuttle, providing security, and culinary responsibilities.

However, Koboi's demeanor shifts drastically following her rescue, exhibiting paranoia and a dictatorial attitude towards the brothers. Imposing stringent rules upon them, she demands obedience, prohibits certain behaviors, and claims psychic abilities, fostering resentment among the Brill brothers. Despite their disillusionment, fear and promises of freedom deter them from disloyalty.

Ultimately, Koboi's betrayal culminates in ejecting the brothers from her shuttle, leaving them stranded. Though presumed dead, they survive and provide critical information to Foaly about Koboi's schemes after being rescued.

In "Artemis Fowl: The Time Paradox," the brothers reappear in a younger form, aiding a past version of Opal Koboi in enhancing her magical powers. However, their involvement leads to a confrontation with Koboi, resulting in a narrow escape from her wrath, underscoring the precariousness of their allegiance to her.

=== Domovoi Butler ===
Domovoi Butler
- Artemis Fowl character
- First appearance: Book 1: Artemis Fowl
- Last appearance: Book 8: Artemis Fowl: The Last Guardian
- Created by: Eoin Colfer

In-universe information
- Species: Human
- Gender: Male

Domovoi Butler serves as Artemis Fowl II's dedicated bodyguard, continuing a long-standing tradition within the Butler family lineage dating back to the Norman conquest. With a formidable physique standing nearly seven feet tall and weighing 200 kilograms, he possesses deep blue eyes characteristic of his lineage.

Trained extensively at Madame Ko's Bodyguard Academy, Butler is proficient in various disciplines, including Cordon Bleu cooking, marksmanship, martial arts, emergency medicine, and information technology. He is renowned as the third deadliest individual globally.

In Artemis Fowl, Butler achieves a historic feat by disarming an elite squadron of the LEPretrieval fairy police force and defeating a troll using antique armor, alongside his sister Juliet. This incident, broadcast on fairy television, contributes to the LEP's combat curriculum. Throughout the series, Butler's expertise and experience make him a trusted advisor to Artemis, particularly in matters involving the fairy world.

Following an encounter in "Artemis Fowl: The Arctic Incident," Butler utilizes special goggles enabling him to perceive fairies even when they are concealed. In "Artemis Fowl: The Eternity Code," he sustains severe injuries but is preserved by cryogenic means, later revived by Captain Holly Short. Despite his miraculous recovery, Butler's aging process accelerates, leading to physical challenges. In "Artemis Fowl: The Last Guardian," he survives an attack by Opal Koboi's beserkers but sustains permanent heart damage, ending his fieldwork career.

Outside his protective duties, Butler finds solace in reading fiction, introduced to him by Minerva Paradizo. His literary interests encompass classics such as "Moby Dick," "Gormenghast," "The Art of War," and "Gone with the Wind." on the book shelf of Butler's residence in the fictional village of Duncade, Ireland, where he was awaiting Artemis's return.

=== Juliet Butler ===
Juliet Butler
- Artemis Fowl character
- First appearance: Book 1: Artemis Fowl
- Last appearance: Book 8: Artemis Fowl: The Last Guardian
- Created by: Eoin Colfer

In-universe information
- Species: Human
- Gender: Female

Juliet Butler, the younger sister of Domovoi Butler, is introduced in Artemis Fowl, as a charming but initially clueless character. While she doesn't play a significant role in the kidnapping of Holly Short, she occasionally oversees the imprisoned fairy.

In "Artemis Fowl: The Eternity Code," Juliet undergoes training at Madame Ko's academy, aiming to acquire the skills mastered by her brother. Despite her initially flighty demeanor, Juliet demonstrates exceptional marksmanship, capable of hitting any moving target with precision. However, she fails to attain the coveted blue diamond tattoo awarded to Madame Ko's bodyguards due to a lack of discipline.

Returning to her brother's side after he is shot, Juliet aids Artemis in thwarting an assassination attempt by an American hitman and participates in the heist of the Spiro Needle to retrieve the C Cube. Realizing her true calling, Juliet decides to pursue a career as a professional wrestler under the alias "Jade Princess," departing for America.

In The Last Guardian, Juliet falls under the control of berserkers, posing a threat to her loved ones. She is manipulated into attacking Domovoi Butler while caring for Myles and Beckett Fowl, highlighting the dangers of her altered state.

== C ==
=== Caballine ===
Caballine
- Artemis Fowl character
- First appearance: Book 5: Artemis Fowl: The Lost Colony
- Last appearance: Book 8: Artemis Fowl: The Last Guardian
- Created by: Eoin Colfer

In-universe information
- Species: Centaur
- Gender: Female

Caballine, also known as Caballine Wanderford Paddox Foaly, is introduced as Foaly's love interest in Artemis Fowl: The Lost Colony. A researcher for PPTV and a sculptor, she forms a connection with Foaly through discussions about his mood blanket. They establish a routine of jogging together each morning, except during emergencies.

Their relationship deepens in Artemis Fowl: The Time Paradox, where Foaly and Caballine marry during Artemis' and Holly's three-year absence while time traveling. Foaly recalls their initial encounter when Caballine was mistakenly identified as a goblin bank robber by his security systems, a humorous anecdote they share.

In "Artemis Fowl: The Last Guardian," Caballine becomes a target of Opal Koboi's assassination attempt, orchestrated by sending escaped goblin criminals after her. Utilizing her knowledge of the "ancient centaurian martial art of Nine Sticks," Caballine manages to delay the attackers, allowing Foaly to intervene and rescue her by initiating a time stop.

=== Briar Cudgeon ===
Briar Cudgeon
- Artemis Fowl character
- First appearance: Book 1: Artemis Fowl
- Last appearance: Book 2: Artemis Fowl: The Arctic Incident
- Created by: Eoin Colfer

In-universe information
- Species: Elf
- Gender: Male

Briar Cudgeon first appears in Artemis Fowl as a power-hungry officer within the LEP (Lower Elements Police). During a mission at Fowl Manor, he plots to betray Commander Julius Root in a bid to seize control. His scheme involves unleashing a troll to eliminate all occupants of the manor, allowing him to purportedly rescue Holly Short. However, his plan goes awry when the troll is defeated by Domovoi Butler, and Cudgeon is inadvertently incapacitated by Root using a tranquilizer finger dart devised by Foaly. The sedative interacts with illegal brain-enhancing substances he had been experimenting with, resulting in disfigurement and demotion to lieutenant.

In "Artemis Fowl: The Arctic Incident," Cudgeon aligns with Opal Koboi to orchestrate a rebellion against the LEP and Root. Utilizing a goblin gang named the B'wa Kell, they launch an assault, which is thwarted by Artemis Fowl II, Butler, Holly Short, Root, and Foaly. Exposed by Foaly's revelation of his treachery, Cudgeon meets his demise when Koboi launches her Hoverboy at him in a fit of anger, causing him to fall into a plasma servicing hatch where he is fatally electrocuted. Throughout the events, he wields a customized Softnose Redboy blaster in an unsuccessful attempt to assassinate Koboi.

== D ==
=== Doodah Day ===
Doodah Day
- Artemis Fowl character
- First appearance: Book 5: Artemis Fowl: The Lost Colony
- Created by: Eoin Colfer

In-universe information
- Species: Pixie
- Gender: Male

Doodah Day is introduced in Artemis Fowl: The Lost Colony as a renowned pixie criminal specializing in fish smuggling. During an encounter with PI Holly Short, he nearly injures her with a multimixer, claiming later that his intention was merely to frighten her.

Known for his purported ability to drive any vehicle, Day possesses a device called the Mongocharger, which enhances a vehicle's power using a nuclear battery. Recognizing his valuable skills, the LEP offers him amnesty in exchange for his assistance. Day aids Artemis Fowl and Holly Short in rescuing No. 1 from Minerva.

Three years later, Doodah Day partners with Mulch Diggums in the private investigation firm, Short and Diggums, showcasing his continued involvement in the criminal underworld.

=== Mulch Diggums ===
Mulch Diggums
- Artemis Fowl character
- First appearance: Book 1: Artemis Fowl
- Last appearance: Book 8: Artemis Fowl: The Last Guardian
- Created by: Eoin Colfer

In-universe information
- Species: Dwarf
- Gender: Male

Mulch Diggums is introduced in Artemis Fowl as a highly skilled criminal who orchestrates his own fake death to escape from Fowl Manor. He deceives Foaly by using his iris cam on a rabbit, convincing the centaur that Mulch has perished in a cave-in. After his supposed demise, Mulch resurfaces to steal ransom gold retrieved by Holly Short.

In Artemis Fowl: The Arctic Incident, Mulch is discovered living luxuriously in California, earning the moniker "the Grouch" for his penchant for stealing Academy Awards. Despite his criminal inclinations, he aids Artemis and his allies in infiltrating Opal Koboi's lab before evading capture once again.

Subsequently, Mulch relocates to Chicago and becomes involved with the Antonelli crime family. Despite initially working as a mobster, he ultimately thwarts their plans targeting Artemis and his associates. Mulch's involvement in retrieving the C Cube, a fairy supercomputer, lands him in a fairy prison, where he receives a vital CD from Artemis before incarceration.

As a dwarf, Mulch possesses extraordinary abilities such as tunneling through dirt, rapid digestion, luminous saliva, and the capacity to absorb liquids through his pores. His talents make him a formidable criminal and later aid him in assisting the LEP. Despite his criminal tendencies, Mulch occasionally demonstrates loyalty to his allies and plays a pivotal role in various escapades throughout the series.

== F ==
=== Foaly ===
Foaly
- Artemis Fowl character
- First appearance: Book 1: Artemis Fowl
- Last appearance: Book 8: Artemis Fowl: The Last Guardian
- Created by: Eoin Colfer

In-universe information
- Species: Centaur
- Gender: Male

Foaly, a centaur LEP, makes his debut in Artemis Fowl as a character known for his sarcasm and paranoid tendencies. He firmly believes that human intelligence agencies are monitoring his transport and surveillance network, leading him to wear a tinfoil hat to prevent mind reading.

Due to his vital role in keeping fairy technology ahead of human advancements, Foaly cannot be dismissed from the LEP. His inventions prove instrumental in aiding his friends, such as Holly Short and Artemis, during perilous missions. Foaly's creations also play a role in capturing the notorious dwarf criminal, Mulch Diggums, despite their strained relationship.

Among Foaly's notable inventions are the dart finger used by Root to incapacitate Briar Cudgeon in the first book, the Iris Cam for covert surveillance, the Retimager for retina scanning, and the Titanium Pod, a magma-propelled vehicle. These innovations underscore Foaly's indispensable contributions to the fairy world's technological advancement and security.

=== Angeline Fowl ===
Angeline Fowl
- Artemis Fowl character
- First appearance: Book 1: Artemis Fowl
- Last appearance: Book 7: Artemis Fowl: The Atlantis Complex
- Created by: Eoin Colfer

In-universe information
- Species: Human
- Gender: Female

Angeline Fowl is introduced as the mother of Artemis Fowl II, described as attractive in her normal state. However, following the disappearance of her husband, Artemis Fowl I, she experiences psychological distress, displaying symptoms resembling schizophrenia and bipolar disorder. Angeline exhibits aversions to certain individuals, including Juliet Butler, as well as to being addressed as "Mother" by Artemis. She has hallucinations and delusions, often mistaking objects for her husband or reliving past events.

Throughout the series, Artemis struggles with his relationship with his mother. In "Artemis Fowl: The Opal Deception," he experiences guilt over deceiving her to obtain a painting. Angeline appears sporadically in the first four books, with her involvement increasing as the series progresses.

In "Artemis Fowl: The Time Paradox," Angeline falls ill with Spelltropy, prompting Artemis II to embark on a time-traveling quest for a cure. It is later revealed that she was manipulated by Opal Koboi, who sought the brain fluid of a lemur Artemis had inadvertently made extinct. Angeline learns about the existence of magical beings and demands answers from Artemis II.

In "Artemis Fowl: The Atlantis Complex," Angeline endeavors to foster a more normal teenage life for Artemis II, encouraging him to adopt casual attire and habits.

=== Artemis Fowl I ===
Artemis Fowl I, the father of Artemis Fowl II, is depicted as a wealthy Irishman with a reputation as a criminal mastermind. He disappears in Murmansk, Russia, before the events of the series, prompting a search that forms the central plot of Artemis Fowl: The Arctic Incident. Although mentioned throughout the series, Artemis Fowl I makes physical appearances only in the second book and in Artemis Fowl and the Time Paradox.

Upon his return, Artemis Fowl I expresses a desire to reconnect with his family, much to the frustration of his son, Artemis II, who is embroiled in various illegal schemes. In Artemis Fowl: The Eternity Code, insights from Artemis Fowl I's diary reveal a transformation in his outlook, as he no longer wishes to pursue a life of crime. He attempts to persuade his son to join him on a different path, questioning whether Artemis II will seize the opportunity to become a hero. This interaction serves as a catalyst for Artemis II's character development.

=== Artemis Fowl II ===
Artemis Fowl II is the central character and antihero of the series, renowned for his exceptional intellect and cunning. His discovery of the existence of fairies sets off a series of adventures that showcase his ingenuity and resourcefulness.

Fowl's remarkable abilities include fluency in various languages, including the official Fairy language "Gnommish", and extensive knowledge in psychology gleaned from numerous textbooks. He possesses an exceptionally high IQ, surpassing that of most psychiatrists in Europe, and demonstrates prowess in activities ranging from chess to art forgery.

Throughout the series, Artemis displays a penchant for orchestrating complex schemes and heists, such as stealing the painting "The Fairy Thief" and engaging in online chess tournaments. His encounters with fairies, including Holly Short, further demonstrate his adaptability and strategic thinking.

Artemis Fowl's character development is also evident in his physical experiences, such as the involuntary exchange of his left eye with Holly Short's during a transition between dimensions and the alteration of his left hand's fingers during time travel.

=== Beckett Fowl ===
Beckett Fowl, one of Angeline's twin sons, is introduced in Artemis Fowl: The Lost Colony. Born during Artemis's absence, Beckett is described as docile and is occasionally teased by his brother, Myles. He also appears in the series "The Fowl Twins".

=== Orion Fowl ===
Orion Fowl
- Artemis Fowl character
- First appearance: Book 7: Artemis Fowl: The Atlantis Complex
- Created by: Eoin Colfer

In-universe information
- Species: Human
- Gender: Male

Orion Fowl is introduced in Artemis Fowl: The Atlantis Complex as the alter ego of Artemis Fowl II, emerging while Artemis is afflicted with the titular condition. Triggered by a jolt of electricity administered by Holly Short, Orion emerges as a carefree and optimistic persona, in stark contrast to Artemis' calculated and strategic mindset. Despite lacking Artemis' intellect, Orion openly expresses his love for Holly Short.

During Orion's control of Artemis' body, Artemis remains aware of his surroundings but is unable to influence Orion's actions. Artemis explains that Orion serves as a manifestation of his guilt-free self, freed from the burdens of Artemis' morally dubious schemes. Although initially appearing as a hindrance, Orion eventually proves himself useful towards the end of the story. Utilizing the martial arts and marksmanship skills ingrained in Artemis' subconscious by Butler, Orion demonstrates his value by contributing to the resolution of the plot.

== K ==
=== Grub Kelp ===
Grub Kelp
- Artemis Fowl character
- First appearance: Book 1: Artemis Fowl
- Last appearance: Book 4: Artemis Fowl: The Opal Deception
- Created by: Eoin Colfer

In-universe information
- Species: Elf
- Gender: Male

Grub Kelp, an LEP corporal in the Artemis Fowl series, is depicted as the younger brother of Trouble Kelp. He exhibits a personality marked by fearfulness and sensitivity to insults, often expressing a desire for a desk job due to his aversion to danger. In Artemis Fowl: The Eternity Code, Grub is portrayed as someone who frequently complains about trivial matters, such as the discomfort caused by using Plexiglass vacuum cuffs.

Known for his inclination to involve his "Mommy" in matters that bother him, Grub is notorious for his attempts to use familial leverage to address his grievances, particularly regarding his brother Trouble. Despite his timid demeanor, Grub humorously claims to have single-handedly defeated Domovoi Butler, a renowned figure among fairies, although this boast is revealed to be unfounded in light of the events in Artemis Fowl.

Grub Kelp's character adds comedic elements to the series through his exaggerated fears and exaggerated stories, offering a contrast to the more serious and capable characters like Trouble and Holly Short.

=== Trouble Kelp ===
Trouble Kelp
- Artemis Fowl character
- First appearance: Book 1: Artemis Fowl
- Last appearance: Book 8: Artemis Fowl: The Last Guardian
- Created by: Eoin Colfer

In-universe information
- Species: Elf
- Gender: Male

Trouble Kelp, initially introduced as an LEPrecon captain in the Artemis Fowl series, grapples with the persistent pestering of his younger brother, Grub. Despite the challenges posed by Grub's antics, Trouble remains committed to caring for his sibling and prioritizes the well-being of Grub and his other subordinates above his own. Renowned as one of the most distinguished officers in the LEP, Trouble's dedication and selflessness earn him numerous accolades throughout his career.

In Artemis Fowl: The Eternity Code, Trouble's close friendship with Holly Short is unveiled, and subsequent events hint at a potential romantic interest between them, culminating in a date mentioned in Artemis Fowl: The Atlantis Complex. Throughout the series, Trouble's character undergoes development, eventually ascending to the position of commander during Holly's absence in Artemis Fowl: The Lost Colony.

In Artemis Fowl: The Last Guardian, Trouble's romantic life takes a new turn as he embarks on a relationship with Lily Frond, a member of the LEP whom Holly Short perceives as lacking in depth. Despite initial misgivings, Trouble's connection with Lily demonstrates his capacity to see beyond surface impressions and find genuine companionship.

=== Madame Ko ===
Madame Ko is a Japanese martial artist who serves as the leader of the academy where Domovoi and Juliet honed their skills. Under her guidance, they mastered various martial arts techniques, with Madame Ko awarding them the prestigious blue diamond tattoo as a symbol of their accomplishment.

=== Opal Koboi ===
Opal Koboi is a narcissistic pixie genius and the primary antagonist of the series. Using her unparalleled intelligence, she engages in criminal activities, as seen in Artemis Fowl: The Opal Deception. Foaly often harbors jealousy toward her inventive ideas and inventions. Koboi's rise to power involves putting her father out of business to establish her own company, Koboi Laboratories, where she amasses her fortune.

Her schemes include attempting to foment a war between humans and fairies by undergoing surgery to become more human-like. However, the surgery results in a gradual reduction of her magical abilities due to the replacement of her pituitary gland. Eventually, she resorts to using the last of her magic to mesmerize an Italian woman into believing Koboi is her daughter.

Throughout the series, Koboi proves to be a formidable foe, responsible for the deaths of Commander Root and General Scalene. She repeatedly targets Holly Short, Artemis, and Butler, coming perilously close to achieving her goals. In the 2020 film adaptation, Opal Koboi is voiced by Hong Chau in an uncredited capacity, with Koboi herself portrayed physically in a deleted scene where her character is merged with the water sprite of Ho Chi Minh City.

=== Billy Kong ===
Billy Kong (born Jonah Lee)
- Artemis Fowl character
- First appearance: Book 5: Artemis Fowl and the Lost Colony
- Created by: Eoin Colfer

In-universe information
- Species: Human
- Gender: Male

Billy Kong, also known as Jonah Lee, is a character introduced in Artemis Fowl: The Lost Colony and serves as one of the main antagonists alongside Leon Abbot.

Originally from Taiwan, Kong resides in Malibu, California, with his family. Described as having colorful, spiked hair, he has a troubled past, allegedly having killed a friend with a kitchen knife.

In the early 1980s, under his birth name Jonah Lee, he lives with his mother and brother Eric. After Eric's death, Jonah believes his brother's story about being attacked by demons, which later leads him to encounter fairies.

As Billy Kong, he becomes involved in Minerva Paradizo's plan to capture demons. However, his violent tendencies lead him to endanger not only Minerva's plan but also the life of the captured demon, No. 1.

Ultimately, Billy Kong's criminal past catches up with him when Butler, disguised and accompanied by Minerva, turns him over to the police for an old murder in Taipei, where he is wanted under his birth name, Jonah Lee.

=== Dr. Damon Kronski ===
Damon Kronski is the leader of a cult known as the Extinctionists, advocating for the eradication of any species deemed unbeneficial to humanity. He organizes an annual conference where Extinctionists capture the last member of a species, assess its usefulness to humanity, and if deemed irrelevant, destroy it. At the age of 10, Artemis Fowl sells him the last silky sifaka lemur, mistakenly believing it holds the cure for a magical disease that would afflict Artemis' mother in the future.

Following the loss of the lemur, Kronski captures Holly Short, intending to use her as the main attraction at his next conference. However, Kronski's influence wanes after an older Artemis from the future exposes Short as a young human girl rather than a new species. His downfall is further solidified when an embarrassing video of him being attacked by a koala resurfaces online.

It is eventually revealed that Kronski was mesmerized by Opal Koboi into helping capture the silky sifaka lemur, which possessed magical time-manipulating properties. Kronski ends up in a catatonic state, but Short uses her remaining magic to cure his anosmia, allowing him to experience his first smell from nearby vats of liquid pigeon droppings.

== L ==
=== Loafers McGuire ===
Loafers McGuire
- Artemis Fowl character
- First appearance: Book 3: Artemis Fowl: The Eternity Code
- Created by: Eoin Colfer

In-universe information
- Species: Human
- Gender: Male

Loafers is a character in the Artemis Fowl series, known as a hitman from Chicago. He is assigned to capture Artemis Fowl on behalf of the Antonelli crime family, under the employment of Jon Spiro. Loafers' real name is Aloysius McGuire, and he was born in Kilkenny, Ireland. He adopts the name "Loafers" because he believes it sounds more fitting for a Mafia persona than "Aloysius."

McGuire is notable for his extensive tattoos, each representing a completed job. Standing at five feet tall, his frame is entirely covered in these tattoos. He also carries a notebook of witticisms he has made, a unique trait he shares with Artemis Fowl, who once considered compiling his own collection of clever remarks after being struck by Holly Short in the first book.

Loafers is recruited alongside Mo Digence, an alias used by Mulch Diggums. During the mission to capture Artemis, Diggums betrays Loafers, aligning himself with Artemis instead. Despite Loafers' efforts to control the situation, he is quickly overpowered by Juliet Butler. Following his capture, Loafers undergoes a mind-wipe procedure. His tattoos are removed, and he is relocated to Kenya, where he assumes a new identity as Nuru.

== N ==
=== No. 1 ===
No. 1
- Artemis Fowl character
- First appearance: Book 5: Artemis Fowl and the Lost Colony
- Last appearance: Book 8: Artemis Fowl: The Last Guardian
- Created by: Eoin Colfer

In-universe information
- Species: Demon (Warlock)
- Gender: Male

No. 1 is an apprentice warlock (imp) and a recurring character in the Artemis Fowl series, first appearing as a main character in Artemis Fowl and the Lost Colony. He continues to feature prominently in every subsequent book.

No. 1 is distinctive even among warlocks. He rejects many demon traditions, such as the eagerness to warp and the discrimination against imps. He experiences nightmares about the spirits of animals he has eaten pleading with him. His magical abilities first manifest accidentally during a confrontation with Leon Abbot, the head of the demons, when he turns a wooden poker into stone, penetrating Abbot's armour. Abbot attempts to kill him by mesmerising him to jump into a volcano on Hybras, but this action sends No. 1 to Earth instead of killing him.

Minerva Paradizo later kidnaps No. 1. During his captivity, he develops the gift of tongues, fluently speaking Taiwanese during a heated exchange with Billy Kong. He is eventually rescued by Artemis Fowl and his allies and plays a crucial role in saving both Minerva and Hybras. No. 1 uses his "gargoyle's touch" to free Qwan and participates in the magical circle that brings Hybras back to Earth. He also facilitates Qweffor's complete control over Leon Abbot's body.

Despite his intelligence, No. 1 exhibits a childish demeanor and naivety. He often states the obvious and explains irrelevant details, displaying little self-confidence or pride for much of The Lost Colony However, he shows newfound strength by standing up to Abbot at the end of the book.

Qwan, No. 1's mentor, regards him as potentially the most powerful warlock ever, predicting that No. 1 could move Hybras alone in ten years. No. 1 often uses over-romanticized language learned from a medieval book Abbot brought to Hybras and releases stress through a barrage of synonyms when agitated. He also harbors a soft spot for a demoness with red markings similar to his own, whom he believes might be his mother.

In Time Paradox, No. 1 plays a major role in sending Artemis Fowl II and Holly Short back in time and anchoring them for their return with the lemur. In Atlantis Complex, Turnball Root tries to coerce No. 1 into keeping his dying human wife young forever. No. 1 makes a brief cameo appearance in The Last Guardian, seen in a flashback.

== P ==
=== Minerva Paradizo ===
Minerva Paradizo is a character introduced in Artemis Fowl and the Lost Colony, where she appears as a 12-year-old prodigy. Initially serving as an antagonist, Minerva captures the imp No.1, intending to present him as her project for the Nobel Prize in Stockholm. She is depicted as a mirror image of Artemis Fowl, equally intelligent and ambitious. Despite her formidable intellect and criminal genius, Artemis ultimately outsmarts her due to his alliance with the technologically superior fairies and his understanding of her personality weaknesses, which mirror his own past vulnerabilities.

Minerva's initial opposition to Artemis transitions to an alliance after she is betrayed by Kong and foiled by Artemis and his friends. This shift marks her as a complex character capable of growth and change. By the end of the book, Minerva is noted to have become quite attractive, with Domovoi Butler observing that she has developed feelings for Artemis. Although she does not appear in the subsequent books in the "Artemis Fowl" series, Minerva makes a brief return in The Fowl Twins: Get What They Deserve. In this scene, it is revealed that she and Artemis were once romantically involved but did not part on good terms.

=== Gaspard Paradizo ===
Gaspard Paradizo is the father of Minerva Paradizo. He briefly appears in Artemis Fowl and The Lost Colony. Following his successful reclamation of Holly Short and No. 1, he attempts to calm Minerva down after the great siege on Chateau Paradizo, but is knocked out when Billy Kong strikes him with a knife. Gaspard Paradizo is not mentioned in any of the other Artemis Fowl books.

== Q ==
=== Qwan ===
Qwan
- Artemis Fowl character
- First appearance: Book 5: Artemis Fowl and the Lost Colony Book 6: (mentioned)
- Created by: Eoin Colfer

In-universe information
- Species: Demon (Warlock)
- Gender: Male

Qwan, the last remaining member of the original ring of warlocks, plays a crucial role in the "Artemis Fowl" series, particularly in "Artemis Fowl and the Lost Colony." He serves as the mentor to Qweffor and No.1, and his expertise and leadership are instrumental in their development as warlocks. Qwan, along with the other warlocks, becomes imprisoned in stone during an attempt to move the demon island of Hybras into Limbo.

Centuries later, Qwan and the petrified warlocks are discovered by humans, who mistake them for statues and transport them to Taipei 101 as part of an exhibit. It is here that No.1, another warlock, finds and frees Qwan. Upon attempting to liberate the other warlocks, No.1 learns from Qwan that they have all perished during their petrification.

Despite being over 10,000 years old, Qwan maintains a spritely sense of humor, akin to that of characters like Foaly and Holly. This lively demeanor is partly due to his ability to hear people while he was petrified in the exhibit. As a master warlock, Qwan guides Artemis, Holly, No.1, and Qweffor in their mission to save Hybras. He leads the warlocks in performing the spell that eventually lifts Hybras out of time, demonstrating his unparalleled skill and leadership.

=== Qweffor ===
Qweffor
- Artemis Fowl character
- First appearance: Book 5: Artemis Fowl and the Lost Colony
- Created by: Eoin Colfer

In-universe information
- Species: Demon (Warlock)
- Gender: Male

Qweffor, a warlock apprentice, plays a significant role in "Artemis Fowl and the Lost Colony." Initially, he is under the tutelage of Qwan, a powerful warlock. During a critical moment when the warlocks attempt to lift the demon island of Hybras out of time, Qweffor's body is pushed into lava by Leon Abbot, causing their bodies to merge. Despite this traumatic event, Qweffor temporarily gains control over Abbot's body and assists in saving Hybras.

No. 1, another warlock, eventually allows Qweffor to permanently control Abbot's body, which pleases Qweffor as he admires Abbot's physique and genetic advantages. However, this control is initially incomplete, resulting in Qweffor experiencing uncontrollable twitches, shakes, and loss of bowel function, a condition humorously referred to as "Abbot's revenge." This condition persists until Abbot's consciousness is transferred into a guinea pig, resolving the issues for Qweffor.

Qweffor's father is Quillius the Great, adding to his notable lineage within the demon warlock community.

Julius Root
- Artemis Fowl character
- First appearance: Book 1 Artemis Fowl
- Last appearance: Book 6 Artemis Fowl: The Time Paradox
- Created by: Eoin Colfer

In-universe information
- Species: Elf
- Gender: Male; Female (film)

== R ==
=== Julius Root ===
Commander Julius Root, often nicknamed "Beetroot" due to his frequently purple facial complexion, was the commander of the LEPrecon (Lower Elements Police Reconnaissance) during the time Artemis Fowl first discovered the fairy world. Before his promotion to Major, Root was the most successful field operative in LEPrecon history, with numerous exploits involving the criminal dwarf Mulch Diggums. Root arrested Mulch on eight occasions, one of which nearly resulted in Mulch beheading him with a diamond cutter. Mulch was ultimately caught after a successful break-in and robbery of Koboi Labs when he attempted to sell an experimental alchemy vat to one of Root's informants. This led to Mulch becoming overly familiar with Root, often addressing him by his first name, Julius, to annoy him.

Commander Root was known for his fearsome temper, but he was also universally recognized as the best LEP commander of modern times. His reputation stemmed from his extensive experience, his willingness to get personally involved in missions, and his innovative thinking, such as his idea to recruit Mulch Diggums for the Fowl Manor siege. Root had absolute faith in the abilities of his trusted officers and was determined to see them succeed. Although Captain Holly Short initially believed Root disliked her because she was the first female officer in recon, he actually had a strong belief in her abilities and was committed to helping her realize her potential. Their relationship grew into a close bond, with some officers likening it to a father-daughter relationship.

Root's support for Holly was unwavering. He threatened to resign when her career was jeopardized after the Artemis Fowl incident and was responsible for recommending her for the position of Major. Tragically, Root was killed in "Artemis Fowl: The Opal Deception" by a trick orchestrated by Opal Koboi before he could see Holly's promotion through.

=== Turnball Root ===
Turnball Root
- Artemis Fowl character
- First appearance: First short story in The Artemis Fowl Files called LEPrecon
- Last appearance: Book 7 Artemis Fowl: The Atlantis Complex
- Created by: Eoin Colfer

In-universe information
- Species: Elf
- Gender: Male

Turnball Root is the elder brother of Julius Root and a central antagonist in the Artemis Fowl series. His first appearance is in a short story included in an exclusive edition of "The Time Paradox," and he later becomes the primary antagonist in "Artemis Fowl: The Atlantis Complex." Turnball Root kills Commander Vinyáya, escapes from jail, and attempts to kidnap No.1 to grant his human wife, Leonor, eternal life. His mission ultimately fails, and he and Leonor die while piloting an ambulance rigged with a bomb into a deep sea trench.

Turnball Root's known accomplices include Unix the sprite, Bobb Ragby the dwarf, Ching Mayle the goblin, and his human wife, Leonor. He uses thrall runes to enslave Leonor, Vishby (his jail guard whom he later kills), Captain Holly Short, and Artemis Fowl II. Artemis manages to escape the runes' power by provoking Ragby into electrocuting him, which leads to Orion, his alternate personality free of the runes' control, becoming dominant. Captain Short, however, remains under the runes' influence and knocks out Juliet Butler, forcing Orion Fowl to shoot her with Turnball's chemical gun.

Turnball Root's backstory reveals that he was previously a captain in LEPrecon but was forced to quit after attempting to flood a section of Haven City to eliminate a competitor in his illegal mining operation. Julius Root stopped him just in time, forcing Turnball to flee to the surface, where he spent over five centuries on the run, maintaining 96 residences, including a villa near Nice, France. After this incident, Turnball gained his own page in LEPrecon's Criminally Insane section.

In LEPrecon, Turnball Root lures Julius into a trap while testing Holly Short in the Tern Islands, aiming to end Julius' relentless pursuit. Along with his cronies Bobb Ragby and Unix B'Lob, he traps Holly and Trouble Kelp inside a human residence on the island, intending for Julius to "tag" Holly and cause her to fail her test. However, Holly manages to warn Julius, leading to Turnball's capture. After his capture, Turnball attempts suicide by swallowing a Tunnel Blue spider, which would tear him apart from the inside. Julius saves him by forcing coffee down his throat, killing the spider.

Turnball Root meets his end in "Artemis Fowl: The Atlantis Complex."

== S ==
=== General Scalene ===
General Scalene
- Artemis Fowl character
- First appearance: Book 2: Artemis Fowl: The Arctic Incident
- Last appearance: Book 4: Artemis Fowl: The Opal Deception
- Created by: Eoin Colfer

In-universe information
- Species: Goblin
- Gender: Male

General Scalene is a significant character in the Artemis Fowl series, serving as one of the commanding figures in the B'wa Kell, a notorious goblin criminal organization involved in illegal smuggling activities. Scalene is first introduced in Artemis Fowl: The Arctic Incident, where he is flattered by Opal Koboi and Briar Cudgeon with the exaggerated title of "general." Under Koboi's manipulation, Scalene and his gang are drawn into a plot to seize control of Haven City. They smuggle human-manufactured batteries into the Lower Elements to power their softnose lasers, which are used in an assault on the city. Following the rebellion's failure, Scalene is imprisoned at Howler's Peak Goblin Correctional Facility.

In "Artemis Fowl: The Opal Deception," Scalene plays a minor yet crucial role. He is visited in prison by Boohn, one of his numerous nephews, who disguises him using his own shed skin, facilitating Scalene's escape from Howler's Peak. However, Scalene's freedom is short-lived as he falls under the mesmerization of a deranged Opal Koboi. Koboi straps Scalene to a bomb and uses him as bait to lure her adversaries, Julius Root and Holly Short. The trap results in the bomb's detonation, killing both Scalene and Root instantly, while Short narrowly escapes.

=== Gola Schweem ===
Gola Schweem
- Artemis Fowl character
- First appearance: Book 4: Artemis Fowl: The Opal Deception (mentioned)
- Created by: Eoin Colfer

In-universe information
- Species: Unknown
- Gender: Female

Gola Schweem appears in Artemis Fowl: The Opal Deception. Schweem indirectly teaches Opal Koboi to descend into a self-induced coma. Koboi first successfully accomplishes this feat at the age of 14. Koboi uses this knowledge to become catatonic for 11 months while planning the destruction of her enemies.

=== Holly Short ===
Holly Short
- Artemis Fowl character
- First appearance: Artemis Fowl
- Last appearance: Artemis Fowl: The Last Guardian
- Created by: Eoin Colfer

In-universe information
- Species: Elf
- Gender: Female

Captain Holly Short is a prominent female elf in the Artemis Fowl series, serving as a LEPrecon officer in the Lower Elements Police reconnaissance division. Standing at exactly 3 feet tall, Holly's diminutive stature is considered advantageous for fairies. She is known for her talkative and sarcastic demeanor, with distinctive auburn crew-cut hair, hazel eyes, pointed ears, and nut-brown skin typical of her species. By the events of Artemis Fowl: The Arctic Incident, Holly is approximately 80 years old. Notably, she is the first and only female officer in the LEPrecon.

Holly's relationship with Artemis Fowl evolves significantly over the course of the series. Initially, their interactions are marked by hostility and distrust. However, as the series progresses, this dynamic transforms into one of mutual respect and friendship, with hints of a deeper emotional connection emerging by the sixth book.

=== Ark Sool ===
Ark Sool
- Artemis Fowl character
- First appearance: Book 4: Artemis Fowl: The Opal Deception
- Last appearance: Book 7: Artemis Fowl: The Atlantis Complex
- Created by: Eoin Colfer

In-universe information
- Species: Gnome
- Gender: Male

Commander Ark Sool emerges in Artemis Fowl: The Opal Deception as the highest-ranking gnome within the Lower Elements Police Internal Affairs department. Characterized by his atypical stature and lack of affinity for customary gnome, adornments, Sool is portrayed as an uncompromising enforcer of regulations, earning him the moniker "king of red-tape" from Holly. His rigid adherence to protocol often brings him into conflict with Foaly, the centaur who serves as the fairies' chief technical advisor.

Throughout the narrative, Sool exhibits a narrow-minded focus on implicating Holly Short as the sole suspect in Commander Julius Root's murder, disregarding alternative possibilities and manipulating evidence to fit his preconceived notions. Despite Short's eventual exoneration, Sool remains vigilant, vowing to monitor her closely for any transgressions. His subsequent promotion to LEPrecon commander prompts Short's resignation, while also leading to Foaly's temporary departure from the LEP in Artemis Fowl and the Lost Colony.

Sool's leadership decisions, including a lockdown of forces during a demon abduction crisis, result in Holly being left without fairy support in the field. However, his tenure is marred by controversy when it is revealed that he harbors intentions to allow the extinction of the eighth fairy family, the demons. This revelation leads to his ousting from his position as head of the LEP, with Trouble Kelp assuming his role.

In Artemis Fowl: The Atlantis Complex, Sool aligns himself with Captain Turnball Root, serving as one of Root's henchmen until Root's escape from prison.

=== Jon Spiro ===
Jon Spiro
- Artemis Fowl character
- First appearance: Book 3: Artemis Fowl: The Eternity Code
- Created by: Eoin Colfer

In-universe information
- Species: Human
- Gender: Male

Jon Spiro, the primary antagonist in Artemis Fowl: The Eternity Code is portrayed as a wealthy and unscrupulous Chicagoan, owning the communications company Fission Chips. Suspected of achieving success through illicit means, Spiro's connections to organized crime remain unsubstantiated. His character is depicted as power-hungry and megalomaniacal, exemplified by extravagant displays of authority such as retrieving the ballroom doors of the sunken Titanic to serve as his office entrance at the Spiro Needle, Fission Chips' headquarters.

Described as a thin, middle-aged American, and only a little taller than Fowl, with a penchant for white linen suits and ostentatious gold jewelry, Spiro exhibits signs of health issues possibly related to stress, such as gut problems. During a pivotal meeting with Artemis Fowl at a renowned London seafood restaurant, En Fin, to discuss the C Cube invention, Spiro orchestrates a scheme to outwit Fowl, employing assassins to steal the device. Ultimately, Fowl engineers Spiro's downfall, leading to his arrest by a SWAT team after an attempted assassination.

== V ==
=== Chix Verbil ===
Chix Verbil
- Artemis Fowl character
- First appearance: Book 1: Artemis Fowl
- Last appearance: Book 7: Artemis Fowl: Atlantis Complex
- Created by: Eoin Colfer

In-universe information
- Species: Sprite
- Gender: Male

Private Chix Verbil, an amorous sprite with wings and green skin, is introduced in the later part of the first book of the Artemis Fowl series. Verbil, like all sprites, has wings, green skin, and loves to fly.

Initially, Verbil's role is minimal, tasked with blowing up a door to free a captured troll and guarding ransom money, which he neglects to do

In Artemis Fowl: The Arctic Incident, Verbil's character is further developed. He displays romantic aspirations towards Captain Holly Short attempting to flirt with her during a surveillance shift. While doing a routine flyby and thermal scan, two grey moving objects are detected. Immediately, Captain Short communications with Foaly, who admits that someone may have defeated his system, because when the thermal scan finds a grey zone it means that there are no living organisms. Short quickly commands Verbil to fly up to the surveillance pod, but he is too busy attempting to flirt with his attractive captain to pay much attention. At that moment, a laser fired by the B'wa Kell goblin gang punctures a hole through his wing. Short intervenes to save Verbil's life, healing his wound but rendering him unable to fly long distances again. Grateful for her assistance, Verbil pledges a debt to Short.

In the Artemis Fowl: The Opal Deception, Verbil has been promoted to captain. He assists in interviewing Mulch Diggums, akleptomaniac dwarf, who provides crucial information about the escape of Opal Koboi. Despite initial reluctance, Verbil allows Diggums to knock him out and steal a shuttle to aid Short (fulfilling his debt to Short, as Diggums was doing it to help her). Later, Verbil relays Diggums' message to Foaly, who checks on Koboi's status, leading to the discovery of Koboi's clone and prompting further action by Commander Ark Sool.

In Artemis Fowl: Atlantis Complex, he receives a message from Short about the space probe heading for Atlantis. However, he hesitates to inform Commander Kelp immediately, suspecting it may be a prank message.

=== Raine Vinyáya ===
Wing Commander Raine Vinyáya
- Artemis Fowl character
- First appearance: Book 1: Artemis Fowl
- Last appearance: Book 7: Artemis Fowl: The Atlantis Complex
- Created by: Eoin Colfer

In-universe information
- Species: Elf
- Gender: Female

Wing Commander Raine Vinyáya, an elf, holds a pivotal role within the fairy council and serves as the chairwoman of Section Eight, a clandestine organization.

While she is briefly mentioned in earlier books and notably absent from Artemis Fowl: The Eternity Code, Vinyáya emerges prominently in Artemis Fowl and the Lost Colony, in this installment, she recruits Holly Short into Section Eight having previously instructed Short in flying courses during her time at the LEP Academy. Notably, Vinyáya humorously remarks in Short's report about her piloting skills, stating that "she could pilot a shuttle pod through the gap between your teeth," a combination of compliment and jest referencing Short's crash landing incident.

By Artemis Fowl: The Lost Colony, Vinyáya discontinues dyeing her hair, revealing her natural silver color. Further, in Artemis Fowl: The Arctic Incident, she displays her prowess as a skilled marksman, opting for an electric rifle in the battle against goblins, earning commendation from Trouble Kelp for her precision.

In Artemis Fowl: The Atlantis Complex, Commander Vinyáya is killed by a space probe commandeered by Turnball Root. It is revealed she has a brother called Tarpon Vinyáya, serving as the warden at the Atlantis prison, inadvertently enabling Turnball Root's escape.

Commander Vinyáya's first name is given as Raine in the first chapter of Artemis Fowl: The Atlantis Complex.

=== Vishby ===
Vishby, a water elf prison guard residing in Atlantis, is introduced in Artemis Fowl: The Opal Deception as he oversees Mulch Diggums confinement in a prison shuttle en route to the jails of Atlantis. Diggums frequently disparages him by dubbing him "fishboy," noting the resemblance in their names. Vishby's final appearance occurs in Artemis Fowl: The Atlantis Complex, where he becomes a thrall of the criminal Turnball Root. In this state, Vishby assists Root in procuring the necessary materials for his escape from jail. Vishby meets his demise when Root abandons him, leading to his demise as he is crushed by Root's space probe.

=== Mikhael Vassikin ===
Mikhael Vassikin
- Artemis Fowl character
- First appearance: Book 2: Artemis Fowl: The Arctic Incident
- Created by: Eoin Colfer

In-universe information
- Species: Human
- Gender: Male

Mikhael Vassikin (Russian: Михаил Васикин) serves as a member of the Russian Mafia. In Artemis Fowl: The Arctic Incident, he is one of two individuals tasked with guarding Artemis Fowl I

== Z ==
=== Giovanni Zito ===
Giovanni Zito
- Artemis Fowl character
- First appearance: Book 4: Artemis Fowl: The Opal Deception
- Last appearance: Artemis Fowl: The Lost Colony (mentioned)
- Created by: Eoin Colfer

In-universe information
- Species: Human
- Gender: Male

Giovanni Zito, a wealthy Italian environmentalist from Sicily. becomes involved in Opal Koboi's plans in Artemis Fowl: The Opal Deception, Koboi manipulates him into believing he is her adoptive parent, using his influence and resources to obtain advanced technology aimed at revealing the existence of fairies. Zito's association with Artemis Fowl suggests a friendship, as seen when he provides Artemis with passes for an opera in exchange for Bordeaux in Artemis Fowl and the Lost Colony, enabling Artemis to investigate a potential demon manifestation.

== See also ==
- Don Juan
