= Artemis Fowl (film) =

2020 film by Kenneth Branagh

- Official release poster
- Directed by: Kenneth Branagh
- Screenplay by: Conor McPherson; Hamish McColl
- Based on: Artemis Fowl by Eoin Colfer
- Produced by: Kenneth Branagh; Judy Hofflund
- Starring: Ferdia Shaw; Lara McDonnell; Josh Gad; Tamara Smart; Nonso Anozie; Colin Farrell; Judi Dench
- Cinematography: Haris Zambarloukos
- Edited by: Matthew Tucker
- Music by: Patrick Doyle
- Production company: Walt Disney Pictures
- Distributed by: Disney+
- Release date: June 12, 2020
- Running time: 93 minutes
- Country: United States
- Language: English
- Budget: $125 million

Artemis Fowl is a 2020 American science fantasy film based on the 2001 novel by Irish author Eoin Colfer. Directed by Kenneth Branagh, from a screenplay co-written by Conor McPherson and Hamish McColl, the film stars Ferdia Shaw, Lara McDonnell, Josh Gad, Tamara Smart, Nonso Anozie, Colin Farrell, and Judi Dench. It details the adventures of Artemis Fowl II, a twelve-year-old Irish prodigy who teams up with his faithful servant, as well as a dwarf and a fairy, to rescue his father, Artemis Fowl I, who has been kidnapped by another fairy looking to reclaim an item the Fowl family has stolen.

Originally intended to be launched as a franchise by Miramax in 2001, the film languished in development hell with several writers and directors attached until Walt Disney Pictures revived the project in 2013. Branagh was hired in 2015 and filming began in 2018.

Artemis Fowl's intended 2019 theatrical release was delayed to 2020, and then cancelled in response to the COVID-19 pandemic. Instead, it was released digitally worldwide exclusively on Disney+ on June 12, 2020. The film received negative reviews from critics, who criticized the film's plot, dialogue, characters, visual effects, and changes made to the source material.

In October 2026, an animated reboot series was announced for Disney+.

== Plot ==
On the coast of Ireland, a media frenzy descends on Fowl Manor, where a stolen collection of world-famous relics is linked to wealthy businessman, Artemis Fowl I. Arrested at the manor, Mulch Diggums is interrogated by British intelligence and claims that his employer has stolen the powerful "Aculos". Offering to prove the existence of magic, Diggums tells the story of Artemis Fowl Jr.

Three days earlier, Artemis Jr., a twelve-year-old genius, lives at Fowl Manor with his widowed father Artemis Sr., who goes missing from his boat, accused of the theft of several priceless artifacts found aboard. Artemis Jr. receives a call from a hooded figure. Holding his father captive, the hooded figure gives Artemis three days to recover the Aculos, which Artemis Sr. has stolen and hidden. Domovoi "Dom" Butler, Artemis' bodyguard, shows him a hidden library where generations of Fowls have catalogued proof of the existence of magical creatures.

Deep underground inside the Earth's core is the Haven City – home to a civilization of fairies – Mulch, an oversized dwarf thief, encounters Lower Elements Police reconnaissance (LEPrecon) officer Holly Short as he is taken to prison. Commander Julius Root dispatches the LEPrecon force to search for the Aculos, the fairies' greatest resource which makes anyone teleport through worlds across universe and biggest source of heat and light energy to the fairies. Foaly, LEPrecon's centaur technical advisor, discovers an unauthorized creature has reached the surface. Holly is sent to investigate, despite the fact that her father, Beechwood Short, stole the Aculos and was killed. In Martina Franca, Italy, Holly intervenes as a rogue troll attacks a human wedding party. Using a "time freeze", LEPrecon subdues the troll and wipes the humans' memories.

Dom's twelve-year-old niece Juliet arrives at the manor. From his father's journal, Artemis learns that Beechwood brought the Aculos to Artemis Sr. to keep it from the hooded figure, revealed to be Opal Koboi, a powerful fairy warlord and once a ruthless dictator of Haven City who is now planning to wipe out humankind and establish fairy rule upon all the worlds. Artemis sends Dom to stakeout the Hill of Tara. Holly, determined to clear her father's name, disobeys orders and flies to the Hill of Tara, where she finds Beechwood's ID tag, but is captured by Dom and imprisoned inside the manor.

Root and an army of LEPrecon officers seal Fowl Manor in a time freeze, but Artemis and Dom fight them off using Holly's equipment. Artemis demands the Aculos in exchange for Holly's release, forbidding fairies to enter his home while he is alive. Bound by fairy rules, Root retrieves Mulch from prison, offering him a reduced sentence to infiltrate Fowl Manor. Mulch tunnels inside and breaks into Artemis Sr.'s safe, finding the Aculos, while Artemis frees Holly and asks for her help. Lieutenant Briar Cudgeon, a spy for Koboi, seizes command of LEPrecon and releases the captured troll into the house, jamming all magic inside.

Mulch swallows the Aculos as Artemis, Holly, Juliet, and Dom evade the troll, which is later killed by Dom. After killing it, Dom is mortally wounded. Against orders, Holly's fellow officers unblock her magic, and she revives Dom. Mulch and the LEPrecon army escape as the time freeze collapses. Left with the Aculos, Artemis refuses to give it to Koboi, and Holly agrees to use it to rescue Artemis' father. As Koboi attempts to kill Artemis Sr., Holly summons him to Fowl Manor. Artemis Sr. tells Holly that her father gave his life to protect the Aculos, giving her a list of Koboi's accomplices. Holly returns the Aculos to Haven City, where Root, back in command, directs her to investigate every name on the list. Artemis calls Koboi and promises that after destroying her associates, he will come after her and restore the balance of the universe.

Mulch's interrogator offers him freedom in exchange for help capturing Artemis Sr., but Mulch reveals that Artemis arranged his arrest to prove the incident to the authorities, and confirms the existence of magic on camera. As the interrogator calls for backup, the Fowls' helicopter rescues Mulch and, joined by Holly, they fly off for their next mission to hunt down Koboi's associates.

== Cast ==
- Ferdia Shaw as Artemis Fowl II, a 12-year-old human criminal mastermind, with exceptionally high intelligence.
- Lara McDonnell as Holly Short, an 84-year-old elven reconnaissance officer of the Lower Elements Police (LEPrecon), whom Artemis kidnaps to hold to ransom.
- Josh Gad as Mulch Diggums, an imprisoned dwarfus giganticus gentleman thief who agrees to work for the LEP.
- Tamara Smart as Juliet Butler, Domovoi's 12-year-old niece and protégé, and Artemis' best friend.
- Nonso Anozie as Domovoi "Dom" Butler, Artemis' trusted servant and bodyguard, whose family has served the Fowls for generations.
- Joshua McGuire as Briar Cudgeon, a power-hungry lieutenant in the LEP.
- Colin Farrell as Artemis Fowl I, Artemis' absent father and criminal mastermind.
- Judi Dench as Commander Julius Root, Holly's 802-year-old commanding officer in the LEP.
- Nikesh Patel as Foaly, a centaur and the LEPrecon division's technical advisor.
- Adrian Scarborough as the Goblin Chief
- Chi-Lin Nim as Trouble Kelp, a captain of the LEP.
- Lewy Xing as Grub Kelp, a corporal of the LEP.
- Vincenzo Nicoli as the Goblin Sergeant
- Conor MacNeill as the Goblin Lieutenant
- Adam Basil and Taylor James as the Troll
- William Moseley as Italian Man
- Sally Messham as Sky Willow

In scenes that were filmed but not used, Miranda Raison portrayed Angeline Fowl, Artemis' deceased mother, and Laurence Kinlan portrayed Beachwood Short, Holly's deceased father and a former member of the LEP. Hong Chau appears as a fairy blackmailed by Artemis in a deleted scene.

== Production ==
=== Development ===
Miramax Films (owned by The Walt Disney Company at the time) purchased the film rights in conjunction with Tribeca Productions in 2000, before the novel was published. Plans for a film adaptation of the series were first announced in 2001, with Lawrence Guterman signed to direct, Jeff Stockwell to write, and Robert De Niro and Jane Rosenthal as producers. In 2003, series creator Eoin Colfer stated that a screenplay had been finalized and that casting was due to start the same year but expressed skepticism over whether or not this would come to pass. The film remained in development hell, in part because of disputes over the rights between The Walt Disney Company and Harvey and Bob Weinstein, who were leaving Miramax Films. During this time, Jim Sheridan, his daughter Naomi Sheridan, and Colfer co-wrote a non-commissioned screenplay, and it was reported in 2011 that Jim Sheridan was negotiating to direct and had met with Saoirse Ronan to possibly star in the film.

In July 2013, Walt Disney Pictures announced that they would produce an Artemis Fowl film with The Weinstein Company, covering the events of the first and second novels of the series, with the screenplay written by Michael Goldenberg.

On September 1, 2015, Variety reported that Kenneth Branagh had been hired to direct the film for Disney, with Irish playwright Conor McPherson as screenwriter and Harvey Weinstein, Judy Hofflund, and Branagh as producers. On September 12, 2017, Disney announced that the film adaptation would be released on August 9, 2019. The following month, Disney removed Weinstein as producer of the film and terminated its production partnership with The Weinstein Company following the exposure of Weinstein's criminal sexual misconduct.

=== Casting ===
On September 18, 2017, it was reported that Judi Dench was in talks for an undisclosed role. On December 20, 2017, it was announced that Irish newcomer and grandson of Robert Shaw, Ferdia Shaw, had been cast as Artemis Fowl II, alongside Dench as Commander Root, Josh Gad as Mulch Diggums, Lara McDonnell as Captain Holly Short, and Nonso Anozie as Butler. Colin Farrell was added to the cast as Artemis Fowl I during reshoots, and his involvement was revealed through the second trailer in March 2020.

McDonnell's casting as Short brought accusations of whitewashing, given the character in the book series is described as having dark nut-brown skin of a coffee complexion. Similarly, Anozie's casting as Butler was criticized, as the books describe him as a Eurasian who can pass as Japanese and Russian; and because the character's physical description of terrifying anyone in his presence, combined with his backstory of his family having served the Fowl family for centuries, was seen with Anozie's casting as embodying several stereotypes of African Americans and Africans, in particular the "scary black man" and "black servant" tropes.

Author Eoin Colfer filmed a cameo appearance as an extra. Describing his one scene, filmed in Northern Ireland, Colfer said, "I walked across a field with a lot of other people. It wasn't too taxing – although I did manage to get it wrong a few times. The only direction they gave was: 'Walk across the field and don't look at the camera.' I must have looked at the camera about 20 times. I have a new respect for actors."

=== Filming ===
Principal photography commenced on March 12, 2018. The film was shot in the Republic of Ireland, Northern Ireland, England, Scotland, Italy, and Vietnam. Fowl Manor was built at Longcross Studios in Surrey and was designed to last for the production of sequels, but had been torn down by May 2020. Many changes were made from the source material, which Colfer has stated that he supports.

== Release ==
The film was originally scheduled for a theatrical release on August 9, 2019, by Walt Disney Studios Motion Pictures. In May 2019, the film was pushed back to May 29, 2020. Later however, due to the impact of the COVID-19 pandemic on cinema, the film's theatrical release was cancelled and it was exclusively released on Disney+ on June 12, 2020. Vulture wrote that "given Disney's continuing commitment to theatrical openings for its megabudget event films... it's impossible to read Artemis Fowl's Disney+ debut as anything but an abandonment of faith." In November 2020, Variety reported the film was the 18th-most watched straight-to-streaming title of 2020 up to that point.

The film was removed from Disney+ on May 26, 2023 as part of a cost-cutting measure on Disney's streaming platforms. It was released on digital retail platforms on September 26, 2023.

== Reception ==
=== Audience viewership ===
According to ScreenEngine/ASI, Artemis Fowl was the 18th-most-watched straight-to-streaming title of 2020, as of November 2020.

=== Critical response ===
On Rotten Tomatoes, the film holds an approval rating of 8% based on 177 reviews, and an average rating of 3.7/10. The website's critics consensus reads, "A would-be franchise-starter that will anger fans of the source material and leave newcomers befuddled, Artemis Fowl is frustratingly flightless." On Metacritic, the film has a weighted average score of 31 out of 100 based on 33 critics, indicating "generally unfavorable" reviews.

Comic Book Resources summarized that critics were generally "blasting the film for not being entertaining enough and [for] poor execution." Kate Erbland of IndieWire gave the film a "D+" and noted that it "lacks an effective star, good effects, general coherency, and any sense of actual magic." David Rooney of The Hollywood Reporter wrote that the film "becomes a wearying slog, with too little reason to invest in the bland characters amid all the chaos." Peter Debruge of Variety called the film "tortuously long at just 93 minutes" and "downright awful". Scott Mendelssohn of Forbes wrote that the film "fails on a fundamental level of 'Is this movie fun?' and 'Do I want to spend any more time with these characters?'" and described it as "one of the worst YA fantasy movies ever". Robbie Collin of The Daily Telegraph gave the film 1/5 stars, writing: "Lots of things happen but nothing unfolds. It's like watching a feature-length trailer for a film that doesn't exist." Barry Hertz of The Globe and Mail gave the film 1.5/4 stars, saying that it was "a confusing, muddled, sloppy mess of bad intentions and worse execution." Peter Bradshaw of The Guardian gave the film 2/5 stars, writing: "Images and characters bounce around like shapes on a screensaver and only McDonnell and Gad's performances have any fizz. This is a YA-franchise by numbers."

Richard Roeper of the Chicago Sun-Times gave a positive review of 3 out of 4 stars, writing that the film "does a marvelous job of capturing the decidedly Irish tone of the adventure" and features a "wonderful and diverse collection of characters." Mark Kermode said that it was: "A fun, fleeting, rather flimsy romp... it doesn't have classic qualities, but it works if you take it for what it is: a 95-minute supernatural fantasy". Brian Lowry of CNN wrote: "Artemis Fowl isn't an unqualified good egg, but it's perfectly adequate... Adapted from popular books, this busy, hectic film races to build an ornate world, and winds up feeling like it's jumping to "franchise" status before getting on its cinematic feet."

Steve Rose of The Guardian criticized the film's "color-blind" casting. He said that the casting of Butler, who was Eurasian in the books, was "not a great look casting the guy whose family has served the white Fowl dynasty for generations as a black man", and also criticized Holly Short being played by a white actress in the film despite being described as "nut brown" in the books.

=== Accolades ===
Ferdia Shaw received a nomination for Best Performance in a Streaming Film – Teen Actor at the 2021 Young Artist Awards. Collider included Artemis Fowl in their "Best Original Movies on Disney Plus" list.
