= Artemis Fowl (novel) =

First book in the Artemis Fowl series, 2001

- First edition cover
- Author: Eoin Colfer
- Audio read by: Adrian Dunbar
- Language: English
- Series: Artemis Fowl
- Genre: Young adult, fantasy
- Publisher: Viking Press
- Publication date: 26 April 2001
- Publication place: Ireland
- Media type: Print (hardback & paperback), Audiobook CD
- Pages: 280
- ISBN: 0-670-89962-3
- OCLC: 46493219
- Dewey Decimal: 813
- Followed by: The Arctic Incident (2002)

Artemis Fowl is a young adult fantasy novel written by Irish author Eoin Colfer. It is the first book in the Artemis Fowl series, followed by Artemis Fowl and the Arctic Incident. Pitched by its author as "Die Hard with fairies", the novel follows fairy LEP reconnaissance officer Holly Short (based on John McClane and Holly Gennero McClane) after she is kidnapped by twelve-year-old criminal mastermind Artemis Fowl II (based on Hans Gruber) for a large ransom of gold.

Throughout the book, the third-person narration switches from following the human characters to following the fairy characters to present underlying themes of greed and conflict. The book received a mostly favourable critical response and several awards. A film adaptation titled Artemis Fowl was released in the United Kingdom on 12 June 2020 and in the United States on 10 September 2021, by Walt Disney Pictures.

== Synopsis ==
Captain Holly Short, an elf in the Lower Elements Police (LEP), is tracking a rogue troll that has managed to reach the surface of the Earth from Haven City, thousands of feet underground. Assisted by the technically minded centaur Foaly and LEPrecon commander Julius Root, she incapacitates the troll. However, Commander Root finds out that Holly is low on magic, so Holly leaves for Tara to replenish her magic.

Meanwhile, Artemis Fowl II is a 12-year-old prodigy who has dedicated his life to criminal activities. He leads the Fowl criminal empire, which has existed in his family for generations. After significant research, Artemis believes that he has confirmed the existence of fairies. He identifies an alcoholic sprite living in Ho Chi Minh City, Vietnam, and travels there with his bodyguard Butler to obtain from her The Book of the People—the fairy holy book that is written in Gnommish. After decoding the book using translating software, Artemis learns the specifics of the ritual fairies use to replenish their magic: take an acorn from an ancient oak tree near a bend in a river under the full moon and plant it elsewhere. Artemis and Butler track down 129 possible nearby locations for the ritual and start a stakeout. They discover Holly performing the ritual, and Butler tranquillises her with a hypodermic dart gun.

After being led onto Fowl's ship by Holly's tracker, Artemis tells Commander Root his name so they can find him, and then blows the ship up. An LEP retrieval team is sent to scout Fowl Manor using their 'shielding' ability, which allows them to vibrate faster than the human eye can follow. The team enters the manor grounds, where Artemis has installed a camera with a high frames-per-second rate, allowing him to detect the threat. After Butler incapacitates the intruders, Root decides to lay siege to Fowl Manor using a time-stop and enter negotiations. Artemis states his ransom demand: one ton of 24-carat gold. Artemis also reveals his knowledge of the time-stop and claims that he can escape it. An analysis by LEP behaviour experts determines that Artemis believes he is telling the truth.

The attempts to gain entry to the manor continue as the LEP recruits an infamous criminal, the kleptomaniac dwarf Mulch Diggums, to break in. Fairies normally cannot enter human dwellings without permission, but Mulch has forfeited the magic preventing him from entering dwellings, causing him to be safe when burglarising. He tunnels underground to reach the house while Foaly feeds a loop to the manor surveillance system, allowing Mulch to freely explore. Mulch accidentally locates a safe containing Artemis' copy of the book, revealing to the fairies the source of Artemis' knowledge, which he had led them to believe he had acquired from a truth serum administered to Holly. The Fairy Council, deciding that nothing is working, promotes a lieutenant called Briar Cudgeon to acting commander, temporarily usurping Julius Root. Meanwhile, Holly cracks through the concrete of her cell, finding fresh dirt, and completes the ritual with a smuggled acorn. Having regained her magic, she escapes into the main house.

Cudgeon decides to release the troll Holly captured earlier, into the mansion, to force Artemis to allow the fairies to enter and subdue the troll. This backfires, as Butler, aided by Holly's healing powers, defeats the troll. The Fairy Council subsequently strips Cudgeon of his post.

Artemis is finally granted the ransom. The gold is sent in and Artemis asks Holly for a wish: to cure his mother's insanity—she has been living in her bedroom, driven mad by the loss of her husband. Holly grants the wish at the cost of half the gold. The LEP decides to send in a "blue rinse"—a biological bomb that kills all organic life—to eliminate Artemis and allow for the retrieval of the gold, but this fails when Artemis escapes the time-stop by drugging himself and his comrades with sleeping pills.

As Artemis has survived until the end of the time-stop, the LEP is bound by law to leave the remaining gold and depart. In the end, Butler demands an explanation as to how Artemis came up with the idea of using sleeping pills. Artemis explains that he had gotten the idea from old fairy tales, in which human characters never wake up at an inopportune moment for the fairies and had guessed that time-stops were the reason. Concluding that the time-stop forces a being to stay in whichever state of consciousness they were in when the time-stop is started, Artemis uses sleeping pills to break out of the time-stop. Artemis finds his mother has fully recovered from her insanity thanks to Holly's magic.

== Themes ==
Artemis Fowl has a number of underlying themes, but the most essential of these are greed and the conflict between good and evil.

Greed is the first main theme that is introduced into the book, and specifically the desire to obtain gold. In a similar manner to other themes in the book, it changes throughout, becoming less of a focus near to the end of the novel, where Artemis is (grudgingly) willing to part with a large sum of money to help someone else.

The idea of conflict between good and evil is one that is touched upon in the book in a light-hearted manner. Although Artemis sees himself as an evil genius at the beginning of the book, and is portrayed as such, the end of the story contradicts this image when he pays the fairy Holly to help his mother. Artemis's enemies, the fairies, would be "the good side", but their actions call this view into question—they are as determined as Artemis is to achieve their goals. While only some of them are willing to ruthlessly deploy a troll, regardless of the possible danger to life, all are willing to utilise a bio-bomb once Holly is out of the mansion, to eliminate Artemis.

== Critical reception ==
In general, the book received a very positive critical response—in 2004 it received the Young Reader's Choice Award and Garden State Teen Book Award, among other awards.

The New York Post said "Artemis Fowl is great ... a new thriller fairy tale that will grab your interest, no matter your age." and the Library Journal said "Fun to read, full of action and humour, this is recommended for all public libraries and to readers of all ages." Time said, "Artemis Fowl is pacy, playful, and very funny, an inventive mix of myth and modernity, magic and crime", while The New York Times Book Review said that "Colfer has done enormously, explosively well."

Kate Kellaway of the Observer called the book "a smart, amusing one-off. It flashes with hi-tech invention—as if Colfer were as much an inspired boffin as a writer." The Amazon.com official review highly complimented the book, saying "Fantastic stuff from beginning to end, Artemis Fowl is a rip-roaring, 21st century romp of the highest order."

However, another Time magazine review criticised the "abysmal" writing and the characterisation, calling Artemis' character "repellent in almost every regard." It concluded that Artemis Fowl is "an awkward, calculated, humorless and mean-spirited book." USA Today's review concluded: "All the familiar action-flick clichés are trotted out: the backstabbing, politically astute subordinate; the seemingly loony but loyal computer expert; the dabs of family loyalty; the requisite happy ending; the utterly unsubtle plugs for the sequel; the big action scenes. ... Resist the hype, parents, booksellers and librarians. This is not the new Harry Potter, nor is it a good children's book."

== Adaptations ==
=== Film ===
In 2001, plans were announced for a film adaptation of the series. Miramax Films was named as purchasing the film rights, with Lawrence Guterman signed to direct. In 2003 Colfer stated that a screenplay had been finalised and that casting was due to start the same year, but expressed scepticism over whether or not this would come to pass. The film remained in development and was assumed to be in development hell until 2011, when it was reported that Jim Sheridan was interested in directing the film. In July 2013, it was announced that Disney was developing a project based on the first and second instalment of the Artemis Fowl series. Robert De Niro and Jane Rosenthal would be the executive producers and Kenneth Branagh would direct. The film was originally scheduled for a theatrical release on 9 August 2019 by Walt Disney Studios Motion Pictures, but on 7 May 2019 the film was delayed to 29 May 2020. On 3 April the film's theatrical release was cancelled due to the COVID-19 pandemic, and instead it debuted on Disney+ on 12 June 2020. The film was later removed from the streaming service on 26 May 2023 as part of a Disney+ and Hulu purge.

=== Graphic novel ===
Artemis Fowl: The Graphic Novel is a graphic novel based on the book. Written by Colfer and adapted by Andrew Donkin with the art by Giovanni Rigano, the graphic novel was released on 2 October 2007. The plot remains the same as the book's except some minor details. Some characters' appearances differed from their description in the book; Holly Short's hair is longer than described in the book and a darker brown, as opposed to the reddish brown described in the book, and her skin appears noticeably lighter than the nut-brown coffee-like complexion she had previously been described as possessing. Haven City's roof is stalactites and rock as opposed to the computer-generated sky described by the book. The graphic novel does not contain many word balloons, showing each character's story in first person. Graphic novels for subsequent books in the series were released in 2009, 2013 and 2014.

Later, in 2019, in promotion of the upcoming 2020 film, Disney released a new version of the graphic novel, this time adapted by Michael Moreci and drawn by Stephen Gilpin. It skims over the therapist reports and cuts out the second scene of Artemis and his mother for pacing.

== Publication history ==
- Artemis Fowl (Hardcover). US: Miramax. 2001. ISBN 0-7868-0801-2.
- Artemis Fowl (Hardcover). England and Ireland: Viking Children's Books – Viking Press. 2001. ISBN 0-670-89962-3.
- Artemis Fowl (Paperback). England and Ireland: Puffin Books. 2002. ISBN 0-14-131212-2.
- Artemis Fowl (Paperback). US: Miramax. 2002. ISBN 0-7868-1707-0.
- Artemis Fowl (Paperback). US: Miramax. 2006. ISBN 1-4231-0515-X.
