= Ashley Lloyd =

British actor and dancer (born 1991)

- Born: 6 July 1991 (age 35); Blackpool, England
- Occupations: Actor, Dancer

Ashley Lloyd (billed as Ashley Luke Lloyd) (born 6 July 1991) is a British actor and dancer, who has performed in hit musical theatre shows such as Billy Elliot the Musical and Whistle Down the Wind. In 2012 Lloyd appeared in the new musical Loserville at the Garrick Theatre in London. Lloyd appeared in the Original London Cast of Dreamgirls at The Savoy Theatre and is appeared in the west end revival of Saturday Night Fever at The Peacock Theatre in London. Fans of Hollyoaks might recognise Lloyd from the hit TV show playing Troy. Lloyd is currently appearing as Daniel in Feature Film Goodwin Island streaming on Amazon Prime.

== Early life ==
Ashley Luke Lloyd was born in Blackpool, England, and attended school at Bispham High School Arts College. He also attended classes at Scream Theatre School. Lloyd was privately educated when engaged in professional acting contracts starting from age 9. At 16 years old, he took part in a part-time vocational course in Musical Theatre at Phil Winston's Theatreworks and is represented by Red Door Management.

== Acting career ==
Lloyd started acting at a young age performing in various advertising commercials including Kinder Egg and playing child lead "Poor Baby" in Andrew Lloyd Webber's UK touring production of Whistle Down The Wind. He then went on to play the role of Michael in Billy Elliot the Musical. After leaving the West End, Ashley had small roles in many British television shows including Waterloo Road, The Royal, Half Moon Investigations and he played Zak in I Could Never Be Your Woman, alongside Michelle Pfeiffer and Saoirse Ronan.

In 2010, Lloyd played Mark in The Lowry, Manchester's Revival of A Chorus Line, Ichii in British daytime TV show Doctors, and appeared on So You Think You Can Dance where he reached "The Green Mile" but didn't reach the Top 14. Lloyd has also been seen on a television campaign for Gamestation.

From 18 June to 14 July 2012 Lloyd appeared in Loserville: The Musical at the West Yorkshire Playhouse. The musical is written by Busted's James Bourne and Elliot Davis. Along with Lloyd the cast also included Eliza Hope Bennett, Lil' Chris, Gareth Gates and Aaron Sidwell.

Lloyd made his first leading role in a movie in the film Gingerclown 3D (2013), in which he played Sam Tulley alongside Tim Curry, Sean Young and Lance Henriksen. It was filmed in Hungary and directed by Balazs Hatvani.

Lloyd played the role of Eddie in the international tour of Mamma Mia!.

Lloyd went on to play Kit in Alan Menken's A Christmas carol at the Blackpool opera house before joining the European tour of Andrew Lloyd Webber's Jesus Christ Superstar.

After Touring Lloyd returned to South Korea in Leicester Curve's production of Legally Blonde which headlined the DIMF festival.

Ashley Luke Lloyd returns to the West End autumn 2016 joining the cast of Dreamgirls at the savoy theatre.

== Choreography ==
Lloyd has choreographed and performed at various events, music videos and production shows in the UK and Cyprus. Lloyd was part of the resident dance crew On BBC1's Let's Dance For Comic Relief in 2013.

== Television and filmography ==
Year	Role	Title
2005	Zak	I Could Never Be Your Woman
2006	James	The Royal
2007	Forest Mount Boy	Waterloo Road
2009	Nigel Godfrey	Half Moon Investigations
2010	Ichii	Doctors
2013	Sam Tulley	Gingerclown 3D
