= Rory Elrick =

Scottish actor

- Born: Rory Elrick
- Occupation: Actor
- Known for: Half Moon Investigations

Rory Elrick is Scottish actor best known for starring as the title character Fletcher Moon in the BBC television series Half Moon Investigations based on the best-selling novel by Eoin Colfer.

== Career ==
He also appeared in Wilbur Wants to Kill Himself, which was directed by Lone Scherfig and written by Lone Scherfig and Anders Thomas Jensen.

== Filmography ==
=== Television ===
Year	Programme	Role
2009	Half Moon Investigations	Fletcher Moon

=== Film ===
Year	Film	Role
2002	Wilbur Wants to Kill Himself	Angus
