= Legend of Spud Murphy =

Book by Eoin Colfer

First edition (publ. Puffin Books)

The Legend of Spud Murphy is part of a series called "Eoin Colfer's legend of ...", written by the Irish author Eoin Colfer, author of the best-selling series Artemis Fowl. The book was illustrated by Glenn McCoy. The series talks about two brothers: Will, who is nine years old and loves action man and Marty who is 10 years old. Colfer wrote two more books in the series: the Legend of Captain Crow's Teeth in 2006 and the Legend of the Worst Boy in the World in 2008.

== Plot ==
"Suddenly, a shadow fell across my brother. . . It was Spud. She had appeared without a sound, like a ninja librarian."

Will and Marty Woodman live in a family with their mum, dad and three other brothers. In their summer holidays their mother decides that they should take up an educative hobby, so she sends them to the library twice a week. Will and Marty are alarmed by this, due to having heard a story about "Spud" Murphy, the librarian, who is rumoured to shoot kids with a gas-powered spud gun that she keeps under her desk (hence the nickname "Spud") if they make a noise in the library.

Will and Marty go to the library every week, but Marty always tries to pull tricks on Spud, like swapping the books around and going off the carpet in the children's section, but he is always caught red handed. In the end he stays in the children's section pretending to read a book. At the end of the day their mother finds them reading a book and decides they should go to the library three times a week because she's so happy to see them reading. One day, a story about a giant catches Will's eye. Before he realizes it, he's half way through the book. When he looks at Marty he sees his brother is really reading too. When their mother comes Marty and Will don't want to go home. Quickly Marty and Will finish all the books in the children's section and don't know what to do. Without being seen, Marty sneaks to the adult section and takes a book while the librarian is absent. Will and Marty read "Spies in Siberia" together until Spud comes along and takes a look at the adult section. Amazingly, she knows which book has been taken from all the books in the adult section. Her suspects fall immediately on the Woodman brothers. Will confesses that he took the book because they had both finished all the ones in the children's section. Mrs Murphy is happy they left the carpet to find a book, and not because they wanted to mess up the library. In the end, Mrs Murphy, or "Angela", as she tells the two boys to call her, rewards them with adult library cards, allowing them to go anywhere they want in the library.
