= Saltee Islands =

Two islands in Ireland

Coordinates: 52°07′N 6°36′W

The Saltees
Native name: Na Sailtí
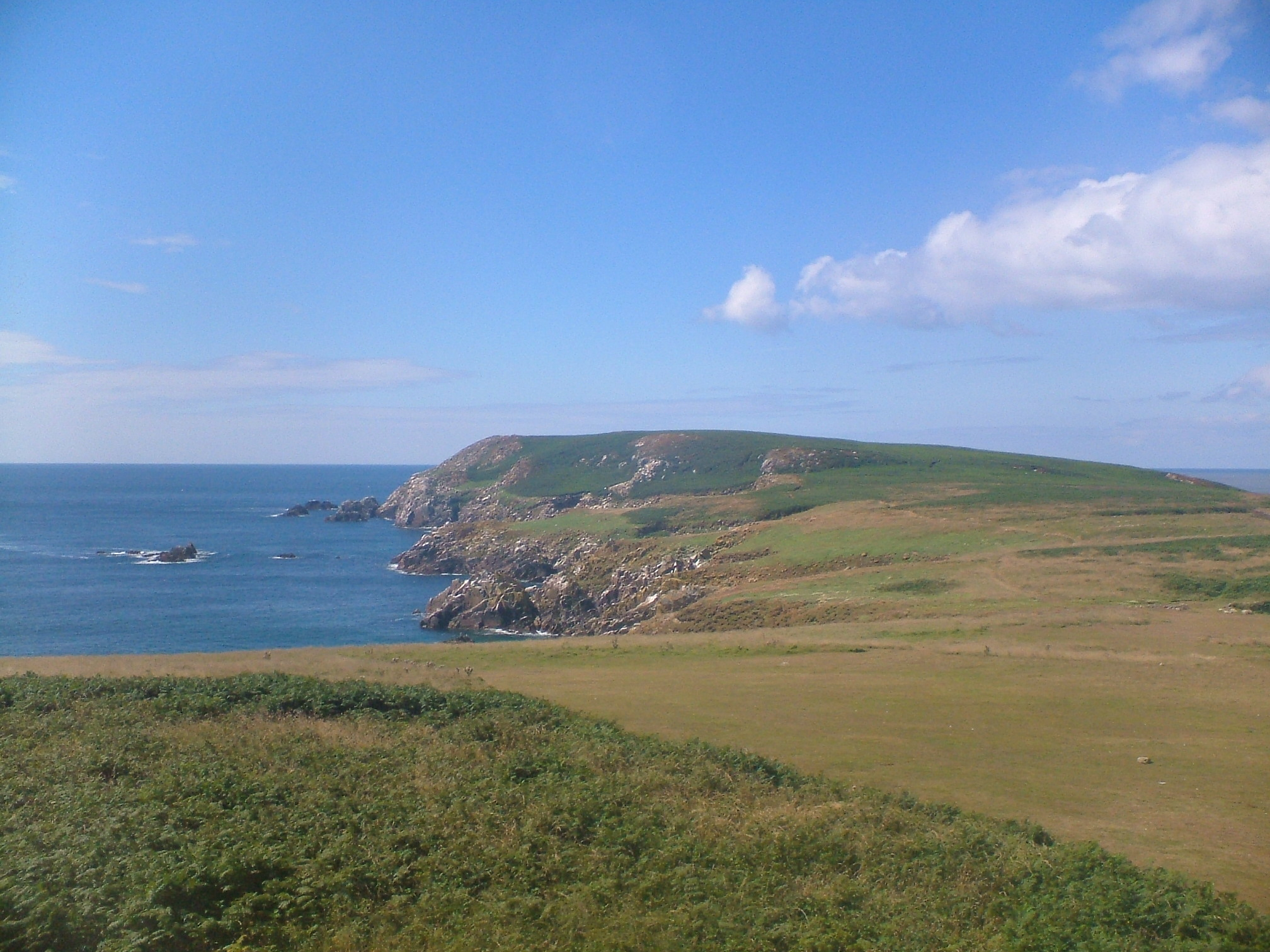
- Great Saltee, the larger of the two islands
- Interactive map of The Saltees

Geography
- Location: Atlantic Ocean
- Total islands: 2
- Major islands: Great Saltee, Little Saltee
- Area: 1.2 km^{2} (0.46 sq mi)

Administration
- Ireland
- County: Wexford

Demographics
- Population: 2 (2011) (Note: At the time of the 2011 census (Sunday 10 April 2011), the return for "Saltee Little (ED 111 Kilmore), Co Wexford" indicates that there were 2 people on the island.)

The Saltee Islands (Irish: Na Sailtí; Old Norse: Saltey) are a pair of small islands lying 5 kilometres off the southern coast of County Wexford in Ireland. The two islands are Great Saltee (89 ha (0.89 km^{2})) and Little Saltee (37 ha (0.37 km^{2})), with a combined area of 126 ha (1.26 km^{2}).

They have been largely unoccupied since the early 20th century and have been privately owned by the Neale family since 1943. Today, they are a conservation area, especially for birds.

== Protected status ==
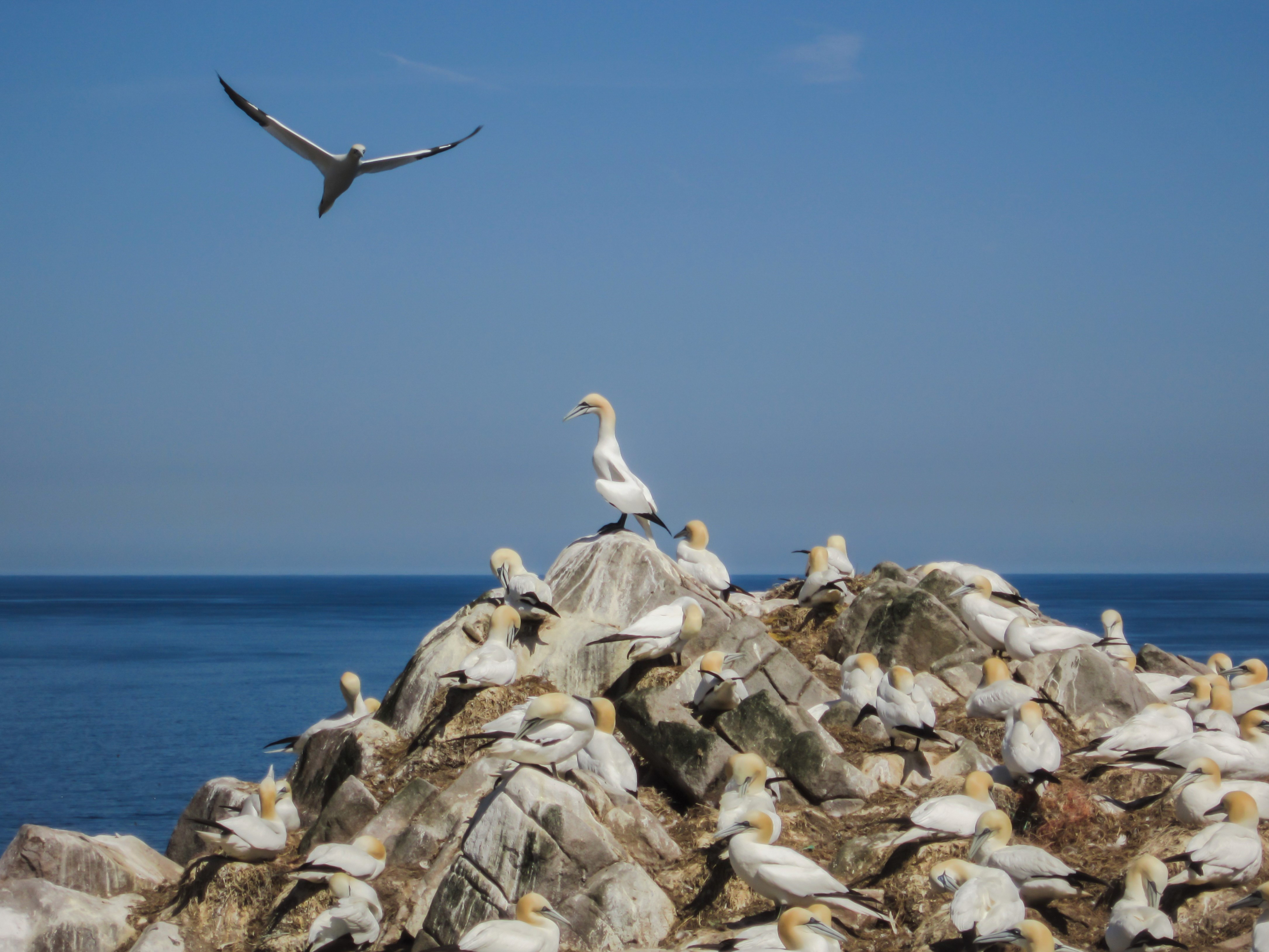
Gannets on Great Saltee

The islands are a breeding ground for fulmar, gannet, shag, kittiwake, guillemot, razorbill, puffin and grey seal. An area surrounding both islands and extending approximately 500 m (1,600 ft) offshore was granted the status of a Special Protection Area to protect the bird habitat. The islands are also at the centre of a related Special Area of Conservation, named after them, which extends to the mainland coastline east of Kilmore Quay.

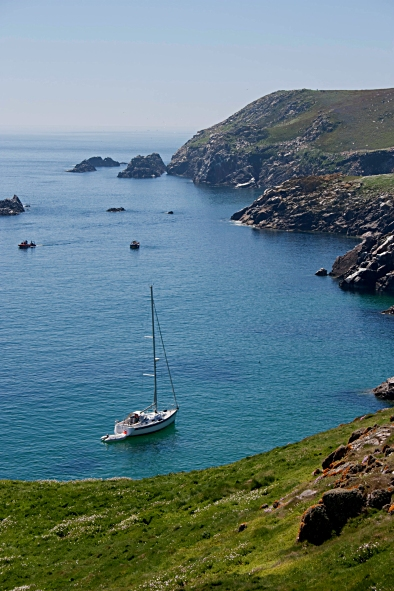
Boat off the coast of Saltee

The conservation area specifically addresses: the mud and sand flats on the mainland coastline as well as those surrounding the mainland facing sides of Little Saltee; large shallow inlets and bays to the west of an imaginary line joining Kilmore Quay and Great Saltee; reefs throughout the entire area; the vegetated sea cliffs which surround both islands; sea caves along the south coast of Great Saltee and the entire area as a grey seal habitat with specific reference to both islands as important sites, including for breeding, along with some areas further out also of interest as moult and resting haul-out sites.

=== Important Bird Area ===
The islands have been designated an Important Bird Area (IBA) by BirdLife International because they support breeding populations of several species of seabirds.

== Geology and geography ==
The islands are based on Pre-Cambrian bedrock between 600 million and 2 billion years old. The highest point in the Saltees is South Summit on Great Saltee at 198 feet (60 metres). The waters around the islands can be treacherous, hence the area is known as the "Graveyard of a Thousand Ships and the islands their tombstones".

== History ==
The name saltee comes from the Ostmen, or Danish Vikings who settled in the baronies of Forth and Bargy sometime in the 9th and 10th centuries, meaning in the original old Norse, "salt islands". So called, not due to the presence of any minerals on the islands but after the salt sprays that cover the entire islands during winter storms. The Irish name for the islands was later adopted in the same vein. While there may have been earlier occupation on Great Saltee, and an Ogham stone is recorded as being found on the island, the first written record of the island dates to c. 1177, when Hervey de Montmorency is recorded as granting the islands to Christchurch, Canterbury. The islands were subsequently granted to the monks of Tintern Abbey and the "two islands of Salteye" are mentioned in Tintern charters dated to 1245. The northeastern point of Great Saltee (closest to the mainland) was historically known as "Abbey Point" and ruined buildings close to it sometimes associated with a "religious house". A nearby field is marked in some maps as "Abbey Field".

By the 16th century, the islands had been leased by John Isham of Bryanstown. They were subsequently acquired by the Grogan-Morgan family of Johnstown Castle. Following the Battle of New Ross in 1798, the United Irishman commander, Bagenal Harvey, fled to Great Saltee. However, he was betrayed and arrested and executed in Wexford town. The Grogan-Morgans, who were in possession of the islands as of 1837, leased the islands to several families associated with nearby Kilmore Quay. According to A Topographical Dictionary of Ireland, published by Samuel Lewis in 1837, there were then approximately 20 inhabitants on Great Saltee and Little Saltee was "inhabited by a family consisting of three persons". The islands, which were largely abandoned by the early 20th century, contain a number of (mainly 19th century) ruins.

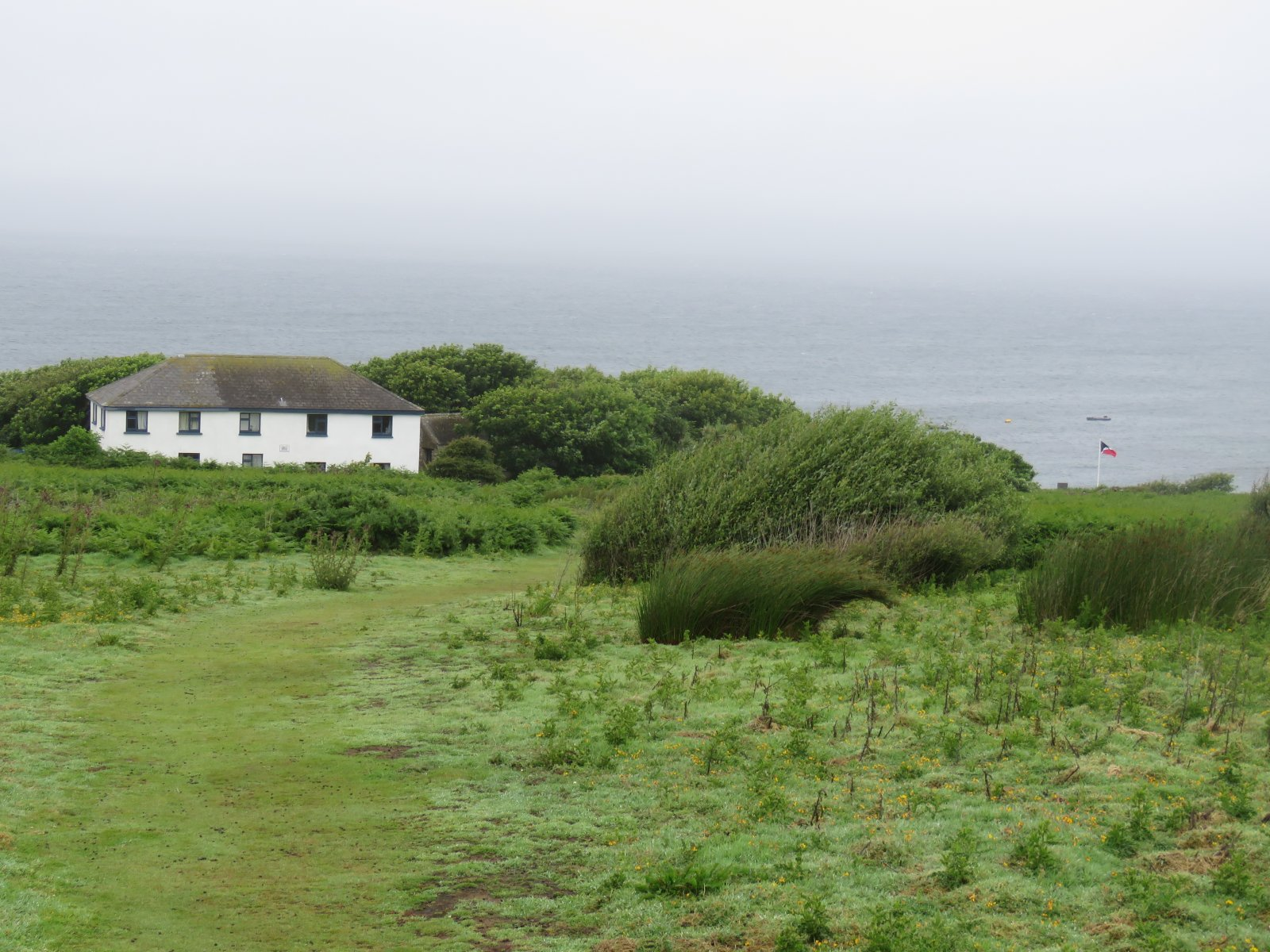
Neale family residence, Great Saltee

Michael Neale, originally of Kilmore Quay, purchased Great Saltee in the 1940s. The Neale family, who still own the island, built a number of small commemorative structures on Great Saltee. While the Neale family are periodically in residence on Great Saltee, it is otherwise largely unoccupied.

== Demographics ==
Historical population

| Year | Pop. | ±% |
|---|---|---|
| 1841 | 0 | — |
| 1851 | 0 | 0.00% |
| 1861 | 0 | 0.00% |
| 1871 | 0 | 0.00% |
| 1881 | 0 | 0.00% |
| 1891 | 0 | 0.00% |
| 1901 | 0 | 0.00% |
| 1911 | 0 | 0.00% |

| Year | Pop. | ±% |
|---|---|---|
| 1926 | 0 | 0.00% |
| 1936 | 0 | 0.00% |
| 1946 | 0 | 0.00% |
| 1951 | 0 | 0.00% |
| 1956 | 0 | 0.00% |
| 1961 | 0 | 0.00% |
| 1966 | 0 | 0.00% |
| 1971 | 0 | 0.00% |

| Year | Pop. | ±% |
|---|---|---|
| 1979 | 0 | 0.00% |
| 1981 | 0 | 0.00% |
| 1986 | 0 | 0.00% |
| 1991 | 6 | — |
| 1996 | 0 | −100.0% |
| 2002 | 0 | 0.00% |
| 2006 | 0 | 0.00% |
| 2011 | 2 | — |

Sources: "CNA17: Population by Off Shore Island, Sex and Year". / "CNA35: Population of Offshore Islands since 1841".

== Popular culture ==
- The Saltee Islands are the setting for Eoin Colfer's book Airman as a powerful sovereign state based around diamond industry. The book is a work of fiction, and no significant natural resources have been found.
