= The Wish List (novel) =

2001 novel by Eoin Colfer

- First edition
- Author: Eoin Colfer
- Language: English
- Genre: Fantasy
- Publisher: O'Brien Press
- Publication date: 2001, October 1, 2003 (audiobook)
- Publication place: Ireland
- Media type: Print (hardback and paperback) and audio-CD and audio cassette
- Pages: 256 (hardcover edition)
- ISBN: 0-7868-1863-8 (hardcover edition)
- OCLC: 52633349
- LC Class: PZ7.C677475 Wi 2003

The Wish List is a fantasy novel by Irish writer Eoin Colfer. It chronicles the adventures of Meg Finn, a teenage girl killed in a gas explosion who must earn her place in Heaven by returning to Earth to help the pensioner she attempted to rob.

== Plot summary ==
Meg Finn is a teenage girl who tries to rob local pensioner Lowrie McCall's house to get money and run away from her abusive stepfather Franco. She is the accomplice of a local thug named Belch and his pit bull. Lowrie interrupts their break-in, prompting Belch's dog to attack him. Belch refuses to call the dog off, until Meg takes Lowrie's shotgun and tries to force Belch to call an ambulance. Belch snatches the shotgun, forcing Meg to flee. Belch corners her at an old gas tank and fires a warning shot at Meg, meaning to scare her, but hits the gas tank, which explodes, killing Meg, Belch and his dog instantly. Meg's spirit gets into the tunnel leading to her Heaven/Hell and also meets Belch's and his dog's spirit fused together. The Belch-dog hybrid is immediately sent to Hell, but Meg remains trapped in the tunnel.

Interested in Meg due to the cruel revenge she inflicted on her stepfather, Satan orders his right hand Beelzebub to get Meg's spirit to hell. Beelzebub investigates Meg's situation with the help of St. Peter, who decides if mortals deserve to be allowed to enter heaven, and both are surprised to discover that Meg's good intentions are balanced by her sinful actions. Unbeknownst to St. Peter, Beelzebub has the technology wizard Myishi send Belch and the hologram Elph to capture Meg. Meg learns her situation from the tunnel mite Flit, and through his guidance returns to earth as a spirit. With no other purpose, she decides to do some good by helping the injured Lowrie to complete his wish list, four wrongs in his disastrous life that he feels he must right. The first wish sees Lowrie find the courage to kiss his first love, now a famous television host. Although Meg is attacked by Belch, the completion of the wish blasts the dog-boy back to hell, taking him and Elph out of the picture for a time. Meg and Lowrie complete the second wish—break into Croke Park and score a goal—without too much incident. The third wish is more problematic; Lowrie wishes to punch Brendan Ball, an old school bully, but when Meg helps Lowrie find the man, Brendan invites Lowrie into his house, then apologises for his actions, leading Lowrie to decide against punching him.

After Lowrie bids Brendan goodbye, Meg asks for Lowrie's help in punching her stepfather Franco. Lowrie agrees, but only on the condition that Meg shows him what the man did to make Meg seek her revenge. Meg reveals that Franco was a slob who spent his days watching television, and abused Meg and her mother. After her mother died in a car accident, Meg's situation got even worse. The final straw was when Franco stole her mother's engagement ring from Meg to pay for a new television. Meg then plotted a scheme to humiliate Franco: she filmed him hitting her, recorded herself destroying the new television, and played this footage back at Franco. She then recorded Franco's reaction, and had his friends watch all the footage, leaving him in total disgrace.

Knowing their time is short, and Meg will likely try to settle her score with Franco, Belch and Elph return to Earth, find Franco and drain his life force, only for Belch to become trapped in Franco's rapidly aged body. Meg and Lowrie arrive, and punch Belch in Franco's body. Finally, Lowrie and Meg head to the Cliffs of Moher so Lowrie can spit over them in honour of a song. Belch and Elph pursue them in Franco's body on a motorbike, and succeed in stopping Lowrie's heart, dragging Meg to hell. As she returns to the tunnel, the tunnel-mite Flit reminds her of pebbles given to her to extend her time on Earth, thus allowing Meg to go back and use the stones' power to revive Lowrie and help him complete his last wish. Her last act of kindness sees Meg choose to give up her remaining time on Earth to restore Franco's life force. Upon returning to the tunnel for the third and final time, Meg is sent to heaven by St. Peter, and smells her mother's perfume as she prepares to rejoin her.

== Characters ==
=== Major characters ===
- Meg Finn – The protagonist, a rebellious teenager
- Lowrie McCall – The old man with many regrets whom Meg and Belch tried to rob.
- Belch Brennan – The main antagonist, a teenage thug who commits crimes in his spare time.
- Elph – An AI help computer program made by Myishi in his own image.
- St. Peter – The saint who decides whether or not a soul is allowed into Heaven.
- Beelzebub – Satan's right-hand demon.

== Portrayal of relationship between Heaven and Hell ==
Unlike many novels about the relationship of Heaven to Hell and the traditional Christian portrayal, Hell is not a place of eternal pain and torture, more akin to Purgatory. For instance, Satan does not always take pleasure in killing or torturing others, seeing it more as a given role than a personal pleasure. Beelzebub is also tasked with all of Satan's inane duties, including handling the capture of Meg Finn herself. Likewise, Heaven is not completely pure, as Saint Peter seems to take pleasure in sending souls to limbo instead of through the Pearly Gates, as well as letting souls through that are not completely pure. Saint Peter also pokes fun at his own station and Heaven itself; at the end of the book, when Meg is let through to Heaven, he comments that the 'Pearly Gates' are not pearly, it just sounded more appealing than "hole in the sky".

== Connections ==
The Myishi Corporation is featured as a company in The Supernaturalist, a 2004 cyberpunk novel written by Eoin Colfer. Colfer confirmed at the EIBF 2008 that this was a purposeful reference to Myishi from The Wish List (having been the company he been the founder/CEO of in life), as he wanted his books to be set in the same fictional universe, comparing his universe to Marvel's. Ishi Myishi and the Myishi Corporation would later appear/be referenced in Colfer's 2019 novel The Fowl Twins.

Meg Finn shares her surname with Conor Finn, the alter ego of Conor Broekhart, the protagonist of Eoin Colfer's book Airman and with Colfer's son, Finn Colfer.

== See also ==
- Second Chance (1987 TV series) – A man is too good to go to Hell but not good enough to go to Heaven so is assigned tasks by God in order to go to Heaven.
