= The Wish List =

The Wish List may refer to:

- Wish list, a compilation of desired items, usually as a request for gifts
- The Wish List (novel), a novel by Eoin Colfer
- The Wish List (political organization), a political action committee in the U.S.
- The Wish List (EP), an EP by Tinchy Stryder
- "The Wish List" (Doctors), a 2004 television episode
