= Plugged (novel) =

2011 novel by Eoin Colfer

- First edition (UK)
- Author: Eoin Colfer
- Language: English
- Genre: crime
- Publisher: Headline (UK); The Overlook Press (US)
- Publication date: 12 May 2011
- Publication place: Ireland
- Media type: Print (hardback)
- Pages: 288
- ISBN: 978-0-7553-7998-9

Plugged is a 2011 crime novel by Eoin Colfer.

The cover was first shown in an interview with Artemis Fowl Confidential. It was published in a slightly revised format.
