= Benny Shaw =

Benny and Omar
- Author: Eoin Colfer
- Cover artist: John Canty
- Language: English
- Series: The Benny Books
- Genre: Children's literature
- Publisher: Puffin Books
- Publication date: 1998
- Publication place: Ireland
- Pages: 237
- ISBN: 0-14-330057-1
- OCLC: 155878841
- Followed by: Benny and Babe

Benny and Babe
- Author: Eoin Colfer
- Cover artist: John Canty
- Language: English
- Series: The Benny Books
- Genre: Children's literature
- Publisher: Puffin Books
- Publication date: 1999
- Publication place: Ireland
- Pages: 238
- ISBN: 0-14-330056-3
- Preceded by: Benny and Omar

Benny Shaw is the protagonist of two children's literature novels by Irish author Eoin Colfer. The first book in the series, Benny and Omar, sees Benny move from Ireland to Tunisia and befriend a local boy. The second book, Benny and Babe, deals with Benny's holiday in Ireland and a friendship with a local girl.

== Benny and Omar ==
An Irish boy named Benny, who is on an all-Ireland hurling team, journeys to Tunisia because of his father's new oversea job. He is determined to hate and find fault with the country and annoys everyone. Then he meets another boy called Omar. They develop a friendship through Omar's "telly-speak" English. Benny's father bans Benny from seeing Omar because he thinks that Omar is a bad influence and because Benny went off with Omar when he was supposed to look after his brother. Benny endures punishment for being with Omar, but that doesn't stop him from running away with him the second his parents trust him again in order to rescue Omar's drugged and hospitalized sister Kaheena. Benny is exposed to real life in Tunisia, actual pain and suffering bigger than losing a sports match, and realizes just how lucky he is after Omar drowns in a flood (although, this is, in fact, arguable, as the bracelet Benny gave to Omar was found on a tree).

== Benny and Babe ==
This story takes place on Benny's summer holidays, which he spends with his grandfather in the country. "Babe" Meara is the village tomboy. Babe and Benny become partners and start a business finding lost lures and re-selling them. Benny refers to the people living in Duncade, the place where he is spending his holidays, as culchies. Benny and the other culchies versed in hurling and Babe unexpectedly won. Benny and Babe's business seems to be going well until they meet Furty Howlin, an old friend back from reforming school and an unpleasant person to deal with. He tries to get Benny and Babe out of business. While trying to get to the Black Chan, something terribly wrong happens to Benny. He almost drowns but is saved by Jerry. The book ends with Babe coming over to Benny's house.
