= Half Moon Investigations (TV series) =

- Title card
- Genre: Children's
- Created by: Eoin Colfer
- Starring: Rory Elrick; Sebastian Charles; Olive Gray; Nicola Duffell; Jennifer Black
- Theme music composer: Iain Cook
- Country of origin: United Kingdom
- No. of series: 1
- No. of episodes: 13

Production
- Executive producer: Josephine Ward
- Producer: Johnathan Phillips
- Running time: 30 minutes

Original release
- Network: BBC
- Release: 5 January – 30 March 2009

Half Moon Investigations is a children's crime/comedy drama television series created by the BBC and based upon the novel of the same name by the author Eoin Colfer. It concerns a schoolboy, Fletcher Moon, who spends much of his spare time solving petty crimes around his school, St Jerome's. 13 episodes were first broadcast between January and March 2009. The series was filmed in and around a disused secondary school as well as a Centre for adults with special needs located in Bellshill, North Lanarkshire.

== Background ==
Fletcher Moon (often referred to as Half Moon because of his height) is a schoolboy attending St. Jerome's school. Although it is not stated in the series where the school is situated, the novel upon which the TV series is based has St. Jerome's located in the town of Lock, Wexford, Ireland. Every week a crime is committed and it is up to Half Moon and his private detective business to find the culprit by analysing a series of clues and witnesses.

== Characters ==
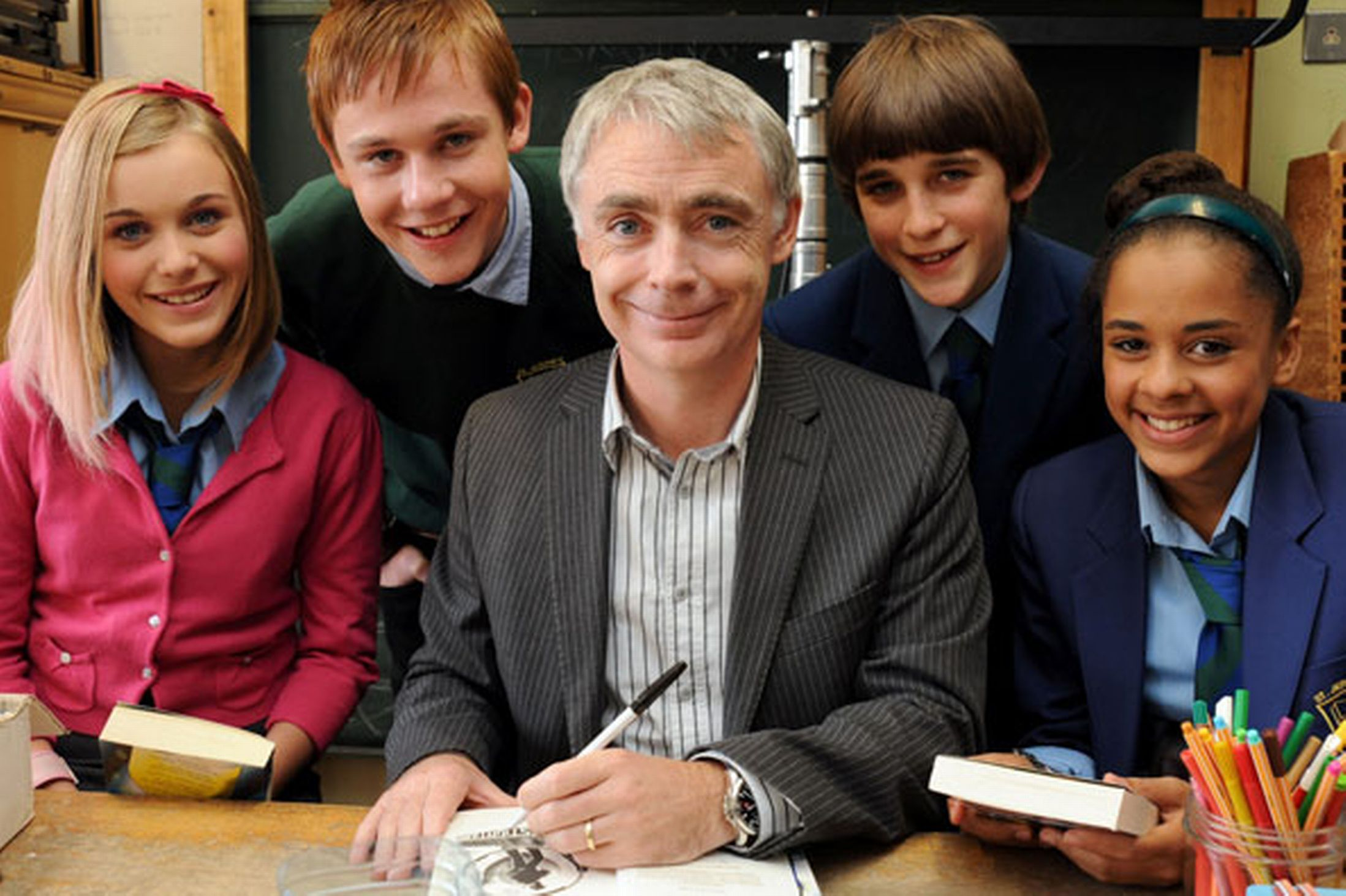
Eoin Colfer with the cast of Half Moon Investigations after touring the Scottish set

=== Main ===
- Fletcher "Half" Moon (Rory Elrick) – Fletcher is a teenage private detective who, at the beginning of the series, has just graduated from Bob Bernstein's Online Academy For Investigative Excellence. He has the nickname "Half Moon" because of his small height. He sets up his own detective agency at St. Jerome's School with his best friend Red Sharkey.
- Red Sharkey (Sebastian Charles) – Red is Fletcher's right-hand-man helping him with his investigations. He is the eldest of his siblings – collectively known as the "Sharkeys". His mother died prior to the events of the series, the death is shown to weigh heavily on him. He is sent back a year to Fletcher's year group at the beginning of the series.
- Mia Stone (Olive Gray) – Mia is the editor of the St. Jerome's School student newspaper. She frequently gets herself involved in Half Moon's investigations in order to get news pieces for her paper.
- April Devereux (Nicola Duffell) – April is the leader of the 'Pinks' girl gang and hates boys. She is shown to regularly plot against male characters in the series and manipulate the other 'Pinks'. She is from a wealthy family, her father is said to be a "generous supporter of the school" and is implied to own a food business.
- Principal Quinn (Jennifer Black) – Principal Quinn is the Principal of Saint Jerome's School who favours hardline discipline.

=== Supporting ===
- Zara (Rameet Sandhu) – Zara is April's best friend and member of the 'Pinks'.
- Mercedes (Marion Weaver) – Mercedes is another member of the 'Pinks' and is shown to be a talented pianist.
- Hazel Moon (Robin Milne) – Hazel is Fletcher's older sister. She is frequently cited by her brother as having "multiple personalities", changing her appearance, personality and interests to get closer to boys she's interested in at the school.
- Mrs Moon (Hilary Maclean) – Mrs Moon is Fletcher's mother and a nurse.
- Mr Moon (Gary MacKay) – Mr Moon is Fletcher's father. He tries to get Fletcher to be more interested in sports.
- Genie Sharkey (Kathleen Kidd) – Genie is Red's younger sister.
- Herod Sharkey (Marcus Nash) – Herod is Red's younger brother and the youngest of the Sharkey siblings. At one point in the series he is voted in as his year's representative.
- Papa Sharkey (Russell Anderson) – Papa Sharkey is Red's single father. He is shown to be a caring father, who struggles with the passing of his wife and keeping his children out of trouble.
- Doobie (Robert Carr) – Doobie is a student at St. Jerome's.

== Reception ==
Similar to the novel, the TV series has received generally positive reviews both critically and from viewers, with the first three episodes scoring on average 7.7/10 on Internet Movie Database.
