= Gingerclown =

Gingerclown 3D
- Movie poster
- Directed by: Balázs Hatvani
- Written by: Balázs Hatvani
- Produced by: Balázs Hatvani; Krisztián Lippert; Zsuzsa Gulyas; Levente Kiss
- Starring: Erin Hayes; Ashley Lloyd; Tim Curry
- Cinematography: Péter Gráf
- Edited by: Balázs Hatvani
- Music by: Róbert Gulya
- Production companies: Cinelabyrinth Entertainment; Lionsgate Home Entertainment; Movierockets Entertainment
- Distributed by: Movierockets Entertainment (Hungary)
- Release date: 9 May 2013 (Hungary)
- Running time: 83 minutes
- Country: Hungary
- Language: English

Gingerclown 3D is a 2013 English-language Hungarian horror comedy film written and directed by Balázs Hatvani. The film stars Erin Hayes and Ashley Lloyd as high school students intruding in an old amusement park inhabited by monsters, with Tim Curry, Lance Henriksen, Michael Winslow, Brad Dourif and Sean Young providing the voices of the creatures that terrorize them.

== Plot ==
In 1983, a group of high school students led by Biff run into their nerdy classmate Sam (Ashley Lloyd), whom they instantly begin to bully. In order to prove himself to Biff and also win the affection of Biff's good natured girlfriend, Jenny (Erin Hayes) he agrees to sneak into an old abandoned amusement park to prove his courage.

Tired of Biff's antics, Jenny follows Sam into the amusement park. After catching up with him and suggesting they should leave, feeling something is not right about the park. Suddenly, various attractions in the amusement park begin to light up. Their presence in the park has come to the attention of a creature known as Gingerclown (Tim Curry) who now attempts to torment and kill the duo. Trying to find a way out of the park, the two run into the other hideous creatures that live within the park (Brad Dourif, Lance Henriksen, Michael Winslow). Getting suspicious of how long Jenny and Sam have been alone together, Biff enters the park searching for them. He is soon found by Gingerclown, who eventually murders him. Jenny and Sam are separated from each other, with Sam being chased by Gingerclown and Jenny is captured by a giant spider (Sean Young), but she manages to escape by killing her.

Although they are briefly reunited, Sam is captured by Gingerclown, while Jenny hides. Jenny is soon confronted by Gingerclown, but before he can kill her she chains him to a barrier, while Sam sneaks up behind him and strangles him to death with a chain. Morning comes and the pair, having survived the night, share a kiss.

== Cast ==
- Erin Hayes as Jenny
- Ashley Lloyd as Sam
- Michael Cannell-Griffiths as Biff
- Tim Curry as Gingerclown (voice)
- Lance Henriksen as Braineater (voice)
- Michael Winslow as Stomachcrumble (voice)
- Brad Dourif as Worm Creature (voice)
- Sean Young as Nelly the Spiderwoman (voice)
- Andrew Montesi as tea kettle (voice) website:

== Production ==
The entire film was shot at night at the Budapest Amusement Park, except one scene, that filmed at the last day of shooting, in the morning. The monsters in the film were performed by puppeteers on set, while their voices were provided by veteran actors such as Tim Curry and Sean Young.

== Release ==
The film was first released in cinemas in Hungary on May 9, 2013. It was released Direct-to-DVD in the United Kingdom in November, 2014 by Lions Gate. The company would release the film on DVD in the United States on November 11, 2014.

== See also ==
- It, which also featured Tim Curry as an evil clown
