= The Supernaturalist =

2004 novel by Eoin Colfer

- Cover of the British edition
- Author: Eoin Colfer
- Language: English
- Genre: Science fiction, adventure
- Publisher: Puffin (UK); Miramax (US)
- Publication date: 2004
- Media type: Print (hardcover), audiobook
- Pages: 290 (UK); 267 (US)
- ISBN: 0141380403 (Puffin hc, 2004)
- OCLC: 892527255
- Followed by: To be Announced

The Supernaturalist is a science fiction cyberpunk novel by Irish author Eoin Colfer. The book was influenced by film noir and other predecessors of the cyberpunk science fiction movement. Colfer has outlined plans for a sequel, Avernus.

== Plot ==
The Supernaturalist takes place in Satellite City, a large city in an unspecified location in the Northern Hemisphere, in the third millennium. Much of Satellite City is controlled by the Satellite, owned by Myishi Corporation. By the time of the novel, however, the Satellite is losing links to the surface, causing disasters that range from mild to catastrophic.

The book opens with an introduction to Cosmo Hill, an orphan at the Clarissa Frayne Institute for Parentally Challenged Boys with it later being revealed that Clarissa Frayne not only came up with the term, "no-sponsor" but that she also hated children. At the Institute, the boys are used as human guinea pigs for various products which sees the institute also being paid with the life expectancy for a no-sponsor or an orphan being fifteen years as by the time they're that age, the orphan in question is either dead, has escaped or been sent to a labor prison via a fabricated criminal record. After finishing a test involving a spray, the orphans head to their various spots and spend the evening, eating while communicating via the network, a system that allows them to talk to one another without the marshals knowing as the institute forbids direct contact, believing it could be lead to friendships and eventually a revolt. However, the next day on a trip back from a record company, the truck transporting them crashes. Cosmo and a friend, Francis (aka "Ziplock Murphy") manage to escape the wreckage, but are pursued by a warden, Redwood from the Institute, Redwood having a reputation for making the lives of the no-sponsors he's guarding miserable. The chase takes them to the rooftops, where Redwood attempts to grab Ziplock, only for Ziplock's jumpsuit to rip, sending Cosmo and Ziplock falling into a wrecked generator. Ziplock is electrocuted and dies but Cosmo survives, albeit with multiple critical injuries, including several broken bones and a heart which begins to shut down. He begins seeing small blue creatures around him. When one lands on his chest and begins sucking his life out, three figures appear out of nowhere and kill the creature. Although the teens want to leave him, Cosmo begs them to take him with them, pleading to not be left to be eaten by the strange blue beings while knowing that Redwood will not let him return to the institute, alive. The group labels him a "Spotter" and, after some argument, take him with them before he passes out.

Cosmo wakes up in a warehouse to find his injuries being mended, including a cast on his leg and a steel plate in his head to heal his fractured skull. One of the group, teenager and ex-mechanic Mona Vasquez, introduces herself, and tells Cosmo about the other two: Stefan Bashkir, another teen, who used to be a cop before an accident killed his mother and almost killed him; and Lucien Bonn, nicknamed Ditto due to his habit of repeating what people say. Bonn had gene-splicing experiments performed on him as a baby to produce a "super-human"; however, these experiments did nothing except stunt his growth, making Ditto appear six in spite of his true age of twenty-eight. Mona reveals that the creatures, called Parasites, can only be seen after near-death experiences or severe trauma; Stefan can see them from his accident as a policeman, Mona can see them from a car crash in which Stefan saved her after her gang left her for dead, and Ditto can see them as a result of the gene-splicing experiments. Their group, the eponymous Supernaturalists, attempts to save people from the life-sucking Parasites by destroying as many of the blue creatures as possible. Cosmo is left to recover and is eventually included in their group after proving his worth by saving Mona with Cosmo using his past at the institute to identify a virus that's affecting her, resulting in Cosmo, Stefan and Ditto eating some flowers which they eventually use to expel the virus from Mona's body.

One night, the Supernaturalists stalk out a drag race, as the potential for fatal crashes, and Parasites is large. However, one of the cars is a prototype stolen from Myishi Corporation, who track it down and send a squad of paralegals ("hit lawyers") to take it back. In the following firefight, Cosmo and Stefan are captured by Myishi. They are taken to Ellen Faustino, the president of Myishi, who reveals herself to be a Spotter and that Stefan and the team were mixed up in another operation. She says that energy discharged by the Parasites is forcing the Satellite into an incorrect orbit and causing it to fall out of the sky. She also reveals that the method the Supernaturalists are using to kill the Parasites is only causing them to reproduce faster, increasing the problem with the Satellite. After some discussion, she reveals that she has a plan to kill the Parasites: detonate an electrical bomb in the Parasite hive that contaminates them and eventually kills them. However, she does not know where the hive is and sets the Supernaturalists to find the hive.

After several dead ends, Cosmo hits upon the idea to use the Satellite to scan for the Parasite hive. However, due to an extremely long wait time to get a space on the Satellite, they take an illegal spaceship up to do the scan themselves and find that the hive is under Clarissa Frayne. Cosmo and Stefan take the electric bomb under the orphanage and detonate it, with Stefan doing so after discovering Redwood, who's been placed on leave since the incident that saw Cosmo escape, take Cosmo hostage. Although the bomb doesn't kill any humans, it shorts out the building's security, allowing the orphans to leave after Cosmo has revealed himself, noting this is the only chance they'll get to make a clean break. While Cosmo and Stefan are out, Mona discovers Ditto communicating with a Parasite. When Cosmo, Stefan, and Mona confront him, Ditto claims that Parasites don't take life force, only pain. Not knowing what to believe anymore, Stefan orders Ditto to be out by the next day, but Myishi paralegals capture them all that night.

While imprisoned, Faustino reveals to the Supernaturalists that the bomb didn't kill the Parasites, it merely stunned them, and that she captured them to use for her own purposes. She also tells Stefan that she caused the accident that killed his mother; it was part of an experiment to create a Spotter. After escaping an acid trap intended to kill them, the group reaches a lab with Parasites contained beneath the floor. Stefan is shot by a sniper higher in the room, and President Faustino reveals herself. Faustino tells them that Parasites can be used to "scrub" energy, and she is using the Parasites to make a clean nuclear reactor to keep the Satellite up; the Satellite wasn't falling because of Parasites, but because it had too many attachments on it. After provoking and distracting her, Stefan uses some of his remaining strength to grab onto Faustino in a dead man's grip, and when the sniper attempts to shoot him again he lets his knees buckle, causing the bullet to miss him and break the Parasites' containment cell. The Parasites take Stefan's pain from him as he dies, and Cosmo, Mona, and Ditto escape.

The book ends with the rest of the Supernaturalists getting ready to fight unspecified "other supernatural creatures", and the mayor of Satellite City, Ray Chase sends Faustino to Antarctica to continue working on a nuclear plant. Also, it is hinted that Mona and Cosmo are beginning to become more open with their feelings for each other.

== Characters ==
- Cosmo Hill – The main protagonist of the novel. Found on Cosmonaut Hill, from which he was named. He was sent to the Clarissa Frayne Institute for Parentally Challenged Boys. He was almost killed on an escape attempt along with his best friend (Francis "Ziplock" Murphy), but Cosmo was "saved" by a group of kids who at the time still believed that the Parasites fed on life force, and not pain. He was 14 years old when recruited into the group. Although he has no experience as a medic or spotter, he saves Mona Vasquez a number of times.
- Stefan Bashkir – Stefan is an eighteen-year-old of Russian descent with spiky black hair, presumably tall. His mother was killed in a car accident, later revealed to be due to a bomb planted on the car by Ellen Faustino. He has the worries of someone much older than he is, despite being so young. He is also the leader of the Supernaturalists.
- Mona Vasquez – A Spanish girl, she is a former member and ex-mechanic of the Sweethearts, a street racing gang. She is 15 years old and the love interest of Cosmo. Although she denies it, Ditto is sure that Mona has feelings for Cosmo as well. She has black hair and other Latin features, such as dark eyes. She also has a DNA strand tattooed above one eyebrow.
- Lucien "Ditto" Bonn – A "Bartoli Baby" being the product of the gene splicing experiments done by a Dr. Bartoli 28 years before the story began. He suffers several mutations because of the experiments, such as arrested physical development (Ditto is 28 years old but appears to be about six). Ditto has "healing hands" (the ability to take the pain from a person or animal's body) and is a spotter. He pointed out to the rest of the Supernaturalists near the book's end that the Parasites actually feed on human pain, not on human life force as thought earlier (Ditto was caught by Mona deliberately cutting his finger and offering the pain to a parasite, proving that he knew this secret all along but never told anyone). He is the medic of the group, and does not fight the Parasites, claiming he is a pacifist. He is the first one to go in the group, since Stefan was the one who created the group.
- Ellen Faustino – The main antagonist of the novel who manipulates the Supernaturalists into helping her catch Parasites. Former Instructor at the Police Academy, she is now President of the Development section in Myishi Corp., and was responsible for the death of Stefan's mother.
- Splinter – A former Supernaturalist that preexisted Cosmo. Not much is known about Splinter, he is never actually shown in the book, and only mentioned in passing. He is used as an example of how spotters can become terrified of their visions of the Parasites. He wears glasses with blue filters that hide the Parasites from his eyes, and he never takes them off.
- Miguel – The leader of the Sweethearts gang. He adopted Mona as their mechanic after catching her trying to steal a Sweetheart-owned car.
- Ziplock Murphy – Cosmo's friend and fellow No-Sponsor. The Supernaturalists were unable to save him, due to him having been electrocuted when falling off the roof when he and Cosmo escaped.
- Marshal Redwood – The Marshal who is very strict to Cosmo and all the other no-sponsors. He has cruel tendencies, such as knowingly saying he'd wrap Cosmo and Ziplock when they were on the roof, despite the duo mentioning they would not be able to be taken out of the cellophane for hours.

== Graphic novel ==
The book received a graphic novel adaptation, published July 10, 2012

== Sequel ==
In a September 29, 2007 interview, Eoin Colfer released a rough idea for the plot of the sequel, working title, "Avernus". When asked about ideas for a Supernaturalist sequel, he answers, "Well, the main idea is, well, at the end of book one, Stefan dies, but, being that they can see supernatural beings, in the second book, Stefan appears to Cosmo and tells him that they're all stuck in Limbo and can't get through to the afterlife, because something terrible is happening there, so it's an environmental thing as usual that's blocking the passageway to... forever, so they have to take care of that. But at the same time, they've got the corporation, the Myishi Corporation, trying to track them down." As of 2024, no sequel has been released.
