= Half Moon Investigations =

2006 novel by Eoin Colfer

- First edition cover
- Author: Eoin Colfer
- Cover artist: Art done by Mark Riedy, Designed by Ellice M. Lee
- Language: English
- Genre: Mystery novel
- Publisher: Miramax Books
- Publication date: March 2006
- Publication place: United Kingdom (first edition)
- Media type: Print (Hardback & Paperback)
- Pages: 290 pp
- ISBN: 0-7862-9362-4 (first edition, hardback)
- OCLC: 80910252

Half Moon Investigations is a novel by the Irish author Eoin Colfer. It was first published in United States in March 2006 and was released in the UK and Ireland on 1 June 2006. The paperback edition was released in the UK on 5 July 2007. It has also been adapted as a television series starring Sebastian Charles & Rory Elrick, which aired on the BBC from January 2009.

== Plot summary ==
Fletcher Moon (often called "Half-Moon" due to his short stature) is a natural born investigator. Fletcher is a graduate from the Bernsteins Academy, so he is a "certified" detective. Knowing this, April Devereux, a girl from his school, comes to him for help in finding a lock of hair that she believes to have been stolen. Fletcher agrees to help her and starts off by investigating all suspects which eventually gets him threatened by a thirteen-year-old named Red Sharkey.

While Fletcher is investigating the stolen lock of hair, he is attacked by an unknown assailant and is hospitalized. Fletcher then sneaks out of the hospital to visit April's cousin, May, to photograph this newfound evidence, but ends up at the wrong house, where he catches sight of somebody setting fire to May's lucky dancing costume. He passes out in the yard due to the anesthetic from the hospital and later awakens to find a torch in his hand, with all evidence for the arson pointing to him. Following an interrogation by the police, Fletcher is rescued by Red Sharkey. Fletcher blames Red for the assault, but Red claims he was framed.

Fletcher is given a 24-hour ultimatum to solve the chain of mysteries, and he and Red team up. Following a lead to April's house, they discover the truth behind Les Jeunes Etudiantes, the girls' club, their true goal being to get rid of all the boys ruining their education. Three recent expulsions can be attributed to these girls, and the boys conclude that April was responsible for the crimes. Unfortunately, they are found out, and the girls manage to imprison the boys in the cellar. They are, however, saved by May. Fletcher and Red previously heard the girls practicing the lines that they plan to use to accuse Red's brother, Herod, of assault. Red is able to send a text message to the present police officer informing him of the lines they would use. Using this evidence, the officer exposes the girls as liars, and Herod Sharkey is found innocent, saving him from expulsion. April, being caught, attempts to escape in her father's car but promptly crashes into the police cruiser.

Believing themselves victorious, Red and Fletcher plan to come out of hiding. However, they are informed (by text from the officer) that this still does not solve the mysteries that included Fletcher’s assault. He meets a secret informant who, in exchange for the password of a police account he hacked earlier in the story, discovers that the link between the crimes ended up being the upcoming talent show at his school. Fletcher and Red race to the talent show, and Red suggests that May was the culprit. However, on stage, Fletcher declares that it was May's father, Gregor Devereux, who committed the previous crimes in an attempt to remove Fletcher from the investigation, forcibly eliminate every other talent show contestant (who were all ranked higher than May in the previous year's talent show), and leave May to take first place by default. Gregor is arrested and May becomes resentful of Fletcher. Fletcher, remorseful for hurting May, retires from his detective work.

In the epilogue, one month after Gregor’s arrest, Fletcher reveals he was able to implicate Gregor due to evidence planted on him by Herod during the talent show, and has become depressed from the ordeal. However, Red inspires Fletcher to return to his career, and they decide to form a detective group. Red suggests they name the group "Moon Investigations" while Fletcher replies, "You're half right", referencing his nickname.

== Critical reception ==
Newsround called the book "really exciting" and said "Once you've read page one you'll be hooked to Eoin Colfer's Books".

== Sequel ==
In an interview on 27 September 2007, Colfer admitted he had a rough idea for a second Half Moon book in which Moon goes undercover with a group of goths and listens to Kate Bush and Metallica. He said would find it interesting to expand on the history of Hazel - Moon's sister.

== Television adaptation ==
In 2008, BBC announced a series called Half Moon Investigations to replace Grange Hill. A single 13-episode series later aired.
