= Artemis Fowl =

Science fantasy book series by Eoin Colfer

Artemis Fowl / The Fowl Twins
- First edition cover of the first book
- First cycle: Artemis Fowl; The Arctic Incident; The Eternity Code; The Opal Deception; The Lost Colony; The Time Paradox; The Atlantis Complex; The Last Guardian; Second cycle: The Fowl Twins; Deny All Charges; Get What They Deserve
- Author: Eoin Colfer
- Original title: Artemis Fowl (first cycle); The Fowl Twins (second cycle)
- Illustrator: Goni Montes
- Cover artist: Alex Ferrari
- Language: English
- Genre: Fantasy, children's literature
- Publisher: Viking Press / Disney-Hyperion (United States); Puffin Books (United Kingdom)
- Published: 2001–2012 (first cycle); 2019–2021 (second cycle)
- Media type: Print (hardback & paperback), Audiobook
- No. of books: 11

Artemis Fowl is a series of eleven fantasy novels by Irish author Eoin Colfer, revolving around various members of the Fowl family. The first cycle, the Artemis Fowl series, consists of eight books, and the second cycle, The Fowl Twins series, is a trilogy. Both releases have received commercial success and positive critical reception in the children's literature genre, and also originated graphic novel adaptations. As of 2013, the novels have sold more than 21 million copies in 44 languages, and are one of the best-selling series of all time. In 2010, Artemis Fowl was voted by readers as their favorite Puffin Books title of all time.

A film adaptation based on the first novel was in the process of development by Disney from 2016, and eventually released on the Disney+ streaming service on June 12, 2020 to negative reviews, before being removed from the service on May 26, 2023. An animated series is in development.

== Series overview ==
In the first book, Artemis Fowl, pitched as "Die Hard with fairies", twelve-year-old child prodigy Artemis Fowl II and his bodyguard Butler kidnap Holly Short, an elf and a captain of the Lower Elements Police Reconnaissance force (LEPrecon), holding her for a ransom of one ton of gold to exploit the magical Fairy People and restore his family's fortune.

The Artemis Fowl series, alternatively titled the First Cycle of The Fowl Adventures, introduces Artemis as a villain and the Peoples' enemy, but as the books progress, Artemis's character develops and changes. As an anti-villain, he assists the People and a reluctant Short in resolving conflicts with worldwide ramifications. His moral compass develops throughout the series.

The Fowl Twins series, alternatively titled the Second Cycle of The Fowl Adventures, set five years later, follows Artemis' younger twin brothers as they live out their house arrest under the supervision of "pixel" Lazuli Heitz, an elf-pixie hybrid, and NANNI, an artificial intelligence based on Holly's and Artemis' brainwaves.

=== Artemis Fowl cycle ===
==== Artemis Fowl ====
Artemis Fowl is the first book in the Artemis Fowl series. It follows Holly Short, the first female reconnaissance officer of the Lower Elements Police (LEP), after she is kidnapped by criminal mastermind Artemis Fowl II for a large ransom of 24-karat gold with the help of his bodyguard Domovoi Butler (and Butler's younger sister Juliet) in order to restore the Fowl family fortune. After multiple failed attempts by the LEP to undermine his plot, the book concludes with Artemis finally releasing Holly, in exchange for having his mother cured of madness and half of the ransomed gold that he had persuaded the fairies to give him restored to them, manipulating the LEP's honor system and time-stop to prevent them from killing him afterward.

==== Artemis Fowl and the Arctic Incident ====
Artemis Fowl and the Arctic Incident is the second book of the series. It follows the rescue of Artemis's father Artemis Fowl I from the Russian Mafia, alongside the battle against the B'wa Kell goblin gang who have allied themselves with the maniacal genius pixie Opal Koboi and officer Briar Cudgeon helping her out. The LEP originally suspects Artemis of orchestrating the goblin rebellion, but he is cleared of all suspicion after being inspected with a Retimager. Holly Short, a LEP captain; Julius Root, the LEP commander; and Foaly, a centaur and the main technology supervisor for the LEP, make an agreement with Artemis to work together to stop the goblin rebellion, with the help of Mulch Diggums half-way through. In the end, to fulfill their part of the agreement, they help Artemis find his father, who had been missing for the past two or three years.

==== Artemis Fowl and the Eternity Code ====
Artemis Fowl and the Eternity Code covers Jon Spiro's theft of the fictional C Cube and its recovery. Jon Spiro is an American businessman who has his bodyguard, Arno Blunt, kill Butler and steal Artemis's C Cube, which is a handheld supercomputer that he made from stolen fairy technology left over from the Fowl Manor siege in book 1. Artemis puts Butler into a fish freezer in an emergency attempt at cryonic preservation, and he is eventually resurrected by the elf Holly Short. Mulch Diggums (under the pseudonym Mo Digence) is hired alongside Loafers McGuire by Spiro to kidnap Artemis to access the C Cube, which is encrypted by an Eternity Code only Artemis knows how to decrypt. Holly agrees to help, but with the condition that Artemis and his allies are to be mind-wiped. With the help of the dwarf and Butler's sister, Juliet, they raid Spiro Needle, the building housing Spiro's company, and retrieve the C Cube again. The book ends with the fairies and Foaly mind-wiping the three humans, and Artemis gives Mulch Diggums a (supposed) medallion that Holly gave to Artemis in The Arctic Incident, which is actually a disc that will bring back his memories of the fairies.

==== Artemis Fowl and the Opal Deception ====
The fourth book, Artemis Fowl and the Opal Deception, covers power-hungry and insane pixie Opal Koboi's second attempt at world domination, after her first fruitless attempt in the second novel. Koboi mesmerizes Giovanni Zito, a fictional environmentalist, into believing that she is his daughter, Belinda. She then convinces Giovanni to send a probe into the ground, which could lead to the uncovering of the fairy world, thrusting the fairy city of Haven into human clutches. In the process of stopping her, Commander Root is killed and the mind-wiped Artemis and Butler are saved from her bio-bomb. The two have their memories restored from the medallion, and Mulch, Artemis, Holly, and Butler thwart Opal Koboi yet again.

==== Artemis Fowl and the Lost Colony ====
Artemis Fowl and the Lost Colony involves bringing the demon island Hybras back from "Limbo" with the help of N°1, a powerful demon warlock. Artemis, Butler, Holly, Mulch, and Foaly reunite after Artemis encounters a demon from the island Hybras, and Holly and Mulch capture the pixie fish smuggler Doodah Day. Foaly tells them after the Battle of Taillte, the war for land against fairy and human, the demon fairy family sent themselves out of time on the island Hybras, and that on their island their time can be anything on ours. The time spell is crumbling, and demons are appearing on earth without warning. If the humans discover the demons, they will inevitably uncover the rest of the fairies. Artemis and his friends go after the demon warlock N°1, who is kidnapped by child prodigy Minerva Paradizo. Minerva intends to present N°1 to humans as a ploy to win the Nobel Prize. She eventually lets go of her project and joins them after Billy Kong, her security guard, turns against her in her own home. Artemis, Holly, N°1, and Qwan, another demon warlock, travel through time and space to Hybras, which Artemis had planned to get rid of with the live bomb Billy Kong had given Holly to annihilate the demons in Hybras, due to his belief that his brother was killed by a gang of demons. In Hybras, the pack leader Leon Abbot (N'Zall) and his army of demons fight Artemis and his friends. They knock Leon unconscious and create a bomb explosion powerful enough for them to use its energy – converting it into enough magic to send the island back to earth, where three years have passed because of the time spell. Unfortunately, Holly and Artemis find out that in the process of being brought back in time, they have swapped an eye. Artemis now has one hazel eye and one blue eye. Same with Holly. The book ends with Holly finding out that Mulch has recruited Doodah Day, and Artemis finds out that he is the brother of toddlers.

==== Artemis Fowl and the Time Paradox ====
Artemis's mother, Angeline Fowl, becomes ill with Spelltropy, and the only cure lies in the brain fluids of the silky sifaka lemur, the last of which Artemis sold to a group named the Extinctionists when he was 10 to procure money to fund the expedition to search for his father. N°1 sends Artemis and Holly to the past, where Artemis must battle his former self to recover the last silky sifaka lemur before the younger Artemis kills it in a business transaction with Damon Kronski, the leader of the Extinctionists. When Artemis almost dies, a relieved Holly kisses him but turns neutral once Artemis admits he lied to her regarding the disease his mother "got from Holly". Things get more complicated when Opal Koboi is revealed to be controlling the Extinctionists and feeding on the brain fluids of many extremely rare animals. These fluids grant her special abilities and extraordinary prowess in certain fields (particularly the magical). The chase finally leads to the past and future Artemises reaching an agreement, whereupon Artemis and Holly are teleported to the future, while past Artemis is mind-wiped. Near to the ending, Opal is revealed to have possessed Angeline Fowl. At the close of the book, past Artemis wakes from a dream with thoughts of fairies, which suggests that Artemis's time travel was the catalyst for his kidnapping scheme in Artemis Fowl.

==== Artemis Fowl and the Atlantis Complex ====
Artemis contracts Atlantis Complex, a fairy condition resembling a combination of obsessive-compulsive disorder, extreme paranoia, and multiple personality disorder. This was brought on by Artemis stealing fairy magic from the time tunnel. This results in the debut of Orion Fowl, his alter ego (in Greek mythology, Orion is Artemis's enemy). The story follows Turnball Root, the criminal brother of Julius Root, as he breaks out of jail and sends probes to destroy his enemies, including Artemis, his fairy friends, and Butler, whom Artemis sent away due to his Atlantis Complex induced paranoia. After Butler, Artemis, and his fairy friends reunite, they hunt down Turnball, tracking him with a computer orb connected to the probes that Artemis found underwater, and find out that Turnball has kidnapped demon warlock N°1 to force him to reverse the aging of Turnball's wife, Leonor. In the end, Leonor and Turnball are killed in an explosion of a shuttle Leonor drives, to fulfill her last wish – to fly once again – and Artemis is sent to a fairy clinic to be cured of Atlantis Complex.

==== Artemis Fowl and the Last Guardian ====
The final book of the original series, Artemis Fowl and the Last Guardian, was released on 10 July 2012. Opal Koboi opens the Berserker's Gate, a portal located on the Fowl Estate, in which dwell the spirits of fairy soldiers, the last victims of the Battle of Taillte, the final blow in the war that sent the Fairy People underground. Artemis, after his last session of being cured of Atlantis Complex, rushes to stop her along with Holly Short and Butler. They fail, and Opal opens the first gate, which releases the spirits of the warriors into the living world. The warriors begin to possess other people and animals around them, including corpses, animals, Juliet Butler, and Artemis's toddler brothers, Myles and Beckett. After escaping Opal and the possessed beings, they attempt to stop Opal from opening the second gate, which will unleash the power of Danu destroying every human on the surface. While doing so, they (reluctantly) battle Artemis's possessed toddler brother Myles, who reveals to them Opal's plan after the fairy warrior spirit left his body. Artemis and his friends fail to destroy the second gate with a laser he created, and Mulch saves them from possessed pirate corpses, causing the spirits of fairy warriors to leave their bodies to the afterlife. They then enter Fowl Manor, where Artemis decides to sacrifice himself in order to stop Opal from opening the second gate. Foaly sends the clone of Opal that she created in the 4th book, and using her hand he is able to make the clone close the gates since the magic recognizes the clone's DNA as Opal's. All the fairies in the circle are drawn to the afterlife, and as Artemis has one of Holly's eyes from book five, Artemis is also sent to the afterlife. However, Artemis's humanity and sheer willpower enables his spirit to stay on Earth. Foaly prepares a clone of Artemis, which is taken to the now overgrown gate six months after Artemis's death. Artemis's spirit then takes control of the clone and he is alive once more. His eye color is now back to normal, with two blue eyes.

=== The Fowl Twins ===
The Artemis Fowl series was followed by a spin-off sequel series, called The Fowl Twins, centered around the characters of Myles and Beckett Fowl, Artemis's younger twin brothers. The first book in the series was released on 5 November 2019.

==== The Fowl Twins Deny All Charges ====
The Fowl Twins Deny All Charges is the second book in the series, and was released on 20 October 2020.

==== The Fowl Twins Get What They Deserve ====
The Fowl Twins Get What They Deserve is the third book in the series, and was released on 19 October 2021.

=== Other works ===
Artemis Fowl: The Seventh Dwarf is a short story written for World Book Day set between the first and second books.

The Artemis Fowl Files is a companion book to the series published 4 October 2004, which included The Seventh Dwarf and other stories. it also includes bonus material such as Artemis Fowl's School Report, exclusive interviews with Artemis, Butler, Holly, Root, Mulch, Foaly and Colfer, and text from the Fairy People's book to translate.

Two graphic novels adaptations exist, the first adapted by Andrew Donkin with the art by Giovanni Rigano.

- Artemis Fowl: The Graphic Novel is a graphic novel adaptation of the first book, and was published on 2 October 2007.
- Artemis Fowl and the Arctic Incident: The Graphic Novel, an adaptation of the second book, was released 11 August 2009.
- Artemis Fowl and the Eternity Code: The Graphic Novel, an adaptation of the third book was released 9 July 2013.
- Artemis Fowl and the Opal Deception: The Graphic Novel, an adaption of the fourth book, was released 15 July 2014.

A second graphic novel adaptation was Michael Moreci and drawn by Stephen Gilpin.

Electronic Arts has brought the first six books in the series to the Nintendo DS and Nintendo DSi as parts in its Flips kids' range, which was released on 4 December 2009.

The audiobooks were narrated by Nathaniel Parker. Adrian Dunbar and Enn Reitel narrated certain versions from different audiobook companies.

=== Future ===
In November 2020, Eoin Colfer indicated interest in bringing the franchise to another medium, such as a musical. In November 2021, Colfer revealed he had thought about writing a "superviolent" follow-up to the Artemis Fowl series inspired by Old Man Logan, following an older Artemis as he becomes a magnate and exploring his and Holly's relationship. In December 2021, Colfer also expressed interest in writing a book about Mulch Diggums as a private investigator, a concept first explored in The Lost Colony, saying "I never say never" regarding a potential return at some point in the future to him writing novels set in the Fowl universe.

== Characters ==
=== Artemis Fowl ===
Artemis Fowl II uses his intelligence to build his family fortune through crime. This stems from his family, who have been criminals for generations. Artemis is cold, cynical, and often outright ruthless in his manipulation of people for his own ends. Following his father's presumed death at the hands of the Russian Mafia, and his mother's subsequent descent into madness, Artemis stopped attending his boarding school, assumed control of the Fowl criminal empire, and embarked on a crime spree to restore the family fortune and fund Arctic expeditions to rescue his father. His investigation into the supernatural eventually leads him into contact with the People in the first book. Due to a strict upbringing, and a lack of any intellectual equals to ground him, Artemis is socially awkward, his best friend and bodyguard Butler being one of the few individuals whom Artemis trusts. He is very pale with raven-black hair and blue eyes. In The Lost Colony, Holly Short and he switch eyes, leaving him with one blue eye and one hazel eye. Artemis is famed for his intelligence; he claims to have the "highest IQ tested in Europe", but is also known for a lack of coordination and athletic ability. Throughout the series, he learns profound morals from the Fairy People and becomes more compassionate and trustworthy, but still maintains much of his intelligence. Because of the time travel in The Lost Colony, his legal age is older than his real age.

=== Domovoi Butler ===
Butler is the Fowl family's loyal manservant and Artemis's bodyguard and friend, accompanying him around the world on his adventures. He is the third-most skilled martial artist on the planet (the first is a monk on a Pacific Island and the second is his uncle), a formidable marksman and firearms expert, and has immense experience of the criminal underworld, often providing help to Artemis through his many contacts. His first name is Domovoi though no one knows that besides Artemis and his little sister, Juliet, who appears in most of the books. Butler is rendered dead temporarily in The Eternity Code, but is rescued by the ingenuity of his principal and the healing powers of Holly Short. Butler's favored weapon is a treasured SIG Sauer P226 pistol chambered in 9mm Parabellum, but he often must resort to other fairy weaponry for his tasks. Due to his healing in The Eternity Code, his body is older than he should be.

=== Holly Short ===
Holly is a determined, forthright elf and the only female captain of LEPrecon, the reconnaissance division of the LEP. Holly is three feet tall and slender, with nut-brown skin and auburn hair. In the first book, she is kidnapped by Artemis and held for ransom, but over the course of the series they slowly become friends--and by the end of the series, best friends. She helped Artemis save the world on numerous occasions. Holly holds a disregard for the rules and orders given to her. She is also one of the best pilots in LEPrecon.

=== Foaly ===
Foaly is a centaur, technical genius, and computer geek. He works for the LEP, the fairy authorities, and is in charge of preventing humankind from discovering the fairy civilization. His intelligence makes him paranoiac, which causes him to wear a foil hat to "protect him from human mind-probing technology". He designs most of the weaponry, wings, and other technical gadgets that the LEP use, such as the 'Iris Cam'. His sarcasm and talkative nature often annoy LEP officers, though his greatest pleasure outside of his engineering is aggravating the notoriously bad-tempered Commander Root. He 'hitches' or marries a centaur named Caballine in The Lost Colony while Captain Short and Artemis are in Limbo, and apparently has foals. He has a rivalry with Opal Koboi, which she sporadically mentions throughout her dialogue.

=== Opal Koboi ===
Opal is a deranged, paranoid genius pixie whose dream is world domination and the destruction of the LEP. A prodigy, she built Koboi Laboratories, a technology company, which she used to crush her father's company out of spite. Opal is featured in several of the Artemis Fowl books as the main antagonist. She detests Foaly, as he won a science competition in college over her, and she believes the judges chose Foaly instead just because he was male. However, she became Artemis' archenemy after he and Holly foiled her plans numerous times. In The Opal Deception, she creates a clone of herself to escape imprisonment, later killing Julius Root rather violently with a bomb, and framing Holly Short. In the past, it is revealed that she harvested a silky silfaka lemur's brain fluid as one of the steps to achieving world domination. She later kills her past self created in The Time Paradox, creating a paradox. Opal is later killed by Oro Shaydova, the leader of fairy soldiers killed in the battle of Taillte.

=== Mulch Diggums ===
Mulch is a kleptomaniac, criminal dwarf who has been involved in crime for four centuries. When considered with the average dwarf lifespan, he is not that old. He once was a mining dwarf, but later decided that stealing from Mud Men (humans) suited him much better. Because he has stolen from Mud Men, Mulch no longer has the significant magic powers of the usual fairy, but he has retained some aspect of the gift of tongues as "all tongues are based on Gnommish if you trace them back far enough", and has even shown his ability to speak 'American dog' in The Arctic Incident. He insists that humans were stealing from fairy-kind and the earth and that he is simply taking them back or repossessing the items. In the early books, he assisted the LEP against Artemis Fowl, although later, he sides with Artemis Fowl. Eventually, when the fairies and Artemis are on stable ground, he joins forces with the Fairy People on many adventures, acting as an LEP helper at the beginning of The Time Paradox.

=== Julius Root ===
Julius Root commanded the LEPrecon and was in charge of all activities related to the tracking of those who leave fairy civilization, to prevent them making contact with humans. Known for his ruddy face (hence his nickname, "Beetroot") and extremely short temper, he led the LEPrecon on missions until Koboi killed him with an explosive in The Opal Deception and framed Holly Short. He usually despised Holly's disregard for rules and orders. However, Root also seems to have been a lot like Holly Short when he was younger (Eternity Code states that Holly Short had recently beat the speed record that had been set 80 years prior by Julius Root). Julius Root hates when Foaly called him by his first name. Julius Root also had a brother, Turnball Root, the main antagonist in The Atlantis Complex.

=== Briar Cudgeon ===
A minor antagonist in the first novel, Cudgeon was an ex-LEP lieutenant who was humiliated by Commander Julius Root and had the misfortune of having a terrible-looking face, the result of illegal mind-boosting liquid colliding with tranquilizer Julius Root used in the first novel. Looking for revenge, Cudgeon teams up with Opal Koboi in The Arctic Incident. Their plan suddenly goes wrong when LEP technical consultant Foaly inserts a video in Koboi Laboratories to expose Briar Cudgeon's confessions to treachery to Opal. Enraged by this, Opal attacks Cudgeon, and in the struggle, they smash into a pipeline containing reignited plasma, which violently fries Cudgeon to death, and gruesomely incapacitates Opal.

== Themes ==
Colfer has said in interviews that the series is about Artemis growing up. Themes of greed, trust, and the difference between good and evil are also present in the books. Colfer wanted to end the series with a simple choice between being kind without reward or being unkind for a reward.

== Critical reception ==
Colfer summed up the first book as "Die Hard with fairies." Critics call the series "the new Harry Potter," although Colfer stated in 2001 that he disagreed. Kate Kellaway of The Observer called the first book "a smart, amusing one-off. It flashes with hi-tech invention – as if Colfer were as much an inspired boffin as a writer". Time magazine said of the book, "Artemis Fowl is pacy, playful, and very funny, an inventive mix of myth and modernity, magic and crime", while The New York Times Book Review said that "Colfer has done enormously, explosively well" in writing a book that could be accurately described as "Die Hard with fairies".

The Guardian gave a favorable review to The Atlantis Complex, the seventh book in the series, but noted "it is also clearly a prelude to the grand finale."

The Last Guardian, the eighth and final novel of the series, received favorable reviews from Kirkus Reviews, Entertainment Weekly, and The Irish Times, also winning the 2012 Irish Book Award in the "Irish Children's Book – Senior" category.

In 2010 Artemis Fowl was selected by readers as the favorite Puffin Books title of all time, which Colfer described as his "proudest professional moment."

== Adaptations ==
=== Film adaptation ===
In 2001 plans were announced for a film adaptation of the series. Miramax Films was named as purchasing the film rights with Lawrence Guterman signed to direct. In 2003 Colfer stated that a screenplay had been finalized and that casting was due to start the same year but expressed skepticism over whether or not this would come to pass, though Colfer revealed the film was in pre-production. The film remained in development and was assumed to be in development hell until 2011, when it was reported that Jim Sheridan was interested in directing the movie, with Saoirse Ronan attached to portray Holly Short.

In July 2013, Walt Disney Pictures announced that an Artemis Fowl film covering the events of the first and second novels of the series would be produced by Disney and The Weinstein Company, with the screenplay by Michael Goldenberg. Robert De Niro and Jane Rosenthal signed onto the project as executive producers.

In September 2015, Variety reported that Kenneth Branagh had been hired to direct the film for Disney, with Irish playwright Conor McPherson as screenwriter and Judy Hofflund as an executive producer. Eoin Colfer confirmed this in a video to Artemis Fowl Confidential, and spoke with RTÉ Radio 1 about meeting Branagh several times to discuss this prior to the announcement. On 12 September 2017, Disney announced that the film adaptation would be released on 9 August 2019. It was also announced to be based on the first two books in the series.

It was announced on 11 October 2017 that Disney removed Harvey Weinstein as the producer of the film as well as terminating its production with The Weinstein Company following a sexual misconduct controversy involving Weinstein. On 20 December 2017, it was announced that Irish newcomer Ferdia Shaw had been cast as Artemis Fowl II, alongside Judi Dench as Commander Root, Josh Gad as Mulch Diggums, Lara McDonnell as Captain Holly Short, and Nonso Anozie as Butler. Principal photography began in March 2018 with filming in England, Northern Ireland, and Ho Chi Minh City.

In May 2019, the film's originally scheduled release date of 9 August 2019 was delayed by Walt Disney Studios Motion Pictures to 29 May 2020, as part of a change to their release schedule, while Colin Farrell was announced to be portraying Artemis Fowl I. The film was pulled completely on 3 April 2020 due to the COVID-19 pandemic, and instead debuted on Disney+, 12 June 2020.

Upon the film's release, the film was criticised for the removal of the character arcs of both Artemis Fowl II and Holly Short from the book series in the film, with Fowl switched from antagonist to protagonist, and Short being relegated from protagonist to supporting character. McDonnell's casting was also criticised as whitewashing due to Short being physically described in the book series as having nut-brown skin of a coffee complexion. The casting of Nonso Anozie as Butler was also criticised for several reasons: that the character is described as Eurasian who can pass as Japanese and Russian in the book series, and that the character's physical description of terrifying anyone in his presence, combined with his backstory of his family having served the Fowl family for centuries and Anozie's casting, embodies several stereotypes of African Americans, in particular the "scary black man" and "black servant" tropes.

On 26 May 2023, the film was removed from Disney+ as part of a Disney+ and Hulu purge.

=== Television series ===
In October 2026, it was announced that an animated TV show based on the series, named Artemis Fowl: The Animated Series, had been greenlit for the Disney Channel and Disney+.

=== Musical theatre adaptation ===
In 2025, it was announced that a musical adaptation of the novels would premiere in London, with Colfer writing the libretto and Liam Bates composing the music. Colfer had wanted for a long time to adapt the novel series into a musical, theatre being a particular interest of his from a very young age.
