= Airman (novel) =

2008 Eoin Colfer novel

- Author: Eoin Colfer
- Language: English
- Genre: Fantasy, historical
- Publisher: Hyperion Books for Children
- Publication date: 19 December 2007 (United States); 3 January 2008 (Ireland, United Kingdom); 5 February 2008 (Australia)
- Publication place: Ireland
- Media type: Print (hardback)
- Pages: 412 pp (first edition, hardback)
- ISBN: 1-4231-0750-0 (first edition, hardback)

Airman, by Eoin Colfer, is a best-selling historical adventure novel set in the 19th century. It was released in the UK, Ireland and US in January 2008. The novel was shortlisted for the 2009 Carnegie Medal.

Colfer was inspired to write the book after a frightening skydiving experience. He combined this with his childhood observation that the Saltee Islands would make an excellent prison.

Most of the story is fictional. The Saltee Islands have been uninhabited since the 19th century and all of the main characters in the story are fictional.

== Plot summary ==
The story opens at the 1878 Paris World's Fair, where Declan Broekhart and his wife attend a demonstration of a new hot air balloon. During a flight with Victor Vigny, the balloon's inventor, they are shot at from the ground. During the forced landing, Conor Broekhart is born, flying over Paris.

In the 1890s, Conor and his family live on the Saltee Islands off the Irish coast, under the rule of King Nicholas Trudeau, who is passionate about adapting the islands to the industrial age. During an accidental fire, Conor and Isabella become trapped on a tower roof. To escape, he saves Isabella, the king's daughter, who is a year older than him, using a flag turned into a makeshift sail. In recognition of his bravery, the king knights him as "Sir".

As he grows up, Conor is taught by Victor Vigny, a close French friend of King Nicholas, affectionately called "Good King Nick". He learns fencing and collaborates with Victor on designing gliders and flying machines. A joke from Victor leads Conor to confess his love for Isabella, fearing the Danish Prince might steal her away (a misunderstanding Isabella had cleverly orchestrated by omitting to tell the prince is a child). After this confession, Conor retreats to a perch under a turret's eaves. There, lost in thought, he sees Marshal Bonvilain armed with Victor's personal pistol. Following him, Conor witnesses the murder of the king and Victor, staged by Bonvilain to look like the Frenchman committed the crime. Trying to avenge them, Conor grabs the pistol, but Bonvilain, protected by chainmail hidden under his tunic, survives and strangles Conor into unconsciousness.

When he wakes, Conor is in a dungeon where two guards beat him, dress him in a uniform, and mark his face with gunpowder and his arm with a quill. They place a "madman's cage" on his head to prevent him from speaking before releasing him. Bonvilain personally reveals his scheme: Victor was a French spy who killed the king, and Conor, whose young mind was corrupted, was manipulated into helping. Isabella, now under Bonvilain's control, will spend her life crushing rebels blamed for her father's death, allowing Bonvilain to carry out his dirty work. Declan Broekhart, deceived by Bonvilain's lies, tries to kill his son (whom he does not recognize), believing Conor was complicit in the murders. Bonvilain thus wins Declan's loyalty and mentally breaks Conor, who comes to believe his father hates him and wants him dead.

Conor is transferred to a prison on the Saltee Islands, where inmates mine diamonds. There, he meets Arthur Billtoe, a guard personally assigned to him by Bonvilain. Renamed Conor Finn, he shares a cell with Linus Wynter, a blind musician. On his first day in the diving bell, Otto Malarkey, a bandit and leader of the Rams, is tasked with beating him daily with three pounds of blows for several weeks. Knocked out, Conor is returned to his cell, where Linus, sensing his true identity during a fevered delirium, advises him to abandon his old name, truly become Conor Finn, and kill Otto. The next day, armed with a telescopic trident turned into a foil, Conor duels Otto, defeats him, but spares his life. Back in the cell, Linus reveals he is actually a spy for King Nicholas, sent to investigate prisoner treatment.

The following day, Conor forms an alliance with Otto by sharing the beatings, agreeing to join the Rams for protection in exchange for fencing lessons for Otto. That night, he finds his cell empty—Linus has been "released", a euphemism for executed.

Two years later, in 1894, Conor is now a respected prisoner thanks to his alliance with Otto and his membership in the Rams. He trades inventions for favors, proposing to Arthur Billtoe the idea of growing sueda salsa plants to feed prisoners and creating explosive balloons filled with fireworks for Queen Isabella's coronation and Queen Victoria's visit. With one final invention—a 12-shot revolver deemed impossible—Conor secures bed sheets, which he assembles into a parachute. Cleverly, he escapes the prison by clinging to a balloon during the coronation, crash-landing on Queen Victoria's ship. After escaping, he visits Otto Malarkey's brother, who lends him money to fund his plan.

With this funding, Conor moves into Victor's old laboratory near Kilmore in a Martello tower. From there, he uses a wind tunnel and a glider he designed to return to the Saltee Islands and recover the seven diamond sacks hidden by the Rams in the salsa plants. He retrieves six, but on his second trip, he is confronted by Arthur Billtoe, whom he knocks out, and then spotted by Lieutenant Pike, tasked by the Rams with overseeing a bribe involving mooring a skiff each night in case of wind. By chance, Conor meets Linus Wynter in a village inn near the lab. Linus, truly released thanks to an order signed by King Nicholas before his death, reunites with Conor, and they decide to settle in the lab.

However, Conor’s final trip does not go as planned. Ambushed by Billtoe, Pike, and their accomplices, and spotted by palace guards, he survives. He goes to Great Saltee to find his parents but is heartbroken to see them playing games with their new son, Sean, Conor's brother. That night, an altercation and Billtoe's injury prompt Bonvilain to investigate, discovering Conor's hideout. With help from his ally Sultan Arif, Bonvilain enters the tower and sends a message to Conor via a wounded Linus—who narrowly escaped assassination thanks to Sultan's intervention. Bonvilain plans a dinner to poison the queen, Declan, and his wife, whom he sees as leaders of an imminent revolt.

Learning of the plot, Conor decides to take a final risk. He builds a working airplane—the first motorized flying machine—to travel from the lab to the Saltee Islands. When soldiers shoot it down, despite Catherine's pleas from Bonvilain's tower. After this incident, Bonvillain, after Isabella stripped him of his marshal title, offers to drink a glass in honor of Conor. He drinks half of it just enough to endanger but not kill him, prompting the guests to drink as well. However, when the others are about to drink, Conor who used his glider to escape from the crashing plane, crashes into the banquet hall. The ensuing confrontation reveals his identity to his parents and ends with Bonvilain's death.

In the end, Isabella repeals Bonvilain's decrees, and Conor leaves for Glasgow to continue his studies. Before departing, he shares a kiss with Isabella, marking a new chapter in their lives.

== References in other works ==
The character of Otto Malarkey later appears in all three books of Colfer's W.A.R.P. trilogy as a gangster in Victorian London, initially as an adversary of protagonists Chevie and Riley, and later as a major supporting character and ally.

== Film adaptation ==
A film adaptation for the book utilizing motion-capture was announced in September 2008. It was set to be directed by Gil Kenan and produced by Robert Zemeckis through his joint venture with Walt Disney Pictures, ImageMovers Digital. In October 2009, Ann Peacock signed on as screenwriter. No further development has been reported.

== Release details ==
- 2008, US, Hyperion Books for Children ISBN 1-4231-0750-0, January 2008, Hardback
- January 2008 source Colfer Confidential
