= Eoin Colfer =

Irish children's books author (born 1965)

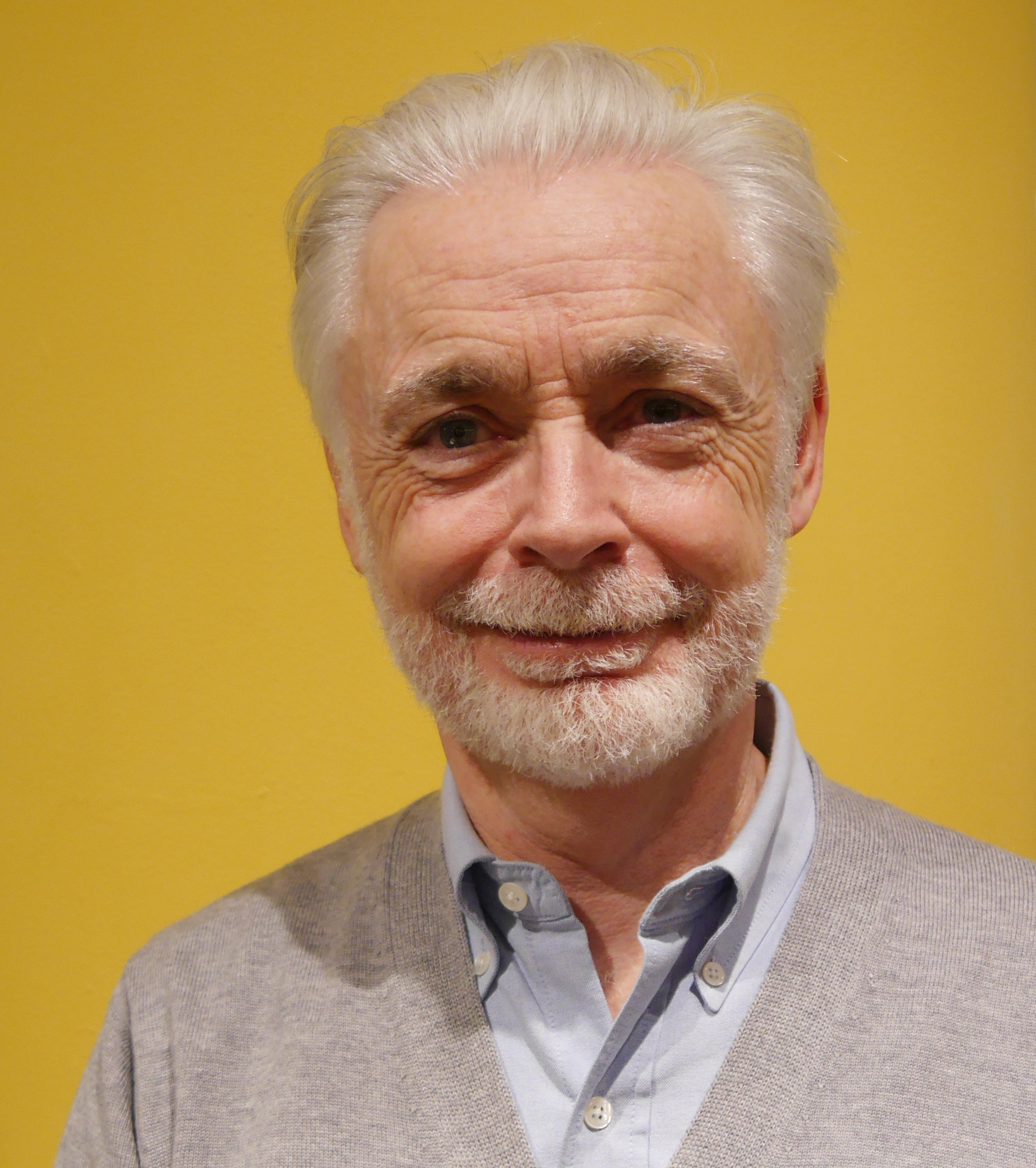
- Colfer at Waterstones London in 2023
- Born: 14 May 1965 (age 61); Wexford, Ireland
- Education: Trinity College Dublin
- Occupation: Writer
- Writing career
- Years active: 1998–present
- Period: Modern
- Genres: Children's fantasy, science fiction and adventure novels
- Notable work: Artemis Fowl series
- Website: www.eoincolfer.com

Signature
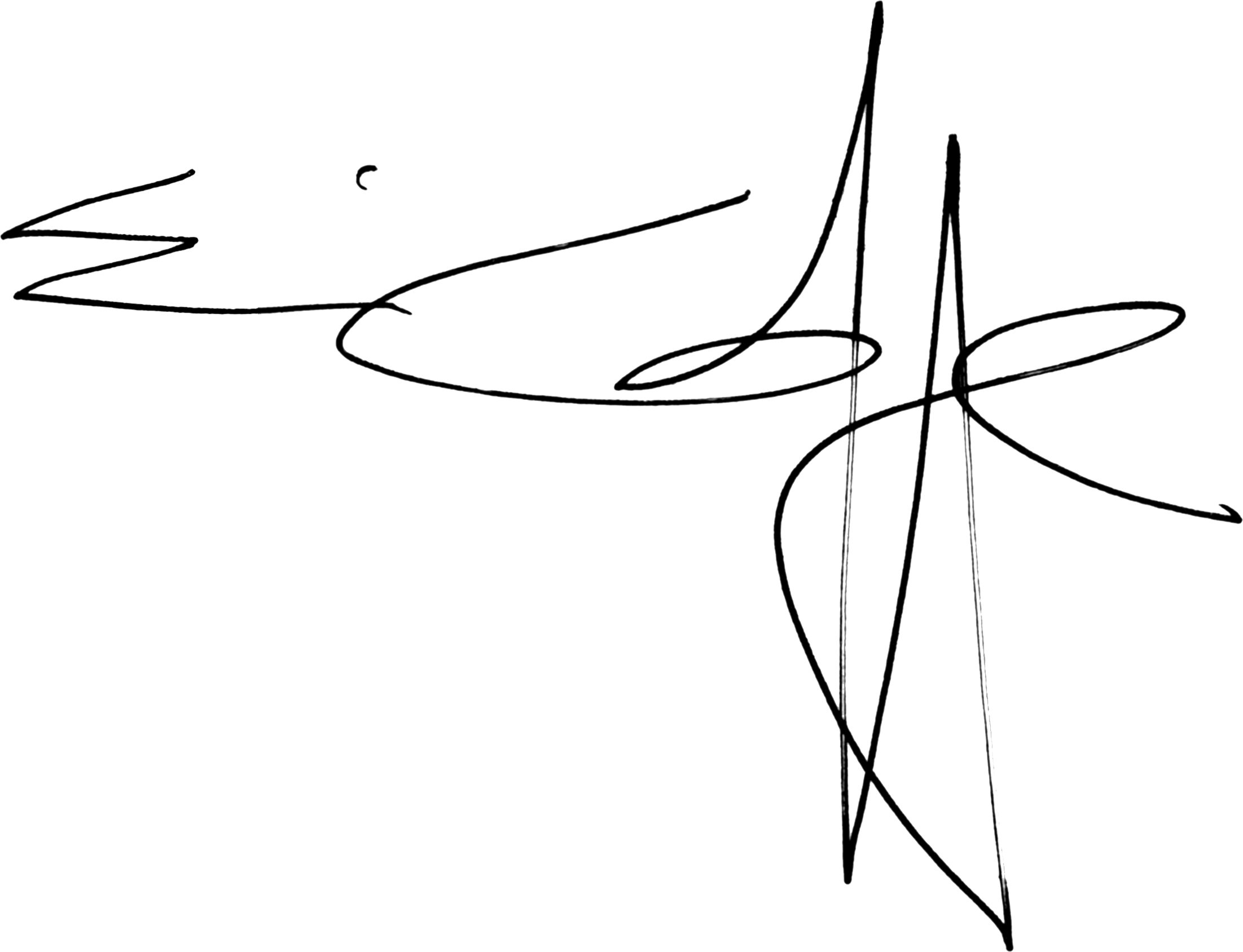

Eoin Colfer (/ˈoʊ.ɪn/; born 14 May 1965) is an Irish writer of children's literature. He is best known for being the author of the Artemis Fowl series, a set of eleven fantasy books. As of 2013, the novels had sold more than 21 million copies worldwide and had been translated into 44 languages, making them one of the best-selling series of all time. In a 2010 public poll, readers also voted Artemis Fowl as their favorite Puffin Books title of all time.

Colfer worked as a primary school teacher before he became a full-time writer. In September 2008, Colfer was commissioned to write the sixth installment of the Hitchhiker's Guide to the Galaxy series, titled And Another Thing ..., which was published in October 2009. In October 2016, in a contract with Marvel Comics, he released Iron Man: The Gauntlet. He served as Laureate na nÓg (Ireland's Children's Laureate) between 2014 and 2016.

== Biography ==
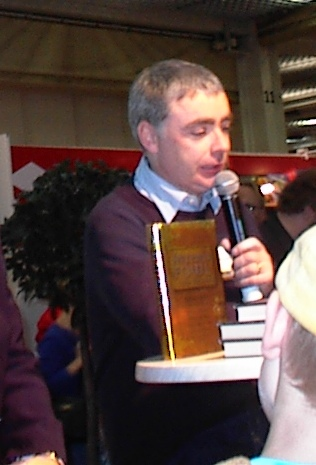
Colfer at the Helsinki Book Fair in 2001

Eoin Colfer was born in Wexford, Ireland. He was one of five siblings. His father was a teacher and historian, and his mother was a drama teacher. From an early age, he developed a love for theatre, describing it as his "first love", and would often enjoy reciting lines with his mother. The very first piece of writing he ever did was a play for a Christmas show. As a child, he worked at the country house Loftus Hall, which later became the inspiration for Fowl Manor, where he washed bottles. He graduated from the University of Dublin with a bachelor's degree in Education. Soon after graduating, Colfer spent four years working in Saudi Arabia, Italy and Tunisia. His travels throughout Europe, as well as his Irish heritage, serve as a basis for many of his earlier stories. He attained worldwide recognition in 2001, when the first Artemis Fowl book became a New York Times Best Seller. Since then, several others of his works have become bestsellers as well. Among his other popular works are Half Moon Investigations, The Wish List, The Supernaturalist, and a series of Eoin Colfer's Legends. In January 2008, Colfer published a book titled Airman, another best-seller. To date, more than half of his books have reached the New York Times list at least once. His books have also received many awards, including the British Children's Book of the Year, The Irish Book Awards Children's Book of the Year and The German Children's Book of the Year 2025.

== Works ==
=== Benny Shaw ===
- 1. Benny and Omar (1998)
- 2. Benny and Babe (1999)

=== O'Brien Flyers ===
Colfer contributed three volumes to this series of books by several writers, for very young readers.

- 1. Going Potty (1999)
- 4. Ed's Funny Feet (2000)
- 7. Ed's Bed (2001)

=== The Fowl Adventures ===
Artemis Fowl

- 1. Artemis Fowl (2001)
- 2. Artemis Fowl and the Arctic Incident (2002)
- 3. Artemis Fowl and the Eternity Code (2003)
- 4. Artemis Fowl and the Opal Deception (2005)
- 5. Artemis Fowl and the Lost Colony (2006)
- 6. Artemis Fowl and the Time Paradox (2008)
- 7. Artemis Fowl and the Atlantis Complex (2010)
- 8. Artemis Fowl and the Last Guardian (2012)

The Fowl Twins

- 1. The Fowl Twins (2019)
- 2. The Fowl Twins Deny All Charges (2020)
- 3. The Fowl Twins Get What They Deserve (2021)

==== Companion books ====
- LEPrecon (short story; 2004)
- Artemis Fowl: The Seventh Dwarf (short story; 2004)
- The Artemis Fowl Files (companion book; 2004)
- Artemis Fowl: The Graphic Novel (2007, revised editions; 2014, 2019)
- Artemis Fowl and the Arctic Incident - The Graphic Novel (2009)
- Artemis Fowl and the Eternity Code - The Graphic Novel (9 July 2013)
- Artemis Fowl and the Opal Deception - Graphic Novel (2014)

Graphic novels are planned for every book in the series.

=== The Supernaturalist ===
- 1. The Supernaturalist (2 May 2004)

Companion books

- The Supernaturalist: The Graphic Novel (10 July 2012)

=== Eoin Colfer's Legends ===
- 1. Legend of Spud Murphy (2005)
- 2. Legend of Captain Crow's Teeth (2006)
- 3. Legend of the Worst Boy in the World (2008)

=== W.A.R.P. (Witness Anonymous Relocation Program) ===
- 1. W.A.R.P. The Reluctant Assassin (11 April 2013)
- 2. W.A.R.P. The Hangman's Revolution (24 June 2014)
- 3. W.A.R.P. The Forever Man (15 September 2015)

=== Half Moon Investigations ===
- 1. Half Moon Investigations (27 March 2006)

=== The Hitchhiker's Guide to the Galaxy ===
The first five novels in the Hitchhiker's "trilogy" were written by Douglas Adams. Adams' widow, Jane Belson, and the literary agency that manages Adams' estate asked Colfer to write another book, as Adams had intended to add to the series, agreeing that the end to the fifth book was "very bleak". Already a fan of the series, Colfer called the opportunity "like suddenly being offered the superpower of your choice ... For years I have been finishing this incredible story in my head and now I have the opportunity to do it in the real world ... It is a gift from the gods. So, thank you Thor and Odin."

- 6. And Another Thing... (2009)

=== Daniel McEvoy ===
- 1. Plugged (1 May 2011)
- 2. Screwed (9 May 2013)

=== Marvel Comics ===
- Iron Man: the Gauntlet (6 October 2016).

=== Doctor Who ===
- A Big Hand For The Doctor (2013)

=== Standalone novels ===
- The Wish List (31 January 2001)
- Click, chapter 3 (1 October 2007)
- Airman (2 January 2008)
- Highfire (28 January 2020) (also titled The Last Dragon on Earth)

=== Children's books ===
- Imaginary Fred (October 2015, with Oliver Jeffers)
- The Dog Who Lost His Bark (2019, with P. J. Lynch)
- Little Big Sister (2023, with Celia Ivey)
- Three Tasks for a Dragon (2023, with P. J. Lynch)

=== Holiday books ===
- Juniper's Christmas (2023)

=== Graphic novels ===
In 2015, it was announced that Colfer was working on an adult graphic novel called Illegal with Andrew Donkin and Giovanni Rigano, the team behind the Artemis Fowl graphic novels. The same team released their second young adult graphic novel called Global on 11 April 2023.

=== Film and TV adaptations ===
In April 2014, principal photography began on a new Irish feature film Poison Pen, the first screenplay from Colfer. The film, a romantic comedy, was filmed on location in Ireland over the next three weeks by the participants on the Filmbase/Staffordshire University MSc in Digital Feature Film Production. The film premiered at the 26th Galway Film Fleadh on 11 July 2014. The film is an eco-friendly production. John Gormley, the former Green Party Minister, was appointed as a Green Production Manager for the production, with a view to minimising the carbon footprint and environmental impact of the film.

On 1 September 2015, Variety reported that Kenneth Branagh had been hired to direct Artemis Fowl for Walt Disney Studios Motion Pictures, with Irish playwright Conor McPherson as screenwriter and Judy Hofflund and Branagh as producers. Colfer confirmed this in a video to Artemis Fowl Confidential, and spoke with RTÉ Radio 1 about meeting Branagh several times to discuss the film prior to the announcement. The film was originally scheduled for release on 9 August 2019 but on 7 May 2019 it was delayed to 29 May 2020. The film was pulled on 3 April 2020 due to the COVID-19 pandemic, and debuted on Disney+ on 12 June 2020 instead of a theatrical release, to overwhelmingly negative reviews.

On 28 August 2020 Colfer's novel Highfire was expected to be adapted into a television series with Nicolas Cage voicing a character and producing the series for Prime Video until, on 7 July 2022, the series was moved to Paramount+.

=== Theatre ===
- Holy Mary (2011)
- The Legend of Captain Crow's Teeth (2012)
- My Real Life (2015)
- The Comeback Vehicle (2019)

=== Musicals ===
- The Lords of Love (2010)
- The Belle Bottoms (2014)
- Noël the Musical (2016)

Cultural offices
Preceded by Niamh Sharkey	Laureate na nÓg; 2014–2016	Succeeded by P. J. Lynch
