= Easter Rising =

1916 armed insurrection in Ireland

Easter Rising Éirí Amach na Cásca
- Part of the Irish revolutionary period
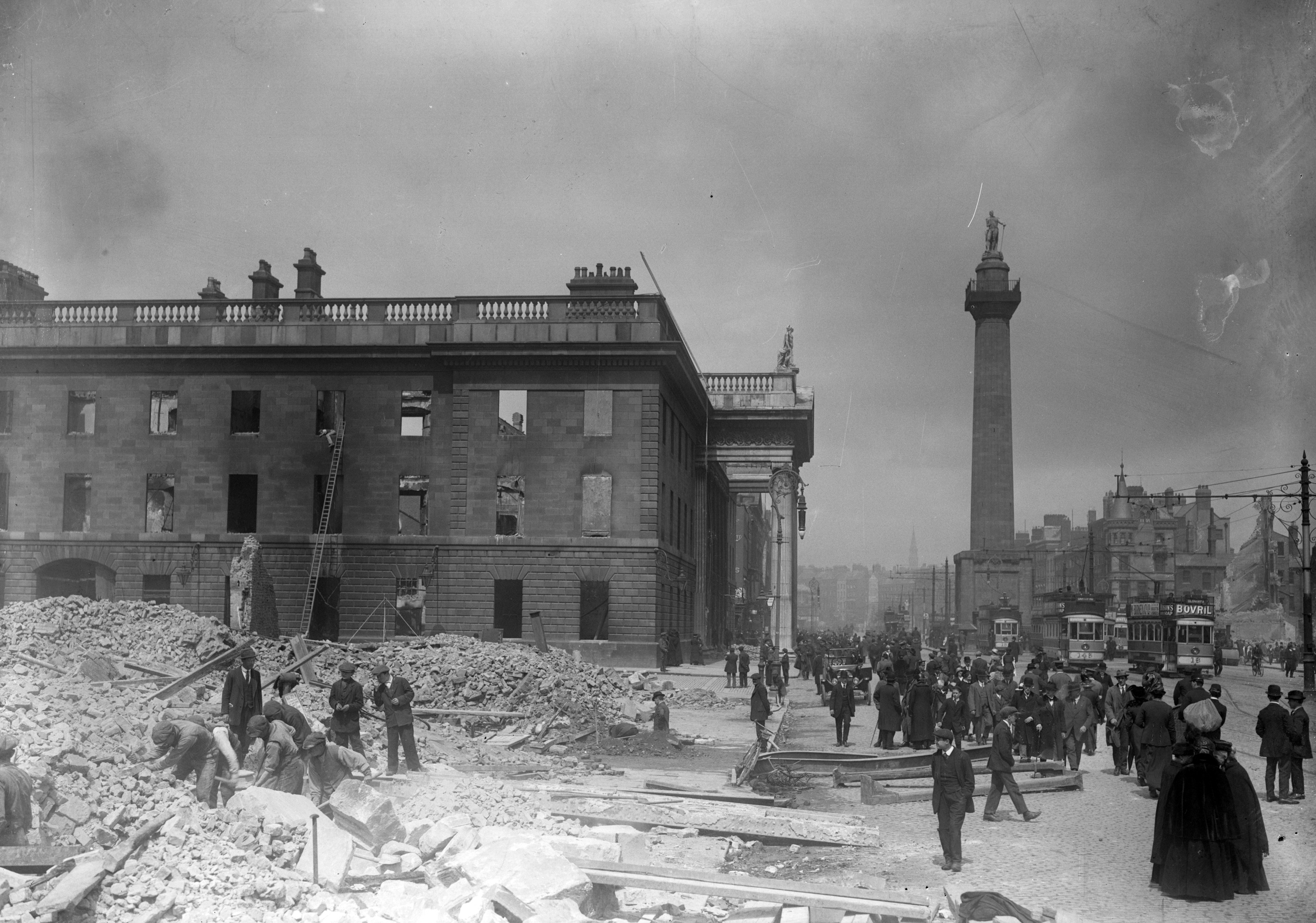
- O'Connell Street, Dublin, after the Rising. The GPO is at left, and Nelson's Pillar at right.
Date	24–29 April 1916
Location	Mostly Dublin; skirmishes in counties Meath, Galway, Louth, Wexford, Cork
Result	Uprising suppressed: Unconditional surrender of rebel forces; Execution of most rebel leaders; Shift of public opinion in favour of independence

Belligerents
Irish Republic	United Kingdom and imperial territories

Commanders and leaders
Patrick Pearse; James Connolly; Tom Clarke; Seán Mac Diarmada; Joseph Plunkett; Éamonn Ceannt; Thomas MacDonagh	H. H. Asquith; Lord Wimborne; Augustine Birrell; Matthew Nathan; Lord French; Lovick Friend; John Maxwell; William Lowe

Units involved
Irish Volunteers; Irish Republican Brotherhood; Irish Citizen Army; Fianna Éireann; Cumann na mBan; Hibernian Rifles	British Army; Royal Irish Constabulary

Strength
1,250 in Dublin; c. 2,000–3,000 Volunteers elsewhere but they took little part in the fighting	16,000 British troops and 1,000 armed RIC in Dublin by the end of the week

Casualties and losses
82 killed; 16 executed; Unknown wounded	143 killed; 397 wounded
- 260 civilians killed; 2,200+ civilians wounded (including unknown number of rebels); Total killed: 485

The Easter Rising (Irish: Éirí Amach na Cásca), also known as the Easter Rebellion, was an armed insurrection in Ireland during Easter Week in April 1916. The Rising was launched by Irish republicans against British rule in Ireland with the aim of establishing an independent Irish Republic while the United Kingdom was fighting the First World War. It was the most significant uprising in Ireland since the rebellion of 1798 and the first armed conflict of the Irish revolutionary period. Sixteen of the Rising's leaders were executed starting in May 1916. The nature of the executions, and subsequent political developments, ultimately contributed to an increase in popular support for Irish independence.

Organised by a seven-man Military Council of the Irish Republican Brotherhood, the Rising began on Easter Monday, 24 April 1916 and lasted for six days. Members of the Irish Volunteers, led by schoolmaster and Irish language activist Patrick Pearse, joined by the smaller Irish Citizen Army of James Connolly and 200 women of Cumann na mBan seized strategically important buildings in Dublin and proclaimed the Irish Republic. The British Army brought in thousands of reinforcements as well as artillery and a gunboat. There was street fighting on the routes into the city centre, where the rebels slowed the British advance and inflicted many casualties. Elsewhere in Dublin, the fighting mainly consisted of sniping and long-range gun battles. The main rebel positions were gradually surrounded and bombarded with artillery. There were isolated actions in other parts of Ireland; Volunteer leader Eoin MacNeill had issued a countermand in a bid to halt the Rising, which greatly reduced the extent of the rebel actions.

With much greater numbers and heavier weapons, the British Army suppressed the Rising. Pearse agreed to an unconditional surrender on Saturday 29 April, although sporadic fighting continued briefly. After the surrender, the country remained under martial law. About 3,500 people were taken prisoner by the British and 1,800 of them were sent to internment camps or prisons in Britain. Most of the leaders of the Rising were executed following courts martial. The Rising brought physical force republicanism back to the forefront of Irish politics, which for nearly fifty years had been dominated by constitutional nationalism. Opposition to the British reaction to the Rising contributed to changes in public opinion and the move toward independence, as shown in the 1918 general election, in which Sinn Féin won 73 of the 105 Irish seats. Sinn Féin convened the First Dáil and declared independence.

Of the 485 people killed, 260 were civilians, 143 were British military and police personnel, and 82 were Irish rebels, including 16 rebels executed for their roles in the Rising. More than 2,600 people were wounded. Many of the civilians were killed or wounded by British artillery fire or were mistaken for rebels. Others were caught in the crossfire during firefights between the British and the rebels. The shelling and resulting fires left parts of central Dublin in ruins.

== Background ==
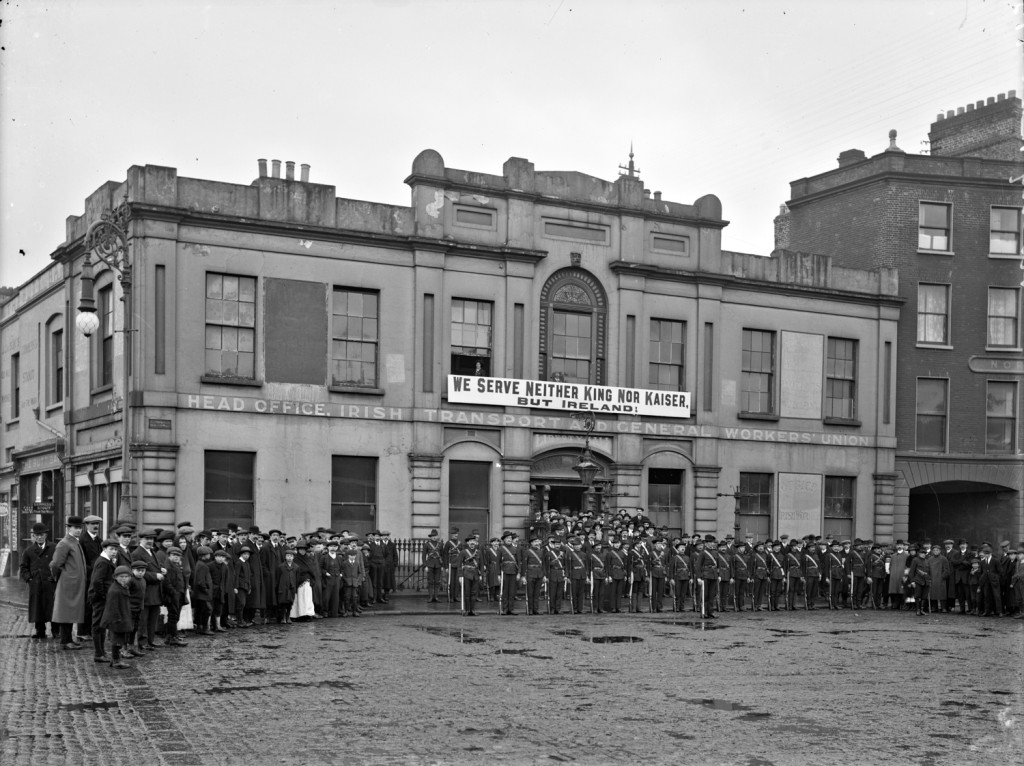
Members of the Irish Citizen Army outside Liberty Hall, under the slogan "We serve neither King nor Kaiser, but Ireland"

The Acts of Union 1800 united the Kingdom of Great Britain and the Kingdom of Ireland as the United Kingdom of Great Britain and Ireland, abolishing the Irish Parliament and giving Ireland representation in the British Parliament. From early on, many Irish nationalists opposed the union and the continued lack of adequate political representation, along with the British government's handling of Ireland and Irish people, particularly the Great Famine. The union was closely preceded by and formed partly in response to the Irish Rebellion of 1798 – whose centenary would prove an influence on the Easter Rising. Three more rebellions ensued: one in 1803, another in 1848 and one in 1867. All were failures.

Opposition took other forms: constitutional (the Repeal Association; the Home Rule League) and social (disestablishment of the Church of Ireland; the Land League). The Irish Home Rule movement sought to achieve self-government for Ireland, within the United Kingdom. In 1886, the Irish Parliamentary Party under Charles Stewart Parnell succeeded in having the First Home Rule Bill introduced in the British parliament, but it was defeated. The Second Home Rule Bill of 1893 was passed by the House of Commons but rejected by the House of Lords.

After the death of Parnell, younger and more radical nationalists became disillusioned with parliamentary politics and turned toward more extreme forms of separatism. The Gaelic Athletic Association, the Gaelic League, and the cultural revival under W. B. Yeats and Augusta, Lady Gregory, together with the new political thinking of Arthur Griffith expressed in his newspaper Sinn Féin and organisations such as the National Council and the Sinn Féin League, led many Irish people to identify with the idea of an independent Gaelic Ireland. (Note: This was sometimes referred to by the generic term Sinn Féin, with the British authorities using it as a collective noun for republicans and advanced nationalists.)

The Third Home Rule Bill was introduced by British Liberal Prime Minister H. H. Asquith in 1912. Irish Unionists, who were overwhelmingly Protestants, opposed it, as they did not want to be ruled by a Catholic-dominated Irish government. Led by Sir Edward Carson and James Craig, they formed the Ulster Volunteers (UVF) in January 1913. The UVF's opposition included arming themselves, in the event that they had to resist by force.

Seeking to defend Home Rule, the Irish Volunteers was formed in November 1913. Although sporting broadly open membership and without avowed support for separatism, the executive branch of the Irish Volunteers – excluding leadership – was dominated by the Irish Republican Brotherhood (IRB) who rose to prominence via the organisation, having restarted recruitment in 1909. These members feared that Home Rule's enactment would result in a broad, seemingly perpetual, contentment with the British Empire. Another militant group, the Irish Citizen Army, was formed by trade unionists as a result of the Dublin Lock-out of that year. The issue of Home Rule appeared to some, as the basis of an "imminent civil war".

On the outbreak of the First World War, the Third Home Rule Bill was enacted, but its implementation was postponed for the war's duration. It was widely believed at the time that the war would not last more than a few months. The Irish Volunteers split: the great majority of its 160,000 members – thereafter known as the National Volunteers – followed John Redmond and supported the British war effort, some 35,000 to 40,000 of them enlisting in the British Army, while the smaller faction of 2,000 to 3,000 – who retained the name – opposed any involvement in the war. The official policy thus became "the abolition of the system of governing Ireland through Dublin Castle and the British military power and the establishment of a National Government in its place"; the Volunteers believed that "England's difficulty" was "Ireland's opportunity".

== Planning the Rising ==
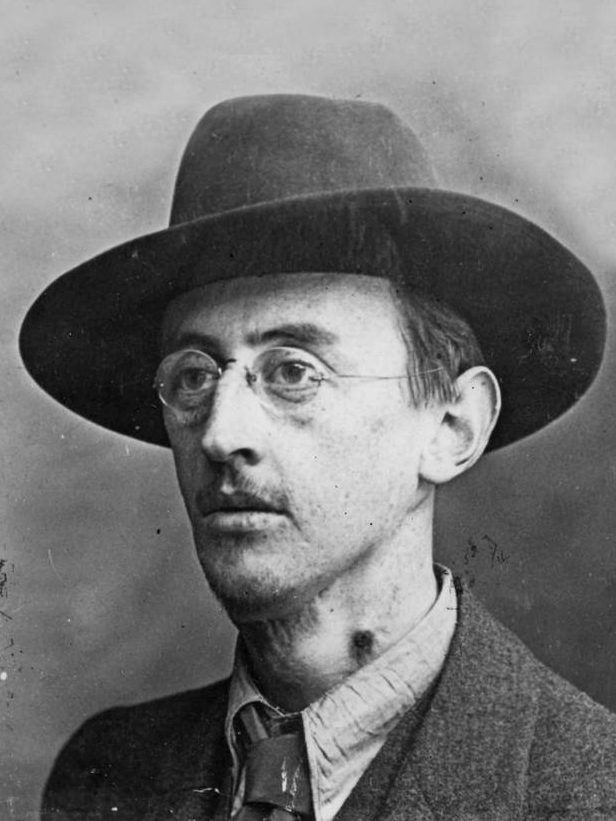
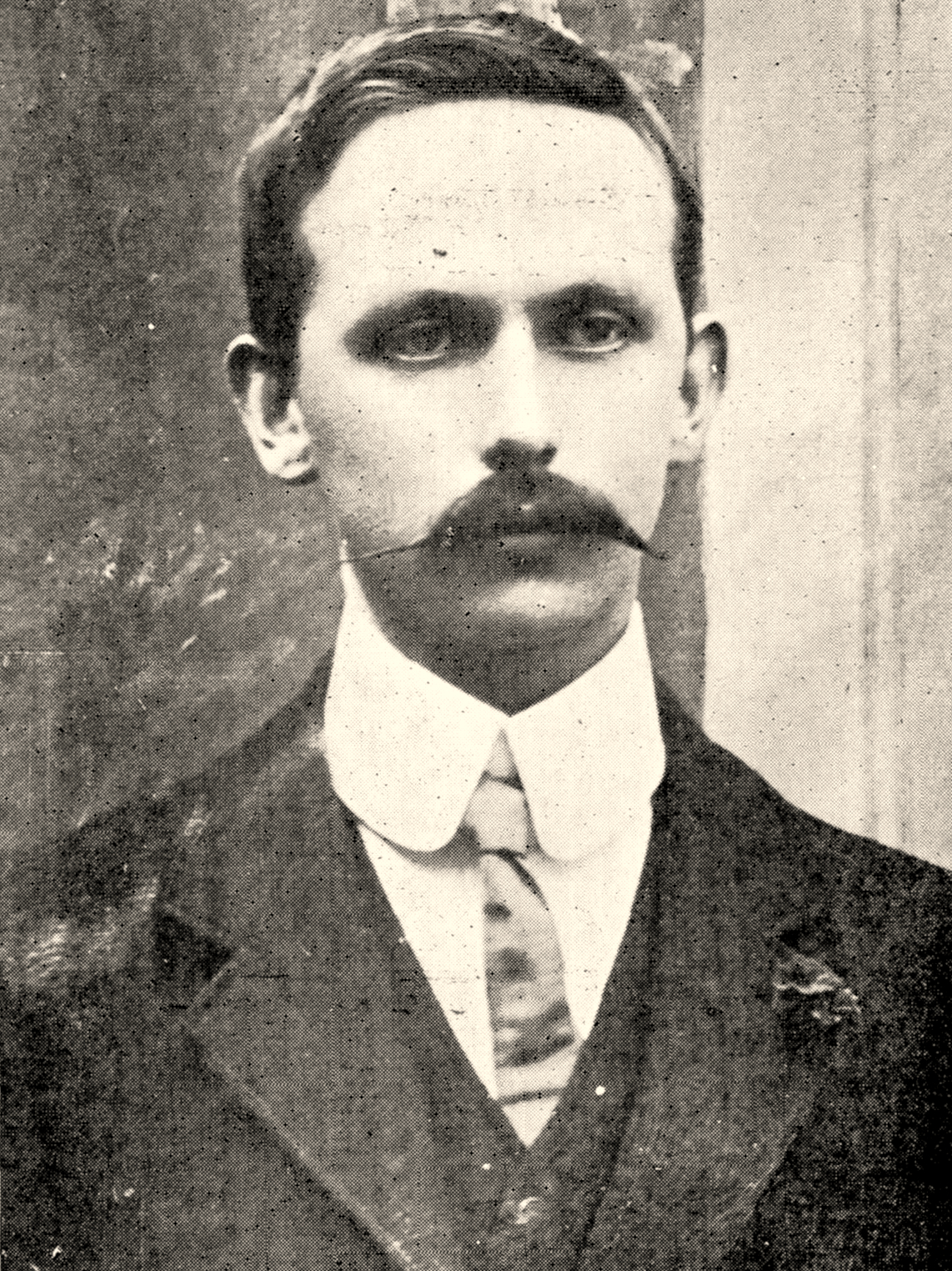
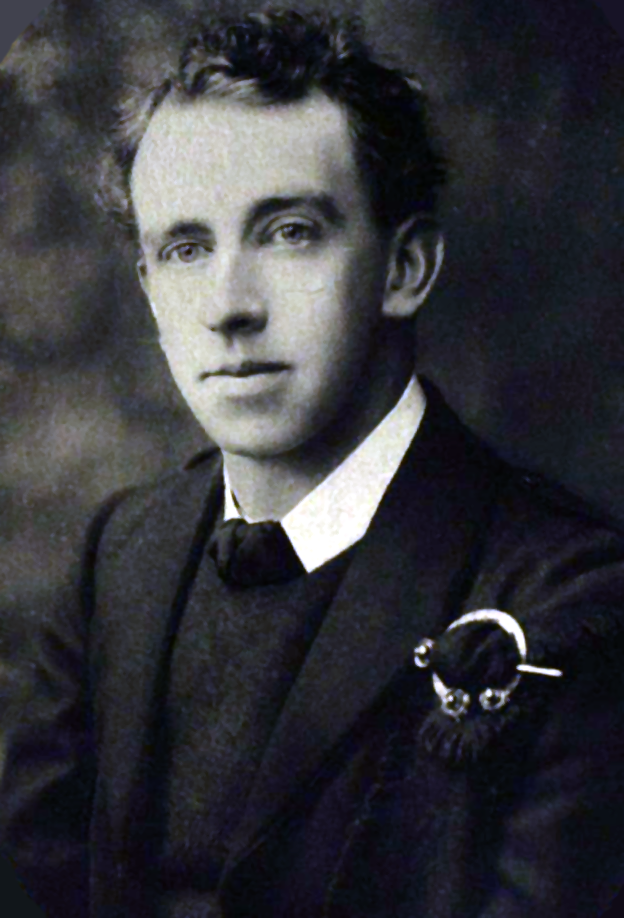
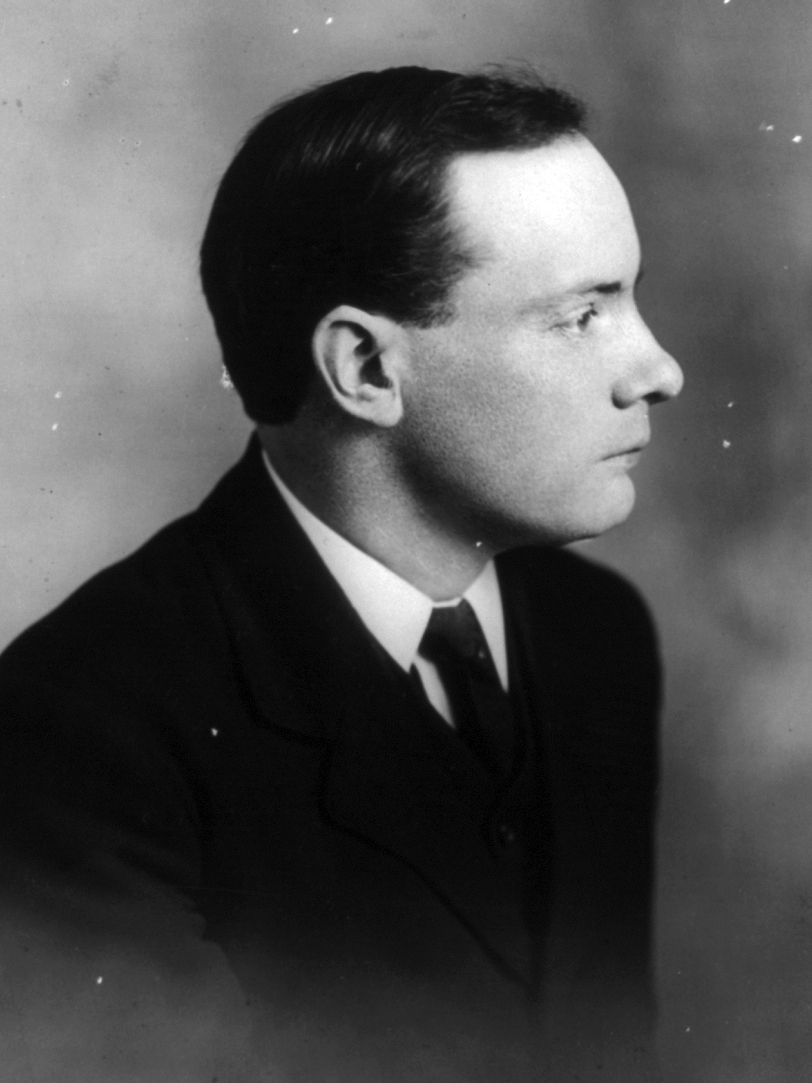
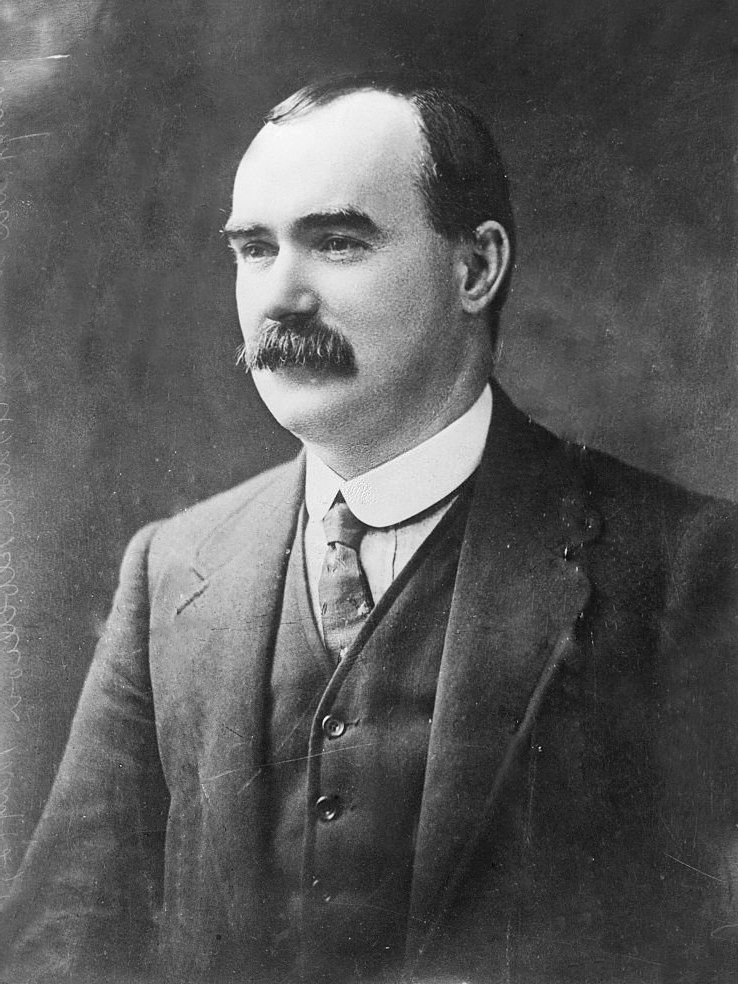
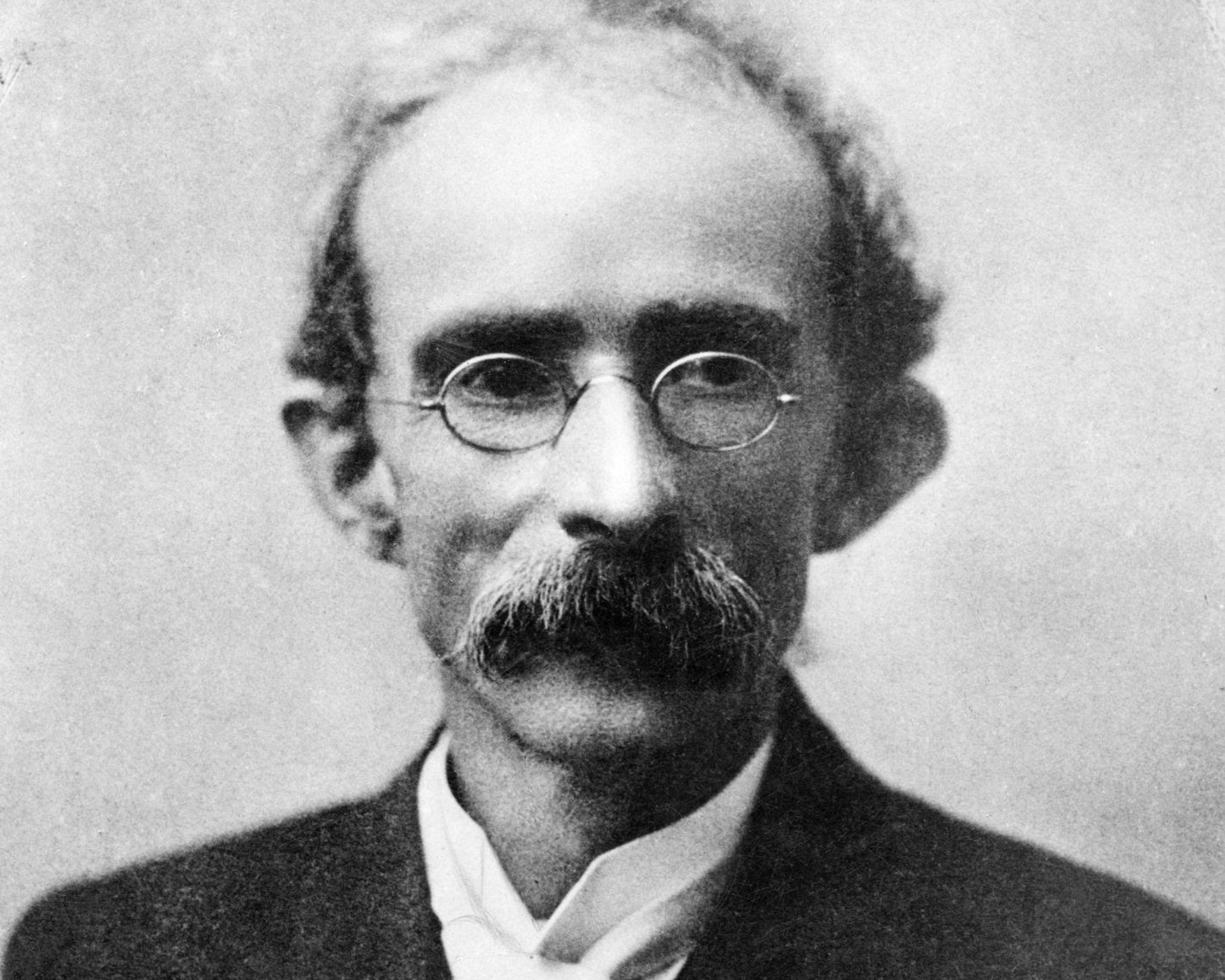
The signatories of the Proclamation: Seán Mac Diarmada, Joseph Plunkett, Éamonn Ceannt, Thomas MacDonagh, Patrick Pearse, James Connolly, Thomas Clarke

The Supreme Council of the IRB met on 5 September 1914, just over a month after the British government had declared war on Germany. At this meeting, they elected to stage an uprising before the war ended and to secure help from Germany. Responsibility for the planning of the rising was given to Tom Clarke and Seán Mac Diarmada. Patrick Pearse, Michael Joseph O'Rahilly, Joseph Plunkett and Bulmer Hobson would assume general control of the Volunteers by March 1915.

In May 1915, Clarke and Mac Diarmada established a Military Council within the IRB, consisting of Pearse, Plunkett and Éamonn Ceannt – and soon themselves – to devise plans for a rising. The Military Council functioned independently and in opposition to those who considered a possible uprising inopportune. Volunteer Chief-of-Staff Eoin MacNeill supported a rising only if the British government attempted to suppress the Volunteers or introduce conscription in Ireland, and if such a rising had some chance of success. Hobson and IRB President Denis McCullough held similar views as did much of the executive branches of both organisations.

The Military Council kept its plans secret, so as to prevent the British authorities from learning of the plans, and to thwart those within the organisation who might try to stop the rising. The secrecy of the plans was such that the Military Council largely superseded the IRB's Supreme Council with even McCullough being unaware of some of the plans, whereas the likes of MacNeill were only informed as the Rising rapidly approached. Although most Volunteers were oblivious to any plans their training increased in the preceding year. The public nature of their training heightened tensions with authorities, which, come the next year, manifested in rumours of the Rising. (Note: Increased training was present within the Glasgow-based contingency of Volunteers. Other metropolitan mainland branches existed in Manchester, Cardiff, Glasgow, Liverpool, and Newcastle. Eighty-seven of the Volunteers involved in the Rising came from Britain.) Public displays likewise existed in the espousal of anti-recruitment. The number of Volunteers also increased: between December 1914 and February 1916 the rank and file rose from 9,700 to 12,215. Although the likes of the civil servants were discouraged from joining the Volunteers, the organisation was permitted by law.

Shortly after the outbreak of World War I, Roger Casement and John Devoy went to Germany and began negotiations with the German government and military. Casement – later accompanied by Plunkett – persuaded the Germans to announce their support for Irish independence in November 1914. Casement envisioned the recruitment of Irish prisoners of war, to be known as the Irish Brigade, aided by a German expeditionary force who would secure the line of the River Shannon, before advancing on the capital. Neither intention came to fruition, but the German military did agree to ship arms and ammunition to the Volunteers, gunrunning having become difficult and dangerous on account of the war.

In late 1915 and early 1916, Devoy had trusted couriers deliver approximately $100,000 from the American-based Irish Republican organization Clan na Gael to the IRB. In January 1916, the Supreme Council of the IRB decided that the rising would begin on Easter Sunday, 23 April 1916. On 5 February 1916, Devoy received a coded message from the Supreme Council of the IRB informing him of their decision to start a rebellion at Easter 1916: "We have decided to begin action on Easter Sunday. We must have your arms and munitions in Limerick between Good Friday and Easter Sunday. We expect German help immediately after beginning action. We might have to begin earlier."

Head of the Irish Citizen Army, James Connolly, was unaware of the IRB's plans, and threatened to start a rebellion on his own if other parties failed to act. The IRB leaders met with Connolly in Dolphin's Barn in January 1916 and convinced him to join forces with them. They agreed that they would launch a rising together at Easter and made Connolly the sixth member of the Military Council. Thomas MacDonagh would later become the seventh and final member.

The death of the old Fenian leader Jeremiah O'Donovan Rossa in New York City in August 1915 was an opportunity to mount a spectacular demonstration. His body was sent to Ireland for burial in Glasnevin Cemetery, with the Volunteers in charge of arrangements. Huge crowds lined the route and gathered at the graveside. Pearse (wearing the uniform of the Irish Volunteers) made a dramatic funeral oration, a rallying call to republicans, which ended with the words "Ireland unfree shall never be at peace".

== Build-up to Easter Week ==
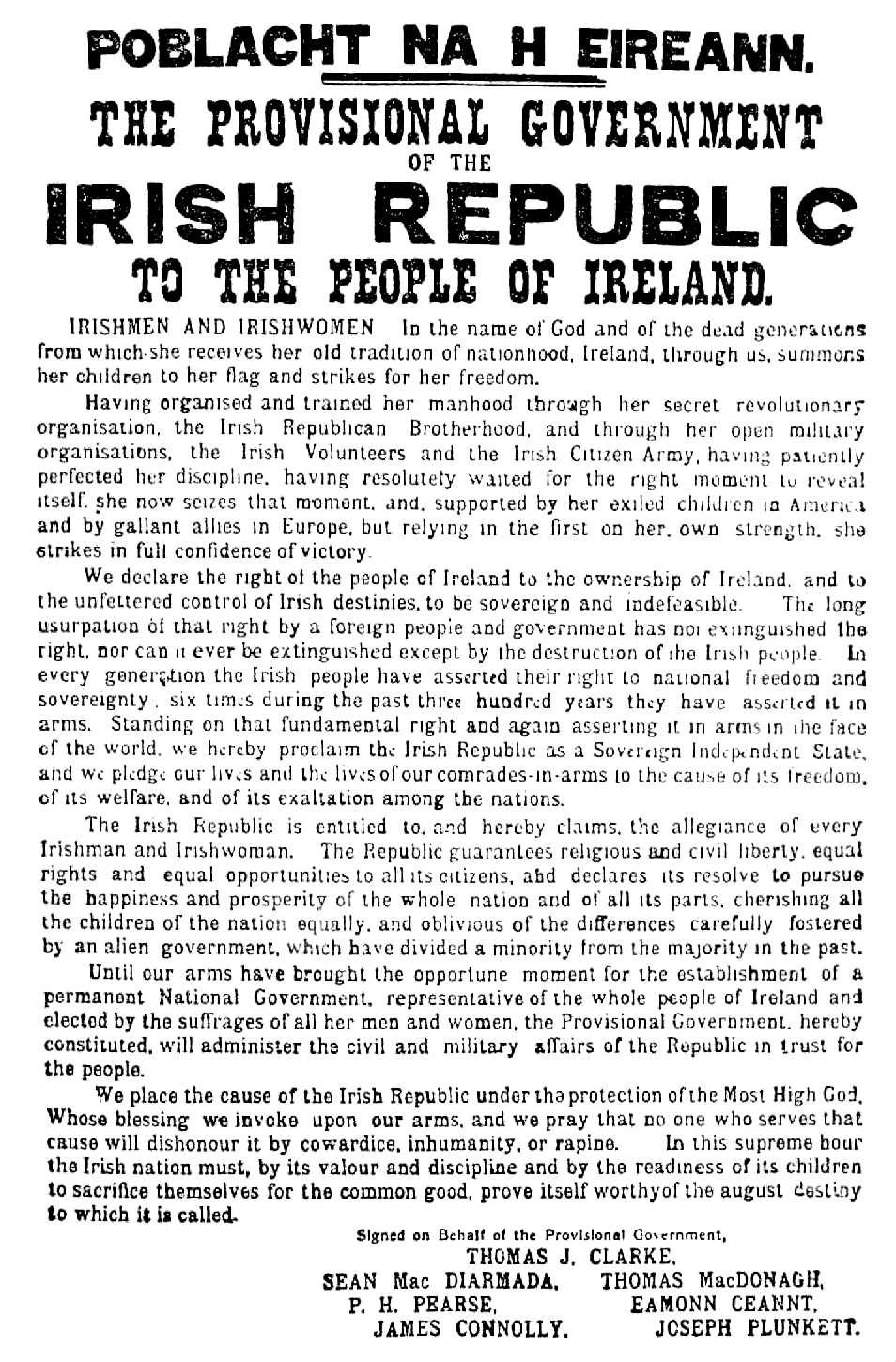
Proclamation of the Republic, Easter 1916

In early April, Pearse issued orders to the Irish Volunteers for three days of "parades and manoeuvres" beginning on Easter Sunday. He had the authority to do this, as the Volunteers' Director of Organisation. The idea was that IRB members within the organisation would know these were orders to begin the rising, while men such as MacNeill and the British authorities would take it at face value.

On 9 April, the German Navy dispatched the SS Libau for County Kerry, disguised as the Norwegian ship Aud. It was loaded with 20,000 rifles, one million rounds of ammunition, and explosives. Casement also left for Ireland aboard the German submarine U-19. He was disappointed with the level of support offered by the Germans and he intended to stop or at least postpone the rising. During this time, the Volunteers amassed ammunition from various sources, including the adolescent Michael McCabe.

On Wednesday 19 April, Alderman Tom Kelly, a Sinn Féin member of Dublin Corporation, read out at a meeting of the corporation a document purportedly leaked from Dublin Castle, detailing plans by the British authorities to shortly arrest leaders of the Irish Volunteers, Sinn Féin and the Gaelic League, and occupy their premises. Although the British authorities said the "Castle Document" was fake, MacNeill ordered the Volunteers to prepare to resist. Unbeknownst to MacNeill, the document had been forged by the Military Council to persuade moderates of the need for their planned uprising. It was an edited version of a real document outlining British plans in the event of conscription. That same day, the Military Council informed senior Volunteer officers that the rising would begin on Easter Sunday. However, it chose not to inform the rank-and-file, or moderates such as MacNeill, until the last minute.

The following day, MacNeill got wind that a rising was about to be launched and threatened to do everything he could to prevent it, short of informing the British. He and Hobson confronted Pearse, but refrained from decisive action as to avoiding instigating a rebellion of any kind; Hobson would be detained by Volunteers until the Rising occurred. (Note: MacNeill was briefly persuaded to go along with some sort of action when Mac Diarmada revealed to him that a German arms shipment was about to land in County Kerry. MacNeill believed that when the British learned of the shipment they would immediately suppress the Volunteers, thus the Volunteers would be justified in taking defensive action, including the planned manoeuvres.)

The SS Libau (disguised as the Aud) and the U-19 reached the coast of Kerry on Good Friday, 21 April. This was earlier than the Volunteers expected and so none were there to meet the vessels. The Royal Navy had known about the arms shipment and intercepted the SS Libau, prompting the captain to scuttle the ship. Furthermore, Casement was captured shortly after he landed at Banna Strand.

When MacNeill learned that the arms shipment had been lost, he reverted to his original position. With the support of other leaders of like mind, notably Bulmer Hobson and The O'Rahilly, he issued a countermand to all Volunteers, cancelling all actions for Sunday. This countermanding order was relayed to Volunteer officers and printed in the Sunday morning newspapers. The order resulted in a delay to the rising by a day, and some confusion over strategy for those who took part.

British Naval Intelligence had been aware of the arms shipment, Casement's return, and the Easter date for the rising through radio messages between Germany and its embassy in the United States that were intercepted by the Royal Navy and deciphered in Room 40 of the Admiralty. It is unclear how extensive Room 40's decryptions preceding the Rising were. On the eve of the Rising, John Dillon wrote to Redmond of Dublin being "full of most extraordinary rumours. And I have no doubt in my mind that the Clan men – are planning some devilish business – what it is I cannot make out. It may not come off – But you must not be surprised if something very unpleasant and mischievous happens this week".

The information was passed to the Under-Secretary for Ireland, Sir Matthew Nathan, on 17 April, but without revealing its source; Nathan was doubtful about its accuracy. When news reached Dublin of the capture of the SS Libau and the arrest of Casement, Nathan conferred with the Lord Lieutenant, Lord Wimborne. Nathan proposed to raid Liberty Hall, headquarters of the Citizen Army, and Volunteer properties at Father Matthew Park and at Kimmage, but Wimborne insisted on wholesale arrests of the leaders. It was decided to postpone action until after Easter Monday, and in the meantime, Nathan telegraphed the Chief Secretary, Augustine Birrell, in London seeking his approval. By the time Birrell cabled his reply authorising the action, at noon on Monday 24 April 1916, the Rising had already begun.

On the morning of Easter Sunday, 23 April, the Military Council met at Liberty Hall to discuss what to do in light of MacNeill's countermanding order. They decided that the Rising would go ahead the following day, Easter Monday, and that the Irish Volunteers and Irish Citizen Army would go into action as the 'Army of the Irish Republic'. They elected Pearse as president of the Irish Republic, and also as Commander-in-Chief of the army; Connolly became Commandant of the Dublin Brigade. That weekend was largely spent preparing rations and manufacturing ammunition and bombs. Messengers were then sent to all units informing them of the new orders.

The Imperial German Navy decided to carry out a diversionary raid on eastern England, timed to coincide with the rising. An airship raid on the night of 24th/25th April scattered bombs over mostly rural areas, and on the early hours of 25th April, German battlecruisers bombarded the fishing ports of Lowestoft and Great Yarmouth. An inconclusive naval battle followed in the North Sea.

== The Rising in Dublin ==
=== Easter Monday ===
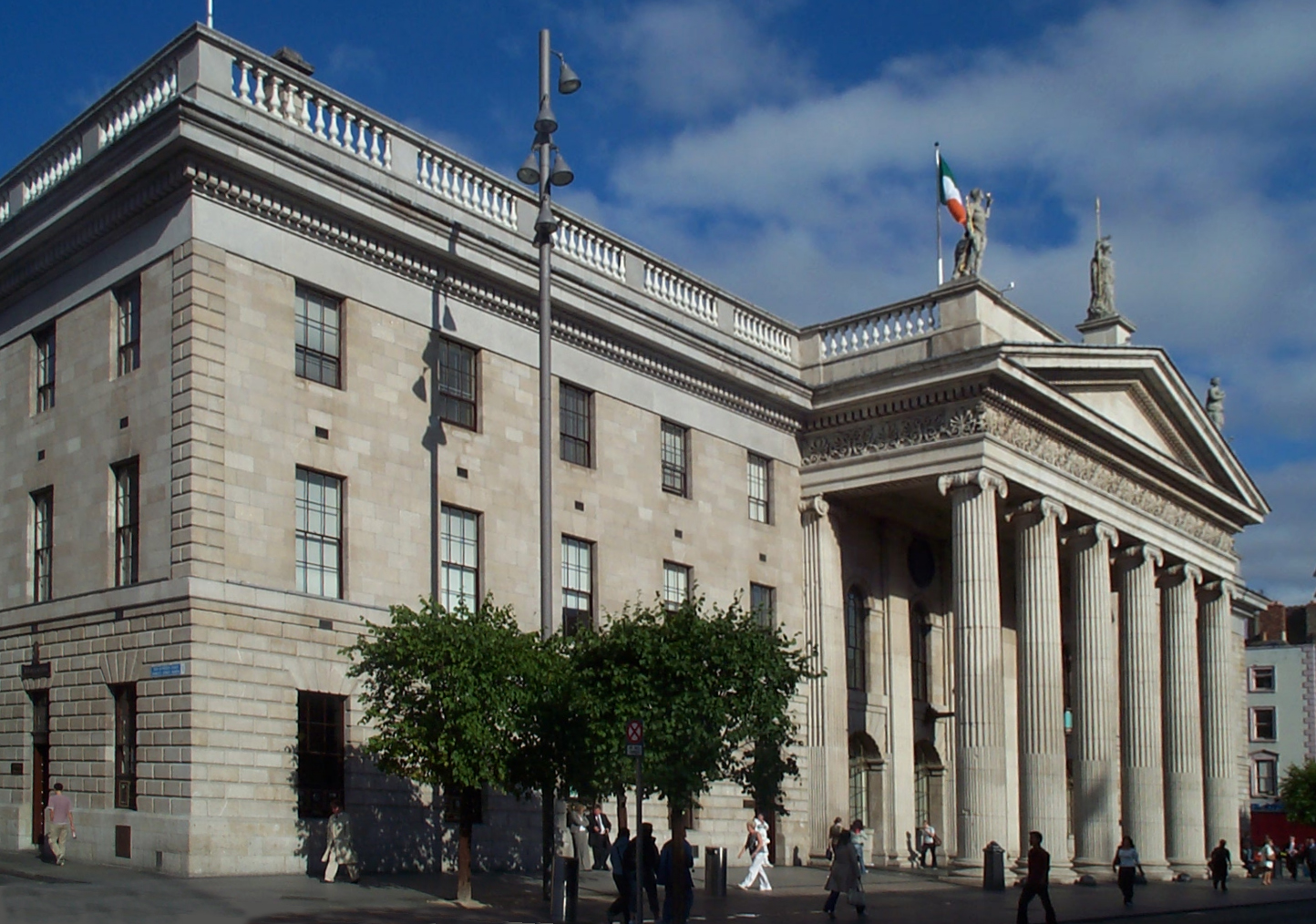
The General Post Office in Dublin – the rebel headquarters

One of two flags flown over the GPO during the Rising

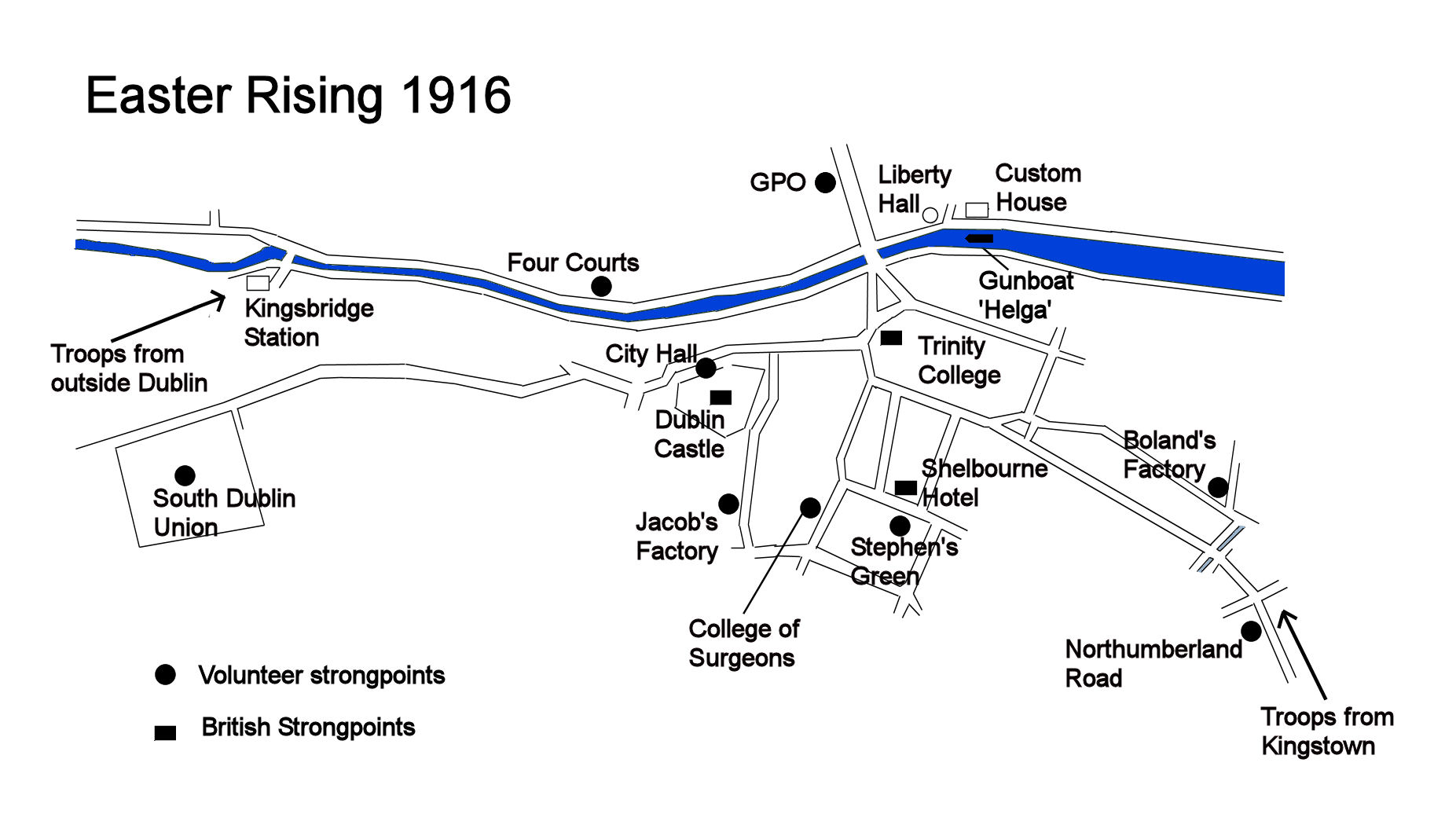
Positions of rebel and British forces in central Dublin

On the morning of Monday 24 April, about 1,200 members of the Irish Volunteers and Irish Citizen Army mustered at several locations in central Dublin. Among them were members of the all-female Cumann na mBan. Some wore Irish Volunteer and Citizen Army uniforms, while others wore civilian clothes with a yellow Irish Volunteer armband, military hats, and bandoliers. They were armed mostly with rifles (especially 1871 Mausers), but also with shotguns, revolvers, a few Mauser C96 semi-automatic pistols, and grenades. The number of Volunteers who mobilised was much smaller than expected. This was due to MacNeill's countermanding order, and the fact that the new orders had been sent so soon beforehand. However, several hundred Volunteers joined the Rising after it began.

Shortly before midday, the rebels began to seize important sites in central Dublin. The rebels' plan was to hold Dublin city centre. This was a large, oval-shaped area bounded by two canals: the Grand to the south and the Royal to the north, with the River Liffey running through the middle. On the southern and western edges of this district were five British Army barracks. Most of the rebels' positions had been chosen to defend against counter-attacks from these barracks. The rebels took the positions with ease. Civilians were evacuated and policemen were ejected or taken prisoner. Windows and doors were barricaded, food and supplies were secured, and first aid posts were set up. Barricades were erected on the streets to hinder British Army movement.

A joint force of about 400 Volunteers and the Citizen Army gathered at Liberty Hall under the command of Commandant James Connolly. This was the headquarters battalion, and it also included Commander-in-Chief Patrick Pearse, as well as Tom Clarke, Seán Mac Diarmada and Joseph Plunkett. They marched to the General Post Office (GPO) on O'Connell Street, Dublin's main thoroughfare, occupied the building and hoisted two republican flags. Pearse stood outside and read the Proclamation of the Irish Republic. Copies of the Proclamation were also pasted on walls and handed out to bystanders by Volunteers and newsboys. The GPO would be the rebels' headquarters for most of the Rising. Volunteers from the GPO also occupied other buildings on the street, including buildings overlooking O'Connell Bridge. They took over a wireless telegraph station and sent out a radio broadcast in Morse code, announcing that an Irish Republic had been declared. This was the first radio broadcast in an independent Ireland.

Elsewhere, some of the headquarters battalion under Michael Mallin occupied St Stephen's Green, where they dug trenches and barricaded the surrounding roads. The 1st battalion, under Edward 'Ned' Daly, occupied the Four Courts and surrounding buildings, while a company under Seán Heuston occupied the Mendicity Institution, across the River Liffey from the Four Courts. The 2nd battalion, under Thomas MacDonagh, occupied Jacob's biscuit factory. The 3rd battalion, under Éamon de Valera, occupied Boland's Mill and surrounding buildings (uniquely, without the presence of Cumann na mBan women whom de Valera expressly excluded). The 4th battalion, under Éamonn Ceannt, occupied the South Dublin Union and the distillery on Marrowbone Lane. From each of these garrisons, small units of rebels established outposts in the surrounding area.

The rebels also attempted to cut transport and communication links. As well as erecting roadblocks, they took control of various bridges and cut telephone and telegraph wires. Westland Row and Harcourt Street railway stations were occupied, though the latter only briefly. The railway line was cut at Fairview and the line was damaged by bombs at Amiens Street, Broadstone, Kingsbridge and Lansdowne Road.

Around midday, a small team of Volunteers and Fianna Éireann members swiftly captured the Magazine Fort in the Phoenix Park and disarmed the guards. The goal was to seize weapons and blow up the ammunition store to signal that the Rising had begun. They seized weapons and planted explosives, but the blast was not loud enough to be heard across the city. The 23-year-old son of the fort's commander was fatally shot when he ran to raise the alarm.

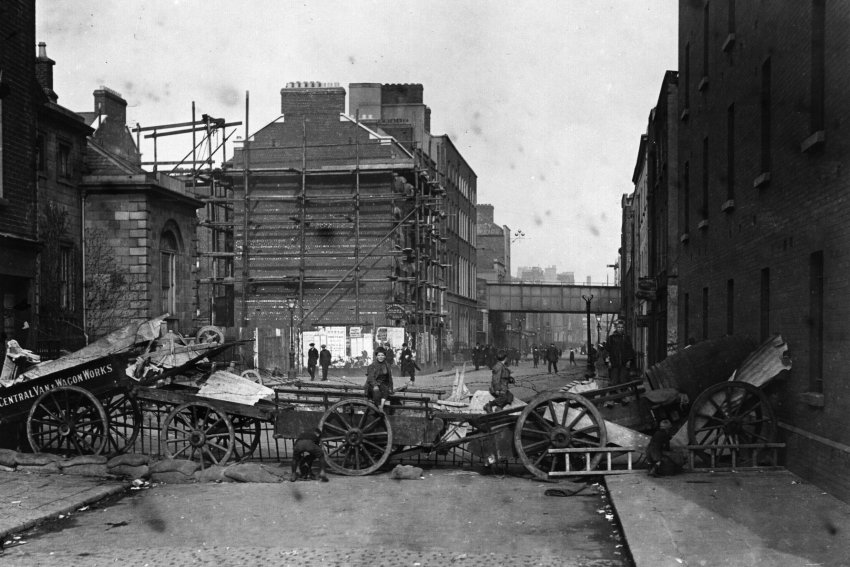
A street barricade erected by the rebels outside the Westmoreland Lock Hospital in Dublin during the Rising

A contingent under Seán Connolly occupied Dublin City Hall and adjacent buildings. They attempted to seize neighbouring Dublin Castle, the heart of British rule in Ireland. As they approached the gate a lone and unarmed police sentry, James O'Brien, attempted to stop them and was shot dead by Connolly. According to some accounts, he was the first casualty of the Rising. The rebels overpowered the soldiers in the guardroom but failed to press further. The British Army's chief intelligence officer, Major Ivon Price, fired on the rebels while the Under-Secretary for Ireland, Sir Matthew Nathan, helped shut the castle gates. Unbeknownst to the rebels, the Castle was lightly guarded and could have been taken with ease. The rebels instead laid siege to the Castle from City Hall. Fierce fighting erupted there after British reinforcements arrived. The rebels on the roof exchanged fire with soldiers on the street. Seán Connolly was shot dead by a sniper, becoming the first rebel casualty. By the following morning, British forces had re-captured City Hall and taken the rebels prisoner.

The rebels failed to take some other key locations, notably Trinity College, in the heart of the city centre which on Monday and Tuesday was defended by around one hundred University Officers' Training Corps cadets and fourteen Dominion soldiers who were on leave. Failure to capture the telephone exchange in Crown Alley left communications in the hands of the Government with GPO staff quickly repairing telephone wires that had been cut by the rebels. The failure to occupy strategic locations was attributed to lack of manpower. In at least two incidents, at Jacob's and Stephen's Green, the Volunteers and Citizen Army shot and killed civilians who were trying to attack them or dismantle their barricades. Elsewhere, they hit civilians with their rifle butts to drive them off.

The British military were caught totally unprepared by the Rising and their response of the first day was generally un-coordinated. Two squadrons of British cavalry were sent to investigate what was happening. They took fire and casualties from rebel forces at the GPO and at the Four Courts. As one troop passed Nelson's Pillar, the rebels opened fire from the GPO, killing three cavalrymen and two horses and fatally wounding a fourth man. The cavalrymen retreated and were withdrawn to barracks. On Mount Street, a group of Volunteer Training Corps men stumbled upon the rebel position and four were killed before they reached Beggars Bush Barracks. Although ransacked, the barracks were never seized.

The only substantial combat of the first day of the Rising took place at the South Dublin Union where a piquet from the Royal Irish Regiment encountered an outpost of Éamonn Ceannt's force at the northwestern corner of the South Dublin Union. The British troops, after taking some casualties, managed to regroup and launch several assaults on the position before they forced their way inside and the small rebel force in the tin huts at the eastern end of the Union surrendered. However, the Union complex as a whole remained in rebel hands. A nurse in uniform, Margaret Keogh, was shot dead by British soldiers at the Union. She is believed to have been the first civilian killed in the Rising.

Three unarmed Dublin Metropolitan Police were shot dead on the first day of the Rising and their Commissioner pulled them off the streets. Partly as a result of the police withdrawal, a wave of looting broke out in the city centre, especially in the area of O'Connell Street (still officially called "Sackville Street" at the time).

=== Tuesday and Wednesday ===
Lord Wimborne, the Lord Lieutenant, declared martial law on Tuesday evening and handed over civil power to Brigadier-General William Lowe. British forces initially put their efforts into securing the approaches to Dublin Castle and isolating the rebel headquarters, which they believed was in Liberty Hall. The British commander, Lowe, worked slowly, unsure of the size of the force he was up against, and with only 1,269 troops in the city when he arrived from the Curragh Camp in the early hours of Tuesday 25 April. City Hall was taken from the rebel unit that had attacked Dublin Castle on Tuesday morning.

In the early hours of Tuesday, 120 British soldiers, with machine guns, occupied two buildings overlooking St Stephen's Green: the Shelbourne Hotel and United Services Club. At dawn they opened fire on the Citizen Army occupying the green. The rebels returned fire but were forced to retreat to the Royal College of Surgeons building. They remained there for the rest of the week, exchanging fire with British forces.

Fighting erupted along the northern edge of the city centre on Tuesday afternoon. In the northeast, British troops left Amiens Street railway station in an armoured train, to secure and repair a section of damaged tracks. They were attacked by rebels who had taken up position at Annesley Bridge. After a two-hour battle, the British were forced to retreat and several soldiers were captured. At Phibsborough, in the northwest, rebels had occupied buildings and erected barricades at junctions on the North Circular Road. The British summoned 18-pounder field artillery from Athlone and shelled the rebel positions, destroying the barricades. After a fierce firefight, the rebels withdrew.

That afternoon Pearse walked out into O'Connell Street with a small escort and stood in front of Nelson's Pillar. As a large crowd gathered, he read out a 'manifesto to the citizens of Dublin,' calling on them to support the Rising.

The rebels had failed to take either of Dublin's two main railway stations or either of its ports, at Dublin Port and Kingstown. As a result, during the following week, the British were able to bring in thousands of reinforcements from Britain and from their garrisons at the Curragh and Belfast. By the end of the week, British strength stood at over 16,000 men. Their firepower was provided by field artillery which they positioned on the Northside of the city at Phibsborough and at Trinity College, and by the patrol vessel Helga, which sailed up the Liffey, having been summoned from the port at Kingstown. On Wednesday, 26 April, the guns at Trinity College and Helga shelled Liberty Hall, and the Trinity College guns then began firing at rebel positions, first at Boland's Mill and then in O'Connell Street. Some rebel commanders, particularly James Connolly, did not believe that the British would shell the 'second city' of the British Empire.

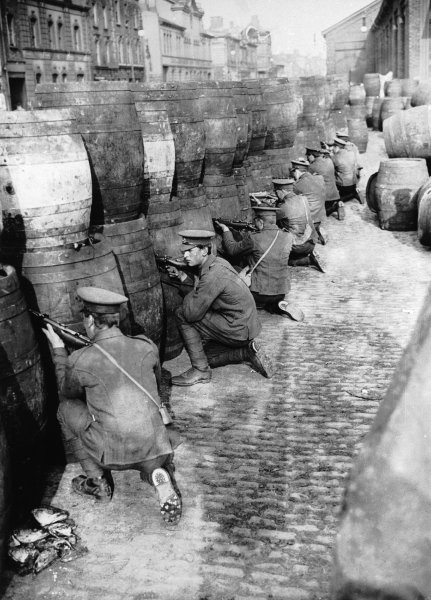
British soldiers in position behind a stack of barrels during the Rising in Dublin

The principal rebel positions at the GPO, the Four Courts, Jacob's Factory and Boland's Mill saw little action. The British surrounded and bombarded them rather than assault them directly. One Volunteer in the GPO recalled, "we did practically no shooting as there was no target". Entertainment ensued within the factory, "everybody merry & cheerful", bar the "occasional sniping", noted one Volunteer. However, where the rebels dominated the routes by which the British tried to funnel reinforcements into the city, there was fierce fighting.

At 5:25 PM a dozen Volunteers, including Eamon Martin, Garry Holohan, Robert Beggs, Sean Cody, Dinny O'Callaghan, Charles Shelley, and Peadar Breslin, attempted to occupy Broadstone railway station on Church Street. The attack was unsuccessful and Martin was injured.

On Wednesday morning, hundreds of British troops encircled the Mendicity Institution, which was occupied by 26 Volunteers under Seán Heuston. British troops advanced on the building, supported by snipers and machine-gun fire, but the Volunteers put up stiff resistance. Eventually, the troops got close enough to hurl grenades into the building, some of which the rebels threw back. Exhausted and almost out of ammunition, Heuston's men became the first rebel position to surrender. Heuston had been ordered to hold his position for a few hours, to delay the British, but had held on for three days.

Reinforcements were sent to Dublin from Britain and disembarked at Kingstown on the morning of Wednesday 26 April. Heavy fighting occurred at the rebel-held positions around the Grand Canal as these troops advanced towards Dublin. More than 1,000 Sherwood Foresters were repeatedly caught in a crossfire trying to cross the canal at Mount Street Bridge. Seventeen Volunteers were able to severely disrupt the British advance, killing or wounding 240 men. Despite there being alternative routes across the canal nearby, General Lowe ordered repeated frontal assaults on the Mount Street position. The British eventually took the position, which had not been reinforced by the nearby rebel garrison at Boland's Mills, on Thursday, but the fighting there inflicted up to two-thirds of their casualties for the entire week for a cost of just four dead Volunteers. It had taken nearly nine hours for the British to advance 300 yd (270 m).

On Wednesday Linenhall Barracks on Constitution Hill was burnt down under the orders of Commandant Edward Daly to prevent its reoccupation by the British.

=== Thursday to Saturday ===
The rebel position at the South Dublin Union (site of the present-day St. James's Hospital) and Marrowbone Lane, further west along the canal, also inflicted heavy losses on British troops. The South Dublin Union was a large complex of buildings and there was vicious fighting around and inside the buildings. Cathal Brugha, a rebel officer, distinguished himself in this action and was badly wounded. By the end of the week, the British had taken some of the buildings in the Union, but others remained in rebel hands. British troops also took casualties in unsuccessful frontal assaults on the Marrowbone Lane Distillery.

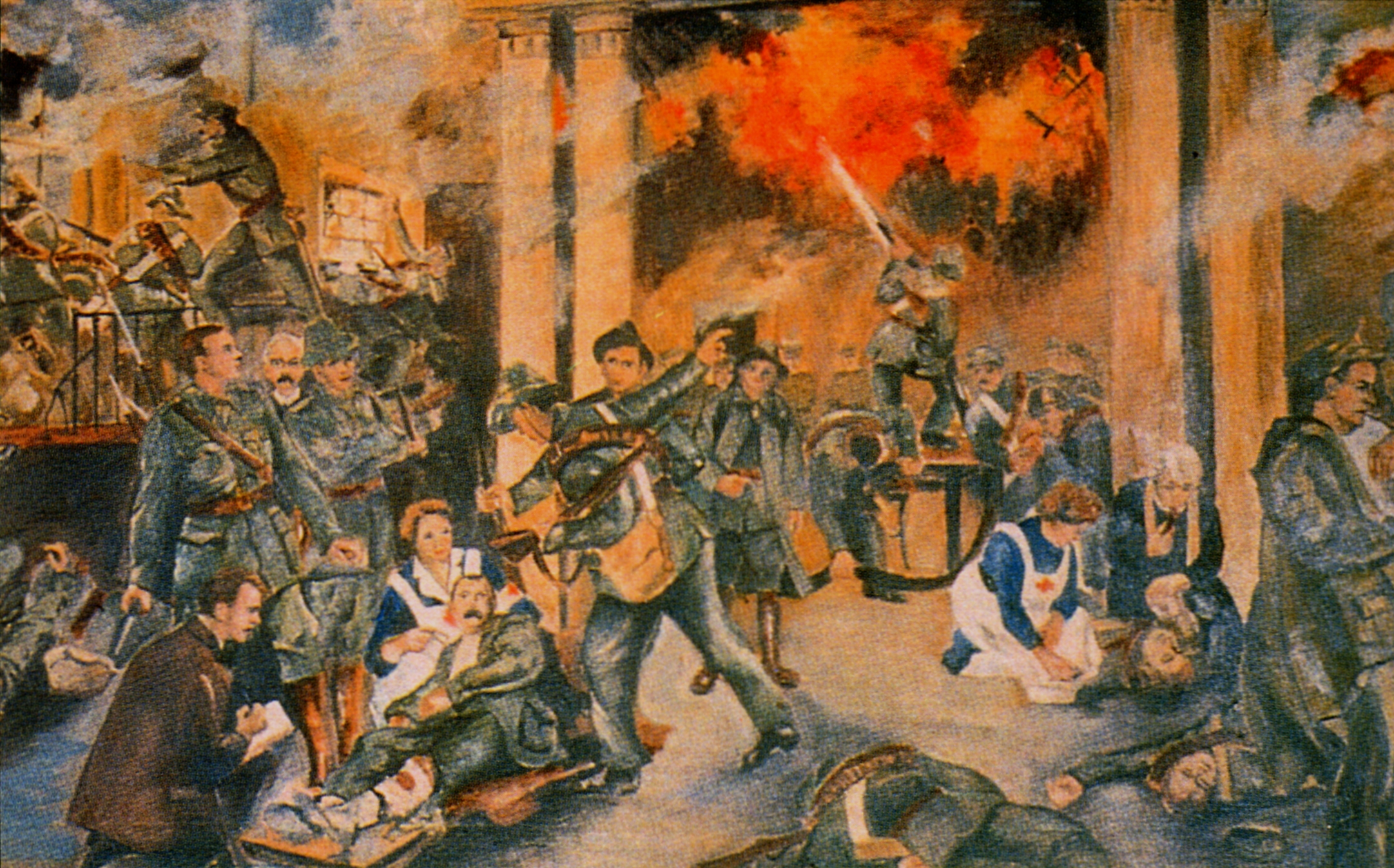
Birth of the Irish Republic by Walter Paget, depicting the GPO during the shelling

The third major scene of fighting during the week was in the area of North King Street, north of the Four Courts. The rebels had established strong outposts in the area, occupying numerous small buildings and barricading the streets. From Thursday to Saturday, the British made repeated attempts to capture the area, in what was some of the fiercest fighting of the Rising. As the troops moved in, the rebels continually opened fire from windows and behind chimneys and barricades. At one point, a platoon led by Major Sheppard made a bayonet charge on one of the barricades but was cut down by rebel fire. The British employed machine guns and attempted to avoid direct fire by using makeshift armoured trucks, and by mouse-holing through the inside walls of terraced houses to get near the rebel positions. By the time of the rebel headquarters' surrender on Saturday, the South Staffordshire Regiment under Colonel Taylor had advanced only 150 yd (140 m) down the street at a cost of 11 dead and 28 wounded. The enraged troops broke into the houses along the street and shot or bayoneted fifteen unarmed male civilians whom they accused of being rebel fighters.

Elsewhere, at Portobello Barracks, an officer named Bowen-Colthurst summarily executed six civilians, including the pacifist nationalist activist, Francis Sheehy-Skeffington. Bowen-Colthurst would later be found guilty but insane by a court martial for murder of these civilians, and was sentenced to confinement in an asylum. These instances of British troops killing Irish civilians would later be highly controversial in Ireland.

=== Surrender ===
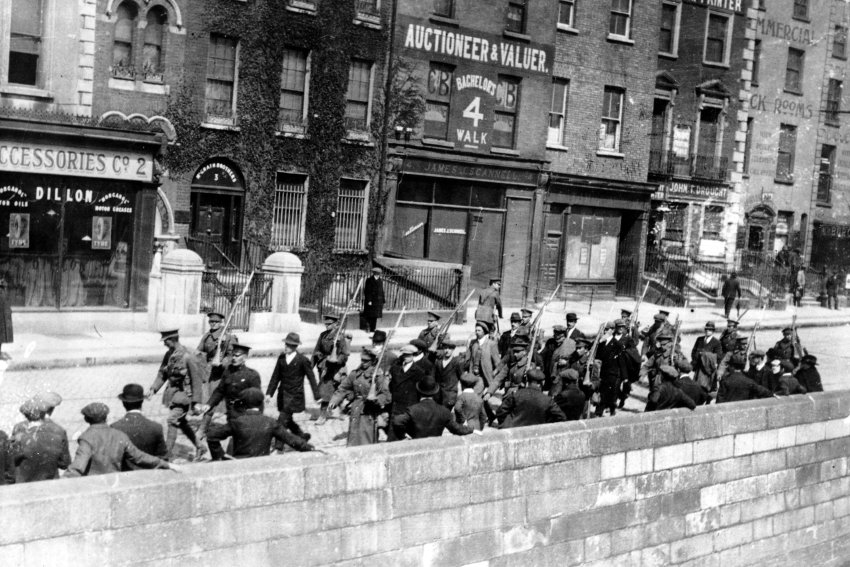
British soldiers marching rebel prisoners away after the surrender

The headquarters garrison at the GPO was forced to evacuate after days of shelling when a fire caused by the shells spread to the GPO. Connolly had been incapacitated by a bullet wound to the ankle and had passed command on to Pearse. The O'Rahilly was killed in a sortie from the GPO. They tunnelled through the walls of the neighbouring buildings in order to evacuate the Post Office without coming under fire and took up a new position in 16 Moore Street. The young Seán McLoughlin was given military command and planned a breakout, but Pearse realised this plan would lead to further loss of civilian life.

On the eve of the surrender, there had been about 35 Cumann na mBan women remaining in the GPO. In the final group that left with Pearse and Connolly, there were three: Connolly's aide de camp, Winifred Carney, who had entered with the original ICA contingent, and the dispatchers and nurses Elizabeth O'Farrell, and Julia Grenan.

On Saturday 29 April, from this new headquarters, Pearse issued an order for all companies to surrender. Pearse surrendered unconditionally to Brigadier-General Lowe. The surrender document read:

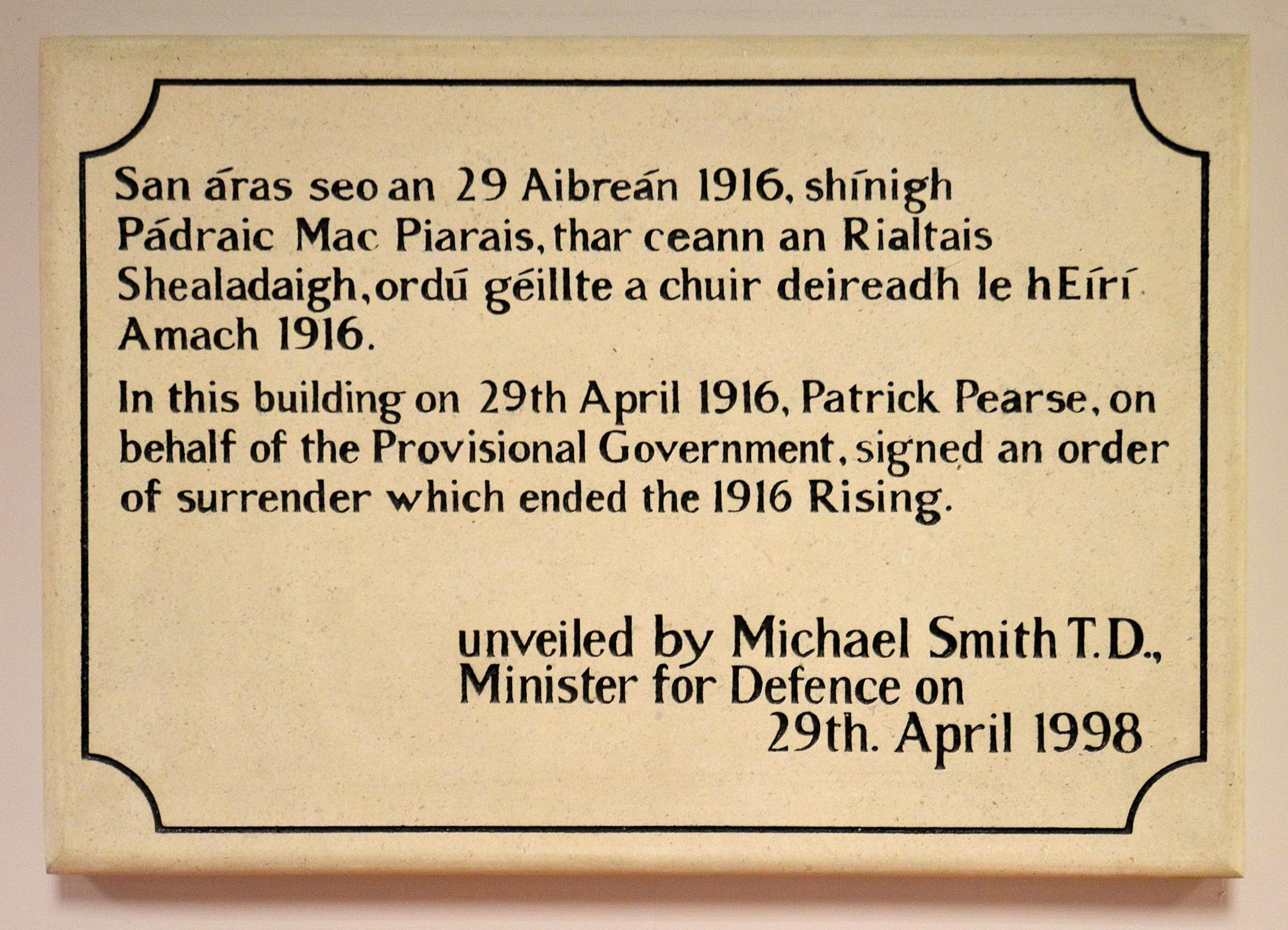
A plaque commemorating Pearse's surrender in person at the Royal Military Command on Infirmary Road

In order to prevent the further slaughter of Dublin citizens, and in the hope of saving the lives of our followers now surrounded and hopelessly outnumbered, the members of the Provisional Government present at headquarters have agreed to an unconditional surrender, and the commandants of the various districts in the City and County will order their commands to lay down arms.

The other posts surrendered only after Pearse's surrender order, carried by O'Farrell, reached them. Sporadic fighting, therefore, continued until Sunday, when word of the surrender was got to the other rebel garrisons. Command of British forces had passed from Lowe to General John Maxwell, who arrived in Dublin just in time to take the surrender. Maxwell was made temporary military governor of Ireland.

== The Rising outside Dublin ==
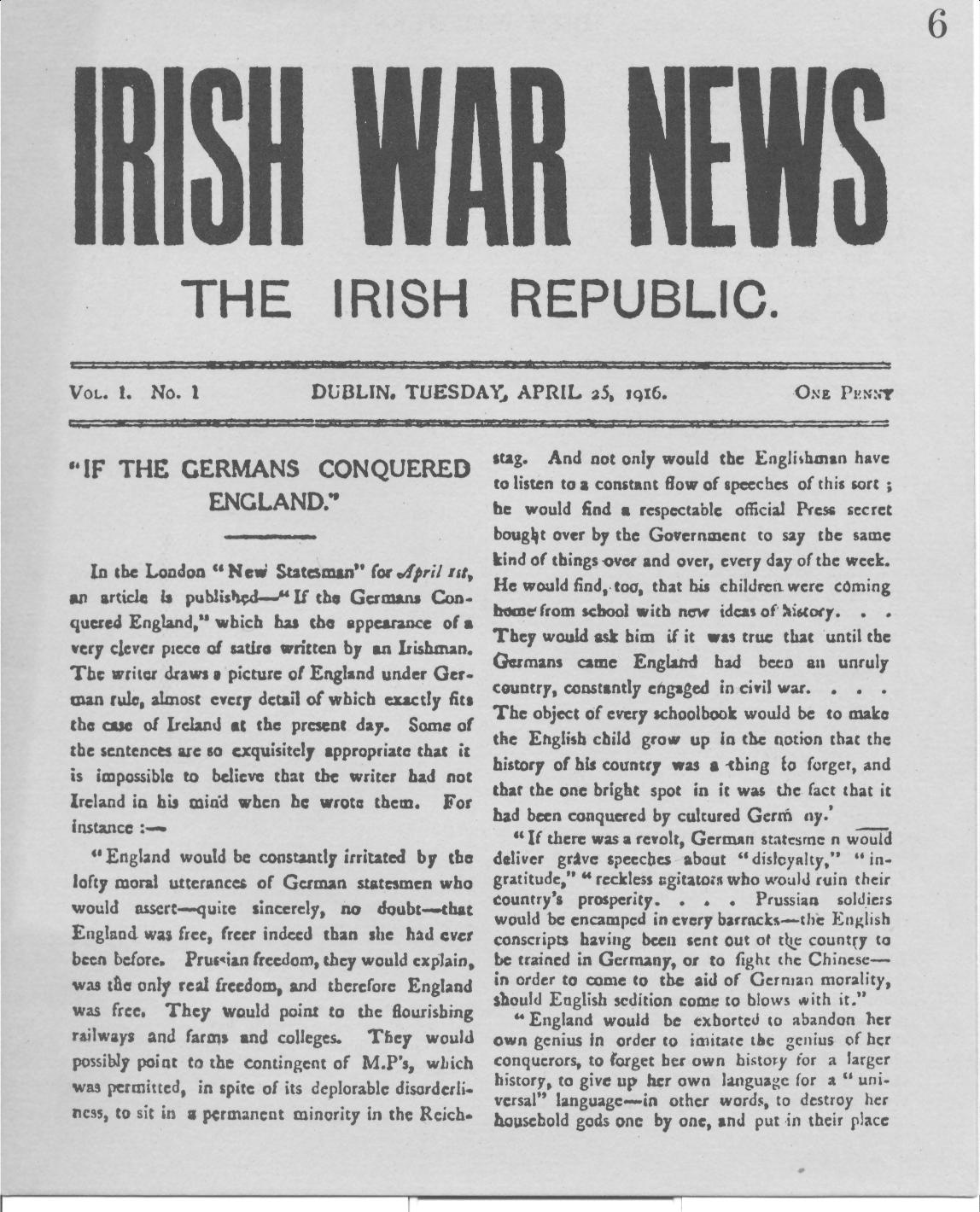
Irish War News, produced by the rebels during the Rising

The Rising was planned to occur across the nation, but MacNeill's countermanding order coupled with the failure to secure German arms hindered this objective significantly. Charles Townshend contended that serious intentions for a national Rising were meagre, being diminished by a focus upon Dublin – although this is an increasingly contentious notion.

In the south, around 1,200 Volunteers commanded by Tomás Mac Curtain mustered on the Sunday in Cork, but they dispersed on Wednesday after receiving nine contradictory orders by dispatch from the Volunteer leadership in Dublin. At their Sheares Street headquarters, some of the Volunteers engaged in a standoff with British forces. Much to the anger of many Volunteers, MacCurtain, under pressure from Catholic clergy, agreed to surrender his men's arms to the British. The only violence in County Cork occurred when the RIC attempted to raid the home of the Kent family. The Kent brothers, who were Volunteers, engaged in a three-hour firefight with the RIC. An RIC officer and one of the brothers were killed, while another brother was later executed. Virtually all rebel family homes were raided, either during or after the Rising.

In the north, Volunteer companies were mobilised in County Tyrone at Coalisland (including 132 men from Belfast led by IRB President Denis McCullough) and Carrickmore, under the leadership of Patrick McCartan. They also mobilised at Creeslough, County Donegal under Daniel Kelly and James McNulty. However, in part because of the confusion caused by the countermanding order, the Volunteers in these locations dispersed without fighting. McCartan claimed that the decision by the leadership of the rebellion not to share plans led to poor communication and uncertainty. McCartan wrote that Tyrone Volunteers could have

"...captured Omagh and burned the barracks...we could have had all the men of Tyrone and Derry...in five districts on Sunday, cleared the police barracks on Sunday night...destroyed wires and railways and got into position on Monday night...We could have marched out of Tyrone probably 1,000 strong, but at worst 500, and all well-armed. Is it any wonder I feel like cursing the Dublin men?"

=== Ashbourne ===
In north County Dublin, about 60 Volunteers mobilised near Swords. They belonged to the 5th Battalion of the Dublin Brigade (also known as the Fingal Battalion), and were led by Thomas Ashe and his second in command, Richard Mulcahy. Unlike the rebels elsewhere, the Fingal Battalion successfully employed guerrilla tactics. They set up camp and Ashe split the battalion into four sections: three would undertake operations while the fourth was kept in reserve, guarding camp and foraging for food. The Volunteers moved against the RIC barracks in Swords, Donabate and Garristown, forcing the RIC to surrender and seizing all the weapons. They also damaged railway lines and cut telegraph wires. The railway line at Blanchardstown was bombed to prevent a troop train from reaching Dublin. This derailed a cattle train, which had been sent ahead of the troop train.

The only large-scale engagement of the Rising, outside Dublin city, was at Ashbourne, County Meath. On Friday, about 35 Fingal Volunteers surrounded the Ashbourne RIC barracks and called on it to surrender, but the RIC responded with a volley of gunfire. A firefight followed, and the RIC surrendered after the Volunteers attacked the building with a homemade grenade. Before the surrender could be taken, up to sixty RIC men arrived in a convoy, sparking a five-hour gun battle, in which eight RIC men were killed and 18 wounded. Two Volunteers were also killed and five wounded, and a civilian was fatally shot. The RIC surrendered and were disarmed. Ashe let them go after warning them not to fight against the Irish Republic again. Ashe's men camped at Kilsalaghan near Dublin until they received orders to surrender on Saturday. The Fingal Battalion's tactics during the Rising foreshadowed those of the IRA during the War of Independence that followed.

Volunteer contingents also mobilised nearby in counties Meath and Louth but proved unable to link up with the North Dublin unit until after it had surrendered. In County Louth, Volunteers shot dead an RIC man near the village of Castlebellingham on 24 April, in an incident in which 15 RIC men were also taken prisoner.

=== Enniscorthy ===
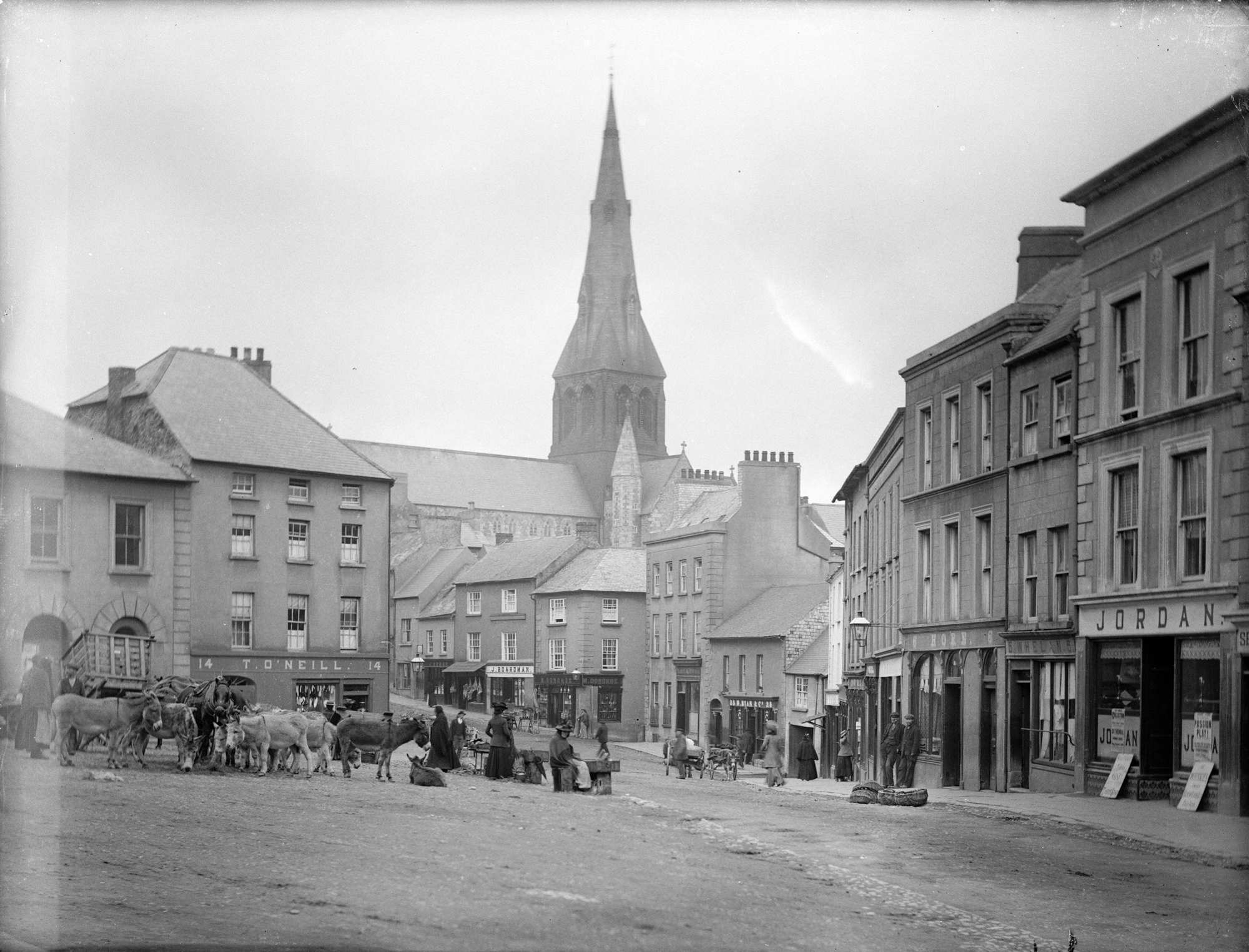
Enniscorthy in the 1890s

In County Wexford, 100–200 Volunteers—led by Robert Brennan, Séamus Doyle and Seán Etchingham—took over the town of Enniscorthy on Thursday 27 April until Sunday. Volunteer officer Paul Galligan had cycled 200 km from rebel headquarters in Dublin with orders to mobilise. They blocked all roads into the town and made a brief attack on the RIC barracks, but chose to blockade it rather than attempt to capture it. They flew the tricolour over the Athenaeum building, which they had made their headquarters, and paraded uniformed in the streets. They also occupied Vinegar Hill, where the United Irishmen had made a last stand in the 1798 rebellion. The public largely supported the rebels and many local men offered to join them.

By Saturday, up to 1,000 rebels had been mobilised, and a detachment was sent to occupy the nearby village of Ferns. In Wexford, the British assembled a column of 1,000 soldiers (including the Connaught Rangers), two field guns and a 4.7 inch naval gun on a makeshift armoured train. On Sunday, the British sent messengers to Enniscorthy, informing the rebels of Pearse's surrender order. However, the Volunteer officers were sceptical. Two of them were escorted by the British to Arbour Hill Prison, where Pearse confirmed the surrender order.

=== Galway ===
In County Galway, 600–700 Volunteers mobilised on Tuesday under Liam Mellows. His plan was to "bottle up the British garrison and divert the British from concentrating on Dublin". However, his men were poorly armed, with only 25 rifles, 60 revolvers, 300 shotguns and some homemade grenades – many of them only had pikes. Most of the action took place in a rural area to the east of Galway city. They made unsuccessful attacks on the RIC barracks at Clarinbridge and Oranmore, captured several officers, and bombed a bridge and railway line, before taking up position near Athenry. There was also a skirmish between rebels and an RIC mobile patrol at Carnmore crossroads. A constable, Patrick Whelan, was shot dead after he had called to the rebels: "Surrender, boys, I know ye all".

On Wednesday, HMS Laburnum arrived in Galway Bay and shelled the countryside on the northeastern edge of Galway. The rebels retreated southeast to Moyode, an abandoned country house and estate. From here they set up lookout posts and sent out scouting parties. On Friday, HMS Gloucester landed 200 Royal Marines and began shelling the countryside near the rebel position. The rebels retreated further south to Limepark, another abandoned country house. Deeming the situation to be hopeless, they dispersed on Saturday morning. Many went home and were arrested following the Rising, while others, including Mellows, went "on the run". By the time British reinforcements arrived in the west, the Rising there had already disintegrated.

=== Limerick and Clare ===
In County Limerick, 300 Irish Volunteers assembled at Glenquin Castle near Killeedy, but they did not take any military action.

In County Clare, Micheal Brennan marched with 100 Volunteers (from Meelick, Oatfield, and Cratloe) to the River Shannon on Easter Monday to await orders from the Rising leaders in Dublin, and weapons from the expected Casement shipment. However, neither arrived and no actions were taken.

== Casualties ==
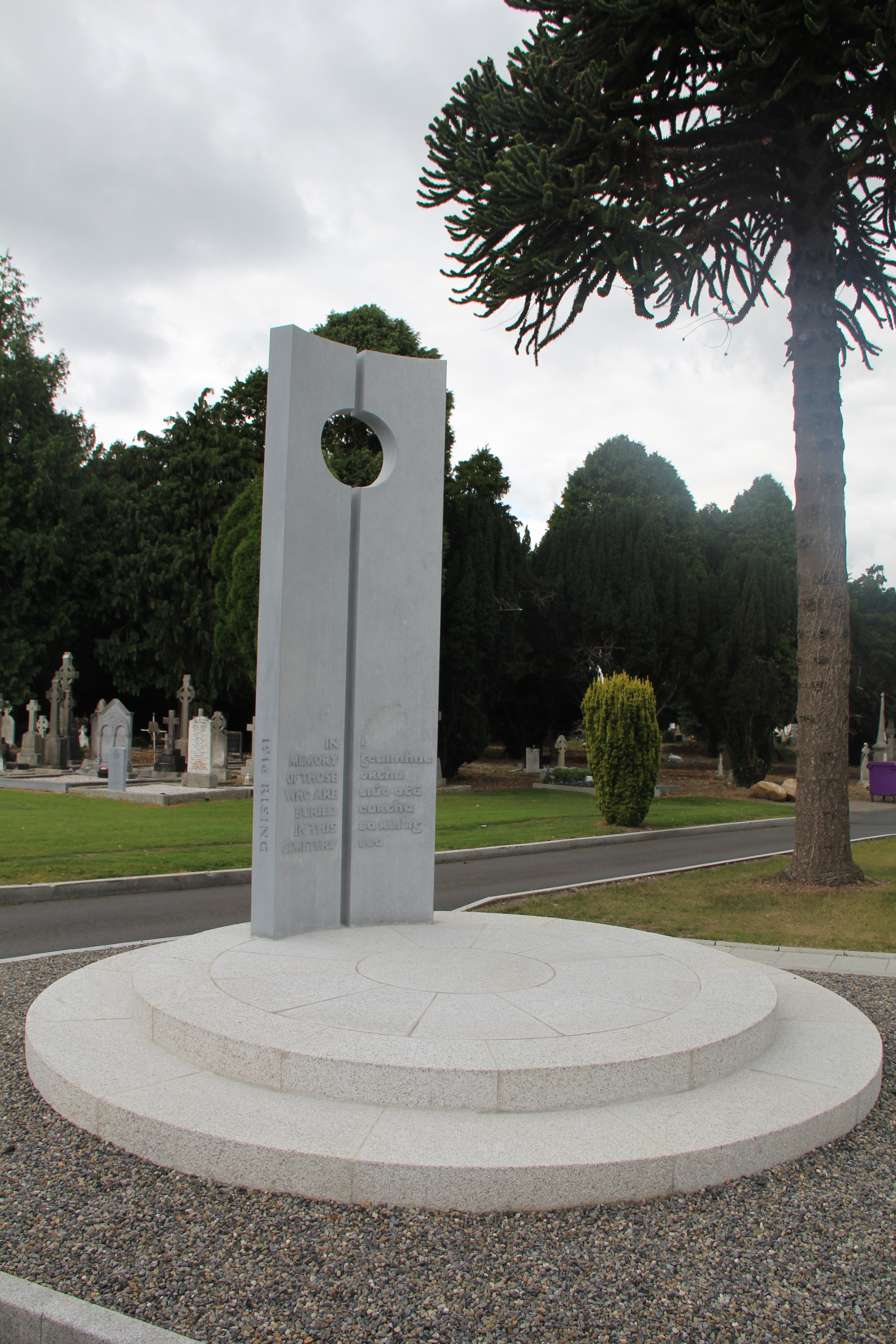
Memorial in Deansgrange Cemetery, where various civilians and members of the Irish Volunteer Army, Irish Citizen Army and British Army are buried

The Easter Rising resulted in at least 485 deaths, according to the Glasnevin Trust. Of those killed:

- 260 (about 54%) were civilians
- 126 (about 26%) were U.K. forces (120 U.K. military personnel, 5 Volunteer Training Corps members, and one Canadian soldier on leave)
  - 35 – Irish Regiments:-
    - 11 – Royal Dublin Fusiliers
    - 10 – Royal Irish Rifles
    - 9 – Royal Irish Regiment
    - 2 – Royal Inniskilling Fusiliers
    - 2 – Royal Irish Fusiliers
    - 1 – Leinster Regiment
  - 74 – British Regiments:-
    - 29 – Sherwood Foresters
    - 15 – South Staffordshire
    - 2 – North Staffordshire
    - 1 – Royal Field Artillery
    - 4 – Royal Engineers
    - 5 – Army Service Corps
    - 10 – Lancers
    - 7 – 8th Hussars
    - 2 – 2nd King Edwards Horse
    - 3 – Yeomanry
  - 1 – Royal Navy
- 82 (about 16%) were Irish rebel forces (64 Irish Volunteers, 15 Irish Citizen Army and 3 Fianna Éireann)
- 17 (about 4%) were police
  - 14 – Royal Irish Constabulary
  - 3 – Dublin Metropolitan Police

More than 2,600 were wounded; including at least 2,200 civilians and rebels, at least 370 British soldiers and 29 policemen. All 16 police fatalities and 22 of the British soldiers killed were Irishmen. About 40 of those killed were children (under 17 years old), four of whom were members of the rebel forces.

The number of casualties each day steadily rose, with 55 killed on Monday and 78 killed on Saturday. The British Army suffered their biggest losses in the Battle of Mount Street Bridge on Wednesday when at least 30 soldiers were killed. The rebels also suffered their biggest losses on that day. The RIC suffered most of their casualties in the Battle of Ashbourne on Friday.

The majority of the casualties, both killed and wounded, were civilians. Most of the civilian casualties and most of the casualties overall were caused by the British Army. This was due to the British using artillery, incendiary shells and heavy machine guns in built-up areas, as well as their "inability to discern rebels from civilians". One Royal Irish Regiment officer recalled, "they regarded, not unreasonably, everyone they saw as an enemy, and fired at anything that moved". Many other civilians were killed when caught in the crossfire. Both sides, British and rebel, also shot civilians deliberately on occasion; for not obeying orders (such as to stop at checkpoints), for assaulting or attempting to hinder them, and for looting. There were also instances of British troops killing unarmed civilians out of revenge or frustration: notably in the North King Street Massacre, where fifteen were killed, and at Portobello Barracks, where six were shot. Furthermore, there were incidents of friendly fire. On 29 April, the Royal Dublin Fusiliers under Company Quartermaster Sergeant Robert Flood shot dead two British officers and two Irish civilian employees of the Guinness Brewery after he decided they were rebels. Flood was court-martialled for murder but acquitted.

According to the historian Fearghal McGarry, the rebels attempted to avoid needless bloodshed. Desmond Ryan stated that Volunteers were told "no firing was to take place except under orders or to repel attack". Aside from the engagement at Ashbourne, policemen and unarmed soldiers were not systematically targeted, and a large group of policemen was allowed to stand at Nelson's Pillar throughout Monday. McGarry writes that the Irish Citizen Army "were more ruthless than Volunteers when it came to shooting policemen" and attributes this to the "acrimonious legacy" of the Dublin Lock-out.

The vast majority of the Irish casualties were buried in Glasnevin Cemetery in the aftermath of the fighting. British families came to Dublin Castle in May 1916 to reclaim the bodies of British soldiers, and funerals were arranged. Soldiers whose bodies were not claimed were given military funerals in Grangegorman Military Cemetery.

== Aftermath ==
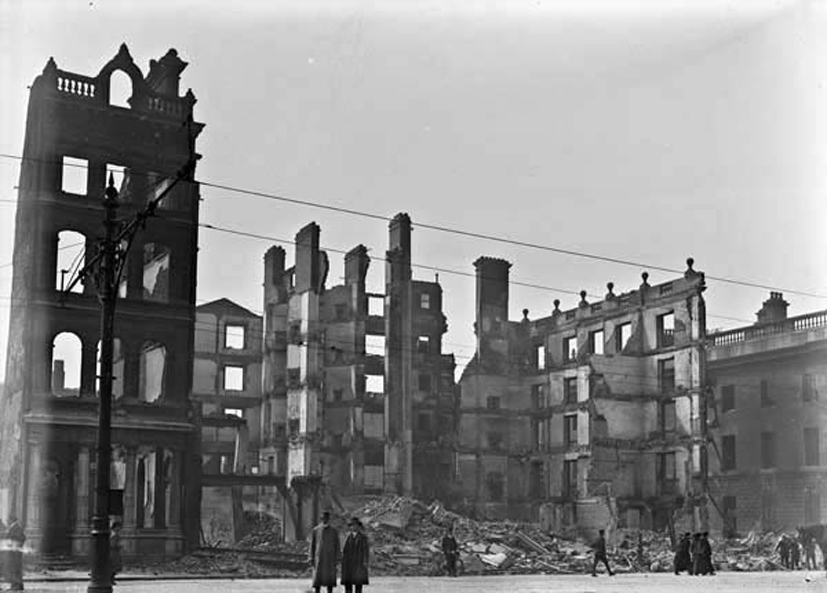
Ruins of the Metropole Hotel on Sackville Street, next to the GPO

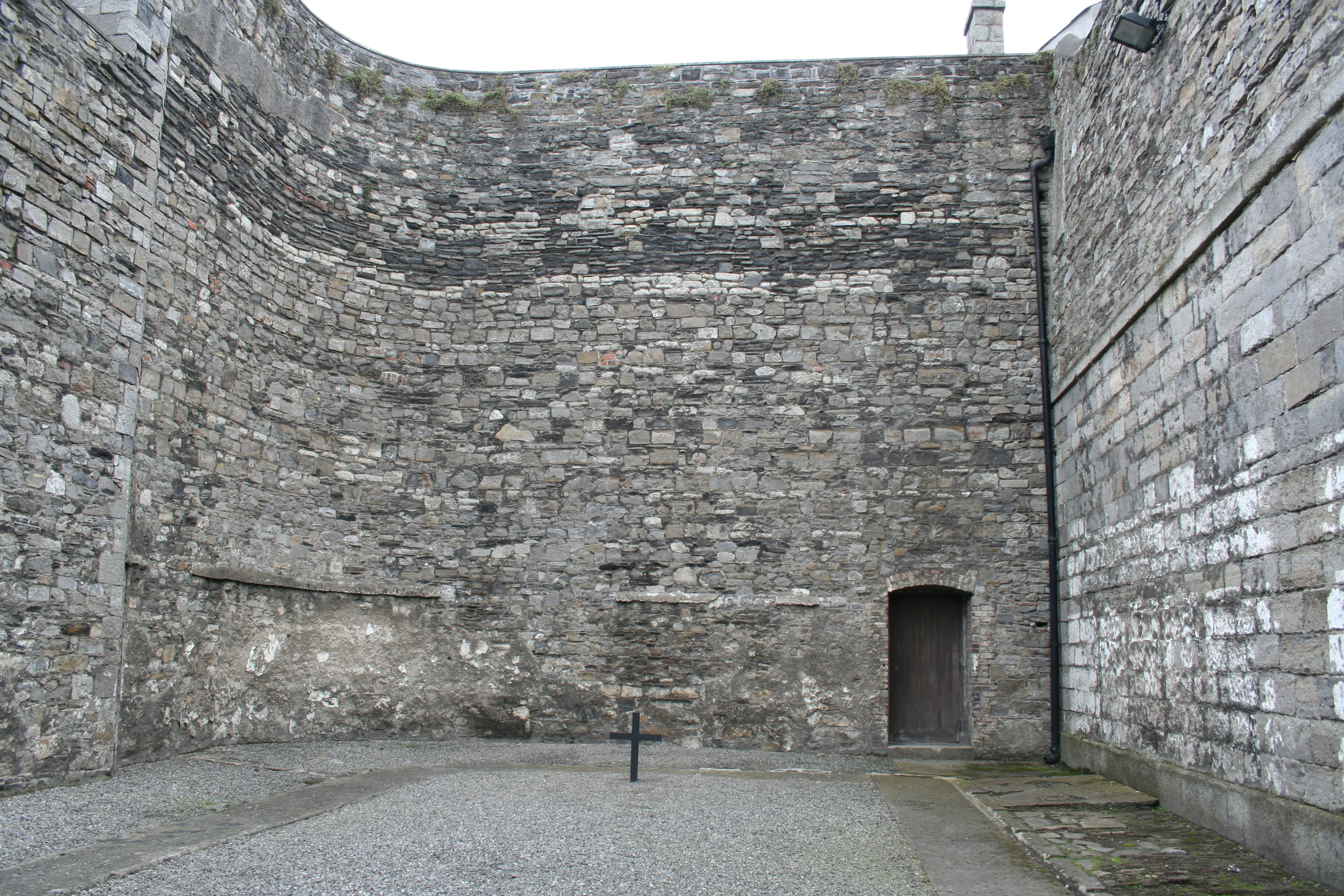
The spot at Kilmainham Gaol where most of the leaders were executed

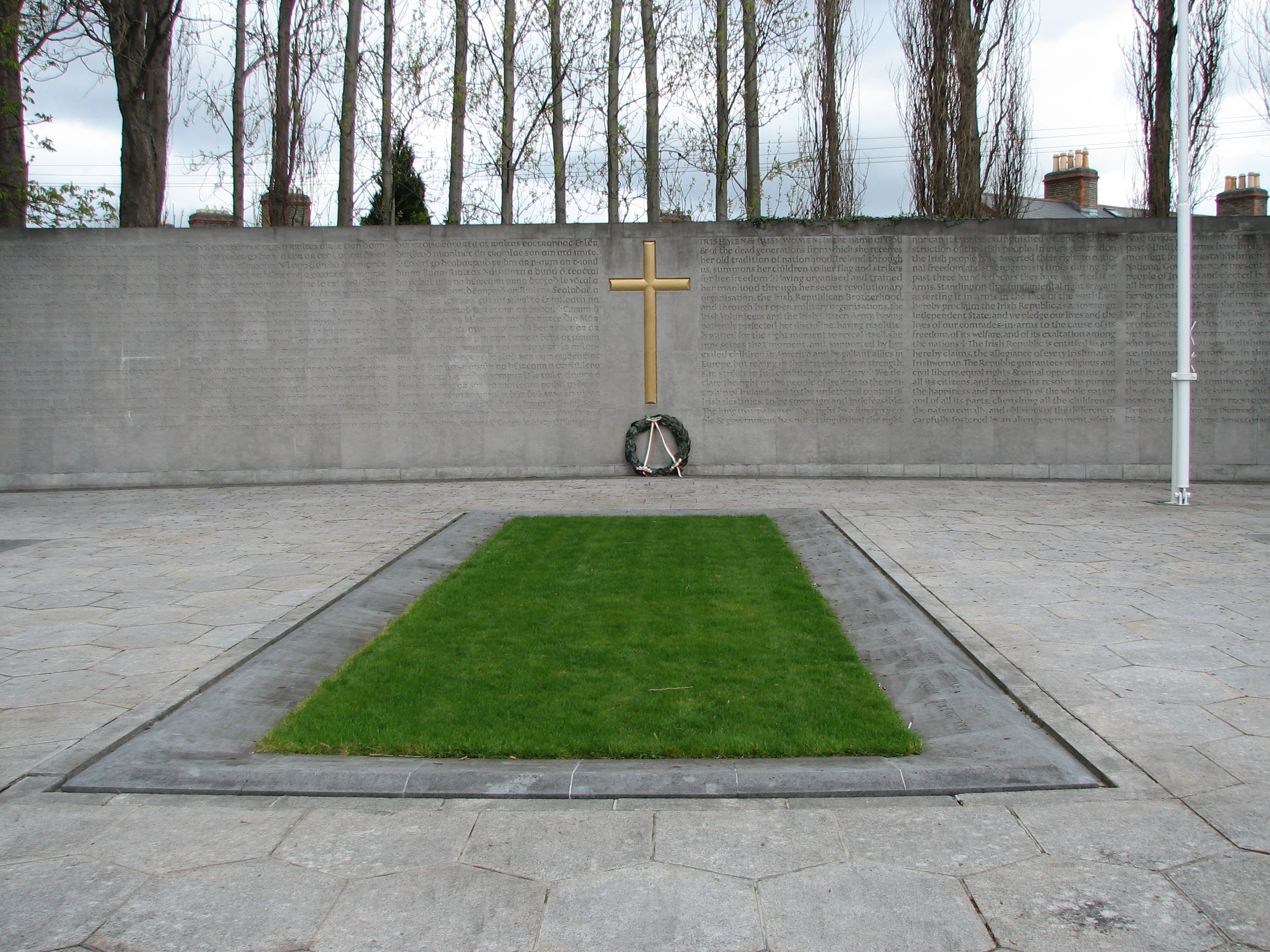
The burial spot of the leaders of the Rising, in the old prison yard of Arbour Hill Prison. The Proclamation of 1916 is inscribed on the wall in both Irish and English

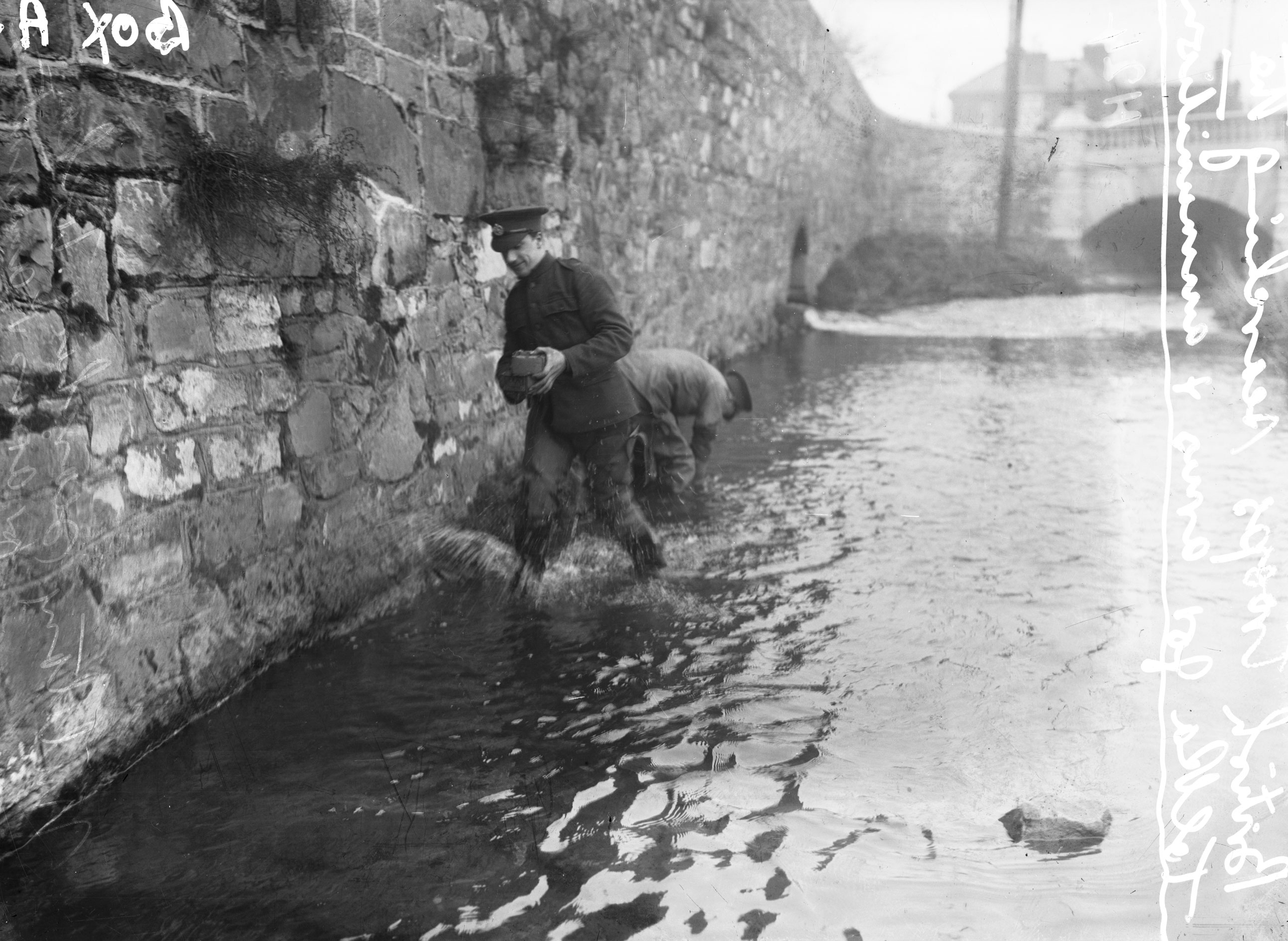
British soldiers searching the River Tolka in Dublin for arms and ammunition after the Easter Rising. May 1916

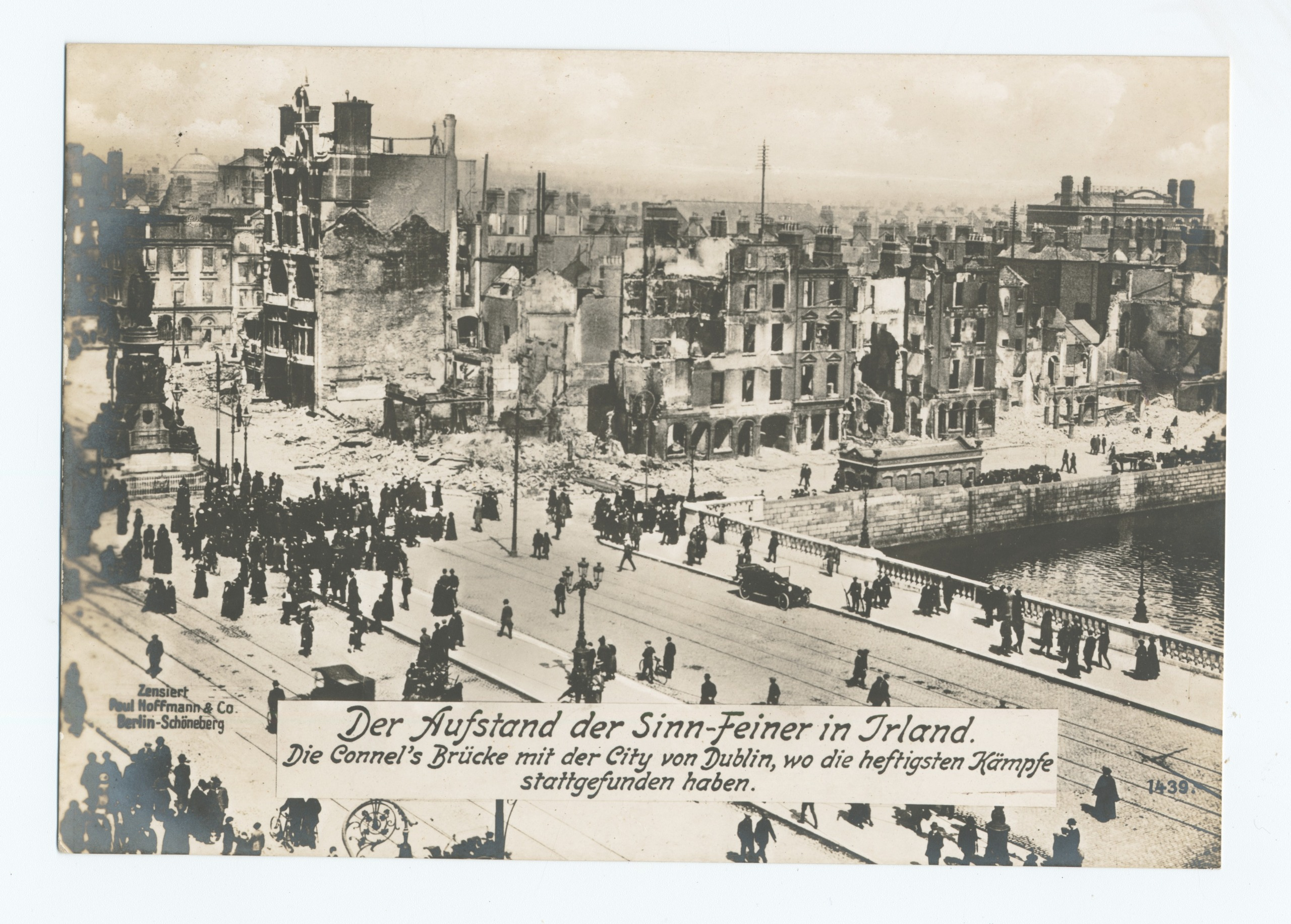
View of O'Connell Bridge, 1916, on a German postcard. The caption reads: Rising of the Sinn Feiners in Ireland. O'Connell bridge with Dublin city, where the fiercest clashes took place.

=== Arrests and executions ===
In the immediate aftermath, the Rising was commonly described as the "Sinn Féin Rebellion" (radical nationalists were referred to at the time as "Sinn Féiners", and the post-split Irish Volunteers were called "Sinn Féin Volunteers"). General Maxwell signalled his intention "to arrest all dangerous Sinn Feiners", including "those who have taken an active part in the movement although not in the present rebellion".

A total of 3,430 men and 79 women were arrested, including 425 people for looting – roughly, 1,500 of these arrests accounted for the rebels. Detainees were overwhelmingly young, Catholic and religious. (Note: Roughly 70% of the GPO garrison was under the age of 30, with 29% of that total being under the age of 20.) 1,424 men and 73 women were released after a few weeks of imprisonment; those interned without trial in England and Wales (see below) were released on Christmas Eve, 1916; the remaining majority of convicts were held until June 1917.

A series of courts martial began on 2 May, in which 187 people were tried. Controversially, Maxwell decided that the courts martial would be held in secret and without a defence, which Crown law officers later ruled to have been illegal. Some of those who conducted the trials had commanded British troops involved in suppressing the Rising, a conflict of interest that the Military Manual prohibited. Only one of those tried by courts martial was a woman, Constance Markievicz, who was also the only woman to be kept in solitary confinement. (Note: Following Markievicz's arrest, an apocryphal story spread, stating that she kissed her revolver before surrendering. This story circulated amidst similar reports of rebel women and their "ferocity". Scholar in Irish Studies, Lisa Weihman wrote that these tales "surely helped justify the swift and brutal repression of the Easter Rising", for even "Ireland's women were out of control." Historian Fionnuala Walsh noted that "[m]any of those women imprisoned could have avoided arrest by leaving the garrisons before the surrender as they were encouraged to do by the rebel leaders. It appears that women wished to endure the same treatment and danger as men.") Ninety were sentenced to death. Fifteen of those (including all seven signatories of the Proclamation) had their sentences confirmed by Maxwell and fourteen were executed by firing squad at Kilmainham Gaol between 3 and 12 May.

Maxwell stated that only the "ringleaders" and those proven to have committed "cold-blooded murder" would be executed. However, some of those executed were not leaders and did not kill anyone, such as Willie Pearse and John MacBride; Thomas Kent did not come out at all—he was executed for the killing of a police officer during the raid on his house the week after the Rising. The most prominent leader to escape execution was Éamon de Valera, Commandant of the 3rd Battalion, who did so partly because of his American birth. Hobson went into hiding, re-emerging after the June amnesty, largely to scorn.

Most of the executions took place over a ten-day period:

- 3 May: Patrick Pearse, Thomas MacDonagh and Thomas Clarke
- 4 May: Joseph Plunkett, William Pearse, Edward Daly and Michael O'Hanrahan
- 5 May: John MacBride
- 8 May: Éamonn Ceannt, Michael Mallin, Seán Heuston and Con Colbert
- 12 May: James Connolly and Seán Mac Diarmada

The arrests greatly affected hundreds of families and communities; anti-English sentiment developed among the public, as separatists declared the arrests as indicative of a draconian approach. The public, at large, feared that the response was "an assault on the entirety of the Irish national cause". This radical transformation was recognised in the moment and had become a point of concern among British authorities; after Connolly's execution, the remaining death sentences were commuted to penal servitude. Growing support for republicanism can be found as early as June 1916; imprisonment largely failed to deter militants – interned rebels would proceed to fight at higher rates than those who weren't – who thereafter quickly reorganised the movement.

==== Frongoch prison camp ====
Under Regulation 14B of the Defence of the Realm Act 1914 1,836 men were interned at internment camps and prisons in England and Wales. As urban areas were becoming the nexus for republicanism, Internees were largely from such areas. (Note: Electoral support for republicanism was, however, more prominent in rural areas.) Many Internees had not taken part in the Rising; many thereafter became sympathetic to the nationalist cause.

Internees occupied themselves with the likes of lectures, craftwork, music and sports. These activities – which included games of Gaelic football, crafting of Gaelic symbols, and lessons in Irish – regularly had a nationalist character and the cause itself developed a sense of cohesion within the camps. The military studies included discussion of the Rising. Internment lasted until December of that year with releases having started in July. Martial law had ceased by the end of November.

Casement was tried in London for high treason and hanged at Pentonville Prison on 3 August.

=== British atrocities ===
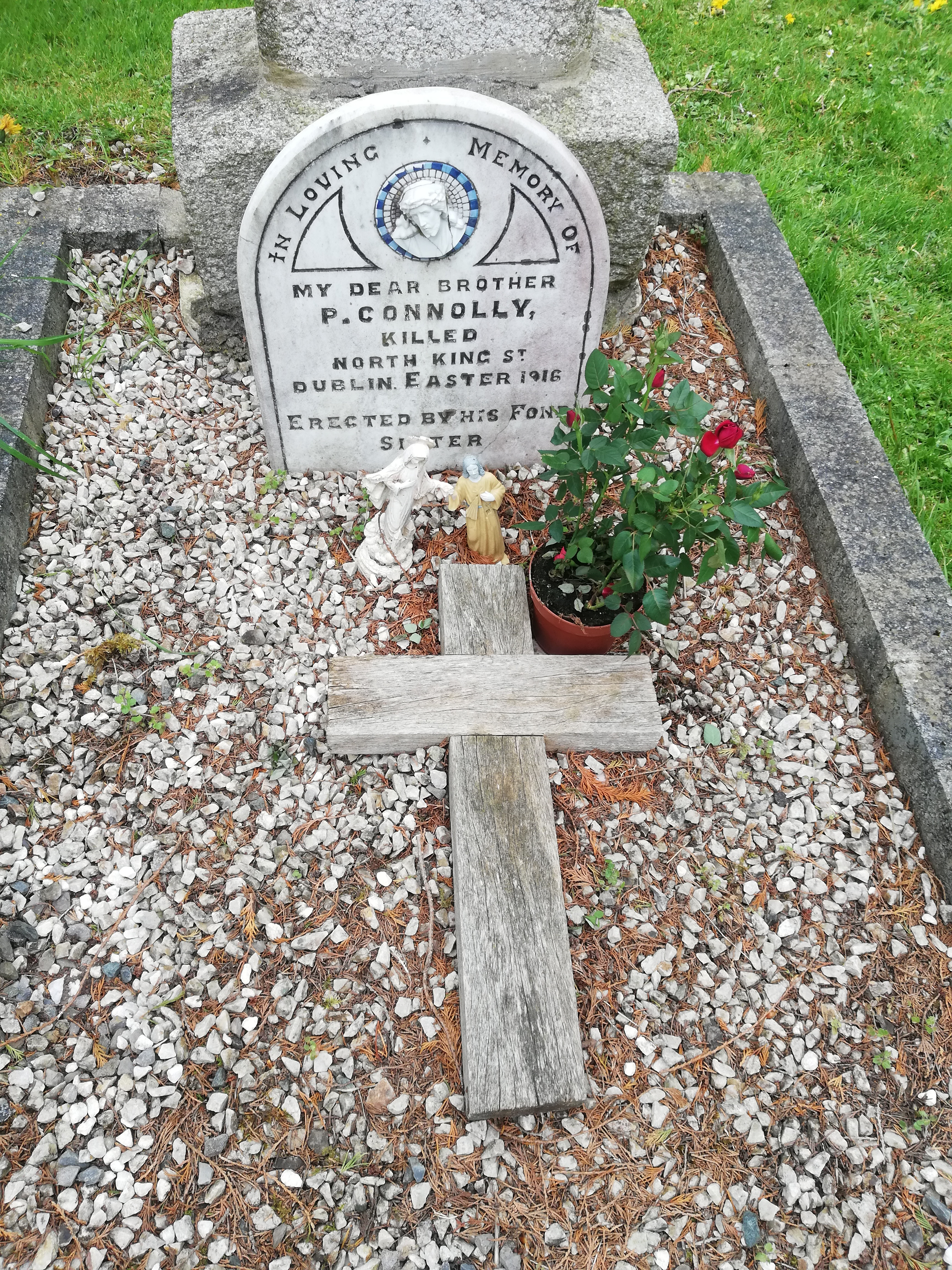
Grave in Donaghcumper, Celbridge, of Peter Connolly, one of 15 civilians murdered in the North King Street Massacre.

On Tuesday 25 April, Dubliner Francis Sheehy Skeffington, a pacifist nationalist activist, was arrested and then taken as hostage and human shield by Captain John Bowen-Colthurst; that night Bowen-Colthurst shot dead a teenage boy. Skeffington was executed the next day – alongside two journalists. Two hours later, Bowen-Colthurst captured the Labour Party councillor and IRB lieutenant, Richard O'Carroll and had him shot in the street. Major Sir Francis Vane raised concerns over Bowen-Colthurst's actions and saw to him being court martialled. Bowen-Colthurst was found guilty but insane and was sentenced to an insane asylum. Owing to political pressure, an inquiry soon transpired, revealing the murders and their cover-up. The killing of Skeffington and others provoked outrage among citizens.

The other incident was the "North King Street Massacre". On the night of 28–29 April, British soldiers of the South Staffordshire Regiment, under Colonel Henry Taylor, had burst into houses on North King Street and killed fifteen male civilians whom they accused of being rebels. The soldiers shot or bayoneted the victims, and then secretly buried some of them in cellars or backyards after robbing them. The area saw some of the fiercest fighting of the Rising and the British had taken heavy casualties for little gain. Maxwell attempted to excuse the killings and argued that the rebels were ultimately responsible. He claimed that "the rebels wore no uniform" and that the people of North King Street were rebel sympathisers. Maxwell concluded that such incidents "are absolutely unavoidable in such a business as this" and that "under the circumstance the troops [...] behaved with the greatest restraint". A private brief, prepared for the Prime Minister, said the soldiers "had orders not to take any prisoners" but took it to mean they were to shoot any suspected rebel. The City Coroner's inquest found that soldiers had killed "unarmed and unoffending" residents. The military court of inquiry ruled that no specific soldiers could be held responsible, and no action was taken.

=== Inquiry ===
A Royal Commission was set up to enquire into the causes of the Rising. It began hearings on 18 May under the chairmanship of Lord Hardinge of Penshurst. The Commission heard evidence from Sir Matthew Nathan, Augustine Birrell, Lord Wimborne, Sir Neville Chamberlain (Inspector-General of the Royal Irish Constabulary), General Lovick Friend, Major Ivor Price of Military Intelligence and others. The report, published on 26 June, was critical of the Dublin administration, saying that "Ireland for several years had been administered on the principle that it was safer and more expedient to leave the law in abeyance if collision with any faction of the Irish people could thereby be avoided." Birrell and Nathan had resigned immediately after the Rising. Wimborne resisted the pressure to resign, but was recalled to London by Asquith. He was re-appointed in July 1916. Chamberlain also resigned.

=== Reaction of the Dublin public ===
At first, many Dubliners were bewildered by the outbreak of the Rising. James Stephens, who was in Dublin during the week, thought, "None of these people were prepared for Insurrection. The thing had been sprung on them so suddenly they were unable to take sides." (Note: The Irish Times, for example, "scrambled" to report the Rising while maintaining their intended coverage of the Tercentenary of Shakespeare's birth, thus imploring readers to revise his work, along with other errands, during the "enforced domesticity" of martial law.) Eyewitnesses compared the ruin of Dublin with the destruction of towns in Europe in the war: the physical damage, which included over ninety fires, was largely confined to Sackville Street. In the immediate aftermath, the Irish government was in disarray.

There was great hostility towards the Volunteers in some parts of the city which escalated to physical violence in some instances. Historian Keith Jeffery noted that most of the opposition came from the dependents of British Army personnel. The death and destruction, which resulted in disrupted trade, considerable looting and unemployment, contributed to the antagonism of the Volunteers, who were denounced as "murderers" and "starvers of the people" – the monetary consequences of the Rising were estimated to be at £2,500,000. (Note: Soldiers' wives were reported to be starving during the Easter Week; The Dublin Metropolitan Police sought to provide bread and milk.) International aid was supplied to residents – nationalists aided the dependents of Volunteers. The British Government compensated the consequences to the sum of £2,500,000.

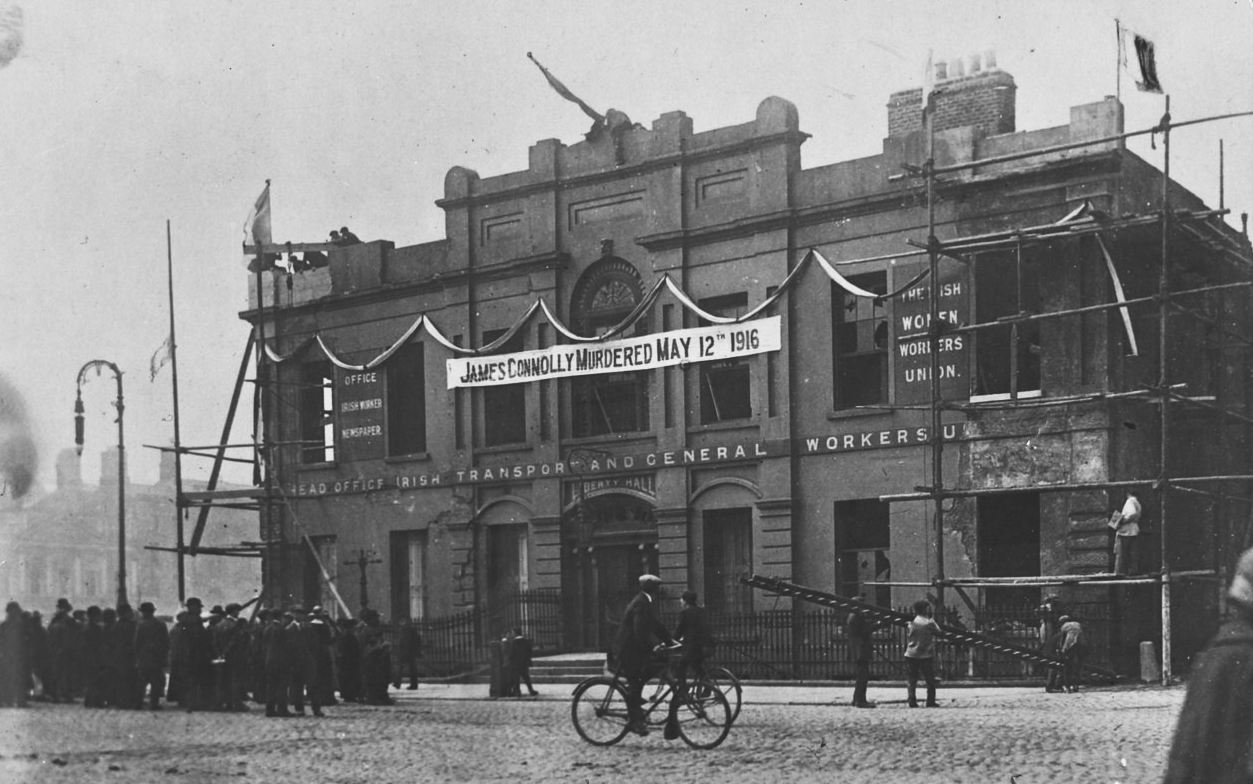
Commemoration of Connolly's execution, 12 May 1917

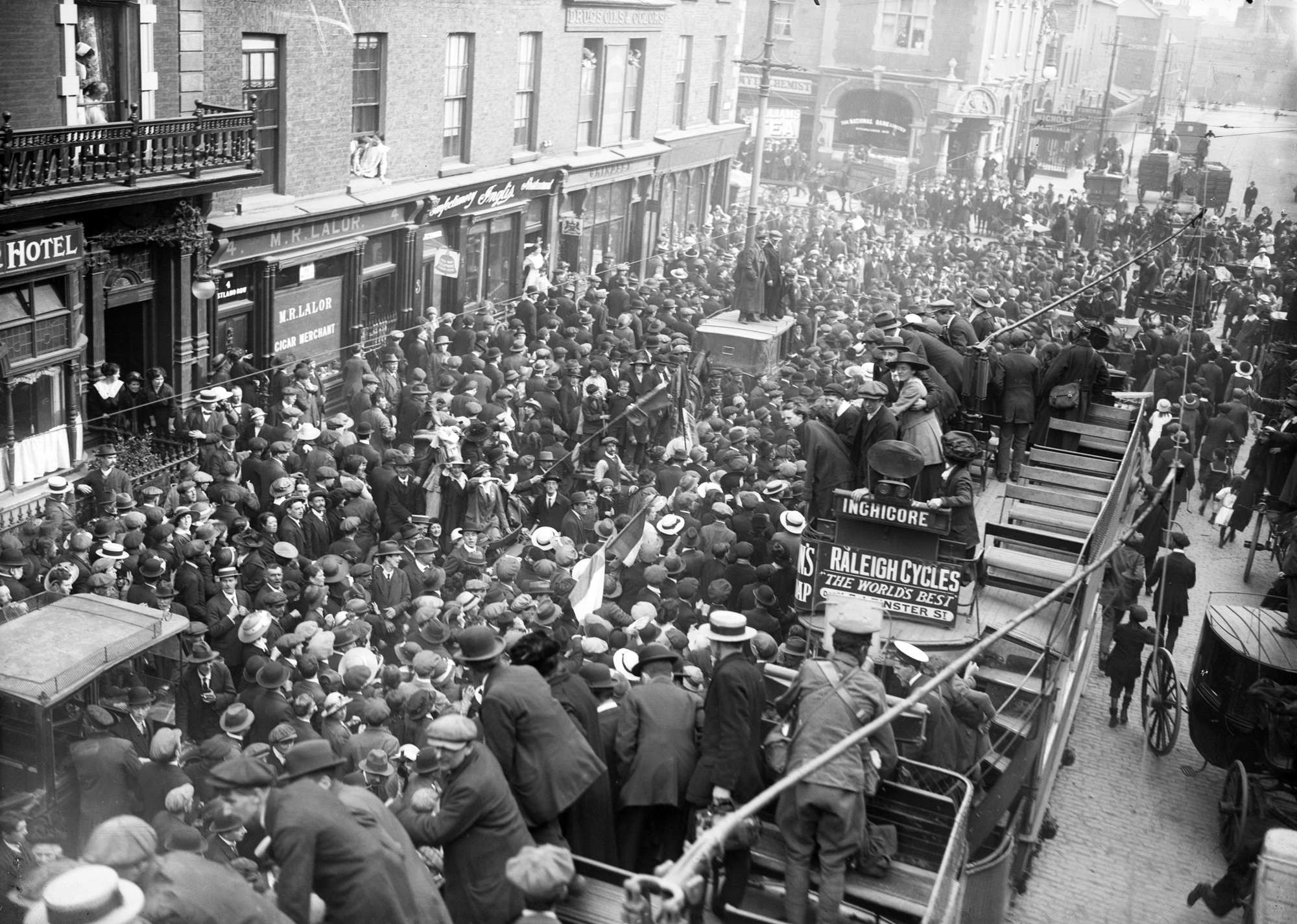
Crowds in Dublin waiting to welcome republican prisoners released in 1917

Support for the rebels did exist among Dubliners, expressed through both crowds cheering at prisoners and reverent silence. With martial law seeing this expression prosecuted, many would-be supporters elected to remain silent although "a strong undercurrent of disloyalty" was still felt. Drawing upon this support, and amidst the deluge of nationalist ephemera, the significantly popular Catholic Bulletin eulogised Volunteers killed in action and implored readers to donate; entertainment was offered as an extension of those intentions, targeting local sectors to great success. (Note: Historian Caoimhe Nic Dháibhéid wrote that "the widespread popularity of these special events was perhaps the most tangible of the shift in the politics." Peter Hart posited that the souvenirs which quickly circulated after the Rising were ultimately "more influential than revolutionary ideology and writing".) The Bulletin's Catholic character allowed it to evade the widespread censorship of press and seizure of republican propaganda; it therefore exposed many unaware readers to such propaganda.

=== Rise of Sinn Féin ===
A meeting called by George Noble Plunkett on 19 April 1917 led to the formation of a broad political movement under the banner of Sinn Féin which was formalised at the Sinn Féin Ard Fheis of 25 October 1917. The Conscription Crisis of 1918 further intensified public support for Sinn Féin before the general election to the British Parliament on 14 December 1918, which resulted in a landslide victory for Sinn Féin, winning 73 seats out of 105, whose Members of Parliament (MPs) gathered in Dublin on 21 January 1919 to form Dáil Éireann and adopt the Declaration of Independence.

During that election, they drew directly upon the Rising and their popularity was significantly accreditable to that association, one that accrued political prestige until the end of the century. Many participants of the Rising would soon assume electoral positions. Sinn Féin served as an alternative to the Irish Parliamentary Party whose support for British establishments alienated voters.

Sinn Féin would become closely aligned with the Irish Republican Army, who sought to continue the IRB's ideals and waged armed conflict against British forces.

== Legacy ==
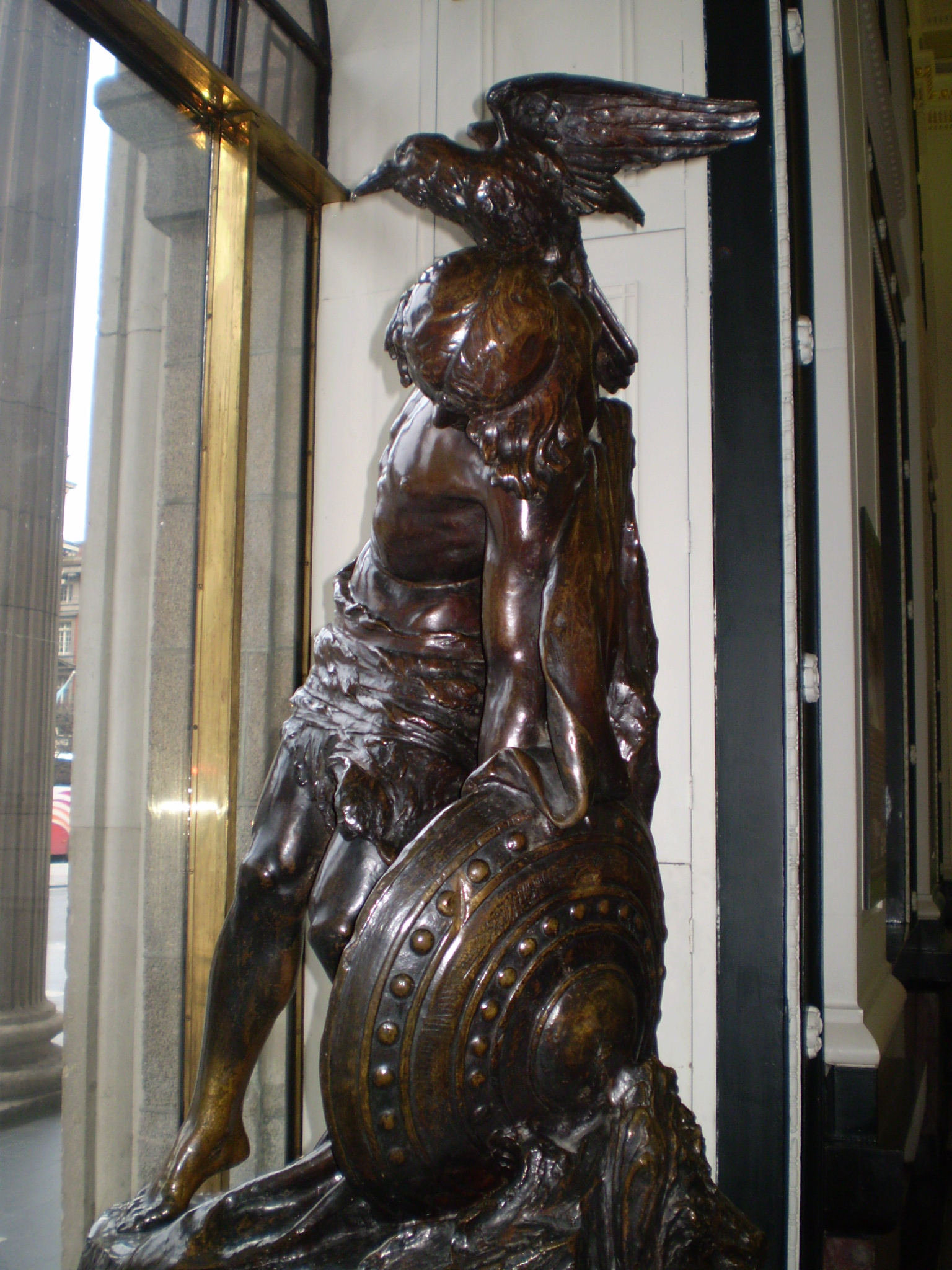
In 1935, Éamon de Valera unveiled a statue by Oliver Sheppard of the mythical Irish hero Cú Chulainn at the General Post Office to commemorate the Rising. Similar remembrance is present throughout Dublin.

1916 – containing both the Rising and the Battle of the Somme, events paramount to the collective memory of Irish Republicans and Ulster Unionists, respectively – had a profound effect on Ireland and is remembered accordingly. (Note: Following the Rising, political identity in Ireland "became much more exclusivist". The Home Rule movement's Protestant contingency was uniquely impaired by the Rising, which was lambasted as "southern Catholic treachery" by Ulster Unionists; the Home Rule Crisis unified unionists, defining protestant allegiances thereafter. These events have often been invoked as the "origin stories for the respective states of Ireland and Northern Ireland." Although remembrance rarely intersects, the established binary of these events became "much less oppressive" following the Northern Ireland peace process.) The Rising was among the events that ended colonial rule in Ireland, succeeded by the Irish War of Independence. The legacy of the Rising possess many dimensions although the declaration of the Republic and the ensuing executions remain focal points.

Annual parades in celebration of the Rising occurred for many years; however, they ceased after The Troubles in Northern Ireland began, being seen as supportive of republican paramilitary violence – the Rising is a common feature of republican murals in Northern Ireland. (Note: The republican movement found the fiftieth anniversary of the Easter Rising provided an "opportunity to stake its claim to be the true inheritor of the mantle of the revolutionaries." Ian McBride wrote that "the fiftieth anniversary of the Easter Rising spawned a new generation of republicans in Belfast.") These commemorations celebrated the Rising as the origin of the Irish state, a stance reiterated through extensive analysis. Unionists contend that the Rising was an illegal attack on the British State that should not be celebrated. Revivalism of the parades has inspired significant public debate, although the centenary of the Rising, which featured the likes of ceremonies and memorials, was largely successful and praised for its sensitivity. (Note: Unionist parties did, however, boycott the event.)

The leaders of the Rising were "instantly apotheosized" and remembrance was situated within a larger republican tradition of claimed martyrdom – the Catholic Church would contend this narrative as the foundational myth of the Irish Free State, assuming a place within the remembrance as an association between republicanism and Catholicism grew. (Note: There were few Protestant rebels present and thus the Rising became strongly associated with Catholicism. The likes of Grace Gifford, Markievicz and Casement converted from Protestantism to Catholicism just before, during and after the Rising, respectively. The Catholic character of the rebels was stressed by priests influential in the Church's acceptance of the insurgency.) The "Pearsean combination of Catholicism, Gaelicism, and spiritual nationalism" would become dominant within republicanism, the ideas gaining a quasi-religiosity, whilst helping unify later strands thereof. Within the Free State, the Rising was sanctified by officials, positioned as a "highly disciplined military operation". Historians largely agree that the Rising succeeded by offering a symbolic display of sacrifice, while the military action was a considerable failure. (Note: This historiography largely manifested around the fiftieth anniversary in defiance of a "hagiographical" perception. On the symbolic power, Sarah Cole wrote that the Easter Rising was "understood and presented, at every level, in a metaphoric language, which stressed apotheosis, resurrection, transformation." These tropes - central to the morale of the Volunteers - are evidenced in Pearse's oration at the funeral of Jeremiah O'Donovan Rossa. The occupation of areas laden with iconography but of negligible military value supports the understanding of the Rising as primarily a symbolic act.) As Monk Gibbon remarked, the "shots from khaki-uniformed firing parties did more to create the Republic of Ireland than any shot fired by a Volunteer in the course of Easter week".

Literature surrounding the Rising was significant: MacDonagh, Plunkett, and Pearse were themselves poets, whose ideals were granted a spiritual dimension in their work; Arnold Bax, Francis Ledwidge, George William Russell and W. B. Yeats responded through verse that ranged from endorsement to elegies. (Note: The executed poets possessed similar motifs: pastoral imagery, Celtic mythology, notions of saintliness, sacrifice, and martyrdom, and inspiration from English poets. Pearse equated his eminent execution, and that of Robert Emmet, with the death of Jesus Christ; patriotism with religious faith. Although there existed little anti-Anglo sentiment in their work, their radicalism was, in part, begotten from resentment at the "anglicisation" of Ireland and the resulting marginalisation of Gaelic identity. D. G. Boyce stressed the importance of the Gaelic revival upon the philosophy of the Rising which, via Pearse, aggregated and created a continuity of prior nationalist thinking.) Although James Joyce was ambivalent to the insurgence, metaphors of and imagery consistent with the Rising appear in his later work. Hugh Leonard, Denis Johnston, Tom Murphy, Roddy Doyle and Sorley MacLean are among writers would later invoke the Rising. Now extensively dramatised, its theatricality was identified in the moment and has been stressed in its remembrance. Literary and political evocation position the Rising as a "watershed moment" central to Irish history.

Black, Basque, Breton, Catalan and Indian nationalists have drawn upon the Rising and its consequences. For the latter, Jawaharlal Nehru noted, the symbolic display was the appeal, that of the transcendent, "invincible spirit of a nation"; such was broadly appealing in America, where diasporic, occasionally socialist, nationalism occurred. (Note: The broadcast declaration was intercepted and relayed to the United States thus considerable coverage in the press ensued: "The use of modern technology to declare an Irish Republic indicates an attempt to place the Rising at the heart of world affairs, which in turn reflected the rebel leader's experience as propagandists." When enacting a censorship control on the Rising, British officials sought for America, in particular, to be ignorant. Irish-American support proved remunerative for the Rising.) Vladimir Lenin was effusive, ascribing its anti-imperialism a singular significance within geopolitics – his only misgiving was its estrangement from the broader wave of revolution occurring. (Note: Although participants largely didn't espouse socialist beliefs – Connolly being a notable exception – a varied amount of left-wing organisations commented upon and thereafter disparaged the Rising. The "Connolly tradition" would later be invoked positively by socialist and labor activists in relation to their own aspirations.)

During the Troubles, significant revisionism of the Rising occurred. Revisionists contended that it was not a "heroic drama" as thought but rather informed the violence transpiring, by having legitimised a "cult of 'blood sacrifice'". With the advent of a Provisional IRA ceasefire and the beginning of what became known as the Peace Process during the 1990s, the government's view of the Rising grew more positive and in 1996 an 80th anniversary commemoration at the Garden of Remembrance in Dublin was attended by the Taoiseach and leader of Fine Gael, John Bruton.

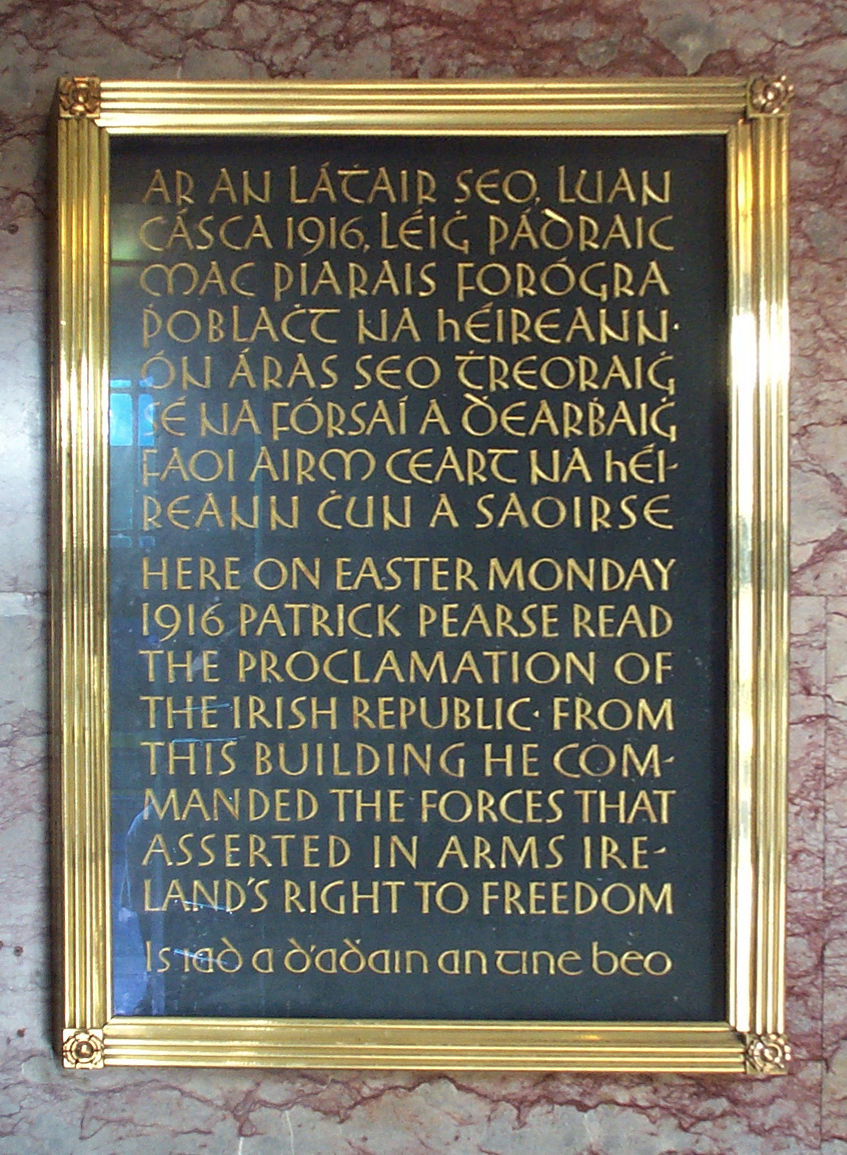
Plaque commemorating the Easter Rising at the General Post Office, Dublin, with the Irish text in Gaelic script, and the English text in regular Latin script

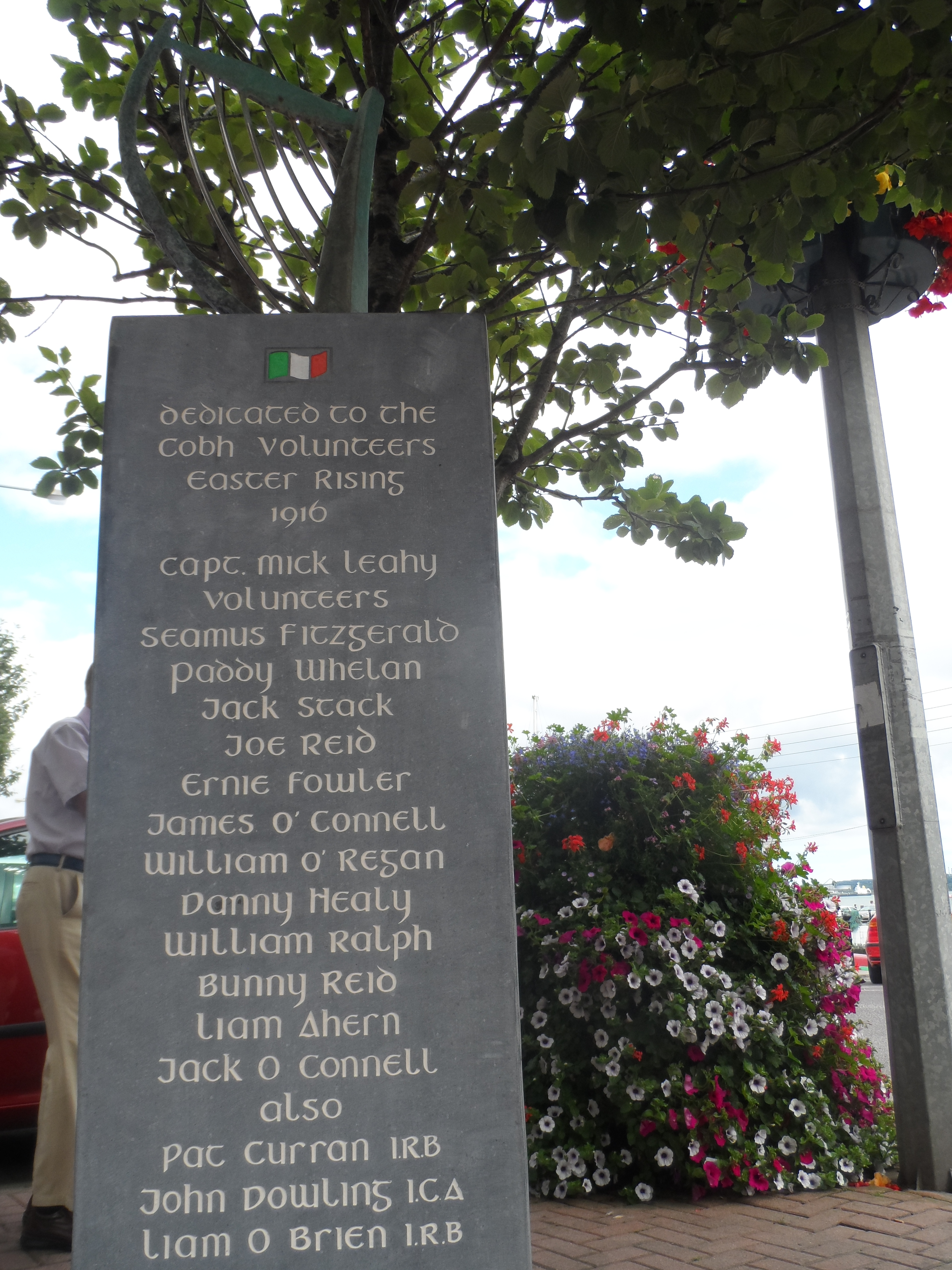
Memorial in Cobh, County Cork, to the Volunteers from that town

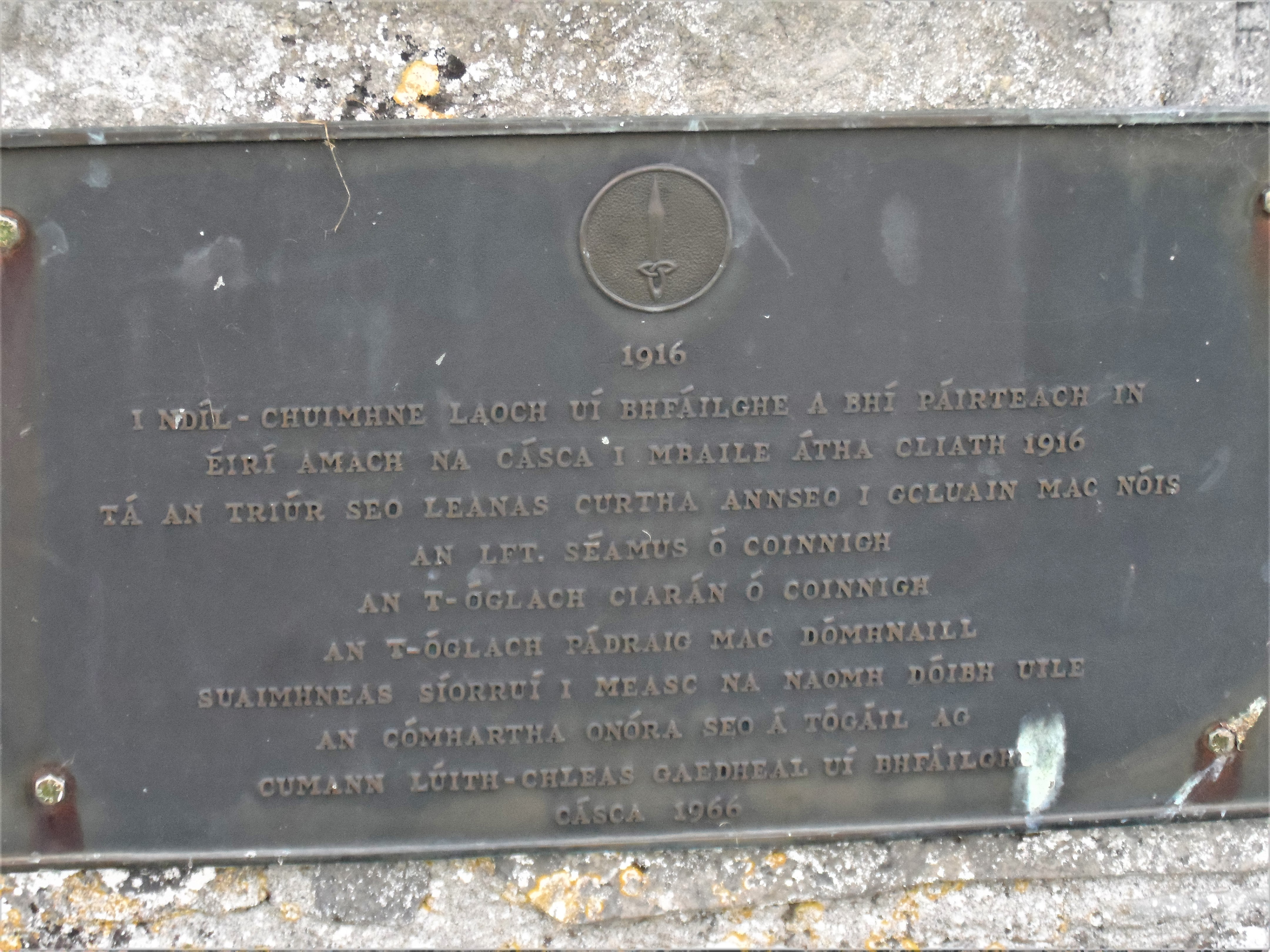
Memorial in Clonmacnoise commemorating men of County Offaly (then King's County) who fought in 1916: James Kenny, Kieran Kenny and Paddy McDonnell are named

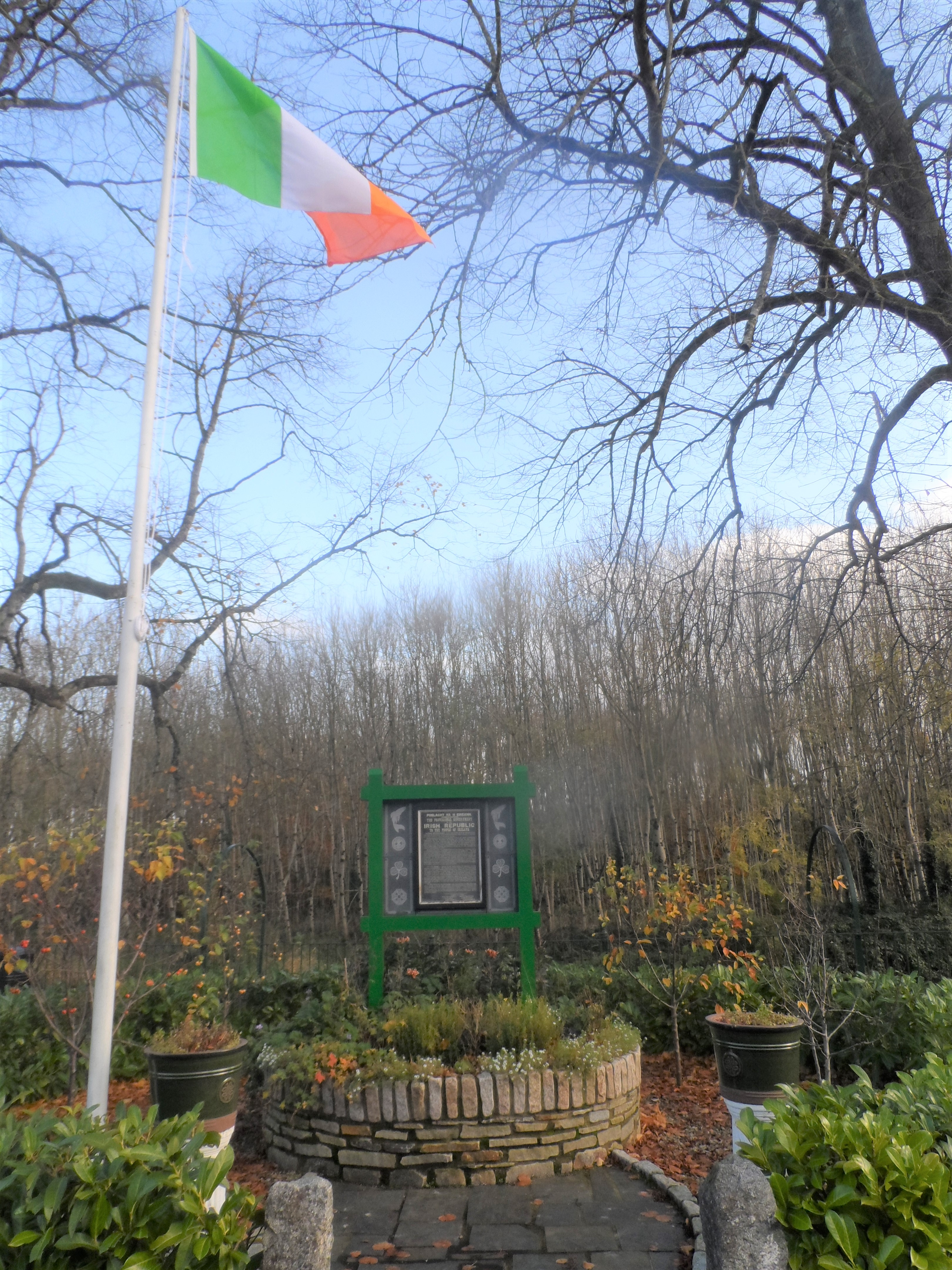
Flag and copy of the Proclamation in Clonegal

== In popular culture ==
- "Easter, 1916", a poem by the poet and playwright W. B. Yeats, published in 1921.
- "The Foggy Dew" is a song by Canon Charles O'Neill, composed during the Irish War of Independence, that eulogises the rebels of the Easter Rising.
- The Plough and the Stars is a 1926 play by Seán O'Casey that takes place during the Easter Rising.
- Insurrection is a 1950 novel by Liam O'Flaherty that takes place during the Rising.
- The Red and the Green is a 1965 novel by Iris Murdoch that covers the events leading up to and during the Easter Rising.
- Insurrection is an eight-part 1966 docudrama made by Telefís Éireann for the 50th anniversary of the Rising. It was rebroadcast during the centenary celebrations in 2016.
- "Grace" is a 1985 song about the marriage of Joseph Plunkett to Grace Gifford in Kilmainham Gaol before his execution.
- 1916, A Novel of the Irish Rebellion is a 1998 historical novel by Morgan Llywelyn.
- A Star Called Henry is a 1999 novel by Roddy Doyle that partly recounts the Easter Rising through the involvement of the novel's protagonist Henry Smart.
- At Swim, Two Boys is a 2001 novel by Irish writer Jamie O'Neill, set in Dublin before and during the 1916 Easter Rising.
- Rebel Heart, is a 2001 BBC miniseries on the life of a (fictional) nationalist from the Rising through the Irish Civil War.
- Blood Upon the Rose is a 2009 graphic novel by Gerry Hunt depicting the events of the Easter Rising.
- 1916 Seachtar na Cásca is a 2010 Irish TV documentary series based on the Easter Rising, telling about seven signatories of the rebellion.
- The Dream of the Celt is a 2012 novel by the Nobel Prize winner in Literature Mario Vargas Llosa, based on the life and death of Roger Casement including his involvement with the Rising.
- Rebellion is a 2016 mini-series about the Easter Rising.
- 1916 is a 2016 three-part documentary miniseries about the Easter Rising narrated by Liam Neeson.
- Penance is a 2018 Irish film set primarily in Donegal in 1916 and in Derry in 1969, in which the Rising is also featured.

== See also ==
- List of Irish uprisings
- Property Losses (Ireland) Committee

== Sources ==
- Augusteijn, Joost (ed.)The Memoirs of John M. Regan, a Catholic Officer in the RIC and RUC, 1909–48, Witnessed Rising, ISBN 978-1-84682-069-4.
- Arrington, Lauren (2015). Revolutionary Lives. Princeton University Press. p. 125. doi:10.2307/j.ctvc776nf. ISBN 978-1-4008-7418-7.
- Bell, J. Bowyer (1998). The Secret Army: The IRA. Poolbeg. ISBN 1-85371-813-0.
- Boyce, David George, ed. (1996). The Making of Modern Irish History: Revisionism and the Revisionist Controversy. Routledge. ISBN 978-0-415-12171-2.
- Caulfield, Max (1995). The Easter Rebellion, Dublin 1916. Roberts Rinehart Publishers. ISBN 1-57098-042-X.
- Clayton, Xander (2007). Aud. Plymouth: GAC. ISBN 9780955562204.
- Coogan, Tim Pat, 1916: The Easter Rising (2001) ISBN 0-304-35902-5
- Coogan, Tim Pat, The IRA (2nd ed. 2000), ISBN 0-00-653155-5
- De Rosa, Peter. Rebels: The Irish Rising of 1916. Fawcett Columbine, New York. 1990. ISBN 0-449-90682-5
- Eberspächer, Cord/Wiechmann, Gerhard: "Erfolg Revolution kann Krieg entscheiden". Der Einsatz von S.M.H. LIBAU im irischen Osteraufstand 1916 ("Successful revolution may decide war". The use of S.M.H. LIBAU in the Irish Easter rising 1916), in: Schiff & Zeit, Nr. 67, Frühjahr 2008, S. 2–16.
- Ellis, Peter Berresford (2008). "1916: Insurrection or Rebellion? Making Judgements". In O'Donnell, Ruán (ed.). The Impact of the 1916 Rising: Among the Nations. Dublin: Irish Academic Press. ISBN 978-0-7165-2965-1.
- Feeney, Brian (2002). Sinn Féin: A Hundred Turbulent Years. O'Brien Press. ISBN 0-86278-695-9.
- Flanagan, Frances (2015). Remembering the Revolution: Dissent, Culture, and Nationalism in the Irish Free State. Oxford University Press. ISBN 978-0198739159.
- Foster, R. F. Vivid Faces: The Revolutionary Generation in Ireland, 1890–1923 (2015) excerpt Archived 14 July 2020 at the Wayback Machine
- Foy, Michael and Barton, Brian, The Easter Rising ISBN 0-7509-2616-3
- Grayson, Richard S.; McGarry, Fearghal, eds. (2016). Remembering 1916: The Easter Rising, the Somme and the Politics of Memory in Ireland (1 ed.). Cambridge University Press. doi:10.1017/cbo9781316550403. ISBN 978-1-107-14590-0.
- Grayson, Richard S. (2018). Dublin's Great Wars: The First World War, the Easter Rising and the Irish Revolution (1 ed.). Cambridge University Press. doi:10.1017/9781139248877. ISBN 978-1-139-24887-7.
- Greaves, C. Desmond, The Life and Times of James Connolly
- Hennessey, Thomas (1998). Dividing Ireland, World War I and Partition: The passing of the Home Rule Bill. Routledge. ISBN 0-415-17420-1.
- Jackson, Alvin (2003). Home Rule, an Irish History 1800–2000. Phoenix Press. ISBN 0-7538-1767-5.
- The Irish Times (1998) [1917]. 1916 Rebellion Handbook. Introduction by Declan Kiberd (reprint ed.). Mourne River Press. ISBN 9781902090054.
- Kee, Robert (2000). The Green Flag: A History of Irish Nationalism. Penguin Books. ISBN 0-14-029165-2.
- Kennedy, Christopher M. (2010). Genesis of the Rising, 1912–1916: A Transformation of Nationalist Opinion. Peter Lang. ISBN 978-1433105005. Archived from the original on 26 February 2017 – via Google Books.
- Kostick, Conor & Collins, Lorcan, The Easter Rising, A Guide to Dublin in 1916 ISBN 0-86278-638-X
- Lyons, F.S.L., Ireland Since the Famine ISBN 0-00-633200-5
- Macardle, Dorothy, The Irish Republic (Dublin 1951)
- MacDonagh, Oliver (1977). Ireland: The Union and its aftermath. George Allen & Unwin. ISBN 0-04-941004-0.
- Maguire, Martin (2013). The Civil Service and the Revolution in Ireland 1912–1938: 'Shaking the Blood-Stained Hand of Mr Collins'. Manchester University Press. p. 31. ISBN 978-1-84779-378-2.
- McGarry, Fearghal (2010). The Rising: Ireland Easter 1916. Oxford University Press. ISBN 978-0192801869.
- McNally, Michael; Peter, Dennis (2007). Easter Rising 1916: Birth of the Irish Republic. London: Osprey Publishing. ISBN 978-1-84603-067-3.
- Moran, Seán Farrell (1994). Patrick Pearse and the Politics of Redemption. Catholic University of America Press. ISBN 978-0-81320-912-8.
- Moran, Seán Farrell (1989). "Patrick Pearse and the European Revolt Against Reason". Journal of the History of Ideas. 50 (4): 625–643. doi:10.2307/2709801. JSTOR 2709801.
- Morrissey, Conor (2019). Protestant Nationalists in Ireland, 1900–1923 (1 ed.). Cambridge University Press. doi:10.1017/9781108596251. ISBN 978-1-108-59625-1. S2CID 211456832.
- Murphy, William (2014). Political Imprisonment and the Irish, 1912-1921. Oxford University Press. ISBN 978-0-19-956907-6.
- Neeson, Eoin (2007). Myths from Easter 1916. Cork: Aubane Historical Society. ISBN 978-1-903497-34-0.
- "Patrick Pearse and Patriotic Soteriology," in Yonah Alexander and Alan O'Day, eds, The Irish Terrorism Experience, (Aldershot: Dartmouth) 1991
- Ó Broin, Leon, Dublin Castle & the 1916 Rising, Sidgwick & Jackson, 1970
- O'Leary, Brendan (2019). A Treatise on Northern Ireland, Volume I: Colonialism. Oxford University Press. p. 320. ISBN 978-0199243341.
- Royal Commission on the Rebellion in Ireland (1916). Report. Command papers. Vol. Cd.8279. London: HMSO. Archived from the original on 26 October 2016.
- Royal Commission on the Rebellion in Ireland (1916). Minutes of Evidence and Appendix of Documents. Command papers. Vol. Cd.8311. London: HMSO.
- Ryan, Annie (2009). Witnesses: Inside the Easter Rising. Liberties Press. ISBN 978-1905483709.
- Stephens, James (1992). The Insurrection in Dublin. Colin Smythe Ltd. ISBN 978-0861403585.
- Townshend, Charles (2006). Easter 1916: The Irish Rebellion. London: Ivan R. Dee Inc. ISBN 978-1566637046.
