= August 1 =

August 1 this year in various calendars
- Saturday, 1 August 2026
Akan	Kwamemene
Armenian	12 Nawasardi 1476
Aztec	Pānquetzaliztli 3, 9 Ozomahtli
Babylonian	17 Du'uzu, 2337 SE
Balinese pawukon	Luang, Pepet, Beteng, Sri, Keliwon, Was, Saniscara of Krulut, Ludra, Tulus, Raja
Bengali	17 Shrabon, BS 1433
Chinese	Yin Fire Goat・Girl Mansion; Fire Horse Year, Month 6, Day 19 (Dashu, 6 days until Liqiu)
Common Era	1 August 2026 CE
Coptic	25 Epip, AM 1742
Egyptian	17 Choiak, 2775 NE
Ethiopian	25 Ḥamlē, 2018 Amätä Məhrät
French Republican	Décade II, Quartidi de Thermidor de l'Année 234 de la République
Gregorian	1 August, AD 2026
Hebrew	18 Av, AM 5786
Hindu	Śatabhiṣaj・Saubhāgya; Solar: 16 Śrāvaṇa, 1948 SE; Lunisolar: Tr̥tīyā, Kṛishna pakṣa of Āṣāḍha, 2083 VE; Rāudra・5127 KY・1,872,788
Icelandic	Laugardagur, 7 Heyannir 2026
Islamic	16 Safar, AH 1448 (using tabular method)
ISO week date	2026-W31-6
Japanese	19 Minazuki, Reiwa 8 (Taisho, 6 days until Risshū)
Julian	19 July, AD 2026 (AM 7534)
Julian day	2461254
Korean	19 Yangdal, 4359 DE
Maya	13.0.13.14.11; 4 Yaxkin, 9 Chuen
Roman	ante diem XIV Kalendas Augustas, MMDCCLXXIX AUC
Solar Hijri	10 Mordad, SH 1405
Tibetan	18 chu stod, me pho rta 2153 or 1772 or 1000

<<	August					>>
Su	Mo	Tu	We	Th	Fr	Sa
						1
2	3	4	5	6	7	8
9	10	11	12	13	14	15
16	17	18	19	20	21	22
23	24	25	26	27	28	29
30	31
2026

August 1 in recent years
2026 (Saturday)
2025 (Friday)
2024 (Thursday)
2023 (Tuesday)
2022 (Monday)
2021 (Sunday)
2020 (Saturday)
2019 (Thursday)
2018 (Wednesday)
2017 (Tuesday)

August 1 is the 213th day of the year (214th in leap years) in the Gregorian calendar; 152 days remain until the end of the year.

== Events ==
=== Pre-1600 ===
- AD 314 – The first synod of Arles is opened by bishop Marinus of Arles.
- 902 – Taormina, the last Byzantine stronghold in Sicily, is captured by the Aghlabid army, concluding the Muslim conquest of Sicily.
- 1291 – The Old Swiss Confederacy is formed with the signature of the Federal Charter, later remembered as the Swiss National Day.
- 1571 – The Ottoman conquest of Cyprus concludes with Venetian surrender in the Siege of Famagusta.

=== 1601–1900 ===
- 1664 – Ottoman forces are defeated in the battle of Saint Gotthard by an Austrian army led by Raimondo Montecuccoli, resulting in the Peace of Vasvár.
- 1714 – George, Elector of Hanover, becomes King George I of Great Britain, marking the beginning of the Georgian era of British history.
- 1759 – Seven Years' War: The Battle of Minden, an allied Anglo-German army victory over the French. In Britain this was one of a number of events that constituted the Annus Mirabilis of 1759 and is celebrated as Minden Day by certain British Army regiments.
- 1798 – French Revolutionary Wars: Battle of the Nile (Battle of Aboukir Bay): Battle begins when a British fleet engages the French Revolutionary Navy fleet in an unusual night action.
- 1800 – The Acts of Union 1800 are passed which merge the Kingdom of Great Britain and the Kingdom of Ireland into the United Kingdom of Great Britain and Ireland.
- 1801 – First Barbary War: The American schooner USS Enterprise captures the Tripolitan polacca Tripoli in a single-ship action off the coast of modern-day Libya.
- 1834 – Slavery is abolished in the British Empire as the Slavery Abolition Act 1833 comes into force, although it remains legal in the possessions of the East India Company until the passage of the Indian Slavery Act, 1843.
- 1842 – The Lombard Street riot erupts in Philadelphia, Pennsylvania, United States.
- 1849 – Joven Daniel wrecks at the coast of Araucanía, Chile, leading to allegations that local Mapuche tribes murdered survivors and kidnapped Elisa Bravo.
- 1894 – The Empire of Japan and Qing China declare war on each other after a week of fighting over Korea, formally inaugurating the First Sino-Japanese War.

=== 1901–present ===
- 1915 – Patrick Pearse gives his speech "Ireland unfree shall never be at peace" at O'Donovan Rossa's funeral in Dublin.
- 1927 – The Nanchang Uprising marks the first significant battle in the Chinese Civil War between the Kuomintang and Chinese Communist Party. This day is commemorated as the anniversary of the founding of the People's Liberation Army.
- 1933 – Ending the events of Altona Bloody Sunday, anti-Fascist activists Bruno Tesch, Walter Möller, Karl Wolff and August Lütgens are the first political targets executed by the Nazi regime.
- 1936 – The 1936 Summer Olympics open in Berlin with a ceremony presided over by Adolf Hitler.
- 1943 – World War II: Operation Tidal Wave, also known as "Black Sunday", is an American attempt to destroy Romanian oil fields at Ploiești.
- 1944 – World War II: The Warsaw Uprising against the Nazi German occupation breaks out in Warsaw, Poland.
- 1950 – Guam is organized as an unincorporated territory of the United States as the President Harry S. Truman signs the Guam Organic Act.
- 1960 – Dahomey (later renamed Benin) declares independence from France, celebrating its Independence Day for the first time.
- 1964 – The former Belgian Congo is renamed the Democratic Republic of the Congo by the enactment of the Luluabourg Constitution.
- 1966 – Charles Whitman kills 15 people at the University of Texas at Austin before being killed by the police.
- 1966 – Purges of intellectuals and imperialists becomes official policy in China, starting Red August at the beginning of the Cultural Revolution.
- 1971 – The Concert for Bangladesh, organized by former Beatle George Harrison, is held at Madison Square Garden in New York City.
- 1975 – The Helsinki Accords, the final act of the Conference on Security and Co-operation in Europe meeting, is signed in Helsinki, Finland, advancing the process of Cold War détente.
- 1980 – A train crash kills 18 people and injures over 170 more in County Cork, Ireland.
- 1988 – A British soldier is killed in the Inglis Barracks bombing in London, England.
- 1990 – A plane crash in the Karabakh Range kills 46 people.
- 1993 – The Great Mississippi and Missouri Rivers Flood of 1993 comes to a peak.
- 1998 – Puntland, an autonomous state in northeastern Somalia, is officially established following a constitutional conference in Garowe. Issims and tribal chiefs agreed to create a self-declared government until Somalia recovered.
- 2004 – A supermarket fire kills 424 people and injures 360 others in Asunción, Paraguay.
- 2007 – The I-35W Mississippi River bridge spanning the Mississippi River in Minneapolis, Minnesota, collapses during the evening rush hour, killing 13 people and injuring 145.
- 2008 – Eleven mountaineers from international expeditions die on K2, the second-highest mountain on Earth, in the worst single accident in the history of K2 mountaineering.
- 2017 – A suicide attack on a mosque in Herat, Afghanistan kills 33 people.
- 2023 – Former US President Donald Trump is indicted for his role in the January 6 United States Capitol attack, his third indictment in 2023.

== Births ==
=== Pre-1600 ===
- 10 BC – Claudius, Roman emperor (died 54)
- 126 – Pertinax, Roman emperor (died 193)
- 845 – Sugawara no Michizane, Japanese scholar and politician (died 903)
- 1313 – Kōgon, Japanese emperor (died 1364)
- 1385 – John Fitzalan, 6th Earl of Arundel, English nobleman (died 1421)
- 1410 – John IV, Count of Nassau-Siegen, German count (died 1475)
- 1492 – Wolfgang, Prince of Anhalt-Köthen, German prince (died 1566)
- 1520 – Sigismund II, Polish king (died 1572)
- 1545 – Andrew Melville, Scottish theologian and scholar (died 1622)
- 1552 – Isabella Feltria della Rovere, Italian noblewoman (died 1619)
- 1555 – Edward Kelley, English spirit medium (died 1597)
- 1579 – Luis Vélez de Guevara, Spanish author and playwright (died 1644)

=== 1601–1900 ===
- 1626 – Sabbatai Zevi, Montenegrin rabbi and mystic (died 1676)
- 1630 – Thomas Clifford, 1st Baron Clifford of Chudleigh, English politician, Lord High Treasurer (died 1673)
- 1659 – Sebastiano Ricci, Italian painter (died 1734)
- 1713 – Charles I, German duke and prince (died 1780)
- 1714 – Richard Wilson, Welsh painter and academic (died 1782)
- 1738 – Jacques François Dugommier, French general (died 1794)
- 1744 – Jean-Baptiste Lamarck, French soldier, biologist, and academic (died 1829)
- 1770 – William Clark, American soldier, explorer, and politician, 4th Governor of Missouri Territory (died 1838)
- 1779 – Francis Scott Key, American lawyer, author, and poet (died 1843)
- 1779 – Lorenz Oken, German-Swiss botanist, biologist, and ornithologist (died 1851)
- 1809 – William B. Travis, American colonel and lawyer (died 1836)
- 1815 – Richard Henry Dana Jr., American lawyer and politician (died 1882)
- 1818 – Maria Mitchell, American astronomer and academic (died 1889)
- 1819 – Herman Melville, American novelist, short story writer, and poet (died 1891)
- 1831 – Antonio Cotogni, Italian opera singer and educator (died 1918)
- 1843 – Robert Todd Lincoln, American lawyer and politician, 35th United States Secretary of War (died 1926)
- 1856 – George Coulthard, Australian footballer and cricketer (died 1883)
- 1858 – Gaston Doumergue, French lawyer and politician, 13th President of France (died 1937)
- 1858 – Hans Rott, Austrian organist and composer (died 1884)
- 1860 – Bazil Assan, Romanian engineer and explorer (died 1918)
- 1862 – M.R. James English medievalist scholar and author (died 1936)
- 1865 – Isobel Lilian Gloag, English painter (died 1917)
- 1866 – Louis Lapicque, French neuroscientist known for the integrate-and-fire model of the nervous system (died 1952)
- 1870 – Ilya Ivanov, Soviet biologist who specialized in the field of artificial insemination (died 1932)
- 1871 – John Lester, American cricketer and soccer player (died 1969)
- 1877 – George Hackenschmidt, Estonian-English wrestler and strongman (died 1968)
- 1881 – Otto Toeplitz, German mathematician and academic (died 1940)
- 1885 – George de Hevesy, Hungarian-German chemist and academic, Nobel Prize laureate (died 1966)
- 1889 – Walter Gerlach, German physicist and academic (died 1979)
- 1889 – John Friend Mahoney, American physician who pioneered the treatment of syphilis with penicillin (died 1957)
- 1891 – Karl Kobelt, Swiss lawyer and politician, 52nd President of the Swiss Confederation (died 1968)
- 1893 – Alexander of Greece, king of Greece (died 1920)
- 1894 – Ottavio Bottecchia, Italian cyclist (died 1927)
- 1898 – Morris Stoloff, American composer and musical director (died 1980)
- 1899 – Raymond Mays, English race car driver and businessman (died 1980)
- 1900 – Otto Nothling, Australian cricketer and rugby player (died 1965)

=== 1901–present ===
- 1901 – Francisco Guilledo, Filipino boxer (died 1925)
- 1903 – Paul Horgan, American historian, author, and academic (died 1995)
- 1905 – Helen Sawyer Hogg, American-Canadian astronomer and academic (died 1993)
- 1907 – Eric Shipton, Sri Lankan-English mountaineer and explorer (died 1977)
- 1910 – James Henry Govier, English painter and etcher (died 1974)
- 1910 – Raymond A. Palmer, American author and magazine editor (died 1977)
- 1910 – Walter Scharf, American pianist and composer (died 2003)
- 1910 – Gerda Taro, German war photographer (died 1937)
- 1911 – Jackie Ormes, American journalist and cartoonist (died 1985)
- 1912 – David Brand, Australian politician, 19th Premier of Western Australia (died 1979)
- 1912 – Gego, German-Venezuelan sculptor and academic (died 1994)
- 1912 – Henry Jones, American actor (died 1999)
- 1914 – Jack Delano, American photographer and composer (died 1997)
- 1914 – Alan Moore, Australian painter and educator (died 2015)
- 1914 – J. Lee Thompson, English-Canadian director, producer, and screenwriter (died 2002)
- 1916 – Fiorenzo Angelini, Italian cardinal (died 2014)
- 1916 – Anne Hébert, Canadian author and poet (died 2000)
- 1918 – T. J. Jemison, American minister and activist (died 2013)
- 1919 – Stanley Middleton, English author (died 2009)
- 1920 – Henrietta Lacks, African-American tobacco farmer whose cancer cells are the source of the HeLa cell line (died 1951)
- 1920 – Raul Renter, Estonian economist and chess player (died 1992)
- 1920 – James Mourilyan Tanner, British paediatric endocrinologist (died 2010)
- 1921 – Jack Kramer, American tennis player, sailor, and sportscaster (died 2009)
- 1921 – Pat McDonald, Australian actress (died 1990)
- 1922 – Arthur Hill, Canadian-American actor (died 2006)
- 1924 – Abdullah of Saudi Arabia, King of Saudi Arabia (died 2015)
- 1924 – Georges Charpak, Polish-French physicist who invented and developed subatomic particle detectors (died 2010)
- 1924 – Frank Havens, American canoeist (died 2018)
- 1924 – Marcia Mae Jones, American actress and singer (died 2007)
- 1924 – Frank Worrell, Barbadian cricketer (died 1967)
- 1925 – Ernst Jandl, Austrian poet and author (died 2000)
- 1926 – George Habash, Palestinian politician, founder of the PFLP (died 2008)
- 1926 – Hannah Hauxwell, English TV personality (died 2018)
- 1927 – María Teresa López Boegeholz, Chilean oceanographer (died 2006)
- 1927 – Anthony G. Bosco, American bishop (died 2013)
- 1928 – Jack Shea, American director, producer, and screenwriter (died 2013)
- 1929 – Leila Abashidze, Georgian actress (died 2018)
- 1929 – Hafizullah Amin, Afghan educator and politician, Afghan Minister of Foreign Affairs (died 1979)
- 1929 – Ann Calvello, American roller derby racer (died 2006)
- 1930 – Lionel Bart, English composer (died 1999)
- 1930 – Pierre Bourdieu, French sociologist, anthropologist, and philosopher (died 2002)
- 1930 – Julie Bovasso, American actress and writer (died 1991)
- 1930 – Lawrence Eagleburger, American lieutenant and politician, 62nd United States Secretary of State (died 2011)
- 1930 – Károly Grósz, Hungarian politician, 51st Prime Minister of Hungary (died 1996)
- 1930 – Geoffrey Holder, Trinidadian-American actor, singer, dancer, and choreographer (died 2014)
- 1931 – Ramblin' Jack Elliott, American singer-songwriter and guitarist
- 1931 – Trevor Goddard, South African cricketer (died 2016)
- 1932 – Meir Kahane, American-Israeli rabbi and activist, founded the Jewish Defense League (died 1990)
- 1933 – Dom DeLuise, American actor, singer, director, and producer (died 2009)
- 1933 – Masaichi Kaneda, Japanese baseball player and manager (died 2019)
- 1933 – Meena Kumari, Indian actress (died 1972)
- 1933 – Dušan Třeštík, Czech historian and author (died 2007)
- 1934 – Derek Birdsall, English graphic designer (died 2024)
- 1935 – Geoff Pullar, English cricketer (died 2014)
- 1936 – Brian M. Fagan, British archaeologist and writer (died 2025)
- 1936 – W. D. Hamilton, British biologist, psychologist, and academic (died 2000)
- 1936 – Yves Saint Laurent, Algerian-French fashion designer, co-founded Yves Saint Laurent (died 2008)
- 1936 – Laurie Taylor, English sociologist, radio host, and academic
- 1937 – Al D'Amato, American lawyer and politician
- 1939 – Bob Frankford, English-Canadian physician and politician (died 2015)
- 1939 – Terry Kiser, American actor
- 1939 – Stephen Sykes, English bishop and theologian (died 2014)
- 1939 – Robert James Waller, American author and photographer (died 2017)
- 1940 – Henry Silverman, American businessman, founded Cendant
- 1941 – Ron Brown, American politician, 30th United States Secretary of Commerce (died 1996)
- 1941 – Étienne Roda-Gil, French songwriter and screenwriter (died 2004)
- 1942 – Jerry Garcia, American singer-songwriter and guitarist (died 1995)
- 1942 – Giancarlo Giannini, Italian actor, director, producer, and screenwriter
- 1945 – Jens Juul Holst, Danish physician and physiologist known for discovering GLP-1
- 1945 – Douglas Osheroff, American physicist and academic, Nobel Prize laureate
- 1946 – Boz Burrell, English singer-songwriter, bass player, and guitarist (died 2006)
- 1947 – Lorna Goodison, Jamaican poet and author
- 1947 – Chantal Montellier, French comics creator and artist
- 1948 – Avi Arad, Israeli-American screenwriter and producer, founded Marvel Studios
- 1948 – Cliff Branch, American football player (died 2019)
- 1948 – David Gemmell, English journalist and author (died 2006)
- 1949 – Bettina Arndt, Australian writer and commentator
- 1949 – Kurmanbek Bakiyev, Kyrgyzstani politician, 2nd President of Kyrgyzstan
- 1949 – Jim Carroll, American poet, author, and musician (died 2009)
- 1951 – Tim Bachman, Canadian singer-songwriter and guitarist (died 2023)
- 1951 – Tommy Bolin, American singer-songwriter and guitarist (died 1976)
- 1952 – Zoran Đinđić, Serbian philosopher and politician, 6th Prime Minister of Serbia (died 2003)
- 1953 – Robert Cray, American blues singer-songwriter and guitarist
- 1953 – Howard Kurtz, American journalist and author
- 1954 – Trevor Berbick, Jamaican-Canadian boxer (died 2006)
- 1954 – James Gleick, American journalist and author
- 1954 – Benno Möhlmann, German footballer and manager
- 1956 – Doug Burgum, American businessman and politician
- 1957 – Anne-Marie Hutchinson, British lawyer (died 2020)
- 1957 – Taylor Negron, American actor and screenwriter (died 2015)
- 1958 – Kiki Vandeweghe, American basketball player and coach
- 1960 – Chuck D, American rapper and songwriter
- 1962 – Jacob Matlala, South African boxer (died 2013)
- 1963 – Demián Bichir, Mexican-American actor and producer
- 1963 – Coolio, American rapper, producer, and actor (died 2022)
- 1963 – John Carroll Lynch, American actor
- 1963 – Koichi Wakata, Japanese astronaut and engineer
- 1965 – Sam Mendes, English director and producer
- 1967 – José Padilha, Brazilian director, producer and screenwriter
- 1969 – Graham Thorpe, English cricketer and journalist (died 2024)
- 1973 – Gregg Berhalter, American soccer player and coach
- 1973 – Edurne Pasaban, Spanish mountaineer
- 1974 – Dennis Lawrence, Trinidadian footballer and coach
- 1974 – Beckie Scott, Canadian skier
- 1975 – Vhrsti, Czech author and illustrator
- 1976 – Don Hertzfeldt, American animator, producer, screenwriter, and voice actor
- 1976 – Nwankwo Kanu, Nigerian footballer
- 1977 – Marc Denis, Canadian ice hockey player and sportscaster
- 1978 – Björn Ferry, Swedish biathlete
- 1979 – Jason Momoa, American actor, director, and producer
- 1980 – Romain Barras, French decathlete
- 1981 – Jamie Jones-Buchanan, English rugby player and coach
- 1984 – Bastian Schweinsteiger, German footballer
- 1985 – Stuart Holden, Scottish-American soccer player
- 1986 – Marissa Paternoster, American artist, singer and guitarist
- 1986 – Elena Vesnina, Russian tennis player
- 1987 – Karen Carney, English women's footballer
- 1987 – Taapsee Pannu, Indian actress
- 1987 – Sébastien Pocognoli, Belgian footballer
- 1988 – Travis Boak, Australian footballer
- 1988 – Nemanja Matić, Serbian footballer
- 1989 – Madison Bumgarner, American baseball player
- 1989 – Tiffany Young, Korean American singer, songwriter, and actress
- 1990 – Aledmys Díaz, Cuban baseball player
- 1991 – Piotr Malarczyk, Polish footballer
- 1991 – Marco Puntoriere, Italian footballer
- 1992 – Austin Rivers, American basketball player
- 1992 – Mrunal Thakur, Indian actress
- 1993 – Álex Abrines, Spanish basketball player
- 1993 – Leon Thomas III, American actor and singer
- 1993 – Saleh Gomaa, Egyptian footballer
- 1994 – Sergeal Petersen, South African rugby player
- 1994 – Ayaka Wada, Japanese singer
- 1995 – Madison Cawthorn, American politician
- 1996 – Katie Boulter, British tennis player
- 2000 – Kim Chaewon, South Korean singer
- 2001 – Scottie Barnes, American basketball player
- 2001 – Park Si-eun, South Korean actress
- 2001 – Ben Trbojevic, Australian rugby league player
- 2002 – Alejandro Francés, Spanish footballer
- 2003 – Joseph Sua'ali'i, Australian-Samoan rugby league player

== Deaths ==
=== Pre-1600 ===
- 30 BC – Mark Antony, Roman general and politician (born 83 BC)
- 527 – Justin I, Byzantine emperor (born 450)
- 690s – Jonatus, abbot and saint
- 946 – Ali ibn Isa al-Jarrah, Abbasid vizier (born 859)
- 946 – Lady Xu Xinyue, Chinese royal concubine (born 902)
- 953 – Yingtian, Chinese Khitan empress (born 879)
- 984 – Æthelwold, bishop of Winchester
- 1098 – Adhemar of Le Puy, French bishop, crusader, and papal legate
- 1137 – Louis VI, king of France (born 1081)
- 1146 – Vsevolod II of Kiev, Russian prince
- 1252 – Giovanni da Pian del Carpine, Italian archbishop and explorer (born 1180)
- 1299 – Conrad de Lichtenberg, Bishop of Strasbourg (born 1240)
- 1402 – Edmund of Langley, 1st Duke of York, English politician, Lord Warden of the Cinque Ports (born 1341)
- 1457 – Lorenzo Valla, Italian author and educator (born 1406)
- 1464 – Cosimo de' Medici, Italian ruler (born 1386)
- 1494 – Giovanni Santi, artist and father of Raphael (born c. 1435)
- 1541 – Simon Grynaeus, German theologian and scholar (born 1493)
- 1543 – Magnus I, Duke of Saxe-Lauenburg (born 1488)
- 1546 – Peter Faber, French Jesuit theologian (born 1506)
- 1557 – Olaus Magnus, Swedish archbishop, historian, and cartographer (born 1490)
- 1580 – Albrecht Giese, Polish-German politician and diplomat (born 1524) (Note: Date given in Old Style.)
- 1589 – Jacques Clément, French assassin of Henry III of France (born 1567)

=== 1601–1900 ===
- 1603 – Matthew Browne, English politician (born 1563)
- 1714 – Anne, Queen of Great Britain (born 1665)
- 1787 – Alphonsus Maria de' Liguori, Italian bishop and saint (born 1696)
- 1797 – Emanuel Granberg, Finnish church painter (born 1754)
- 1798 – François-Paul Brueys d'Aigalliers, French admiral (born 1753)
- 1807 – John Walker, English actor, philologist, and lexicographer (born 1732)
- 1808 – Lady Diana Beauclerk, English painter and illustrator (born 1734)
- 1812 – Yakov Kulnev, Russian general (born 1763)
- 1851 – William Joseph Behr, German publicist and academic (born 1775)
- 1863 – Jind Kaur Majarani (Regent) of the Sikh Empire (born 1817)
- 1866 – John Ross, American tribal chief (born 1790)
- 1868 – Peter Julian Eymard, French priest, saint, and founder of the Congregation of the Blessed Sacrament (born 1811)
- 1869 – Richard Dry, Australian politician, 7th Premier of Tasmania (born 1815)

=== 1901–present ===
- 1903 – Calamity Jane, American frontierswoman and scout (born 1853)
- 1905 – Henrik Sjöberg, Swedish gymnast and medical student (born 1875)
- 1911 – Edwin Austin Abbey, American painter and illustrator (born 1852)
- 1911 – Samuel Arza Davenport, American lawyer and politician (born 1843)
- 1918 – John Riley Banister, American cowboy and police officer (born 1854)
- 1920 – Bal Gangadhar Tilak, Indian freedom fighter, lawyer and journalist (born 1856)
- 1921 – T. J. Ryan, Australian politician, 19th Premier of Queensland (born 1876)
- 1922 – Donát Bánki, Hungarian engineer (born 1856)
- 1929 – Syd Gregory, Australian cricketer (born 1870)
- 1938 – Edmund C. Tarbell, American painter and academic (born 1862)
- 1943 – Lydia Litvyak, Soviet lieutenant and pilot (born 1921)
- 1944 – Manuel L. Quezon, Filipino soldier, lawyer, and politician, 2nd President of the Philippines (born 1878)
- 1957 – Rose Fyleman, English writer and poet (born 1877)
- 1959 – Jean Behra, French race car driver (born 1921)
- 1963 – Theodore Roethke, American poet (born 1908)
- 1966 – Charles Whitman, American mass murderer (born 1941)
- 1967 – Richard Kuhn, Austrian-German biochemist and academic, Nobel Prize Laureate (born 1900)
- 1970 – Frances Farmer, American actress (born 1913)
- 1970 – Doris Fleeson, American journalist (born 1901)
- 1970 – Otto Heinrich Warburg, German physician and physiologist, Nobel Prize laureate (born 1883)
- 1973 – Gian Francesco Malipiero, Italian composer and educator (born 1882)
- 1973 – Walter Ulbricht, German soldier and politician (born 1893)
- 1974 – Ildebrando Antoniutti, Italian cardinal (born 1898)
- 1977 – Francis Gary Powers, American captain and pilot (born 1929)
- 1980 – Patrick Depailler, French race car driver (born 1944)
- 1980 – Strother Martin, American actor (born 1919)
- 1981 – Paddy Chayefsky, American author, playwright, and screenwriter (born 1923)
- 1981 – Kevin Lynch, Irish Republican, died on hunger strike
- 1982 – T. Thirunavukarasu, Sri Lankan lawyer and politician (born 1933)
- 1989 – John Ogdon, English pianist and composer (born 1937)
- 1990 – Norbert Elias, German-Dutch sociologist, author, and academic (born 1897)
- 1996 – Tadeusz Reichstein, Polish-Swiss chemist and academic, Nobel Prize laureate (born 1897)
- 1996 – Lucille Teasdale-Corti, Canadian physician and surgeon (born 1929)
- 1998 – Eva Bartok, Hungarian-British actress (born 1927)
- 2001 – Korey Stringer, American football player (born 1974)
- 2003 – Guy Thys, Belgian footballer, coach, and manager (born 1922)
- 2003 – Marie Trintignant, French actress and screenwriter (born 1962)
- 2004 – Philip Abelson, American physicist, editor, and author (born 1913)
- 2005 – Al Aronowitz, American journalist (born 1928)
- 2005 – Wim Boost, Dutch cartoonist and educator (born 1918)
- 2005 – Constant Nieuwenhuys, Dutch painter and sculptor (born 1920)
- 2005 – Fahd of Saudi Arabia (born 1923)
- 2006 – Bob Thaves, American illustrator (born 1924)
- 2006 – Iris Marion Young, American political scientist and activist (born 1949)
- 2007 – Tommy Makem, Irish singer-songwriter and banjo player (born 1932)
- 2008 – Gertan Klauber, Czech-born English actor (born 1932)
- 2008 – Harkishan Singh Surjeet, Indian lawyer and politician (born 1916)
- 2009 – Corazon Aquino, Filipino politician, 11th President of the Philippines (born 1933)
- 2010 – Lolita Lebrón, Puerto Rican-American activist (born 1919)
- 2010 – Eric Tindill, New Zealand rugby player and cricketer (born 1910)
- 2012 – Aldo Maldera, Italian footballer and agent (born 1953)
- 2012 – Douglas Townsend, American composer and musicologist (born 1921)
- 2012 – Barry Trapnell, English cricketer and academic (born 1924)
- 2013 – John Amis, English journalist and critic (born 1922)
- 2013 – Gail Kobe, American actress and producer (born 1932)
- 2013 – Babe Martin, American baseball player (born 1920)
- 2013 – Toby Saks, American cellist and educator (born 1942)
- 2013 – Wilford White, American football player (born 1928)
- 2014 – Valyantsin Byalkevich, Belarusian footballer and manager (born 1973)
- 2014 – Jan Roar Leikvoll, Norwegian author (born 1974)
- 2014 – Charles T. Payne, American soldier (born 1925)
- 2014 – Mike Smith, English radio and television host (born 1955)
- 2015 – Stephan Beckenbauer, German footballer and manager (born 1968)
- 2015 – Cilla Black, English singer and actress (born 1943)
- 2015 – Bernard d'Espagnat, French physicist, philosopher, and author (born 1921)
- 2015 – Bob Frankford, English-Canadian physician and politician (born 1939)
- 2015 – Hong Yuanshuo, Chinese footballer and manager (born 1948)
- 2016 – Queen Anne of Romania (born 1923)
- 2020 – Wilford Brimley, American actor and singer (born 1934)
- 2020 – Rickey Dixon, American professional football player (born 1966)
- 2020 – Rodney H. Pardey, American poker player (born 1945)
- 2021 – Abdalqadir as-Sufi, Scottish Islamic scholar and writer (born 1930)
- 2021 – Jerry Ziesmer, American assistant director, production manager and occasional actor (born 1939)
- 2024 – Joyce Brabner, American writer and artist (born 1952)

== Holidays and observances ==
- Armed Forces Day (Lebanon)
- Armed Forces Day (China) or Anniversary of the Founding of the People's Liberation Army (People's Republic of China)
- Azerbaijani Language and Alphabet Day (Azerbaijan)
- Emancipation Day is commemorated in many parts of the former British Empire, which marks the day the Slavery Abolition Act 1833 came into effect which abolished chattel slavery in the British Empire:
  - Emancipation Day is a public holiday in Barbados, Bermuda, Guyana, Jamaica, Saint Vincent and the Grenadines, Trinidad and Tobago
- Christian feast day:
  - Abgar V of Edessa (Syrian Church)
  - Alphonsus Maria de' Liguori
  - Æthelwold of Winchester
  - Bernard Võ Văn Duệ (one of Vietnamese Martyrs)
  - Blessed Gerhard Hirschfelder
  - Eusebius of Vercelli
  - Exuperius of Bayeux
  - Felix of Girona
  - Peter Apostle in Chains
  - Blessed Mary Stella and her Ten Companions
  - Procession of the Cross and the beginning of Dormition Fast (Eastern Orthodoxy)
  - The Holy Maccabees
  - August 1 (Eastern Orthodox liturgics)
- Minden Day (United Kingdom)
- National Day, celebrates the independence of Benin from France in 1960.
- Official Birthday and Coronation Day of the King of Tonga (Tonga)
- Parents' Day (Democratic Republic of the Congo)
- Statehood Day (Colorado)
- Swiss National Day, commemorates Switzerland becoming a single unit in 1291.
- The beginning of autumn observances in the Northern hemisphere and spring observances in the Southern hemisphere (Neopagan Wheel of the Year):
  - Lughnasadh in the Northern hemisphere, Imbolc in the Southern hemisphere; traditionally begins on the eve of August 1. (Gaels, Ireland, Scotland, Neopagans)
  - Lammas (England, Scotland, Neopagans)
  - Pachamama Raymi (Quechuan in Ecuador and Peru)
- Victory Day (Cambodia, Laos, Vietnam)
- World Scout Scarf Day
- Yorkshire Day (Yorkshire, England)

== International Border Change ==
Every year on August 1, Pheasant Island is transferred from Spain to France.
