= Rosmuc =

Village in County Galway, Ireland

Rosmuc Ros Muc
- Village
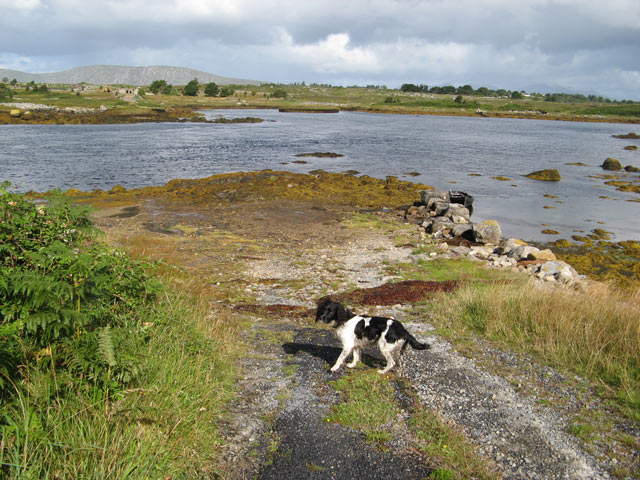
- Camus Bay

- Location in Ireland
- Coordinates: 53°21′01″N 9°36′57″W
- Country: Ireland
- Province: Connacht
- County: County Galway
- Elevation: 1 m (3.3 ft)
- Time zone: UTC+0 (WET)
  - Summer (DST): UTC-1 (IST (WEST))
- Irish Grid Reference: L924345

Rosmuc or Ros Muc, sometimes anglicised as Rosmuck, is a village in the Conamara Gaeltacht of County Galway, Ireland. It lies halfway between the town of Clifden and the city of Galway. Irish is the predominant spoken language in the area, with the electoral division of Turlough, Rosmuc, representing one of the highest percentages of Irish-speaking people in the country. The townland of Rosmuck is part of the civil parish of Kilcummin.

== History and etymology ==
It is estimated that people first settled in Rosmuc in AD 400, one hundred years before Naomh Briocán (Saint Briocán) brought Christianity to the area.

It is believed that the name 'Ros Muc' comes from the old Irish "the peninsula of rounded hills", ros meaning "promontory or headland" and muc meaning "rounded hills" or "pig". This may derive from a perception that the rounded hills on the horizon and surrounding the district look like the rounded backs of farm animals.

== Population ==
As of the 2011 census, Rosmuc townland had a population of 72 people.

== Irish language ==
As of 2006, there were 557 people living in the Ros Muc Electoral Division, and 87% of these were native Irish speakers. According to an analysis of the census a total of 91.9% of adults over nineteen years old said they spoke Irish on a daily basis.

== Literature ==
The area has been home to a number of literary figures, including Irish revolutionary and language activist Patrick Pearse (Pádraig Mac Piarais) who had a summer residence there in the early 1900s and set several of his short stories in the area. Pearse was based in his Rosmuc cottage when he wrote the graveside oration, "Ireland unfree shall never be at peace", given at the funeral of Jeremiah O'Donovan Rossa in 1915.

Another local writer was Pádraic Ó Conaire, who wrote 26 books, 473 stories, 237 essays and 6 plays partly set in the region. These included M'Asal Beag Dubh (My Little Black Donkey) and the novella Deoraíocht (Exile).

The Irish language memoirs of Colm Ó Gaora, the former IRA company commander in Rosmuc during the Irish War of Independence, were published in 2008 under the title Mise. An English translation, under the title On the Run: The Story of an Irish Freedom Fighter, was published by Mercier Press in 2011.

== Education ==
Rosmuc has had a long-term association with Coláiste na bhFiann, which provides host accommodation for students learning Irish during the summer months.

The local national (primary) school is named for Saint Briocán. As of 2020, this gaelscoil had an enrollment of 37 pupils.

== Built heritage ==
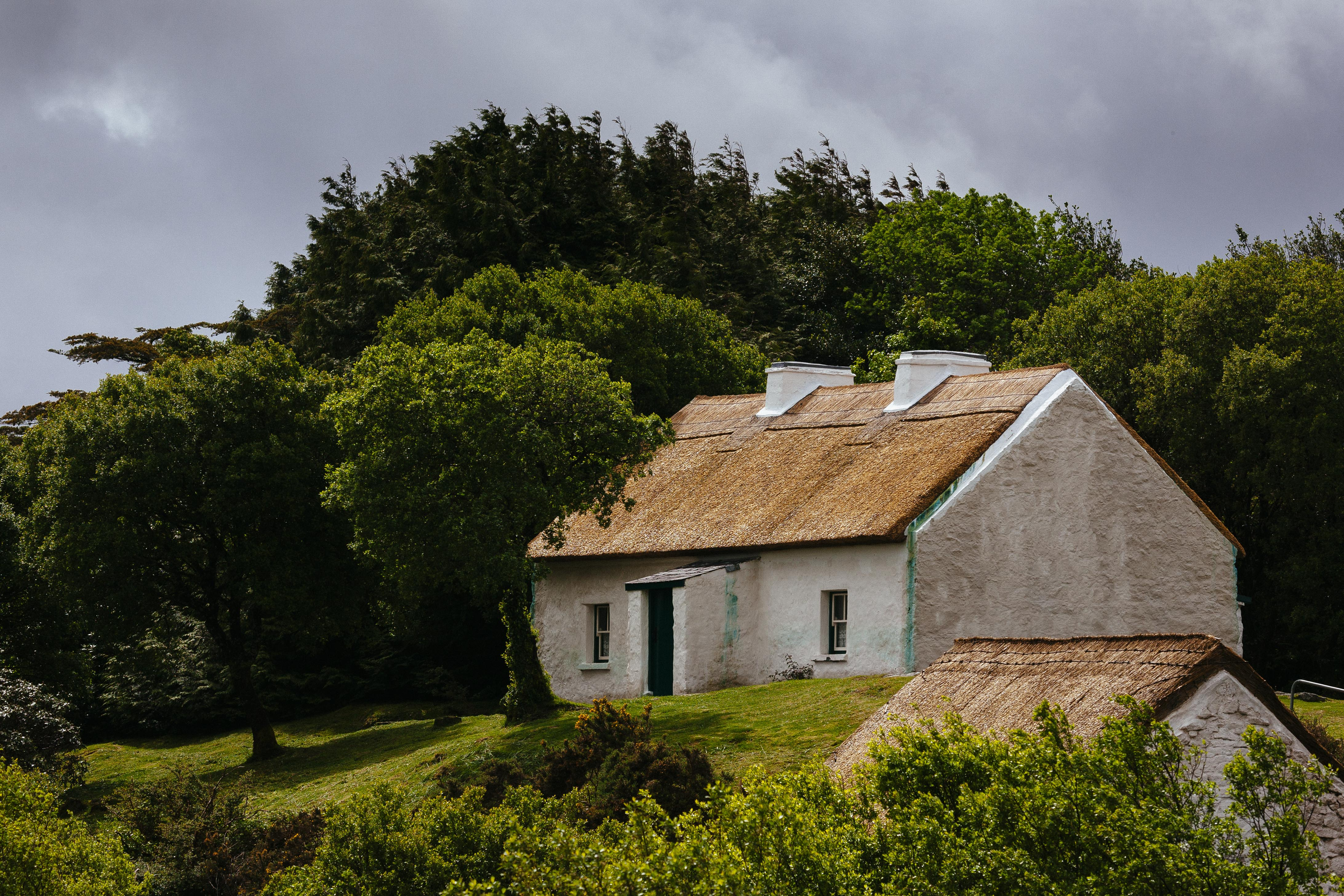
Pearse's Cottage

Among the local landmarks is Pearse's Cottage which was built by Patrick Pearse (Irish: Pádraig Mac Piarais) in 1909. Pearse first came to the area in April 1903 as an examiner for Conradh na Gaeilge. Rosmuc and its people made an impression on him, and he decided to build a holiday home on a site overlooking Loch Eiliúrach. Pearse's Cottage later became a summer school for students from Pearse's school in Dublin, St. Enda's. The cottage is now open to the public as a heritage site and is a designated national monument.

The local Catholic church, Séipéal an Ioncolnaithe, was built in 1844.

== Sport and culture ==
Rosmuc, along with its neighbours Camus and An Sraith Salach, is represented by the Na Piarsaigh Gaelic Athletic Association (GAA) club. This club fields Gaelic football teams in several competitions. The youth team up to minors are called Carna Caiseal/Na Piarsaigh.

Until 2016, a soccer team, Cumann Sacar Naomh Briocain represented the area in the Galway district league.

A traditional Sean-nós dancing festival has historically been held in late January or early February, close to St. Brigid's Day (1 February). This festival, Féile Chóilín Sheáin Dharach, was established in 2001.

== Townlands ==
Townlands in Rosmuc include: Gleann Chatha, An Gort Mór, Inbhear, Turlach, Ros Dubh, An Tamhnaigh Bhig, Snámh Bó, Cill Bhriocáin, An Aill Bhuí, An tOileán Mór, An Turlach Beag, Salalaoi, An Baile Thair, An Siléar, Inis Eilte, An Cladhnach, Cladach ó Dheas, Gairfean, Ros Cíde, Doire Iorrais.

== Notable people ==
Notable residents have included:

- Linda Bhreathnach, actress and director, was born and raised in Rosmuc
- Proinsias Mac Aonghusa, broadcaster, writer, journalist and former president of Conradh na Gaeilge
- Sean (John) Mannion, light-middleweight boxer and later a boxing trainer active in the area.
- Caitlín Maude, poet, playwright and Irish language activist was raised in Cill Bhriocáin in Rosmuc
- Patrick Nee, an Irish-American mobster and author from South Boston, Massachusetts, is a native of Rosmuc
- Patrick Pearse (Pádraig Mac Piarais), Irish language activist and revolutionary
- Mary Walsh, the mother of Marty Walsh, the Mayor of Boston, is a native of Ros Cíde, a townland near Ros Muc

== See also ==
- List of towns and villages in Ireland
