= Patrick Pearse =

Irish revolutionary (1879–1916)

- Pádraig Mac Piarais
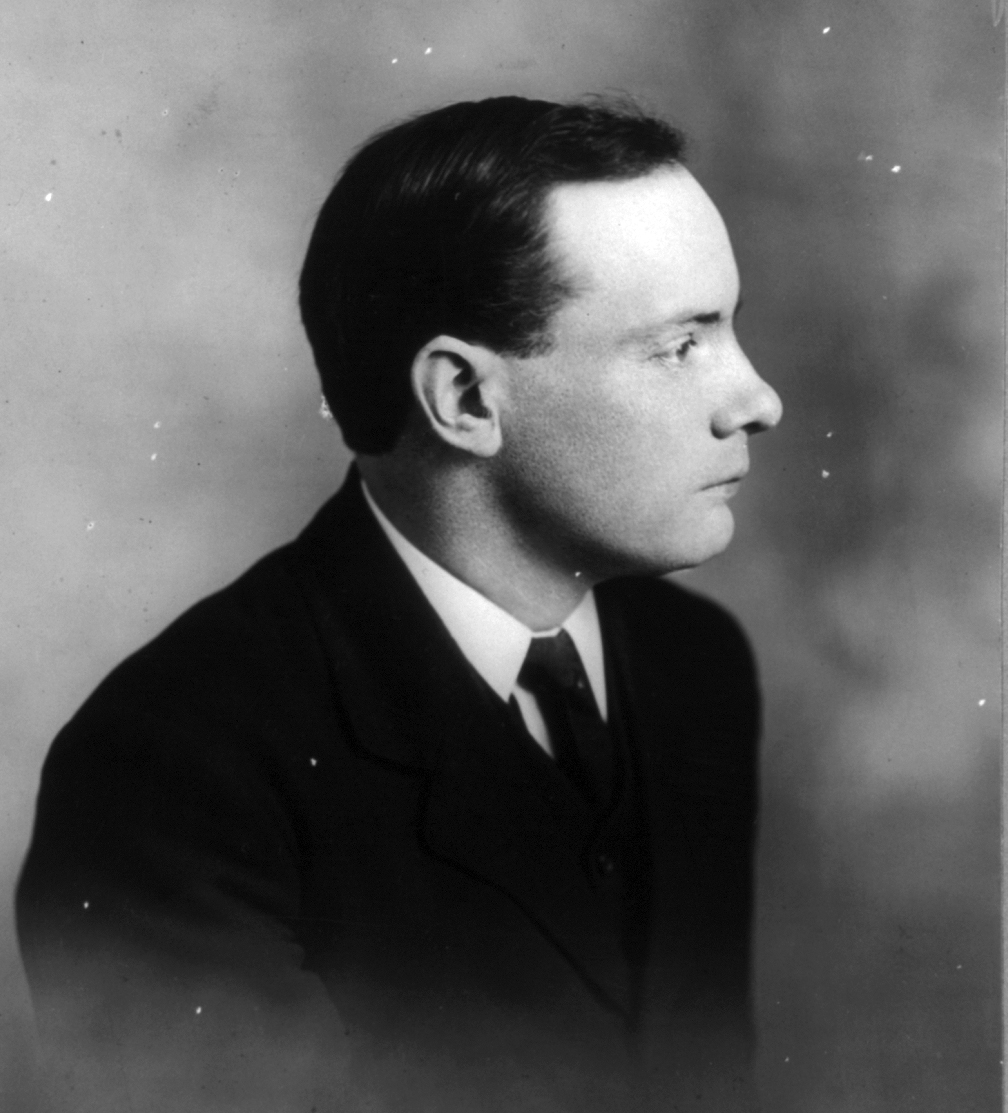
- Pearse in 1916
- Born: 10 November 1879; Dublin, Ireland
- Died: 3 May 1916 (aged 36); Kilmainham Gaol, Dublin, Ireland
- Cause of death: Execution by firing squad
- Resting place: Arbour Hill Prison
- Other name: Pádraig Pearse
- Education: University College Dublin; King's Inns
- Occupations: Educator; principal; barrister; republican activist; poet
- Mother: Margaret Brady
- Military career
- Allegiance: Irish Republic
- Service: Irish Volunteers
- Service years: 1913–1916
- Rank: Commandant
- Commands: Director of Organisation, Irish Volunteers; Commander-in-chief, Army of the Irish Republic
- Conflicts: Easter Rising
- Memorials: Pearse Street; Dublin Pearse railway station

Signature
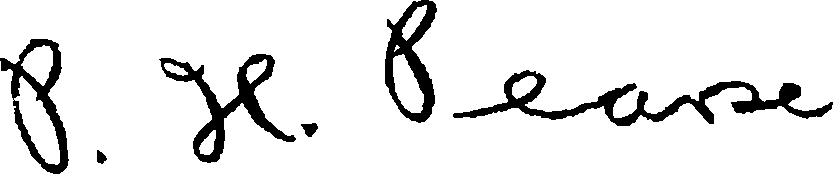

Patrick Henry Pearse (also known as Pádraig or Pádraic Pearse; Irish: Pádraig Anraí Mac Piarais; 10 November 1879 – 3 May 1916) was an Irish teacher, barrister, poet, writer, nationalist, republican political activist and revolutionary who was one of the leaders of the Easter Rising in 1916. Following his execution along with 15 others, Pearse came to be seen by many as the embodiment of the rebellion.

== Early life and influences ==
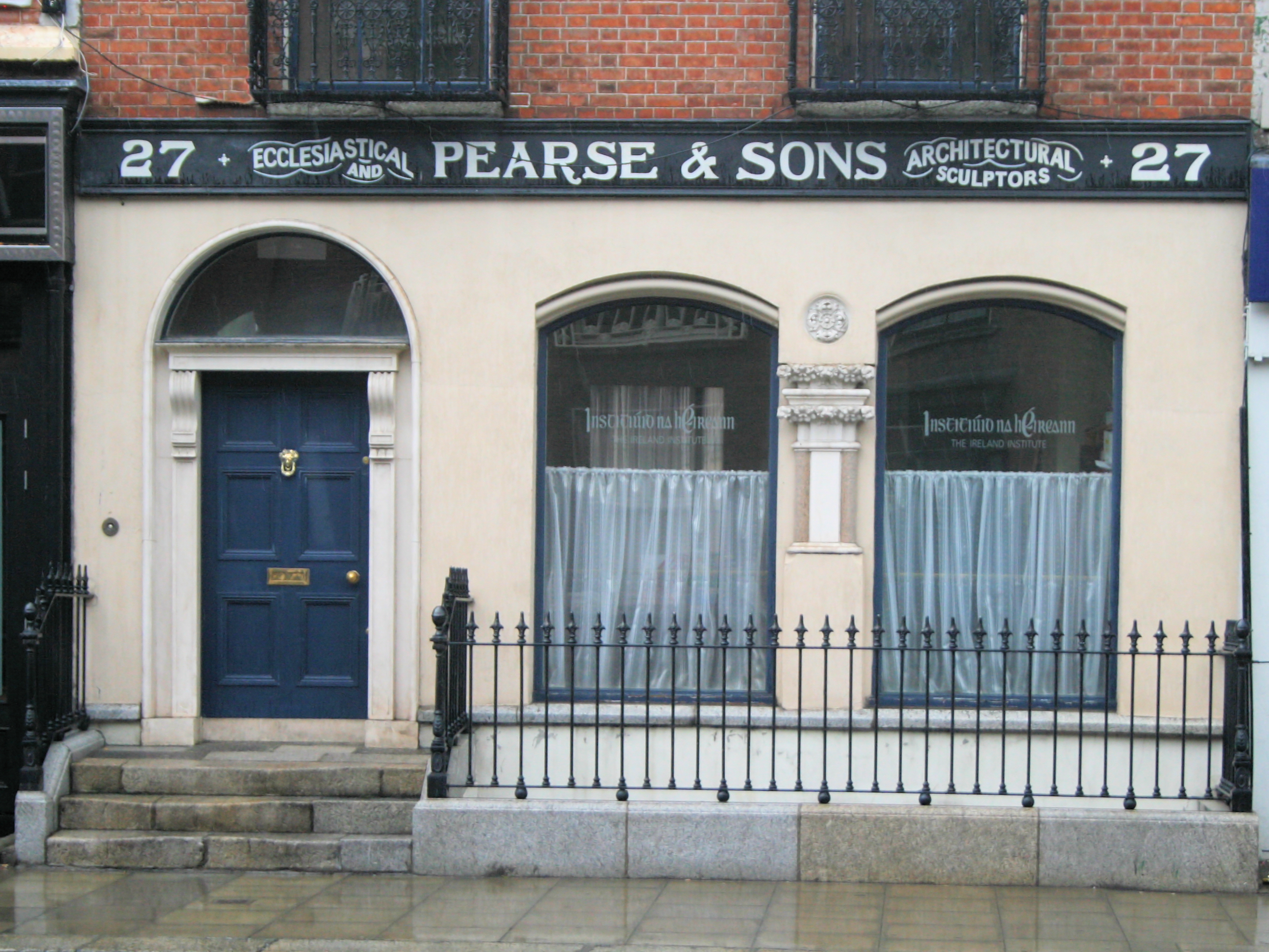
27 Pearse Street, birthplace of Patrick and Willie Pearse

Pearse, his brother Willie, and his sisters Margaret and Mary Brigid were born at 27 Great Brunswick Street, Dublin, the street that is named after them today. It was here that their father, James Pearse, established a stonemasonry business in the 1850s, a business which flourished and provided the Pearses with a comfortable middle-class upbringing. Pearse's father was a mason and monumental sculptor, and originally a Unitarian from Birmingham in England. His mother, Margaret Brady, was from Dublin, and her father's family were native Irish speakers from County Meath. She was James' second wife; James had two children, Emily and James, from his first marriage (two other children died in infancy). Pearse's maternal grandfather Patrick was a supporter of the 1848 Young Ireland movement, and later a member of the Irish Republican Brotherhood (IRB). Pearse recalled a visiting ballad singer performing republican songs during his childhood; afterwards, he went around looking for armed men ready to fight, but finding none, declared sadly to his grandfather that "the Fenians are all dead". His maternal grand-uncle, James Savage, fought in the American Civil War. The Irish-speaking influence of Pearse's grand-aunt Margaret, together with his schooling at the CBS Westland Row, instilled in him an early love for the Irish language and culture.

Pearse grew up surrounded by books. His father had had very little formal education, but was self-educated; Pearse recalled that at the age of ten he prayed to God, promising to dedicate his life to Irish independence. Pearse's early heroes were ancient Gaelic folk heroes such as Cúchulainn, though in his 30s he began to take a strong interest in the leaders of past republican movements, such as the United Irishmen Theobald Wolfe Tone and Robert Emmet.

Pearse soon became involved in the Gaelic revival. In 1896, at the age of 16, he joined the Gaelic League (Conradh na Gaeilge), and in 1903, at the age of 23, he became editor of its newspaper An Claidheamh Soluis ("The Sword of Light").

In 1900, Pearse was awarded a B.A. in Modern Languages (Irish, English and French) by the Royal University of Ireland, for which he had studied for two years privately and for one at University College Dublin. In the same year, he was enrolled as a Barrister-at-Law at the King's Inns. Pearse was called to the bar in 1901. In 1905, Pearse represented Neil McBride, a poet and songwriter from Feymore, Creeslough, County Donegal, who had been fined for having his name displayed in "illegible" writing (i.e. Irish) on his donkey cart. The appeal was heard before the Court of King's Bench in Dublin. It was Pearse's first and only court appearance as a barrister. The case was lost but it became a symbol of the struggle for Irish independence. In his 27 June 1905 An Claidheamh Soluis column, Pearse wrote of the decision, "it was in effect decided that Irish is a foreign language on the same level with Yiddish."

== St Enda's ==
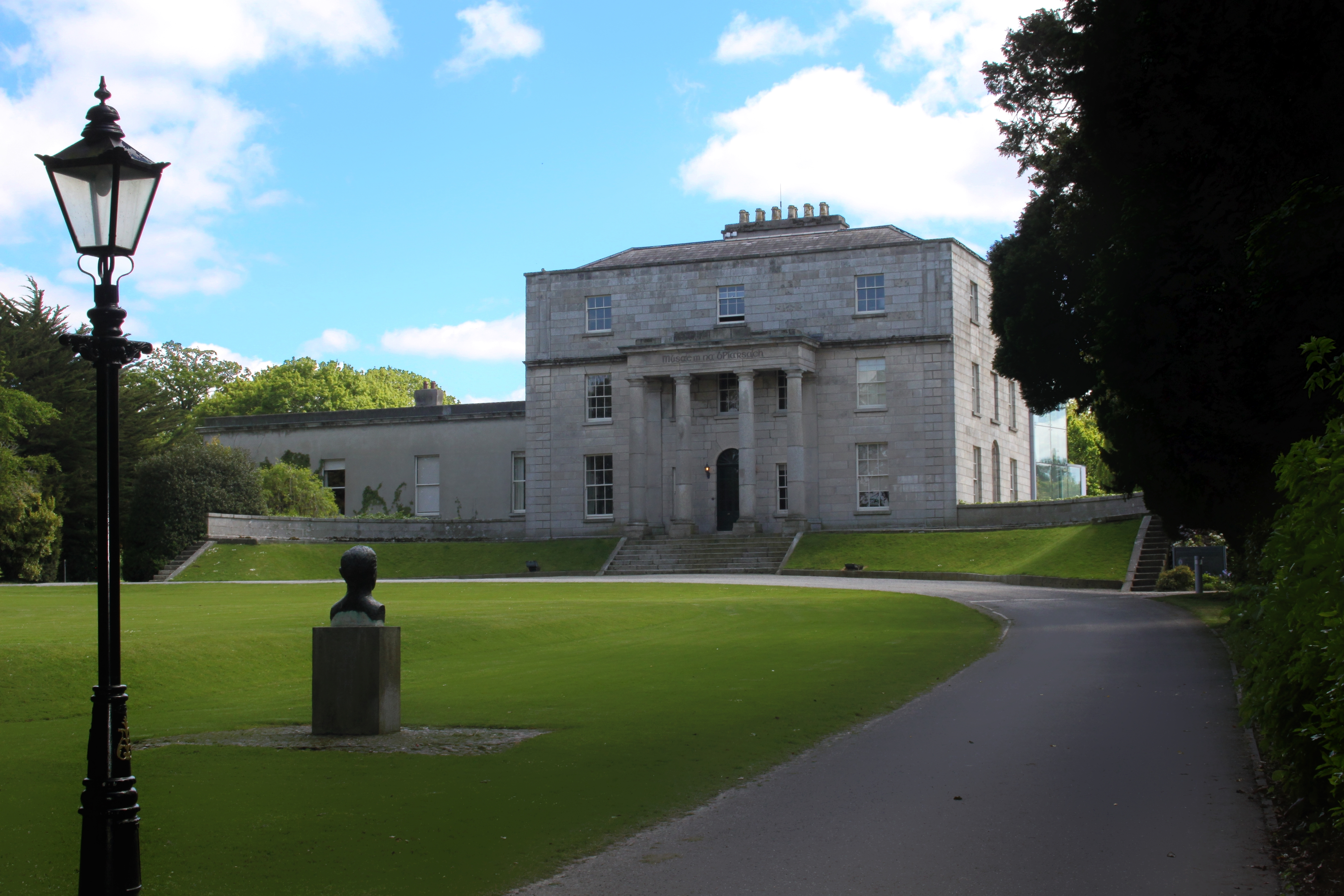
St. Enda's, now the Pearse Museum

As a cultural nationalist educated by the Irish Christian Brothers, like his younger brother Willie, Pearse believed that language was intrinsic to the identity of a nation. The Irish school system, he believed, raised Ireland's youth to be good Englishmen or obedient Irishmen and an alternative was needed. Thus for him and other language revivalists saving the Irish language from extinction was a cultural priority of the utmost importance. The key to saving the language, he felt, would be a sympathetic education system. To show the way he started his own bilingual school for boys, St. Enda's School (Scoil Éanna) in Cullenswood House in Ranelagh, a suburb of County Dublin, in 1908.

Pearse's restless idealism led him in search of an even more idyllic home for his school. He found it in The Hermitage in Rathfarnham, County Dublin, now home to the Pearse Museum. In 1910 Pearse wrote that the Hermitage was an "ideal" location due to the aesthetics of the grounds and that if he could secure it, "the school would be on a level with" the more established schools of the day such as "Clongowes Wood College and Castleknock College". Pearse was also involved in the foundation of Scoil Íde (St Ita's School) for girls, an institution with aims similar to those of St Enda's.

== The Volunteers and Home Rule ==
In April 1912 John Redmond leader of the Irish Parliamentary Party, which held the balance of power in the House of Commons committed the government of the United Kingdom to introduce an Irish Home Rule Bill. Pearse gave the bill a qualified welcome. He was one of four speakers, including Redmond, Joseph Devlin MP, leader of the Northern Nationalists, and Eoin MacNeill a prominent Gaelic Leaguer, who addressed a large Home Rule Rally in Dublin at the end of March 1912. Speaking in Irish, Pearse said he thought that "a good measure can be gained if we have enough courage", but he warned, "Let the English understand that if we are again betrayed, there shall be red war throughout Ireland".

In November 1913 Pearse was invited to the inaugural meeting of the Irish Volunteers—formed in reaction to the creation of the Ulster Volunteers—whose aim was "to secure and maintain the rights and liberties common to the whole people of Ireland". In an article entitled "The Coming Revolution" (November 1913) Pearse wrote:

As to what your work as an Irish Nationalist is to be, I cannot conjecture; I know what mine is to be, and would have you know yours and buckle yourselves to it. And it may be (nay, it is) that your and mine will lead us to a common meeting-place, and that on a certain day we shall stand together, with many more beside us, ready for a greater adventure than any of us has yet had, a trial and a triumph to be endured and achieved in common.

The Home Rule Bill just failed to pass the House of Lords, but the Lords' diminished power under the Parliament Act 1911 meant that the Bill could only be delayed, not stopped. It was placed on the statute books with Royal Assent in September 1914, but its implementation was suspended for the duration of the First World War.

John Redmond feared that his "national authority" might be circumvented by the Volunteers and decided to try to take control of the new movement. Despite opposition from the Irish Republican Brotherhood, the Volunteer Executive agreed to share leadership with Redmond and a joint committee was set up. Pearse was opposed to this and was to write:

The leaders in Ireland have nearly always left the people at the critical moment; they have sometimes sold them. The former Volunteer movement was abandoned by its leaders; O'Connell recoiled before the cannon at Clontarf; twice the hour of the Irish revolution struck during Young Ireland days and twice it struck in vain, for Meagher hesitated in Waterford, Duffy and McGee hesitated in Dublin. Stephens refused to give the word in '65; he never came in '66 or '67. I do not blame these men; you or I might have done the same. It is a terrible responsibility to be cast on a man, that of bidding the cannon speak and the grapeshot pour.

The Volunteers split, one of the issues being support for the Allied and the British war effort. A majority followed Redmond into the National Volunteers in the belief that this would ensure Home Rule on their return. Pearse, exhilarated by the dramatic events of the European war, wrote in an article in December 1915:

It is patriotism that stirs the people. Belgium defending her soil is heroic, and so is Turkey . . . . . .
It is good for the world that such things should be done. The old heart of the earth needed to be warmed with the red wine of the battlefields.
Such august homage was never before offered to God as this, the homage of millions of lives given gladly for love of country.
War is a terrible thing, and this is the most terrible of wars. But this war is not more terrible than the evils which it will end or help to end.

== Irish Republican Brotherhood ==
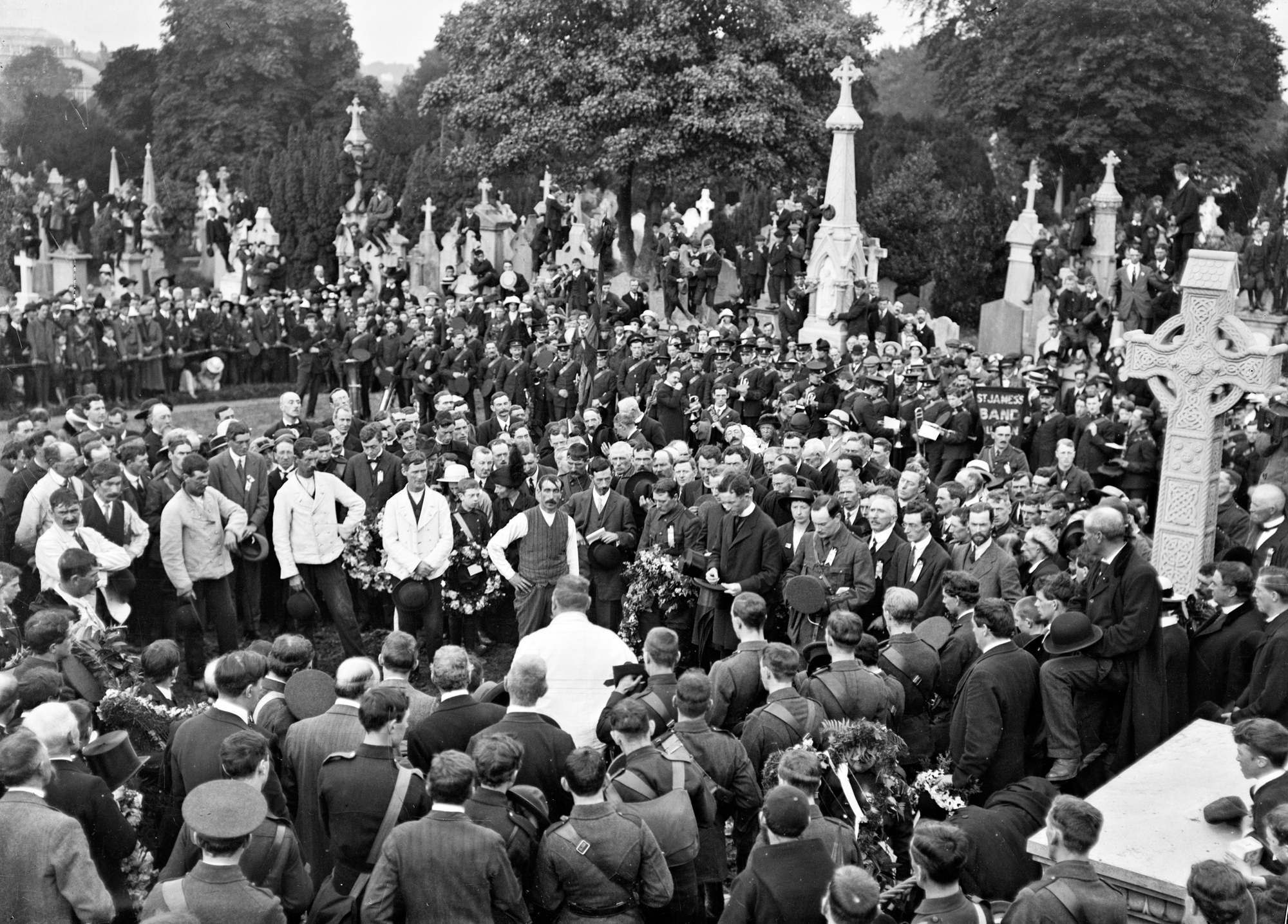
Pearse (in uniform centre-right) at the funeral of O'Donovan Rossa at which he gave a graveside oration.

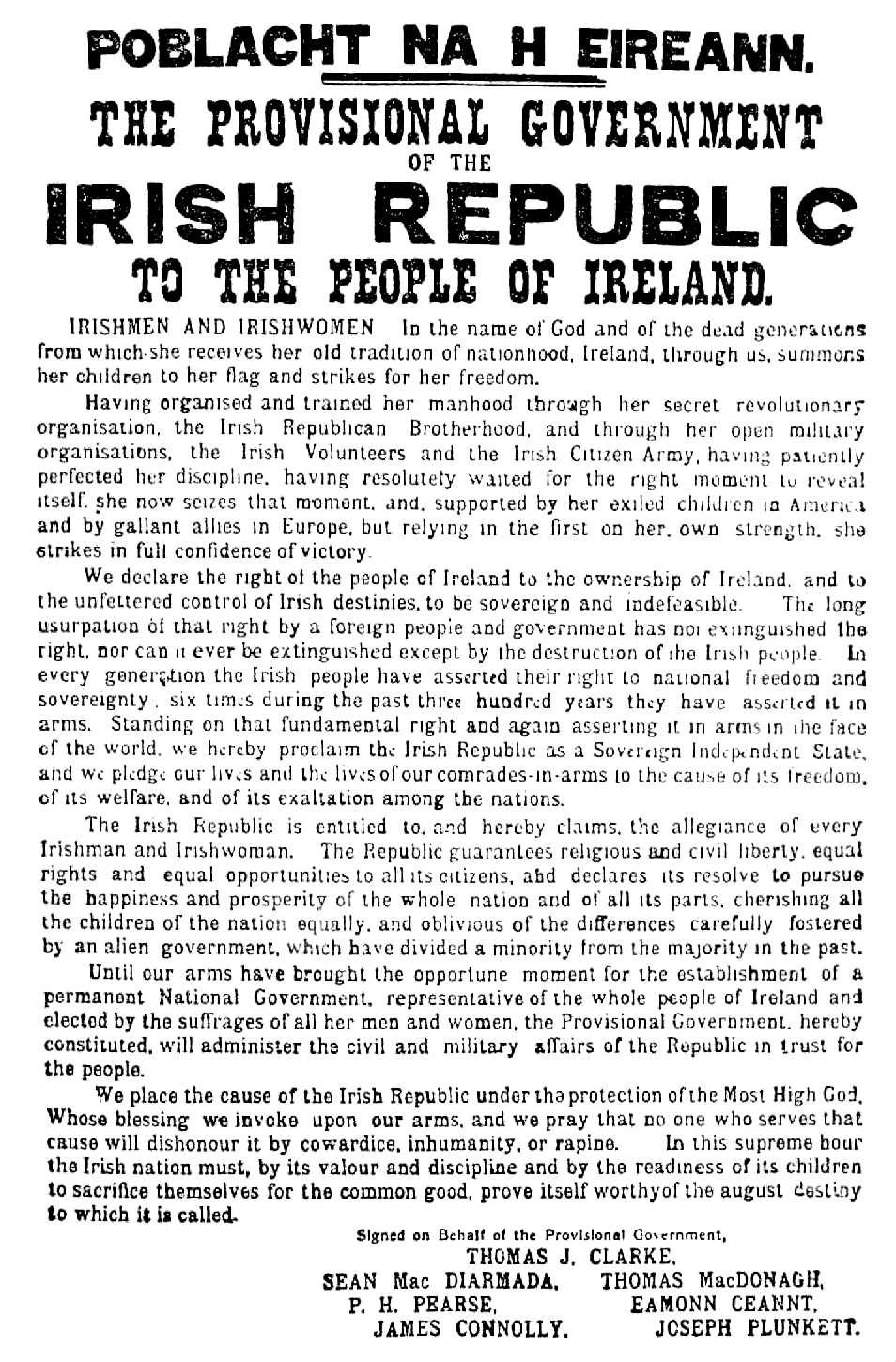
Proclamation of the Irish Republic, read by Pearse outside the GPO at the start of the Easter Rising

In December 1913 Bulmer Hobson swore Pearse into the secret Irish Republican Brotherhood (IRB), an organisation dedicated to the overthrow of British rule in Ireland and its replacement with an Irish Republic. He was soon co-opted onto the IRB's Supreme Council by Tom Clarke. Pearse was then one of many people who were members of both the IRB and the Volunteers. When he became the Volunteers' Director of Military Organisation in 1914 he was the highest ranking Volunteer in the IRB membership, and instrumental in the latter's commandeering of the remaining minority of the Volunteers for the purpose of rebellion. By 1915 he was on the IRB's Supreme Council, and its secret Military Council, the core group that began planning for a rising while war raged on the European Western Front.

On 1 August 1915 Pearse gave a graveside oration at the funeral of the Fenian Jeremiah O'Donovan Rossa. He was the first republican to be filmed giving an oration. It closed with the words:

Our foes are strong and wise and wary; but, strong and wise and wary as they are, they cannot undo the miracles of God who ripens in the hearts of young men the seeds sown by the young men of a former generation. And the seeds sown by the young men of '65 and '67 are coming to their miraculous ripening today. Rulers and Defenders of the Realm had need to be wary if they would guard against such processes. Life springs from death; and from the graves of patriot men and women spring living nations. The Defenders of this Realm have worked well in secret and in the open. They think that they have pacified Ireland. They think that they have purchased half of us and intimidated the other half. They think that they have foreseen everything, think that they have provided against everything; but, the fools, the fools, the fools! – They have left us our Fenian dead, and while Ireland holds these graves, Ireland unfree shall never be at peace. (Full text of Speech)

== Easter Rising and death ==
It was Pearse who, on behalf of the IRB shortly before Easter in 1916, issued the orders to all Volunteer units throughout the country for three days of manoeuvres beginning on Easter Sunday, which was the signal for a general uprising. When Eoin MacNeill, the Chief of Staff of the Volunteers, learned what was being planned without the promised arms from Germany, he countermanded the orders via newspaper, causing the IRB to issue a last-minute order to go through with the plan the following day, greatly limiting the numbers who turned out for the rising.

When the Easter Rising eventually began on Easter Monday, 24 April 1916, it was Pearse who read the Proclamation of the Irish Republic from outside the General Post Office, the headquarters of the Rising. Pearse was the person most responsible for drafting the Proclamation, and he was chosen as President of the Republic. After six days of fighting, heavy civilian casualties and great destruction of property, Pearse issued the order to surrender.

Pearse and 14 other leaders, including his brother Willie, were court-martialled and executed by firing squad. Thomas Clarke, Thomas MacDonagh and Pearse himself were the first of the rebels to be executed, on the morning of 3 May 1916. Pearse's last words are unknown, but he whistled as he was led to his execution. Pearse was 36 years old at the time of his death. Roger Casement, who had tried unsuccessfully to recruit an insurgent force among Irish-born prisoners of war from the Irish Brigade in Germany, was hanged in London the following August.

Sir John Maxwell, the Commander-in-Chief, Ireland, sent a telegram to H. H. Asquith, then Prime Minister, advising him not to return the bodies of the Pearse brothers to their family, saying, "Irish sentimentality will turn these graves into martyrs' shrines to which annual processions will be made, which would cause constant irritation in this country." Maxwell also suppressed a letter from Pearse to his mother, and two poems dated 1 May 1916. He submitted copies of them also to Prime Minister Asquith, saying that some of the content was "objectionable".

== Writings ==
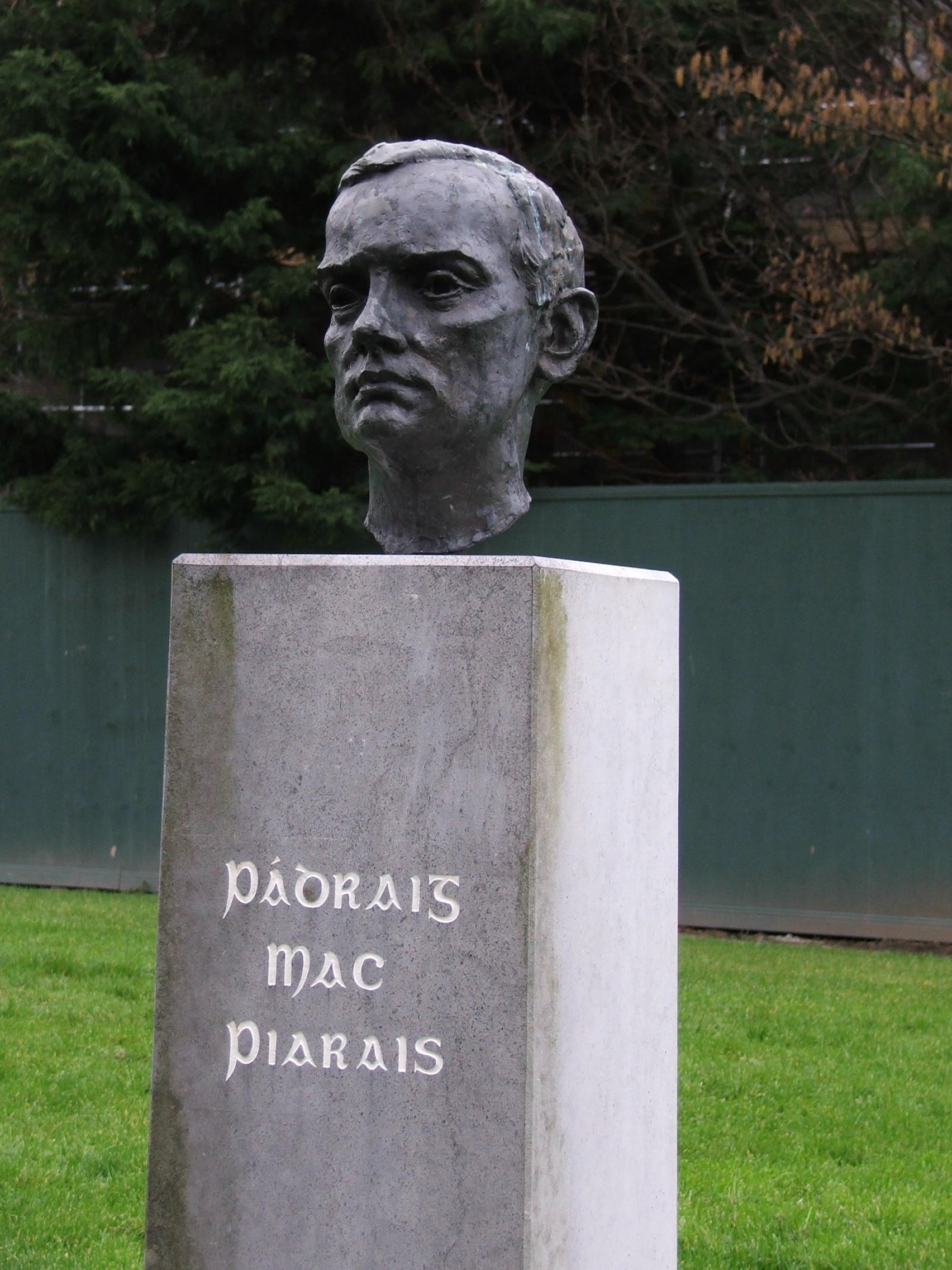
Bust of Pearse in Tralee, County Kerry

Pearse wrote stories and poems in both Irish and English. His best-known English poems include "The Mother", "The Fool", "The Rebel" and "The Wayfarer". He also wrote several allegorical plays in the Irish language, including The King, The Master, and The Singer. His short stories in Irish include Eoghainín na nÉan ("Eoineen of the Birds"), Íosagán ("Little Jesus"), An Gadaí ("The Thief"), Na Bóithre ("The Roads"), and An Bhean Chaointe ("The Keening Woman"). These were translated into English by Joseph Campbell (in the Collected Works of 1917). Most of his ideas on education are contained in his essay "The Murder Machine". He also wrote many essays on politics and language, notably "The Coming Revolution" and "Ghosts".

Pearse is closely associated with his rendering of the Jacobite sean-nós song, "Oró Sé do Bheatha 'Bhaile", for which he composed republican lyrics.

According to Innti poet and literary critic Louis de Paor, despite Pearse's enthusiasm for the Conamara Theas dialect of Connacht Irish spoken around his summer cottage at Rosmuc in Connemara, he chose to follow the usual practice of the Gaelic revival by writing in Munster Irish, which was considered less Anglicized than other Irish dialects.

Also according to de Paor, Pearse's reading of the radically experimental poetry of Walt Whitman and of the French Symbolists led him to introduce Modernist poetry into the Irish language. As a literary critic, Pearse also left behind a very detailed blueprint for the decolonisation of Irish literature, particularly in the Irish language.

De Paor writes that Patrick Pearse was "the most perceptive critic and most accomplished poet", of the early Gaelic revival providing "a sophisticated model for a new literature in Irish that would reestablish a living connection with the pre-colonial Gaelic past while resuming its relationship with contemporary Europe, bypassing the monolithic influence of English." For these reasons, de Paor called Pearse's death a catastrophic loss for modern literature in Irish. According to de Paor, this loss only began to be healed during the 1940s by the modernist poetry of Seán Ó Ríordáin, Máirtín Ó Direáin, and Máire Mhac an tSaoi; and by the modernist novels An Béal Bocht by Flann O'Brien and Cré na Cille by Máirtín Ó Cadhain.

== Reputation ==
With the outbreak of conflict in Northern Ireland in 1969, Pearse's legacy was used by the Provisional IRA.

Pearse's ideas have been seen by Seán Farrell Moran as belonging to the context of European cultural history as a part of a rejection of reason by European social thinkers. Additionally, his place within Catholicism, where his orthodoxy was challenged in the early 1970s, has been addressed to suggest that Pearse's theological foundations for his political ideas share in a long-existing tradition in western Christianity.

Former Fianna Fáil Taoiseach Bertie Ahern described Pearse as one of his heroes and displayed a picture of Pearse over his desk in the Department of the Taoiseach.

Pearse's mother Margaret Pearse served as a TD in Dáil Éireann in the 1920s. His sister Margaret Mary Pearse also served as a TD and Senator.

In a 2006 book, psychiatrists Michael Fitzgerald and Antoinette Walker speculated that Pearse had Asperger syndrome. Pearse's apparent "sexual immaturity", and some of his behaviour, has been the subject of comment since the 1970s by historians such as Ruth Dudley Edwards, T. Ryle Dwyer and Seán Farrell Moran, who speculated that he was attracted to young boys. His most recent biographer, Joost Augusteijn, concluded that "it seems most probable that he was sexually inclined this way". Fitzgerald and Walker maintain that there is absolutely no evidence of homosexuality or paedophilia; they allege that Pearse's apparent lack of sexual interest in women, and his "ascetic" and celibate lifestyle are consistent with a diagnosis of high-functioning autism. Cultural historian Elaine Sisson has further said that Pearse's interest in and idealisation of young boys needs to be seen in the context of the Victorian era "cult of the boy".

In almost all of Pearse's portraits, he struck a sideways pose, concealing his left side. This was to hide a strabismus or squint in his left eye, which he felt was an embarrassing condition.

== Commemoration ==
- The building in Rathfarnham, on the south side of Dublin, that once housed Pearse's school, St Enda's, is now the Pearse Museum.
- Pearse Street and Pearse Square in Dublin were renamed in 1926 in honour of Pearse and his brother Willie, Pearse Street (previously Great Brunswick Street) being their birthplace. Other Pearse Streets can be found in Athlone, Ballina (formerly Knox Street), Bandon, Cahir, Cavan, Clonakilty (formerly Sovereign Street), Gorey, Kilkenny, Kinsale, Mountmellick, Mullingar, Nenagh and Sallynoggin (where there are also Pearse Park, Avenue, Road and other uses of the name).
- There are Pearse Roads in Ardara, County Donegal, Ballyphehane in Cork (which also has Pearse Place and Square), Bray, Cookstown (County Wicklow), Cork, Cranmore (which also has Pearse Crescent and Terrace), Dublin 16, Enniscorthy, Graiguecullen (County Carlow), Letterkenny, Limerick (which also has Pearse Avenue), Sligo and Tralee
- There are Pearse Parks (residential streets) in Drogheda, Dundalk and Tullamore, and (parkland) on the outskirts of Arklow and in Tralee (the former demesne of Tralee Castle). There are other Pearse Avenues in Carrickmacross, Ennis, Mervue in Galway and Mallow. Carrigtwohill has a Patrick Pearse Place and there is a Pearse Bridge in Terenure. There is a Pearse Brothers Park in Rathfarnham and a Pearse Terrace in Westport.
- Longford has Pearse Drive and Pearse View. Crumlin (Dublin) has a Pearse Memorial Park.
- Ballyheigue has a statue built in commemoration.
- Every February, just before the Annual Irish language Dining celebration at King's Inns, the institution hosts an Irish language debate where a Bonn an Phiarsaigh (the Pearse medal) is awarded to the winner.

=== Educational institutions ===
Cullenswood House, the Pearse family home in Ranelagh where Pádraic first founded St Enda's, today houses a primary Gaelscoil (school for education through the Irish language) called Lios na nÓg, part of a community-based effort to revive the Irish language. Crumlin (Dublin) has the Pearse College of Further Education, and there was formerly an Irish language summer school in Gaoth Dobhair called Colaiste an Phiarsaigh. In Rosmuc there is an Irish-medium vocational school, Gairmscoil na bPiarsach. The main lecture hall at the Cadet School in Ireland is named after P.H. Pearse. In September 2014, Gaelcholáiste an Phiarsaigh, a new Irish language medium secondary school, opened its doors for the first time in the former Loreto Abbey buildings, just 1 km from the Pearse Museum in St Endas Park, Rathfarnham. Glanmire, County Cork boasts the best secondary-level Irish-speaking college in Ireland, called Coláiste an Phiarsaigh, which was named in honour of Patrick Pearse and structured around his beliefs.

=== Sports venues and clubs ===
A number of Gaelic Athletic Association clubs and playing fields in Ireland are named after Pádraic or both Pearses:

- Antrim: Pearse Park, Dunloy; Patrick Pearse's GAC, Belfast
- Armagh: Annaghmore Pearses GFC; Pearse Óg GAC and its grounds, Pearse Óg Park, Armagh
- Cork: CLG Na Piarsaigh, Cork
- Derry: Pádraig Pearse's GAC, Kilrea; Pearse's GFC, Waterside, Derry (defunct)
- Donegal: Pearse's Park, Ardara
- Dublin: Ballyboden St. Enda's GAA (called after Pearse's school); Pearse's GAC, Rathfarnham (defunct)
- Galway: CLG Na Piarsaigh, Ros Muc;Pádraig Pearse's GAC, Ballymacward & Gurteen; Pearse Stadium, Salthill
- Kerry: Dromid Pearses GAC; Kilflynn Pearses HC (defunct)
- Limerick: CLG Na Piarsaigh, Limerick
- Longford: Pearse Park, Longford
- Louth: CPG Na Piarsaigh, Dundalk
- Monaghan: Ballybay Pearse Brothers, and its grounds, Pearse Park
- Roscommon: Pádraig Pearse's GAC
- Tyrone: Pearse Óg GAC, Dregish; Fintona Pearses GAC; and Galbally Pearses GAC, and its grounds, Pearse Park; a defunct club, Leckpatrick Pearse Óg GAC
- Wexford: Naomh Eanna GAA (called after Pearse's school); P.H. Pearse's HC, Enniscorthy (defunct)
- Wicklow: Pearses' Park, Arklow

So also are several outside Ireland:

- Australasia: Pádraig Pearse GAC, Victoria
- London: Brother Pearse's GAC, London
- Scotland: Pearse Park, Glasgow; Pearse Harps HC (defunct)
- Yorkshire: Brothers Pearse GAC, Huddersfield
- North America: Pádraig Pearse GFC, Chicago; Pádraig Pearse GFC, Detroit

There are also soccer clubs named Pearse Celtic FC in Cork and in Ringsend, Dublin; and Liffeys Pearse FC, a south Dublin soccer club formed by the amalgamation of Liffey Wanderers and Pearse Rangers. A Pearse Rangers schoolboy football club remains in existence in Dublin.

=== Other commemorations ===
- In 1916 the English composer Arnold Bax, who had met the man, composed a tone poem entitled In Memoriam Patrick Pearse. It received its first public performance in 2008.
- In Belfast the Pearse Club on King Street was wrecked by an explosion in May 1938.
- Westland Row Station in Dublin was renamed Pearse Station in 1966 after the Pearse brothers.
- The silver ten shilling coin minted in 1966 featured the bust of Patrick Pearse. It is the sole Irish coin ever to have featured anyone associated with Irish history or politics.
- In Ballymun the Patrick Pearse Tower was named after him. It was the first of Ballymun's tower blocks to be demolished in 2004.
- In 1999 the centenary of Pearse's induction as a member of the Gorsedd at the 1899 Pan Celtic Eisteddfod in Cardiff (when he took the Bardic name Areithiwr) was marked by the unveiling of a plaque at the Consulate General of Ireland in Wales.
- Postage stamps commemorating Pearse were issued by the Irish postal service in 1966, 1979 and 2008.
- Writer Prvoslav Vujcic is nicknamed Pearse after Patrick Pearse.
- In 2016 Leinster GAA inaugurated a Pearse medal in recognition of Pearse's role as vice president of the province's Colleges' Committee. The medals are awarded to the best footballer and hurler in the Leinster senior championship each year.

== Sources ==
- Joost Augusteijn, Patrick Pearse: The Making of a Revolutionary, 2009.
- Tim Pat Coogan, Michael Collins. Hutchinson, 1990.
- Ruth Dudley Edwards, Patrick Pearse: the Triumph of Failure, London: Gollancz, 1977.
- F. S. L. Lyons, Ireland Since the Famine. London: Collins/Fontana, 1973.
- Dorothy Macardle, The Irish Republic. Corgi, 1968.
- Arthur Mitchell & Pádraig Ó Snodaigh, Irish Political Documents 1916–1949. Dublin: Irish Academic Press, 1985
- Seán Farrell Moran, Patrick Pearse and the Politics of Redemption: The Mind of the Easter Rising 1916, Washington, Catholic University Press, 1994
  - "Patrick Pearse and the European Revolt against Reason", in The Journal of the History of Ideas, 50:4 (1989), 625–43
  - "Patrick Pearse and Patriotic Soteriology: The Irish Republican Tradition and the Sanctification of Political Self-Immolation" in The Irish Terrorism Experience, ed. Yonah Alexander and Alan O'Day, 1991, 9–29
- Brian Murphy, Patrick Pearse and the Lost Republican Ideal, Dublin, James Duffy, 1990.
- Ruán O'Donnell, Patrick Pearse, Dublin: O'Brien Press, 2016
- Mary Pearse, The Home Life of Pádraig Pearse. Cork: Mercier, 1971.
- Patrick Pearse, Short Stories. Trans. Joseph Campbell. Ed. Anne Markey. Dublin: University College Dublin Press, 2009
- Elaine Sisson, "Pearse's Patriots: The Cult of Boyhood at St. Enda's". Cork University Press, 2004, repr. 2005
