= CLG Na Piarsaigh =

Gaelic games club in County Galway, Ireland

Na Piarsaigh
- CLG Na Piarsaigh
- Founded: 1959
- County: Galway
- Nickname: Na Pocaidí
- Colours: Maroon and green
- Grounds: Páirc na bPiarsach
- Coordinates: 53°23′18.1″N 9°37′02.4″W

Playing kits
Standard colours

CLG Na Piarsaigh is a Gaelic Athletic Association club in County Galway. The club takes its name from the Irish revolutionary Pádraic Pearse. Pearse had a cottage in the area which over looks the club grounds. The club's crest includes the cottage and a swallow. The swallow is taken for the short story he wrote set in Ros Muc called Eoghainín na nÉan.

== History ==
The club was formed in 1959, in the old school house of Camus, County Galway. The club colors of maroon and green were chosen to represent county and country, maroon for Galway and green for Ireland. The club's catchment area includes Ros Muc, Camus and Recess.
