= Wim Boost =

Dutch cartoonist (1918–2005)

- Born: Willem Louis Joseph Boost; July 2, 1918 Breda, Netherlands
- Died: August 1, 2005 (aged 87) Breukelen, Netherlands
- Areas: Cartoonist, illustrator

Willem Louis Joseph Boost (2 July 1918, in Breda – 1 August 2005, in Breukelen), was a Dutch cartoonist, using the alias WiBo.

== Career ==
Boost initially trained and worked as a drawing teacher before joining the Toonder Studios during the Second World War. After 1945 he drew for the ANWB youth magazine Jeugdkampioen and for Het Lichtspoor, a weekly for the Dutch armed forces.

From 1951 he was on staff at Volkskrant, producing a daily cartoon that appeared at the lower left of the front page. Over time this became a fixture of the paper’s presentation and public identity. Boost’s final Volkskrant cartoon — the last of a total of 8,888 - ran in June 1983, after which he said farewell in the paper’s weekend supplement later that month.

Alongside his newspaper work he contributed a column to Haagse Post, drew for the satirical monthly Mandril. Maandblad voor Mensen, and made cartoons for Studio, the KRO programme guide, in the 1960s.

== Death ==
Boost died in Breukelen on 1 August 2005 at the age of 87.
