= William Joseph Behr =

German publicist and writer (1775–1851)

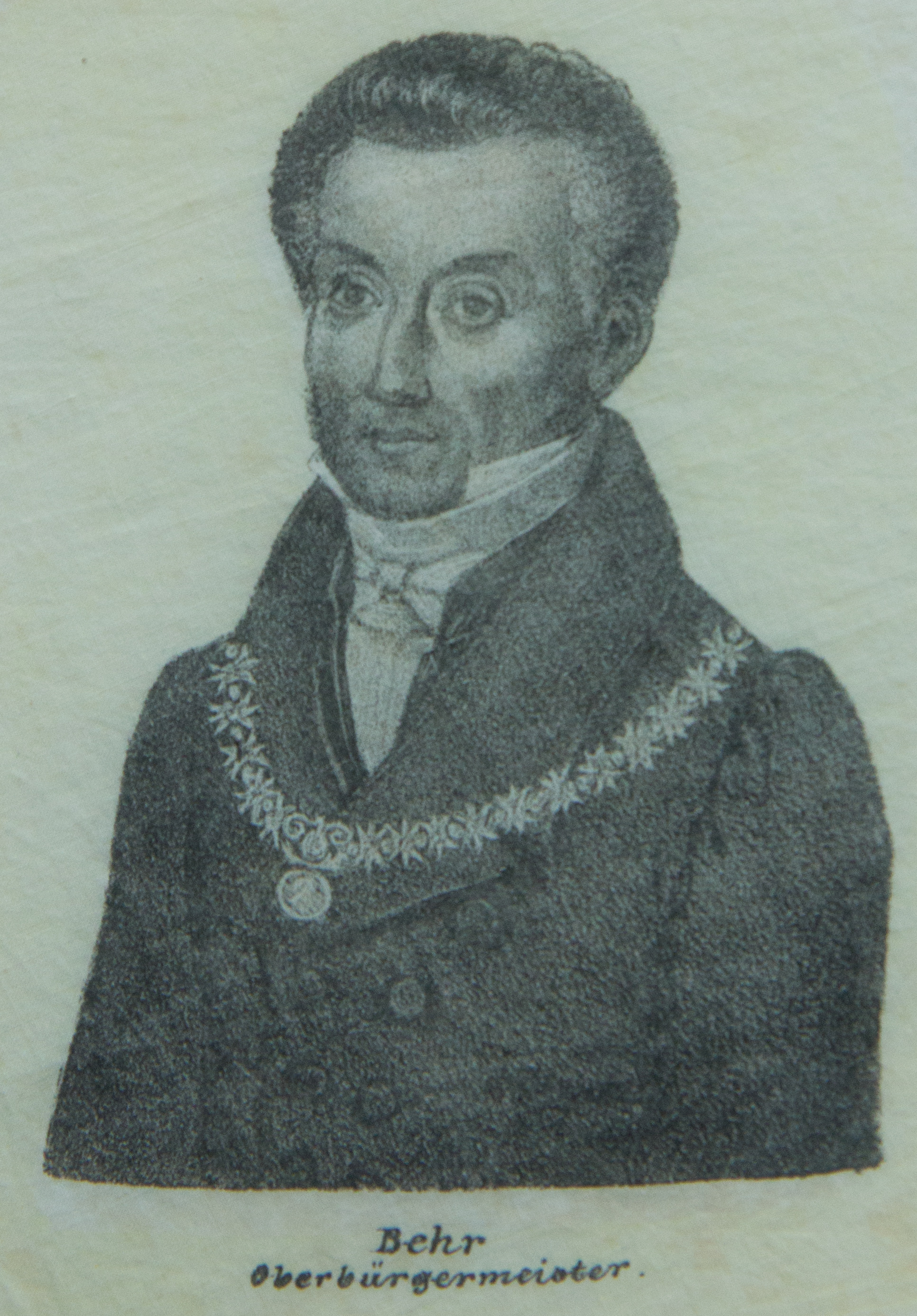
William Joseph Behr

William Joseph Behr (26 August 1775 – 1 August 1851), German publicist and writer.

== Life ==
He was born at Sulzheim.

He studied law at Würzburg and Göttingen, became professor of public law in the university of Würzburg in 1799, and in 1819 was elected as a deputy for the university to the Landtag of Bavaria. Having associated himself with the party of reform, he was regarded with suspicion by the Bavarian king Maximilian I and the court party, although favoured for a time by Maximilian's son, the future King Louis I.

In 1821 he was elected as mayor of Würzburg and had to give up his professorship and his seat in the Landtag, but he continued to agitate for reform. In 1825 and 1831 he was again elected to the Landtag, this time as deputy for the city, but the king refused to give him the permission needed to leave his office as mayor for the Landtag sessions. A speech delivered by Behr in 1832 was regarded as seditious, and he was arrested. In spite of his assertion of loyalty to the principle of monarchy he was detained in custody, and in 1836 was found guilty of seeking to injure the king. He then admitted his offence; but he was not released from prison until 1839, and the next nine years of his life were passed under police supervision at Passau and Regensburg.

In 1848 he obtained a free pardon and a sum of money as compensation, and was elected to the German national assembly which met at Frankfurt in May of that year. He passed his remaining days at Bamberg.

== Works ==
Behr's chief writings are:

- Darstellung der Bedürfnisse, Wünsche und Hoffnungen deutscher Nation (Aschaffenburg, 1816)
- Die Verfassung and Verwaltung des Striates (Nuremberg, 1811-1812)
- Von den rechtlichen Grenzen der Einwirkung des Deutschen Bundes auf die Verfassung, Gesetzgebung, and Rechlspflege seiner Gliederstaaten (Stuttgart, 1820).
