= Ycuá Bolaños supermarket fire =

2004 fire in Asunción, Paraguay

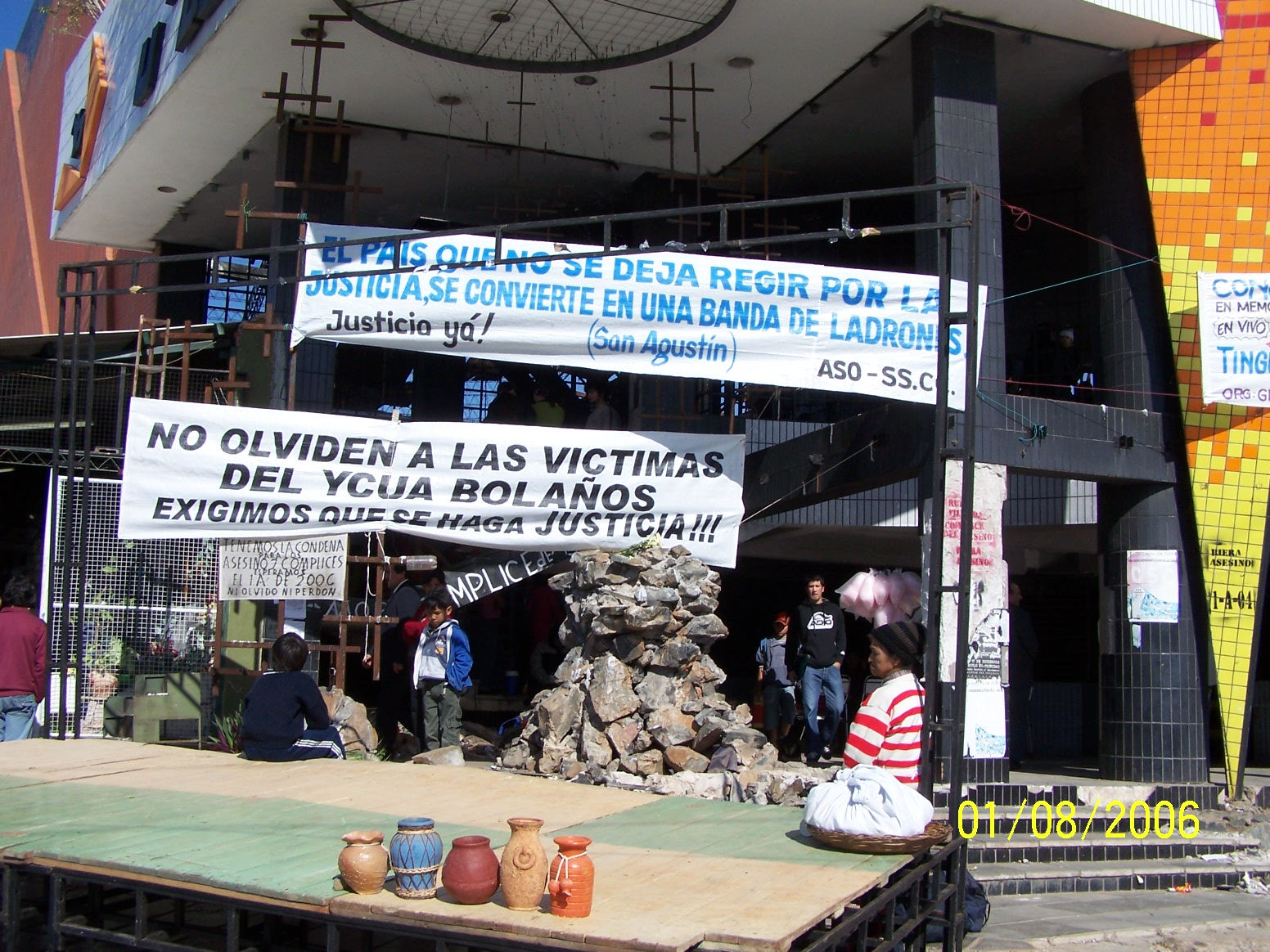
- Entrance of the Ycuá Bolaños V supermarket on August 1, 2006, two years after the fire. Banners of protest demanding justice for the victims hang on the sides of the building.
- Date: 1 August 2004
- Time: 11:25 UTC-4 (15:25 UTC)
- Location: Asunción, Paraguay; 25°15′24″S 57°35′02″W
- Cause: Ignition of a faulty barbecue chimney that leaked hot flammable gases into the ceiling
- Deaths: 424
- Injuries: 360

The Ycuá Bolaños supermarket fire, also known as the Ycuá Bolaños Tragedy, occurred on 1 August 2004 in Asunción, Paraguay. After the fire broke out, exits were locked to prevent people from stealing merchandise. The building also lacked adequate fire protection systems. Over 400 people were killed and more than 300 were injured. The president of the supermarket company, as well as various employees, were later sentenced to prison terms for their actions during the fire.

== Background ==
The Ycuá Bolaños V supermarket, located in the Paraguayan capital Asunción, opened on 7 December 2001. The two-story building consisted of an underground parking garage on the lower level and a sales area and food court on the second story. Two separate mezzanines contained administrative offices and an extension of the food court.

According to the defense attorney of the building's owner, the bakery and food court kitchen were not properly ventilated, which caused smoke and gas to accumulate in the building. The structure also lacked a fire sprinkler system and the smoke detectors did not work.

== Fire ==
The fire broke out on 1 August 2004, with two explosions on the first floor, when the supermarket was packed with customers shopping and eating. As the fire came down the stairway from the main shopping area, the charge was so hot people were burnt to ashes and bones, and cars that were filled with gasoline started to combust and explode, causing shoppers to be burned by the subsequent explosions or suffocate owing to the building's unventilated system inside. The fire burned for seven hours before firefighters were able to extinguish it. The final death toll was 424, along with more than 300 injured. The fire was believed by prosecutors to be caused by the ignition of a buildup of grease and charcoal remains inside a chimney over a grill.

Several survivors of the fire and volunteer firefighters alleged that, when the fire broke out, doors within the complex were deliberately closed under the direction of the owners, Juan Pío Paiva and his son, Víctor Daniel, trapping people inside, in order to prevent people from fleeing with merchandise without paying for it. The management of the shopping center denied the charge. Paiva, his son and a security guard surrendered to the police and were formally charged.

== Aftermath ==
On 5 December 2006, Juan Pío Paiva, Víctor Daniel Paiva and the security guard were convicted of involuntary manslaughter with a maximum penalty of five years in prison. The prosecution, however, was seeking a 25-year prison term. As the verdict was read, angry survivors and family members of the deceased started a violent demonstration inside the courtroom, which later spread onto the streets of Asunción. The prosecution demanded a retrial.

On 2 February 2008, a new court ruled that the trio committed negligent homicide. Juan Pío Paiva, president of the company, received a sentence of 12 years in prison. His son Víctor Daniel Paiva, present at the start of the fire, was sentenced to 10 years in prison. Security guard Daniel Areco, who closed the doors, was sentenced to five years in prison. Additionally, shareholder Humberto Casaccia, also present at the start of the fire, was sentenced to two-and-a-half years in prison for endangering people in the workplace. Architect Bernardo Ismachowiez, who both designed and built the complex, spent two years under house arrest for "dangerous activities in construction". Both Víctor Daniel and Juan Pío were released on probation in 2013 and 2014, respectively, after a ruling from the Court of Appeals decided they were to serve the remainder of the sentence in liberty for good behavior.

Víctor Daniel Paiva died in 2020 owing to COVID-19 complications, and Juan Pío Paiva died in 2025 owing to diabetes.
