= Joost Augusteijn =

Dutch historian and lecturer

Joost Augusteijn (born 24 July 1960, in Amsterdam) is a Dutch historian and lecturer. He was formerly a lecturer in Modern Irish History at Trinity College Dublin and Queen's University Belfast. He currently is an Associate professor of European History at Leiden University.

Augusteijn earned his PhD at the University of Amsterdam on the history of the Irish Republican Army. He has written many books including 'Patrick Pearse: The Making of a Revolutionary' and 'The Irish Revolution'.
