= Altona Bloody Sunday =

1932 clash between Nazi and Communist demonstrators in Prussia

Coordinates: 53.5517°N 9.953°E

- Part of Political violence in Germany (1918–1933)
- Date: 17 July 1932
- Location: Altona, Prussia
- Caused by: Political rally
- Result: Further weakening of Weimar Republic

Parties
NSDAP: SA; SS	Communist Party of Germany	Police of Weimar Germany

Number
7,000		

Casualties
- Deaths: 18
- Arrested: 15 communists later arrested for role in the riots

Altona Bloody Sunday (German: Altonaer Blutsonntag) is the name given to the events of 17 July 1932 when a recruitment march by the Nazi SA led to violent clashes between the police, the SA and supporters of the Communist Party of Germany (KPD) in Altona, which at the time belonged to the Prussian province of Schleswig-Holstein but is now part of Hamburg. Eighteen people were killed. The national government under Reich Chancellor Franz von Papen and Reich President Paul von Hindenburg used the incident as a rationale to depose the acting government of the Free State of Prussia by means of an emergency decree in what came to be known as the Prussian coup d'état of 20 July 1932.

== Background ==
On 16 June 1932 the Papen government, in order to show its gratitude to the Nazi Party for tolerating their minority cabinet, lifted the ban on the SS and SA that had been issued by the government of Reich Chancellor Heinrich Brüning in April 1932. This led to an expectation that there would be major altercations in the campaign for the July 31 Reichstag elections. Within a month there had been 99 deaths and 1,125 injuries across Germany in clashes mainly between Nazis and Communists. In Schleswig-Holstein, to which Altona belonged, two Social Democrats and two Communists were killed by Nazis in the first days of July. For 17 July Altona police chief Otto Eggerstedt of the Social Democratic Party (SPD) authorized a demonstration march of 7,000 uniformed SA men from all over Schleswig-Holstein that was to go through Altona’s winding old town. Because it had a working class population that voted majority Communist or Social Democratic, it was known locally as "Red Altona" and "Little Moscow”. The Communists saw the march through the workers' residential areas as a provocation. In spite of the threatening situation, Eggerstedt and his deputy were not in Altona on the day of the demonstration. Their superior, the Schleswig district president, was also not represented locally by any senior police officer.

== Bloody Sunday ==
On 17 July 1932, beginning at 12:30 p.m., participants gathered in the area between Altona’s train station and City Hall. At around 3 p.m. the march with its 7,000 participants set off in the direction of the Ottensen and Bahrenfeld districts. The procession reached Altona's old town by around 4:30 and then went into the closely built-up working-class district.

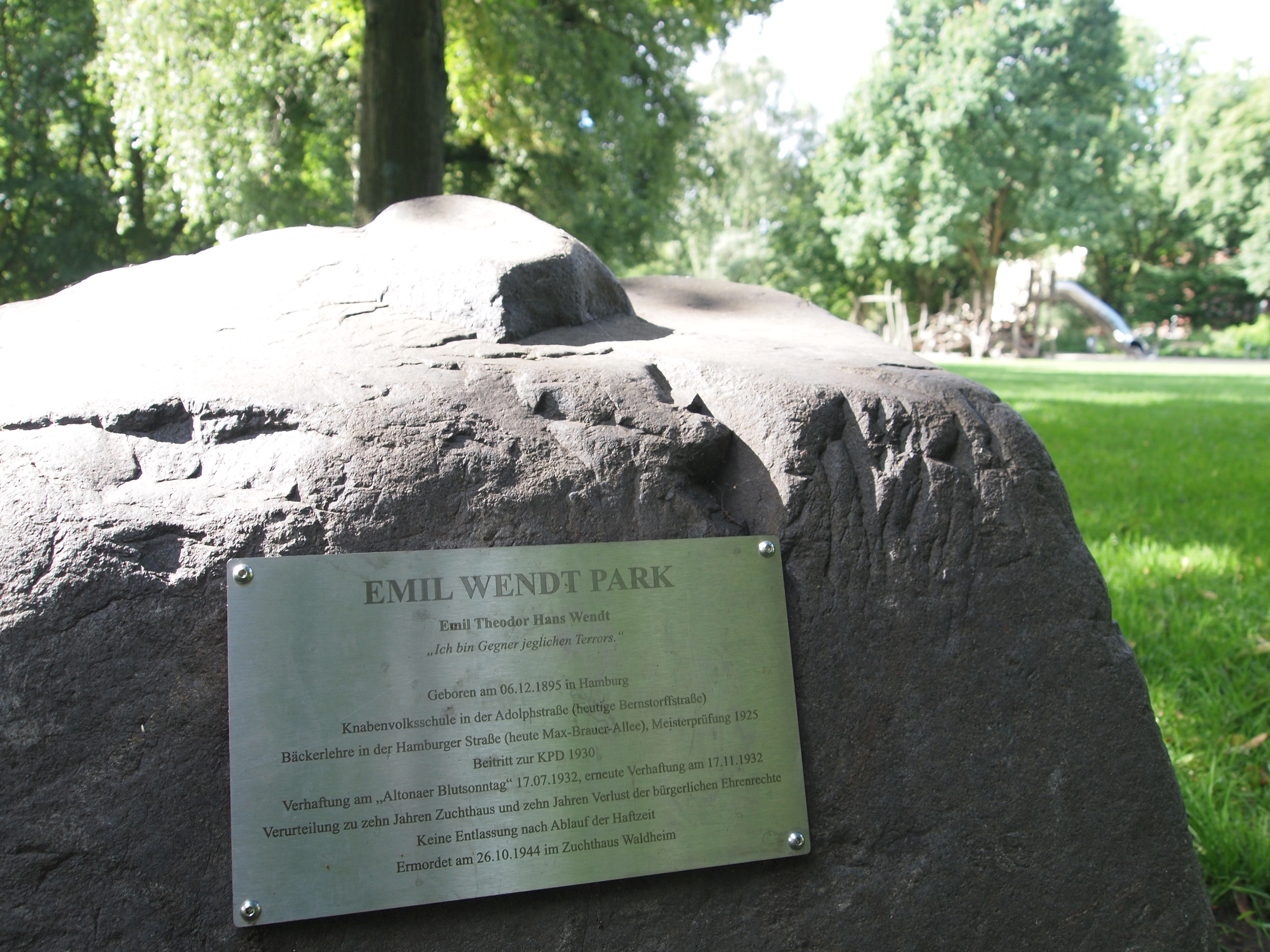
Memorial stone for the Altona Bloody Sunday at Emil Wendt Park

Shortly before 5:00, at what is today the Emil Wendt Park (recently renamed from the Walter Möller Park), a clash occurred between a crowd standing along the street and SA members from the 1st and 2nd Altona Storm groups (a ‘Storm’ consisted of 3-4 platoons). The SA plunged into Great Johannis Street and began beating those who had thrown objects at the procession.

The police forces that were called out were not able to separate the two sides, even after reinforcements came from the nearby Hamburg police. When the SA marchers were about to fall in line again, shots were fired, killing two SA men. According to the police authorities, they assumed that they and the marching column would be fired on from roofs and windows. They then pushed the SA marchers toward the train station and requested additional reinforcements from the Hamburg police, which arrived between 5:30 and 6:00. According to their own statements, they drove people off the street, shouted out orders to close windows, and shot at alleged attackers and those shooting from rooftops. SA and SS men were no longer in the area at the time. Beginning at 5:40 the Altona police conducted house searches in the area and arrested about 90 people. At 6:45 more shooting occurred, and by 7:00, according to the police report, "calm was restored". During the events, 16 residents of the area were killed by police bullets.

== Consequences ==
At the beginning of the fighting, shots were probably fired by both the SA and the Communists. Among historians the predominant assumption is that the shots that killed the two SA men were fired by Communists. The deaths of the other 16 people were, according to later investigations, caused by bullets fired from police carbine rifles. Thanks to the French resistance fighter Léon Schirmann, who re-evaluated the files on the Altona Bloody Sunday in 1992, it is now known that the fatal bullets had in fact come from police pistols. There was never evidence that protesting residents fired any weapons.

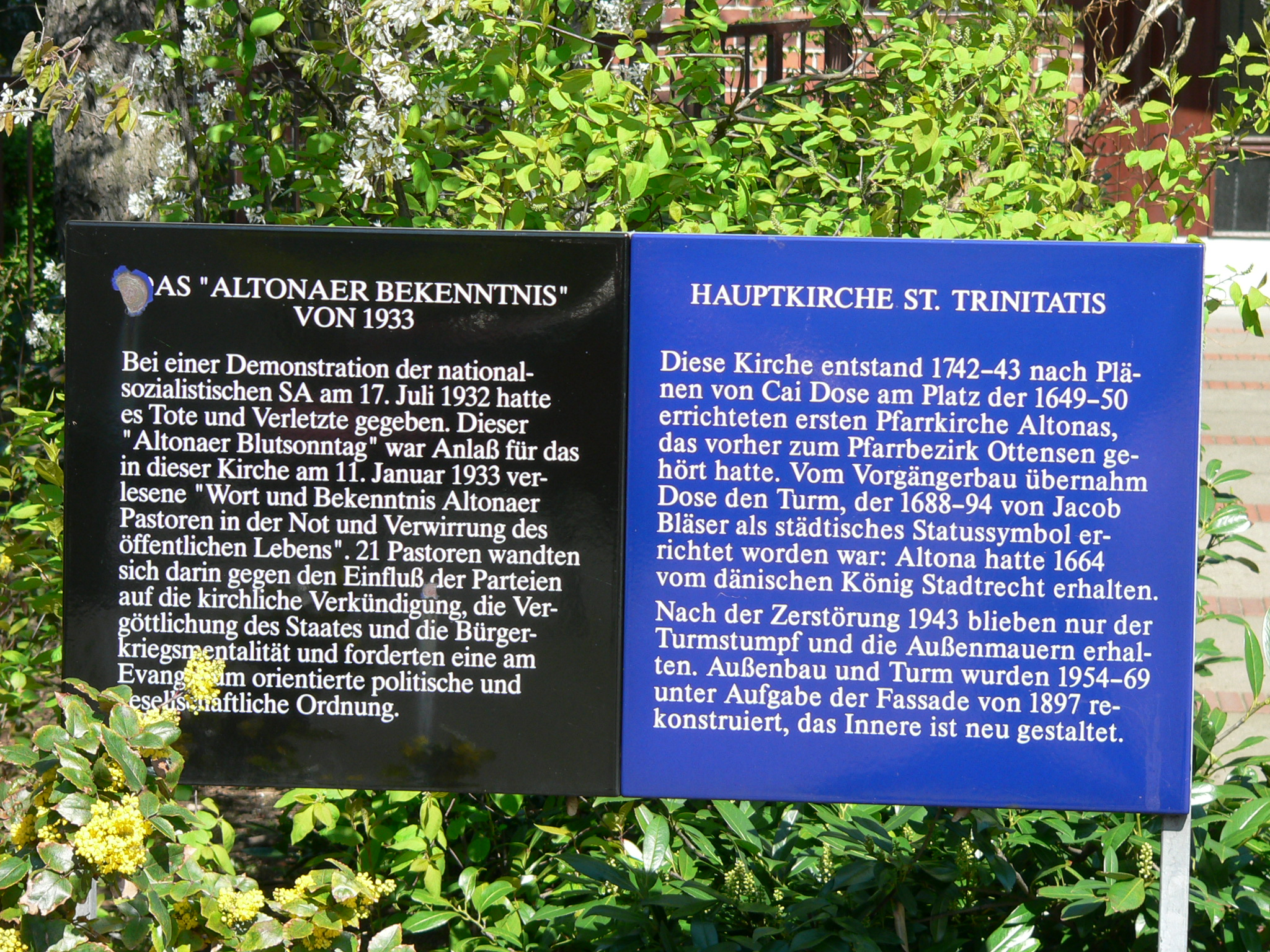
The black tablet at the St. Trinitatis church in Hamburg reads: "The Altona Confession of 1933. During a demonstration of the National Socialist SA on 17 June 1932 there were deaths and injuries. This "Altona Bloody Sunday" was the occasion for the "Message and Confession of Altona Pastors in the Distress and Confusion of Public Life" read out in this church on 11 January 1933. In it 21 pastors opposed the influence of political parties on church preaching, the deification of the state and the mentality of civil war, and called for a political and social order based on the Gospels."

Three days later, on 20 July 1932, Reich Chancellor Franz von Papen used the events in Altona as a rationale for the Prussian Coup d'état (Preußenschlag), in which the Prussian minority government that had resigned but was still acting in a caretaker capacity was deposed and the democratic constitution of the Free State of Prussia suspended.

The Lutheran pastors of Altona responded to Bloody Sunday with the Message and Confession of Altona Pastors in the Distress and Confusion of Public Life. This declaration, conceived primarily by Hans Christian Asmussen, was published and read from pulpits on 11 January 1933. This Altona Confession, which stated that the church should not enter into any alliance in the political struggles, is considered an important precursor to the more famous 1934 Barmen Declaration that was adopted by Christians who opposed the Nazi-friendly German Christian movement.

The investigations following the events were conducted by the police and judiciary solely against suspected Communists and yielded all but no results. After the National Socialists seized power, the Nazi state’s judiciary opened the so-called Bloody Sunday Trials. They were conducted on the basis of one-sided investigations and with evidence, expert opinions and witness testimonies that were in part falsified.

In the first trial, from 8 May to 2 June 1933, four of the defendants, Bruno Tesch, Walter Möller, Karl Wolff, and August Lütgens, who were classified as Communists, were sentenced to death by the Special Branch of the Altona District Court which had been set up by National Socialist judicial politicians. The chairman of the Special Court in the trial was Johannes Block. The sentence was carried out by beheading on 1 August 1933 in the courtyard of the building, now the Altona District Court. They were the first "politically-willed" executions in the Third Reich. The other eleven defendants were sentenced to prison terms, some of them for many years, including Emil Wendt, who was sentenced to 10 years. After serving his term, he was taken to the Waldheim Prison in Saxony, where he was murdered on 26 October 1944. A total of six trials related to Altona Bloody Sunday took place through 1935.

== Judicial reappraisal ==
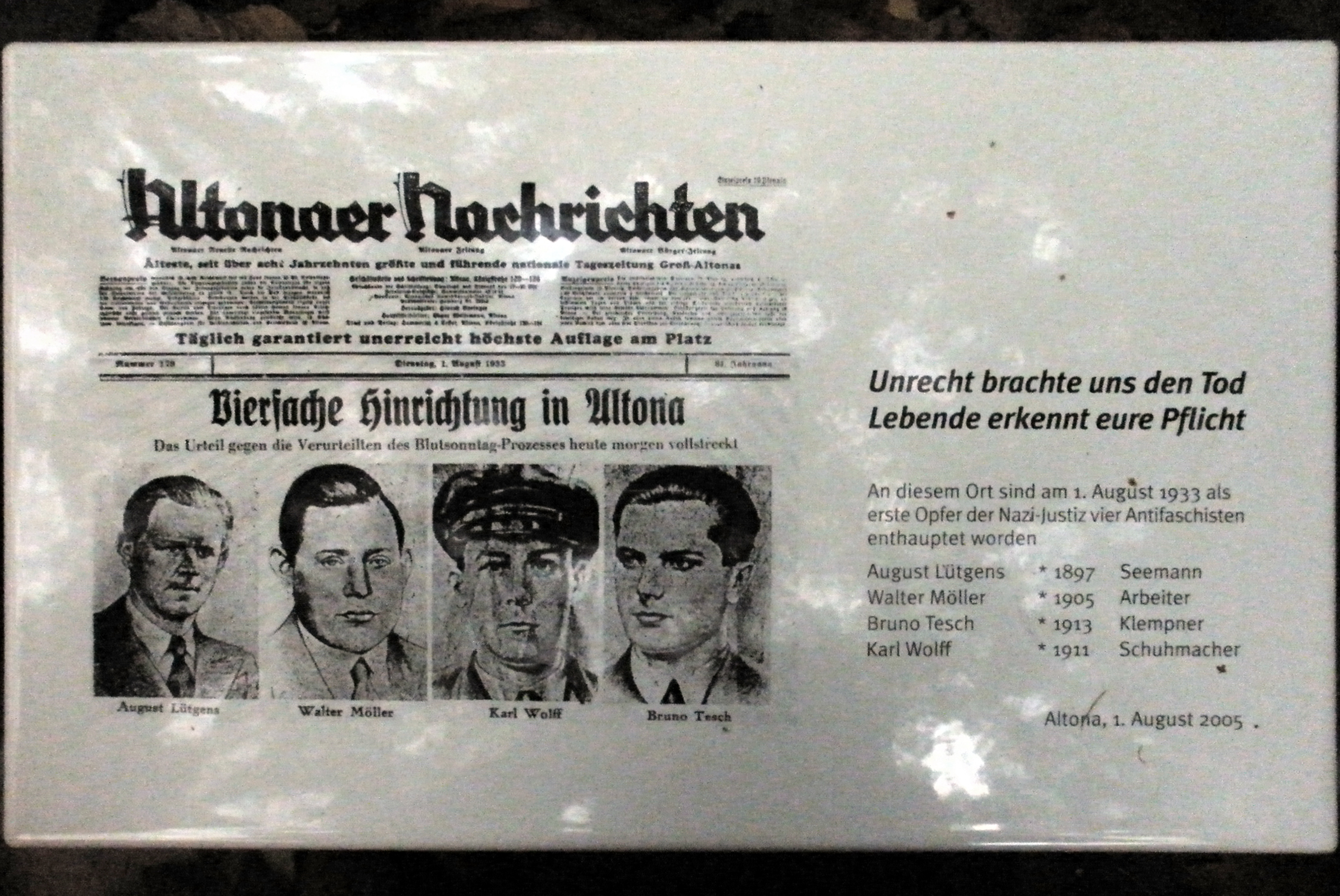
Memorial plaque for August Lütgens, Walter Möller, Karl Wolff and Bruno Tesch at the site of their execution behind the Altona District Court

It was not until 1992, after the resistance fighter Léon Schirmann re-evaluated the files from the trial stored in the court archives in Schleswig, that the Altona Bloody Sunday was once again dealt with before the Hamburg Regional Court.

Schirmann had discovered that there had been no shooting from roofs or upper floors, that no Communist gunmen had been arrested, and that no weapons had been found during house searches. Nor had the police suffered any deaths or injuries. Among the dead were no snipers; all 16 were Altona citizens uninvolved in the demonstrations who died from police bullets.

In November 1992 the court acknowledged the falsification of evidence in the trials and overturned the death sentences against the four alleged perpetrators. They were thus officially rehabilitated as victims of the Nazi regime. The policemen who had fired the fatal shots were not identified, nor were the killers of the SA men at the beginning of the bloodshed. The verdicts of the three later trials have not been overturned.

== See also ==
- The Axe of Wandsbek, a 1951 film by Falk Harnack related to the confrontation

== Bibliography ==
- Christian Zentner, Friedemann Bedürftig (1991). The Encyclopedia of the Third Reich. Macmillan, New York. ISBN 0-02-897502-2
