= August Lütgens =

German communist activist (1897–1933)

- Born: 16 December 1897; Lübeck, Germany
- Died: 3 August 1933 (aged 35); Altona, Greater Hamburg (Gau Hamburg), Germany
- Cause of death: Execution by beheading
- Occupations: Sailor; Revolutionary; Celebrity antifascist (posthumously)
- Political party: Social Democratic Party of Germany; Communist Party of Germany
- Spouse: Lisa Fiedler
- Children: 1. Franz 1922; 2. Elsa 1925

August Lütgens (16 December 1897 – 1 August 1933) was a communist activist who spent the 1920s exiled in the Soviet Union. On returning to Germany in 1930 or 1931 he became a leading member of the paramilitary "Red Front-Fighters" ("Roter Frontkämpferbund" / RFB) in the politically volatile Hamburg region. In 1932 he was involved in the Altona Bloody Sunday street battle and, following the National Socialist power grab at the start of 1933, he became a victim of "Nazi justice". On 1 August 1933 August Lütgens was executed: four men were convicted and executed at the same time, but Lütgens was identified at the time as the leading figure among them, and of the four cases, it is the one involving Lütgens that has received the most coverage subsequently.

As one of the first and most highly publicised government opponents to be executed after the rapid switch to dictatorship in 1933, August Lütgens was soon being celebrated by government opponents as "one of the first victims of fascist justice to be killed". His fame was further enhanced after 1945. Particularly in the Soviet occupation zone (relaunched in October 1949 as the Soviet sponsored German Democratic Republic / East Germany), he was celebrated as an antifascist hero. A naval academy was even named in his honour. Lütgens had been convicted in 1933 by a "special court", and in 1945 a campaign was launched in Hamburg to expose unsatisfactory aspects of his trial and secure rehabilitation for Lütgens and the three men executed with him. In 1992 the Hamburg district court reversed all four of the earlier judgements, citing "manipulations of justice" ("Justizmanipulationen").

== Biography ==
=== Provenance and early years ===
August Lütgens was born into a working class Social Democratic family in Lübeck where he grew up, the eldest of his parents' twelve children. His father was employed as an unskilled industrial metal worker. In order to feed the family it was necessary that his mother should also earn a wage: she worked as a washerwoman. Between 1903 and 1911 the boy attended school in the city. Since both parents worked long hours, for most of the time the children were left to their own devices. As the eldest of them, on returning from school at the start of each afternoon, August Lütgens found himself, in the words of one source, acting as the "household maid", looking after the other eleven children, heating up the left-overs for lunch, and preparing the family's evening meal. As his sisters grew older they were able to take over the domestic duties, however, and August took a job as an errand boy, working for a pharmacist. In the evenings he distributed the newspaper of the Metal Workers' Union.

=== At sea ===
In 1911 Lütgens left school and went to sea as a "ship's boy", spending the next few years as a sailor. He had no trouble finding work, initially working on ships sailing from Hamburg or Bremen, and later also working on Danish and English ships. When he was 16 he joined the union ("Seeleutegewerkschaft"). Soon after that he followed in his father's footsteps by joining the German Social Democratic Party (SPD). The timing of the outbreak of the First World War at the end of July 1914 caught him off-guard. He was in a foreign port at the time. Keen to avoid internment (as a foreigner) he and a comrade grabbed a rowing boat and made for the open sea. They were fished out of the water onto a German patrol boat. Instead of being taken to shore August Lütgens was informed that he had been conscripted for service in the Imperial Navy.

=== War years ===
A willingness to share his political views with fellow seamen could make him a disruptive crew member. "That is a lie and defamatory", he wrote in red ink across a propaganda poster showing a German nurse from a hospital ship being variously tortured by two English sailors. This earned him a disciplinary hearing before a military tribunal. Later, while serving on the warship SMS Westfalen, he organised a clandestine anti-war group, but someone betrayed him to the officers. Group members showed solidarity in refusing to provide investigators with large amounts of incriminating information. He nevertheless faced a second trial, seemingly more serious than the first, before a military tribunal at some stage around 1916/17, and was determined to be "unreliable". After serving a brief jail term he was sent to Flanders from where, it was evidently hoped by the prosecuting authorities, he would not return. He spent time fighting alongside others in the "First Sailors' Regiment" on the "Western front". However, by the time war ended in 1918 August Lütgens was back with high-seas fleet in Wilhelmshaven. He joined the anti-war Spartacus League as the war ground to a conclusion in 1918, and when the league became a founding pillar (along with the now fragmenting "Independent Social Democratic Party") of the Communist Party at the start of 1919, Lütgens evidently became a communist, though sources are unclear as to when he actually joined the party.

=== Revolution ===
The succession of major, if mainly localised, uprisings that came to be chronicled as Germany's "November revolution" had their origins with naval mutinies in Wilhelmshaven and Kiel, which then spread inland with the demoralised soldiers coming home from the western (and other) front(s), especially to towns and cities in Germany's industrial heartlands. Lütgens was among the leaders on the rebel side. Fighting in Wilhelmshaven persisted, and in January 1919 a group of naval officers and "professional soldiers" launched an organised counter-attack, targeting "communists", after which striking shipyard workers returned to work: in the "quasi-military" terms in which observers were inclined to assess the situation at the time, Lütgens was on the losing side. In May 1919 he was sentenced to an "exemplary" twelve-year jail term for his part in the uprising. During his trial Lütgens found himself on the receiving end of hostile publicity after a bank employee testified at his trial that he had been involved in the theft of 300,000 marks that had been set aside to be sent to Soviet Russia. The truth of the matter is impossible to determine: nor is it clear whether the court took the evidence of the bank employee seriously. Nevertheless, the hostile mainstream newspapers of the political centre and right made much of the bank clerk's allegations, branding Lütgens a bandit and a robber. For better and worse, he was now a man with a media profile.

Following sentencing he was transferred to the main jail in Bremen. A few months later, however, the wardens making their rounds at the start of the day found that cell 138, which had been assigned to Lütgens, was empty. Nothing was broken: there was no sign of a struggle, the bars in the window were sound and even the door was securely locked. It was only some time later than someone noticed that the uniform - including the cap - of a prison guard were missing. August Lütgens had left the prison unimpeded, having taken the precaution of dressing himself as a prison guard. Sources mention but do not identify the comrades who had helped him. The escapee faced another trial, which this time he did not attend, and was sentenced to an additional three-year jail term. By this time he was in Denmark, however. Over the next few months he worked on the ships on the "North Sea" (identified on English maps as the "Baltic Sea"), returning at one point during 1920 to Germany, but it seemed unwise to stay for very long. Instead he made his way to Petrograd (as Saint Petersburg had been rebranded in 1914) where he applied successfully for political exile, and settled down for ten years.

=== Lisa ===
In Petrograd he befriended Lisa Fiedler, one of five children of a Hamburg family who had relocated a few years earlier in response to an appeal from the recently installed Soviet government for skilled workers. August Lütgens married Lisa Fiedler in 1922. Their son Franz was born in the same year. Their daughter, Elsa, followed in 1925. At some point they moved to the central Moscow district of Zamoskvoretskaya (Замоскворецкая) where August Lütgens obtained factory work. He later trained and qualified for work as a sea captain, and returned to work at sea.

=== Return to Germany ===
Sources are a little ambivalent about the reasons for and timing of August Lütgens' return to Germany. In the long aftermath of the Great Depression unemployment levels were desperately high. Politics were becoming increasingly polarised and spilling onto the streets, as desperate voters turned to the Communist Party and / or the populist National Socialist Party. After the 1930 election (and even more after the elections in 1932) political polarisation was reflected in the parliamentary deadlock which would open the way for the Hitler government to take power in January 1933. The more heroic explanation for the return of August Lütgens is that, from Moscow, he became aware of the desperate condition of the German working class and knew it was his patriotic duty to return to Germany and help. An alternative or complementary explanation is based on the fact that the Brüning government in Germany, desperate to take some of the heat out of the political situation, implemented a political amnesty, as a result of which Lütgens calculated that if he returned to Germany he was no longer likely to be sent back to prison for his involvement in the so-called "November revolution" of 1918/19. It is not impossible that personal considerations also played their part: he arrived in 1930 or 1931 without fanfare, while Lisa Lütgens remained in the Zamoskvoretskaya apartment that she had hitherto shared with her husband and children. The children were still with her: at some point her mother had also moved in.

He made his way via Leningrad (as Petrograd had been renamed in 1924) and Stettin to Lübeck where he had grown up. He quickly moved on to the nearby port city of Hamburg, and from there to Altona. In 1938 Altona was subsumed into the expanded Hamburg conurbation, but in the early 1930s it was still a determinedly separate municipality, with an important commercial and manufacturing sector and a large politically engaged working class. It was precisely the sort of expanding and vibrant place that the populists sought to politicise in support of their political agenda: but by 1930 people were speaking of "Red Altona". In the battle for hearts and minds National Socialism had lost out to Communism. At some point the populists evidently gave up on the hearts and minds and decided, instead, that Altona must be brought round to their way of thinking through a strategy based on terror. It was here that August Lütgens settled in the commercial heart of the town, close to the fish market. Like millions of others in Germany at this time, he was unemployed and living on welfare.

=== Political paramilitary ===
In Altona he joined the "Association of Red Front-Fighters" ("Roter Frontkämpferbund" / RFB), a paramilitary organisation with close links to the Communist Party and branch operations across the country. It had been founded in 1925 and, in response to intensified street fighting, banned by the government in 1929. Its emergence was seen by members and supporters as a defensive reaction to the various paramilitary right-wing groupings that had been a feature of the German political scene since the end of the war. By 1930 the enemy had become the populist paramilitaries underpinning the seemingly unstoppable rise of Adolf Hitler. Lütgens quickly became a leading figure in the Altona RFB, organising protection for the homes of workers in the "red districts" of town, which by now were increasingly being subjected to "Nazi street terror".

=== Altona Bloody Sunday ===
Altona Bloody Sunday was the name given to a violent battle that took place on the streets of Altona on 17 July 1932. It was a fight involving National Socialist paramilitaries, Communist sympathisers and the police. It took place two and a half weeks after the government had lifted a ban on National Socialist paramilitaries. An estimated 5,000 -7,000 National Socialist supporters arrived in Altona - according to some sources travelling under police protection - from all over Germany, and confronted a large number of communist supporting Altona residents, possibly including August Lütgens. Accounts of what happened on Altona Bloody Sunday very widely, depending on the perspective of the writer, but there seems to be a consensus that the event left 18 people dead and at least seventy more badly injured.

A wave of arrests followed. However, it was only on 25 August 1932, slightly more than a month after the battle, that August Lütgens was arrested at his girlfriend's apartment in the centre of Hamburg, and detained.

=== An inconclusive trial ===
He was held in custody pending trial. That took place in February 1933 a week or so after the Hitler government took power. The prosecution had difficulty in finding evidence of any crime committed by Lütgens. In the end, however, according to at least one source they settled on a charge that he had been distributing banned [political] leaflets. On 22 February 1933 the trial was suspended after the court determined that there was no convincing evidence against the accused. Lütgens remained in custody, however, while the authorities considered their next move.

=== Dealing with communists ===
On the night of 27 February 1933 Reichstag building in Berlin suffered a destructive arson attack. The alacrity with which the government responded has been taken by subsequent historians as an indication that they had somehow known in advance that the arson attack would take place. The Reichstag Fire Decree, suspending a range of basic civil liberties, was issued on 28 February 1933. The government let it be known that "communists" had been responsible for the attack, and a wave of arrests of known Communist Party leaders and activists rapidly ensued. As the trial of August Lütgens the previous week had demonstrated, the government still could not rely on the German courts to produce the right verdict when those arrested communists faced trial. The solution that presented itself was the revival of "special courts". By the end of March 1933 a network of special courts, specially designed to deal with political trials, was in place across Germany. As well as dealing with individuals arrested in the aftermath of the Reichstag fire, preparations were made to use the special court for various other self-evidently political trials that had not yet, from the government perspective, been satisfactorily concluded. The case of August Lütgens was one of these.

=== Justice under National Socialism ===
On 8 May 1933 a mass-trial of 22 "revolutionary workers" opened before a session of the special court in Altona. Although it was not formally a murder trial, it was understood that the hearing proceeded from the fact that two of the eighteen people killed during the "Bloody Sunday" fighting had been Sturmabteilung (SA) paramilitaries, shot dead, according to a communist source, by fellow National Socialist fighters or, perhaps, by policemen attending the incident on the instructions of Mayor Otto Eggerstedt. (Note: There is no indication that the authorities were in any way interested in investigating the other sixteen "Bloody Sunday" deaths reported.) (Otto Eggerstedt, as a member of the Social Democratic Party, was himself arrested on 27 May 1933, a week before the conclusion of the trial, on suspicion of having breached of the government's new Press Law.)

It was alleged in court that a member of the security services had found a hand-drafted sketch at August Lütgens' apartment of a section of the street outside the house in Altona where Lütgens was living at the time with his girlfriend. The sketch was presented as evidence that Lütgens had been the individual principally responsible for organising a sniper attack during the "Bloody Sunday" fighting on the streets of Altona. However, the court was unable to clarify either where Lütgens had been during the afternoon in question nor even, indeed, whether he had participated directly in the street fighting at all. It subsequently emerged that the sketch presented in evidence had been a falsification by the authorities, hastily pushed in with a pile of papers that had indeed been seized from the apartment, in order to provide evidence for Lütgens illegal activities with the RFB.

The trial before the Special Court in Altona concluded on 2 June 1933. Four of the accused were sentenced to death. The four were August Lütgens, Bruno Tesch, Karl Wolff and Walter Möller. Bizarrely, in view of the death sentence handed out, the court judgment itself included a statement in respect of Lütgens, who was presented as the most significant of the four, "It is not proven that the accused Lütgens himself took part in the violence against the SA contingent on the afternoon of 17 July 1932". (Note: "Es ist nicht erwiesen, dass der Angeklagte Lütgens sich selbst am Nachmittag des 17. Juli 1932 an Gewalttätigkeiten gegen den SA-Umzug beteiligt hat".)

In a well-publicised show described by one critical source as "medieval", the four men were executed by decapitation in the inner yard of the jail at the court complex (since 1975 known as the "Max-Brauer-Allee court complex") in Altona on 1 August 1933. The executioner used a hatchet ("Handbeil"). The authorities arranged for 75 political prisoners to be assembled in the court yard in order to watch the executions. The youngest of the four, Bruno Tesch was just 20.

The novelist Arnold Zweig used the story of August Lütgens' final months as the backdrop for his 1947 novel Das Beil von Wandsbek ("The hatchet of Wandsbek"). The book provided the basis for a film in 1952 and another in 1981. It was widely distributed and well known in the German Democratic Republic (East Germany) but remained almost entirely unknown in the German Federal Republic (West Germany). It never purported to be other than a novel, but the narrative nevertheless drew much of its power from true facts incorporated and referenced in it. It became part of the wider process whereby during the 1930s, 1940s and 1950s August Lütgens became a hero of Communist propaganda and iconography. This ensured that Lütgens became well known to generations of German antifascists, but it also caused a conflation of truth and fiction worthy of Hollywood: this has sometimes proven hard to disentangle in popular consciousness.

== Campaign for rehabilitation ==
In the end it took slightly more than sixty years before friends, relatives, international justice activists and other campaigners secured from a Hamburg court posthumous rehabilitation for August Lütgens, and the three others executed with him at the Altona court complex on 1 August 1933. After 1945 there had been at least 14 occasions on which applications to have the 1933 Altona Bloody Sunday verdict lifted or reversed were simply ignored or rejected by the Hamburg prosecutor's office, thereby implicitly endorsing the constitutional legality of the National Socialist's "special court". In the end it was only the publicity given to the affair following meticulous research undertaken by the French author and former Résistance fighter, Léon Schirmann that forced Hamburg justice officials to take the rehabilitation campaign seriously.

After decades of procrastination, and following yet another application, a retrial was ordered on the sixtieth anniversary of Altona Bloody Sunday. In November 1992 a criminal division of the Hamburg district court decided to overturn earlier judgments and acquit Lütgens, Tesch, Möller and Wolff on grounds of "proven manipulations of justice".

== Celebration ==
The bodies of the four executed men - many sources identify them as victims not of execution but of murder - were quietly transported to Berlin and there cremated. Not till 1935 did the authorities secretly bury the urns containing their ashes in a corner of Berlin's Marzahn Park Cemetery. After the war had ended these remains were sent back to Hamburg and in 1947 reburied in the vast Ohlsdorf Cemetery in the special section set aside for antifascist resistance fighters. The small "pillow-stone" commemorating August Lütgens is positioned eleven places along from the left in the fourth row of the collected memorial stones. More recently four commemorative "Stolpersteine" have been arranged in a square formation on the pavement outside the court house in which Lütgens and his three comrades were sentenced to death.

The parkland surrounding the former Altona Hospital ("Alte Krankenhäuser Altona") has been renamed "August-Lütgens-Park" in commemoration and celebration. The park is one of several public amenities carrying the name of August Lütgens.

The port city of Rostock, which was part of the German Democratic Republic (East Germany) between 1949 and 1989/90 also paid special tribute to August Lütgens. The government controlled training and education facility of the Deutsche Seereederei, the organisation responsible for all the East German shipping involved in foreign trade since 1952, changed its name to GST-Marineschule „August Lütgens“ in 1980, and a memorial tablet was placed in the inner courtyard of the training academy in Rostock's Krischanweg (street). The Rostock sculptor Wolfgang Eckardt created a medal showing his portrait. In 2001 an unknown attacker destroyed the memorial tablet in Rostock, but the cultural office of the city council has given repeat assurances that during the course of redevelopment along the Krischanweg the memorial will be appropriately restored, with a guarantee of public access.
