= Bruno Tesch (antifascist) =

German communism activist (1913–1933)

Bruno Guido Camillo Tesch (22 April 1913 – 1 August 1933) was a German communist and member of the Young Communist League of Germany. At age 20, he was convicted of murder and executed in connection with the Altona Bloody Sunday riot (Altonaer Blutsonntag), a Sturmabteilung (SA) march on 17 July 1932 that turned violent and led to 18 people being shot and killed. His conviction was overturned in November 1992.

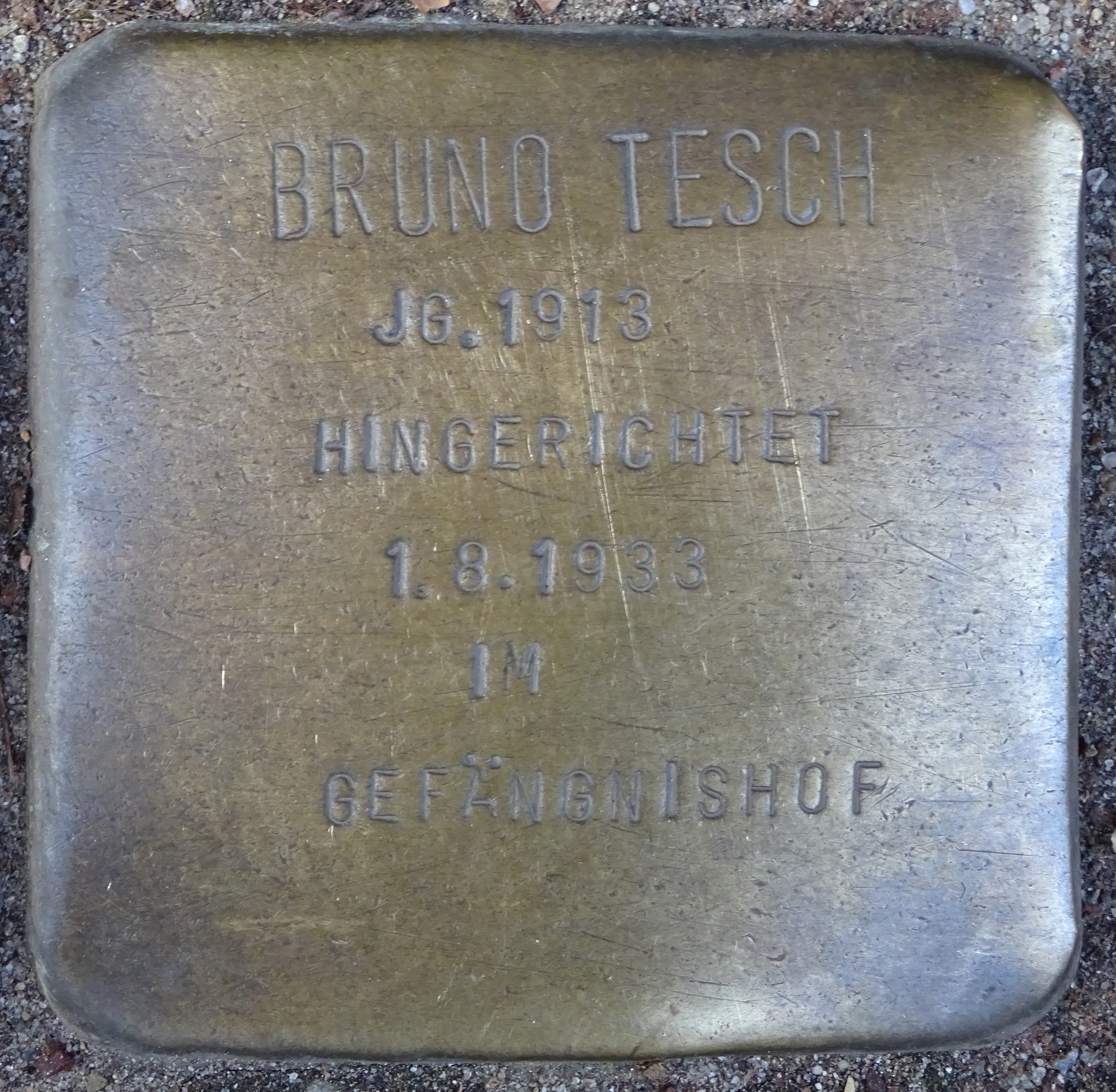
Stolperstein for Bruno Tesch at Max-Brauer-Allee 89 in Hamburg-Altona-Nord, Germany

== Life ==
Born in Kiel, Germany, to an Italian mother, Tesch spent his childhood in Italy before moving to live with his stepfather in Hamburg in 1925, where he was an apprentice plumber. Finding himself unemployed after his apprenticeship was over, he entered the Freiwilliger Arbeitsdienst (FAD), or Volunteer Work Service. Politically radical, he joined the Socialist Worker Youth (Sozialistische Arbeiterjugend) in 1930, but soon switched to the Young Communist League of Germany (Kommunistischer Jugendverband Deutschlands).

== Altona Bloody Sunday ==
On 17 July 1932, a violent confrontation happened between the Sturmabteilung (SA) and Schutzstaffel (SS), the police, and Communist Party (KPD) supporters in Altona, later known in German history as the Altona Bloody Sunday (German: Altonaer Blutsonntag). Some Communists, with Tesch among them, tried to disrupt a march by the Nazis through a working-class area in Altona. Arguments and shoving escalated, culminating in gunfire that killed two SA members and 16 others, the latter group likely by uncontrolled police gunfire. Tesch, who was involved in the violence, was later alleged to have fired shots in the incident.

After the National Socialist German Workers Party seized power, the case was brought before the National Socialist Special Court (Sondergerichte) in Altona. Although the investigation turned up no solid proof of Tesch's guilt, and it could not be proved that Tesch had brought a weapon to the demonstration, he was nonetheless sentenced to death along with August Lütgens, Walter Möller and Karl Wolff. When Hermann Göring refused to commute the sentences of the four, on 1 August 1933, in the courthouse courtyard – now home to Altona's Local Court – they were beheaded. These were the first officially declared executions in the Third Reich.

== Memorials and acquittal ==
Arnold Zweig's 1947 book The Axe of Wandsbek was written about Altona Bloody Sunday and was subsequently filmed in East Germany in 1951 (and, again, in West Germany in 1981). In East Germany, a school in Klausdorf as well as a street in Wismar were named after Bruno Tesch. Despite political resistance, a former comprehensive school in Hamburg-Altona was named after Bruno Tesch.

All those sentenced to death had their convictions overturned on 13 November 1992 by the Hamburg State Court. Further sentences meted out by the Sondergericht in connection with the Altonaer Blutsonntag were reversed on 21 June 1996 and 29 June 1998.

A Stolperstein was created in his honor and is located at Max-Brauer-Allee 89 in Hamburg-Altona-Nord.

== See also ==
- The Condemned of Altona: a play written by Jean-Paul Sartre, known in Great Britain as Loser Wins.
