= Ireland unfree shall never be at peace =

1915 funeral oration given by Patrick Pearse

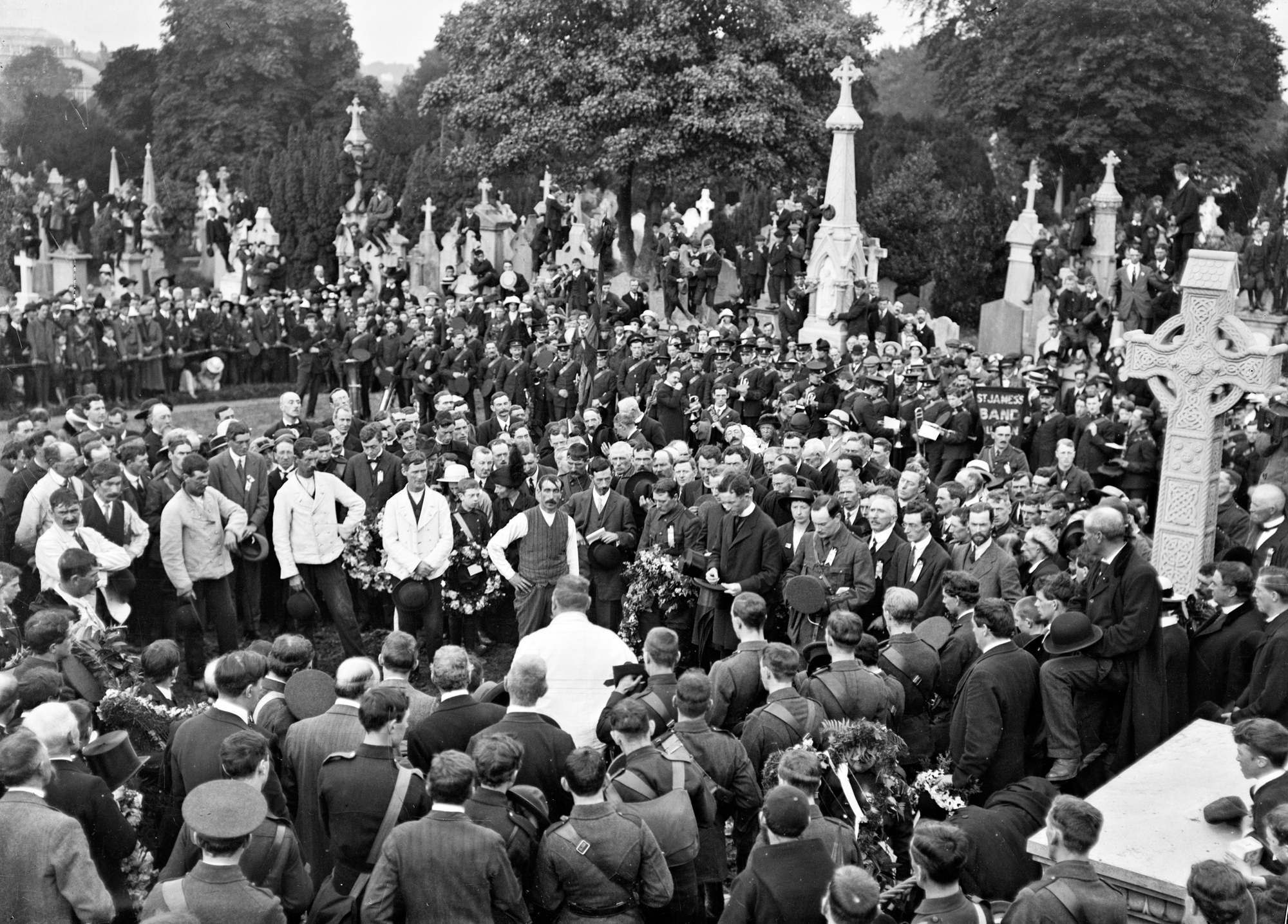
Crowds gathered at the graveside of O'Donovan Rossa. Pearse is centre-right (in uniform)

"Ireland unfree shall never be at peace" were the climactic closing words of the graveside oration of Patrick Pearse at the funeral of Jeremiah O'Donovan Rossa on 1 August 1915. The oration roused Irish republican feeling and was a significant element in the lead-up to the Easter Rising of 1916.

== Death of O'Donovan Rossa ==
O'Donovan Rossa, a founding member of the Irish Republican Brotherhood (popularly known as the Fenians), died in New York on 29 June 1915, aged 84. Another Fenian leader, John Devoy, cabled Tom Clarke in Dublin to ask what should be done. Clarke replied, "Send his body home at once." Clarke and Thomas MacDonagh began planning a large funeral as a demonstration of support for Irish independence.

Clarke chose Patrick Pearse, a barrister and schoolteacher who was known as the foremost orator of the time, to give the graveside oration. At that time republican leaders were refraining from making inflammatory speeches for fear of imprisonment at a crucial time in the preparations for a rising. When Pearse asked how far he should go, Clarke answered, "Make it hot as hell, throw discretion to the winds."

== Funeral and oration ==
On arrival in Dublin, Rossa's remains were taken to the Pro-Cathedral and lay before the High Altar for one night, with a guard of Irish Volunteers. They then lay in state in City Hall, Dublin, again with a guard of honour, until the funeral. Thousands of Volunteers followed the hearse to Glasnevin Cemetery and hundreds of thousands lined the route.

Following the interment, Pearse delivered his oration. He spoke "on behalf of a new generation that has been re-baptised in the Fenian faith" and called on the Irish people to stand together for the achievement of the freedom of Ireland. And, he said, "we know only one definition of freedom: it is Tone's definition, it is Mitchel's definition, it is Rossa's definition" (that is, an Irish Republic). The tone of the oration made it very clear that an attempt would soon be made to establish an Irish Republic by force of arms. The oration concluded with a challenge to the "Defenders of this Realm":

They think that they have pacified Ireland. They think that they have purchased half of us and intimidated the other half. They think that they have foreseen everything, think that they have provided against everything; but the fools, the fools, the fools! – they have left us our Fenian dead, and while Ireland holds these graves, Ireland unfree shall never be at peace.

The speech was followed by a volley of shots from a mixed party of Irish Volunteers and Irish Citizen Army men, and a Citizen Army bugler sounded "The Last Post".

== Significance of the oration ==
Rossa's funeral, and Pearse's oration, had the desired effect of mobilising Republicans and creating the conditions for a rising. Eight months later, on 24 April 1916, Pearse stood in the portico of the General Post Office in Dublin and read the Proclamation of the Republic. Although the Easter Rising was short-lived, it set in train the events that led to the formation of the Irish Free State in 1922.

Today, Pearse's funeral oration is considered one of the most important speeches in 20th-century Irish history. The manuscript of this speech is now held in the Pearse Museum, Rathfarnham, Dublin. The oration is re-enacted daily for visitors to Glasnevin Cemetery.
