= D'Artagnan (disambiguation) =

Charles de Batz de Castelmore d'Artagnan (c. 1611 – 25 June 1673) was captain of Louis XIV's Musketeers.

D'Artagnan may also refer to:

- D'Artagnan (food company), a producer of specialty food products
- 14238 d'Artagnan, a main-belt asteroid
- dArtagnan (band), a German folk rock band
- D'Artagnan, the protagonist of The d'Artagnan Romances, a set of three novels by Alexandre Dumas

== See also ==
- Artagnan, a French municipality in Midi-Pyrénées region
- Son of d'Artagnan, a 1950 Italian historical adventure film
- The Secret Mark of D'Artagnan, a 1962 Italian-French adventure film
- The Three Musketeers: D'Artagnan, a 2023 film
