= Géologique de Saucats et La Brède National Nature Reserve =

Place in Nouvelle-Aquitaine, France

- IUCN category III (natural monument or feature)
- Interactive map of Géologique de Saucats et La Brède National Nature Reserve
- Location: Gironde, France
- Nearest city: Bordeaux
- Coordinates: 44.6540°N 0.5969°W
- Area: 75.5 ha (187 acres)
- Established: 5 September 1982
- Governing body: Association RNG Saucats-La Brède

Saucats et La Brède Geologic Formation
- Stratigraphic range: Aquitanian–Serravallian
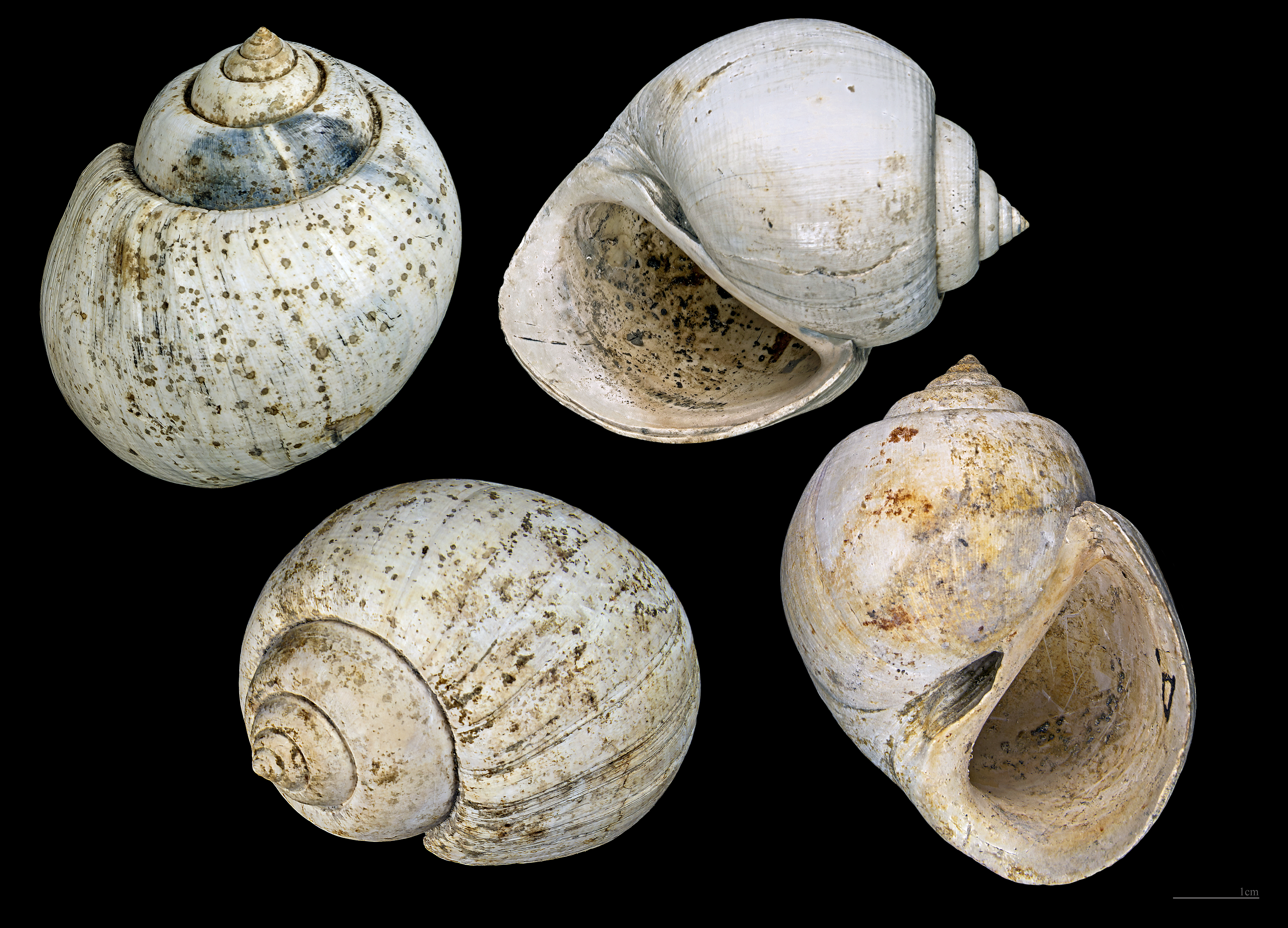
- Ampullaria ponderosa (coll.MHNT)
- Type: Fossil sites

Lithology
- Primary: Faluns

Location
- Coordinates: 44.6540°N 0.5969°W
- Region: Nouvelle-Aquitaine
- Country: France

Type section
- Named for: Saucats and La Brède
- Géologique de Saucats et La Brède National Nature Reserve (France)

The Géologique de Saucats et La Brède National Nature Reserve (RNN62) is a geological national nature reserve in Gironde. Established in 1982 with an area of 75.5 hectares (187 acres), it protects six sites bearing outcrops of solidified shell sand or faluns. It also includes the stratotype for the Aquitanian and Burdigalian stages.

== Location ==
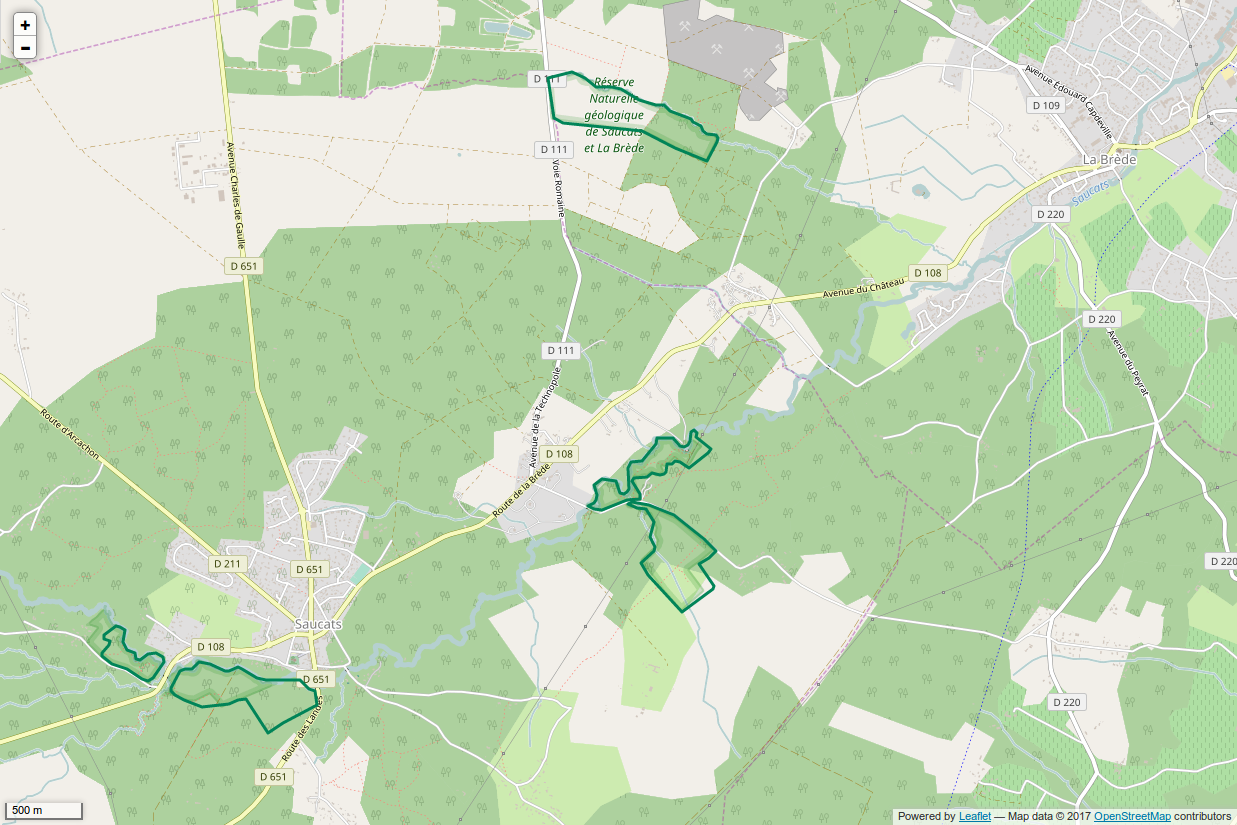
Surrounding of the nature reserve.

It is located in Nouvelle-Aquitaine in the Gironde department, over the communes of Saucats and La Brède 20 km (12 mi) south of Bordeaux and in the heart of the Landes forest. It includes six sites divided ito three geographic sectors, and covers a total area of 75.5 hectares (187 acres).

== History of the site and reserve ==
Belonging to the Aquitaine Basin, this site bears an important series of deposits from the Cenozoic era, in the shape of outcrops. Those can be seen particularly on the banks of two streams: the Saucats (or St Jean d'Étampes) and its tributary the Brousteyrot. Some of those outcrops served as basis for the description of the Aquitanian stratotype (established by Charles Mayer in 1858) and the Burdigalian stratotype (established by Charles Depéret in 1892). Those were regularly studied by paleontologists for nearly a century (including Benoist, Degrange-Touzin, Cossmann, Peyrot, and Daguin) and exploited by various collectors until the creation of the nature reserve. In 1980 the Association pour la Réserve Géologique de Saucats - La Brède was established to protect this patrimony and to open it up. The nature reserve was established in 1982 under ministerial order. It was the first geological reserve in France.

== Ecology (biodiversity, ecological interest, etc.) ==
The principal interest of this site is geological. Most of the stages can be seen across the narrow streams in small glens; they include interesting biotes.

=== Geology ===
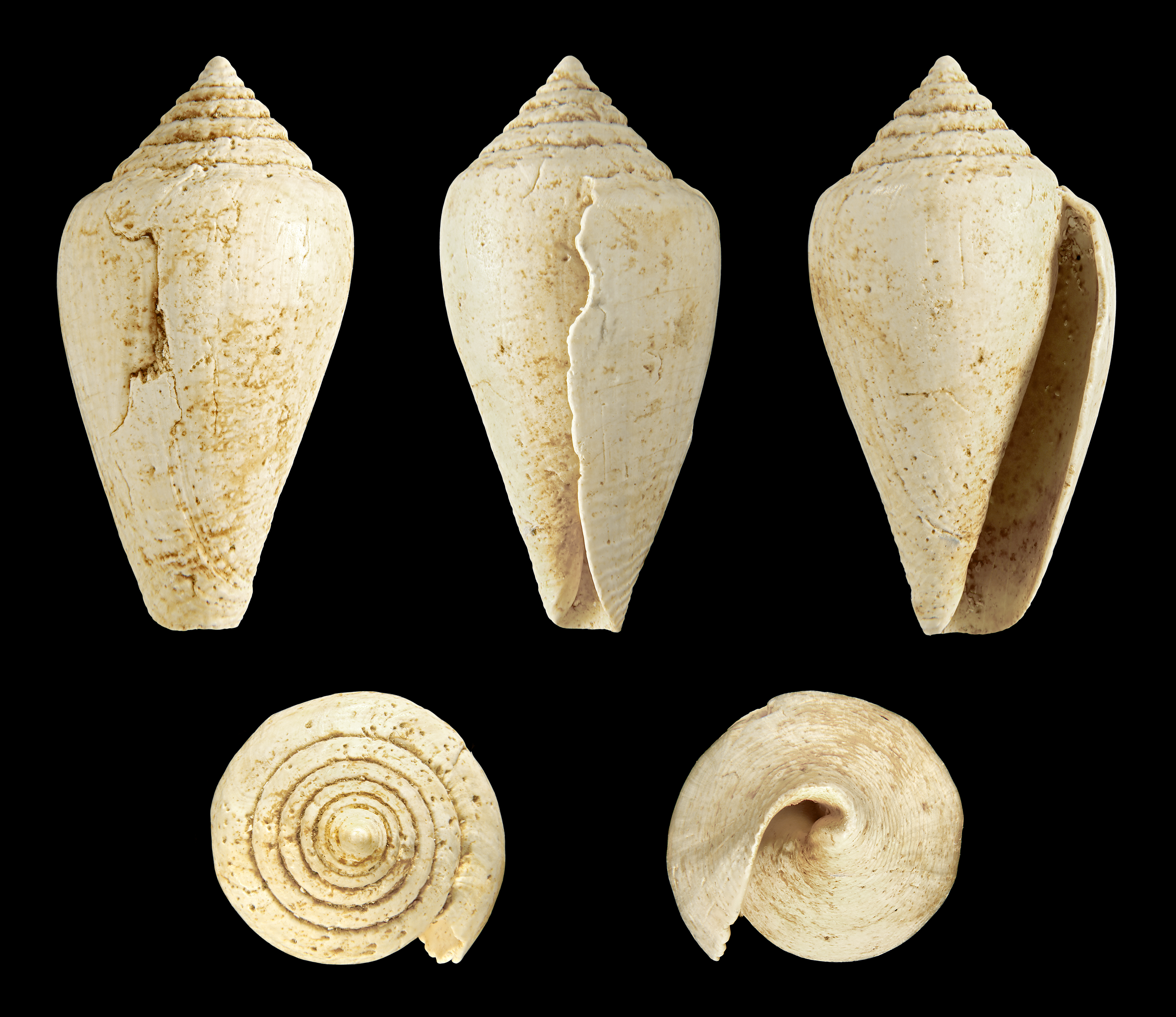
Burdigalian fossils (Leptoconus saucatsensis) named after Saucats

The reserve includes three Cenozoic stages (Neogene, Miocene); Aquitanian (23 to 20.5 Ma); Burdigalian (20.5 to 16.4 Ma); and Serravallian (14.8 to 11.2 Ma).

=== Flora ===
Riparian forests include the common alder, the yellow flag, and the marsh-marigold. The Bernachon site exhibits a large diversity of bryophytes.

=== Fauna ===
The sites are frequented by the European mink, the common genet, the common kingfisher and the grey wagtail. Among the local amphibians, the fire salamander and the marbled newt can be found.

== Touristic and educational interest ==
Apart from the Reserve House, the most important areas of the nature reserve are: the "musées de site" (open-air showcases or amenaged cliffs) of Bernachon and L'Ariey for the Aquitanian stage; Péloua, la Bourasse and Pont-Pourquey (Burdigalian); and Lassime (Serravallian).

== Administration, management plan, regulations ==
The nature reserve gestion is under responsibility of the Association de gestion de la réserve géologique de Saucats et La Brède.

=== Tools and legal status ===
The nature reserve was established under decree of 5 September 1982.
