= John Philpot Curran =

Irish politician and lawyer (1750–1817)

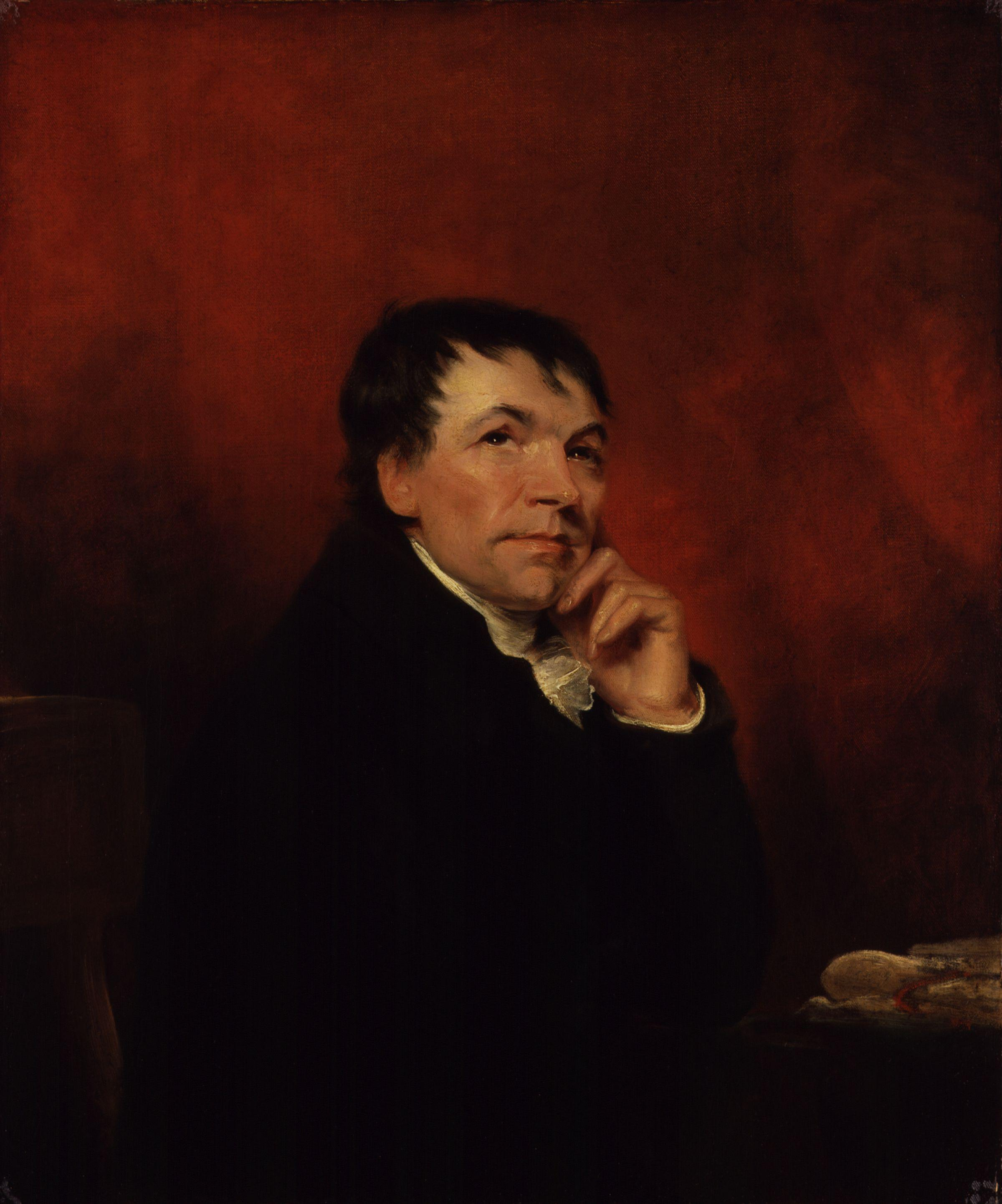

Member of Parliament for Banagher
- In office 1800–1801 Serving with Arthur Dawson
- Preceded by: Edward Hoare; Arthur Dawson
- Succeeded by: Constituency Abolished

Member of Parliament for Rathcormack
- In office 1790–1798 Serving with Henry Duquery

Member of Parliament for Kilbeggan
- In office 1783–1790 Serving with Henry Flood

Personal details
- Born: 24 July 1750 Newmarket, County Cork, Ireland
- Died: 14 October 1817 (aged 67) Brompton, Middlesex, England
- Resting place: Glasnevin Cemetery
- Party: Irish Patriot Party
- Spouse: Sarah Curran (m. 1774; sep. 1795)
- Children: 9, including: Amelia Curran; Sarah Curran
- Relatives: Henry Sturgeon (son-in-law)
- Education: Trinity College Dublin
- Profession: Lawyer

John Philpot Curran (24 July 1750 – 14 October 1817) was an Irish orator, politician, and lawyer celebrated for his defence of civil and political liberty. He first won popular acclaim in 1780, as the only lawyer in his circuit willing to represent a Catholic priest horsewhipped by an Anglo-Irish lord. In the 1790s he was celebrated as a champion in the Irish House of Commons of Catholic emancipation and parliamentary reform, and in court as defence counsel for United Irishmen facing charges of sedition and treason. Following the rebellion of 1798, he was vocal in his opposition to Britain's incorporation of Ireland in a United Kingdom.

Curran's speeches before the judicial bench were widely admired. Lord Byron said of Curran, "I have heard that man speak more poetry than I have seen written". Karl Marx described him as the greatest "people's advocate" of the eighteenth century. Curran appears to be the source of a phrase often attributed to Thomas Jefferson: "eternal vigilance is the price of liberty".

== Early life ==
=== The Curran family ===
Curran was born on 24 July 1750 in Newmarket, County Cork to James Curran, a farmer and seneschal to the manorial court at Newmarket, and Sarah Curran (née Philpot). He grew up alongside tenant children who were "half-starved and miserably housed", a memory that was to foster his "sympathy for the dispossessed".

The Curran family were said to have originally been named Curwen, their ancestor having come from Cumberland as a soldier under Cromwell during the Cromwellian Conquest of Ireland and had originally settled in County Londonderry. Curran's grandfather was from Derry, but settled in Cork. The Philpot family produced Irish judges, lawyers, bishops, priests and noblemen.

=== Education ===
After attending a hedge school, a friend of the family, Rev. Nathaniel Boyse, arranged to have Curran educated at Midleton College, County Cork. Before his entry into Trinity College, he was examined by Rev. Charles Bunworth, who was so impressed by the young Curran that he offered him financial assistance for his studies. He studied law at Trinity College Dublin, where he was described as "the wildest, wittiest, dreamiest student", and continued his legal studies at King's Inns and the Middle Temple in London. During his pupilage, in a pivotal case that confirmed that slavery was illegal in England and Wales (Somerset v Stewart, 1772), he served in the legal team that prevented the west African James Somerset from being deported for sale in Jamaica.

In 1775, Curran was called to the Irish Bar. Upon his first trial, his nerves got the better of him and he couldn't proceed. His short stature, boyish features, shrill voice and a stutter were said to have impacted his career, and earned him the nickname "Stuttering Jack Curran". However, he could speak passionately in court on subjects close to his heart. He eventually overcame his nerves, and got rid of his speech impediment by constantly reciting Shakespeare and Bolingbroke in front of a mirror, and became a noted orator and wit.

=== Duels and early courtroom triumphs ===
His occasional tendency of challenging people to duels (he fought five in all) rather than compromise his values, along with his skilful oratory, quick wit and his championing of popular Irish causes such as Catholic Emancipation and the enlargement of the franchise, made him one of the most popular lawyers in Ireland. He also could speak Irish, still the language of the majority at that time. He wrote a large amount of humorous and romantic poetry.

The case which cemented Curran's popularity was that of Father Neale and St Leger St Leger, 1st Viscount Doneraile at the County Cork Assizes in 1780. Father Neale had condemned from the altar the adulteries of a parishioner who happened be the brother of Lord Doneraile's mistress. In retaliation, Doneraile horse-whipped the elderly priest, evidently secure in the belief that a jury, all Protestant, would never convict him on charges pressed by a Catholic. In cross examination Curran demolished the credibility of Doneraile's witnesses and persuaded the jury to set aside sectarian considerations and award his client 30 guineas. Doneraile challenged Curran to a duel, in which Doneraile fired and missed. Curran declined to fire.

This trial and duel established Curran's reputation. In 1782, after seven years at the bar, he became, with the support of the reform-minded Attorney-General, Barry Yelverton, a king's counsel.

As was remarked of the man who to succeed him as the star of the Irish bar, Daniel O'Connell, in court Curran sought to prevail by refusing deference, showing no compunction in studying and exploiting a prosecutor's or judge's personal and intellectual weaknesses. This was often an occasion for his celebrated witticisms. A prosecutor, infuriated by Curran's insults, threatened to put him in his pocket. "If you do that," replied Curran, "you will have more law in your pocket than you ever had in your head." On another occasion, contending that Curran was splitting hairs, John Fitzgibbon, 1st Earl of Clare, objected that the words "also" and "likewise" have exactly the same meaning? "Hardly, my Lord". Curran replied. "I remember when the great Lord Lifford presided over this Court. You also preside here, but you certainly do not preside likewise".

=== Marriage and family ===
In 1774, Curran married Sarah Curran (née Creagh; 1755–1844), the daughter of the physician Richard Creagh. The couple had 9 children, including the painter Amelia, and Sarah Curran, a musician, poet and composer. The family moved to The Priory in Rathfarnham in 1790, where Curran's favorite daughter Gertrude died in 1792 after falling out a window. Gertrude was buried in the grounds of the house and Curran spend hours watching her grave from his window while withdrawing affection from his wife and the other children.

In 1795, Curran forced his wife, pregnant following an affair with The Rev Michael Sandys, out of the family home and forbade her from contacting their children. (Note: Also cited as 1794.) Curran brought legal proceedings against Sandys for having a "criminal conversation" with his wife, in which his own series of affairs were brought into the public spotlight. Curran was awarded £50 in damages, and later stated that his marriage was the worst mistake he had ever made in his life.

== Parliamentary advocate of emancipation and reform ==
Curran stood as Member of Parliament (MP) for Kilbeggan in 1783. He subsequently represented Rathcormack between 1790 and 1798 and served then for Banagher from 1800 until the Act of Union in 1801.

Curran entered the Irish House of Commons in the immediate wake of the "Revolution of 1782". With its forces stripped from Ireland to serve in the American War, the British Government had been sufficiently intimidated by the Irish Volunteer movement to surrender the right of the British Parliament to legislate for Ireland. In his first major speech in the Irish House of Commons, Curran supported Henry Flood's attempt to build on the Volunteer success in securing legislative independence with parliamentary reform. Flood proposed to abolish the "pocket boroughs" that allowed the aristocracy, already seated in the Lords, to nominate and control two-thirds of the Irish Commons. When the Ascendancy lords, confident of the return from America of a British garrison and appreciative of liberally-dispensed Government favours, affirmed their confidence in the existing "Constitution", Curran was persuaded of the need to look to the Kingdom's wholly disenfranchised Catholic majority.

Speaking on the tenth anniversary of 1782, Curran credited the achievement of legislative independence to a "partial union" between Protestants and their Catholic "fellow countrymen". The Patriots accepted the support of Catholics, but with neither "the justice or gratitude to let them share the fruits of the victory", had allowed them to "relapse into their former insignificance and depression". The result was an Irish Parliament as much "at the feet of the British Minister" as it had been when formally subordinate to Westminster.

This was the essence of Wolfe Tone's Argument on behalf of the Catholics of Ireland (1791): without the complete emancipation that would allow Catholics to act in a true union with Protestants, the Ascendancy would continue to misrepresent Ireland and subordinate her interests to those of England. It was a question, Curran insisted, not merely of Catholic "sufferings or their relief":

[A] partial liberty cannot long subsist ... alienation of 3 millions of our people, subserviency and corruption in a fourth ... [T]he inevitable consequence would be a Union with Great Britain. And if anyone desires to know what that would be, I will tell him. It would be the emigration of every man of consequence from Ireland; it would be the participation of British taxes, without British trade; it would be the extinction of the Irish name as a people.

Identified with the patriot Whig opposition of Henry Grattan, a personal friend, Curran pressed the case for Catholic Emancipation. After the extension (under pressure from London) of the limited right to vote in 1795, this focussed on removing the sacramental bar to Catholics sitting in Parliament and taking public office. At war with Republican France, and satisfied that it had done enough to secure the loyalty of wealthier Catholics and their bishops, the Government suppressed further agitation. In February 1796, Curran protested the Insurrection Bill, which empowered magistrates to order transportation, as "a Bill for the rich, and against the poor."

What is a Bill which puts the liberty of the poor man, who has no visible means of living but labour, in the discretion of the magistrates? In Ireland, where poverty [is] general, it constitutes poverty [as] a crime. Let the rich men of Ireland, therefore, fear when they enact a law against poverty, lest poverty should enact a counter-law against riches.

In October 1796, Curran supported Grattan's motion, in face an anticipated French invasion, that a defence of the kingdom could best be secured by legislation to guarantee "the blessings and privileges of the constitution without distinction of religion". On 15 May 1797, he supported William Ponsonby's proposal for sweeping reform. Once this last effort of the constitutional opposition to obtain a conciliatory policy from the government was rejected, Curran and his colleagues withdrew from the Commons and ceased to attend its debates until the parliament adjourned on 3 July.

== Courtroom defence of United Irishmen ==
Despairing at the intransigence of the government, and in the hope of assistance from France, Wolfe Tone's United Irishmen organised to secure a national government by force of arms. Despite threats to his person (Loyalists denounced him as "the leading advocate of every murderer, ruffian and low villain"), when their leading publicists and conspirators were brought up on charges Curran served as star counsel. As his assisting junior counsel he took the United Irishman William Sampson.

Curran's courtroom performances were widely reported and admired but, in many of the more celebrated cases, failed to secure acquittals. The Rev. William Jackson, accused of being an agent of the French Directory, cheated the hangman by taking his own life. Wolfe Tone and Archibald Hamilton Rowan, who had conferred with Jackson, escaped (or were permitted to escape) into exile. Napper Tandy, similarly fled. William Orr was hanged for administering the United Irish test to a soldier. The Sheares Brothers, and William Byrne, at the height of the Rebellion in July 1798, were hanged, drawn and quartered。

In Ireland, the government could secure a conviction of treason on the testimony of just one witness. Where Curran succeeded, he relied on lengthy cross-examination of such government witnesses (often paid informers), seeking to trap them in inconsistencies. He used this technique to great effect in the case in 1797 of eleven members of the congregation of the Rev. Thomas Ledlie Birch, Saintfield, County Down, charged with attacking the house of a loyalist informer. His cross-examination of the prosecution witness the Presbyterian-turned-Anglican Revd. John Cleland, sub-sheriff and land agent of the Lord Londonderry, was "withering" and all were acquitted.

There was some disquiet over Curran's representation of Peter Finnerty, charged for seditious libel in publishing an attack on the judges in the trial of William Orr and on the Lord Lieutenant of Ireland, who had refused to grant Orr a reprieve. In a speech that "he himself preferred to any of his other speeches", he defended the liberty of the press as "twined with the liberty of the people": its duty to "speak truth to the king in the hearing of the people, and to the people in the hearing of king". His critics, however, suggested that his purpose was less to acquit Finnerty than to again contest what he contended was the charge that had sent Orr to the gallows, "abjuring that bigotry that had torn and disgraced his country", and in maximising the embarrassment of the government. Finnerty was sentenced to a session in the pillory and two years in prison.

In 1802, Curran won damages from Major Henry Sirr, who in 1798 had fired the fatal shot in the arrest of Lord Edward FitzGerald. Curran represented a proven loyalist who had collapsed a treason trial by convincing a jury of the "infamous" character of Sirr's key witness. Sirr and his colleague were alleged then to have used wrongful arrest, imprisonment incommunicado, and condemnation to hanging as means of extortion and personal satisfaction. Curran used the occasion to underscore that these were the same illegitimate methods used to suppress the United movement. Niles' Register of 24 March 1821 was to describe Sirr as "this old sinner, given to eternal infamy by the eloquence of Curran'".

It was rumoured that had the rebels succeeded in 1798, they would have nominated Curran to a governing committee of one hundred.

== Response to Emmet's Rebellion ==
Curran was bitterly disappointed by the Act of Union of 1800 that abolished the Irish Parliament in favour of representation at Westminster, and which he had anticipated would be the result of failure to reform. Under the Union, he declared, "The instruments of our government have been almost simplified into the tax gatherer and the hangman, . . . and our persons are disposed of by laws made in another clime".

Although in its wake his house was searched and he was brought before the Privy Council to answer inquiries, Curran had no truck with the attempt by Robert Emmet in July 1803 to mount a new insurrection in Dublin. That, in the course of the hapless rising, the rebels murdered his friend Lord Kilwarden confirmed Curran in his rejection of physical-force republicanism. Nonetheless, he had been prepared to defend Emmet until interrogators revealed that his daughter Sarah had continued in a romantic relationship with the defendant. Curran (who had already experienced his wife's elopement), was scandalised. He also had reason to fear his family ruin as the possibility of incriminating correspondence gave Major Sirr the pretext to raid the family home. Curran disowned Sarah, who later married in England where, following the death of her new born son, she died in 1808. Despite his daughter's wish to be buried alongside her sister Gertrude at Rathfarnham, Curran refused and she was buried at Newmarket.

Curran did appear on 1 September 1803 for several of the nineteen persons who were tried for complicity with Emmet in the rising, though he spoke only on behalf of the tailor, Owen Kirwan. Representing Kirwan, Curran, recently returned from a visit to France, derided the rebel's trust in French intentions. Napoleon, he said, would have rewarded "his rapacious generals and soldiers by parcelling out the soil of the island among them, and by dividing you into lots of serfs to till the respective lands to which they belonged". Kirwan, like Emmet who at his trial offered no defence, was hanged on 3 September.

== Bitterness of his final years ==
Curran was appointed Master of the Rolls in Ireland, in 1806, following Pitt's replacement by a more liberal cabinet. It was a highly remunerative office in the Irish Chancery, subsequently offered to, and refused, by Daniel O'Connell.

In 1812, friends persuaded Curran to stand for Newry as the parliamentary candidate for Catholic emancipation and reform. There was popular enthusiasm: days before the election, his approaching carriage was reportedly greeted 2 miles from the town by a crowd of 3,000. But among the few hundred registered voters, the sitting Tory MP, General Francis Needham, prevailed. Accepting defeat, Curran declared "under circumstances like the present, under such rulers and in such a state of popular representation, or rather misrepresentation, I am perfectly convinced that no force of any individual, or even of many joined together, could do much to serve us, or save us".

In 1814, he retired and moved to London where he enjoyed the society of Thomas Erskine (his English counterpart in the defence of radicals and reformers), John Horne Took, Richard Brinsley Sheridan, the Prince Regent, William Godwin and (notwithstanding his sympathies, expressed in verse, for Curran's estranged daughter Sarah)Thomas Moore. But his latter days were embittered both by domestic troubles and by political disappointment and despair:

Everything I see disgusts and depresses me: I look back at the streaming of blood for so many years, and everything everywhere relapse into its former degradation--France rechained, Spain again saddled for the priests, and Ireland, like a bastinadoed elephant, kneeling to receive the paltry rider.

In the summer of 1817, he was seized by paralysis while dining at the table of Thomas Moore. He died on 14 October 1817, aged 67. A few days before his death, at the mention of Irish politics he had hung his head and burst into tears.

== Eulogies and commemoration ==
In 1837, Curran's remains were transferred from Paddington Cemetery, London to Glasnevin Cemetery, where they were laid in an 8-foot-high classical-style sarcophagus. In 1845 a white marble memorial to him, with a carved bust by Christopher Moore, was placed near the west door of St Patrick's Cathedral, Dublin.

Sir Jonah Barrington (infamous for his removal from the judiciary by parliamentary petition to the King in 1830) recalled, from an "intimacy" that was "long and close", that:

Curran's person was mean and decrepit; very slight, very shapeless--with nothing of the gentleman about it; on the contrary, displaying spindle limbs, a shambling gait, one hand imperfect, and a face yellow, furrowed, rather flat and thoroughly ordinary. Yet his features were the very reverse of disagreeable; there was something so indescribably dramatic in the eye and the play of his eyebrow, that his visage seemed the index of his mind, and his humour the slave of his will. ... [H]is rapid movements, his fire, his sparkling eye, and fine and varied intonations of his voice, these conspired to give life and energy to every company he mixed with.

Lord Byron said, after the death of Curran, "I have heard that man speak more poetry than I have seen written", and, in a letter to Thomas Moore, 1 October 1821, "I feel, as your poor Curran said, before his death, 'a mountain of lead upon my heart, which I believe to be constitutional, and that nothing will remove it but the same remedy'". An engraved portrait of Curran by J.J. Wedgwood was published in volume one of the first Irish biographical dictionary, Biographia Hibernica, a Biographical Dictionary of the Worthies of Ireland, from the earliest periods to the present time, (London, 1819: Richard Ryan (biographer)).

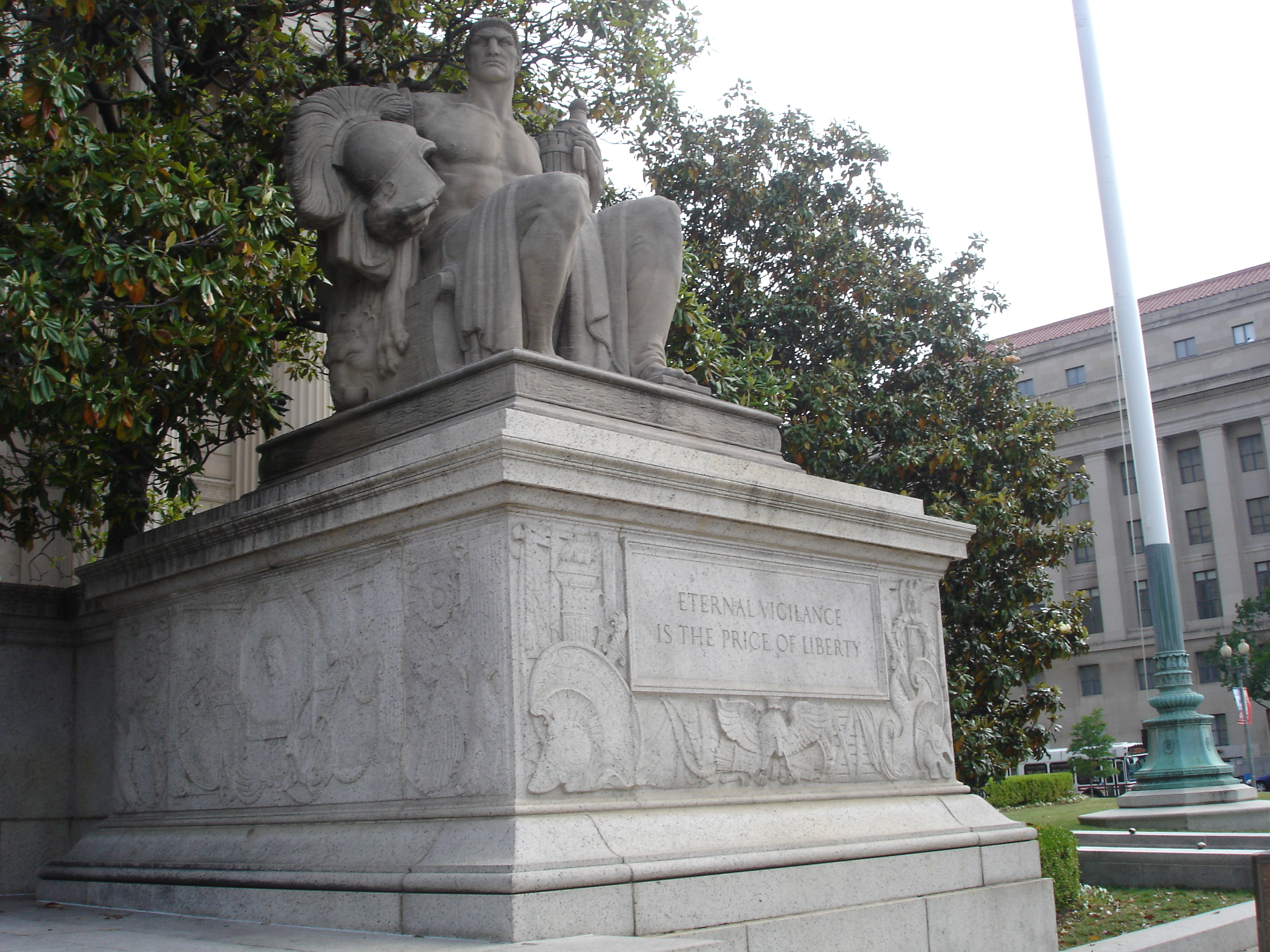
"Eternal Vigilance is the Price of Liberty" inscribed on a monument in Washington D.C.. Although there is no record of his employing the phrase, the words are often attributed to Thomas Jefferson. In the early nineteenth century, American newspapers credited various versions to Curran. In 1790, in a speech regarding the election of the Lord Mayor of London, Curran had proposed that "The condition upon which God hath given liberty to man is eternal vigilance.".

In Fisher's Drawing Room Scrap Book, 1832, Letitia Elizabeth Landon includes an illustrative poem to the engraved portrait therein, this being by Sir Thomas Lawrence. She describes Curran as being 'Gifted with all the mighty strength of words'.

The Young Irelander, Thomas Davis, edited a collection of Curran's bar, and parliamentary speeches (1847). In recommending these to Friedrich Engels ("You will find quoted there all the sources for the United Irishmen"), Karl Marx accounted Curran "the only great lawyer (people's advocate) of the eighteenth century and the noblest personality". Henry Grattan, by comparison, was a mere "parliamentary rogue".

American abolitionists, among them Harriet Beecher Stowe in Uncle Tom's Cabin (Chapter 37), and, on his speaking tours, Frederick Douglass, continued to cite Curran's early speech in defence of an African man, James Somersett, plaintiff in a court case that confirmed slavery to be illegal in England and Wales.

No matter with what solemnities he may have been devoted on the altar of slavery, the moment he touches the sacred soil of Britain, the altar and the god sink together in the dust; his soul walks abroad in her own majesty; his body swells beyond the measure of his chains which burst from around him, and he stands redeemed, regenerated, and disenthralled, by the irresistible genius of universal emancipation.

Robert G. Ingersoll, the American lawyer and, as a popular speaker, "the Great Agnostic" of the Golden Age of Free Thought, considered Curran "a greater orator than Chatham, Fox or Burke."

== Notes ==
Parliament of Ireland
Preceded by Sir Richard Johnston, 1st Bt; Charles Lambart	Member of Parliament for Kilbeggan; 1783–1790; With: Henry Flood	Succeeded by Thomas Burgh; William Sherlock
Preceded by Charles Francis Sheridan; Thomas Orde	Member of Parliament for Rathcormack; 1790–1798; With: Henry Duquerry	Succeeded by Charles McDonnell; Henry Boyle, Viscount Boyle
Preceded by Edward Hoare; Arthur Dawson	Member of Parliament for Banagher; 1800 – 1801; With: Arthur Dawson	Succeeded by Parliament of the United Kingdom
Legal offices
Preceded by Michael Smith	Master of the Rolls in Ireland; 1806–1814	Succeeded by William MacMahon
