= Amelia Curran =

Amelia Curran may refer to:

- Amelia Curran (painter), Irish painter
- Amelia Curran (musician), Canadian singer-songwriter
