= Villenave-près-Marsac =

- Commune
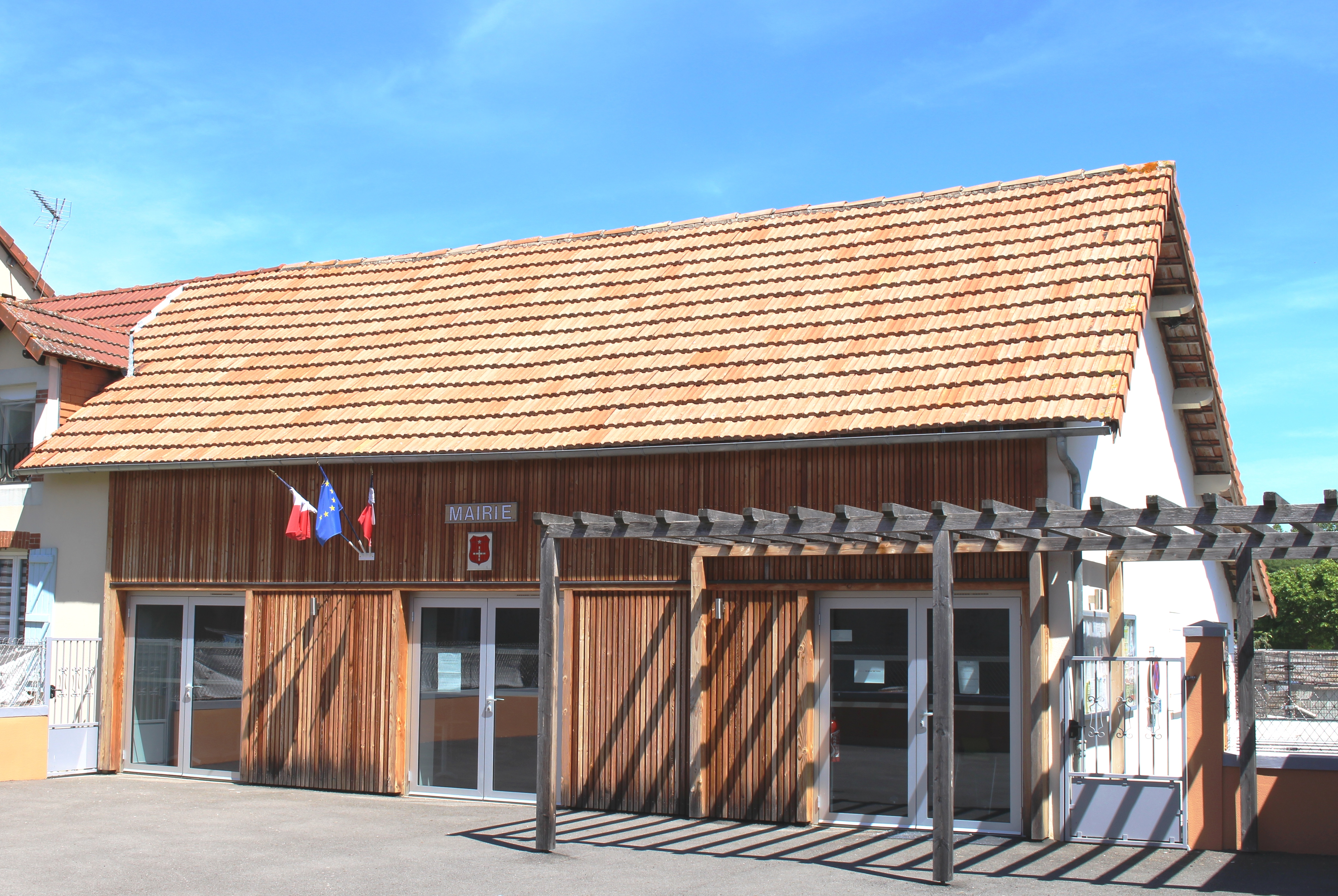
- Town hall

- Coat of arms
- Location of Villenave-près-Marsac
- Location within France Location within Occitanie
- Coordinates: 43°20′04″N 0°05′23″E
- Country: France
- Region: Occitania
- Department: Hautes-Pyrénées
- Arrondissement: Tarbes
- Canton: Vic-en-Bigorre

Government
  - Mayor (2020–2026): Thérèse Peycere
- Area^{1}: 1.12 km^{2} (0.43 sq mi)
- Elevation: 239 m (784 ft)
- Highest elevation: 245 m (804 ft)
- Lowest elevation: 235 m (771 ft)
- Population (2023): 110
  - Density: 98/km^{2} (250/sq mi)
- Time zone: UTC+01:00 (CET)
  - Summer (DST): UTC+02:00 (CEST)
- INSEE/Postal code: 65477 /65500
- ^{1} French Land Register data, which excludes lakes, ponds, glaciers > 1 km^{2} (0.386 sq mi or 247 acres) and river estuaries.

Villenave-près-Marsac (French pronunciation: [vilnav pʁɛ maʁsak], literally Villenave near Marsac; Occitan: Vilanava) is a commune in the Hautes-Pyrénées department in south-western France.

== See also ==
- Communes of the Hautes-Pyrénées department
