= Gayan =

Gayan may refer to:

- Gayan District, a district in Paktika Province, Afghanistan
- Gayan, Hautes-Pyrénées, at commune in the Hautes-Pyrénées department, France
