= Daguin =

Daguin is a surname. Notable people with the surname include:

- André Daguin (1935–2019), French chef
- Ariane Daguin, French-American businesswoman
- Sophie Daguin (1801–1881), French ballet dancer and choreographer
- Victor Daguin (born 2000), French footballer
