= Sarniguet =

- Commune
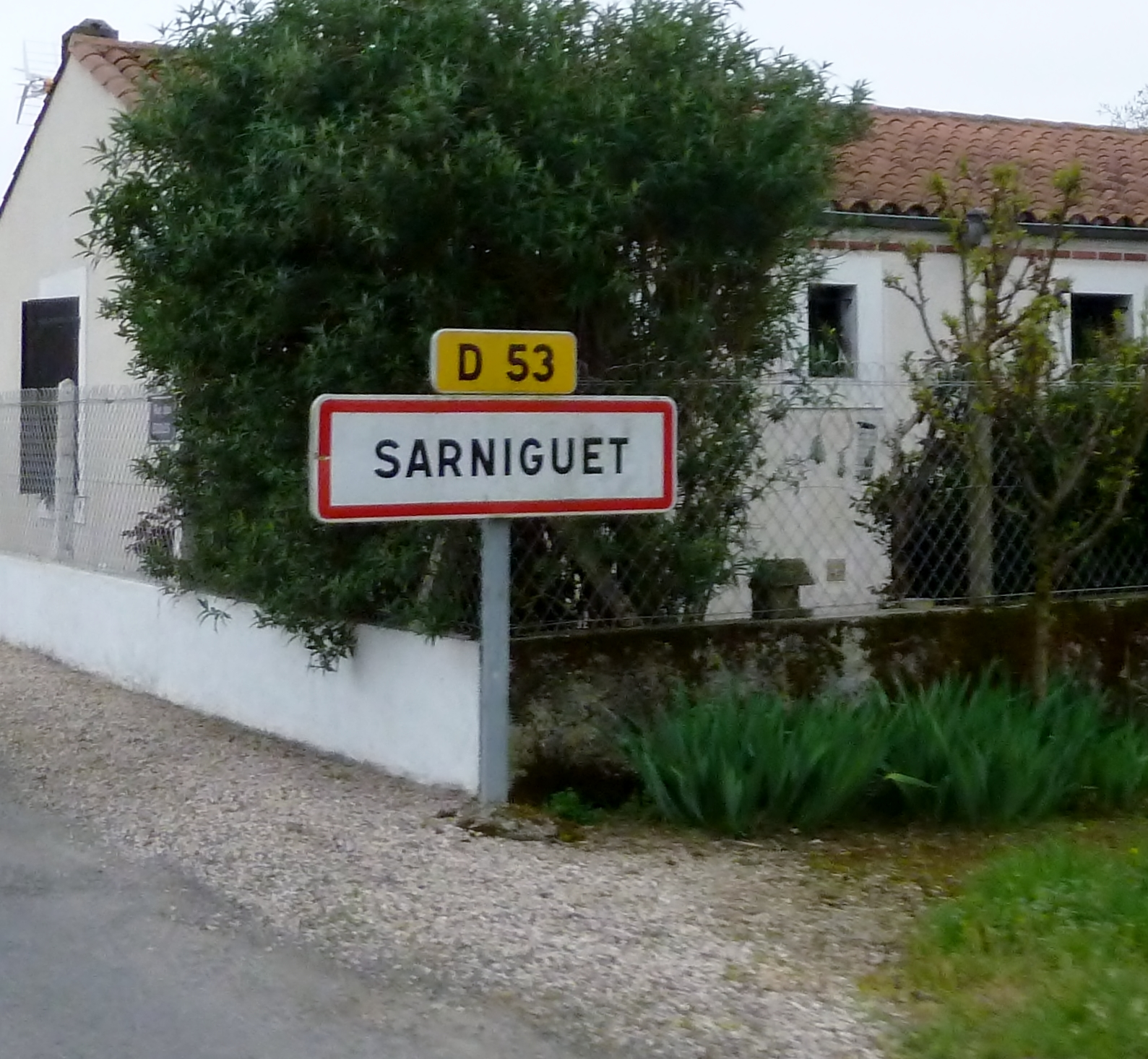
- The road into Sarniguet

- Coat of arms
- Location of Sarniguet
- Location within France Location within Occitanie
- Coordinates: 43°19′07″N 0°05′19″E
- Country: France
- Region: Occitania
- Department: Hautes-Pyrénées
- Arrondissement: Tarbes
- Canton: Vic-en-Bigorre
- Intercommunality: CA Tarbes-Lourdes-Pyrénées

Government
  - Mayor (2020–2026): René Lapeyre
- Area^{1}: 2.07 km^{2} (0.80 sq mi)
- Elevation: 252 m (827 ft)
- Highest elevation: 257 m (843 ft)
- Lowest elevation: 248 m (814 ft)
- Population (2023): 260
  - Density: 130/km^{2} (330/sq mi)
- Time zone: UTC+01:00 (CET)
  - Summer (DST): UTC+02:00 (CEST)
- INSEE/Postal code: 65406 /65390
- ^{1} French Land Register data, which excludes lakes, ponds, glaciers > 1 km^{2} (0.386 sq mi or 247 acres) and river estuaries.

Sarniguet (French pronunciation: [saʁniɡɛ]) is a commune in the Hautes-Pyrénées department in southwestern France.

== Geography ==
Sarniguet is located on the left bank of the Adour River, which flows at highly variable rates through the vast and fertile plain of the same name. The commune of Sarniguet is 207 hectares (510 acres) in area and 11 km (6.8 mi) distant from the department capital, Tarbes. The patchwork terrain of Sarniguet consists heavily of plains surrounded by forested borders of alder and Italian poplar.

== See also ==
- Communes of the Hautes-Pyrénées department
