= Tarasteix =

- Commune
- Coat of arms
- Location of Tarasteix
- Location within France Location within Occitanie
- Coordinates: 43°19′17″N 0°00′23″W
- Country: France
- Region: Occitania
- Department: Hautes-Pyrénées
- Arrondissement: Tarbes
- Canton: Vic-en-Bigorre

Government
  - Mayor (2023–2026): Alain Conte-Daban
- Area^{1}: 9.85 km^{2} (3.80 sq mi)
- Elevation: 430 m (1,410 ft)
- Highest elevation: 366 m (1,201 ft)
- Lowest elevation: 258 m (846 ft)
- Population (2023): 267
  - Density: 27.1/km^{2} (70.2/sq mi)
- Time zone: UTC+01:00 (CET)
  - Summer (DST): UTC+02:00 (CEST)
- INSEE/Postal code: 65439 /65320
- ^{1} French Land Register data, which excludes lakes, ponds, glaciers > 1 km^{2} (0.386 sq mi or 247 acres) and river estuaries.

Tarasteix (French pronunciation: [taʁastɛks]; Occitan: Tarastèish) is a commune in the Hautes-Pyrénées department in south-western France.

== See also ==
- Communes of the Hautes-Pyrénées department
