= Aurensan, Hautes-Pyrénées =

Aurensan
- Commune
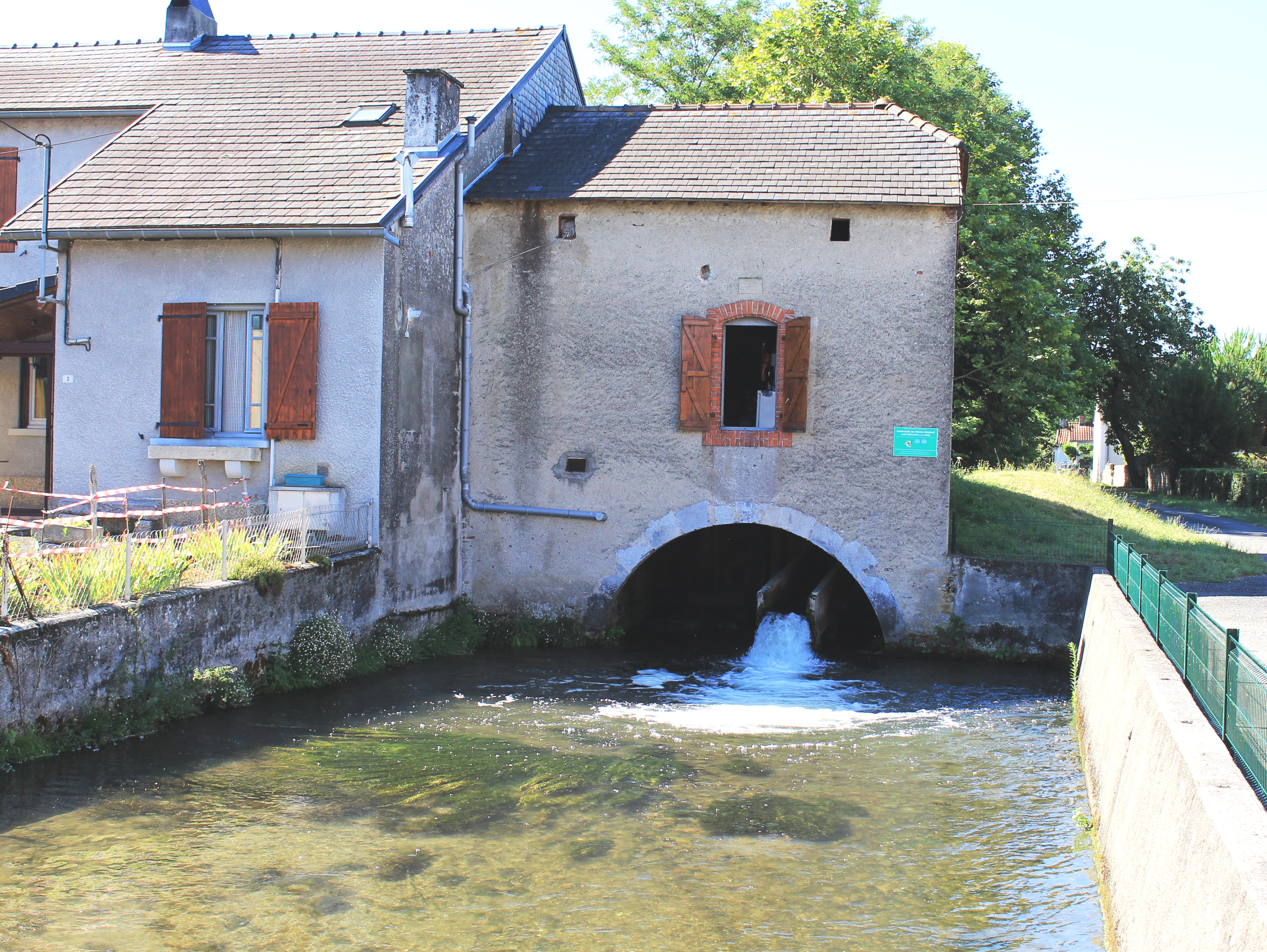
- View of the Moulin d 'Aurensan

- Coat of arms
- Location of Aurensan
- Location within France Location within Occitanie
- Coordinates: 43°18′23″N 0°05′17″E
- Country: France
- Region: Occitania
- Department: Hautes-Pyrénées
- Arrondissement: Tarbes
- Canton: Vic-en-Bigorre
- Intercommunality: CA Tarbes-Lourdes-Pyrénées

Government
  - Mayor (2020–2026): Jean-François Lapeyre
- Area^{1}: 7.11 km^{2} (2.75 sq mi)
- Elevation: 260 m (850 ft)
- Highest elevation: 271 m (889 ft)
- Lowest elevation: 250 m (820 ft)
- Population (2023): 764
  - Density: 107/km^{2} (278/sq mi)
- Time zone: UTC+01:00 (CET)
  - Summer (DST): UTC+02:00 (CEST)
- INSEE/Postal code: 65048 /65390
- ^{1} French Land Register data, which excludes lakes, ponds, glaciers > 1 km^{2} (0.386 sq mi or 247 acres) and river estuaries.

Aurensan (French pronunciation: [oʁɛ̃sɑ̃]) is a commune in the Hautes-Pyrénées department in southwestern France.

== Population ==
Historical population
Year	Pop.	±% p.a.
1968	415	—
1975	502	+2.76%
1982	567	+1.75%
1990	592	+0.54%
1999	660	+1.22%
2007	733	+1.32%
2012	768	+0.94%
2017	789	+0.54%
2023	764	−0.54%
Source: INSEE

== See also ==
- Communes of the Hautes-Pyrénées department
