= Peyrot =

Peyrot is a surname. Notable people with the surname include:

- Arturo Peyrot (1908–1993), Italian artist
- Lara Peyrot (born 1975), Italian cross-country skier
- Nadia Peyrot (born 1972), Italian archery biathlete

== See also ==
- Peiròt
