= Amelia Curran (painter) =

Irish artist (1775–1847)

- Born: 1775; Dublin or Cork, Ireland
- Died: 1847 (aged 71–72); Rome, Kingdom of Italy
- Father: John Philpot Curran
- Relatives: Sarah Curran (sister); Henry Sturgeon (brother-in-law)

Amelia Curran (1775 – 1847) was an Irish painter active in Dublin and Rome, known for her friendship with Percy and Mary Shelley.

== Early life ==
Curran was born in 1775 in either Dublin or Cork to John Philpot Curran, a politician and lawyer, and Sarah Curran (née Creagh). The eldest of nine siblings, Curran was the elder sister of the musician, poet and composer Sarah Curran. During her early childhood the family moved between Dublin, where her father practised as a barrister, and Priory Glen, County Cork, where her maternal grandfather worked as a physician. The family moved to The Priory in Rathfarnham in 1790, where Curran's sister Gertrude died in 1792 after falling out a window.

Gertrude (her father's favorite daughter) was buried in the grounds of the house and Curran's father spend hours watching her grave from his window; he also withdraw affection from his other children and her parent's marriage deteriorated. In 1795, Curran's father threw her mother, pregnant following an affair with The Rev Michael Sandys, out of the family home and forbade her from contacting their children; Curran took over the running of the family home. Her father brought legal proceedings against Sandys for having a "criminal conversation" with his wife, in which his own series of affairs were brought into the public spotlight.

== Career ==
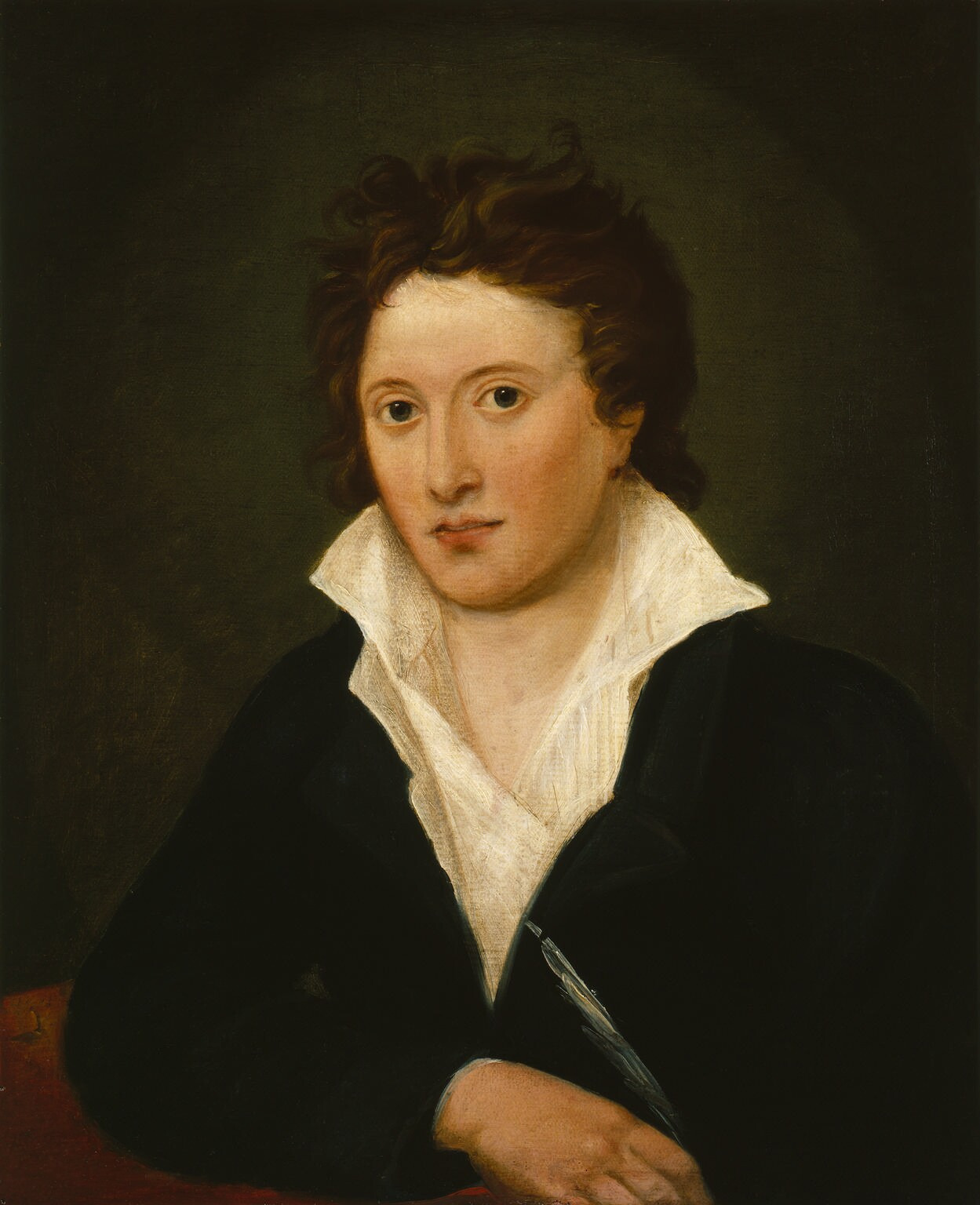
Portrait of Percy Bysshe Shelley by Amelia Curran (1819)

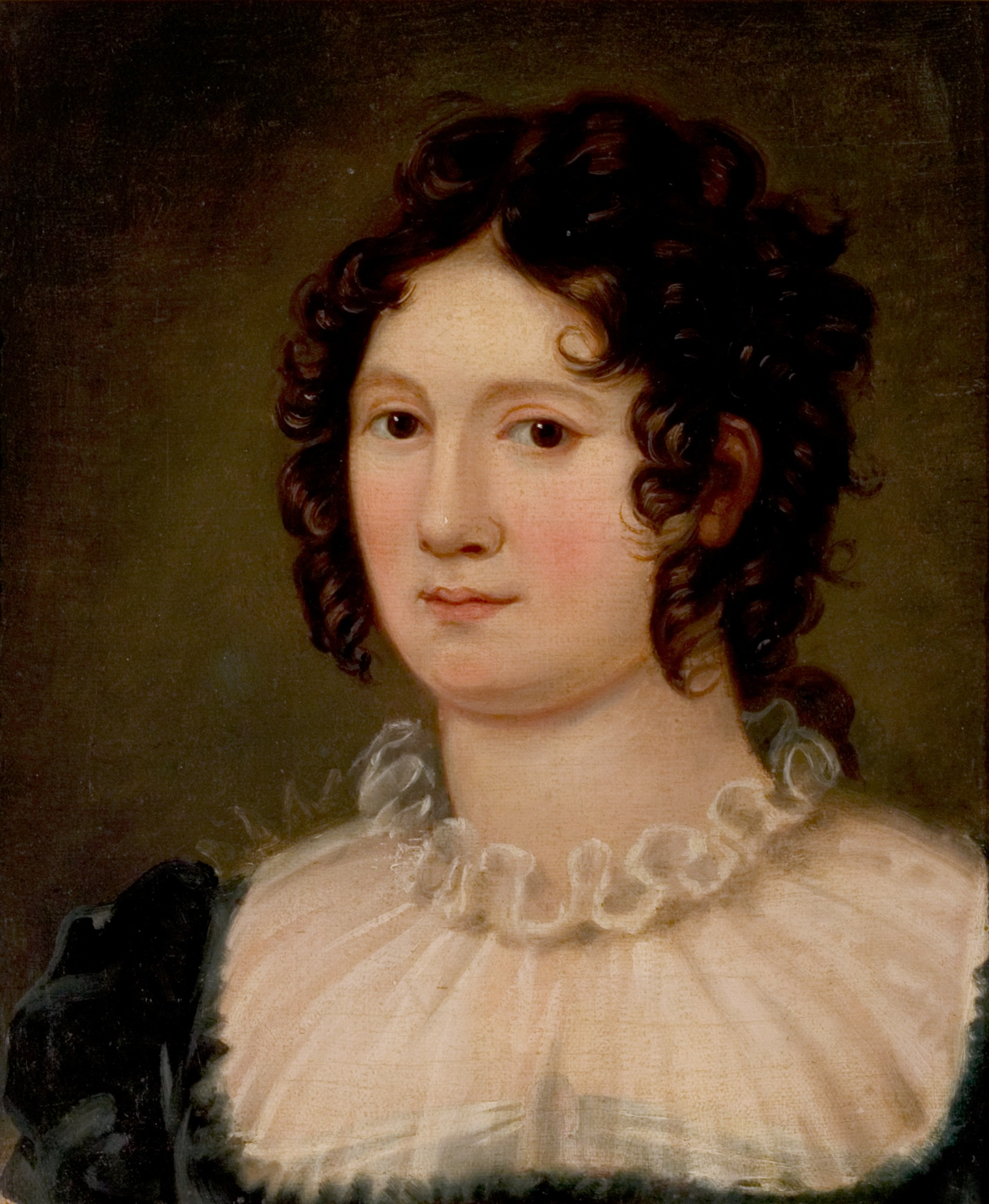
Portrait of Claire Clairmont, by Amelia Curran

In 1810, through her father, she met novelist William Godwin and Aaron Burr, the American politician. Soon after, she met her lifelong friend, Percy Bysshe Shelley. In 1812 Percy Shelley traveled to Ireland to campaign against the injustices done there under British rule and was introduced to her father. Curran also painted a portrait of Shelley's three-and-a-half-year-old son William (called "Willmouse") in Rome, just before Willmouse's death from malaria in 1819.

She later traveled to Rome and built up a close friendship and correspondence with Shelley's second wife Mary Shelley. In 1821, Curran moved to Naples, where she converted to Catholicism. Moving to Paris the next year, it was falsely rumoured that she had married and separated from a man. Curran returned to Rome in 1824 to spend the rest of her life.

Curran painted Percy Shelley several times. These are among the few paintings of Shelley painted in his lifetime, and the only ones of him in his adulthood which was copied by several artists including Alfred Clint and William Holl among others. They are noted for their androgynous features, and their striking similarity to Guido Reni's painting of Beatrice Cenci, which was one of the poet's favorite pictures. Curran's 1819 portrait of Shelley was included in the 1905 book Women Painters of the World and hangs at the National Portrait Gallery in London.

Curran also painted a portrait of Claire Clairmont and made copies of several Renaissance Madonnas. During the same spring of 1819 when painting William Shelley, Curran received Percy and Mary Shelley for individual portraits along with Clairmont. Curran had known Mary and Claire since childhood, when she had accompanied her father on visits to their father and step-father, William Godwin, in London.

== Personal life ==
On 30 August 1847, Curran died in Rome. She was cremated and buried at the Sant'Isidoro a Capo le Case; the future Cardinal Newman presided at her funeral Mass. A memorial plaque for her was later commissioned by Valentine Lawless, 2nd Baron Cloncurry, which was subsequently placed in the church.

== Bibliography ==
- Bieri, James; Shelley, Percy Bysshe (2008). Percy Bysshe Shelley: a biography. Baltimore: Johns Hopkins University Press. p. 196. ISBN 9780801888601. OCLC 487612237.
- Polack, Fiona (2011). "Amelia Curran's Newfoundland Painting". Keats-Shelley Journal. 60: 25–29. ISSN 0453-4387. JSTOR 41409553.
- Sunstein, Emily W (1989). Mary Shelley: romance and reality. Boston, Mass.; Toronto; London: Little, Brown. p. 58. ISBN 9780316822466. OCLC 463438395.
