= Pintac =

- Commune
- Coat of arms
- Location of Pintac
- Location within France Location within Occitanie
- Coordinates: 43°17′09″N 0°00′28″W
- Country: France
- Region: Occitania
- Department: Hautes-Pyrénées
- Arrondissement: Tarbes
- Canton: Vic-en-Bigorre

Government
  - Mayor (2020–2026): Francis Pédaugé
- Area^{1}: 1.49 km^{2} (0.58 sq mi)
- Elevation: 370 m (1,210 ft)
- Highest elevation: 377 m (1,237 ft)
- Lowest elevation: 290 m (950 ft)
- Population (2023): 22
  - Density: 15/km^{2} (38/sq mi)
- Time zone: UTC+01:00 (CET)
  - Summer (DST): UTC+02:00 (CEST)
- INSEE/Postal code: 65364 /65320
- ^{1} French Land Register data, which excludes lakes, ponds, glaciers > 1 km^{2} (0.386 sq mi or 247 acres) and river estuaries.

Pintac (French pronunciation: [pɛ̃tak]) is a commune in the Hautes-Pyrénées department in south-western France.

== See also ==
- Communes of the Hautes-Pyrénées department
