= Ariane Daguin =

Female CEO and chef

- Born: March 12, 1958 (age 68)
- Occupations: Business owner, author, philanthropist, and investor
- Known for: D'Artagnan
- Father: André Daguin

Ariane Daguin is a French-American business owner, author, culinary celebrity and educator. Born in Auch, in the Gascony region of France, she was the first child of parents Jocelyne and Michelin-starred chef André Daguin. She is the co-founder of the American gourmet meat distributor, D'Artagnan where she was CEO until 2022. She remains active as a consultant. She also co-founded the non-profit farm foundation All For One One For All (AOOA) Farm in 2021, which includes a distillery and café open to the public. In addition to her culinary and business ventures, she is also a philanthropist and investor in several food startups.

== Biography ==
In 1978, Ariane moved to the United States to pursue an academic degree at Columbia University. While studying in New York City, she worked part-time for a local pâté producer, an experience that set the foundation for her future endeavors. In 1985, she seized an opportunity to market duck and foie gras from the Catskills, leading to the launch of D’Artagnan, a company dedicated to premium meats, game, and gourmet products.

In 2021, she and her daughter, Alix Daguin (born 1988), co-founded All For One One For All (AOOA) Farm, a regenerative silvopasture farm and education center in New York’s Hudson Valley. Inspired by Alexandre Dumas’ Three Musketeers, AOOA Farm promotes responsible agriculture, community well-being, and environmental sustainability. The farm also features a distillery and café open to the public.

Ariane’s contributions to the food industry have earned her the James Beard Foundation Award for “Who’s Who of Food and Beverage in America”, Bon Appétit’s Lifetime Achievement Award, and France’s prestigious Legion d’Honneur. She is also a board member of City Harvest and the founding president of Les Nouvelles Mères Cuisinières, an international association of women chefs.

Ariane has appeared on programs such as Anthony Bourdain’s No Reservations, Beat Bobby Flay, and Martha Stewart Living. Bourdain, a longtime admirer of her work, even named his only daughter after her. She is also the author of D’Artagnan’s Glorious Game Cookbook and her autobiography, D’Artagnan à New York (Grasset).

=== Early professional career ===
Daguin started out supplying meat and poultry via D'Artagnan to chefs, such as Daniel Boulud, David Burke, Patrick Clark (the first black chef to win a James Beard Award), and Jean-Louis Palladin.

The company was the first in America to distribute fresh foie gras. The company was one the first to commercialise organic chicken in the US, even though the USDA hadn't yet defined organic.

=== Later professional career ===
==== D'Artagnan ====
In August 2005, Daguin bought out her co-founder. The company then started growing rapidly, reaching record sales of $50 million in 2008 and then ballooning to $130 million in revenue in 2019.

Some of the major milestones included creating and introducing the Rohan duck breed in 2011, and opening an additional four warehouses and distribution centers.

==== The D'Artagnan Farms Foundation ====
===== All for One One for All Farm =====
Founded in 2021 by Daguin and her daughter Alix, AOOA Farm is a non-profit foundation based in Goshen, NY, focusing on regenerative agriculture, silvopasture and agricultural and gastronomic education.

== Awards and honours ==
- 1994 - James Beard Foundation Award - “Who’s Who of Food and Beverage in America”
- 2005 - Bon Appetit Magazine - "Lifetime Achievement Award"
- 2006 - France - "Legion d'Honneur"
- 2010 - L'Academie Culinaire de France - "Dame de l'Année"
- 2014 - Fast Company - "Most Creative People in Business"
- 2017 - La Renaissance Française - "La Médaille d’Or de La Renaissance Française"
- 2018 - International Association of Culinary Professionals - "Trailblazer Award"
- 2018 - Forbes - Small Giants Award

== Professional and charitable organisation ==
- Food Council Member - CityHarvest
- Awards Committee - James Beard Foundation
- Board Member - French American Chamber of Commerce (FACC-NY)

== Television appearances ==
- French Cuisine in America - Charlie Rose."
- My Country, My Kitchen titled "Gascony with Ariane Daguin" on Food Network
- After Hours with Daniel Boulud
- Martha Stewart's Show
- Anthony Bourdain: No Reservations
- Beat Bobby Flay (Guest Judge) (multiple appearances)
- "Cooking Live" with Sara Moulton
- Somebody's Gotta Do It with Mike Rowe
- Transformation of the Meat Industry in 2017 with Tanya Rivero

== Published works ==
- D'Artagnan à New York. Ariane Daguin, Jean-Michel Caradec'h. Éditions Grasset. ISBN 978-2246717614
- D'Artagnan's Glorious Game Cookbook. Ariane Daguin, George Faison, Joanna Pruess. Boston: Little, Brown, 1999.ISBN 978-0316170758
