= Sarah Curran =

Irish musician, poet and composer (1782–1808)

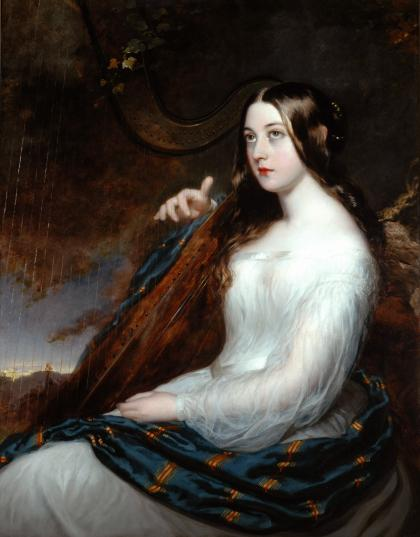
- William Beechey (c. 1805) "Sarah Curran (1782–1808), Playing the Harp"
- Born: 1782; Newmarket, County Cork, Ireland
- Died: 5 May 1808 (aged 25–26); Hythe, Kent, England
- Other name: Sarah Sturgeon
- Occupations: Musician; poet; letterwriter; composer; embroiderer
- Spouse: Henry Sturgeon (m. 1805)
- Partner: Robert Emmet
- Children: 1
- Father: John Philpot Curran
- Relatives: Amelia Curran (sister)

Sarah Curran (married name Sturgeon; 1782 – 5 May 1808) was an Irish musician, poet, belletrist, composer and embroiderer, known for being the fiancée of the executed Irish revolutionary Robert Emmet. Curren's relationship with Emmet, along with her premature death, galvanised her as a subject of nineteenth-century Irish nationalism.

== Early life ==
Curran was born in 1782 in Newmarket, County Cork to John Philpot Curran, a politician and lawyer, and Sarah Curran (née Creagh). One of nine siblings, Curran was the younger sister of the painter Amelia Curran. The family moved to The Priory in Rathfarnham in 1790, where Curran's sister Gertrude died in 1792 after falling out a window. Gertrude (her father's favorite daughter) was buried in the grounds of the house and Curran's father spend hours watching her grave from his window; he also withdraw affection from his other children and her parent's marriage deteriorated.

In 1795, Curran's father threw her mother, pregnant following an affair with The Rev Michael Sandys, out of the family home and forbade her from contacting their children. Curran's father brought legal proceedings against Sandys for having a "criminal conversation" with his wife, in which his own series of affairs were brought into the public spotlight. During this period Curran was sent to live with the family of The Rev Thomas Crawford in Lismore, County Waterford, and there is no evidence that she had any further contact with her mother during her lifetime.

== Relationship with Emmet ==
In 1799, Curran made her début into society at a ball in Wicklow. Curran possibly met Emmet, a friend and classmate her brother Richard at Trinity College Dublin, at her début but their romantic relationship did not start until the autumn of 1802. Keeping their relationship and subsequent engagement secret, the couple corresponded with the aid of Anne Devlin, a revolutionary who worked ostensibly as Emmet's housekeeper. Curran also wrote poetry for Emmet, none of which survives. Emmet when into hiding following the failed Irish rebellion of 1803, but stayed in Harold's Cross to be near Curran. When Emmet was arrested on 25 August, the couple's letters were discovered but since Curran's letters to Emmet were unsigned, her identity was not uncovered by the authorities at that time.

Emmet, whilst imprisoned and on trial for treason, wrote to Curran but the letter was intercepted and her identity revealed. The Curran family home was subsequently searched on 9 September by Henry Charles Sirr; Curran's father was not home and Sirr entered into her bedroom whilst she was still in bed. Curren's sister Amelia managed to burn most of the couple's letters before being stopped by Sirr's officers, and only three pieces of their correspondence survive. Following Emmet's execution on 20 September 1803, Curran became alienated from her father. Angela Byrne posits Curran's father rejection of her, despite his own republican sympathies, likely stemmed from the potential harm that her relationship with Emmet could have on his legal and political career.

== Woodhill ==
Leaving the family home (possibly at the behest of her father) in September 1803, Curran stayed with family friend Cooper Penrose, a Quaker and merchant, in Woodhill, Cork. Curran lived at Woodhill for the next two years, where she became close friends with Penrose's daughters Anne (1771–1827) and Elizabeth "Bess" Penrose. Curran also befriended the writer Anna Maria Chetwode, Elizabeth Wilmot (née Chetwood) and Katherine Wilmot, a traveller and diarist, who themselves were at the centre of a Cork-based literary network.

This literary network of Munster women, termed the Chetwood-Wilmot circle by Angela Byrne, wrote poems, elegies. ballads as well as correspondence. Considered a talented harpist and vocalist, Curran's chief passion was music. Curran also played the piano, and during her lifetime Curran received music tuition from Thomas Moore. Two unpublished compositions by Curran survive in the collection of Martha Wilmot; a 7-stanza piece “On Hearing the Death Watch” and an untitled love song.. Curran also wrote poetry, of which five which survive in Wilmot and Chetwood family papers; ‘The Dream’, ‘The Tear’ 'The Young Man’s Dream’, ‘On Hearing the Death Watch’ and ‘Song'. An embroidery sample by Curran is held at the National Library of Ireland.

== Marriage and death ==
At Woodhill, Curran met her future husband Henry Sturgeon, a British Captain in the Royal Staff Corps. On 25 November 1805, Curran married the Henry Sturgeon at Rathcooney Parish Church in a service officiated by The Rev John Chetwode. The couple subsequently lived in England until the outbreak of the War of the Fourth Coalition in October 1806. Sturgeon was stationed in Messina, Kingdom of Sicily (present-day Italy), and the couple arrived there by 15 December 1806. Curran was deeply unhappy during her time in Sicily, suffering from severe vomiting during her pregnancy as well as loneliness and anxiety. Sturgeon was recalled to England in late 1807, and despite Curran being in the late stages of pregnancy, the couple’s request for a period of leave at Gibraltar was denied.

On 26 December 1807, Curran gave birth unassisted whilst crossing the English Channel during a storm. The couple's son, John, was born a month prematurely and Curran was too ill to care and feed him for the next thirteen days. John died in Portsmouth on 10 January 1808 at 15 days old; Curran was too unwell to attend the funeral. On 5 May 1808, Curran died in Hythe, Kent. Despite Curran's wish to be buried alongside her sister Gertrude at Rathfarnham, her father refused and she was buried at Newmarket. Sturgeon reportedly never recovered from the death of his wife and son, and died in 1814 during the Peninsular War.

== Legacy ==
Washington Irving, one of America's greatest early writers, devoted "The Broken Heart" in his magnum opus The Sketch Book of Geoffrey Crayon, Gent. to the romance between Robert Emmet and Sarah Curran, citing it as an example of how a broken heart can be fatal.

Irish poet Thomas Moore was inspired by her story to write the popular ballads, "She Is Far from the Land" and "Oh Breathe Not His Name!" and the long poem Lalla Rookh.

She is far from the land where her young hero sleeps,
And lovers around her are sighing,
But coldly she turns from their gaze, and weeps,
For her heart in his grave is lying.

The road leading past Saint Enda's Park in Rathfarnham is called Sarah Curran Avenue. The ruins of The Priory still stand across the road from the park, in The Hermitage housing estate.

In her family's home town of Newmarket, County Cork, there is a statue of Sarah Curran standing across the road from the graveyard where she is buried.

Newmarket also have a local anthem called Up Up Newmarket, written by Fr. Norris. Its air is that of God Save Ireland. Sarah Curran is mentioned within the song lyrics.......

Boston boasts of Bunker Hill; brave men fought at Gettysville. Newmarket too, has honours like the rest. Here ’t was Curran first drew breath; after Emmet’s tragic death They laid his sweetheart Sarah here to rest.

Amelia Clotilda Jennings wrote a poem about her called "Sarah Curran's Song."
