= Pujo =

- Commune
- Coat of arms
- Location of Pujo
- Location within France Location within Occitanie
- Coordinates: 43°20′55″N 0°04′00″E
- Country: France
- Region: Occitania
- Department: Hautes-Pyrénées
- Arrondissement: Tarbes
- Canton: Vic-en-Bigorre

Government
  - Mayor (2020–2026): Pascale Labedens
- Area^{1}: 5.28 km^{2} (2.04 sq mi)
- Elevation: 237 m (778 ft)
- Highest elevation: 246 m (807 ft)
- Lowest elevation: 230 m (750 ft)
- Population (2023): 671
  - Density: 127/km^{2} (329/sq mi)
- Time zone: UTC+01:00 (CET)
  - Summer (DST): UTC+02:00 (CEST)
- INSEE/Postal code: 65372 /65500
- ^{1} French Land Register data, which excludes lakes, ponds, glaciers > 1 km^{2} (0.386 sq mi or 247 acres) and river estuaries.

Pujo (French pronunciation: [pyʒo]; Occitan: Pujòu) is a commune in the Hautes-Pyrénées department in south-western France.

== See also ==
- Communes of the Hautes-Pyrénées department
