= Amelia Clotilda Jennings =

Canadian poet and novelist

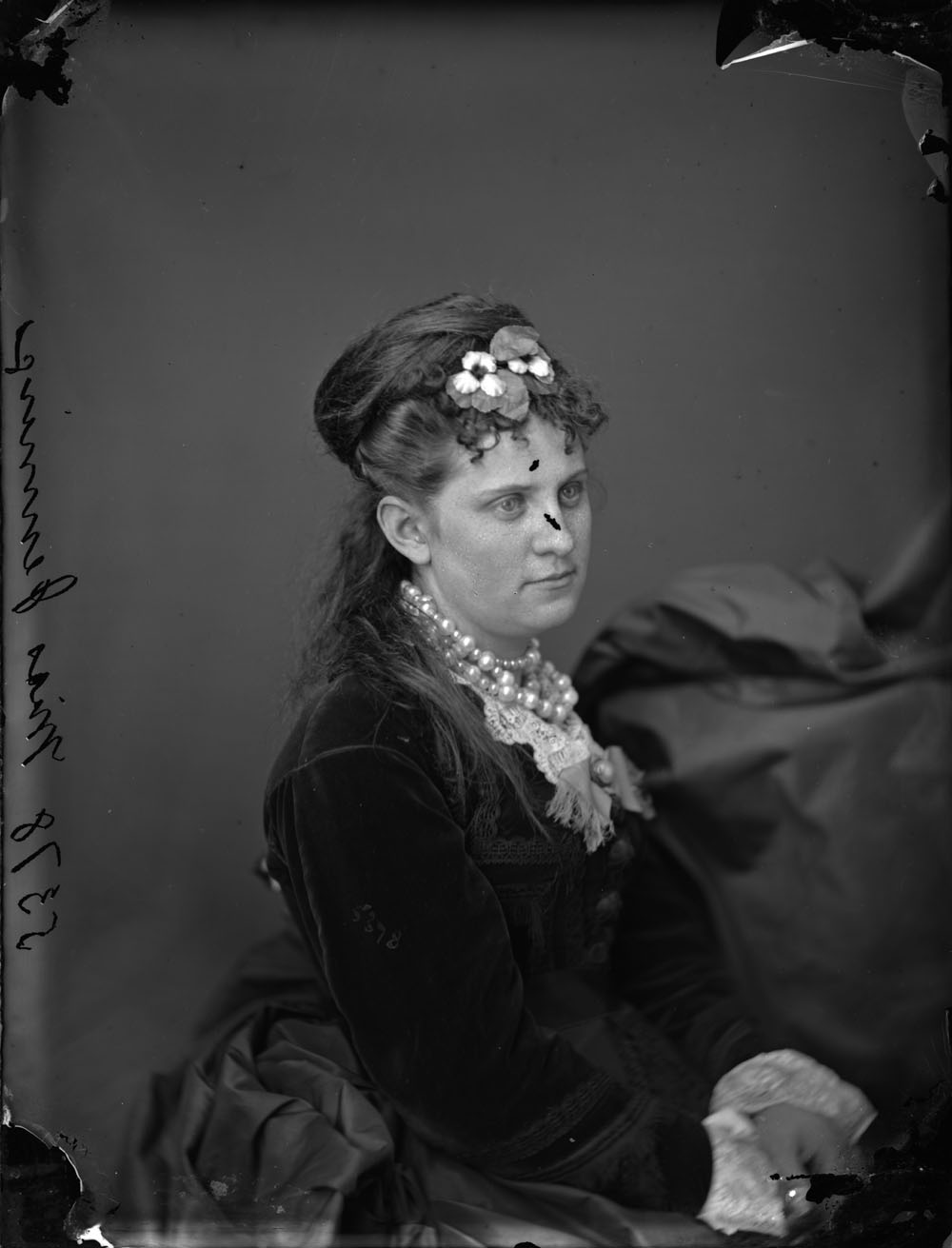
Jennings in 1870

Amelia Clotilda Jennings (died 1895) was a Canadian poet and novelist who wrote under the pseudonyms Maude Alma and Mileta. Jennings was born in Halifax, Nova Scotia in a family of a dry-goods merchant and died in Montreal. She published a number of poems, fictionalized letters, and novels, many relating to her native province. Her books include poetry collection Linden Rhymes (1854), "tale and poem" The White Rose in Acadia and Autumn in Nova Scotia (1855), novel Isabel Leicester (1874), and poetry collection North Mountain, near Grand-Pré (1883).

She wrote a poem about Sarah Curran called "Sarah Curran's Song."
