= Andrest =

- Commune
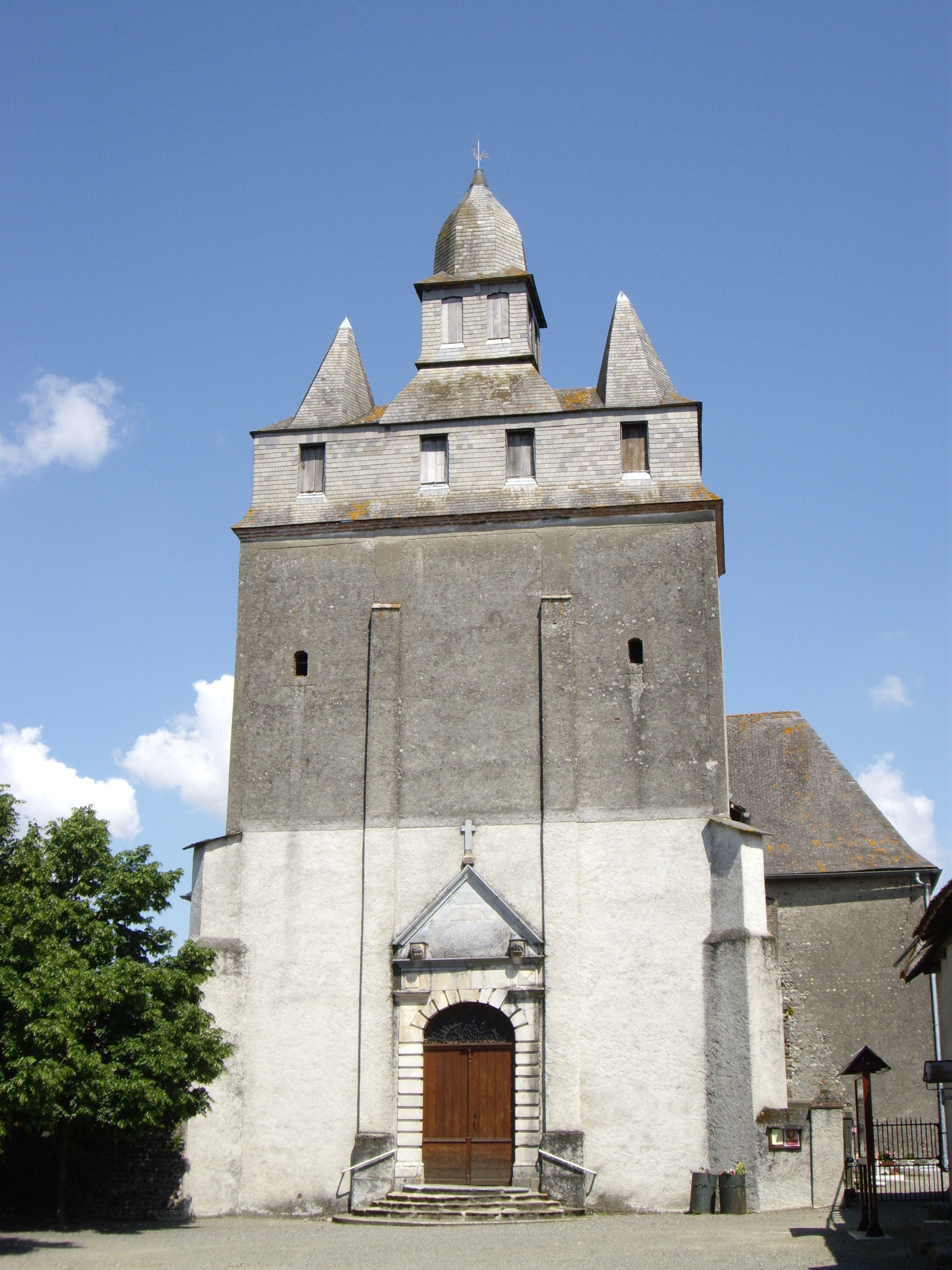
- The church of Saint-Barthélémy

- Coat of arms
- Location of Andrest
- Location within France Location within Occitanie
- Coordinates: 43°19′03″N 0°03′43″E
- Country: France
- Region: Occitania
- Department: Hautes-Pyrénées
- Arrondissement: Tarbes
- Canton: Vic-en-Bigorre
- Intercommunality: Adour Madiran

Government
  - Mayor (2020–2026): Louis Dintrans
- Area^{1}: 6.19 km^{2} (2.39 sq mi)
- Elevation: 254 m (833 ft)
- Highest elevation: 266 m (873 ft)
- Lowest elevation: 241 m (791 ft)
- Population (2023): 1,340
  - Density: 216/km^{2} (561/sq mi)
- Time zone: UTC+01:00 (CET)
  - Summer (DST): UTC+02:00 (CEST)
- INSEE/Postal code: 65007 /65390
- ^{1} French Land Register data, which excludes lakes, ponds, glaciers > 1 km^{2} (0.386 sq mi or 247 acres) and river estuaries.

Andrest (French pronunciation: [ɑ̃dʁɛst]) is a commune in the Hautes-Pyrénées department in southwestern France.

== Population ==
Historical population
Year	Pop.	±% p.a.
1968	713	—
1975	881	+3.07%
1982	1,002	+1.86%
1990	1,253	+2.83%
1999	1,229	−0.21%
2007	1,314	+0.84%
2012	1,430	+1.71%
2017	1,396	−0.48%
2023	1,340	−0.68%
Source: INSEE

== See also ==
- Communes of the Hautes-Pyrénées department
