= Camalès =

- Commune
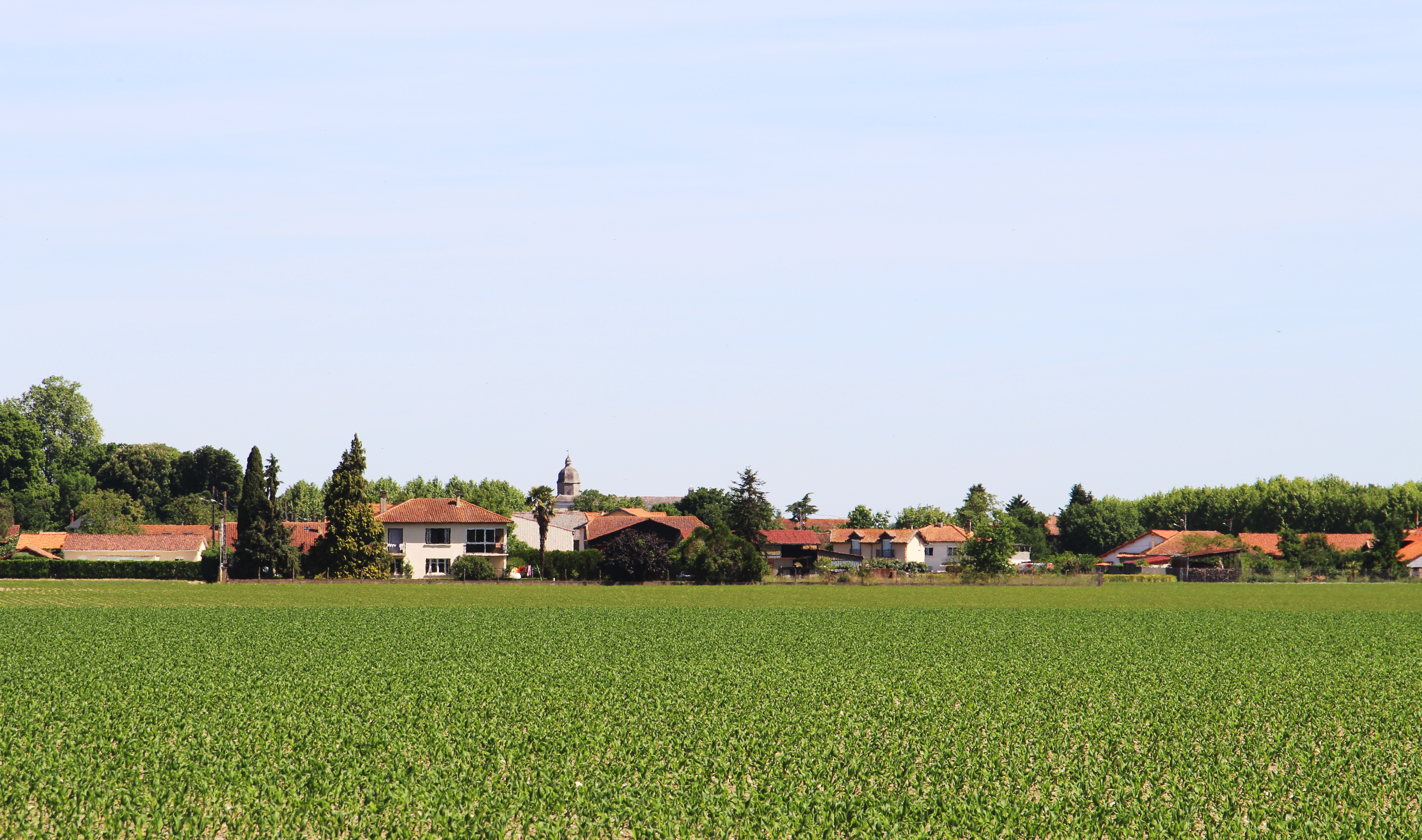
- View of Camalès

- Coat of arms
- Location of Camalès
- Location within France Location within Occitanie
- Coordinates: 43°21′41″N 0°04′32″E
- Country: France
- Region: Occitania
- Department: Hautes-Pyrénées
- Arrondissement: Tarbes
- Canton: Vic-en-Bigorre

Government
  - Mayor (2020–2026): François Tabel
- Area^{1}: 4.67 km^{2} (1.80 sq mi)
- Elevation: 232 m (761 ft)
- Highest elevation: 239 m (784 ft)
- Lowest elevation: 221 m (725 ft)
- Population (2023): 371
  - Density: 79.4/km^{2} (206/sq mi)
- Time zone: UTC+01:00 (CET)
  - Summer (DST): UTC+02:00 (CEST)
- INSEE/Postal code: 65121 /65500
- ^{1} French Land Register data, which excludes lakes, ponds, glaciers > 1 km^{2} (0.386 sq mi or 247 acres) and river estuaries.

Camalès (French pronunciation: [kamalɛs]; Occitan: Camalèrs) is a commune in the Hautes-Pyrénées department in south-western France.

== See also ==
- Communes of the Hautes-Pyrénées department
