= Canton of Vic-en-Bigorre =

Coordinates: 43.39°N 0.05°E

The canton of Vic-en-Bigorre is an administrative division of the Hautes-Pyrénées department, southwestern France. Its borders were modified at the French canton reorganisation which came into effect in March 2015. Its seat is in Vic-en-Bigorre.

It consists of the following communes:

1. Andrest
2. Artagnan
3. Aurensan
4. Caixon
5. Camalès
6. Escaunets
7. Gayan
8. Lagarde
9. Marsac
10. Nouilhan
11. Oroix
12. Pintac
13. Pujo
14. Saint-Lézer
15. Sanous
16. Sarniguet
17. Siarrouy
18. Talazac
19. Tarasteix
20. Vic-en-Bigorre
21. Villenave-près-Béarn
22. Villenave-près-Marsac
