= Sanous =

- Commune
- Coat of arms
- Location of Sanous
- Location within France Location within Occitanie
- Coordinates: 43°22′43″N 0°00′11″E
- Country: France
- Region: Occitania
- Department: Hautes-Pyrénées
- Arrondissement: Tarbes
- Canton: Vic-en-Bigorre
- Intercommunality: Adour Madiran
- Area^{1}: 1.63 km^{2} (0.63 sq mi)
- Elevation: 230 m (750 ft)
- Highest elevation: 322 m (1,056 ft)
- Lowest elevation: 216 m (709 ft)
- Population (2023): 98
  - Density: 60/km^{2} (160/sq mi)
- Time zone: UTC+01:00 (CET)
  - Summer (DST): UTC+02:00 (CEST)
- INSEE/Postal code: 65403 /65500
- ^{1} French Land Register data, which excludes lakes, ponds, glaciers > 1 km^{2} (0.386 sq mi or 247 acres) and river estuaries.

Sanous is a commune in the Hautes-Pyrénées department in south-western France.

== See also ==
- Communes of the Hautes-Pyrénées department
