= Siarrouy =

- Commune
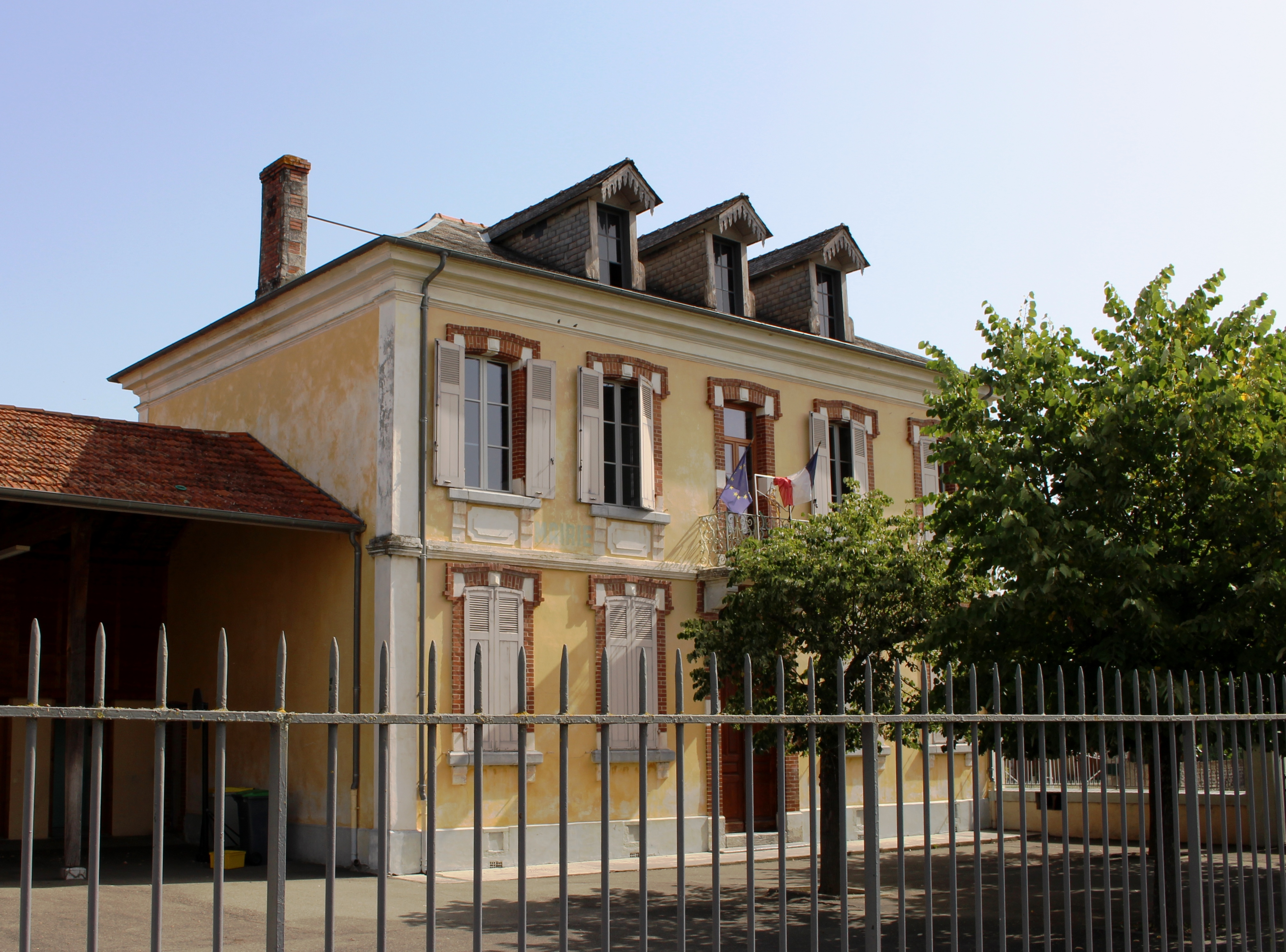
- Town hall

- Coat of arms
- Location of Siarrouy
- Location within France Location within Occitanie
- Coordinates: 43°19′18″N 0°02′16″E
- Country: France
- Region: Occitania
- Department: Hautes-Pyrénées
- Arrondissement: Tarbes
- Canton: Vic-en-Bigorre
- Intercommunality: Adour Madiran

Government
  - Mayor (2020–2026): Bernard Philippe Bats
- Area^{1}: 6.2 km^{2} (2.4 sq mi)
- Elevation: 230 m (750 ft)
- Highest elevation: 346 m (1,135 ft)
- Lowest elevation: 240 m (790 ft)
- Population (2023): 453
  - Density: 73/km^{2} (190/sq mi)
- Time zone: UTC+01:00 (CET)
  - Summer (DST): UTC+02:00 (CEST)
- INSEE/Postal code: 65425 /65500
- ^{1} French Land Register data, which excludes lakes, ponds, glaciers > 1 km^{2} (0.386 sq mi or 247 acres) and river estuaries.

Siarrouy (French pronunciation: [sjaʁwi]; Occitan: Siarroi) is a commune in the Hautes-Pyrénées department in south-western France.

== See also ==
- Communes of the Hautes-Pyrénées department
