= Caixon =

- Commune
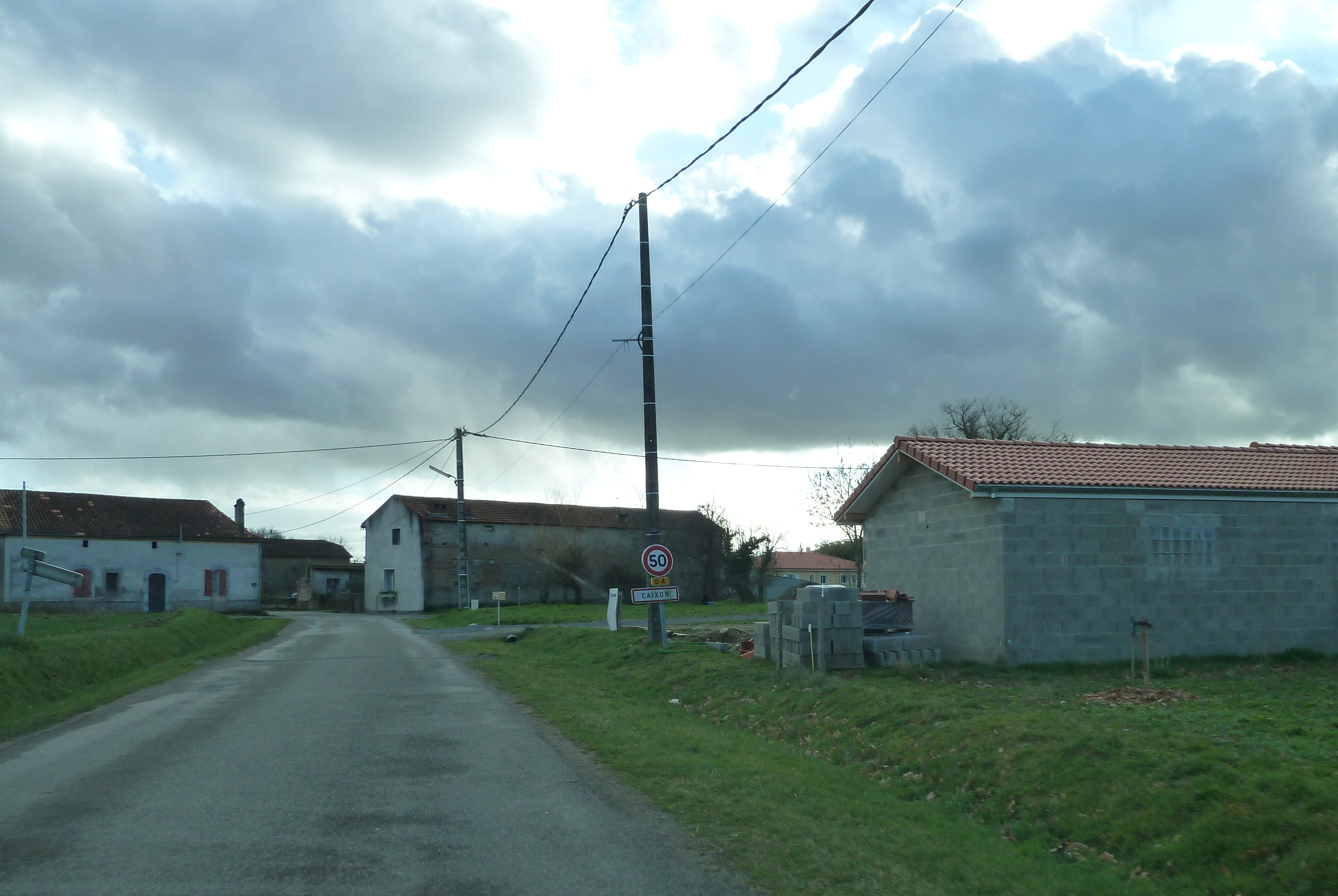
- The road into Caixon

- Coat of arms
- Location of Caixon
- Location within France Location within Occitanie
- Coordinates: 43°24′38″N 0°01′38″E
- Country: France
- Region: Occitania
- Department: Hautes-Pyrénées
- Arrondissement: Tarbes
- Canton: Vic-en-Bigorre
- Intercommunality: Adour Madiran

Government
  - Mayor (2020–2026): Aurélien Simonet
- Area^{1}: 8.55 km^{2} (3.30 sq mi)
- Elevation: 204 m (669 ft)
- Highest elevation: 317 m (1,040 ft)
- Lowest elevation: 192 m (630 ft)
- Population (2023): 340
  - Density: 40/km^{2} (100/sq mi)
- Time zone: UTC+01:00 (CET)
  - Summer (DST): UTC+02:00 (CEST)
- INSEE/Postal code: 65119 /65500
- ^{1} French Land Register data, which excludes lakes, ponds, glaciers > 1 km^{2} (0.386 sq mi or 247 acres) and river estuaries.

Caixon is a commune in the Hautes-Pyrénées department in south-western France.

== See also ==
- Communes of the Hautes-Pyrénées department
