= Oroix =

Administrative division in Occitanie, France

- Commune
- Coat of arms
- Location of Oroix
- Location within France Location within Occitanie
- Coordinates: 43°18′04″N 0°01′45″W
- Country: France
- Region: Occitania
- Department: Hautes-Pyrénées
- Arrondissement: Tarbes
- Canton: Vic-en-Bigorre

Government
  - Mayor (2020–2026): Michel Suzac
- Area^{1}: 8.9 km^{2} (3.4 sq mi)
- Elevation: 330 m (1,080 ft)
- Highest elevation: 384 m (1,260 ft)
- Lowest elevation: 276 m (906 ft)
- Population (2023): 99
  - Density: 11/km^{2} (29/sq mi)
- Time zone: UTC+01:00 (CET)
  - Summer (DST): UTC+02:00 (CEST)
- INSEE/Postal code: 65341 /65320
- ^{1} French Land Register data, which excludes lakes, ponds, glaciers > 1 km^{2} (0.386 sq mi or 247 acres) and river estuaries.

Oroix is a commune in the Hautes-Pyrénées department in south-western France.

== See also ==
- Communes of the Hautes-Pyrénées department
