= Talazac =

- Commune
- Coat of arms
- Location of Talazac
- Location within France Location within Occitanie
- Coordinates: 43°20′02″N 0°02′20″E
- Country: France
- Region: Occitania
- Department: Hautes-Pyrénées
- Arrondissement: Tarbes
- Canton: Vic-en-Bigorre
- Intercommunality: Adour Madiran

Government
  - Mayor (2020–2026): Olivier Eudes
- Area^{1}: 1.58 km^{2} (0.61 sq mi)
- Elevation: 249 m (817 ft)
- Highest elevation: 344 m (1,129 ft)
- Lowest elevation: 238 m (781 ft)
- Population (2023): 76
  - Density: 48/km^{2} (120/sq mi)
- Time zone: UTC+01:00 (CET)
  - Summer (DST): UTC+02:00 (CEST)
- INSEE/Postal code: 65438 /65500
- ^{1} French Land Register data, which excludes lakes, ponds, glaciers > 1 km^{2} (0.386 sq mi or 247 acres) and river estuaries.

Talazac (French pronunciation: [talazak]; Occitan: Talasac) is a commune in the Hautes-Pyrénées department in south-western France.

== See also ==
- Communes of the Hautes-Pyrénées department
