= Henry Sturgeon =

British Army officer

Lieutenant-Colonel Henry Sturgeon
- Born: c. 1781
- Died: 19 March 1814 (aged 32–33); Near Vic-en-Bigorre, France
- Spouse: Sarah Curran (m. 1805; died 1808)
- Children: 1
- Military career
- Allegiance: Kingdom of Great Britain; United Kingdom of Great Britain and Ireland
- Branch: British Army
- Service years: 1795–1814
- Rank: Lieutenant-Colonel
- Units: Royal Artillery; Royal Staff Corps
- Conflicts: Anglo-Spanish War; Egyptian Campaign; Peninsular War

Lieutenant-Colonel Henry Sturgeon (c. 1781 – 19 March 1814) was a British Army officer who fought in the Revolutionary and Napoleonic Wars, distinguishing himself in the Peninsular War.

== Biography ==
Sturgeon was born about 1781, and was admitted to the Royal Military Academy, Woolwich as a cadet in May 1795. He was commissioned as second lieutenant in the Royal Artillery on 1 January 1796. He became lieutenant on 21 August 1797. He served in Pulteney's Ferrol Expedition in 1800, and in the Egyptian Expedition, and was wounded in the Battle of Alexandria on 13 March 1801.

On 25 June 1803 Sturgeon was transferred to the Royal Staff Corps with the rank of captain, and became major in it on 1 June 1809. He served throughout the war in the Peninsula, always showing himself "a clever fellow," as Lord Wellington described him (in a letter to Lord Liverpool, 19 December 1809). At the Siege of Ciudad Rodrigo, his effort and ability from the commencement of the siege were very conspicuous. He reconnoitred the breaches before the assault, and guided a column which was told off, at his suggestion, to make a demonstration on the right of the main breach. The column afterwards joined the stormers at that breach. Sturgeon was specially mentioned in Wellington's despatch, both for his services during the siege and for his construction of a bridge over the Águeda, which was an indispensable preliminary to it. He was made brevet lieutenant-colonel on 6 February 1812.

Sturgeon was again specially mentioned in the Salamanca despatch, and was sent three months afterwards to make a bridge at Almaraz. In April 1813 he was placed in charge of the corps of guides, and the post-office and communications of the army. In February 1814 he took a prominent part in the bridging of the Adour, and was one of the officers praised by General Hope in his report for the zeal they showed in the execution of that project. C. J. Napier, who speaks of it as a "stupendous undertaking, which must always rank among the prodigies of war" in his War in the Peninsula, attributes its conception to Sturgeon.

A few weeks afterwards, on 19 March, Sturgeon was killed by a bullet as he was riding through a vineyard during an action near Vic-en-Bigorre. Napier described him as "Skilled to excellence in almost every branch of war, and possessing a variety of accomplishments, he used his gifts so gently for himself and so usefully for the service that envy offered no bar to admiration, and the whole army felt painfully mortified that his merits were passed unnoticed in the public despatches".

== Personal life ==
On 25 November 1805, Sturgeon married Sarah Curran, an Irish musician, poet and composer, at Rathcooney Parish Church in Cork. On 26 December 1807, Curran gave birth unassisted whilst crossing the English Channel during a storm. The couple's son, John, was born a month prematurely and Curran was too ill to care and feed him for the next thirteen days; John died in Portsmouth on 10 January 1808 at 15 days old. On 5 May 1808, Curran died in Hythe, Kent.
