= Artagnan =

- Commune
- Coat of arms
- Location of Artagnan
- Location within France Location within Occitanie
- Coordinates: 43°24′13″N 0°04′36″E
- Country: France
- Region: Occitania
- Department: Hautes-Pyrénées
- Arrondissement: Tarbes
- Canton: Vic-en-Bigorre
- Intercommunality: CC Adour Madiran

Government
  - Mayor (2020–2026): Stéphane Étienne
- Area^{1}: 4.94 km^{2} (1.91 sq mi)
- Elevation: 210 m (690 ft)
- Highest elevation: 214 m (702 ft)
- Lowest elevation: 199 m (653 ft)
- Population (2023): 504
  - Density: 102/km^{2} (264/sq mi)
- Time zone: UTC+01:00 (CET)
  - Summer (DST): UTC+02:00 (CEST)
- INSEE/Postal code: 65035 /65500
- ^{1} French Land Register data, which excludes lakes, ponds, glaciers > 1 km^{2} (0.386 sq mi or 247 acres) and river estuaries.

Artagnan (French pronunciation: [aʁtaɲɑ̃]; Gascon: Artanhan) is a commune in the Hautes-Pyrénées department in southwestern France.

== Population ==
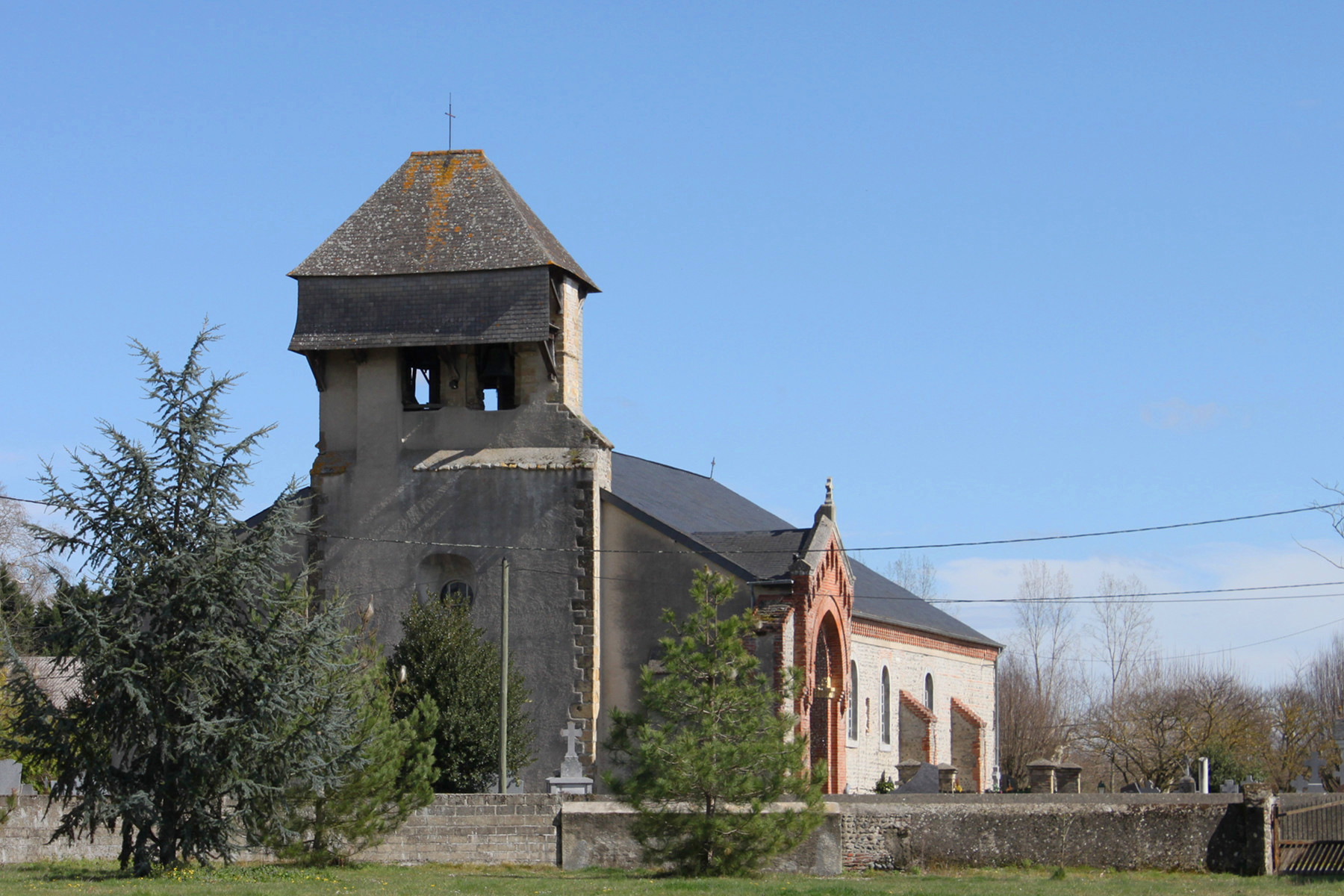
Saint-Nazaire's church, Artagnan, Hautes-Pyrénées

Historical population
Year	Pop.	±% p.a.
1968	480	—
1975	440	−1.24%
1982	431	−0.29%
1990	436	+0.14%
1999	433	−0.08%
2007	478	+1.24%
2012	511	+1.34%
2017	512	+0.04%
2023	504	−0.26%
Source: INSEE

== See also ==
- Communes of the Hautes-Pyrénées department
