= Vic-en-Bigorre =

- Commune
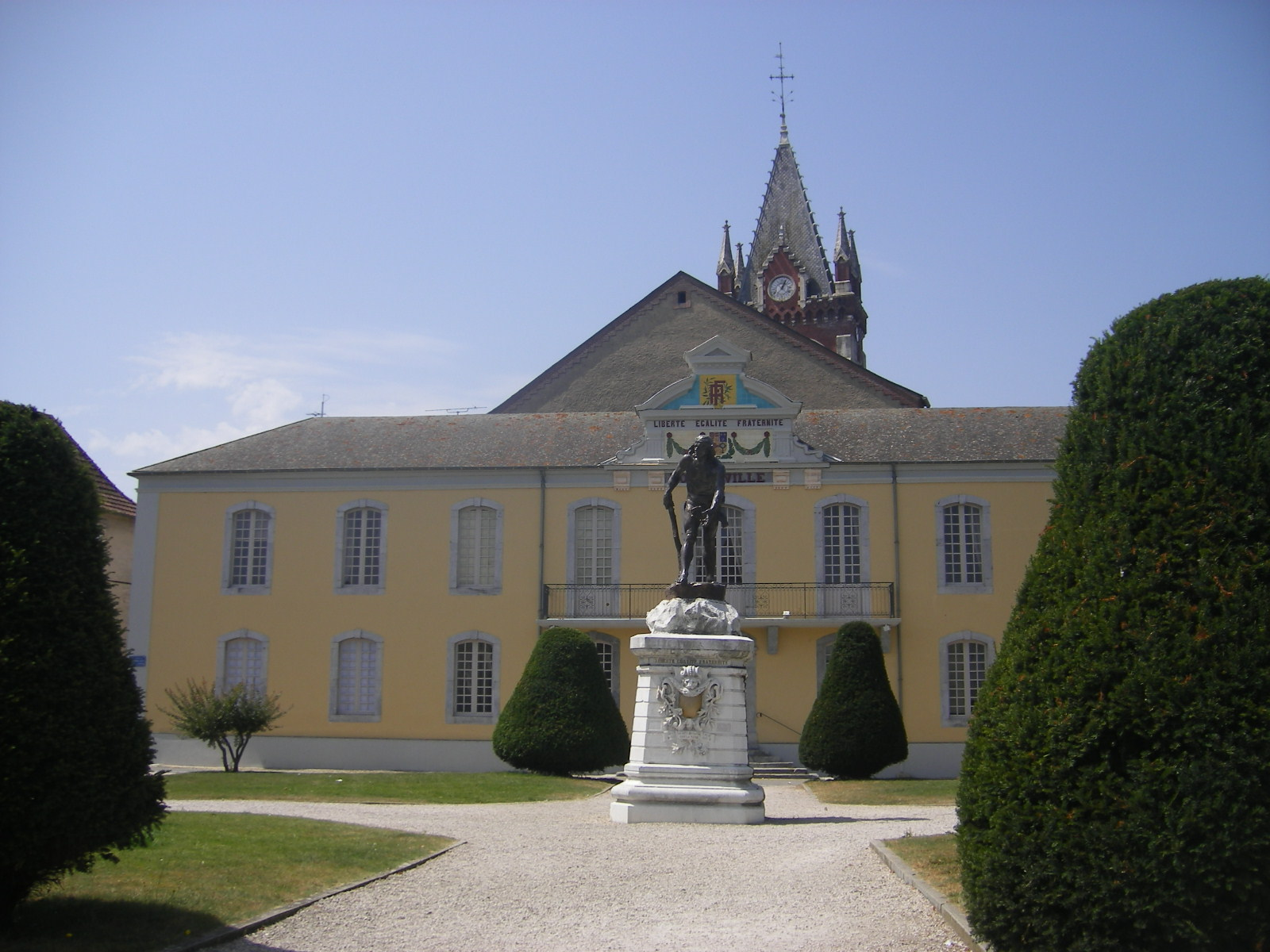
- Town hall of Vic-en-Bigorre

- Coat of arms
- Location of Vic-en-Bigorre
- Location within France Location within Occitanie
- Coordinates: 43°23′11″N 0°03′14″E
- Country: France
- Region: Occitania
- Department: Hautes-Pyrénées
- Arrondissement: Tarbes
- Canton: Vic-en-Bigorre
- Intercommunality: Adour Madiran

Government
  - Mayor (2020–2026): Clément Menet
- Area^{1}: 31.93 km^{2} (12.33 sq mi)
- Elevation: 250 m (820 ft)
- Highest elevation: 323 m (1,060 ft)
- Lowest elevation: 192 m (630 ft)
- Population (2023): 4,845
  - Density: 151.7/km^{2} (393.0/sq mi)
- Time zone: UTC+01:00 (CET)
  - Summer (DST): UTC+02:00 (CEST)
- INSEE/Postal code: 65460 /65500
- ^{1} French Land Register data, which excludes lakes, ponds, glaciers > 1 km^{2} (0.386 sq mi or 247 acres) and river estuaries.

Vic-en-Bigorre (French pronunciation: [vik ɑ̃ biɡɔʁ], literally Vic in Bigorre; Occitan: Vic de Bigòrra) is a commune in the Hautes-Pyrénées department in south-western France.

== Geography ==
=== Climate ===
Vic-en-Bigorre has an oceanic climate (Köppen climate classification Cfb). The average annual temperature in Vic-en-Bigorre is 13.1 °C (55.6 °F). The average annual rainfall is 937.3 mm (36.90 in) with April as the wettest month. The temperatures are highest on average in August, at around 20.9 °C (69.6 °F), and lowest in January, at around 5.7 °C (42.3 °F). The highest temperature ever recorded in Vic-en-Bigorre was 40.4 °C (104.7 °F) on 4 August 2003; the coldest temperature ever recorded was −12.0 °C (10.4 °F) on 25 December 2001.

Climate data for Vic-en-Bigorre (1991−2020 normals, extremes 1987−present)
Month	Jan	Feb	Mar	Apr	May	Jun	Jul	Aug	Sep	Oct	Nov	Dec	Year
Record high °C (°F)	22.5 (72.5)	26.8 (80.2)	29.2 (84.6)	30.3 (86.5)	33.5 (92.3)	40.1 (104.2)	39.7 (103.5)	40.4 (104.7)	36.1 (97.0)	34.1 (93.4)	26.6 (79.9)	22.6 (72.7)	40.4 (104.7)
Mean daily maximum °C (°F)	10.7 (51.3)	12.0 (53.6)	15.3 (59.5)	17.6 (63.7)	21.2 (70.2)	24.7 (76.5)	26.6 (79.9)	27.0 (80.6)	24.2 (75.6)	20.1 (68.2)	14.2 (57.6)	11.4 (52.5)	18.8 (65.8)
Daily mean °C (°F)	5.7 (42.3)	6.5 (43.7)	9.5 (49.1)	12.0 (53.6)	15.7 (60.3)	19.1 (66.4)	20.8 (69.4)	20.9 (69.6)	17.8 (64.0)	14.0 (57.2)	9.0 (48.2)	6.4 (43.5)	13.1 (55.6)
Mean daily minimum °C (°F)	0.8 (33.4)	1.1 (34.0)	3.7 (38.7)	6.4 (43.5)	10.2 (50.4)	13.5 (56.3)	15.0 (59.0)	14.8 (58.6)	11.4 (52.5)	8.0 (46.4)	3.9 (39.0)	1.4 (34.5)	7.5 (45.5)
Record low °C (°F)	−10.0 (14.0)	−12.0 (10.4)	−9.3 (15.3)	−3.4 (25.9)	0.5 (32.9)	3.4 (38.1)	6.0 (42.8)	4.7 (40.5)	1.1 (34.0)	−4.0 (24.8)	−10.7 (12.7)	−12.0 (10.4)	−12.0 (10.4)
Average precipitation mm (inches)	86.6 (3.41)	69.9 (2.75)	74.0 (2.91)	99.5 (3.92)	95.5 (3.76)	74.2 (2.92)	65.1 (2.56)	58.2 (2.29)	64.5 (2.54)	71.0 (2.80)	98.6 (3.88)	80.2 (3.16)	937.3 (36.90)
Average precipitation days (≥ 1.0 mm)	10.9	9.8	9.9	11.6	12.1	8.8	7.4	7.6	8.2	10.0	11.7	10.1	118.1
Source: Météo-France

== Population ==
Historical population
Year	Pop.	±% p.a.
1968	4,389	—
1975	4,559	+0.54%
1982	4,568	+0.03%
1990	4,888	+0.85%
1999	4,783	−0.24%
2007	5,099	+0.80%
2012	5,071	−0.11%
2017	4,897	−0.70%
2023	4,845	−0.18%
Source: INSEE

== See also ==
- Communes of the Hautes-Pyrénées department
