= Marsac, Hautes-Pyrénées =

Marsac
- Commune
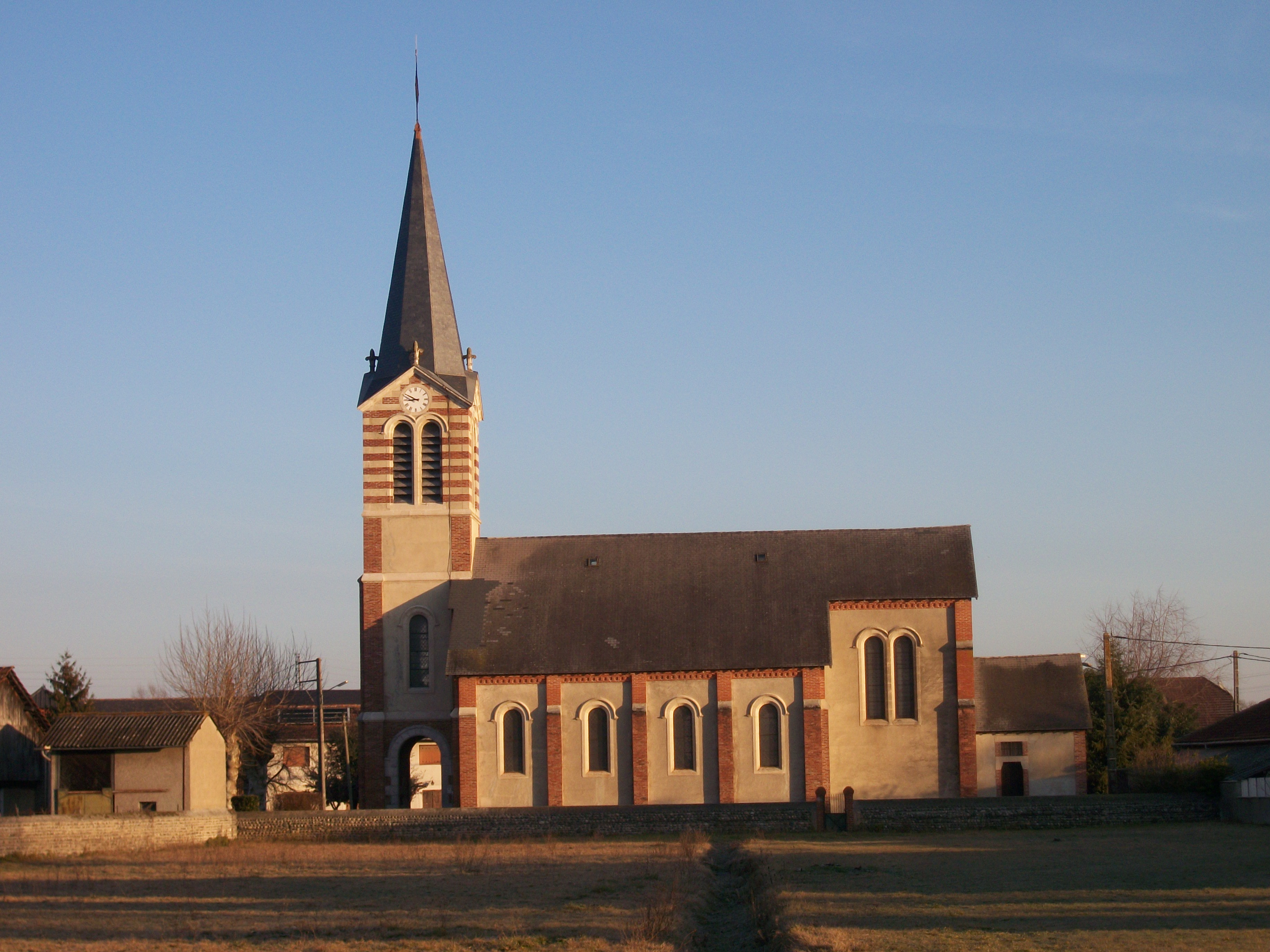
- The church of Saint-André

- Coat of arms
- Location of Marsac
- Location within France Location within Occitanie
- Coordinates: 43°19′46″N 0°05′16″E
- Country: France
- Region: Occitania
- Department: Hautes-Pyrénées
- Arrondissement: Tarbes
- Canton: Vic-en-Bigorre
- Intercommunality: Adour Madiran

Government
  - Mayor (2020–2026): Lucien Lafon-Placette
- Area^{1}: 1.55 km^{2} (0.60 sq mi)
- Elevation: 247 m (810 ft)
- Highest elevation: 251 m (823 ft)
- Lowest elevation: 238 m (781 ft)
- Population (2023): 235
  - Density: 152/km^{2} (393/sq mi)
- Time zone: UTC+01:00 (CET)
  - Summer (DST): UTC+02:00 (CEST)
- INSEE/Postal code: 65299 /65500
- ^{1} French Land Register data, which excludes lakes, ponds, glaciers > 1 km^{2} (0.386 sq mi or 247 acres) and river estuaries.

Marsac (French pronunciation: [maʁsak]; Occitan: Marçac) is a commune in the Hautes-Pyrénées department in south-western France. It has a church, built in 1882, dedicated to St. Andre. The church bell is much older, dated 1683. Municipal scales built in the 19th century stand in a roundabout near the town hall.

== See also ==
- Communes of the Hautes-Pyrénées department
