= Arturo Peyrot =

Italian painter (1908–1993)

- Born: 5 June 1908; Rome, Italy
- Died: 1993 (aged 84–85); Madrid, Spain
- Known for: Painter and Writer
- Notable work: Frescoes in the Great Hall of the University of Rome
- Awards: Fossati Prize

Arturo Peyrot (1908 – 1993) was an Italian artist, painter and writer. He was born in Rome, Italy in 1908, where he studied at the Rome University of Fine Arts.

== Biography ==
Arturo Peyrot graduated in 1932, when he won the Fossati award as their best student.

Peyrot was Giorgio Morandi's disciple.

In 1937 he obtained the Dante Alighieri scholarship to attend the High Culture courses in Rhodes and Athens.

He won the Agostini Award in Terni, in 1947.

In 1950 he moved to Paris and in 1952 he moved to Spain, with a grant from the Spanish Ministry of Foreign Affairs, where he settled permanently and where he developed most of his artistic activity.

He has to his credit a wide list of awards, more than 40 exhibitions in both Europe and America, and paintings, murals and stained glass windows in numerous Italian and Spanish institutions. As an example, Peyrot did some of the frescoes in the Great Hall of the University of Rome.

His work evolved from the avant-garde and, after an abstract phase, he slowly returned to figurative art with a very personal style.

Another facet of his is collaborating as a cartoonist in Italian and Spanish magazines and newspapers, including Abc and Blanco y Negro.

Peyrot passed away in Madrid, Spain in 1993, aged 75.
