= Gayan, Hautes-Pyrénées =

Gayan
- Commune
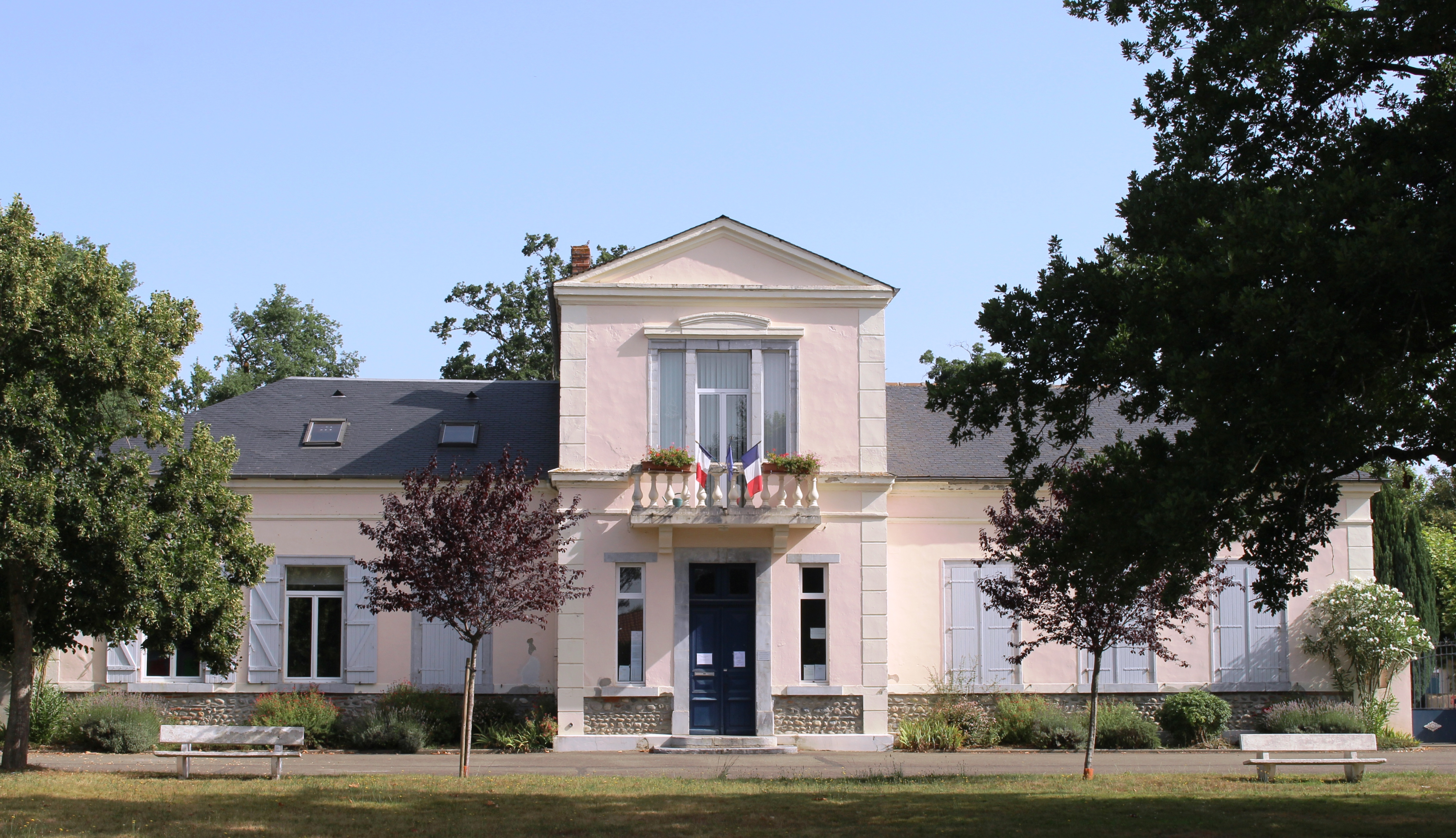
- Town hall

- Coat of arms
- Location of Gayan
- Location within France Location within Occitanie
- Coordinates: 43°18′34″N 0°02′41″E
- Country: France
- Region: Occitania
- Department: Hautes-Pyrénées
- Arrondissement: Tarbes
- Canton: Vic-en-Bigorre
- Intercommunality: CA Tarbes-Lourdes-Pyrénées
- Area^{1}: 2.78 km^{2} (1.07 sq mi)
- Elevation: 250 m (820 ft)
- Highest elevation: 265 m (869 ft)
- Lowest elevation: 252 m (827 ft)
- Population (2023): 264
  - Density: 95.0/km^{2} (246/sq mi)
- Time zone: UTC+01:00 (CET)
  - Summer (DST): UTC+02:00 (CEST)
- INSEE/Postal code: 65189 /65320
- ^{1} French Land Register data, which excludes lakes, ponds, glaciers > 1 km^{2} (0.386 sq mi or 247 acres) and river estuaries.

Gayan is a commune in the Hautes-Pyrénées department in south-western France.

== See also ==
- Communes of the Hautes-Pyrénées department
