= D'Artagnan (food company) =

American food company

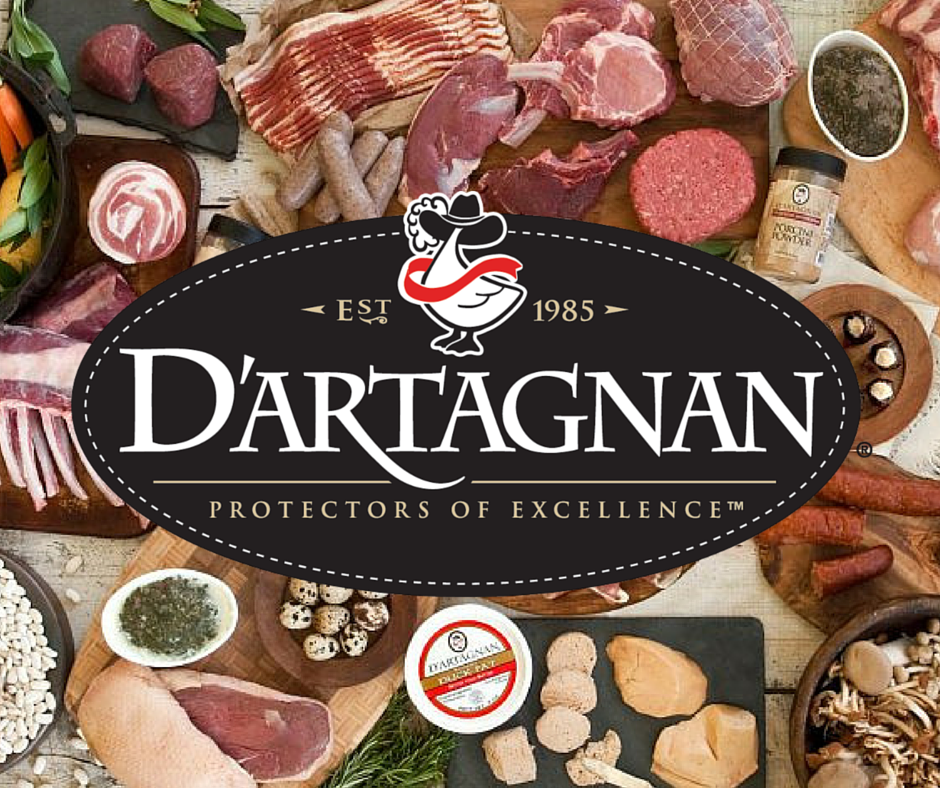
- Company type: Private
- Industry: Food, online, retail, restaurants
- Founded: 1985
- Founder: Ariane Daguin
- Headquarters: Union, New Jersey
- Area served: United States
- Products: Beef, pork, lamb, veal, venison, bison, buffalo, rabbit, wild hare, wild boar, duck, poultry, turkey, goose, capon, pheasant, poussin, quail, guinea hen, squab, wild Scottish game, foie gras, charcuterie, truffles, mushrooms, caviar
- Website: www.dartagnan.com

D’Artagnan (D'Artagnan, Inc., also known as D'Artagnan Foods) is a food seller and manufacturer of beef, pork, lamb, veal, pâtés, sausages, smoked and cured charcuterie, all-natural and organic poultry, game meat, free-range meat, foie gras, wild mushrooms, and truffles.

Privately owned by Ariane Daguin, who co-founded the company in 1985, its corporate headquarters and distribution center are in Union, New Jersey. The company generates revenue through direct sales to restaurants, retailers and the consumer public on its website. Reporting $50 million in sales in 2008, D’Artagnan employs 125 people, and has a fleet of 18 trucks that deliver products to restaurants throughout the Mid-Atlantic region. Consumer website orders are shipped in insulated boxes by overnight courier.

== History ==
D'Artagnan was founded in 1985 by Ariane Daguin and George Faison. Their partnership was formed while working together at a charcuterie shop in New York City. There they met a farmer with the first domestically raised foie gras in the United States. He was looking for distribution for his product, which the charcuterie shop declined. Daguin and Faison founded D’Artagnan to distribute it themselves.

D’Artagnan originally sold whole lobes of raw foie gras to the chefs of New York City. At the time the only foie gras available to restaurants was canned product imported from Europe. D’Artagnan's product line quickly expanded to include game meats and heritage breed poultry, organic chicken, heritage turkey, grass-fed beef, humanely-raised veal and pork, pheasant, quail, squab and prepared products like pâté, dry-cured sausages, smoked duck breast and duck prosciutto. D’Artagnan was an early proponent of humanely raised, antibiotic and hormone-free organic meat. The company sources from small farmers and creates cooperatives of farms where possible, to ensure that animals are raised in humane conditions. They procure meats from small family farms that are committed to humane, sustainable free-range, antibiotic and hormone free methods of animal husbandry. D’Artagnan contracts with 35 co-ops nationwide, representing about 1,500 farmers as of 2009. D’Artagnan's line of products became more available to the consumer public when it began selling items to major grocery stores Balducci's and the Food Emporium in 1996. "There is no reason you should be brutal to animals when you don't have to," Daguin was reported saying, "This is the first time ever I saw pigs being killed and not shrieking, because they didn't realize it."

In February 2002, D’Artagnan opened a restaurant and retail shop, D’Artagnan the Rotisserie, which served Gascon specialties, including foie gras burgers, cassoulet, duck confit, Armagnac, and the wines of the Southwest region of France. A retail area sold D’Artagnan prepared products such as pâtés and terrines. William Grimes reviewed D’Artagnan the Rotisserie in The New York Times, and gave the restaurant two stars, saying: "D’Artagnan has the real thing. In fact it has so much personality it can sell it by the pound. The food is authentic, robust, earthy and powerfully flavored." The restaurant closed in 2004.

In 2005, Daguin bought out Faison's share of the company to become the sole owner. She continues to run the company as CEO, with Andrew Wertheim as president, and David Irwin as CFO.

D’Artagnan celebrated its 25th anniversary in February 2010 with a week of food-and-wine-related events, live music, an art exhibition, a rugby game and dinners prepared by visiting French chefs and their American counterparts.

== Books ==
- D’Artagnan’s Glorious Game Cookbook (1999) Ariane Daguin, George Faison and Joanna Pruess
- D'Artagnan a New York (2010) Ariane Daguin, Grasset
