= André Daguin =

French chef (1935–2019)

- Born: 20 September 1935; Auch, France
- Died: 3 December 2019 (aged 84); Auch, France
- Occupation: Chef

André Daguin (20 September 1935 – 3 December 2019) was a French chef who owned, cooked, and ran the kitchen at Hôtel de France in Auch, which he inherited from his parents, before selling it to Roland Garreau in 1997.

== Biography ==
Daguin worked as a chef for 40 years. He was heralded for his regional cuisine, such as duck breast and a fresh foie gras with langoustines, or a white bean ice cream.

He is the co-author of several books on cooking, such as Le nouveau cuisinier Gascon (1981), and 1 canard 2 Daguin (2010).

Daguin played rugby at lycée d'Auch de Salinis. He attempted to run for office in Auch several times with the Union for French Democracy, but was unsuccessful. His daughter, Ariane, works as a restaurateur in the United States, while his son, Arnaud, is a restaurateur in France.

Daguin served as President of Union des métiers de l'industrie hôtelière (UMIH), which is a union of professional restaurateurs in France. He served on the French Economic, Social and Environmental Council, and was a columnist for Les Grandes Gueules.
