= Saint Enda's Park =

Public park with museum in Dublin, Ireland

Coordinates: 53.284079°N 6.282681°W

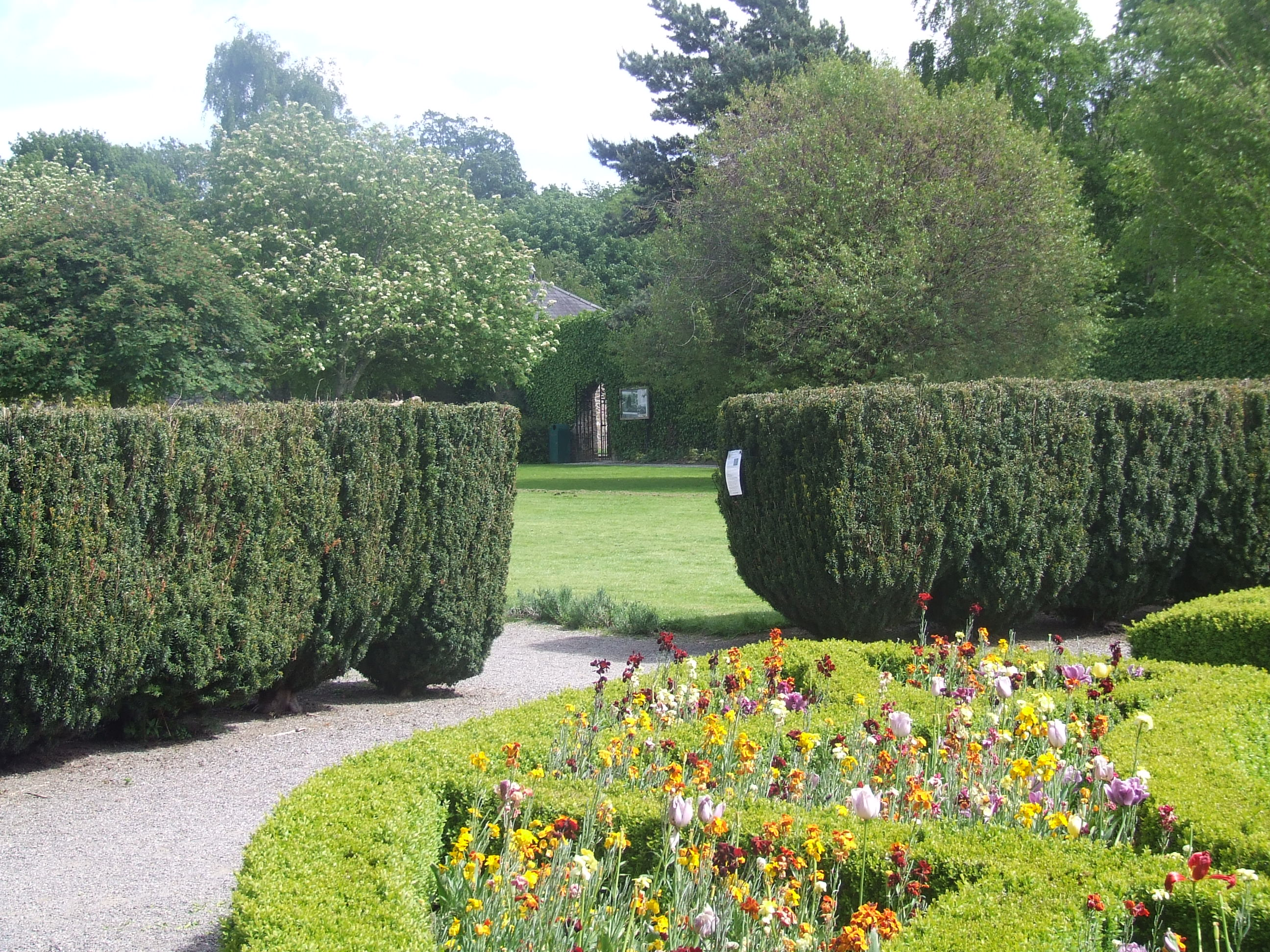
Formal garden alongside the Pearse Museum

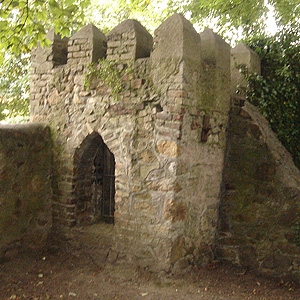
Watch tower in St Enda's Park

St. Enda's Park (Irish: Páirc Naomh Éanna) is a mid-size public park in Rathfarnham, Dublin, Ireland. The park, which is approximately 20 hectares (49.4 acres) in size, contains the Pearse Museum and a café. It is held by the Irish state, and managed by the Office of Public Works.

== History ==
St. Enda's was previously a private residence, and then a school. The property began as The Hermitage, the home of Dublin dentist Edward Hudson. The main house was built in 1760. The property was taken over by Patrick Pearse, later one of the leaders of the Easter Rising of 1916, and he ran a school there, St. Enda's School (or Scoil Éanna in Irish). Pearse, who was a teacher, bought the building in 1910 as his school in Ranelagh was getting too small. Pearse considered the site "ideal" as his curriculum had a heavy emphasis on nature. In the school, his brother, Willie Pearse, taught art and his sister Mary taught Irish. The Irish poets, Joseph Plunkett and Thomas MacDonagh also taught at the school. Both were executed after the 1916 Rising, as were 15 former pupils of the school.

Leading up to the 1916 rising, the basement of the school was used as a bomb factory by Desmond Ryan and Liam Bulfin, both Irish Republican Brotherhood members. On Easter Monday, 1916, Padraig Pearse left the school for the last time and made the 5-mile march to the GPO.

British forces occupied the Hermitage after the Rising until 1919, when the school was opened once more by Margaret Pearse and her daughter Margaret Mary Pearse. The school closed its doors in 1935 due to a lack of support. When Margaret Pearse died in 1932, she wished that the building would be given over to the state after the lifetime of her daughter, Margaret Mary. She made only two conditions, that the house would be open throughout the year (even on Christmas Day) and that entry would be free of charge for the public.

== Pearse Museum ==
The Hermitage is now the Pearse Museum dedicated to the memory of Patrick Pearse, the Pearse family, and their school, and is the museum and park are open to the public all year round. There are a number of 18th and 19th century follies and garden buildings within the park.

== Events ==
Between May and August, the park is open between 9am and 9pm. Every Sunday from June to August, there is music entertainment in the courtyard beside the Pearse Building.
