= Richard Moore (Irish lawyer) =

Irish lawyer and judge

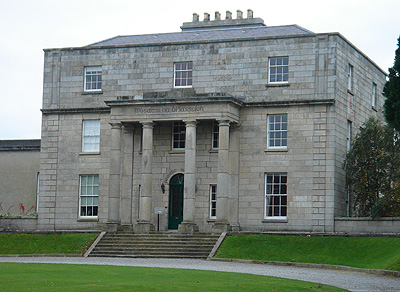
The Hermitage, Moore's house from 1840 to 1857, later St Enda's School and now the Pearse Museum

Richard Moore PC (1783 – 31 December 1857) was an Irish lawyer and judge.

== Background ==
He was born in Barne, near Clonmel, County Tipperary, second son of Stephen Moore of Salisbury House, and his wife and cousin Salisbury Moore. The Moores of Clonmel were a junior branch of the landowning family whose senior branch acquired the title Earl Mount Cashell. Richard himself, though he lived mainly in Dublin, owned some property in Tipperary. Stephen Moore (1836–1897), MP for County Tipperary from 1875 to 1880, was his great-nephew.

== Family ==
Richard married firstly Frances Bligh, daughter of the Reverend Thomas Bligh, by whom he had a son, Richard Moore junior of Killashee House, Naas, County Kildare; and secondly in 1824 Wilhelmina Westby (died 1860), youngest daughter of William Westby of Thornhill, County Dublin and his first wife Mary Fletcher of Tottenham, by who he had a son, William Westby Moore of Hampshire, and a daughter Frances, who died unmarried in her late twenties.

== Early career ==
He was educated at Trinity College Dublin, where he took his Bachelor of Arts degree in 1803, entered the Middle Temple in 1804, was called to the Irish Bar in 1806 and became King's Counsel in 1827. He became Third Serjeant, a Bencher of the King's Inn, and Solicitor General for Ireland in 1840. Though he supported the Liberals, Elrington Ball states that he was not much interested in politics.

== Later career ==
Moore was Attorney-General for Ireland in Lord John Russell's ministry, holding that office from 16 July 1846 to 21 December 1847. He was then appointed as a judge of the Court of Queen's Bench (Ireland) and remained a judge until his death.

He was one of the Special Commission judges appointed for the trial in which William Smith O'Brien was convicted of high treason for his part in the Young Irelander Rebellion of 1848 (The Queen v O'Brien (1849) 3 Cox CC 360). O'Brien's death sentence was commuted to one of transportation and he received an unconditional pardon in 1856, after which he returned to Ireland.

== Reputation ==
Ball states that Moore was universally respected for his legal ability, notwithstanding a certain modesty and diffidence about his own talents. An anonymous pamphlet from 1850, which was critical of many members of the Irish Bench, had high praise for Moore's intellect.

== St. Enda's School ==
From 1840 until his death Moore lived mainly in Rathfarnham, Dublin. His house, "The Hermitage", later became famous as St. Enda's School, the secondary school for boys founded by Padraic Pearse. Moore's heirs sold the house in 1859. The house and grounds have been owned by the State since 1968 and the house is now the Pearse Museum

Legal offices
Preceded by David Richard Pigot	Solicitor-General for Ireland; 1840–1841	Succeeded by Edward Pennefather
Preceded by Richard Wilson Greene	Attorney-General for Ireland; 1846–1847	Succeeded by James Henry Monahan
