= Pearse Museum =

- Músaem na bPiarsach

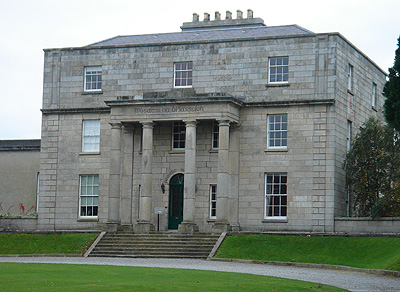
- Northern facade

- Location within Dublin
- Former name: The Hermitage, St. Enda's School
- Established: 1979
- Location: St. Enda's Park, Grange Road, Rathfarnham, Dublin, Ireland
- Coordinates: 53.2829°N 6.2816°W
- Type: Biographical museum
- Curator: Brian Crowley
- Owner: Office of Public Works
- Public transit access: Grange Road (Hermitage Avenue) bus stop (Dublin Bus route 16)
- Parking: On-site
- Website: heritageireland.ie/places-to-visit/pearse-museum-st-endas-park/

The Pearse Museum (Irish: Músaem na bPiarsach) is dedicated to the memory of Patrick Pearse and his brother, William. Patrick Pearse was an educationalist and nationalist who was executed for his part in the 1916 Rising. The museum is situated in St. Enda's Park in the suburb of Rathfarnham on the south side of Dublin, Ireland. It was formerly an Irish speaking school named St. Enda's. Originally Pearse's school was set up in Ranelagh on 8 September 1908. It moved to Rathfarnham in 1910. After Pearse was executed for his part take in the 1916 rising, and due to decreasing numbers and increasing financial worries, the school closed in 1935. After Patrick Pearse's sister (Margaret Mary Pearse) died in 1968, St. Enda's and its grounds were handed over to the state, and the school house is now a museum devoted to the Pearse brothers. The museum contains reconstructions of many of the original rooms, including Pearse's study, the family sitting room, the school art gallery, the school museum and one of the dormitories. There is also a gallery devoted exclusively to the sculpture of William Pearse. Visitors can also visit a nature study room in the courtyard behind the school house where examples of Irish plants and animals can be found.

The museum is located in an 18th-century house with extensive parkland gardens built around 1786 originally built as the home of famous dentist Edward Hudson which he named The Hermitage.

Later from 1840 to 1857 it was the home of Richard Moore, Attorney General for Ireland and judge.

The museum was closed for renovations in May 2006 and re-opened to the public on 28 November 2008. The museum is open seven days a week and admission is free.

== Gallery ==
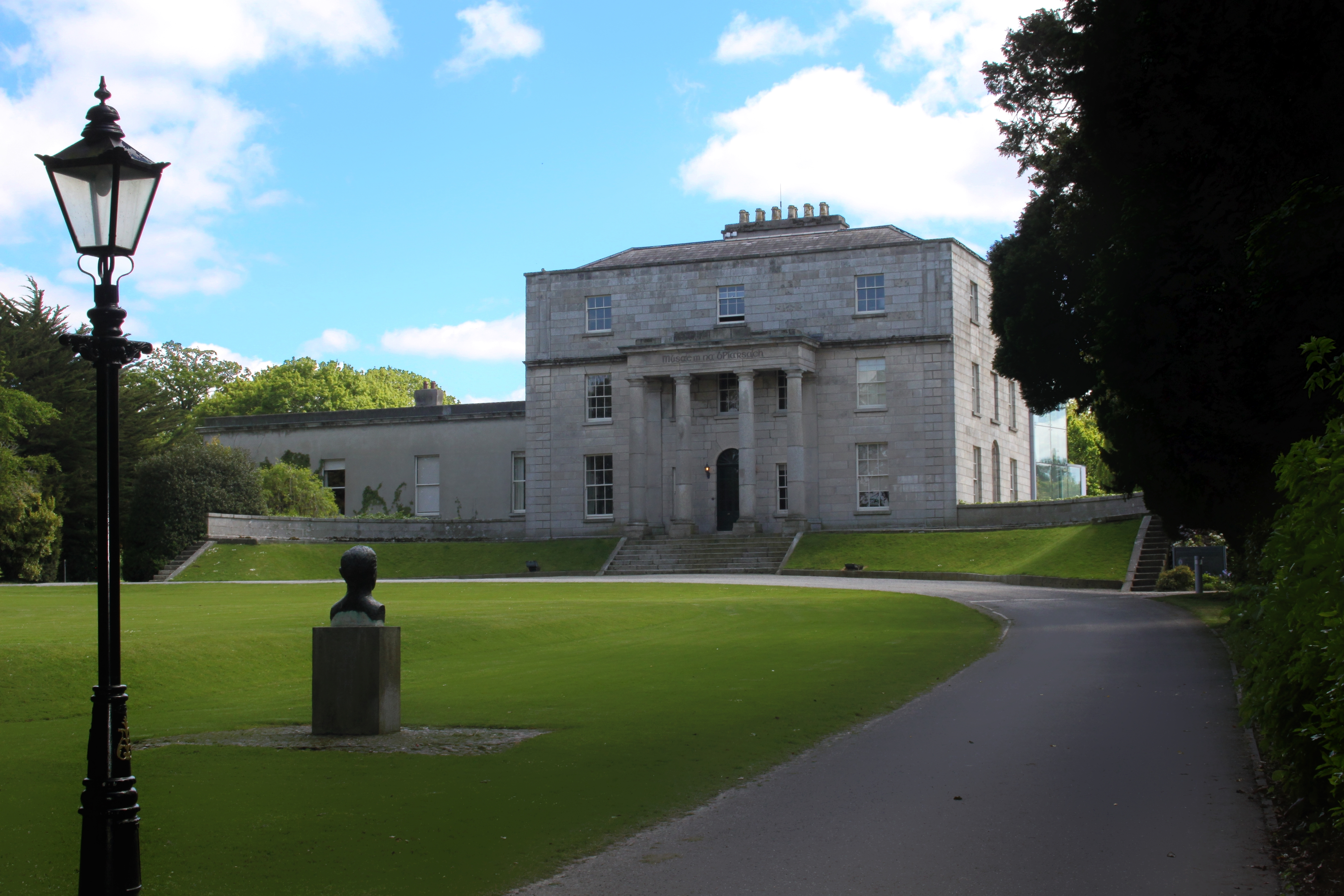
General view

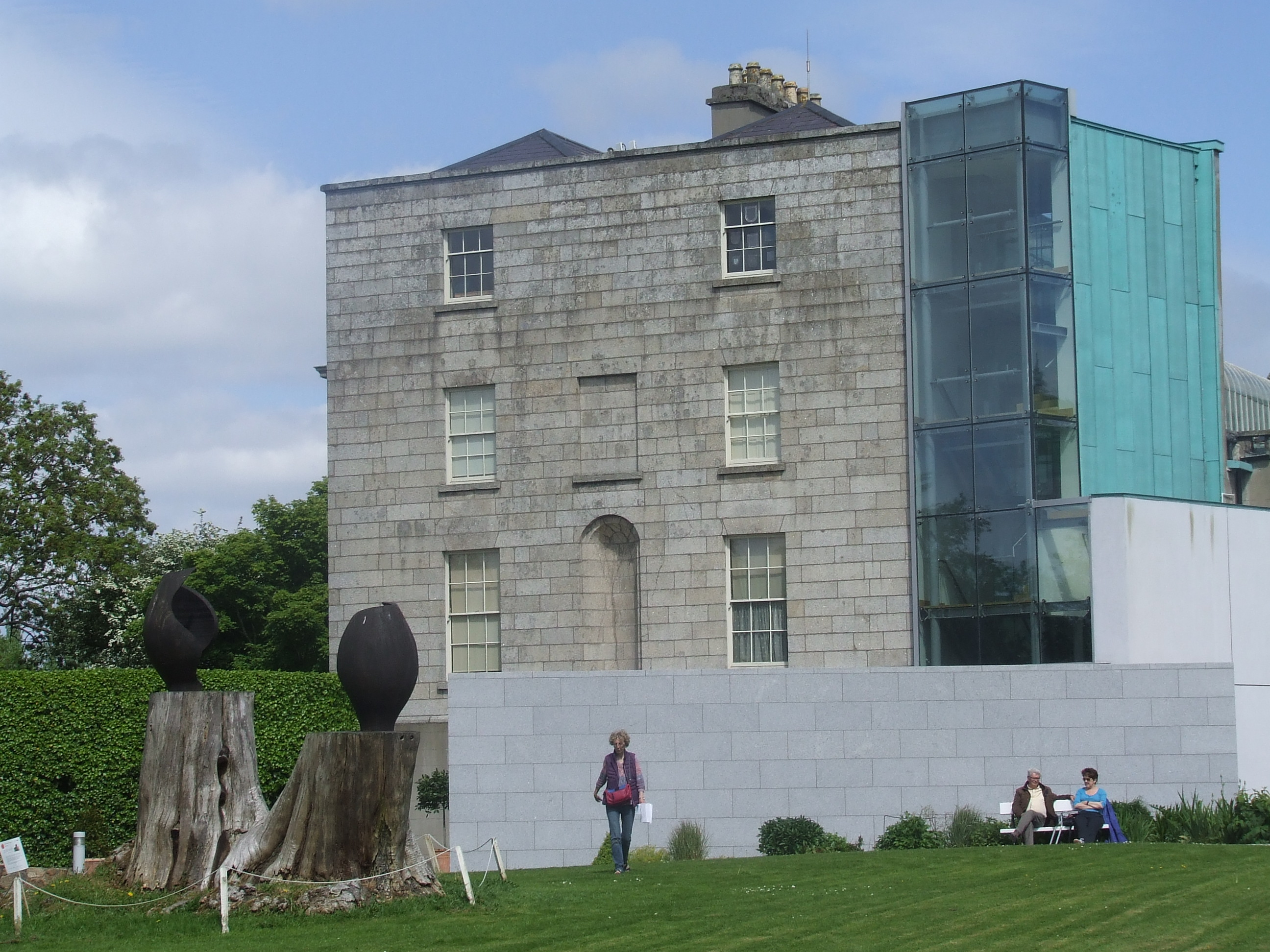
Pearse Museum, western elevation. Entrance to museum behind modern walls

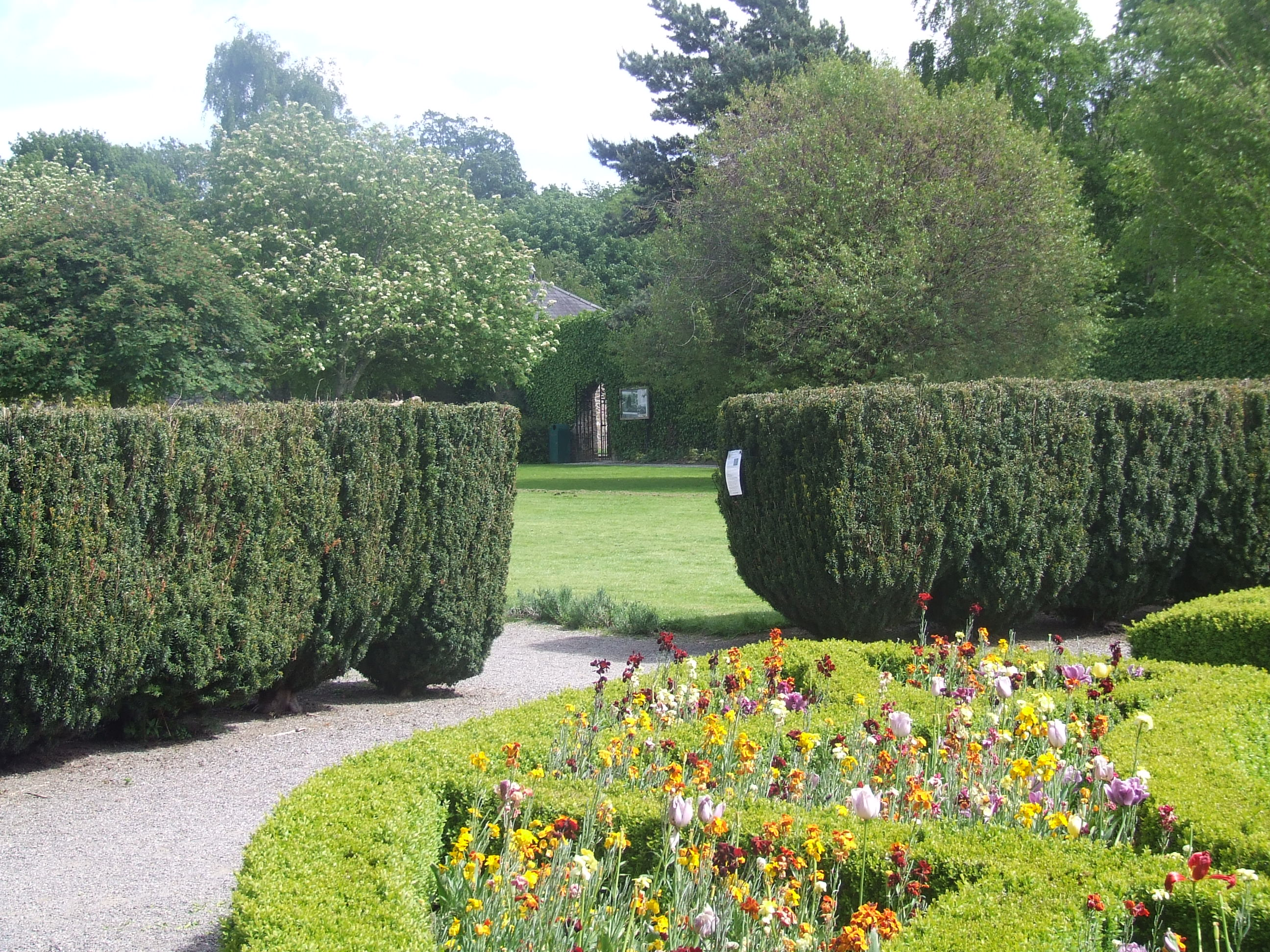
Formal garden of the Pearse Museum
