= Rathfarnham =

Suburb of Dublin, Ireland

Rathfarnham Ráth Fearnáin (Irish)
- Suburb
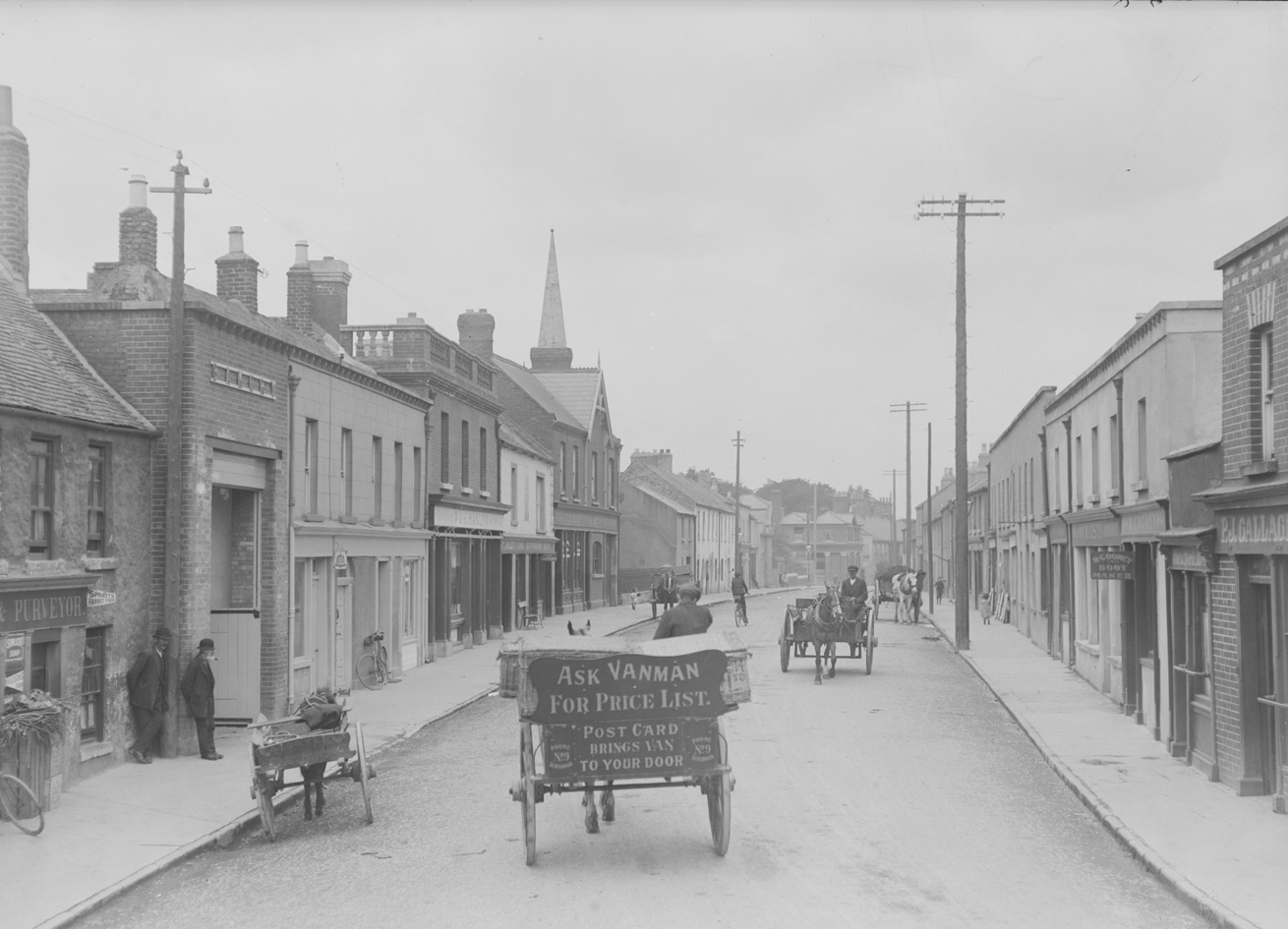
- Main Street in Rathfarnham, circa 1905

- Location in Dublin Rathfarnham (Ireland)
- Coordinates: 53°17′56″N 6°17′08″W
- Country: Ireland
- Province: Leinster
- County: County Dublin
- Local government areas: South Dublin, Dún Laoghaire–Rathdown
- Elevation: 54 m (177 ft)

Population (2022)
  - Electoral divisions: 23,276
- Time zone: UTC±0 (WET)
  - Summer (DST): UTC+1 (IST)
- Eircode routing key: D14, D16
- Area code: 01 (+3531)
- Irish Grid Reference: O144289
- Website: www.rathfarnham.com

Rathfarnham (Irish: Ráth Fearnáin, meaning 'Fearnán's ringfort') is a southside suburb of Dublin, Ireland. It is south of Terenure, east of Templeogue, west of Churchtown, and is in the postal districts of Dublin 14 and Dublin 16. It is between the local government areas of Dún Laoghaire–Rathdown and South Dublin.

Located within the historical baronies of Rathdown and Uppercross, Rathfarnham village originally developed around a fortification overlooking a ford on the River Dodder. From the medieval period, Rathfarnham was on the perimeter of the Pale (the area of Anglo-Norman influence in Ireland, centred on Dublin), and a number of defensive structures were built in the area. Rathfarnham Castle, a fortified house, was built in the late 16th century. Developed around these structures, by the 19th century there were a number of mills operating in the area, and Rathfarnham was still somewhat rural by the early 20th century. During the 20th century, with the expansion of metropolitan Dublin, Rathfarnham became a largely residential suburban area.

The population of all electoral divisions labelled as Rathfarnham was 23,276 as of the 2022 census.

== Location ==
Rathfarnham is a civil parish in the historical baronies of Rathdown and Uppercross. The civil parish contains 11 townlands. Historical sites in Rathfarnham's townlands include: Kilmashogue, Mount Venus, Tibradden and Taylors Grange. A broad definition of Rathfarnham also includes the suburban areas of Nutgrove, Ballyboden, Whitechurch and Ballyroan.

== History ==
=== Early and medieval history ===
The name Rathfarnham (from Irish Ráth Fearnáin, meaning 'fort of Fearnán' or 'fort of the alders') suggests an earlier habitation, but no remains of prehistoric fortifications, burial places, early churches or old records have been found.

The written history of Rathfarnham begins after the Norman invasion of Ireland. Terenure and Kimmage (Cheming), both described as being in Rathfranham [sic] parish Dublin, are mentioned in an 1175 grant by Henry II to Walter the goldsmith ('Aurifaber') held at Canterbury Cathedral Archives.

In 1199, these lands were granted to Milo le Bret, and he adapted an existing ridge to build a motte and bailey fort at what is now the start of the Braemor Road. Le Bret later established a more permanent fortified settlement on the site of the (later) Rathfarnham Castle and a village grew up around it on a site overlooking a ford over the River Dodder.

In the 13th century, no events of great importance are recorded at Rathfarnham. While, at this time, the area was protected on its south side by the Royal Forest of Glencree (and its wardens), Rathfarnham became more exposed to an attack when this deer park was overrun by the Clan O'Toole from the Wicklow Mountains in the 14th century.

Located on the perimeter of the Pale (the area around Dublin under greater English control), when the English presence began to shrink after the 14th century, Rathfarnham "came to be on the front lines" and a number of defensive structures were built to protect the area from incursions by Gaelic Irish families.

=== From the 16th century ===
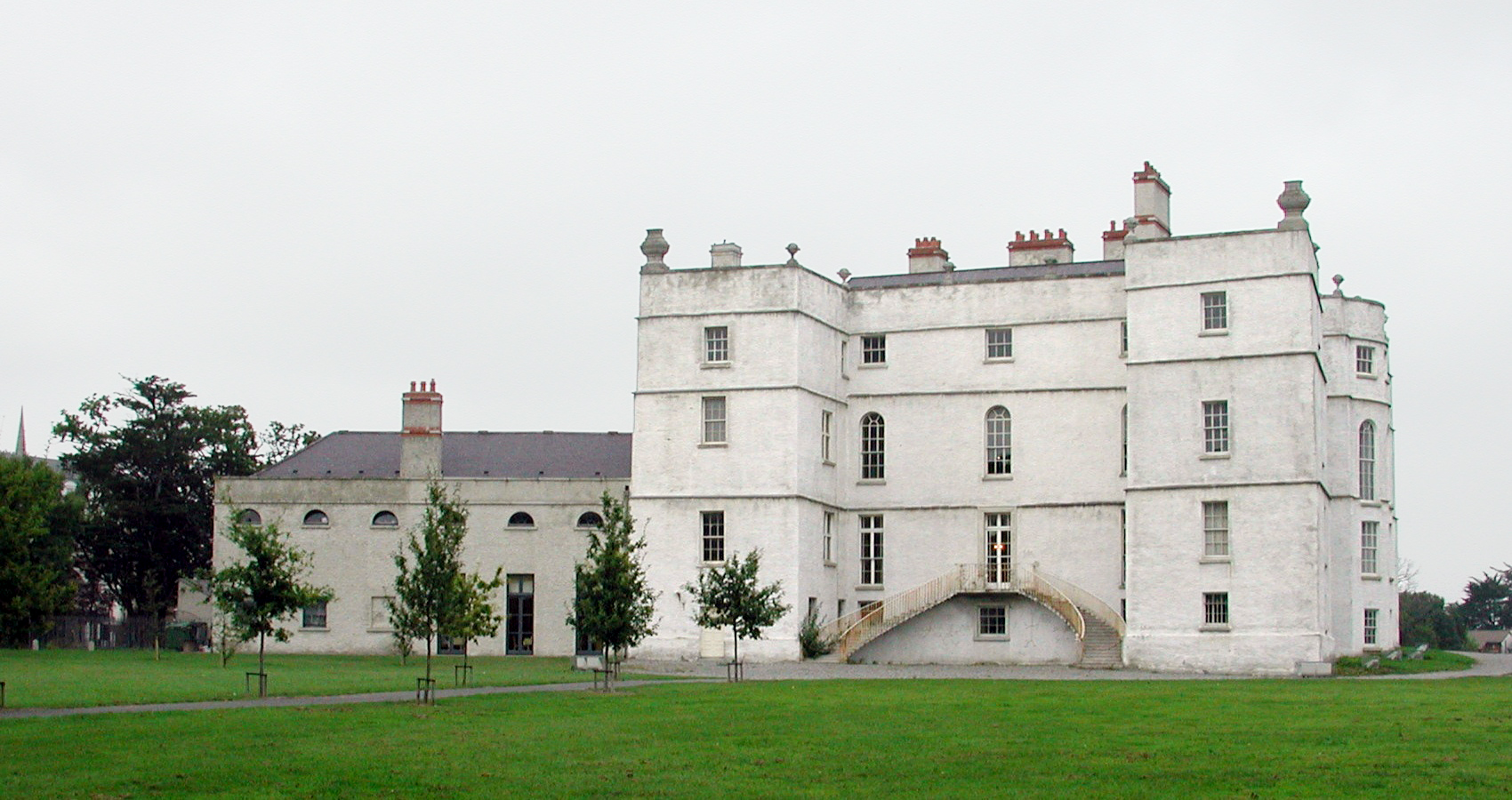
Rathfarnham Castle was built in the 16th century

The site of Rathfarnham Castle, and much of the land around Rathfarnham, belonged to the Eustace family, Viscounts of Baltinglass. However, their property was confiscated, from James Eustace, 3rd Viscount Baltinglass, for his support of the Second Desmond Rebellion of 1579–1583. The Eustace lands at Rathfarnham were then granted to the Loftus family, who built a fortified house on the site of an earlier structure.

In the 1640s, the Loftus family was at the centre of the Irish Confederate Wars arising out of the Irish Rebellion of 1641. In 1649, the castle was seized by the Earl of Ormonde's Catholic and Royalist forces before the Battle of Rathmines. However, they were granted it back by the English parliamentarians after their victory in that battle.

Economic activity in Rathfarnham was stepped up in the 17th century, and the village was granted a patent in 1618 to hold horse and cattle fairs. From the early 18th century a number of gentlemen's residences were developed, including the remodelling of Rathfarnham Castle and the construction of Ashfield.

==== Rathfarnham Castle ====
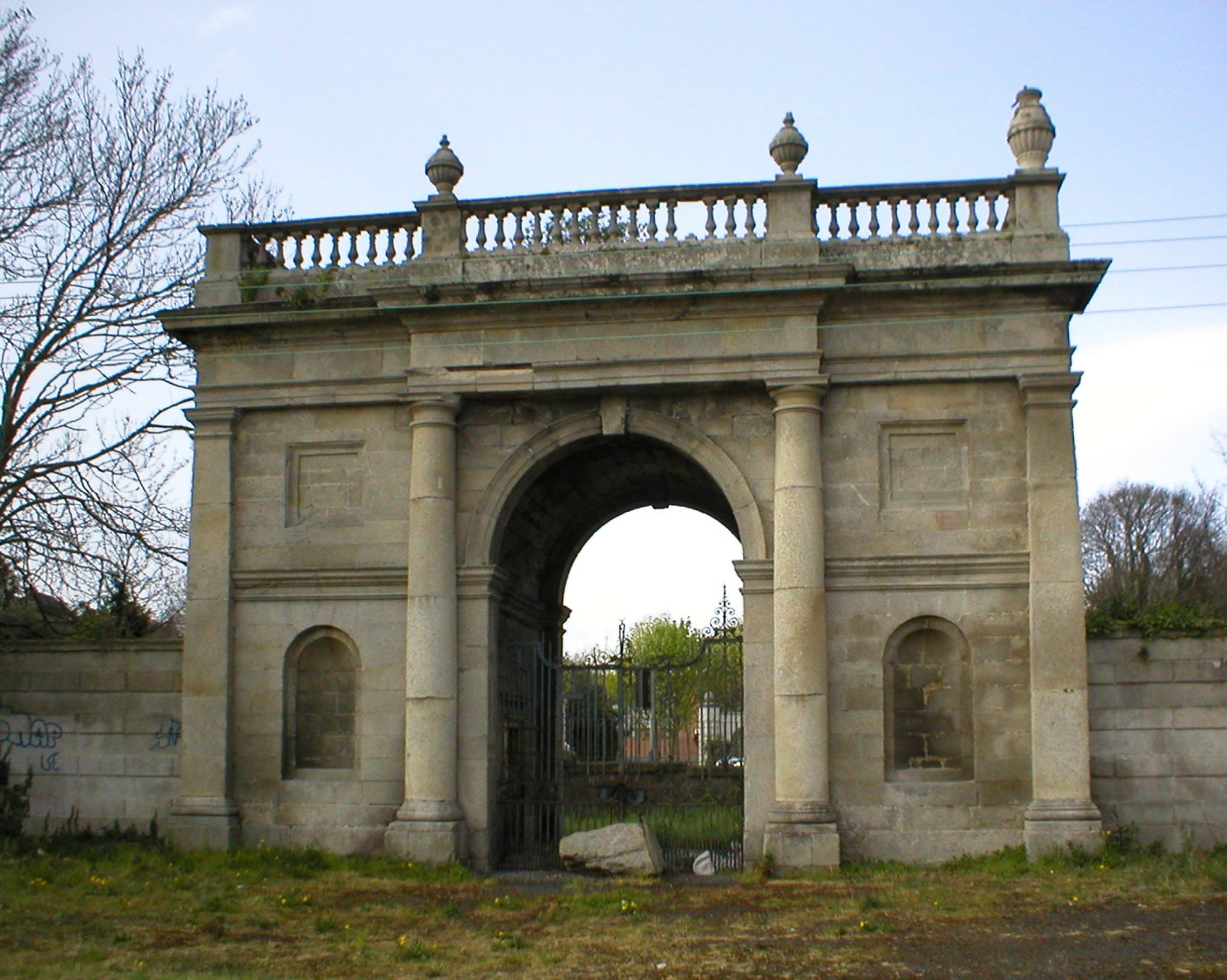
Ely's Arch

Rathfarnham Castle itself was re-modelled from a defensively focused fortified house into a more comfortable stately home. Lower Dodder Road is still marked by a triumphal arch, from this era, which originally led to the castle. The erection of this gateway is attributed to Henry Loftus, Earl of Ely from 1769 to 1783 who was also responsible for the classical work on the castle itself. The arch is named the "new gate" on Richard Frizell's map of 1779. After the division of the estate in 1913, the arch became the entrance to the Castle Golf Club but was later abandoned in favour of the more direct Woodside Drive entrance.

==== Ashfield ====
Ashfield, the next house on the same side, was occupied during the 18th century by Protestant clergy. In the early part of the 19th century, it became the home of Sir William Cusac Smith, Baron of the Exchequer and from 1841 of the Tottenham family who continued in residence until 1913. After this the Brooks of Brooks Thomas Ltd. occupied it until the 1990s when the estate was divided up and houses built along the main road. The local historian Patrick Healy notes that "a new road was later built along the side of the house and named Brookvale after the last occupants".

=== Industrial revolution ===
New industries, especially the production of paper, developed on the Owendoher and Dodder rivers, and many mills were erected during the 18th and 19th centuries. During the 19th century, a number of them switched to cotton and wool and later were converted to flour mills. The introduction of steam engines marked the end of this era and replaced the need for mills. Many of the old buildings fell into disrepair and were demolished, and their millraces filled in.

A millpond and extensive mill buildings formerly occupied the low-lying fields on the west side of the main Rathfarnham road, just beside the bridge. On a map by Frizell dated 1779, it is called the "Widow Clifford's mill and mill holding" and in 1843 it is named the "Ely Cloth Factory". A Mr Murray then owned it but in 1850, it passed into the hands of Mr Nickson who converted it into a flour mill. His family continued in occupation until 1875 when John Lennox took over. This mill closed down in 1880 and the buildings were demolished.

=== Historical features ===
==== R115 road ====
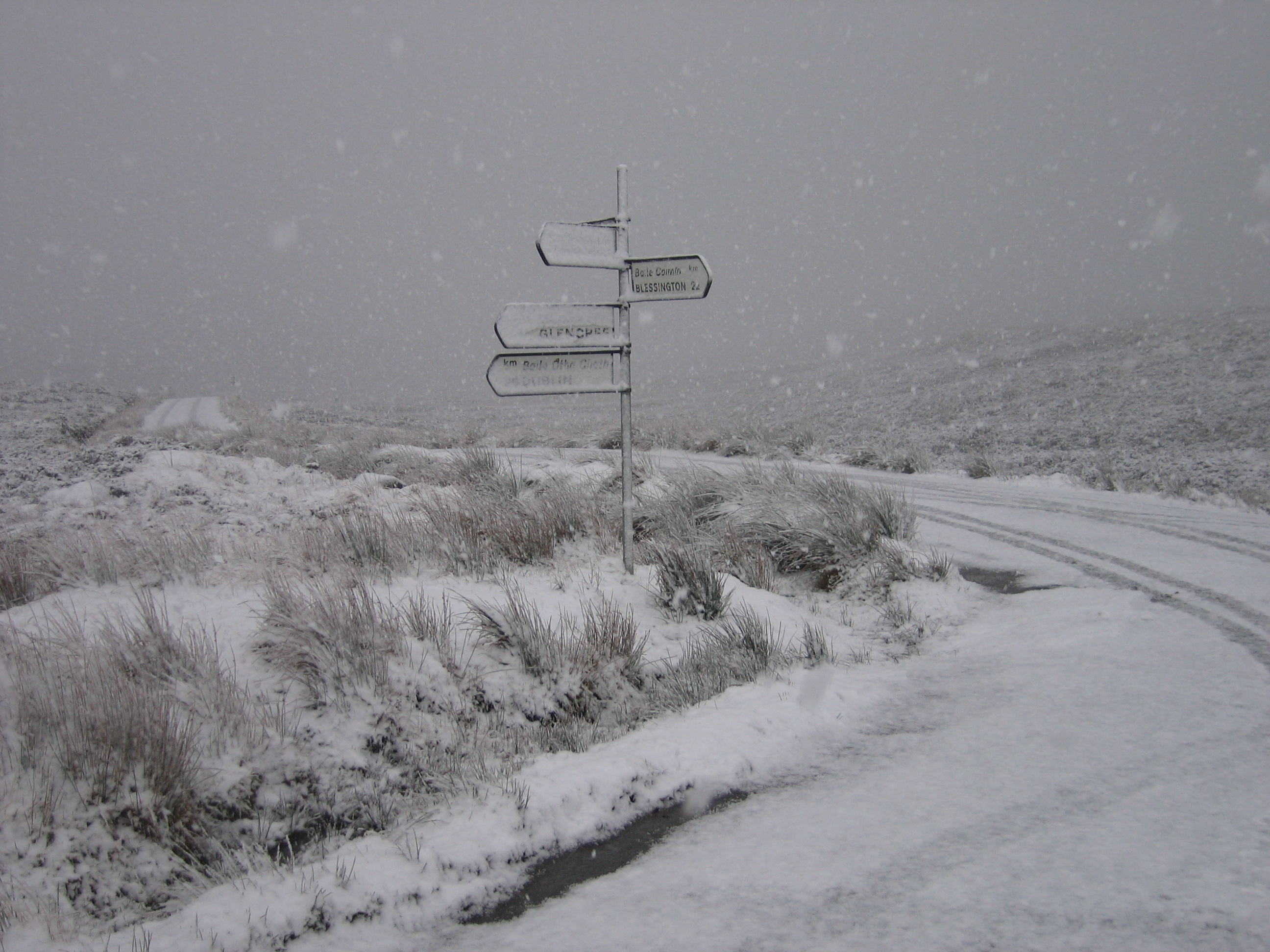
The Military Road at the Sally Gap

Rathfarnham contains the start of the R115 road. The road, constructed through the Wicklow Mountains, was built to assist Crown forces in tracking down United Irishmen insurgents who were hiding in the Wicklow Mountains following the Irish Rebellion of 1798. Rathfarnham itself was the scene of a number skirmishes in the early days of the rebellion between the United Irishmen and government forces. Construction of the road commenced in August 1800 and was completed in October 1809. The road starts outside the Yellow House pub in Rathfarnham, passes the head of Glencree, with a spur down that valley to Enniskerry, rises to the Sally Gap and then dips down to Laragh, over the hills into Glenmalure, and finishes at Aghavannagh. The 34-mile long road was constructed under the guidance of the engineer Alexander Taylor (born in 1746).

==== Rathfarnham Road ====
According to local historian Patrick Healy (2005), "many writers" suggest that the road to Rathfarnham "follows the same route as the Slíghe Chualann, the ancient highway, which in the time of St. Patrick was used by travellers from Dublin to Wicklow and Wexford". This road is believed to have crossed the Dodder at the Big Bridge, now Pearse Bridge, and re-crossed it again near Oldbawn. The first record of a bridge being built here was in 1381 and, in 1652, it was described by Gerard Boate in his A Natural History of Ireland as a wooden bridge which "though it be high and strong nevertheless hath several times been quite broke and carried away through the violence of sudden floods". After three bridges had been demolished by the river, between 1728 and 1765, the present structure of a single stone arch was erected in 1765. This bridge was widened on the west side in 1953 when it was renamed in commemoration of Patrick Pearse and William Pearse.

In 1912, during the construction of a main drainage scheme to Rathfarnham, a stone causeway was uncovered 23 ft (7.0 m) below the road level. It was 9 ft (2.7 m) wide and built of large blocks crossing the course of the river. Cut into the surface of the stone were a number of deep parallel grooves, as from the action of wheeled traffic over a long period. This was taken as evidence of the existence of a busy thoroughfare even before the construction of the earliest bridge.

==== Old graveyard ====
Next to Ashfield is the old graveyard containing the ruins of a church that was dedicated to Saint Peter and Saint Paul. This was a medieval church used for Protestant worship until 1795, when it was found to be too small for the congregation and a new one was erected nearby. The end walls of the old church still stand, the west gable containing a bell turret and the east pierced by a chancel arch, however, the chancel itself has disappeared. The north wall is gone and all that remains of the south wall is an arched opening.

Near the entrance to the burial ground is the grave of Captain James Kelly. Kelly, who was associated with the Fenian Rising of 1867, was the Fenian organiser for the Rathfarnham district and was known in the area as 'The Knight of Glendoo'. On one occasion when he was on the run he was hiding in the cellar of his business premises in Wicklow Street when police raided it. An employee named James Fitzpatrick who strongly resembled Capt. Kelly in appearance was arrested in error and was tried and sentenced to six months imprisonment, which he served without betraying his identity. Capt. Kelly died on 8 March 1915, aged 70.

On the opposite side of the road are Crannagh Park and Road, Rathfarnham Park and Ballytore Road, all built on part of the old Rathfarnham Estate. In the garden of a house formerly named Tower Court in Crannagh Road is a circular pigeon house, a relic of Lord Ely's occupation of Rathfarnham Castle. The entrance to this structure is by a low door on a level with the ground and the inside is lined from floor to roof with holes for the pigeons. A later floor was inserted halfway up, so as to make two rooms, and a second door was broken through the wall at that level.

==== Rathfarnham village ====
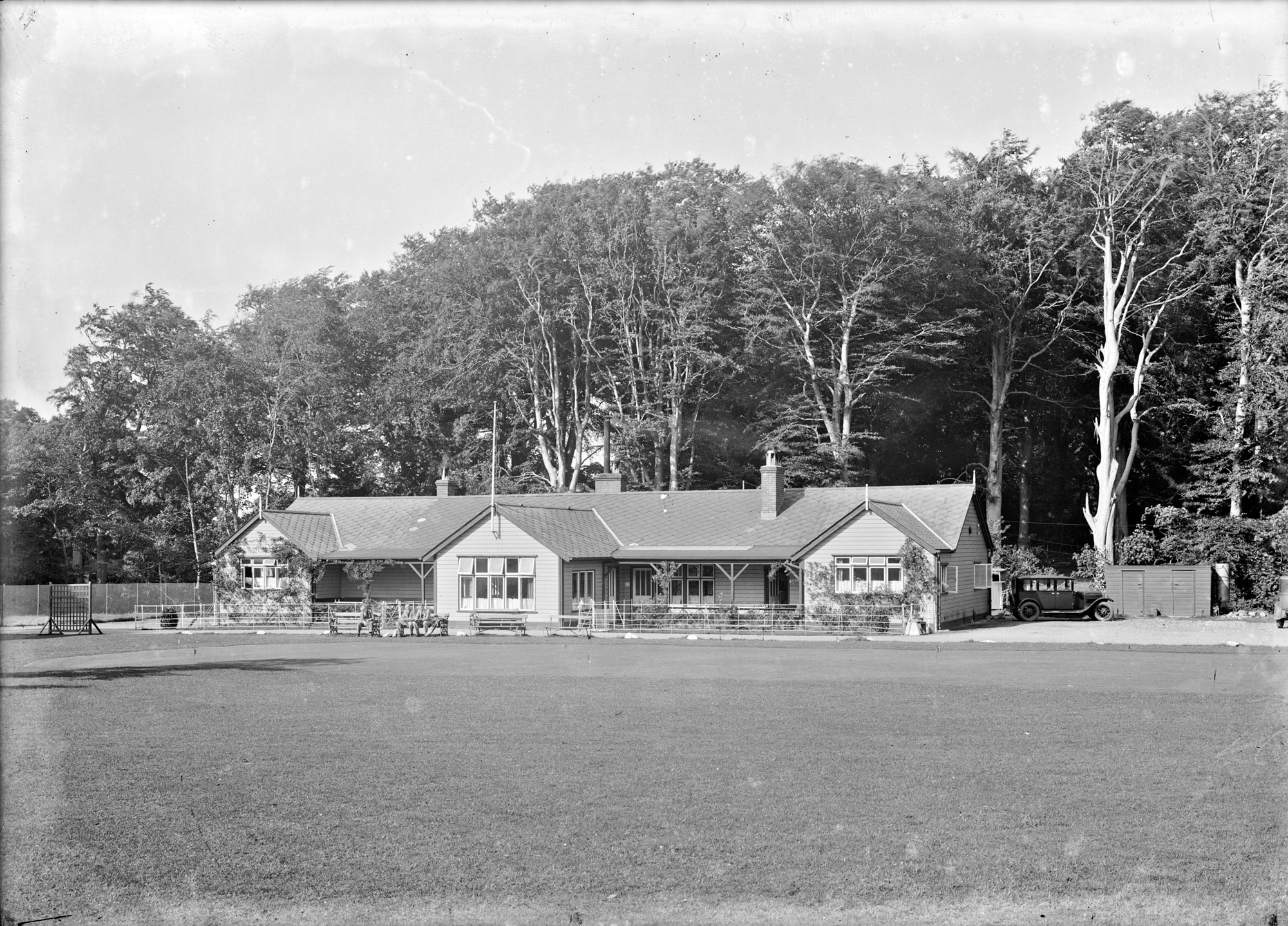
Grange Golf Club in the early 20th century

In the castle grounds were several fish ponds which were supplied by a mill race taken from the stream which rises up at Kilmashogue and flows down through Grange Golf Club and Saint Enda's Park. This served several mills before entering the fish ponds, whence it ran through the golf links while a smaller branch was conducted under the road to the flour mills which stood at the corner of Butterfield Lane, on the site later occupied by Borgward Hansa Motors Ltd. Described in 1836 as Sweetman's Flour Mills, it frequently changed hands before closing down in 1887. It was later operated as a sawmill.

The Protestant parish church, on Rathfarnham's Main Street, was built in 1795 to replace the church in the old graveyard. Beside the church is the old schoolhouse that dates from early in the 19th century. Immediately adjoining is Church Lane at the corner of which is a bank built on the site of a Royal Irish Constabulary barracks that was burned down by Anti-Treaty IRA forces in September 1922 during the Irish Civil War. In the lane is an old blocked-up doorway of an early 18-century type. Church Lane leads to Woodview cottages, which are built partly on the site of an old paper mill. The mill race previously mentioned passed under Butterfield Lane to the paper mill and continued on below Ashfield to turn the wheel of the Ely Cloth Factory. It was later turned into the Owen Doher River at Woodview Cottages. According to the local historian, Patrick Healy, "when the new road was made to Templeogue the old mill race could still be traced through the grounds of Ashfield where its dry bed was still spanned by several stone bridges".

The paper mill, of which some old walls and brick arches still survive, has been described as the oldest in Ireland but there does not appear to be any evidence to support this. The earliest reference to a paper mill here is 1719 when William Lake of Rathfarnham presented a petition for financial aid but we hear of one at Milltown as far back as 1694. In 1751, William and Thomas Slater, whose works were destroyed by fire in 1775, made paper here. Archer's survey of 1801 mentions two paper mills here, Freemans and Teelings, and both Dalton in 1836 and Samuel Lewis in 1837 state that one paper mill was still working and from 1836 to 1839 the name Henry Hayes, Rathfarnham Mill appears in the directories. If this can be identified with the mill at Woodview cottages it must have become idle soon afterwards as it is designated "Old Mill" on the 1843 edition of the O.S. map. Healy (2005) notes that, in 1854, "when this mill had neither water wheel nor machinery, an attempt was made to re-open it for the manufacture of paper but it came to nothing". The millrace was subsequently completely removed to make way for a housing development.

At the end of the main street, on the right, the road to Lower Rathfarnham passes the site of the earliest constabulary barracks. This closed down in 1890 when the establishment was transferred to a house named Leighton Lodge near Loreto Abbey.

==== Rathfarnham Lower ====
The Catholic Church of the Annunciation was erected in 1878 to replace the old chapel on Willbrook Road. Outside the church door is a primitive type of font on a pedestal bearing the inscription FONT USED IN MASS HOUSE OF PENAL TIMES IN PARISH OF RATHFARNHAM FROM 1732. According to the local historian, Patrick Healy, the "appearance of this font would suggest that it was originally a stone bullaun and dated to a period much earlier than the penal times".

On the opposite corner is the well-known Yellow House, a licensed premises built near the site of an inn of the same name which is marked on Taylor's map of 1816. (The Catholic Church of the Annunciation (see above) is on the site of the original Yellow House). A tradition has been recorded by Mr Hammond that in 1798 a Michael Eades, who sheltered wanted men in his house, owned it. It was also frequented by the soldiers of the Rathfarnham Guard whose careless talk was carefully noted by the United Irishmen hiding on the premises. In 1804, when the truth came to be known, the same military wrecked the place. Following Wilbrook road down between the Yellow House and the Annunciation, a large set of wrought iron gates can be observed. These gates, which now act as the pedestrian entrance to the Beaufort Downs housing estate, were originally the entrance to the Beaufort estate of the 18th century.

==== Nutgrove Avenue ====
A short distance past the church is Nutgrove Avenue, widened and extended during the 1960s to link up with Churchtown.

The previous tree-shaded Nutgrove Avenue, along with the adjoining narrow lanes and passages, was replaced. The former avenue was described by local historian Patrick Healy as having wound a "crooked course between Loreto Convent cemetery and the garden of Nutgrove House". A large gateway, which bore the inscription "Nutgrove School Established 1802", stood at the entrance to the avenue until c. 1911. The Nutgrove School closed in 1876 and the house became a private residence and was later used as the parish council headquarters.

The new Nutgrove Avenue was laid through the former school grounds and the house stood with its front against the footpath. The house, an eighteenth-century building containing a "fine stairs and coved ceilings with good plaster decoration", fell into disrepair and was demolished.

Weston St John Joyce, in his Neighbourhood of Dublin (1912), states that this house was at one time the dower house of Rathfarnham Castle. However Healy (2005) suggests that "in this he [Joyce] is almost certainly mistaken, as [Richard] Frizell's map of 1779 shows that it was outside the estate". Healy (2005) further suggests that Joyce may have confused the house with Ely Cottage, also known as Ely Lodge, which was on the opposite side of the avenue and shown on maps to be within the boundary of the estate.

==== Loreto Abbey ====
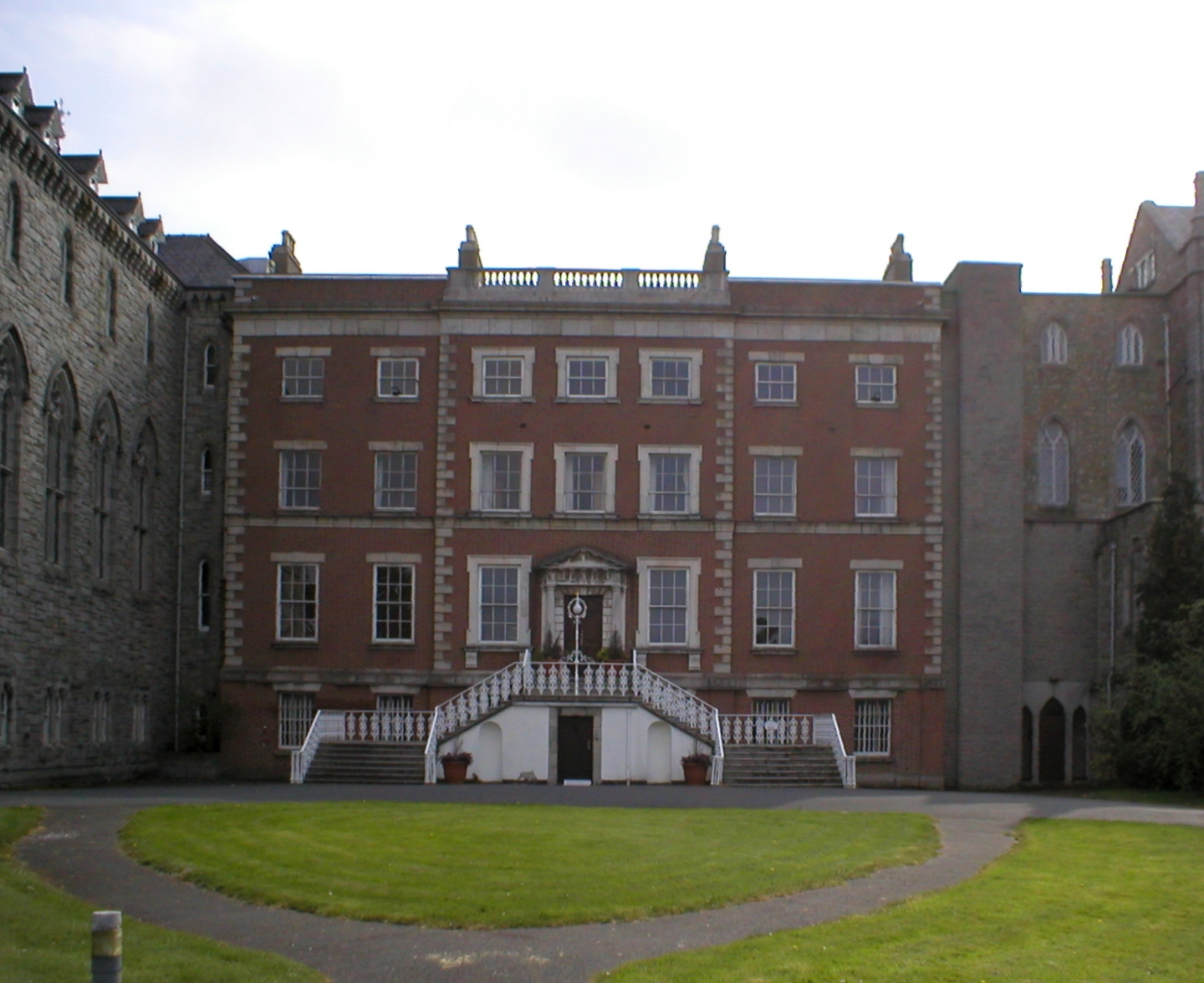
Rathfarnham House

Loreto Abbey in Lower Rathfarnham served as the headquarters of the Institute of the Blessed Virgin Mary. The mansion which now forms the centrepiece of the group was built by William Palliser about 1725. No expense was spared in its construction and decoration, and its interior includes polished mahogany and, in one room, embossed leather wallpaper. William Palliser died in 1768 without issue and Rathfarnham House passed to his cousin the Rev. John Palliser, who was rector of the parish.

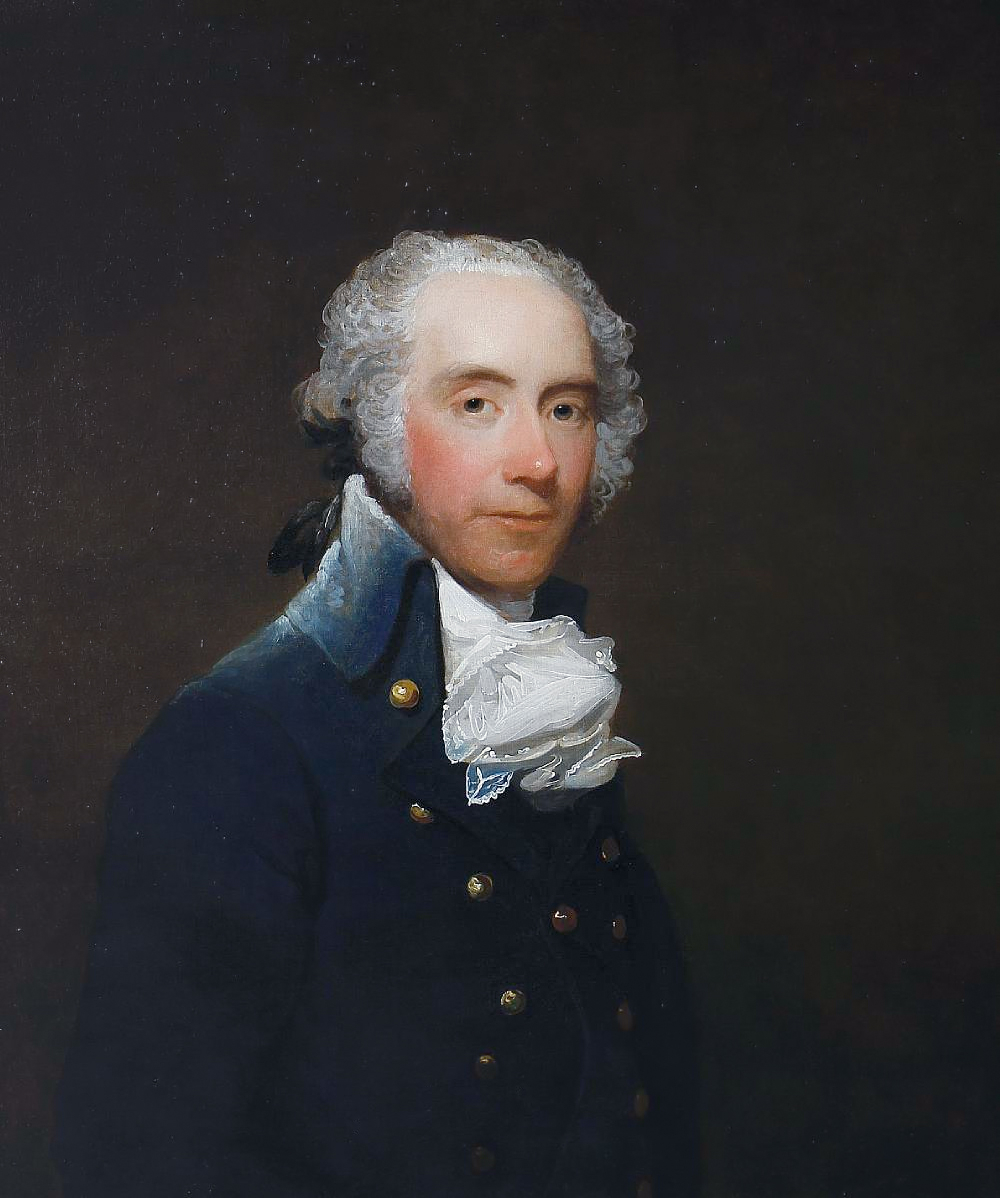
George Grierson (Gilbert Stuart)

After his death in 1795, the house was purchased by George Grierson, the King's Printer in Ireland, who resided here for a few years. When Grierson moved to his new abode in Woodtown in 1800 the house remained unoccupied until 1821, when it was purchased by the Most Rev. Dr Murray for the newly founded Loreto Order.

According to local historian Patrick Healy (2005), the "foundress Rev. Mother Mary Frances Teresa Ball made many improvements to the place". Additions have been made over the years, including a church (built in 1840), the novitiate (in 1863) and St Joseph's wing (built c. 1869) which contains the concert hall and refectory. St Anthony's wing was erected in 1896, St Francis Xavier's in 1903 and the Lisieux building in 1932 for the accommodation of visiting prelates to the Eucharistic Congress. In the 1920s, novice Agnes Bojaxhiu (later to become Mother Teresa) came to Loreto Abbey to learn English. This was the language the Sisters of Loreto used to teach school children in India.

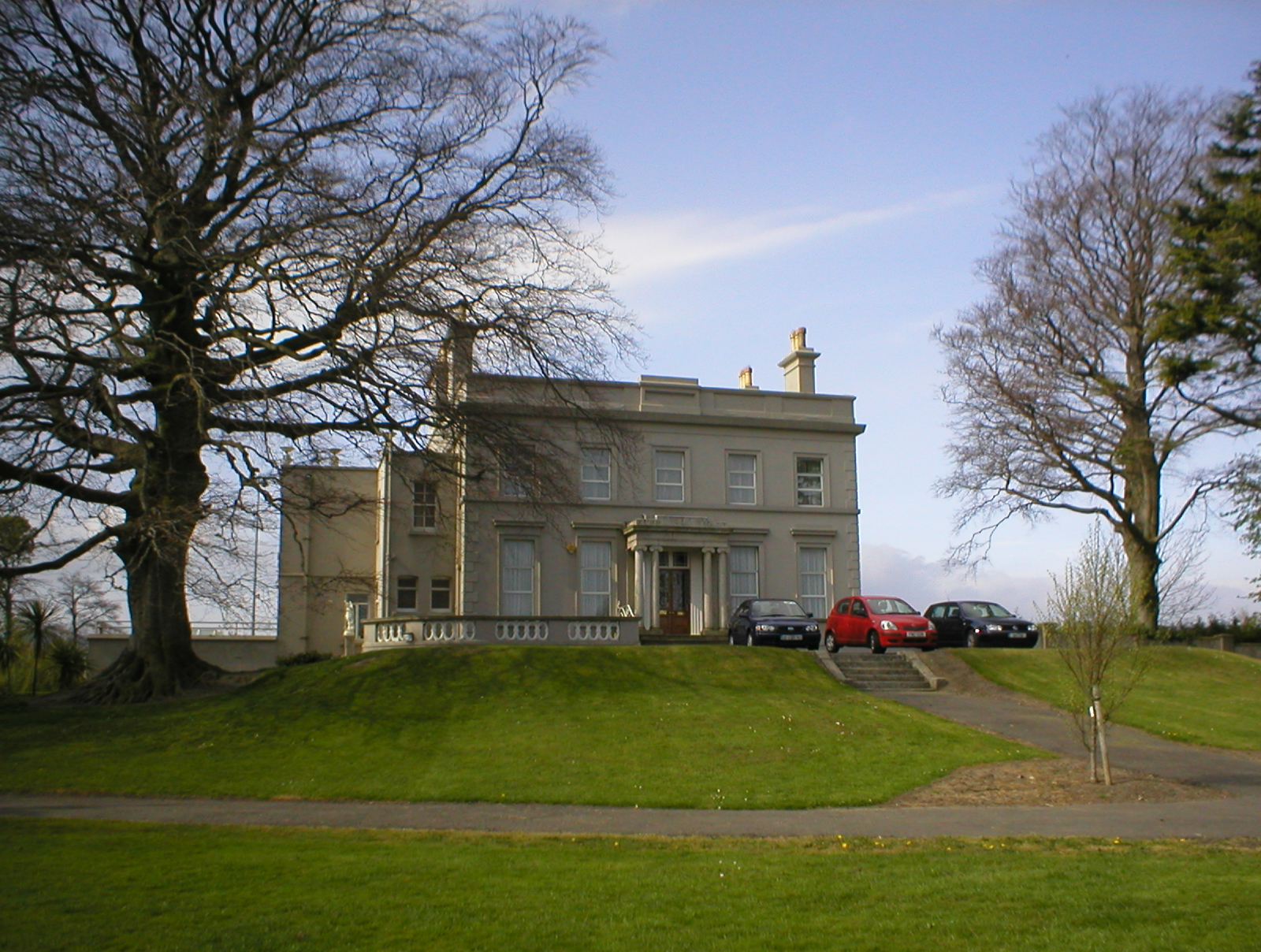
Beaufort House

Directly across the road from the Abbey is Beaufort House, which is now the headquarters of the Loreto Order in Ireland. This house was occupied by Robert Hodgens J.P. (1793–1860) and then by his sons, John Conlan Hodgens and Henry Hodgens. On the grounds is Loreto High School Beaufort which was founded in 1925.

==== The Ponds ====
Loreto Terrace on the north side of the abbey was formerly known as 'The Ponds', a name originating apparently from the large pond which previously occupied the low-lying field between Loreto Terrace and Nutgrove Avenue. This area was described in Weston St John Joyce's The Neighbourhood of Dublin in 1912 as "the dilapidated locality known as the Ponds" but it has since been largely rebuilt. The last of the old houses were demolished in the mid-1980s. It was a very early 18th-century gabled residence named Grove Cottage.

This place was the scene of a skirmish at the outbreak of the 1798 Rebellion. The insurgents of the south county assembled at the Ponds on 24 May 1798 under the leadership of David Keely, James Byrne, Edward Keogh and Ledwich. The latter two had been members of Lord Ely's yeomanry but had taken to the field with the United Irishmen. The insurgents were attacked by the local yeomanry corps but were able to defend themselves and the yeomanry was forced to retreat. A party of regular troops was then sent against them and a stiff encounter took place. A number of the insurgents were killed or wounded and some prisoners were taken including Keogh and Ledwich. The survivors retreated, joining up with a party from Clondalkin, and a further engagement took place at the turnpike on the Rathcoole road where the enemy was successfully repulsed.

==== Harold's Grange and Taylors Grange ====
The road to Harold's Grange continues southward from Loreto Abbey. The first site is Snugborough, which has its gable end to the road. The next is Washington Lodge, its 18th-century facade hidden by shrubbery. In later years new avenues have been laid out here on both sides of the road. Barton Drive, on the left, occupies the site of a house named Barton Lodge (occupied by William Conlan, a brewer in Dublin, until his death in 1829 - his daughter married into the local Hodgens family, who in the 1870s donated the lands for the Church of the Annunciation). On the other side is Silveracre, once the home of Dr Henthorn Todd, Professor of Hebrew in Trinity College, who was connected by marriage to the Hudson family of the adjoining Hermitage estate. He died here in 1869. About the middle of the last century, the name of the house was changed to Silverton but it was later reverted to the original Silveracre. Most of the land is now built on. It was also the home in the early part of the twentieth century of Surgeon Croly, who founded Baggot St Hospital.

==== St Enda's ====
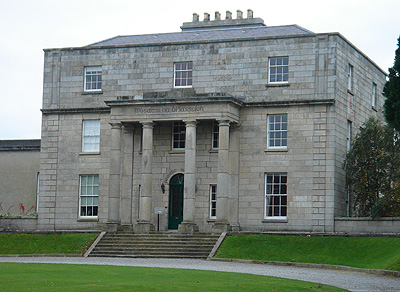
The Hermitage, site of St Enda's

The next estate on the same side is Hermitage or Saint Enda's, the former home of Patrick Pearse and later of his sister Margaret Mary Pearse. The house, which is entirely faced with cut granite and has an imposing stone portico, was occupied in the eighteenth century by Edward Hudson, an eminent dentist. He had a passion for Irish antiquities, which he demonstrated by erecting a number of romantic ruins around the estate. Hudson built a small watchtower inside the boundary wall near the entrance gate and further along, a "hermit's cave", a "dolmen", a "ruined abbey" and beside a deep well, a small chamber with a stone bench and a narrow fireplace. At the corner of the road to Whitechurch, the loopholed and crenulated structure, known as the "Fortification" or "Emmet's Fort" was another of his creations. South of the house, he built a grotto surmounted by a tall stone pillar and a Brehon's Chair. Just inside the boundary wall, he cut an inscription in Ogham on the two faces of a large rock. Translated they read: RIDENT VICINI GLEBASETS A KH A MOVENTEM EDUARDUM HUDSON. In the glen adjoining Whitechurch Road, he erected a sort of temple with several small chambers and flights of steps. The estate was at that time known as the "Fields of Oden" and is so-called on maps of the period. Within the grounds also, at the corner nearest to Whitechurch is an obelisk, stated to have been erected by a former owner, a Major Doyne, over the grave of a horse that carried him through the Battle of Waterloo. The date however of Major Doyne's occupation does not support this. Meanwhile, Pádraig Pearse wrote in An Macaomh that "a monument in the wood, beyond the little lake, is said to mark the spot where a horse of Sarah Curran's was killed and is buried." Unlike the constructions of Edward Hudson, which were purposely of the roughest material, this monument was of cut stone with small moulded pillars. After having been vandalized and toppled, it has since been re-erected without the pillars which were broken.

Edward Hudson was succeeded by his son William Elliot Hudson, who was born here in 1796. WE Hudson, a scholar, was a friend of Thomas Davis and Charles Gavan Duffy and was a patron of Irish literature and art. Shortly before his death in 1857, he endowed the Royal Irish Academy with a fund for the publication of its Irish Dictionary and he also left the Academy Library a collection of books.

From 1840 to 1858, Hermitage was the home of Richard Moore, Attorney-General, and in 1859 it came into the possession of Major Richard Doyne, stated to be a veteran of the Battle of Waterloo. From 1872 to 1885, it was occupied by George Campbell, merchant of 58 Sackville St., and after lying vacant for a few years it was tenanted by Major Philip Doyne of the 4th Dragoon Guards. In 1891, Colonel Frederick le Mesurier, a barrister returned as occupier and in 1899 Mr. William Woodburn was recorded as a resident.

St Enda's School was founded by Padraig Pearse in 1909 and was at first housed in Cullenswood House, Ranelagh. Pearse felt that the confined surroundings of this house gave no scope for the outdoor life that should play so large a part in the education of youth, so in 1910 he leased Hermitage from Mr Woodburn and moved his college here. A long billiard room was converted into a study hall and chapel, the drawing room became a dormitory and the stables opening off an enclosed square became classrooms. In "The Story of a Success" Pearse tells of the realisation of one of his life's ambitions and it was from here that he set off for the city on his bicycle for the last time on Easter Sunday 1916. After the rising, the college continued to function under the care of Margaret Pearse until it finally closed down in 1935. After the death of Margaret Pearse in 1968 St Enda's passed into the hands of the state and has since been opened as a public park and home of the Pearse Museum.

==== Priory ====
Directly opposite St Enda's was Priory. This house was the home of John Philpot Curran at the time of Robert Emmet's 1798 Uprising. The house was formerly named Holly Park but was changed by Curran when he bought it in 1790. Curran lived here for 27 years, during the peak of his fame. He was also living here at the time of the death of his daughter (aged 12), the loss of his wife (who left him for another man), and the discovery of the association of his daughter Sarah Curran with Robert Emmet.

In the area near the house, a number of sites have been associated by tradition with either Sarah Curran or Robert Emmet and some sources suggested that it may have been the "last resting place" of Emmet. In October 1979, The Hermitage estate was being developed and heavy machinery used to lay the roads and sewers. With the co-operation of the developers and using an excavator, a small group undertook an investigation of the site. A number of trenches were dug at the reputed site of Emmet's burial - as indicated on some maps. Though a number of successively wider and deeper trenches were excavated, and an area 20 yd (18 m) long and 10 yd (9.1 m) wide was cleared to a depth of 4 feet (1.2 m), no signs of disturbance or evidence of a burial was discovered. Those involved reportedly found the outcome to be "surprising and disappointing" as a number of accounts of Emmet's purported burial suggested that it had been made in a vault.

The Priory was occupied by the Curran family until 1875 and subsequently by the Taylors until 1923. As of the 21st century, the only remains of the house are "ruins on the green in Hermitage Estate".

== Amenities ==
Rathfarnham is home to several notable historic buildings, including Rathfarnham Castle and Loreto Abbey. Padraig Pearse established St Enda's School for Boys in the area. It is now a museum in his honour situated in Saint Enda's Park.

=== Parks ===
In addition to Saint Enda's Park, Marlay Park, Dodder Park and Bushy Park are also located in the area.

Marlay Park is a large open parkland, with a craft centre near the old "big house"; the park hosts concerts every year. The area also has several small green spaces and is home to two golf clubs.

=== Businesses ===
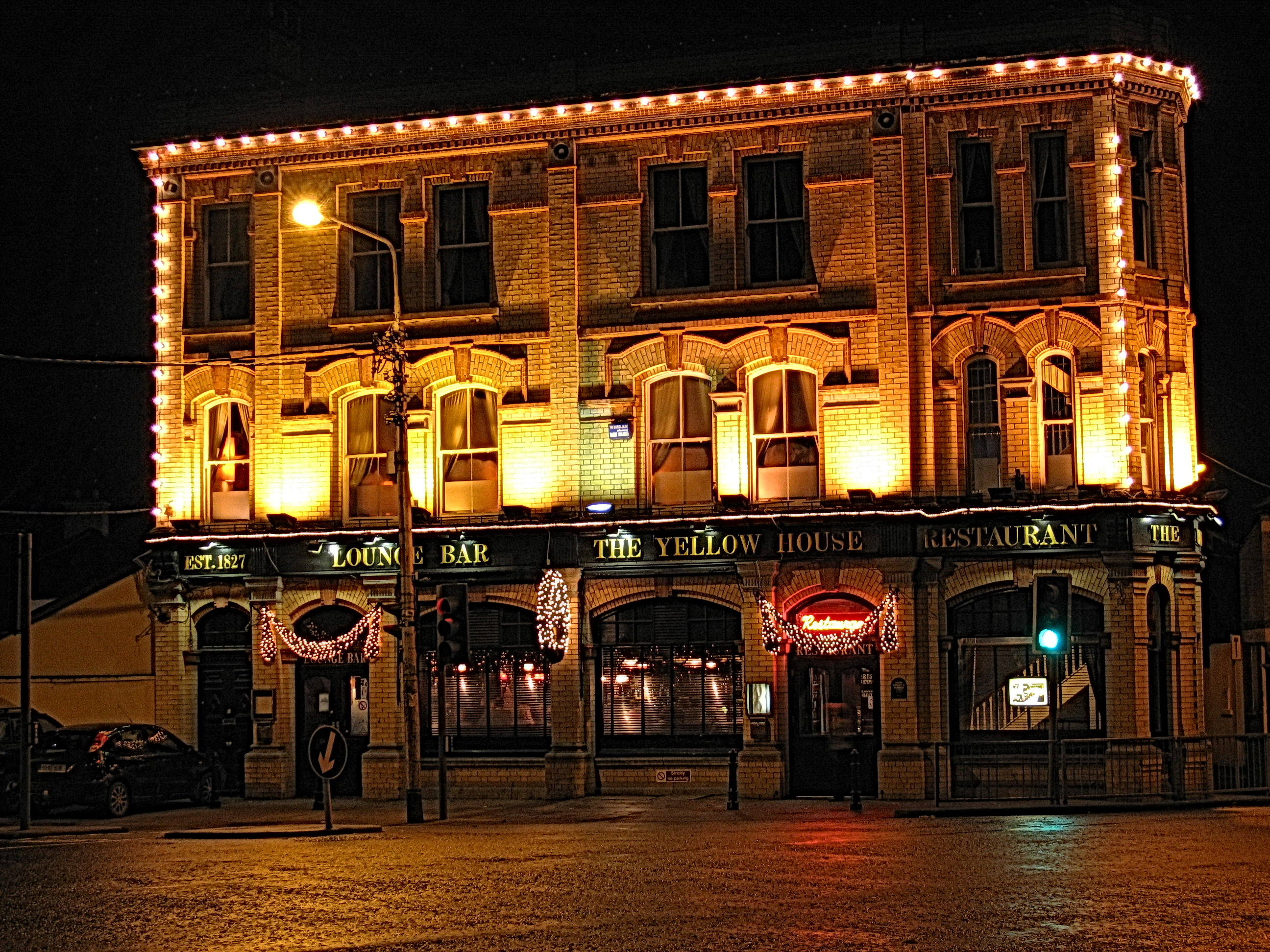
The Yellow House, Rathfarnham

Rathfarnham has a number of shops and businesses, including two bank branches and the Nutgrove Shopping Centre. The area's other shopping centre is the smaller Rathfarnham Shopping Centre. The area also has two post offices and is home to Dublin's main animal shelter.

Pubs in the area include the Georgian pub, "The Eden House", located on Grange Road near Marlay Park. The building was formerly "Eden House", one of the 18th century houses on Grange Road built around 1750, before being converted to its present use.

"Buglers", a pub in the Ballyboden/Rathfarnham area, reputedly opened in 1799, when a man named John Blake was granted a licence. On Rathfarnham's main street, near Rathfarnham Castle, is "The Castle Inn".

"The Yellow House", is at the corner of Willbrook Road and Grange Road. It is believed that the first pub bearing the name was a thatched cottage standing on the site of the present Catholic church and that the licence went back to the early 18th century. A new Yellow House was built in 1825 and opened for business in 1827. The current building dates from 1885.

=== Schools ===
There are six schools in Rathfarnham: St Marys BNS, Loreto High School, Loreto Primary, Gaelcholáiste an Phiarsaigh, Rathfarnham Parish National School and Educate Together Rathfarnham.

St Columba's College, a co-educational independent day and boarding school, is located in nearby Whitechurch.

== Organisations and sport ==
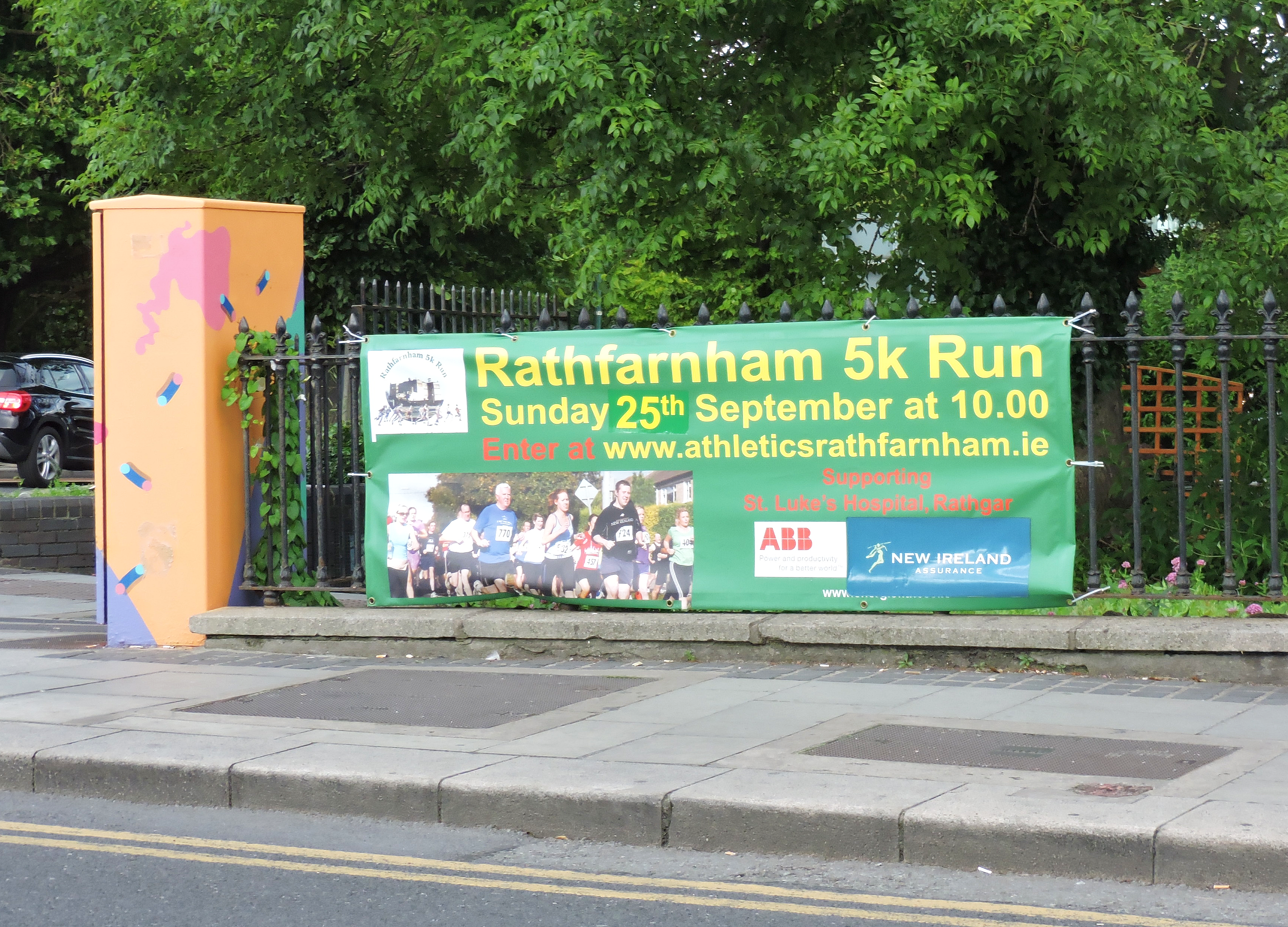
Signage for the 2016 Rathfarnham 5 km Run, organised by Rathfarnham WSAF Athletic Club

Rathfarnham is home to the 13th Dublin, the 14th Dublin, the 31st Dublin (which was founded in 1917) and the 68th Dublin Scout troops and a branch of the Irish Girl Guides. The area is also home to the Rathfarnham Concert Band.

Local Gaelic Athletic Association (GAA) clubs include Ballinteer St John's GAA and Ballyboden St. Enda's GAA. Rathfarnham also has a number of soccer teams including Nutgrove Celtic, Rathfarnham Punters, Rathfarnham Rovers, Leicester Celtic, Broadford Rovers and Whitechurch United.

== Demographics ==
As of the 2006 census, Rathfarnham then had a population of 17,333 – a drop of 2.1% since 2002. At that time, the population had gradually decreased over the years from 17,760 in 1996 to 17,717 in 2002.

The population of all electoral divisions labelled as Rathfarnham, as of the 2022 census, totalled 23,276.

== Climate ==
Rathfarnham has an oceanic climate (Köppen: Cfb).

Climate data for Rathfarnham
Month	Jan	Feb	Mar	Apr	May	Jun	Jul	Aug	Sep	Oct	Nov	Dec	Year
Mean daily maximum °C (°F)	7.4 (45.3)	7.9 (46.2)	9.1 (48.4)	11.1 (52.0)	14.0 (57.2)	16.6 (61.9)	18.0 (64.4)	17.8 (64.0)	16.2 (61.2)	13.2 (55.8)	9.8 (49.6)	7.9 (46.2)	12.4 (54.4)
Daily mean °C (°F)	5.4 (41.7)	5.6 (42.1)	6.5 (43.7)	8.3 (46.9)	11.0 (51.8)	13.7 (56.7)	15.2 (59.4)	15.0 (59.0)	13.4 (56.1)	10.8 (51.4)	7.7 (45.9)	6.0 (42.8)	9.9 (49.8)
Mean daily minimum °C (°F)	3.3 (37.9)	3.3 (37.9)	3.8 (38.8)	5.4 (41.7)	8.0 (46.4)	10.6 (51.1)	12.4 (54.3)	12.3 (54.1)	10.6 (51.1)	8.4 (47.1)	5.5 (41.9)	3.9 (39.0)	7.3 (45.1)
Average precipitation mm (inches)	66.6 (2.62)	62.6 (2.46)	63.5 (2.50)	65.1 (2.56)	76.5 (3.01)	75.4 (2.97)	86.4 (3.40)	84.7 (3.33)	75.4 (2.97)	92.9 (3.66)	88.3 (3.48)	78.9 (3.11)	916.3 (36.07)
Source: Weather.Directory

== Culture and entertainment ==
=== Music ===
Concerts are routinely held in Marlay Park. Acts to play the venue in have included Guns N' Roses, Foo Fighters, Kaiser Chiefs, Crowded House, Aerosmith, Damien Rice, The Who and Peter Gabriel. Marley Park has also hosted the Longitude Festival every July since 2013.

=== Film location ===
A number of films have shot some of their scenes in Rathfarnham. The opening scene in Intermission was recorded at Rathfarnham Shopping Centre. In one scene in the movie Ordinary Decent Criminal, a car is blown up in front of the Pearse Museum in St Enda's Park. The Secret Scripture was filmed in Loreto Abbey, Rathfarnham in 2015.

== Transport ==
Rathfarnham is served by the Dublin Bus route numbers 16 (Ballinteer to Dublin Airport via Dublin city centre), 15B (Stocking Avenue to Grand Canal Dock via the city centre), 74 to Dundrum and Go-Ahead Ireland route numbers S6 (to Tallaght) and 161 (to Rockbrook).

The Dublin, Dundrum and Rathfarnham Railway planned to build the Harcourt Street railway line as far as Dundrum, with a branch line from Ranelagh to Rathfarnham. However they failed to complete the railway and the Dublin and Wicklow Railway took over the line works. They never built the line to Rathfarnham, but Dundrum did serve as the nearest station until the line's closure in 1959.

Rathfarnham used to serve as the terminus for the Dublin tramways 16 and 17 routes from the 22 June 1879 until they both closed on 1 May 1939.

In 2007, it was proposed that a Luas tram line (mentioned in a feasibility study as 'Line E') would be routed through Rathfarnham. However, it was found that the proposal would not be feasible, as road widening would be required, necessitating the compulsory purchase of a significant number of homes and gardens on the route. Because of this, the project was not progressed.

== Notable people ==
- Lenny Abrahamson, film director and screenwriter
- Sarah Bolger, actress
- Frank Burke, sportsperson and revolutionary who lived in Willbrook
- John Castillo, poet
- William Chambers, architect
- Adam Clayton, U2 bass player who bought Danesmoate House in Rathfarnham
- Siobhán Cullen, actress
- Sarah Curran, fiancée of Robert Emmet and subject of several ballads, was born in County Cork and later lived with her family in Rathfarnham
- John Philpot Curran, orator who lived at The Priory (now Hermitage estate)
- Anne Devlin, member of the United Irishmen who is commemorated by a sculpture on Rathfarnham's main street
- Madeline Dicker was an Irish spy during the War of Independence
- Damien Duff, Irish footballer from Rathfarnham
- Robert Emmet, Irish republican rebel leader who lived on Butterfield Road
- Foil Arms and Hog, Irish comedy trio originally from the Rathfarnham/Terenure area
- Danielle Galligan, Irish actress from Rathfarnham
- Jim Gavin, Dublin football manager
- Don Givens, Irish football player, lived on Nutgrove Avenue prior to signing for Manchester United
- Morris Graves, artist.
- Stephen Gwynn, journalist, writer and nationalist politician
- Pádraig Harrington, professional golfer who attended Coláiste Éanna
- William Hayes (1913–1994), geneticist, born in Rathfarnham
- Claire Hennessy, author
- Frederick Robert Higgins, poet and theatre director
- Stephen Hiney, hurler
- Bulmer Hobson, Irish republican who lived at Mill House
- Henry Joy, judge who lived in Woodtown House
- Peter Lawrie, professional golfer who studied at Coláiste Éanna
- Adam Loftus, Lord Chancellor of Ireland
- Thomas MacDonagh, Irish revolutionary and teacher at St Enda's School.
- Sophie MacMahon, Irish international cricketer
- Eoin MacNeill, Irish language activist politician
- James McNeill, politician and diplomat
- Mick McGinley, former Gaelic footballer and father of Paul McGinley
- Paul McGinley, professional golfer and a member of Rathfarnham's Grange Golf Club since his childhood
- Joe McKinney, Irish stage and screen artist
- Annalise Murphy, sailor, Olympic silver medalist
- Darach Ó Séaghdha, author and journalist
- Sir Lawrence Parsons, judge and MP
- Basil Payne, poet
- Margaret Pearse, mother to Pádraig and Willie Pearse and later a Sinn Féin TD for the area, she lived at St Enda's, Grange Road
- Pádraig Pearse, lived at St Enda's on Grange Road which is now the Pearse Museum
- Willie Pearse, lived at St Enda's where he was also a teacher; Pearse Bridge on Rathfarnham Road is dedicated to the Pearse brothers
- Joseph Plunkett, Irish revolutionary and teacher at St Enda's School
- William Cusac Smith, politician and judge
- Jim Stynes, Australian rules footballer
- J. M. Synge, playwright
- Thomas Taylor, botanist
- Mother Teresa, studied at Loreto Abbey on Grange Road
- Robert Bentley Todd, physician
- James Henthorn Todd, academic
- Robert Wilks, 18th-century actor
- Barbara Woodhouse, dog trainer, author and TV personality
- W. B. Yeats, poet who lived at Riversdale House on Butterfield Avenue

== See also ==
- List of abbeys and priories in Ireland (County Dublin)
- List of castles in Ireland
- List of towns and villages in Ireland
