= Madeline Dicker =

Irish spy during War of Independence (born 1899)

- Born: 1899; Rathfarnham, Dublin

Madeline 'Dilly' Dicker (1899 –), was an Irish spy during the War of Independence.

== Biography ==
Madeline Dicker was born in Rathfarnham, Dublin in 1899 to Mary Alice Godfrey and Michael Dicker. Dicker's father was a civil servant who lived in Mountjoy Street with his mother, brother, wife and children. She was the alleged granddaughter of Sir William Duncan Godfrey and Mary Teresa Godfrey of Flesk Castle and Kilcolman Abbey. However the Godfreys always claimed she was in fact the daughter of William Hickson of Redcliffe, another important county Kerry family. Dicker was a musician and played the piano for silent movies in the cinemas in Dublin. She was skilled on the harp and the zither as well. Dicker often sat as a model for Augustus John and Leo Whelan, both painters working in Dublin.

Sympathetic to the cause of Irish Independence and connected to Michael Collins through her sister Clare who worked with him when he was in the Post Office, Dicker began carrying messages from Liam Tobin and Tom Cullen to him. Soon they were a couple and remained so til 1920. It was Collins who called her Dilly. As the War of Independence progressed, Dicker began taking greater risks. She would hide in a wicker basket and get placed in the mail room on the boat bringing the mail to Great Britain. There she'd wear a sorter's uniform and for the duration of the journey she'd assist in sorting the mail, separating out those letters due to go to the British secret service. These would be passed on to Sam Maguire or Art O'Brien before then being brought back to Ireland on her return journey. On that second leg Dicker would separate the mail due to go to Dublin Castle. She was also given the task of inserting information into the letters and getting them back into the postal system so that they would duly appear at their destination. Her home was being used as a safe house for Collins. There was another house across the road and using prearranged signals they could get him from one to the other in the case of a raid. When Collins was using her home as his safe house Dicker used the piano to cover any sound he might make in hiding during raids and to sound the all clear after the Auxiliaries had left.
