= Margaret Pearse =

Irish politician (1857–1932)

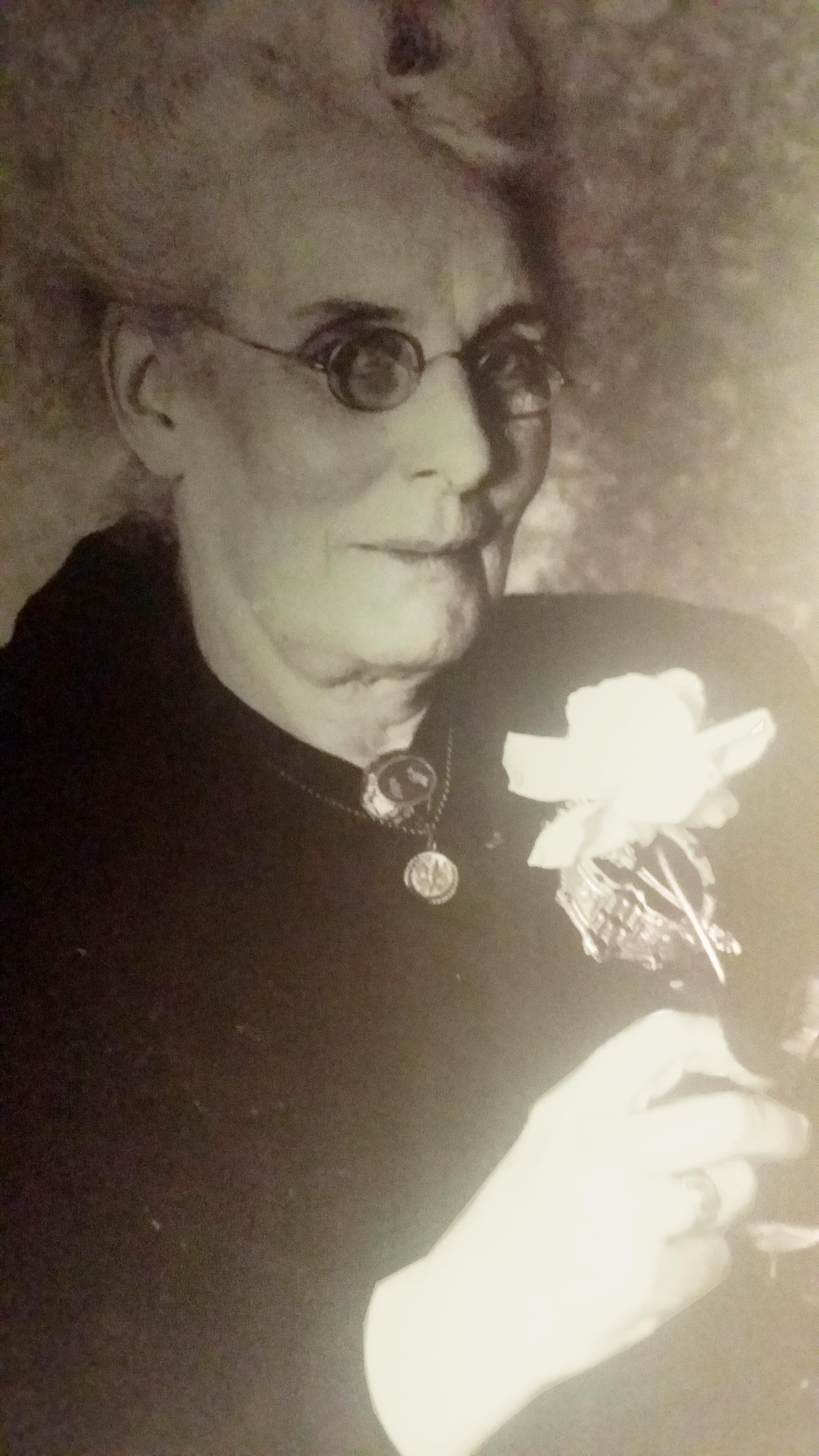

Teachta Dála
- In office May 1921 – June 1922
- Constituency: Dublin County

Personal details
- Born: Margaret Brady; 12 February 1857 Dublin, Ireland
- Died: 22 April 1932 (aged 75) Dublin, Ireland
- Party: Fianna Fáil
- Other political affiliations: Sinn Féin (until 1926)
- Spouse: James Pearse
- Children: 4, including: Patrick Pearse; William Pearse; Margaret Mary Pearse
- Occupation: Shop Assistant; Housekeeper; School Matron; Politician
- Known for: Mother of Patrick Pearse

Margaret Pearse (née Brady; 12 February 1857 – 22 April 1932) was an Irish politician. She was the mother of Patrick Pearse and Willie Pearse, who were both executed after the 1916 Easter Rising. She was later elected to Dáil Éireann.

== Early life ==
Margaret Brady was born on 12 February 1857 in Dublin and was baptised in St. Lawrence O'Toole's parish. At that time, her parents were living at 1, Clarence Street. Her father was Patrick Brady, a coal merchant, whose family were from County Meath and her mother was Brigid Brady (née Savage) of Oldtown, County Dublin. Margaret had three known siblings, and was educated by the Sisters of St Vincent de Paul. She was employed as a stationery shop assistant where she met her future husband, James Pearse.

== Marriage and children ==
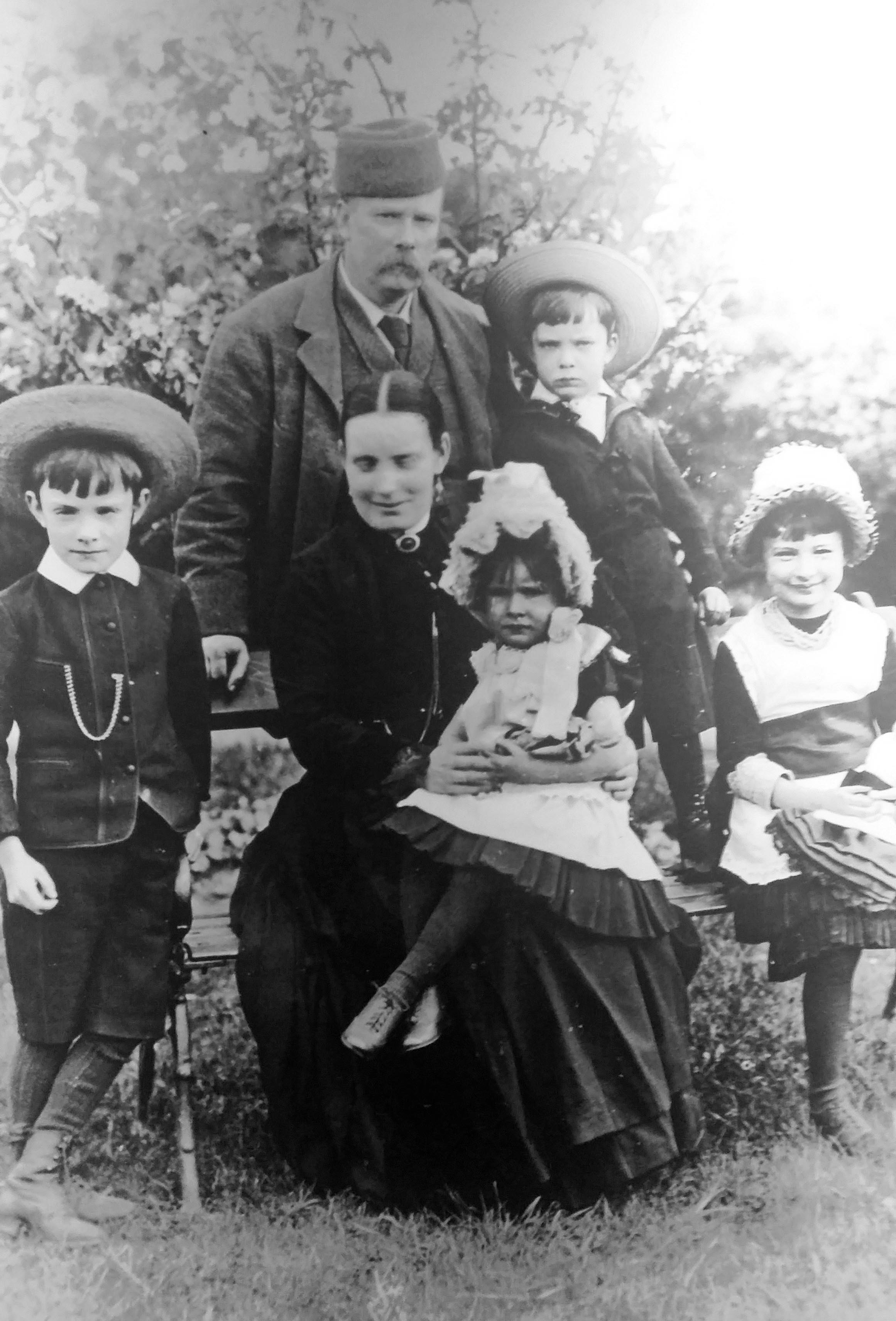
Pearse Family c.1887. William stands beside his father, Mary Brigit sits on her mother's knee, while Margaret sits to their left. Patrick is standing on the ground.

In 1877 she married James Pearse (his second marriage) at St. Agatha's church, off the North Strand. James was born in Bloomsbury, Middlesex, on 8 December 1839, and later lived in Birmingham. He came to Ireland to work as a sculptor in the late 1850s with his first wife, Emily Susanna Fox, who later died in 1876.

Margaret and James had four children together. The first three children are Margaret Mary born 4 August 1878, Patrick born 10 November 1879 and William born 15 November 1881. All three children were born while the family lived in 27 Great Brunswick St. Their youngest child, Mary Brigid, was born 29 September 1888, by which time the family had moved to Newbridge Avenue, Sandymount. Margaret's aunt, Margaret Brady, an Irish speaker, was a frequent visitor to the family home and encouraged the children's interest in the Irish language and culture. Her husband James Pearse died in 1900. Margaret Pearse did not permit her children to play with other children, however, she supported her children in all their aspirations. She had a very strong relationship and consequent effect on her eldest son, Patrick. She took over the responsibility of Housekeeper at the school at St. Enda's.

== Political career ==
Margaret supported her sons' political beliefs. After their execution, she wished to maintain their legacy and became involved in political life. She joined Sinn Féin after the Rising and gave support and endorsement to candidates during the 1918 Westminster election. During the 1920 Poor Law Elections for the Rathmines area of Dublin, Margaret stood as a Sinn Féin candidate and was elected on the first count. She was elected to Dáil Éireann as a Sinn Féin Teachta Dála (TD) for the Dublin County constituency at the 1921 elections.

She strongly opposed the Anglo-Irish Treaty, as did all the female TDs. She stated during the Treaty debate that:

I rise to support the motion of our President for the rejection of the Treaty. My reasons for doing so are various, but my first reason for doing so I would like to explain here today is my son's account. It has been said here on several occasions that Patrick Pearse would have accepted this Treaty. I deny it. As his mother I deny it, and on his account I will not accept it.

Later she continued in a similar vein:

Always we had to be on the alert. But even the Black and Tans alone would not frighten me as much as if I accepted this Treaty; because I feel in my heart – and I would not say it only I feel it – that the ghosts of my sons would haunt me.

Following the ratification of the Treaty she left the Dáil with the other anti-Treaty deputies. She was defeated at the 1922 general election. She supported those who opposed the Treaty during the Irish Civil War and continued to be a member of Sinn Féin until 1926. In 1926 she left the party conference with Éamon de Valera and became a founder member of Fianna Fáil. She never stood for election again.

Her daughter Margaret Mary Pearse also joined Fianna Fáil, and served as a TD from 1933 to 1937 and later served in Seanad Éireann as a Senator from 1938 until her death in 1968.

== Later life and legacy ==
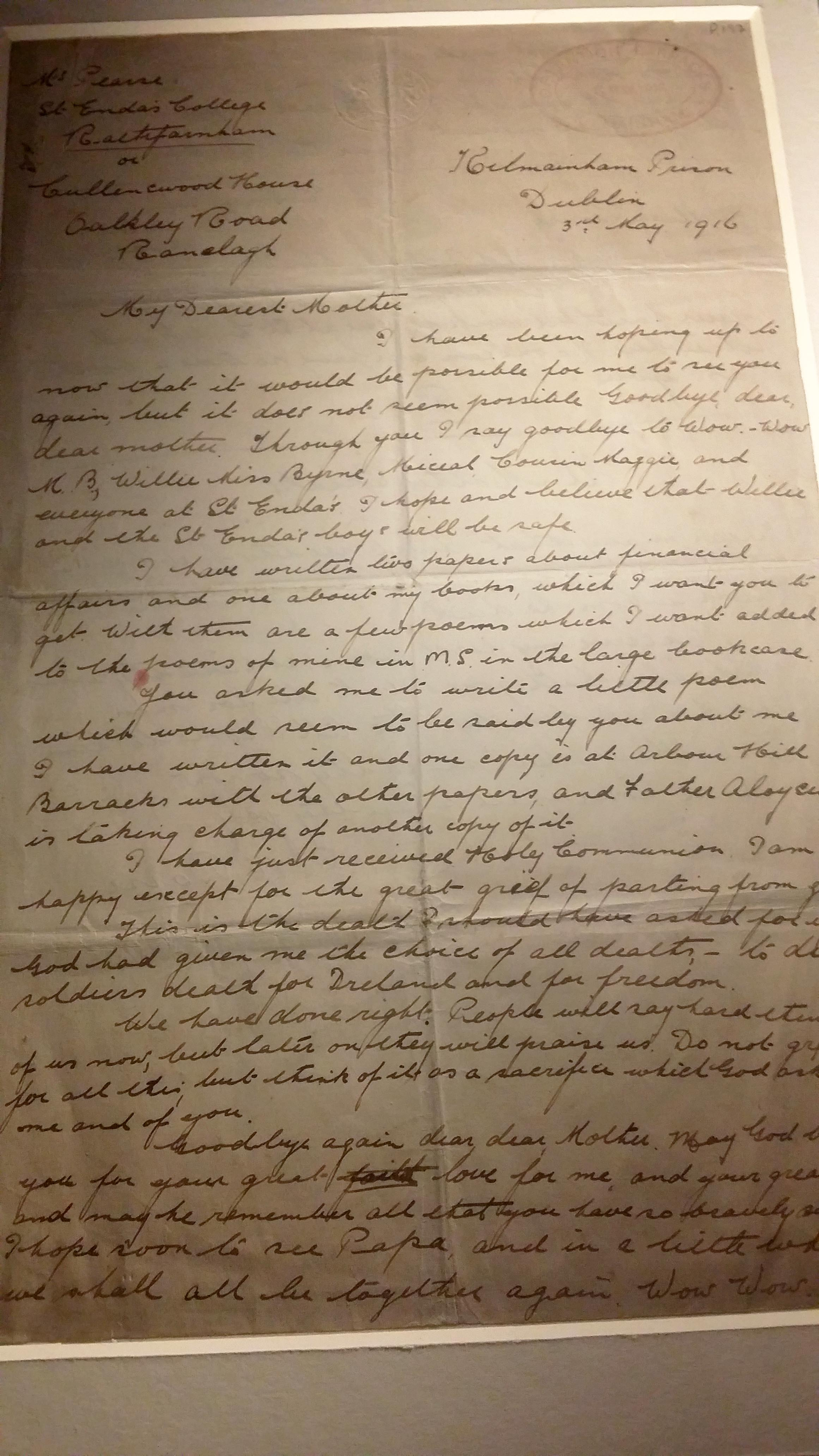
Last letter from Patrick Pearse to his mother. Written 3 May 1916 from Kilmainham jail.

At the launch of The Irish Press newspaper Margaret was asked to press the button to start the printers rolling. At many public occasions she stated that were her sons alive they too would have joined Fianna Fáil. Accordingly, Patrick Pearse is recognised as the spiritual figurehead of the party to this day.

Patrick Pearse founded St. Enda's in 1908 and was the headmaster up until the time of his execution. After Patrick's death, the responsibility for running the school fell to Margaret Pearse and her two daughters, Mary Margaret Pearse and Mary Brigid Pearse. As Patrick Pearse had died without a will, the school was left in a precarious financial position. In May 1924, when Margaret Pearse was aged 70, she undertook a trip to America to raise funds for the school, alongside showing support for Éamon de Valera and the Irish Republic. At an event in Brooklyn on 19 May 1924, when referencing the execution of her two sons, Margaret declared herself the "proudest mother in Ireland". She also stated that Michael Collins had attempted to "bribe" her with an offer to subsidise the school, which she refused. During a meeting in Seattle on 11 August 1924, she again discussed her sons and how she believed "the best way to honour their memory was to carry on their work for Ireland". Margaret raised over $10,000 in donations for the school during the trip. Notwithstanding Margaret's fundraising activities, St. Enda's continued to decline and eventually closed in 1935. Great Brunswick Street, where Margaret and the Pearse family originally lived, was renamed Pearse Street in 1920 by a resolution passed at a Dublin Corporation meeting.

== Death ==
Margaret Pearse died in 1932. She was honoured with a large state funeral and a motion was passed at the meeting of Dublin City Council expressing sympathy with the Pearse family. On 26 April 1932 sizeable crowds paid their respects as her funeral procession made its way through the streets of Dublin. At the General Post Office, where Patrick and William fought during the Easter Rising, the funeral cortege paused for a minute's silence before proceeding to Glasnevin Cemetery. Éamon de Valera gave an oration as she was laid to rest, which praised her inspiring courage, charity and cheerfulness during the years after her son's death.

After Margaret's death, her daughter, Mary Margaret, continued to reside at St. Enda's. Upon Mary Margaret's death in 1968, as per her mother's request, she passed the house on to the people of Ireland.

| Dáil | Election | Deputy (Party) | Deputy (Party) | Deputy (Party) | Deputy (Party) | Deputy (Party) | Deputy (Party) | Deputy (Party) | Deputy (Party) |
|---|---|---|---|---|---|---|---|---|---|
| 2nd | 1921 | Michael Derham (SF) | George Gavan Duffy (SF) | Séamus Dwyer (SF) | Desmond FitzGerald (SF) | Frank Lawless (SF) | Margaret Pearse (SF) | 6 seats 1921–1923 | |
| 3rd | 1922 | Michael Derham (PT-SF) | George Gavan Duffy (PT-SF) | Thomas Johnson (Lab) | Desmond FitzGerald (PT-SF) | Darrell Figgis (Ind) | John Rooney (FP) | 6 seats 1921–1923 | |
| 4th | 1923 | Michael Derham (CnaG) | Bryan Cooper (Ind) | Thomas Johnson (Lab) | Desmond FitzGerald (CnaG) | Darrell Figgis (Ind) | John Good (Ind) | Kathleen Lynn (Rep) | Kevin O'Higgins (CnaG) |
| 4th | 1924 by-election | Batt O'Connor (CnaG) | Bryan Cooper (Ind) | Thomas Johnson (Lab) | Desmond FitzGerald (CnaG) | Darrell Figgis (Ind) | John Good (Ind) | Kathleen Lynn (Rep) | Kevin O'Higgins (CnaG) |
| 4th | 1926 by-election | Batt O'Connor (CnaG) | Bryan Cooper (Ind) | Thomas Johnson (Lab) | Desmond FitzGerald (CnaG) | William Norton (Lab) | John Good (Ind) | Kathleen Lynn (Rep) | Kevin O'Higgins (CnaG) |
| 5th | 1927 (Jun) | Batt O'Connor (CnaG) | Bryan Cooper (Ind) | Thomas Johnson (Lab) | Desmond FitzGerald (CnaG) | Patrick Belton (FF) | John Good (Ind) | Seán MacEntee (FF) | Kevin O'Higgins (CnaG) |
| 5th | 1927 by-election | Batt O'Connor (CnaG) | Bryan Cooper (Ind) | Thomas Johnson (Lab) | Desmond FitzGerald (CnaG) | Patrick Belton (FF) | John Good (Ind) | Seán MacEntee (FF) | Gearóid O'Sullivan (CnaG) |
| 6th | 1927 (Sep) | Batt O'Connor (CnaG) | Bryan Cooper (CnaG) | Joseph Murphy (Ind) | Desmond FitzGerald (CnaG) | Seán Brady (FF) | John Good (Ind) | Seán MacEntee (FF) | Gearóid O'Sullivan (CnaG) |
| 6th | 1930 by-election | Batt O'Connor (CnaG) | Thomas Finlay (CnaG) | Joseph Murphy (Ind) | Desmond FitzGerald (CnaG) | Seán Brady (FF) | John Good (Ind) | Seán MacEntee (FF) | Gearóid O'Sullivan (CnaG) |
| 7th | 1932 | Batt O'Connor (CnaG) | Thomas Finlay (CnaG) | Patrick Curran (Lab) | Henry Dockrell (CnaG) | Seán Brady (FF) | John Good (Ind) | Seán MacEntee (FF) | Gearóid O'Sullivan (CnaG) |
| 8th | 1933 | Batt O'Connor (CnaG) | John A. Costello (CnaG) | Margaret Mary Pearse (FF) | Henry Dockrell (CnaG) | Seán Brady (FF) | John Good (Ind) | Seán MacEntee (FF) | Gearóid O'Sullivan (CnaG) |
| 8th | 1935 by-election | Cecil Lavery (FG) | John A. Costello (CnaG) | Margaret Mary Pearse (FF) | Henry Dockrell (CnaG) | Seán Brady (FF) | John Good (Ind) | Seán MacEntee (FF) | Gearóid O'Sullivan (CnaG) |
| 9th | 1937 | Cecil Lavery (FG) | Henry Dockrell (FG) | Gerrard McGowan (Lab) | Patrick Fogarty (FF) | Seán Brady (FF) | 5 seats 1937–1948 | | |
| 10th | 1938 | Patrick Belton (FG) | Henry Dockrell (FG) | Thomas Mullen (FF) | Patrick Fogarty (FF) | Seán Brady (FF) | 5 seats 1937–1948 | | |
| 11th | 1943 | Liam Cosgrave (FG) | Henry Dockrell (FG) | James Tunney (Lab) | Patrick Fogarty (FF) | Seán Brady (FF) | 5 seats 1937–1948 | | |
| 12th | 1944 | Liam Cosgrave (FG) | Henry Dockrell (FG) | Patrick Burke (FF) | Patrick Fogarty (FF) | Seán Brady (FF) | 5 seats 1937–1948 | | |
| 12th | 1947 by-election | Liam Cosgrave (FG) | Henry Dockrell (FG) | Patrick Burke (FF) | Seán MacBride (CnaP) | Seán Brady (FF) | 5 seats 1937–1948 | | |
| 13th | 1948 | Éamon Rooney (FG) | Seán Dunne (Lab) | Patrick Burke (FF) | 3 seats 1948–1961 | | | | |
| 14th | 1951 | Éamon Rooney (FG) | Seán Dunne (Lab) | Patrick Burke (FF) | 3 seats 1948–1961 | | | | |
| 15th | 1954 | Éamon Rooney (FG) | Seán Dunne (Lab) | Patrick Burke (FF) | 3 seats 1948–1961 | | | | |
| 16th | 1957 | Éamon Rooney (FG) | Kevin Boland (FF) | Patrick Burke (FF) | 3 seats 1948–1961 | | | | |
| 17th | 1961 | Éamon Rooney (FG) | Kevin Boland (FF) | Patrick Burke (FF) | Mark Clinton (FG) | Seán Dunne (Ind) | 5 seats 1961–1969 | | |
| 18th | 1965 | Des Foley (FF) | Kevin Boland (FF) | Patrick Burke (FF) | Mark Clinton (FG) | Seán Dunne (Lab) | 5 seats 1961–1969 | | |
| 19th | 1969 | Constituency abolished. See Dublin County North and Dublin County South | | | | | | | |
