= St. Enda's School =

Irish-language school established in 1908

Coordinates: 53°16′59″N 6°16′54″W

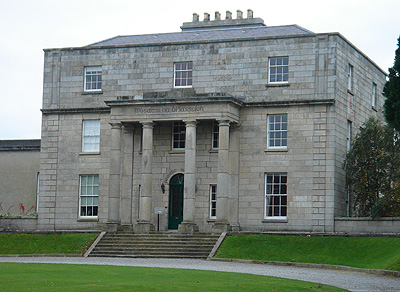
The Hermitage, site of St. Enda's

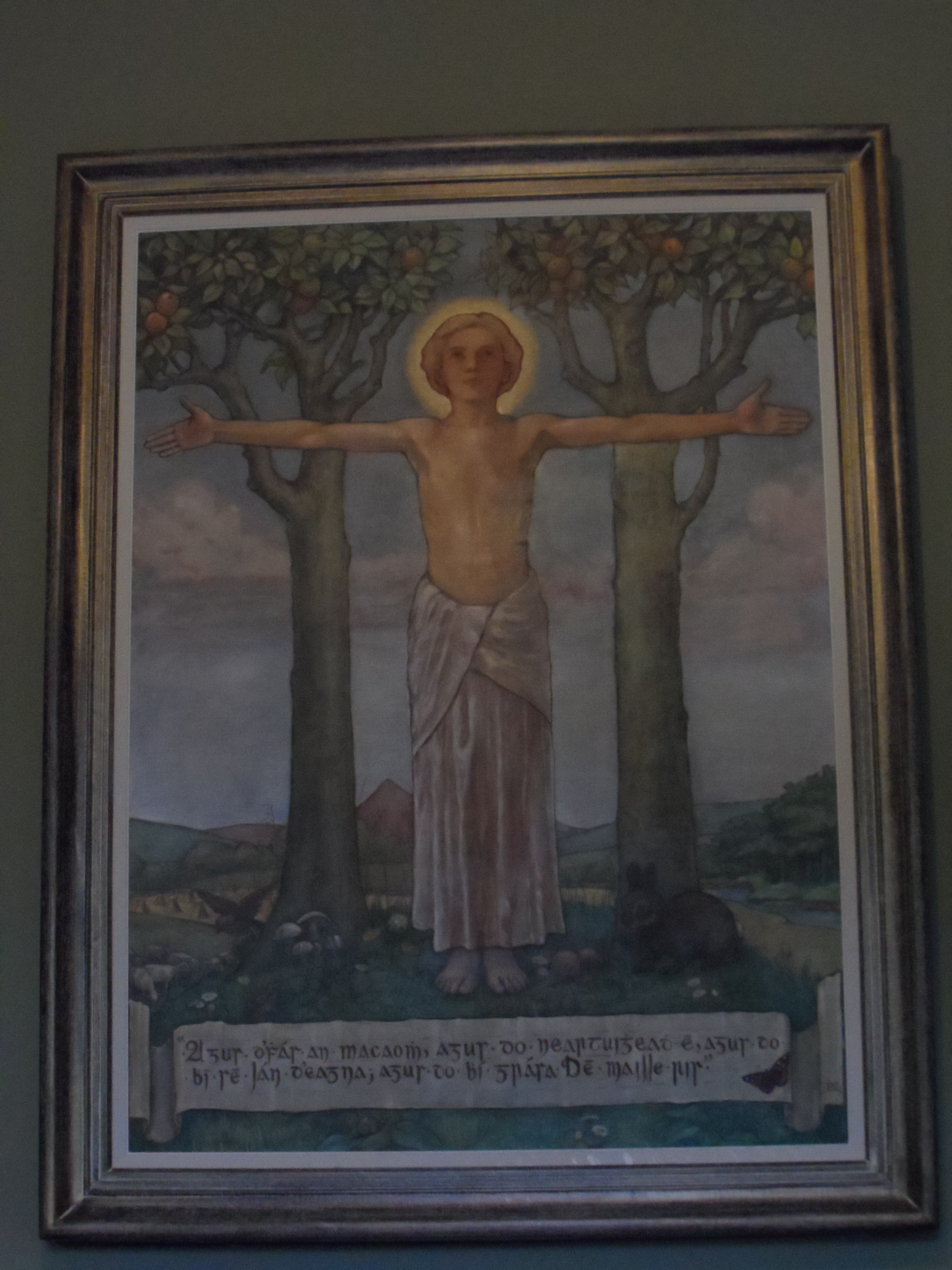
Painting in St. Enda's

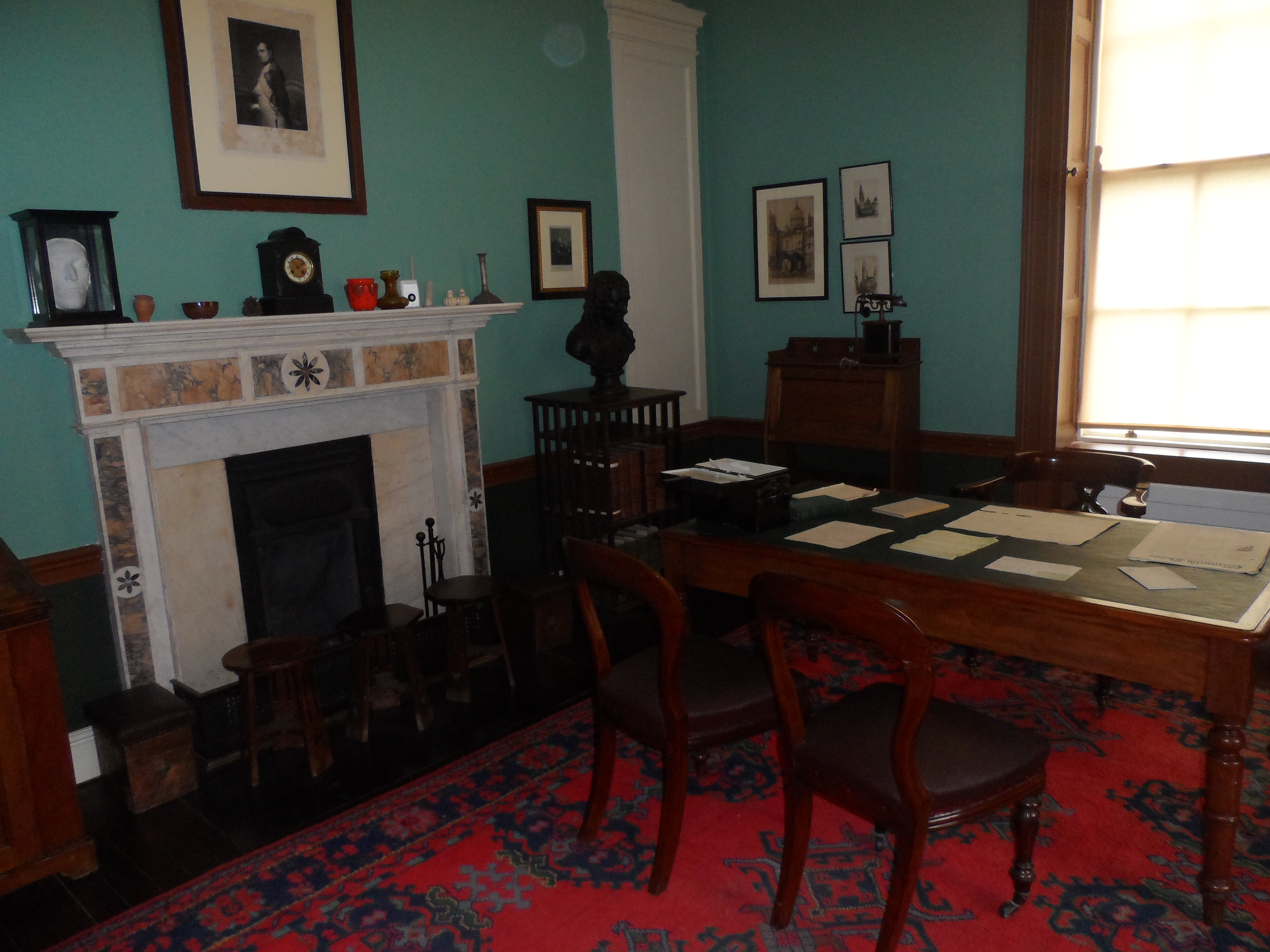
Office in St. Enda's

St. Enda's School (Irish: Scoil Éanna) was an Irish-language secondary school established in 1908 by Irish nationalist Patrick Pearse. Originally Pearse's school was established in 1908 at Cullenswood House, Ranelagh before moving to the Hermitage in Rathfarnham in 1910. After Pearse was executed for his part in the 1916 rising, and due to increasing financial worries, the school closed in 1935. Today the site is occupied by the Pearse Museum.

== Background ==
Pearse, one of the leaders of the Easter Rising in 1916, had long been critical of the educational system in Ireland, which he believed taught Irish children to be good Englishmen. He had for years been committed to the preservation of the Irish language, mostly through the Gaelic League, and was dearly concerned about the language's future. A trip abroad to Belgium and his observations of bilingual education there inspired him to attempt a similar experiment at home. Pearse also simply enjoyed educating boys, writing: "To me a boy is the most interesting of all living things, and I have for years found myself coveting the privilege of being in a position to mould or help to mould, the lives of boys to noble ends."

Pearse was not a practical businessman, but did not let lack of finances get in the way of his plans. With promises from prominent nationalists that as proponents of Irish heritage they would provide whatever limited financial support they could, and, where applicable, enroll their children, Pearse officially opened his school on 8 September 1908, in Cullenswood House, Ranelagh, a suburb of Dublin.

The school proved a successful experiment, but was never to fully escape the shadow of looming financial woes. In fact, the school would not have survived the crucial first few years without the devoted aid of his good friend and assistant headmaster Thomas MacDonagh, and the solid dedication of Pearse's brother Willie.

== Move to Rathfarnham ==
St. Enda's taught many of the classes in Irish, and particularly stressed the arts and dramatics. Everything was given an Irish approach. After two years the school was doing quite well. Thrilled with his creation, and concerned that Cullenswood House was not a location that did St. Enda's justice, Pearse found what he believed to be the perfect home for the school. The Hermitage in Rathfarnham, substantially further from Dublin than Cullenswood House, caught his imagination and he decided that the school would have to move there. The substantial extra expenses involved did not deter him, nor was anything likely to, for the Hermitage, in addition to having a pastoral setting, had a connection with Robert Emmet, an Irish martyr and hero of Pearse's. It was on these grounds that Emmet had courted Sarah Curran, who had lived nearby and whose father did not look kindly on young Emmet, forcing them to the grounds of the nearby Hermitage for their trysts.

In addition, the school's namesake, St. Enda of Aran, had similarly left his life to teach a devoted group of students in the secluded Aran Islands, much as Pearse was now to do. In 1910, St. Enda's opened its doors at the Hermitage.

The Hermitage, while perfect for Pearse's idyllic image of what he hoped to achieve, proved to be a financial disaster. The extra distance made it less practical for the day-school boys, forcing many of them to drop out rather than switch to boarding. In addition to this school, Pearse had decided to use Cullenswood House to establish a similar school for girls, St. Ita's. With bankruptcy looming, Pearse was forced to look to the United States for further funding. A lecture tour gave him some good contacts among the exiled Fenians, who would prove to play a large part in Ireland's near political future, but the money he raised only kept the school barely in solvency.

== Later years and closure ==
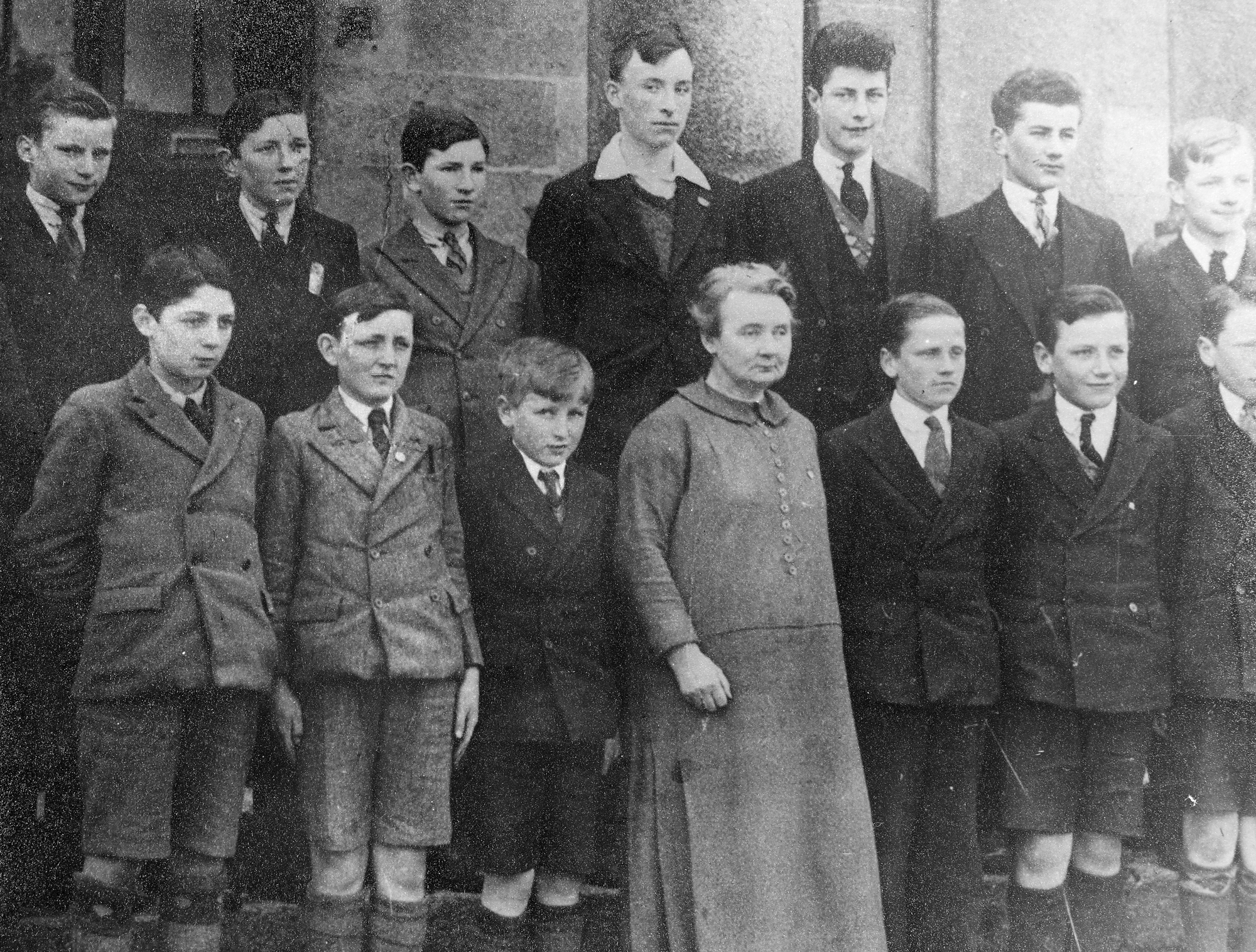
Margaret Pearse with pupils at St. Enda's, circa 1930

Pearse's involvement in the Irish Volunteers in 1913, and his active participation in the Irish Republican Brotherhood shortly thereafter, left St. Enda's with a less devoted master than it had previously. Pearse's radical politics also made even some moderate supporters question what their children might be exposed to, and some, notably Eoin MacNeill, removed their children from Pearse's influence. As it turned out, a large number of St. Enda's pupils did join the Fianna Éireann, and even the IRB, fifteen of whom later took part in the Easter Rising in 1916.

Following the execution of the Pearse brothers after the rising, their mother reopened St. Enda's back at Cullenwood House, facilitated by the closure of St. Ita's. Frank Burke, an ex-pupil who had served in the Rising, was headmaster. The school returned to the Hermitage in 1919. The international fame the rising had given Pearse and his martyrdom made raising funds easier than before, and the following year Margaret Pearse had raised enough to buy the property Pearse could never afford in his lifetime. However, without the leadership of either of the Pearse brothers, St. Enda's could not last, and it eventually closed its doors for good in 1935.

== Pearse Museum ==
Today the Hermitage stands as the Pearse Museum, dedicated to the memory of the school's founders.

The museum contains several reconstructions of original rooms, including the study used by Patrick Pearse, the common sitting room, one of the dormitories, the school art gallery and the school museum. There is also a gallery solely devoted to William Pearse and his sculptures.

In the courtyard behind the school house, it is possible to visit a nature study room with examples of Irish plants and animals.

== See also ==
- Category:People educated at St. Enda's School
