= Willie Pearse =

Irish revolutionary (1881–1916)

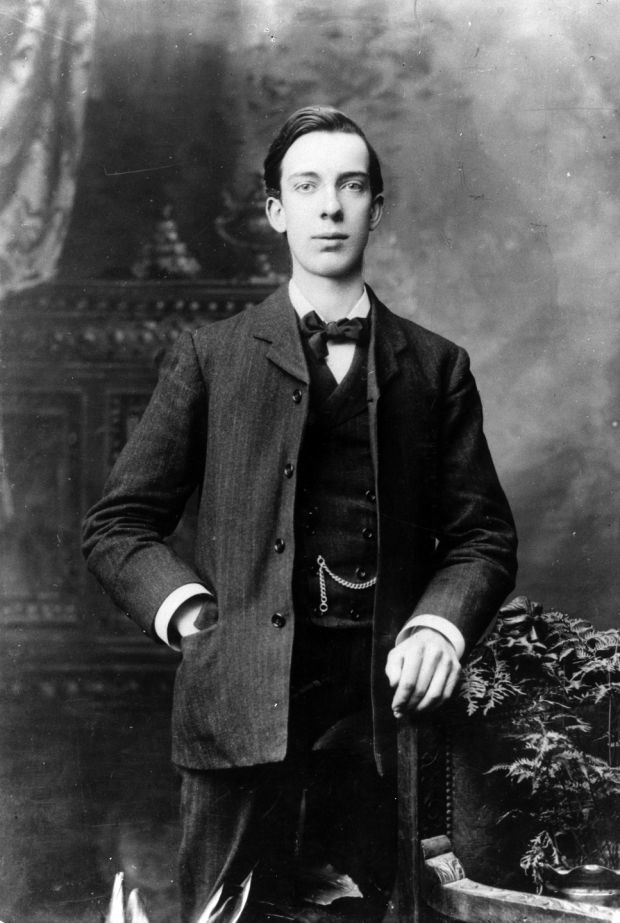
- Born: 15 November 1881; Dublin, Ireland
- Died: 4 May 1916 (aged 34); Kilmainham Gaol, Dublin, Ireland
- Cause of death: Execution by firing squad
- Military career
- Allegiance: Irish Republic
- Branch: Irish Volunteers
- Service years: 1913–1916
- Rank: Captain
- Conflicts: Easter Rising
- Memorials: Pearse Street; Dublin Pearse railway station

William James Pearse (Irish: Uilliam Seamus Mac Piarais; 15 November 1881 – 4 May 1916) was an Irish republican executed for his part in the Easter Rising. He was a younger brother of Patrick Pearse, a leader of the rising.

== Background ==
Willie Pearse was born in Dublin and throughout his life lived in the shadow of his brother to whom he was devoted and with whom he formed a particularly close relationship.

Pearse inherited his father's artistic abilities and became a sculptor. He was educated at the Christian Brothers School, Westland Row. He studied at the Metropolitan School of Art in Dublin under Oliver Sheppard. He also studied art in Paris. While attending the Kensington School of Art in London he gained notice for several of his artworks. Some of his sculptures are to be found in Limerick Cathedral, the Cathedral of St. Eunan and St Columba, Letterkenny and several Dublin churches. He was trained to take over his father's stonemason business, but gave it up to help run St. Enda's School which Patrick had founded in 1908. He was involved in the arts and theatre at St. Enda's, and aided the overall running of the school.

== Easter Rising ==
Pearse followed his brother into the Irish Volunteers and the Republican movement. He took part in the Easter Rising in 1916, always staying by his brother's side at the General Post Office. Following the surrender he was court-martialled and sentenced to death. It is believed that he was only executed because of being Patrick's brother. However, he had signed some orders as "acting chief of staff" which may have exaggerated his role. And he had pleaded guilty at his court-martial, the only one of the executed to do so. Willie was executed on 4 May, the day after his brother.

== Commemoration ==
There are many more public commemorations of Patrick Pearse than of Willie. In 1966, Dublin's Westland Row railway station was renamed Pearse Station to honour both Willie and Patrick. Pearse Street (previous Great Brunswick Street), in Dublin, were renamed in honour of both, having been their birthplace. Willie Pearse Park in Crumlin, opened in 1949, is named after him. While many streets and roads in Ireland bear the name Pearse; few name Willie, but there is a Pearse Brothers Park in Rathfarnham. The bridge over the Dodder river on the Rathfarnham Road, between Terenure and Rathfarnham is named after them and carries a plaque depicting the brothers in profile. Brothers Pearse Athletic Club, founded in Rathfarnham, is named after the two brothers.

A number of Gaelic Athletic Association clubs and playing fields are named after both Pearses, and at least one after Willie:

- Armagh: Annaghmore Pearses GAC; Pearse Óg GAC and its grounds, Pearse Óg Park, Armagh
- Cork: CLG Na Piarsaigh, Cork
- Dublin: Willie Pearse Park, the grounds of Crumlin GAA
- Kerry: Dromid Pearses GAC; Kilflynn Pearses HC (defunct)
- Limerick: CLG Na Piarsaigh, Limerick
- Louth: CPG Na Piarsaigh, Dundalk
- Monaghan: Ballybay Pearse Brothers, and its grounds, Pearse Park
- Tyrone: Dregish Pearse Og GAC; Fintona Pearses GAC; and Galbally Pearses GAC
- Wicklow: Pearses' Park, Arklow
- London: Brother Pearse's GAC, London
- Yorkshire: Brothers Pearse GAC, Huddersfield
- Padraig Pearses GAA club Woodmount County Roscommon.
