= List of loughs of County Mayo =

County Mayo (shaded dark green)

This is a list of loughs in County Mayo, Ireland.

- Ballin Lough
- Ballymore Lough
- Bekan Lough
- Lough Beltra
- Bunaveela Lough
- Lough Caheer
- Callow Lough
- Lough Carra
- Carrowmore Lake
- Carrowribly Lough
- Castlebar Lough
- Clogher Lough
- Cloon Lough
- Clough Lough
- Lough Conn
- Cooley Lough
- Corragaun Lough
- Lough Corrib
- Corryloughaphuill Lough
- Cross Lough
- Lough Cullentragh
- Lough Cullin
- Curraghfin Lough
- Lough Dahybaun
- Derry Lough
- Derryhick Lough
- Doo Lough
- Drumleen Lough
- Lough Duncan
- Lough Feeagh
- Lough Fin
- Furnace Lough
- Lough Glenawough
- Glencullin Lough
- Gohery Lough
- Island Lough (seasonal)
- Islandeady Lough
- Keel Lough
- Knappaghbeg Lough
- Knocknagun Lough
- Leam Lough
- Levallinree Lough
- Levally Lough
- Lough Mallarc
- Mannin Lake
- Lough Mask
- Moher Lough
- Lough Muck
- Lough Nacorra
- Nacorralea Lough
- Lough Nadirkmore
- Nageltia Lough
- Lough Naminnoo
- Nanoge Lough
- Lough Roe
- Roonagh Lough
- Tawnyard Lough
- Termocarragh Lake
- Urlaur Lough
- Washpool Lough

== See also ==
- List of loughs in Ireland
