= Lough Bofin =

Lough Bofin is the name of two lakes in Ireland:

- Lough Bofin, County Galway, a lake in the Connemara region of County Galway
- Lough Bofin (River Shannon), a lake on the River Shannon, on the border of Counties Roscommon and Leitrim
