= List of loughs of Ireland =

This is an alphabetical list of loughs (lakes) on the island of Ireland. It also shows a table of the largest loughs. The word lough is pronounced like loch (/lɒk, lɒx/) and comes from the Irish loch, meaning 'lake'.

According to the Environmental Protection Agency, there are an estimated 12,000 lakes in the Republic of Ireland, covering an area of more than 1,200 square kilometres. The largest lough, by area, in Ireland is Lough Neagh. Lough Corrib is the second largest, and is the largest in the Republic. The largest lough, by water volume, is Lough Neagh, with Lough Mask being the largest by volume in the Republic.

The list below contains only those loughs that are of geographic, geological, or historical importance and almost all of them are over a square kilometre in area. It includes loughs that are in Northern Ireland and the Republic of Ireland. Those partly or wholly within Northern Ireland are marked with an asterisk (*).

== Largest Irish lakes ==
The largest freshwater loughs in Ireland are:

Rank (by area)	Lake	Area km^{2} (sq mi)	Mean Depth m (ft)	Max Depth m (ft)	Volume ×10^{6}m^{3} (×10^{6}cu ft)	Shoreline km (mi)	County/Counties
1	Lough Neagh*	396 (153)	9.0 (29.5)	25 (82)	3,528 (124,600)	186 (116)	Antrim, Down, Armagh, Tyrone, Londonderry
2	Lough Corrib	176 (68)	6.5 (21)	50.9 (167)	1,158 (40,900)	392 (244)	Galway and Mayo
3	Lough Derg (Shannon)	130 (50)	7.6 (25)	36 (118)	988 (34,900)	229 (142)	Tipperary, Clare and Galway
4	Lower Lough Erne*	109 (42)	11.9 (39)	69 (226)	1,300 (46,000)	270 (170)	Fermanagh
5	Lough Ree	105 (41)	6.2 (20)	35 (115)	651 (23,000)	192 (119)	Roscommon, Longford and Westmeath
6	Lough Mask	83 (32)	15.0 (49.2)	58 (190)	1,300 (46,000)	192 (119)	Mayo and Galway
7	Lough Conn	50 (19)	7.0 (23.0)	34 (112)	350 (12,000)	108 (67)	Mayo
8	Lough Allen	35 (14)	10.9 (36)	42.7 (140)	391 (13,800)	53 (33)	Leitrim and Roscommon
9	Upper Lough Erne*	34 (13)	2.3 (7.5)	27 (89)	79 (2,800)	255 (158)	Fermanagh
10	Lough Melvin*	23 (8.9)	7.8 (26)	44 (144)	175 (6,200)	54 (34)	Fermanagh and Leitrim
11	Lough Leane	20 (7.7)	13.4 (44)	60 (200)	269 (9,500)	51 (32)	Kerry
12	Poulaphouca Reservoir	20 (7.7)	6.8 (22)		135 (4,800)	64 (40)	Wicklow
13	Lough Sheelin	19 (7.3)	4.4 (14)	15 (49)	83.6 (2,950)	36 (22)	Westmeath, Cavan, Meath
14	Lough Carra	16 (6.2)	1.8 (5.9)	18 (59)	28.8 (1,020)	75 (47)	County Mayo

Muckross Lake (the middle lake of the Killarney lakes) is the deepest Irish lake, with a maximum depth of 75 metres.

(Volume = Area * Mean Depth)

== Freshwater lakes ==
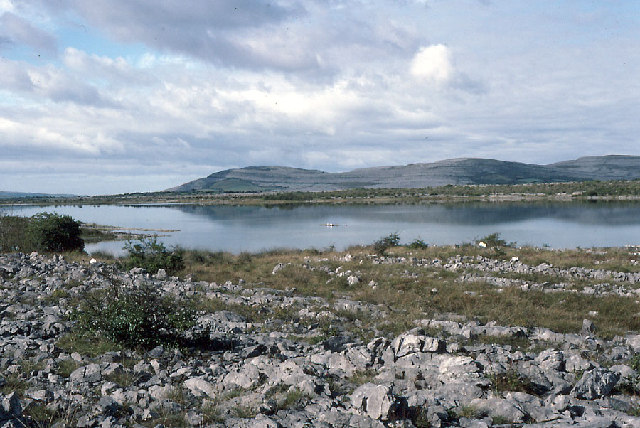
Lough Bunny in The Burren

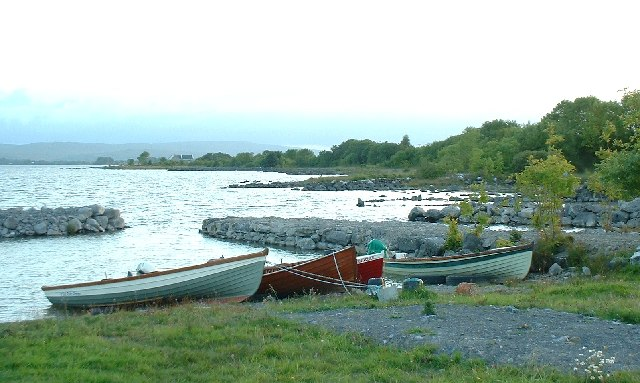
Fishing boats on Inchiquin, Lough Corrib.

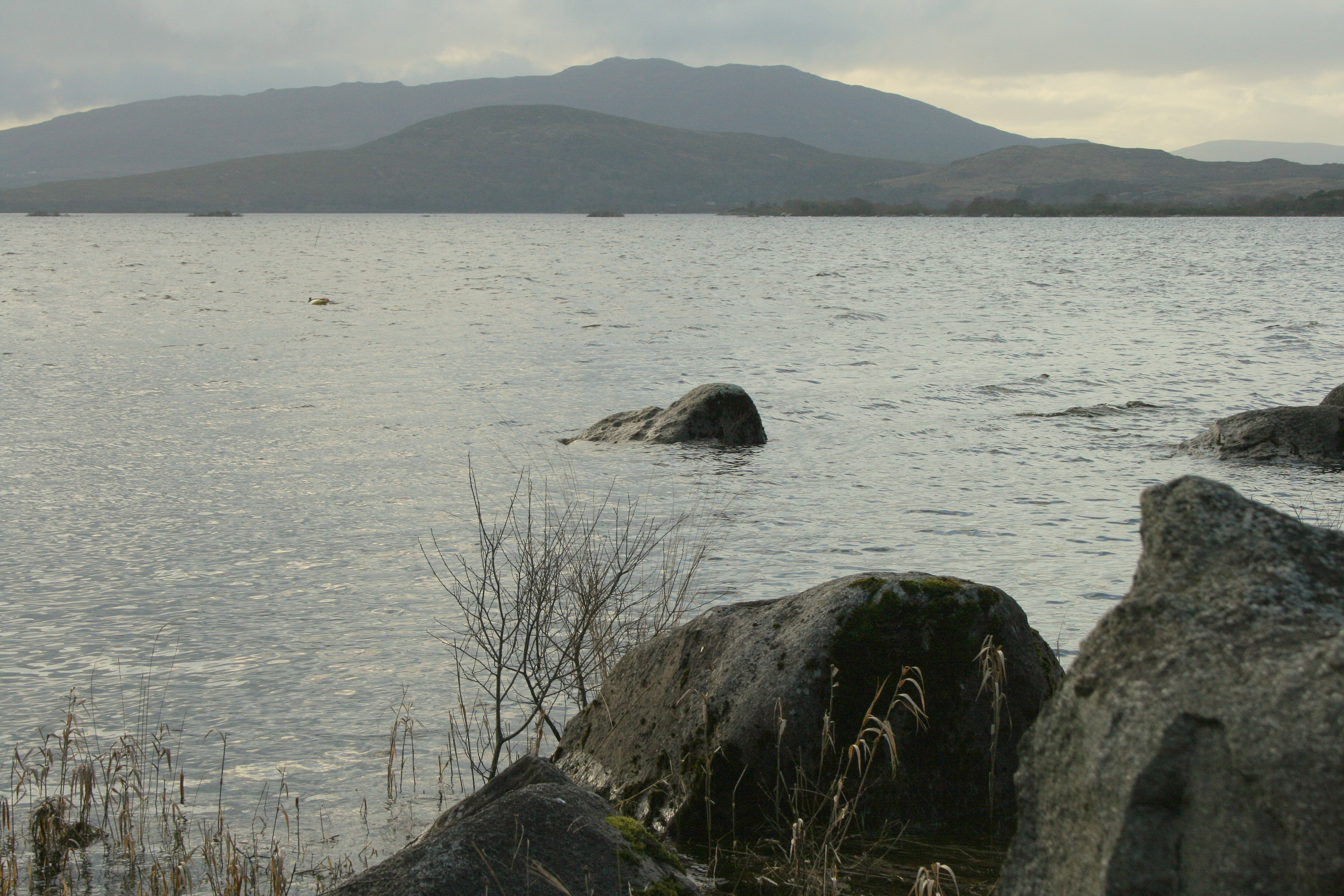
Lough Cullin, County Mayo under Nephin

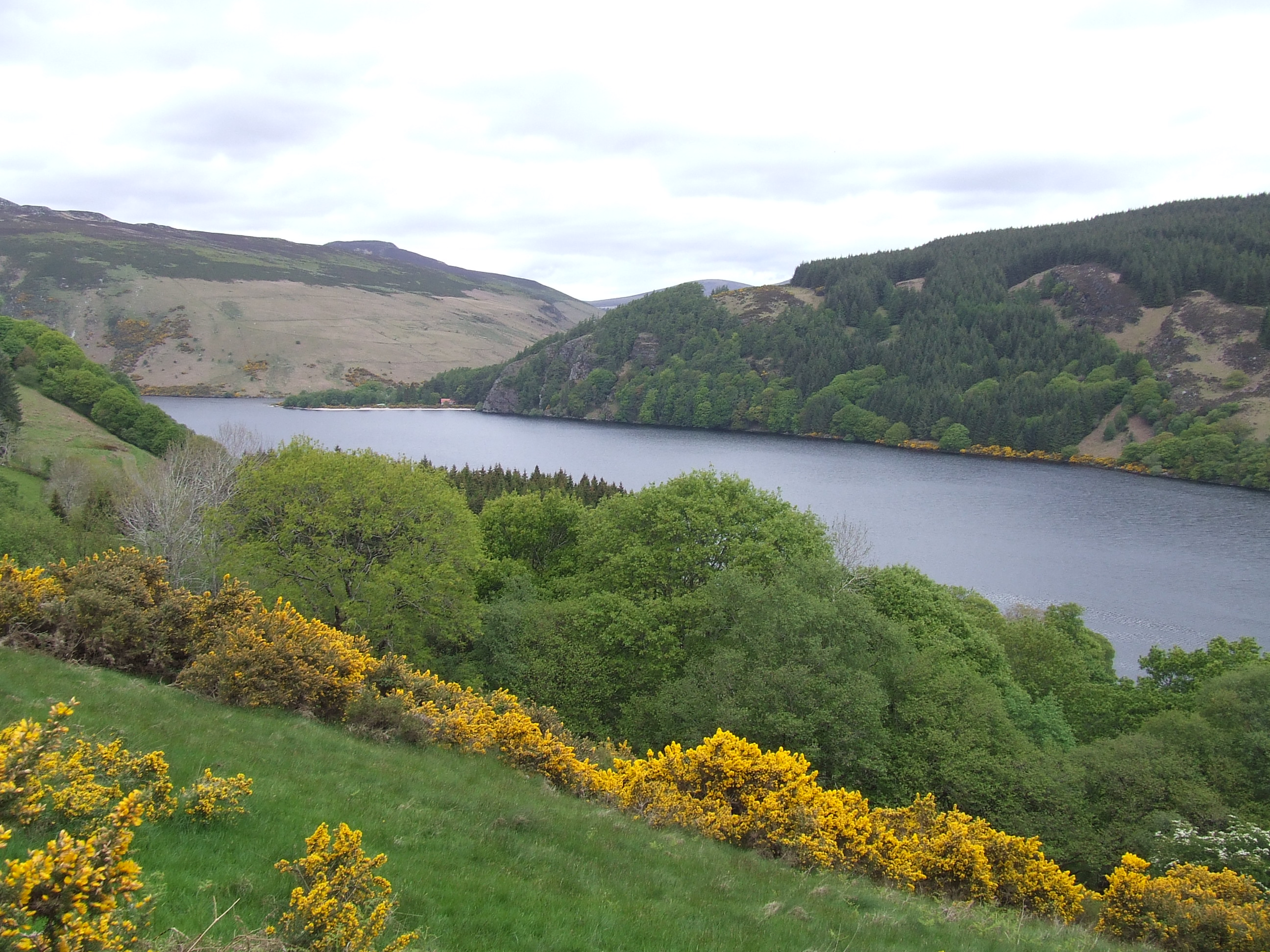
Lough Dan

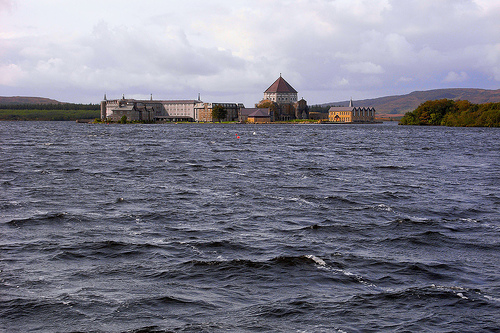
Donegal's Lough Derg and Station Island

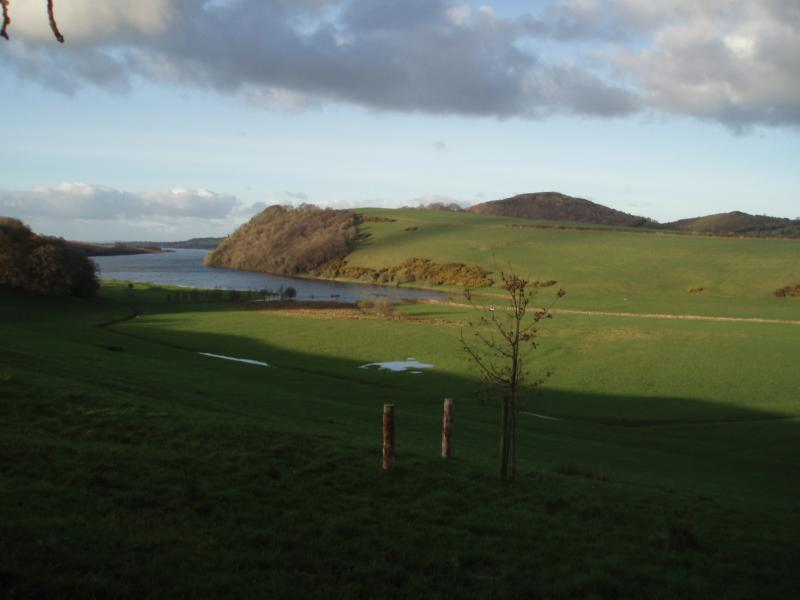
Lough Derravaragh and Knockeyon

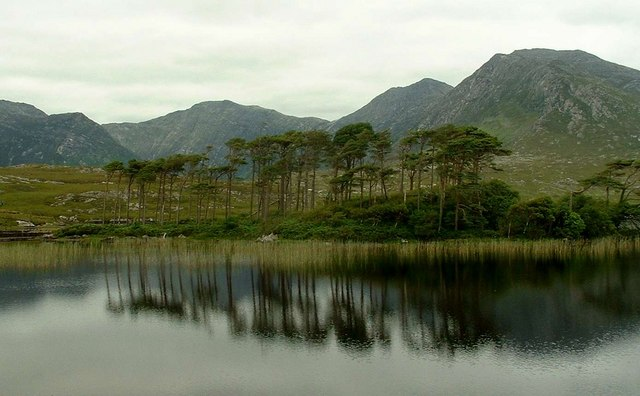
Derryclare Lough

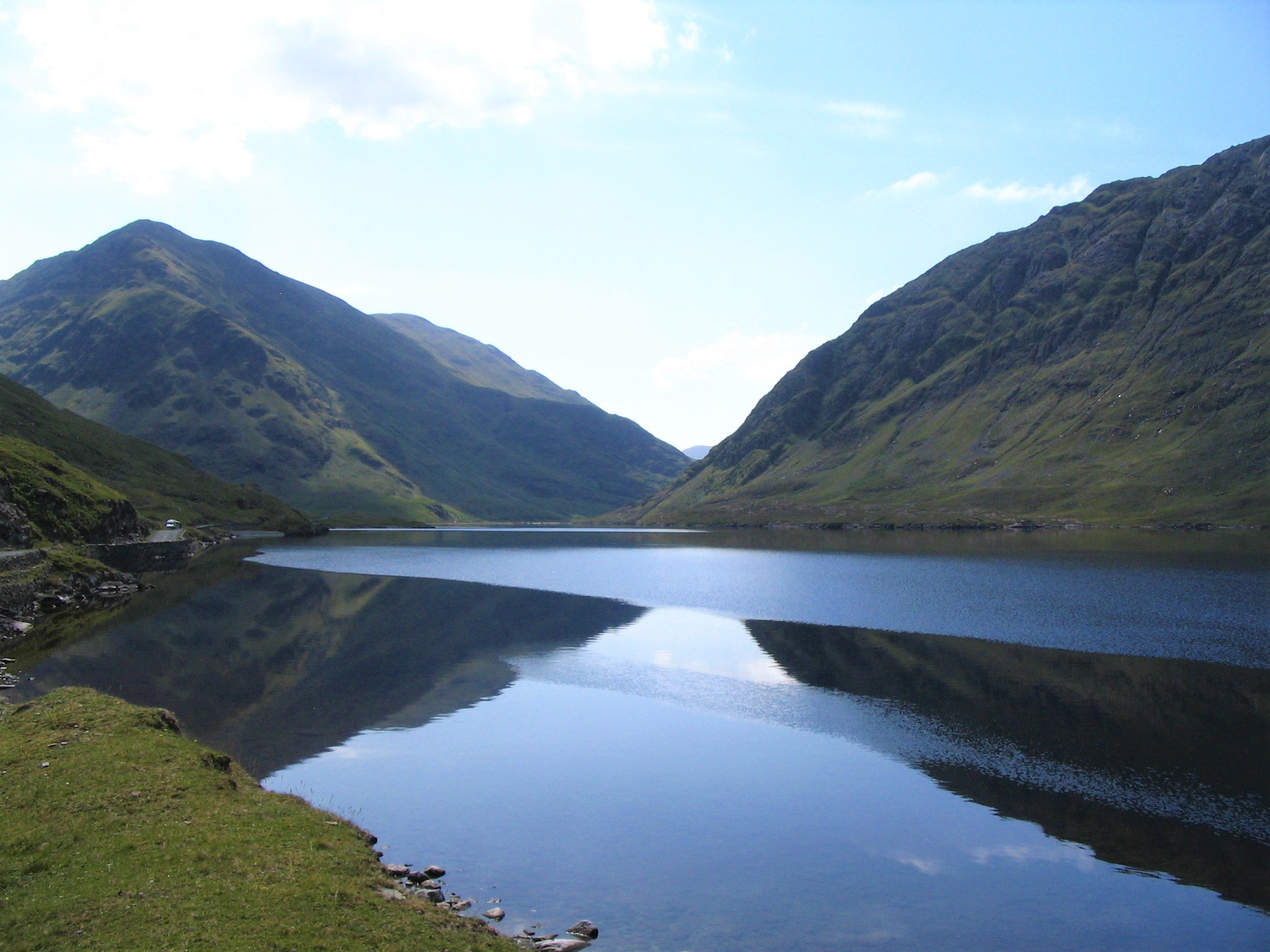
Mayo's Doo Lough and Delphi Pass

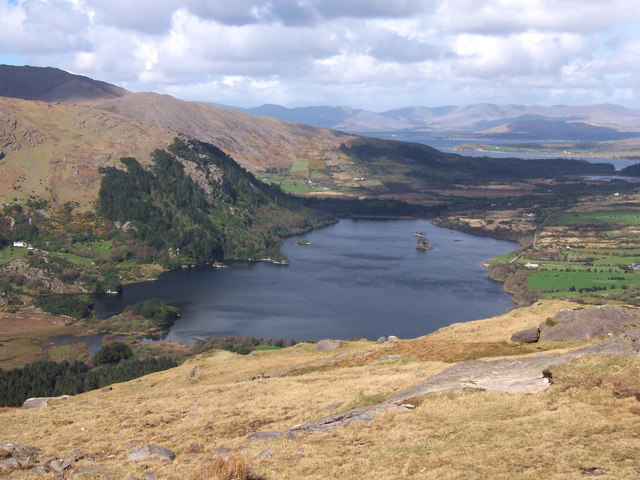
Glanmore Lake

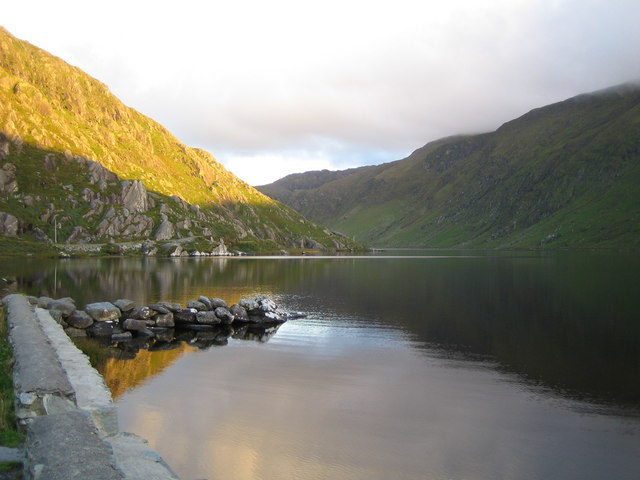
Glenbeg Lough

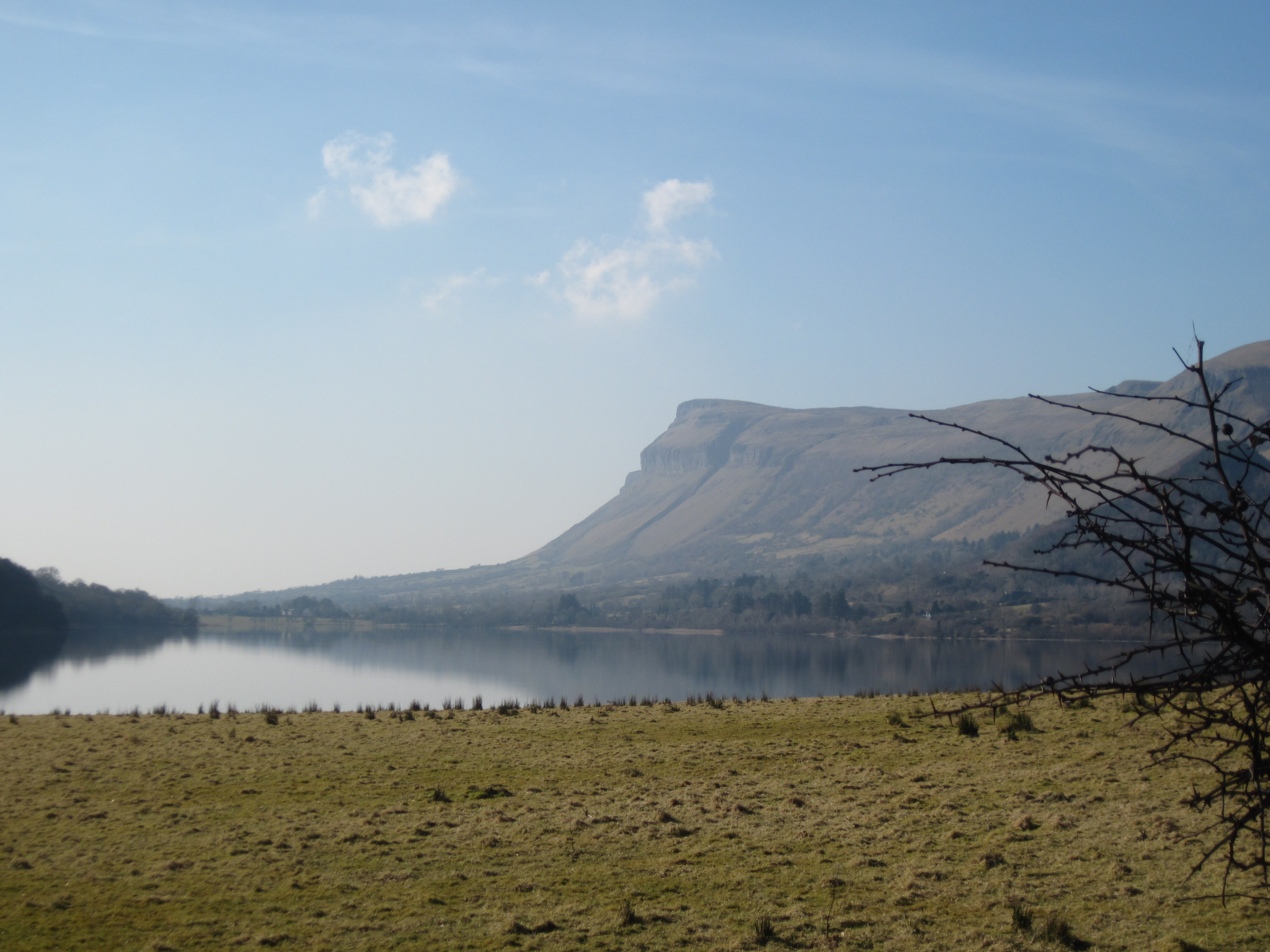
Glencar Lough and Benbulbin

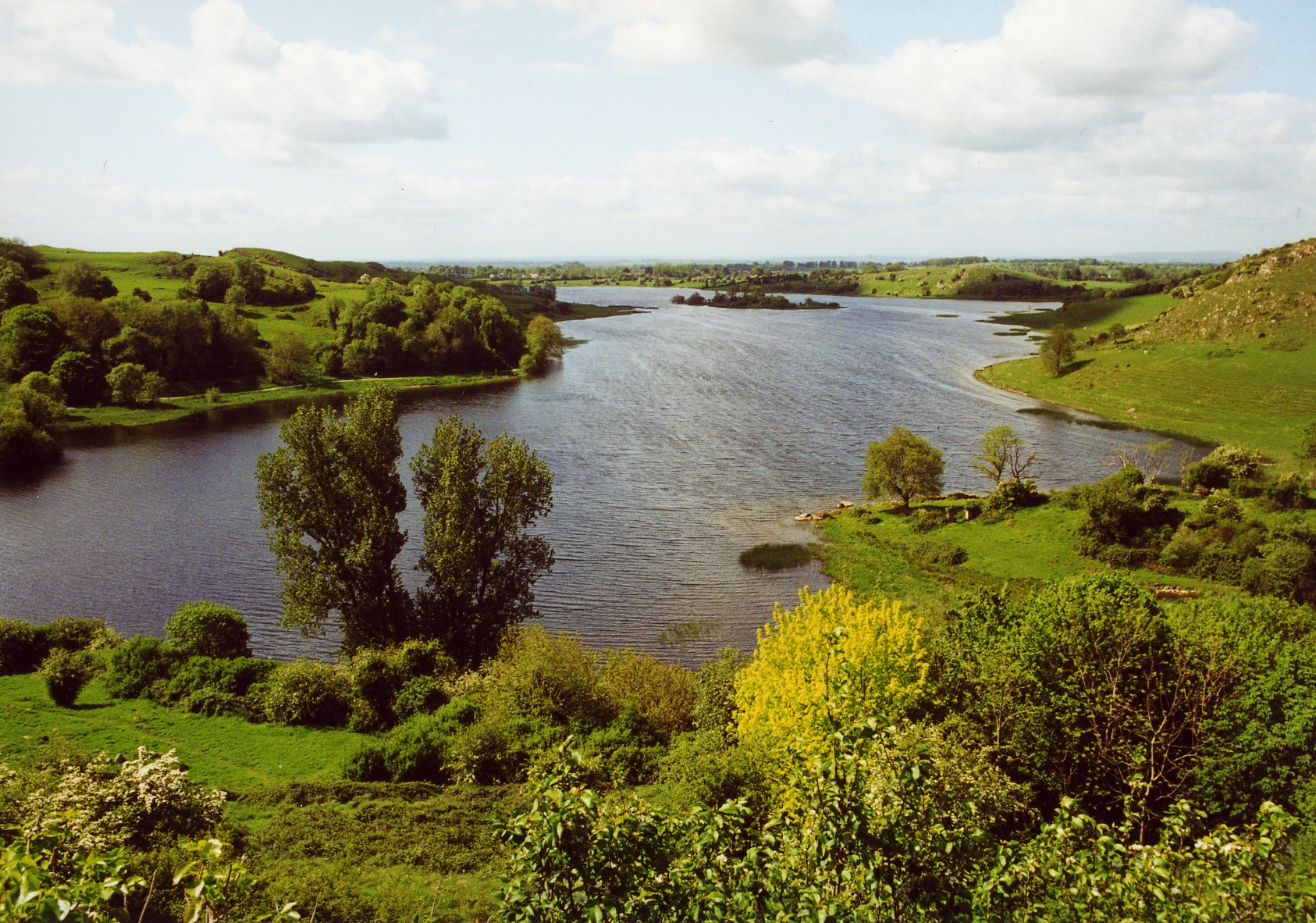
Lough Gur

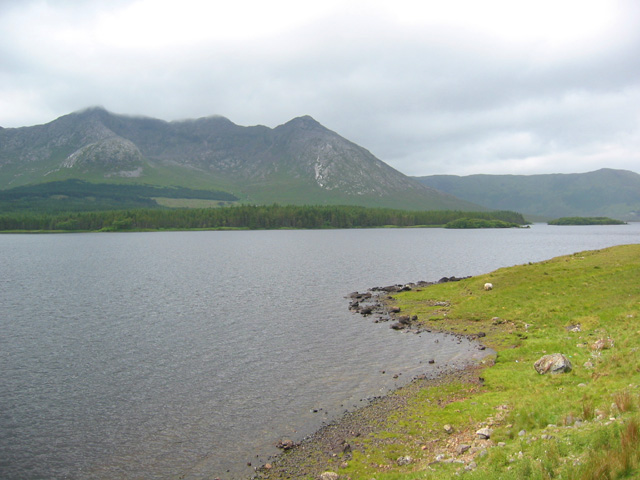
Lough Inagh and the Twelve Bens

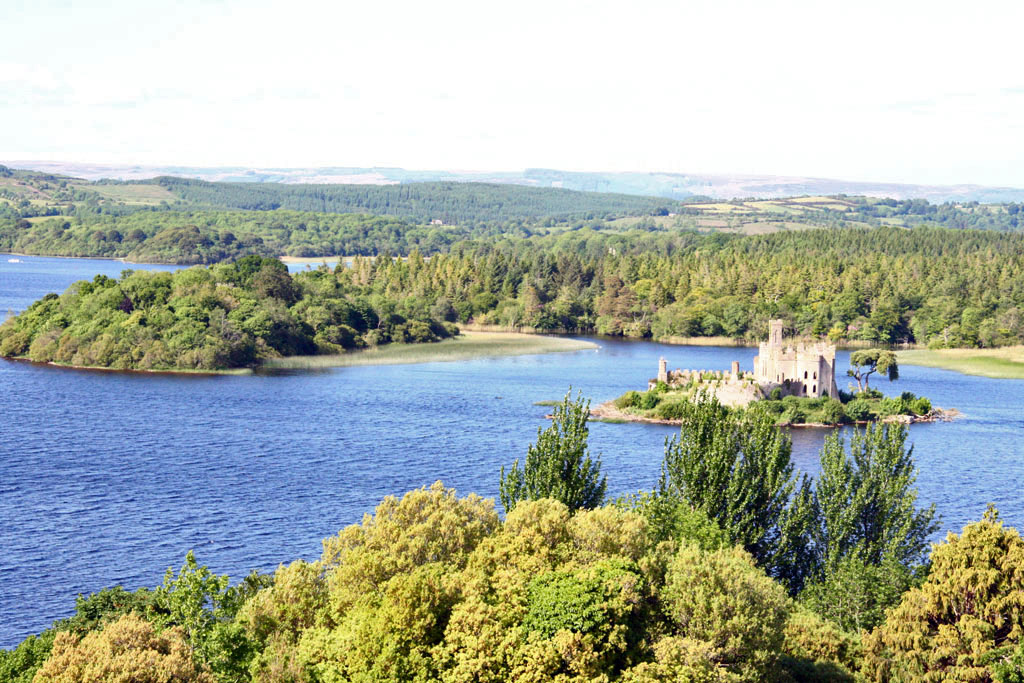
Lough Key and Castle Island

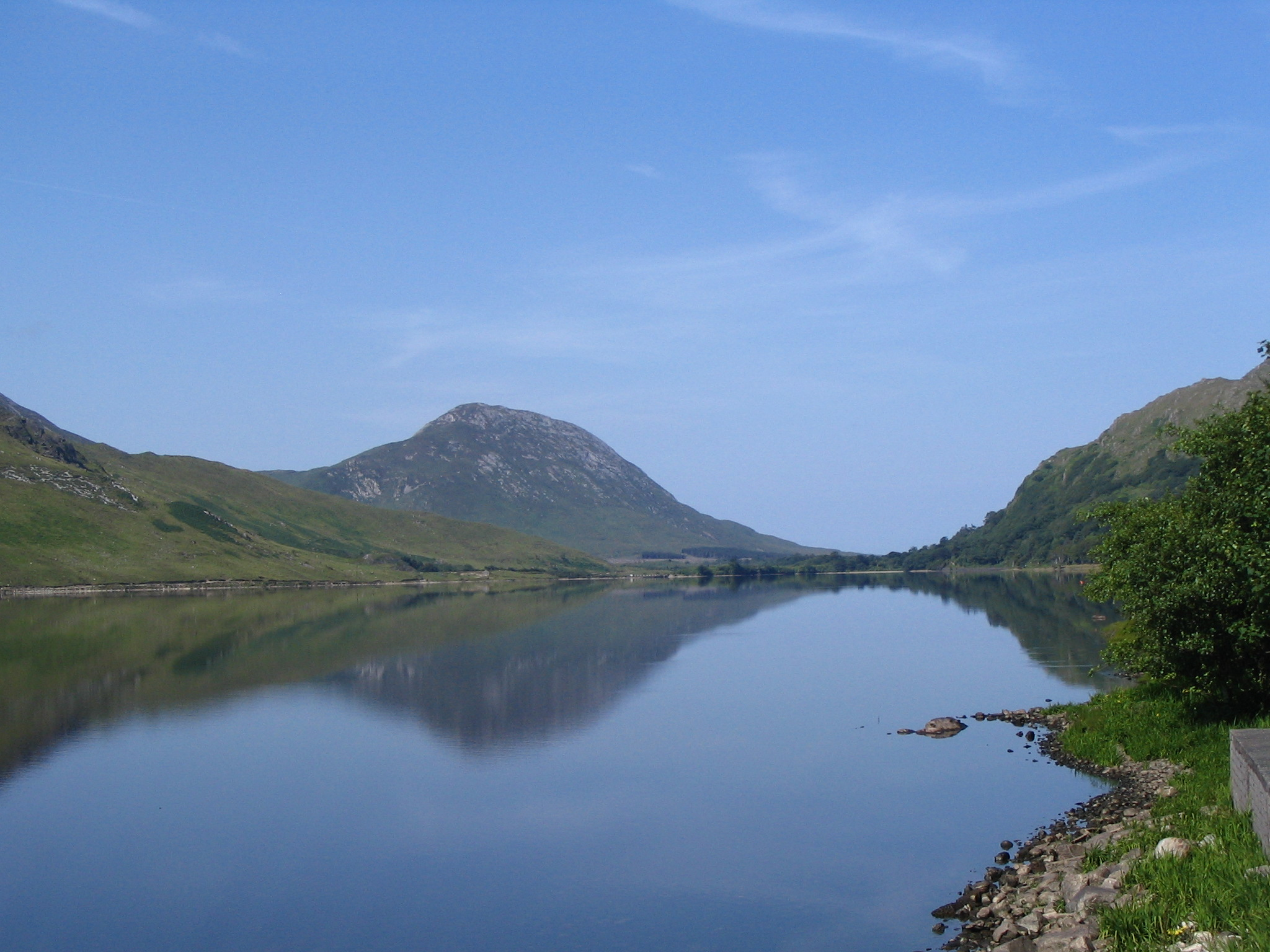
Kylemore Lough and Diamond Hill

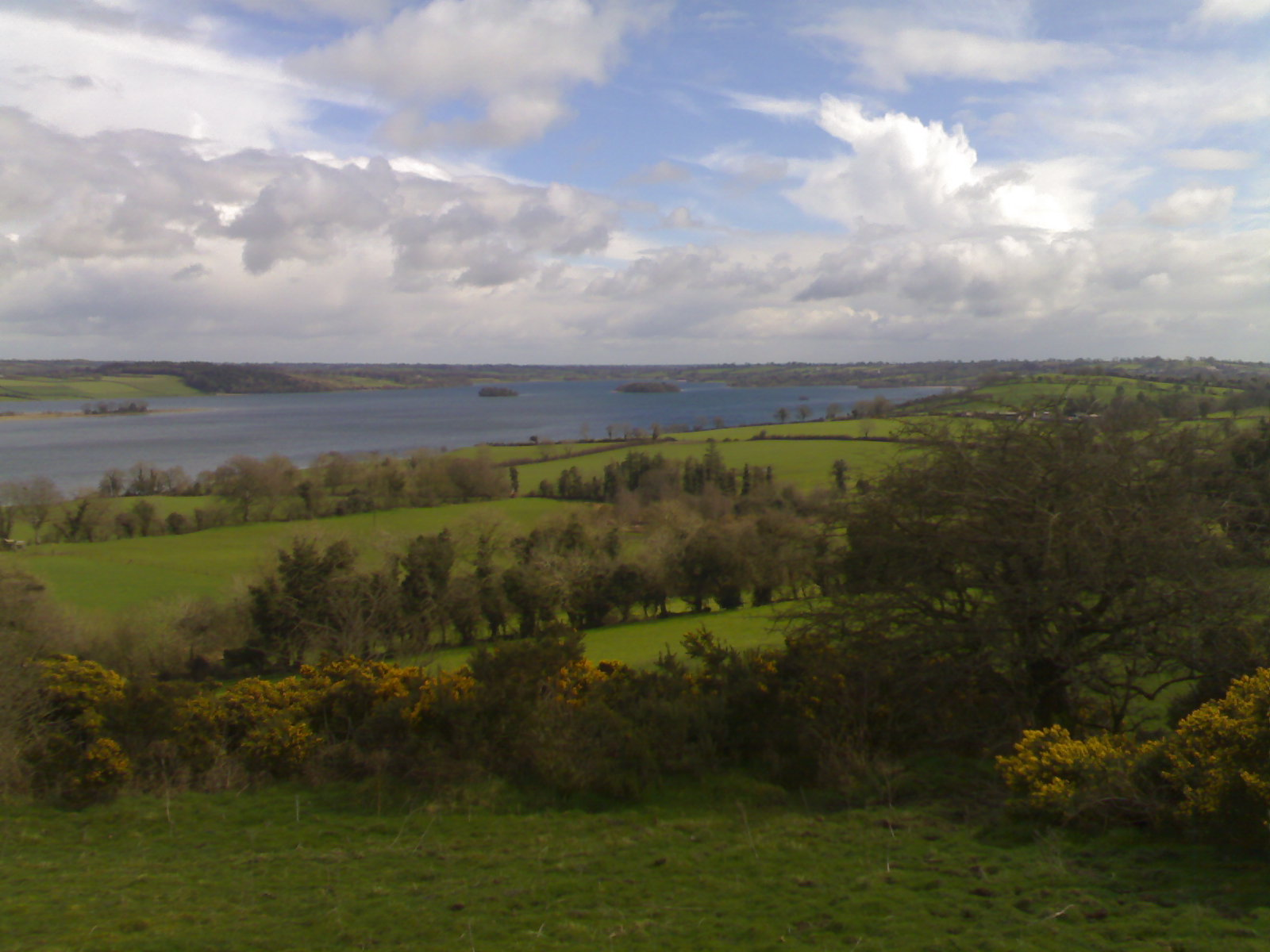
Lough Lene and Turgesius Island

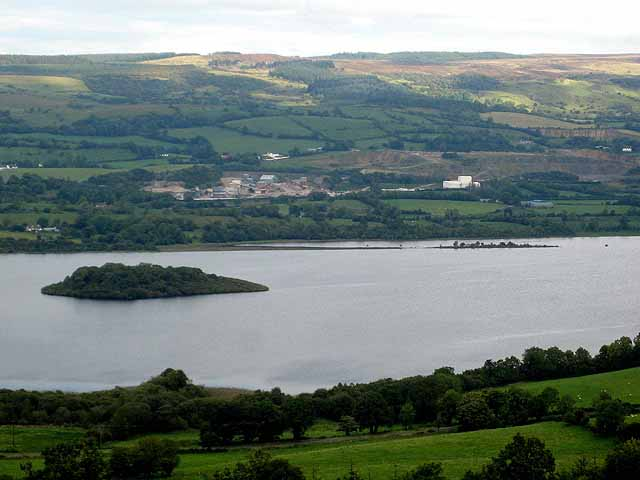
Lower Lough MacNean and Inishee Island

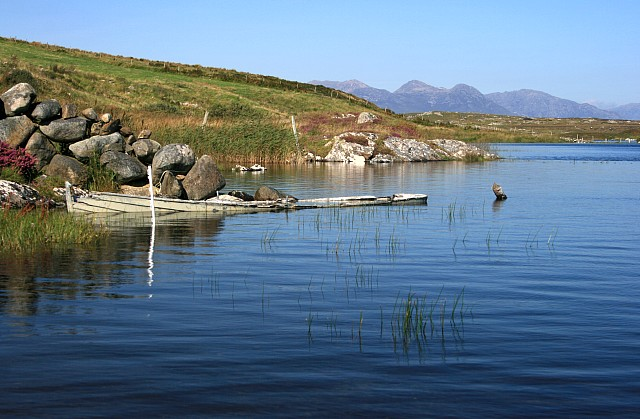
Maumeen Lough and the Twelve Bens

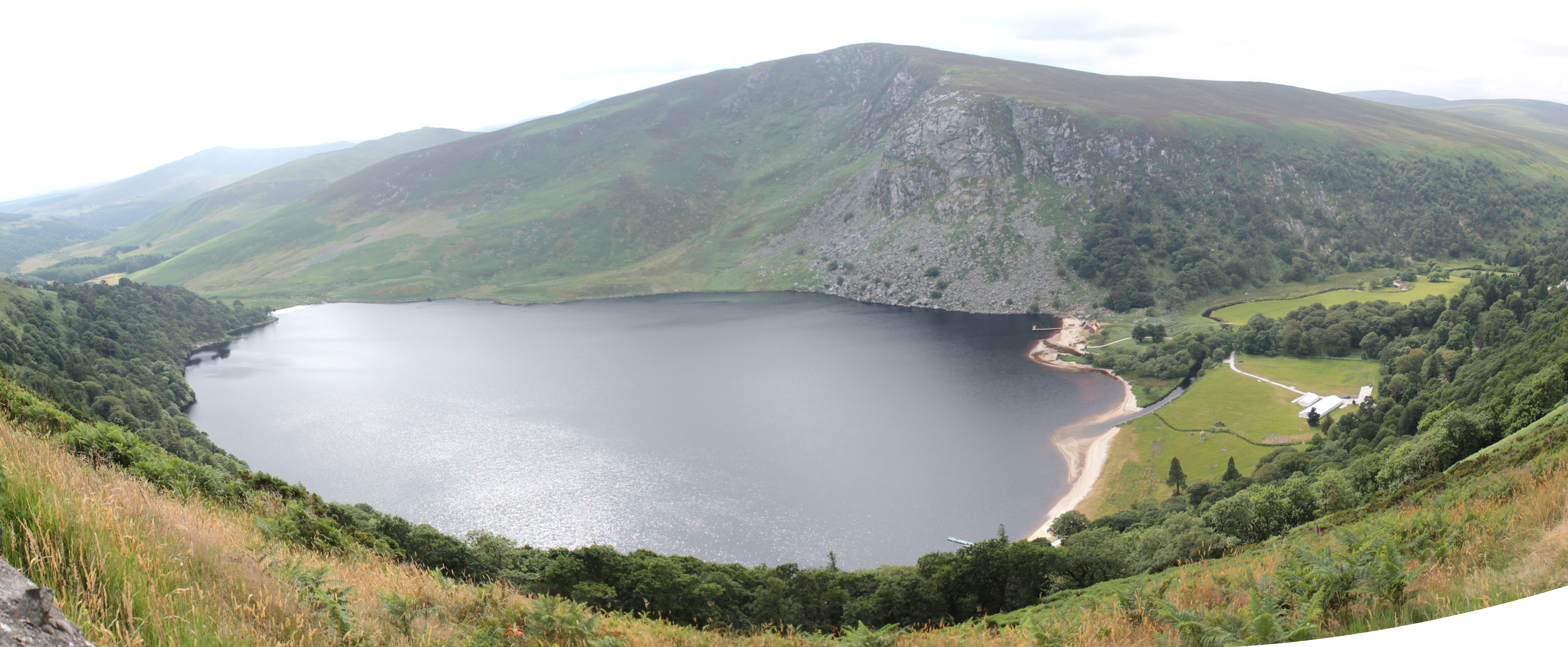
Lough Tay and the Wicklow Mountains

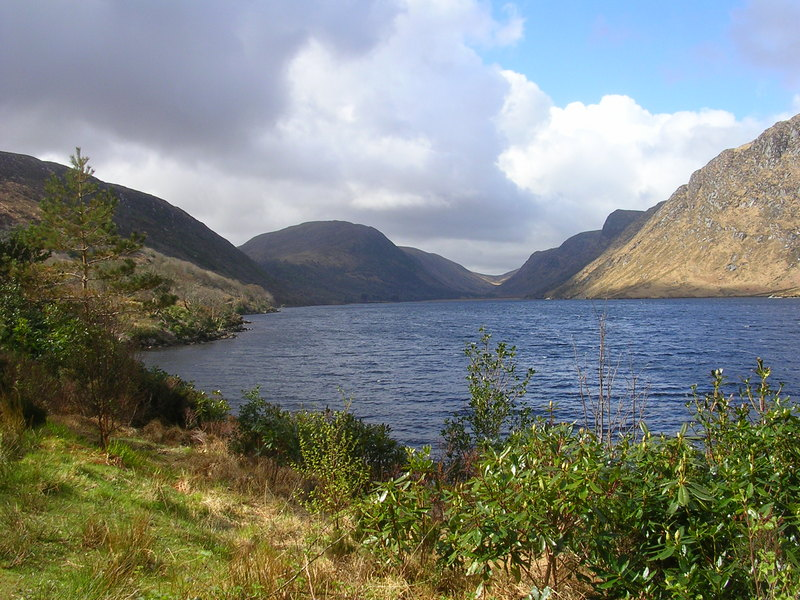
Lough Veagh in the Glenveagh Valley

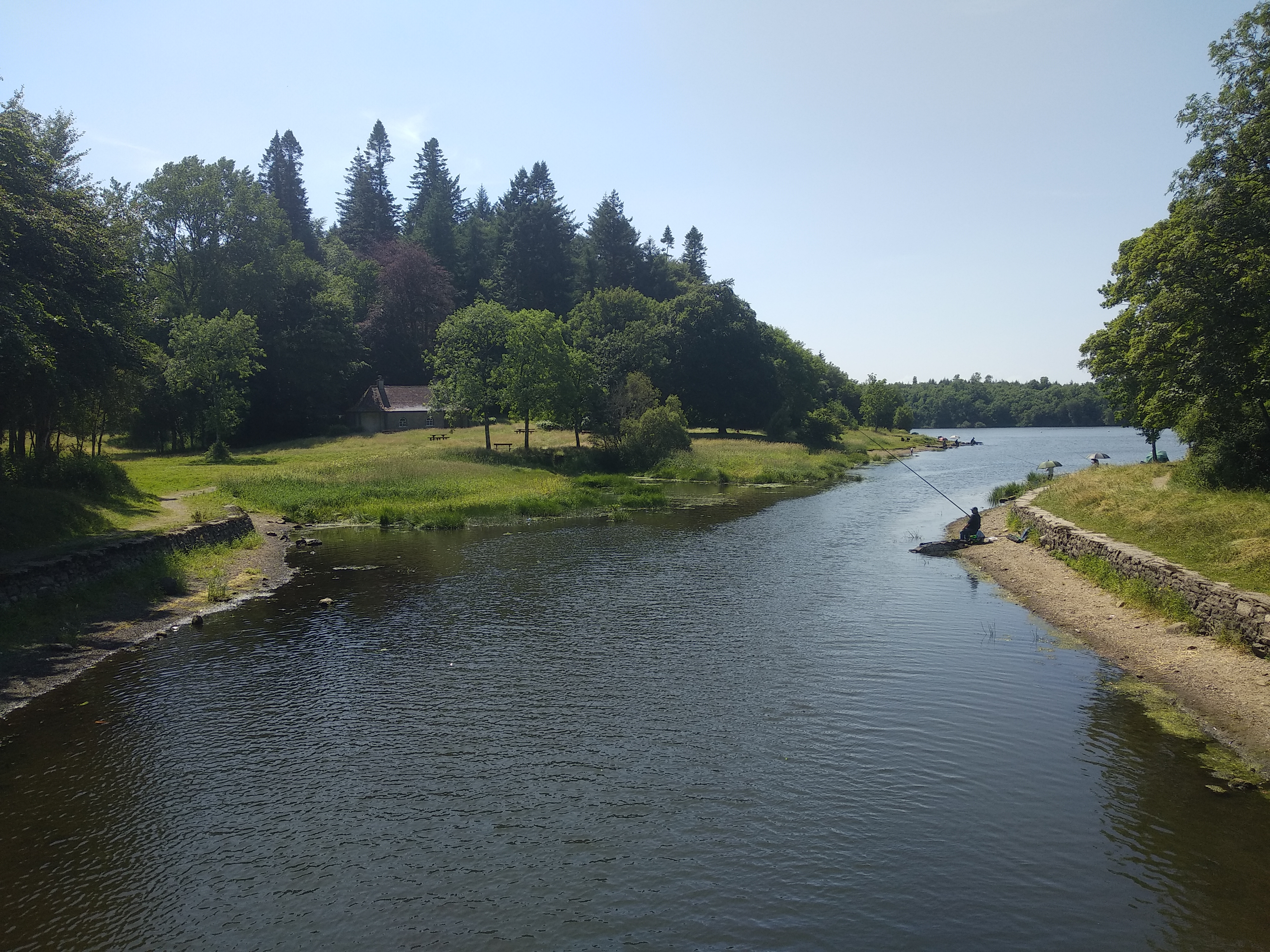
Lough Oughter at Killykeen

Lakes with the county/counties where they are situated and their area in square kilometres. Most of the Republic of Ireland lake areas are taken from the Environmental Protection Agency's A Reference based Typology and Ecological Assessment System for Irish Lakes (pp. 10–13)

Lake	County	Area (km^{2})	Area (sq mi)
Lough Acoose	County Kerry	0.66	0.25
Lough Aleck More	County Donegal	0.61	0.24
Lough Alewnaghta	County Clare and County Galway	0.55	0.21
Lough Allen	County Leitrim and County Roscommon	33.6	13.0
Lough Allua	County Cork	1.36	0.53
Lough Anaserd	County Galway	0.87	0.34
Annaghmore Lough	County Roscommon	0.53	0.20
Lough Anure	County Donegal	1.59	0.61
Ardderry Lough	County Galway	0.81	0.31
Lough Arrow	County Sligo and County Roscommon	12.47	4.81
Lough Atedaun	County Clare	0.38	0.15
Lough Atorick	County Clare	1	0.39
Aughrusbeg Lough	County Galway	0.5	0.19
Ballycuirke Lough	County Galway	0.74	0.29
Ballynahinch Lake	County Galway	1.7	0.66
Ballysaggart Lough	County Tyrone*		
Lough Bane	County Meath and Westmeath	0.75	0.29
Lough Barra	County Donegal	0.63	0.24
Lough Beg	County Londonderry and County Antrim*	4.7	1.8
Belhavel Lough	County Leitrim	1.01	0.39
Lough Beltra	County Mayo	4.1	1.6
Lough Boderg	County Roscommon and County Leitrim	5.1	2.0
Lough Bofin	County Galway	0.92	0.36
Lough Bofin	County Leitrim and County Roscommon	2.6	1.0
Lough Brackley	County Cavan	1.7	0.66
Lough Bunny	County Clare	1.03	0.40
Cam Lough	County Armagh	0.72	0.28
Caragh Lake	County Kerry	4.9	1.9
Lough Carra	County Mayo	15.6	6.0
Carrigadrohid Lake	County Cork	5.8	2.2
Carrickaport Lough	County Leitrim	0.46	0.18
Carrowmore Lake	County Mayo	9.3	3.6
Castlefore Lough	County Leitrim	0.21	0.081
Cavetown Lough	County Roscommon	0.64	0.25
Clea Lake	County Armagh*		
Cloonacleigha Lough	County Sligo	0.62	0.24
Cloonagh Lough	County Roscommon	0.71	0.27
Cloonaghlin Lough	County Kerry	1.28	0.49
Middle Cloonee Lough	County Kerry	0.71	0.27
Lough Conn	County Mayo	48.5	18.7
Lough Conway	County Leitrim	0.6	0.23
Lough Corrib	County Galway and County Mayo	172.9	66.8
Lough Corry	County Roscommon	1.5	0.58
Lough Craghy	County Donegal	0.5	0.19
Cross Lough	County Mayo	1.11	0.43
Lough Cullaun	County Clare	0.5	0.19
Lough Cullaunyheeda	County Clare	1.55	0.60
Lough Cullin	County Mayo	10.2	3.9
Lough Currane	County Kerry	10.4	4.0
Lough Cutra	County Galway	3.9	1.5
Lough Dan	County Wicklow	1	0.39
Glendalough Upper Lake	County Wicklow		
Lough Derg	Counties Clare, Galway and Tipperary	122.2	47.2
Lough Derg	County Donegal	8.8	3.4
Lough Derravaragh	County Westmeath	9.1	3.5
Derryclare Lough	County Galway	2.24	0.86
Doo Lough	County Clare	1.3	0.50
Doo Lough	County Mayo	1.55	0.60
Dromore Lough	County Clare	0.49	0.19
Drumaleague Lough	County Leitrim	0.05	0.019
Durnesh Lough	County Donegal	0.70	0.27
Lough Eidin (Drumharlow Lake)	County Roscommon	2.8	1.1
Dunglow Lough	County Donegal	0.61	0.24
Lough Dunlewey	County Donegal	1.1	0.42
Easky Lough	County Sligo	1.2	0.46
Lough Egish	County Monaghan	1.2	0.46
Enagh Lough	County Londonderry*		
Lough Ennell	County Westmeath	11.6	4.5
Lower Lough Erne	County Fermanagh*	109	42
Upper Lough Erne	County Fermanagh*	34	13
Errit Lough	County Roscommon	0.82	0.32
Lough Eske	County Donegal	3.8	1.5
Lough Fee	County Galway	1.74	0.67
Lough Feeagh	County Mayo	4	1.5
Lough Fern	County Donegal	1.81	0.70
Lough Finn	County Donegal	1.2	0.46
Lough Forbes	County Longford	3	1.2
Lough Funshinagh	County Roscommon	3.8	1.5
Lough Furnace	County Mayo	1.8	0.69
Lough Gara	County Sligo	12.6	4.9
Garadice Lough	County Leitrim	3.9	1.5
Gartan Lough	County Donegal	2.05	0.79
Lough Gill	County Sligo	13.8	5.3
Lough Gill	County Kerry	1.4	0.54
Glanmore Lake	County Kerry	0.57	0.22
Glen Lough	County Donegal	1.68	0.65
Glenade Lough	County Leitrim	0.7	0.27
Glenbeg Lough	County Cork	0.66	0.25
Glencar Lough	County Leitrim and County Sligo	1.2	0.46
Glendollagh Lough	County Galway	0.83	0.32
Lough Glenicmurrin	County Galway	1.7	0.66
Lough Golagh	County Donegal	0.6	0.23
Lough Gowna	County Cavan and County Longford	4.2	1.6
Lough Graney	County Clare	3.7	1.4
Lough Guitane	County Kerry	2.46	0.95
Lough Gullion	County Armagh	1.3	0.50
Lough Gur	County Limerick	0.8	0.31
Lough Inagh	County Galway	3.1	1.2
Inchicronan Lough	County Clare	1.2	0.46
Inchiquin Lough	County Clare	1.08	0.42
Inchiquin Lough	County Kerry	0.77	0.30
Lough Inniscarra	County Cork	4.9	1.9
Loughinisland	County Down*		
Lough Iron	County Westmeath		
Lough Island Reavy	County Down*	1	0.39
Islandeady Lough	County Mayo	1.39	0.54
Keshcarrigan Lough	County Leitrim	0.39	0.15
Lough Key	County Roscommon	8.9	3.4
Kilglass Lough	County Roscommon	2.02	0.78
Killinure Lough	County Westmeath	2.6	1.0
Kiltooris Lough	County Donegal	0.43	0.17
Lough Kinale	Counties Longford, Westmeath and Cavan	1.95	0.75
Kindrum Lough	County Donegal	0.61	0.24
Kylemore Lough	County Galway	1.32	0.51
Lady's Island Lake	County Wexford	3	1.2
Lough Leane	County Kerry	19.78	7.64
Lough Lene	County Westmeath	4.2	1.6
Lettercraffroe Lough	County Galway	0.82	0.32
Levally Lough	County Mayo	1.23	0.47
Lickeen Lough	County Clare	0.84	0.32
Lower Lough MacNean	County Fermanagh	4.6	1.8
Upper Lough MacNean	County Fermanagh*, County Cavan and County Leitrim	10	3.9
Lough Marrave	County Leitrim	0.1	0.039
Lough Mask	County Mayo and County Galway	83.4	32.2
Maumeen Lough	County Galway	0.56	0.22
Maumwee Lough	County Galway	0.28	0.11
Lough Meela	County Donegal	0.57	0.22
Lough Meelagh	County Roscommon	1.16	0.45
Lough Melvin	County Fermanagh* and County Leitrim	22.1	8.5
Lough Mourne	County Donegal	0.67	0.26
Muckanagh Lough	County Clare	0.96	0.37
Lough Muckno	County Monaghan	3.6	1.4
Muckross Lake	County Kerry	2.7	1.0
Lough Nacung Upper	County Donegal	2.1	0.81
Lough Nafooey	County Galway	2.5	0.97
Lough Neagh	Counties Antrim, Down, Armagh, Tyrone and Londonderry	396	153
Lough O'Flynn	County Roscommon	1.37	0.53
Lough Oughter	County Cavan	6.6	2.5
Lough Owel	County Westmeath	10.2	3.9
Poulaphouca Reservoir	County Wicklow	19.5	7.5
Portmore Lough	County Antrim*	2.86	1.10
Lough Ramor	County Cavan	7.1	2.7
Lough Rea	County Galway	3	1.2
Lough Ree	County Westmeath, County Longford and County Roscommon	106.1	41.0
Rinn Lough	County Leitrim	1.65	0.64
Ross Lake	County Galway	1.4	0.54
Lough Scur	County Leitrim	1.14	0.44
Lough Sheelin	County Cavan, County Meath and County Westmeath	18.2	7.0
Lough Sheever	County Westmeath		
Lough Shindilla	County Galway	0.7	0.27
Lough Sillan	County Cavan	1.6	0.62
Lough Skean	County Roscommon	1.14	0.44
St. John's Lough	County Leitrim	1.46	0.56
Tacumshin Lake	County Wexford	3.2	1.2
Lough Talt	County Sligo	1.1	0.42
Lough Tay	County Wicklow	0.5	0.19
Templehouse Lough	County Sligo	1.2	0.46
Upper Lake, Killarney	County Kerry	1.7	0.66
Upper Lough Skeagh	County Cavan	0.61	0.24
Urlaur Lough	County Mayo	1.15	0.44
Lough Veagh	County Donegal	2.61	1.01
White Lough	County Monaghan	0.54	0.21
Loughs Yganavan and Nambrackdarrig	County Kerry		

=== Brackish loughs ===
An example of a brackish lagoon is Lady's Island Lake, County Wexford

=== Turloughs ===
- Loughareema, County Antrim*
- Glenamaddy Turlough, County Galway
- Levally Lough, County Galway
- Rahasane Turlough, County Galway
- Shannon Pot, County Cavan

=== Reservoirs ===
- Poulaphouca Reservoir, County Wicklow
- Silent Valley Reservoir, County Down*
- Spelga Reservoir, County Down*
- Vartry Reservoir, County Wicklow

== Sea loughs ==
- Belfast Lough, between County Antrim and County Down*
- Strangford Lough, County Down*
- Lough Foyle, between County Donegal and County Londonderry*
- Galway Bay, County Galway
- Lough Hyne, County Cork
- Larne Lough, County Antrim*
- Lough Mahon, County Cork
- Shannon Estuary, Munster
- Tralee Bay, County Kerry
- Waterford Harbour, County Waterford
- Wexford Harbour, County Wexford

=== Fjords ===
- Carlingford Lough, between County Louth and County Down*
- Lough Swilly, County Donegal
- Killary Harbour, between County Mayo & County Galway

== See also ==
- Rivers of Ireland
- List of rivers of Ireland
- List of loughs of County Mayo
- Lake-burst
