= Black Lough =

Black Lough may refer to:

- Ballysaggart Lough, in Dungannon, County Tyrone, Northern Ireland
- Black Lough (Kerry) in the Gap of Dunloe, a mountain pass in County Kerry, Republic of Ireland
