= Gullion =

Gullion is a surname. Notable people with the surname include:

- Allen W. Gullion (1880–1946), American Army officer
- Blair Gullion (1901–1959), American basketball player
- Edmund A. Gullion (1913–1998), American diplomat
- Tom Gullion (born 1965), American jazz saxophonist

== See also ==
- Lough Gullion, is a lake in Northern Ireland
- Ring of Gullion, is a geological formation and area in County Armagh, Northern Ireland
- Slieve Gullion, is a mountain in the south of County Armagh, Northern Ireland
