= Glenicmurrin Lough =

Lake in County Galway, Ireland

- Loch Ghleann Mhac Muirinn (Irish)
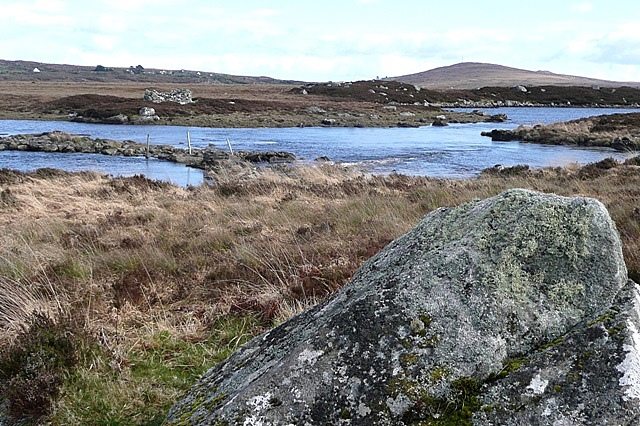
- Northern entrance of the lough.

- Location within Ireland
- Location: County Galway, Ireland
- Coordinates: 53.318398°N 9.500312°W
- Primary inflows: Loughnaskeha, Muckanagh Lough, Lough Cloonadoon
- Primary outflows: Cashla River
- Catchment area: 67.05 km^{2} (25.89 sq mi)
- Basin countries: Ireland
- Surface area: 1.65 km^{2} (0.64 sq mi)
- Shore length^{1}: 19 km (12 mi)
- Surface elevation: 28 m (92 ft)
- Islands: Holly Island, Rook Island, Rock Island, Fame Island
- ^{1} Shore length is not a well-defined measure.

Glenicmurrin Lough or Lough Glenicmurrin (Irish: Loch Ghleann Mhac Muirinn) is a lake in County Galway, Ireland.

== Wildlife ==
Fish on Glenicmurrin Lough include sea trout, brown trout, grilse and Arctic char.

== See also ==
- List of loughs in Ireland
