= Doo Lough =

Doo Lough, the name of a lake in Ireland, may refer to:

- Doo Lough, County Clare, a lake in County Clare
- Doo Lough, County Mayo, a lake in County Mayo on the Murrisk Peninsula
