= Belhavel Lough =

Lake in County Leitrim, Ireland

- Claonloch (Irish)
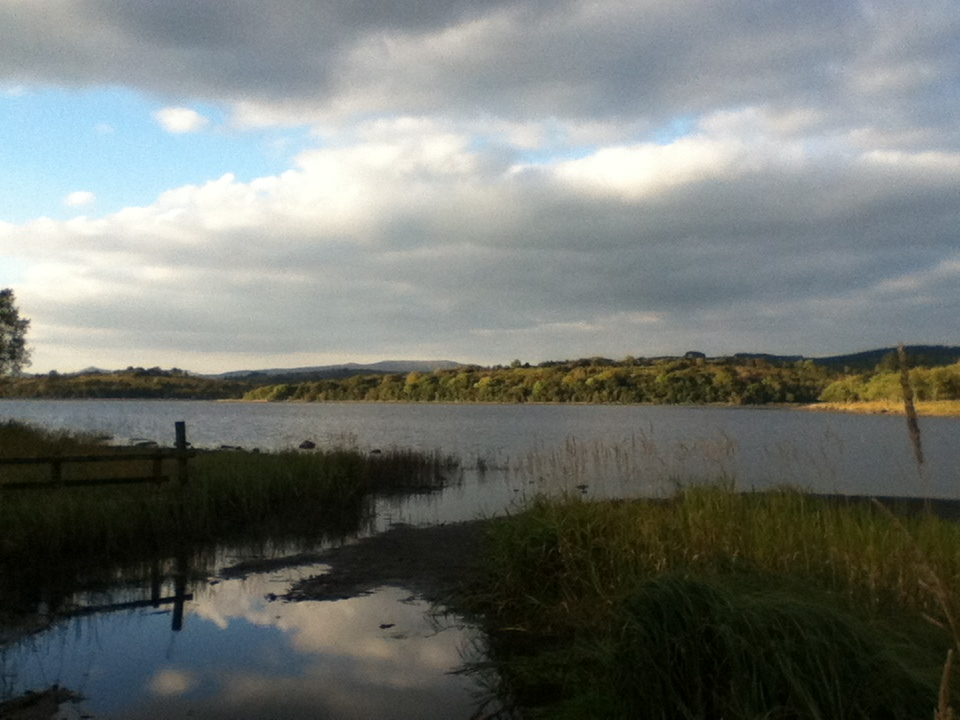

- Location in Ireland
- Location: County Leitrim
- Coordinates: 54°12′31″N 8°11′1″W
- Primary outflows: Diffagher River
- Catchment area: 22.24 km^{2} (8.6 sq mi)
- Basin countries: Ireland
- Surface area: 1.01 km^{2} (0.39 sq mi)
- Surface elevation: 60 m (200 ft)

Belhavel Lough (Irish: Claonloch, meaning 'crooked lake') is a freshwater lake in the northwest of Ireland. It is located in north County Leitrim near the village of Killarga.

== Geography and hydrology ==
Belhavel Lough is about 2 kilometres (1.2 mi) south of Killarga and 5 km (3.1 mi) north of Drumkeeran. It covers an area of 1.01 km^{2} (0.4 sq mi). The lake drains east into the Diffagher River, which eventually reaches Lough Allen.

== Ecology ==
The water quality was reported to be satisfactory c. 2001 – c. 2003 with a mesotrophic rating, (Note: Trophic states of "Oligotrophic" and "Mesotrophic" are desirable, but freshwater lakes rated 'Eutrophic' or 'Hypertrophic' indicates pollution.) but had a "poor" ecological status c. 2007 – c. 2009 indicating pollution, though Zebra mussel infestation was not reported. The ecology of Belhavel Lough, and other county waterways, is threatened by curly waterweed, zebra mussel, and freshwater clam invasive species.

== See also ==
- List of loughs in Ireland

== References and notes ==
=== Secondary sources ===
- Clenaghan, Conor; Clinton, Frank; Crowe, Matthew (2005). Phosphorus Regulations National Implementation Report (PDF) (Report). Environmental Protection Agency, Office of Environmental Enforcement.
- Pedreschi, D.; Kelly-Quinn, M.; Caffrey, J; O'Grady, M.; Mariani, S.; Phillimore, A. (2014). "Genetic structure of pike (Esox lucius) reveals a complex and previously unrecognized colonization history of Ireland". Journal of Biogeography. 41 (3): 548–560. doi:10.1111/jbi.12220. PMC 4238397. PMID 25435649.
- EPA (2010). Martin McGarrigle; John Lucey; Micheál Ó Cinnéide (eds.). Water Quality in Ireland 2007-2009 (PDF) (Report). EPA, Aquatic Environment Office of Environmental Assessment.
