= Maumwee Lough =

Lake in County Galway, Ireland

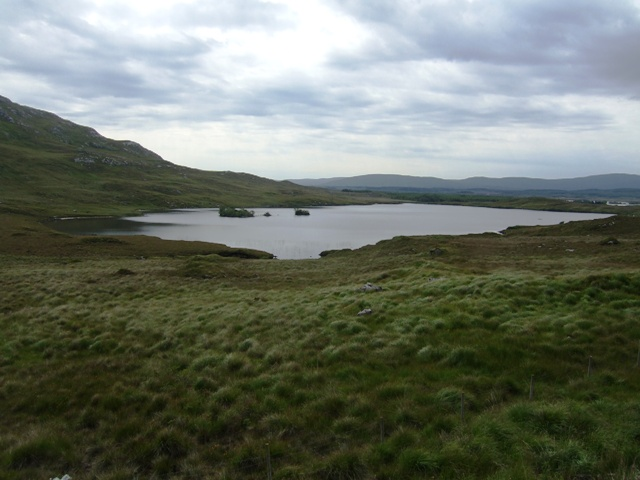

- Location in Ireland
- Location: County Galway
- Coordinates: 53.4772°N 9.5413°W
- Catchment area: 3.97 km^{2} (1.5 sq mi)
- Basin countries: Ireland
- Surface area: 0.28 km^{2} (0.11 sq mi)
- Average depth: 2.1 m (7 ft)
- Max. depth: 8.8 m (29 ft)
- Surface elevation: 46 m (151 ft)

Maumwee Lough is a freshwater lake in the Connemara area of County Galway, Ireland.

== Geography and hydrology ==
Maumwee Lough is about 2 kilometres (1.2 mi) north of Maam Cross and by the R336 road. The lake drains to the south and is part of the Corrib catchment.

== Natural history ==
Fish species in Maumwee Lough include brown trout, common minnow, salmon and the critically endangered European eel. Brown trout are the most abundant. Three-spined stickleback have sometimes been found in the lake. Maumwee Lough is part of the Maumturk Mountains Special Area of Conservation. This SAC also includes Lough Shindilla.

== See also ==
- List of loughs in Ireland
