= Lough Alewnaghta =

Lake in Mid-West Region of Ireland

- Location in Ireland
- Location: County Clare, County Galway
- Coordinates: 52°58′17″N 8°21′29″W
- Primary inflows: Derrainy River
- Primary outflows: Lough Derg
- Catchment area: 26.25 km^{2} (10.1 sq mi)
- Basin countries: Ireland
- Max. length: 1.3 km (0.8 mi)
- Max. width: 0.5 km (0.3 mi)
- Surface area: 0.55 km^{2} (0.21 sq mi)
- Average depth: 4 m (13 ft)
- Max. depth: 4.5 m (15 ft)
- Surface elevation: 31 m (102 ft)

Lough Alewnaghta is a freshwater lake in the Mid-West Region of Ireland. It is located in Counties Clare and Galway.

== Geography ==
Lough Alewnaghta measures about 1.5 km (0.9 mi) long and 0.5 km (0.3 mi) wide. It is about 23 km (14 mi) south of Portumna near the western shore of Lough Derg. The lake lies largely in County Clare with a smaller portion in County Galway.

== Natural history ==
Fish species in Lough Alewnaghta include perch, roach, bream, pike and the critically endangered European eel.

== See also ==
- List of loughs in Ireland
