= Lough Cullaunyheeda =

Freshwater lake in the Mid-West Region of Ireland

- Loch Choileáin Uí Shíoda (Irish)
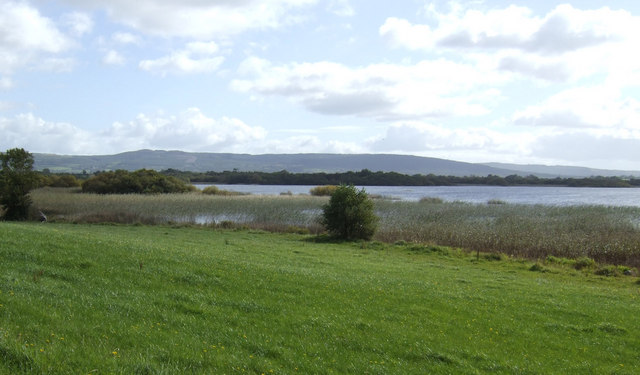

- Location in Ireland
- Location: County Clare
- Coordinates: 52°49′18″N 8°45′50″W
- Catchment area: 22.99 km^{2} (8.9 sq mi)
- Basin countries: Ireland
- Max. length: 1.9 km (1.2 mi)
- Max. width: 1.5 km (0.9 mi)
- Surface area: 1.55 km^{2} (0.60 sq mi)
- Surface elevation: 27 m (89 ft)

Lough Cullaunyheeda (Irish: Loch Choileáin Uí Shíoda) is a freshwater lake in the Mid-West Region of Ireland. It is located in east County Clare.

== Geography ==
Lough Cullaunyheeda measures about 2 km (1.2 mi) long and 1.5 km (0.9 mi) wide. It is located about 20 km (12 mi) east of Ennis.

== See also ==
- List of loughs in Ireland
