= Lough Sheever =

Lake in County Westmeath, Ireland

- Loch Siabhair (Irish)
- Location in Ireland
- Location: County Westmeath
- Coordinates: 53°32′44.31″N 7°18′33.89″W
- Basin countries: Ireland
- Surface area: 34 ha (84 acres)
- Surface elevation: 94 m (308 ft)

Lough Sheever (Irish: Loch Siabhair) is a small lake near Mullingar, County Westmeath, Ireland. It is located off the Castlepollard road about 3 kilometres (1.9 mi) from Mullingar. The lake is popular with anglers, (coarse fishing) for roach, perch, tench, etc. Boat hire is available.

== See also ==
- List of loughs in Ireland
