= Aughrusbeg Lough =

Freshwater lake in the west of Ireland

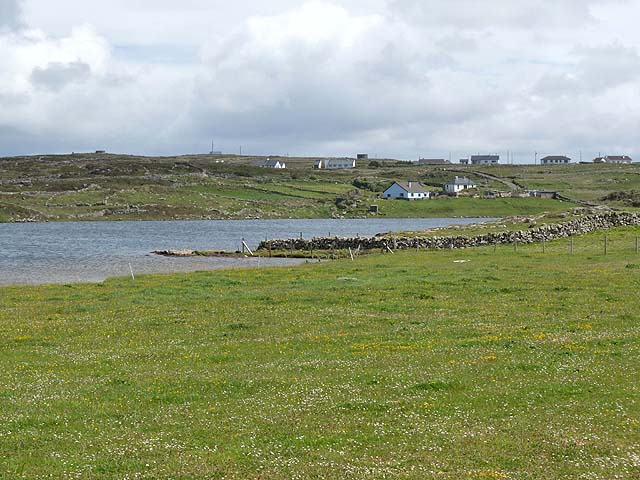

- Location in Ireland
- Location: County Galway
- Coordinates: 53°33′15″N 10°10′39″W
- Catchment area: 1.69 km^{2} (0.7 sq mi)
- Basin countries: Ireland
- Max. length: 1.4 km (0.9 mi)
- Max. width: 0.6 km (0.4 mi)
- Surface area: 0.5 km^{2} (0.19 sq mi)
- Max. depth: 14 m (46 ft)
- Surface elevation: 8 m (26 ft)

Aughrusbeg Lough is a freshwater lake in the west of Ireland. It is located in the Connemara area in west County Galway.

== Geography and hydrology ==
Aughrusbeg Lough lies about 15 km (9 mi) northwest of Clifden near the village of Cleggan. The lake is oligotrophic.

== Natural history ==
Fish species in Aughrusbeg Lough include three-spined stickleback, rudd, brown trout and the critically endangered European eel. The lake is part of the Aughrusbeg Machair and Lake Special Area of Conservation.

== See also ==
- List of loughs in Ireland
