= White Lough =

Freshwater lake in the northeast of Ireland

- Location in Ireland
- Location: County Monaghan
- Coordinates: 54°6′48″N 6°58′30″W
- Primary inflows: Dromore River
- Primary outflows: Dromore River
- Catchment area: 132.38 km^{2} (51.1 sq mi)
- Basin countries: Ireland
- Max. length: 2.4 km (1.5 mi)
- Max. width: 0.4 km (0.2 mi)
- Surface area: 0.54 km^{2} (0.21 sq mi)
- Max. depth: 6 m (20 ft)
- Surface elevation: 75 m (246 ft)

White Lough, also known as White Lake and Bairds Shore, is a freshwater lake in the northeast of Ireland. It is located in County Monaghan in the catchment of the River Erne. The lake is also used as a raw water source for Stranooden Group Water Scheme.

== Geography ==
White Lough measures about 2.5 km (1.6 mi) long west–east and 0.5 km (0.3 mi) wide. It is located about 5 km (3 mi) southwest of Ballybay.

== Natural history ==
Fish species in White Lough include perch, roach, pike, tench and the critically endangered European eel.

== See also ==
- List of loughs in Ireland
