= Glanmore Lake =

Lake in County Kerry, Ireland

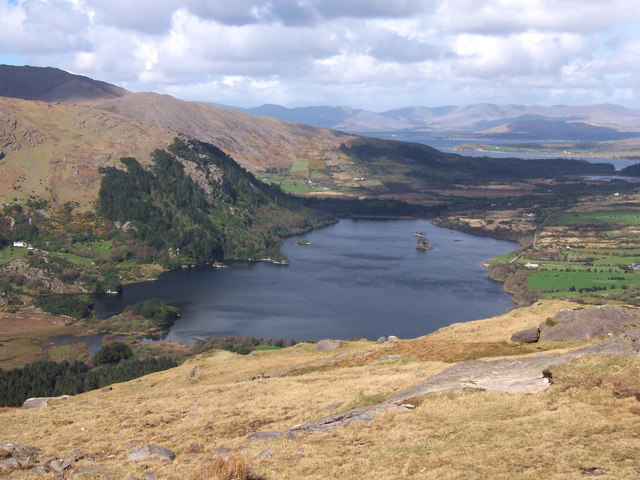

- Location in Ireland
- Location: County Kerry
- Coordinates: 51°43′59″N 9°46′19″W
- Primary outflows: Croansaght River
- Catchment area: 24.44 km^{2} (9.4 sq mi)
- Basin countries: Ireland
- Max. length: 1.25 km (0.8 mi)
- Max. width: 0.5 km (0.3 mi)
- Surface area: 0.57 km^{2} (0.22 sq mi)
- Surface elevation: 8 m (26 ft)

Glanmore Lake is a freshwater lake in the southwest of Ireland. It is located on the Beara Peninsula in County Kerry.

== Geography ==
Glanmore Lake measures about 1 km (0.6 mi) long north–south and 0.5 km (0.3 mi) wide. It lies about 28 km (17 mi) southwest of Kenmare, near the village of Lauragh.

== Hydrology and natural history ==
Glanmore Lake drains into the Croansaght River, which in turn flows to Kenmare Bay. The lake is a salmon and sea trout fishing destination.

== See also ==
- List of loughs in Ireland
