= Inchicronan Lough =

Freshwater lake in County Clare, Ireland

- Loch Inse Chrónáin (Irish)
- Location in Ireland
- Location: County Clare
- Coordinates: 52°55′17″N 8°54′20″W
- Primary outflows: Millbrooks River
- Basin countries: Ireland
- Max. length: 2.5 km (1.6 mi)
- Max. width: 0.6 km (0.4 mi)
- Surface area: 1.2 km^{2} (0.46 sq mi)
- Max. depth: 18.8 m (62 ft)

Inchicronan Lough (Irish: Loch Inse Chrónáin) is a freshwater lake in County Clare within the Mid-West Region of Ireland.

== Geography ==
Inchicronan Lough measures about 2.5 km (1.6 mi) long and 0.5 km (0.3 mi) wide. It is about 10 km (6 mi) north of Ennis near the village of Crusheen.

== Natural history ==
Fish species in Inchicronan Lough include perch, rudd, pike and the critically endangered European eel. The lake and its surroundings have a range of important habitats and species.

== See also ==
- List of loughs in Ireland
