= Kilglass Lough =

Lake in Ireland

- Loch Chill Ghlais (Irish)
- Location in Ireland
- Location: County Roscommon
- Coordinates: 53°49′32″N 8°1′45″W
- Catchment area: 230.3 km^{2} (88.9 sq mi)
- Basin countries: Ireland
- Max. length: 3.8 km (2.4 mi)
- Max. width: 0.9 km (0.6 mi)
- Surface area: 2.02 km^{2} (0.78 sq mi)
- Surface elevation: 38 m (125 ft)

Kilglass Lough (Irish: Loch Chill Ghlais) is a freshwater lake in the west of Ireland. It is located in north County Roscommon.

== Geography ==
Kilglass Lough measures about 4 km (2.5 mi) long and 1 km (0.6 mi) wide. It is located about 10 km (6 mi) northeast of Strokestown. The lake is part of a system of lakes collectively known as the Strokestown Lakes.

== Natural history ==
Fish species in Kilglass Lough include pike, bream, roach, tench and rudd.

== See also ==
- List of loughs in Ireland
