= Lough Aleck More =

Lake in County Donegal, Ireland

- Loch an Leaca Mór (Irish)
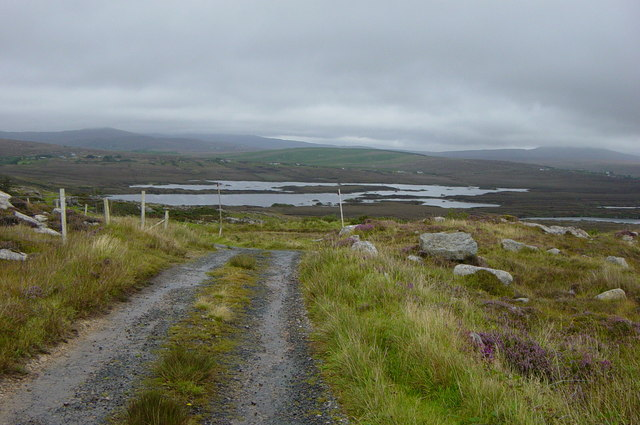

- Location in Ireland
- Location: County Donegal
- Coordinates: 54°55′0″N 8°21′56″W
- Catchment area: 7.66 km^{2} (3.0 sq mi)
- Basin countries: Ireland
- Max. length: 1.3 km (1 mi)
- Max. width: 0.7 km (0.4 mi)
- Surface area: 0.61 km^{2} (0.24 sq mi)
- Surface elevation: 10 m (33 ft)

Lough Aleck More (Irish: Loch an Leaca Mór) is a freshwater lake in the northwest of Ireland. It is located in County Donegal in the Rosses fishery.

== Geography and natural history ==
Lough Aleck More is 6 kilometres (3.7 mi) south of Dungloe. It measures about 1.5 km (1 mi) long north–south and 0.5 km (0.3 mi) wide. The lake is a trout fishing destination with resident brown trout and seasonal sea trout.

== See also ==
- List of loughs in Ireland
