= Cavetown Lough =

Freshwater lake in the west of Ireland

- Loch Bhaile na hUamha (Irish)
- Location in Ireland
- Location: County Roscommon
- Coordinates: 53°55′30″N 8°15′30″W
- Primary outflows: Clogher Lake
- Catchment area: 9.06 km^{2} (3.5 sq mi)
- Basin countries: Ireland
- Max. length: 1.5 km (0.9 mi)
- Max. width: 0.7 km (0.4 mi)
- Surface area: 0.64 km^{2} (0.25 sq mi)
- Max. depth: 20 m (66 ft)
- Surface elevation: 82 m (269 ft)

Cavetown Lough (Irish: Loch Bhaile na hUamha) is a freshwater lake in the west of Ireland. It is located in County Roscommon in the catchment of the upper River Shannon.

== Geography ==
Cavetown Lough measures about 1.5 km (0.9 mi) long and 0.5 km (0.3 mi) wide. It is located about 8 km (5 mi) south of Boyle and 9 km (6 mi) west of Carrick-on-Shannon.

== Natural history ==
Fish species in Cavetown Lough include perch, roach, pike, bream and the critically endangered European eel. The lake was previously also a trout fishing destination.

== See also ==
- List of loughs in Ireland
