= Lough Corry =

Lake in Ireland

- Loch An Choraidh (Irish)
- Location within Ireland
- Location: County Leitrim/County Roscommon, Ireland
- Coordinates: 53.923707°N 8.085184°W
- Primary inflows: River Shannon
- Primary outflows: River Shannon
- Basin countries: Ireland
- Surface area: 1.5 km^{2} (0.58 sq mi)
- Surface elevation: 43 m (141 ft)
- Islands: Inishmucker, Crose's Islands

Lough Corry is a lake in Ireland, located on the River Shannon.

== Wildlife ==
Lough Corry is a fishery for brown trout.

== See also ==
- List of loughs in Ireland
