= Lettercraffroe Lough =

Freshwater lake in the west of Ireland

- Location in Ireland
- Location: County Galway
- Coordinates: 53°22′50″N 9°25′18″W
- Catchment area: 4.25 km^{2} (1.6 sq mi)
- Basin countries: Ireland
- Max. length: 1.6 km (1.0 mi)
- Max. width: 0.9 km (0.6 mi)
- Surface area: 0.82 km^{2} (0.32 sq mi)
- Average depth: 2.86 m (9 ft 5 in)
- Max. depth: 17.9 m (59 ft)
- Surface elevation: 160 m (520 ft)

Lettercraffroe Lough is a freshwater lake in the west of Ireland. It is located in the Connemara area of County Galway.

== Geography ==
Lettercraffroe Lough measures about 2 km (1.2 mi) long and 1 km (0.6 mi) wide. It is located about 10 km (6 mi) southwest of Oughterard and about 40 km (25 mi) northwest of Galway city.

== Natural history ==
Fish species in Lettercraffroe Lough include roach, brown trout and three-spined stickleback. Lettercraffroe Lough is part of the Connemara Bog Complex Special Area of Conservation.

== See also ==
- List of loughs in Ireland
