= Kiltooris Lough =

Lake in County Donegal, Ireland

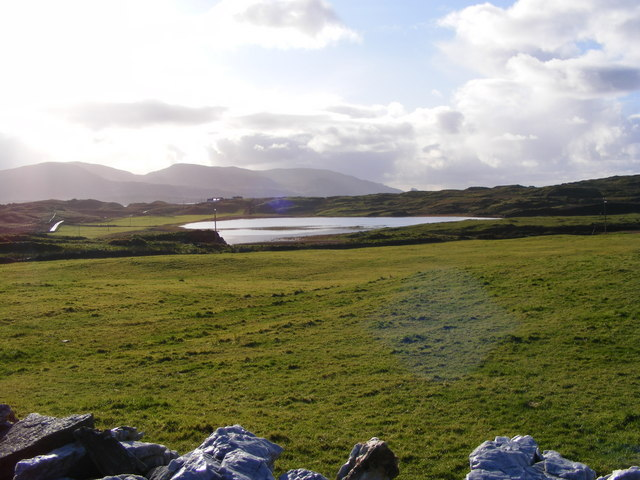

- Location in Ireland
- Location: County Donegal
- Coordinates: 54°49′9″N 8°30′2″W
- Catchment area: 5.55 km^{2} (2.1 sq mi)
- Basin countries: Ireland
- Max. length: 1.4 km (1 mi)
- Max. width: 0.5 km (0.3 mi)
- Surface area: 0.43 km^{2} (0.17 sq mi)
- Max. depth: 13.5 m (44 ft)
- Surface elevation: 7 m (23 ft)
- Islands: Inishywadigan, Rossbeg Island, Thorn Island, O'Boyle's Island

Kiltooris Lough is a freshwater lake in the northwest of Ireland. It is located in southwest County Donegal near Dawros Bay.

== Geography and hydrology ==
Kiltooris Lough is about 8 kilometres (5 mi) northwest of Ardara. It measures about 1.5 km (1 mi) long north–south and 0.5 km (0.3 mi) wide. Kiltooris Lough is oligotrophic.

== Natural history ==
Fish species in Kiltooris Lough include salmon, three-spined stickleback and the critically endangered European eel. Kiltooris Lough is part of the West of Ardara/Maas Road Special Area of Conservation.

== See also ==
- List of loughs in Ireland
