= Cloonaghlin Lough =

Lake in County Kerry, Ireland

- Loch Oileán Uí Eadhna (Irish)
- Location in Ireland
- Location: County Kerry
- Coordinates: 51°52′27″N 10°1′11″W
- Primary outflows: Lough Namona
- Catchment area: 10.24 km^{2} (4.0 sq mi)
- Basin countries: Ireland
- Max. length: 2.2 km (1.4 mi)
- Max. width: 0.8 km (0.5 mi)
- Surface area: 1.28 km^{2} (0.49 sq mi)
- Surface elevation: 109 m (358 ft)

Cloonaghlin Lough (Irish: Loch Oileán Uí Eadhna) is a freshwater lake in the southwest of Ireland. It is located on the Iveragh Peninsula in County Kerry.

== Geography ==
Cloonaghlin Lough measures about 2 km (1.2 mi) long and 1 km (0.6 mi) wide. It is located about 15 km (9 mi) northeast of Waterville.

== Hydrology ==
Cloonaghlin Lough drains into its smaller neighbour Lough Namona. This lake in turn drains into the Owengarriff River which joins the Cummeragh River.

== Natural history ==
Fish species in Cloonaghlin Lough include salmon and sea trout. Salmon runs are dependent on high water levels in the Owengarriff and Cummeragh rivers.

== See also ==
- List of loughs in Ireland
