= Cloonagh Lough =

Lake in County Roscommon, Ireland

- Location in Ireland
- Location: County Roscommon
- Coordinates: 53°49′45″N 8°41′24″W
- Catchment area: 47.93 km^{2} (18.5 sq mi)
- Basin countries: Ireland
- Max. length: 2.0 km (1.2 mi)
- Max. width: 0.5 km (0.3 mi)
- Surface area: 0.71 km^{2} (0.27 sq mi)
- Surface elevation: 81 m (266 ft)

Cloonagh Lough is a freshwater lake in the west of Ireland. It is located in west County Roscommon in the catchment of the Boyle River.

== Geography and natural history ==
Cloonagh Lough is located about 12 km (7 mi) northeast of Ballyhaunis. The north shore of the lake is part of the Derrinea Bog Special Area of Conservation.

== See also ==
- List of loughs in Ireland
