= Lough Atorick =

Lake in County Clare, Ireland

- Loch an Tóraic (Irish)
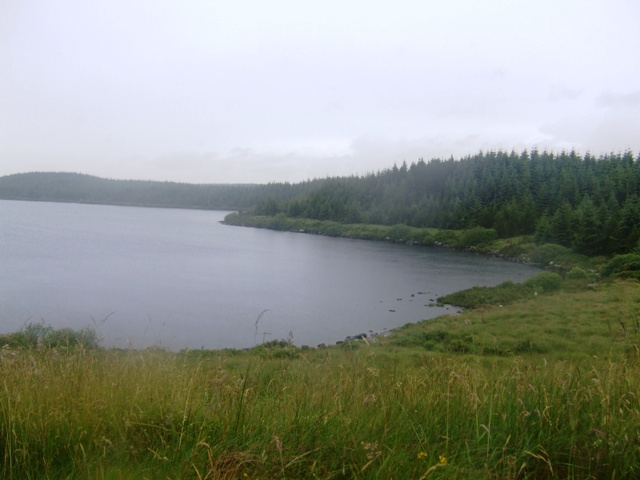

- Location within island of Ireland
- Location: County Clare
- Coordinates: 53.018182°N 8.550411°W
- Primary inflows: Bleach River
- Primary outflows: Bleach River
- Basin countries: Ireland
- Surface area: 1 km^{2} (0.39 sq mi)
- Surface elevation: 140 m (460 ft)

Lough Atorick (Irish: Loch an Tóraic) is a lake in County Clare, Ireland.

== See also ==
- List of loughs in Ireland
