= Glendollagh Lough =

Lake in County Galway, Ireland

- Loch Ghleann Dá Loch (Irish)
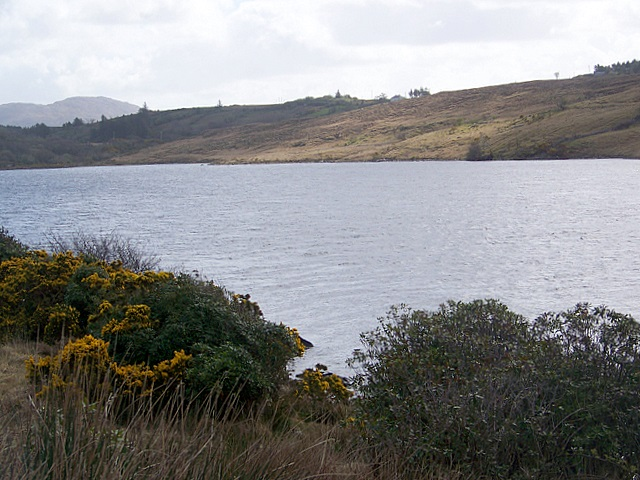

- Location in Ireland
- Location: County Galway
- Coordinates: 53°27′56″N 9°43′53″W
- Catchment area: 49.61 km^{2} (19.2 sq mi)
- Basin countries: Ireland
- Max. length: 2.1 km (1.3 mi)
- Max. width: 0.5 km (0.3 mi)
- Surface area: 0.83 km^{2} (0.32 sq mi)
- Surface elevation: 16 m (52 ft)

Glendollagh Lough (Irish: Loch Ghleann Dá Loch), also known as Garrowman Lough, is a freshwater lake in the west of Ireland. It is located in the Connemara area of County Galway.

== Geography and natural history ==
Glendollagh Lough is located along the N59 road about 20 km (12 mi) east of Clifden, near the village of Recess. The lake is part of the Connemara Bog Complex Special Area of Conservation.

== See also ==
- List of loughs in Ireland
