= Glenbeg Lough =

Lake in County Cork, Ireland

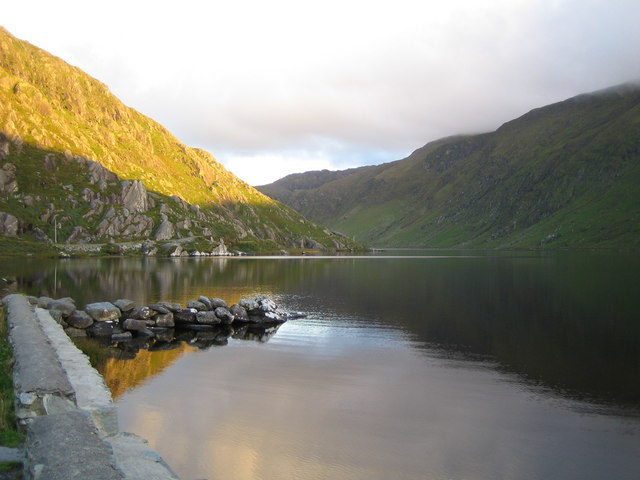

- Location in Ireland
- Location: County Cork
- Coordinates: 51°42′52″N 9°52′20″W
- Primary outflows: Ownagappul River
- Catchment area: 7.58 km^{2} (2.9 sq mi)
- Basin countries: Ireland
- Max. length: 2 km (1.2 mi)
- Max. width: 0.4 km (0.2 mi)
- Surface area: 0.66 km^{2} (0.25 sq mi)
- Average depth: 4 m (13 ft)
- Max. depth: 13 m (43 ft)
- Surface elevation: 78 m (256 ft)

Glenbeg Lough is a freshwater lake in the southwest of Ireland. It is located on the Beara Peninsula in County Cork.

== Geography ==
Glenbeg Lough measures about 2 km (1.2 mi) long and 0.5 km (0.3 mi) wide. It lies about 40 km (25 mi) southwest of Kenmare, near the village of Ardgroom.

== Hydrology ==
Glenbeg Lough drains into the Ownagappul River, which in turn enters Kenmare Bay at Cappul. The lake is oligotrophic.

== Natural history ==
Fish species in Glenbeg Lough include brown trout, salmon and the critically endangered European eel. The lake is part of the Glanmore Bog Special Area of Conservation.

== See also ==
- List of loughs in Ireland
