= Maumeen Lough =

Freshwater lake in the west of Ireland

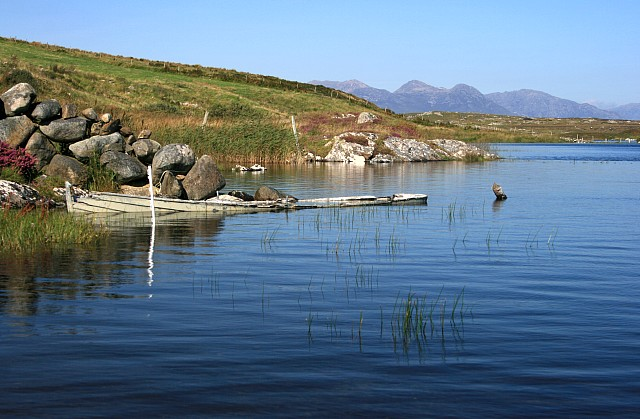
- With the Twelve Bens in the background

- Location in Ireland
- Location: County Galway
- Coordinates: 53°24′13″N 10°1′11″W
- Catchment area: 2.28 km^{2} (0.9 sq mi)
- Basin countries: Ireland
- Max. length: 1.4 km (0.9 mi)
- Max. width: 0.5 km (0.3 mi)
- Surface area: 0.56 km^{2} (0.22 sq mi)
- Surface elevation: 5 m (16 ft)

Maumeen Lough is a freshwater lake in the west of Ireland. It is located in the Connemara area of County Galway.

== Geography and natural history ==
Maumeen Lough is located along the R341 road about 15 km (9 mi) south of Clifden and about 10 km (6 mi) west of the village of Roundstone. The lake is part of the Connemara Bog Complex Special Area of Conservation.

== See also ==
- List of loughs in Ireland
