= Upper Lough Skeagh =

Lake in County Cavan, Ireland

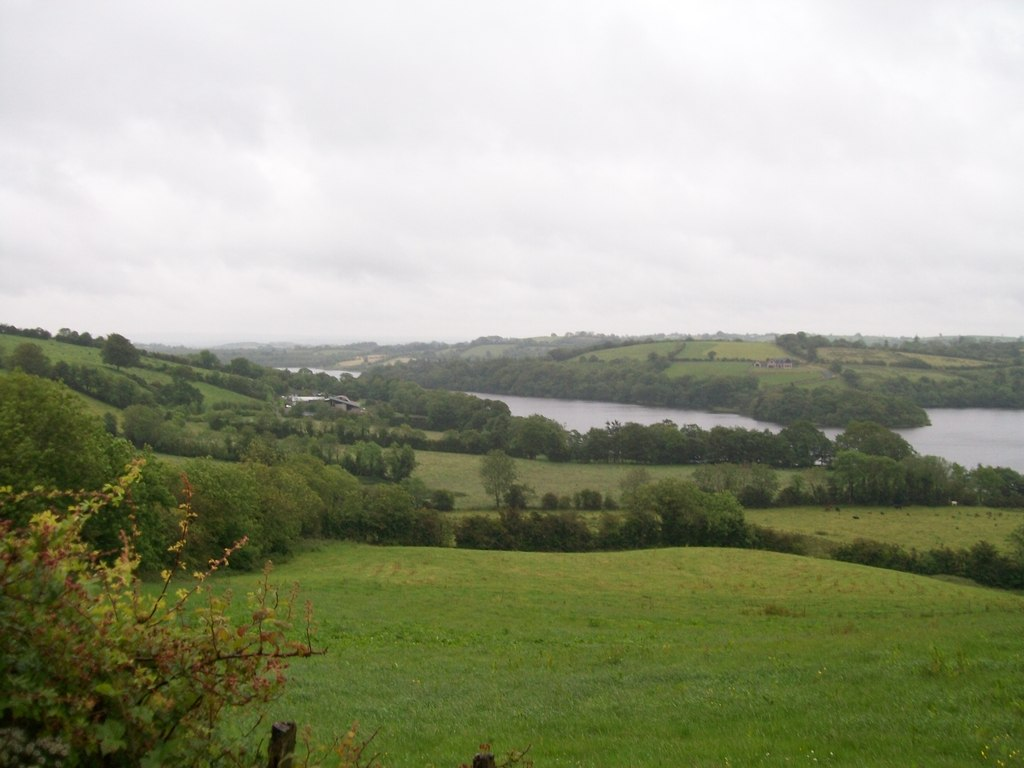
- Looking north along Upper Lough Skeagh

- Location in Ireland
- Location: County Cavan
- Coordinates: 53°57′15″N 7°0′38″W
- Catchment area: 4.09 km^{2} (1.6 sq mi)
- Basin countries: Ireland
- Max. length: 2.0 km (1.2 mi)
- Max. width: 0.5 km (0.3 mi)
- Surface area: 0.61 km^{2} (0.24 sq mi)
- Max. depth: 4.9 m (16 ft)
- Surface elevation: 150 m (490 ft)

Upper Lough Skeagh is a freshwater lake in the northeast of Ireland. It is located in County Cavan in the catchment of the River Boyne.

== Geography ==
Upper Lough Skeagh measures about 2 km (1.2 mi) long north–south and 0.5 km (0.3 mi) wide. It is located about 7 km (4 mi) northwest of Bailieborough.

== Natural history ==
Fish species in Upper Lough Skeagh include roach, perch, bream, pike, and the critically endangered European eel. The lake is also a public water supply.

== See also ==
- List of loughs in Ireland
