= Cloonee Lough =

Lakes in County Kerry, Ireland

- Locha Chluain Í (Irish)
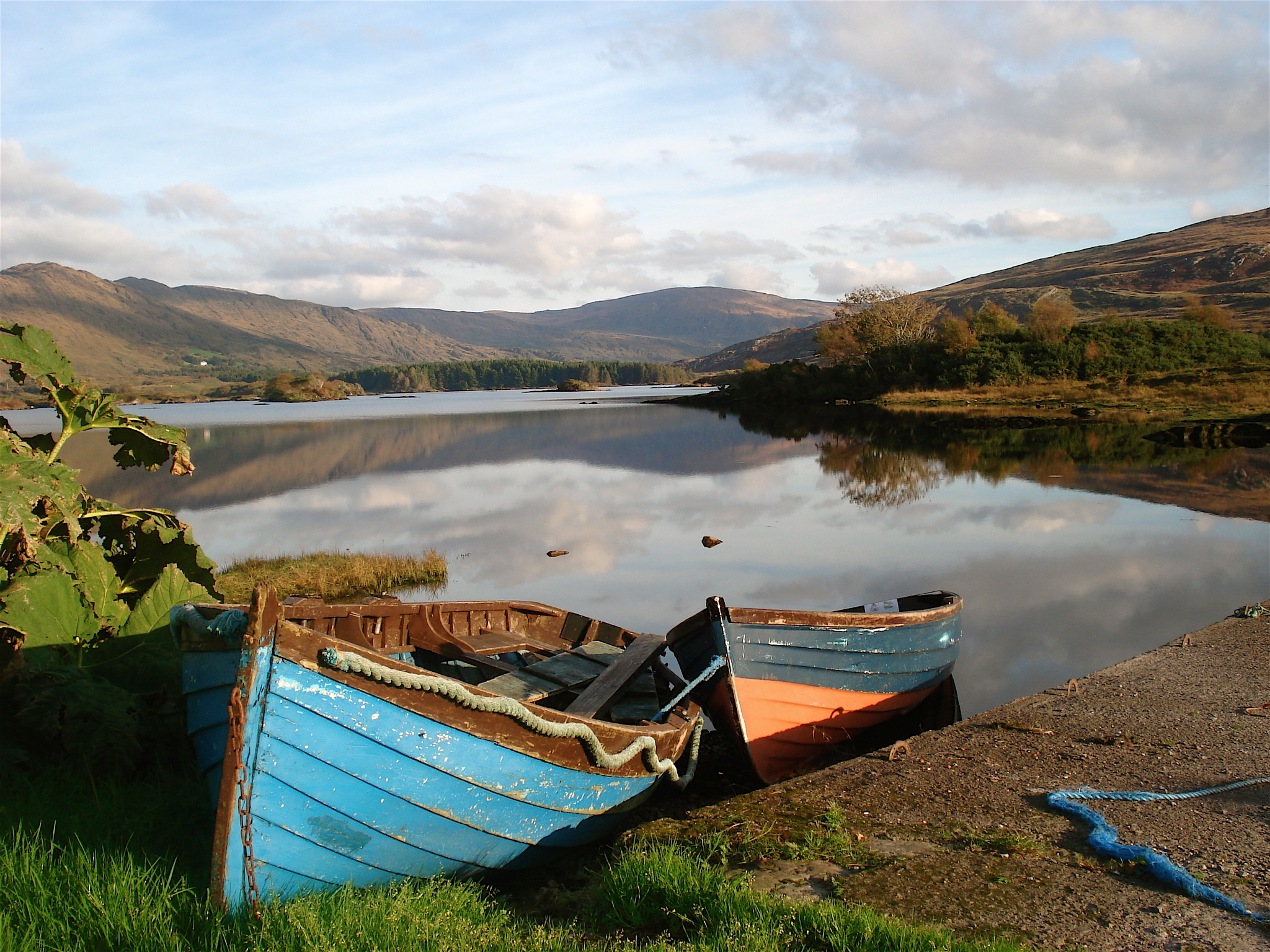
- Upper Cloonee Lough

- Location in Ireland
- Location: County Kerry
- Coordinates: 51.8183°N 9.7221°W
- Catchment area: 27.02 km^{2} (10.4 sq mi)
- Basin countries: Ireland
- Surface area: 0.71 km^{2} (0.27 sq mi) (middle Cloonee Lough)
- Surface elevation: 26 m (85 ft) (middle Cloonee Lough)

Cloonee Lough, or the Cloonee Loughs (Irish: Locha Chluain Í), is a system of three freshwater lakes in County Kerry, Ireland, consisting of upper Cloonee Lough, middle Cloonee Lough and lower Cloonee Lough.

== Geography and hydrology ==
The Cloonee Loughs are about 8 kilometres (5 mi) south of Kenmare on the Beara Peninsula. The lakes are oligotrophic. Upper Cloonee Lough is fed by the Ameen River from Inchiquin Lough. Lower Cloonee Lough is connected to the middle and upper lakes by the Beal-na-Shannin River and drains into the Kenmare River estuary via the Cloonee River.

== Natural history ==
Fish species in the Cloonee Loughs include Arctic char, brown trout, sea trout and sometimes young Atlantic salmon (grilse). The Cloonee Loughs are part of the Cloonee and Inchiquin Loughs, Uragh Wood Special Area of Conservation.

== See also ==
- List of loughs in Ireland
