= Lough Anaserd =

Lake in County Galway, Ireland

- Loch an Easaird (Irish)
- Location in Ireland
- Location: County Galway
- Coordinates: 53°25′43″N 10°5′48″W
- Catchment area: 2.08 km^{2} (0.8 sq mi)
- Basin countries: Ireland
- Max. length: 1.2 km (1 mi)
- Max. width: 1.0 km (0.6 mi)
- Surface area: 0.87 km^{2} (0.34 sq mi)
- Surface elevation: 8 m (26 ft)

Lough Anaserd (Irish: Loch an Easaird) is a freshwater lake in the west of Ireland. It is located in west County Galway on the Slyne Head peninsula.

== Geography and hydrology ==
Lough Anaserd is about 12 kilometres (7 mi) south of Clifden, near Ballyconneely. The lake has numerous rocky islands and is oligotrophic.

== Natural history ==
Lough Anaserd is home to the slender naiad (Najas flexilis), a rare plant species. The lake is part of the Slyne Head Peninsula Special Area of Conservation.

== See also ==
- List of loughs in Ireland
- List of Special Areas of Conservation in the Republic of Ireland
