= Lickeen Lough =

Lake in County Clare, Ireland

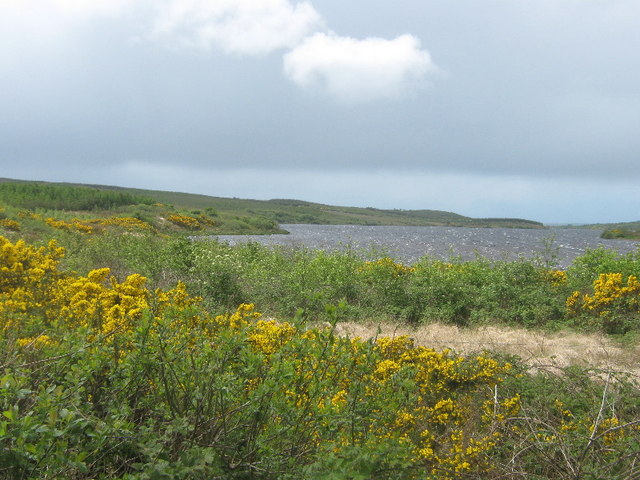

- Location in Ireland
- Location: County Clare
- Coordinates: 52°57′50″N 9°13′23″W
- Catchment area: 9.03 km^{2} (3.5 sq mi)
- Basin countries: Ireland
- Max. length: 2.5 km (1.6 mi)
- Max. width: 0.5 km (0.3 mi)
- Surface area: 0.84 km^{2} (0.32 sq mi)
- Average depth: 4 m (13 ft)
- Max. depth: 20 m (66 ft)
- Surface elevation: 70 m (230 ft)

Lickeen Lough is a freshwater lake in the Mid-West Region of Ireland. It is located in The Burren of County Clare.

== Geography ==
Lickeen Lough measures about 2.5 km (1.6 mi) long and 0.5 km (0.3 mi) wide. It lies about 3 km (2 mi) northeast of Ennistymon.

== Natural history ==
Fish species in Lickeen Lough include rudd, brown trout, three-spined stickleback and the critically endangered European eel. Arctic char formerly present in the lake are now extinct.

== See also ==
- List of loughs in Ireland
