= Loughareema =

Ephemeral lake in Ballyvennaght, County Antrim, Northern Ireland

- The Vanishing Lake
- Loch an Mhadhma (Irish)
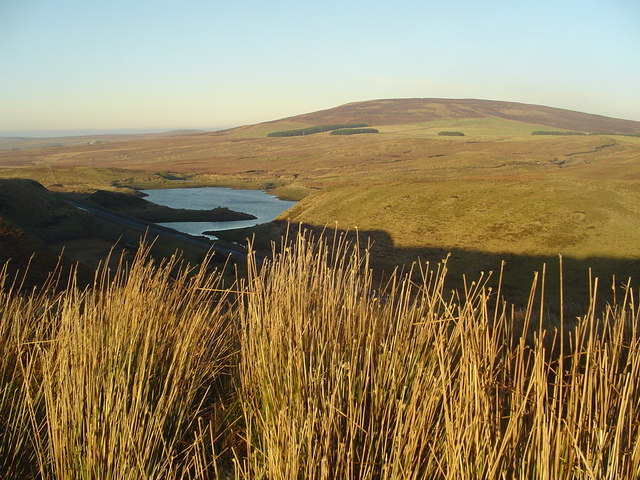

- Location within Northern Ireland
- Interactive map of Loughareema
- Location: Ballyvennaght, County Antrim, Northern Ireland
- Coordinates: 55°09′25″N 6°06′29″W
- Type: Ephemeral lake
- Primary inflows: unnamed streams
- Primary outflows: subterranean drainage
- Max. length: Maximum: 300 m (980 ft)
- Max. width: Maximum: 150 m (490 ft)
- Surface area: Maximum: 2–3 km^{2} (0.8–1.2 sq mi)
- Surface elevation: 217–218 m (712–715 ft)

Loughareema, also known as The Vanishing Lake and Loughaveema, (Irish: Loch an Mhadhma) is an ephemeral lake in the townland of Ballyvennaght in the civil parish of Culfeightrin, County Antrim, Northern Ireland. The lake is known for its rapid draining and filling.

== Etymology ==
The name Loughareema is an anglicisation of the Irish "Loc an Rith Amach", meaning "the lake that runs out". An alternative spelling, Loughaveema, is also used, as Loughareema is hard to pronounce in English.

The nickname "The Vanishing Lake" derives from the lake's rapid draining and filling.
