= Killarga =

Village in County Leitrim, Ireland

Coordinates: 54.22967°N 8.21074°W

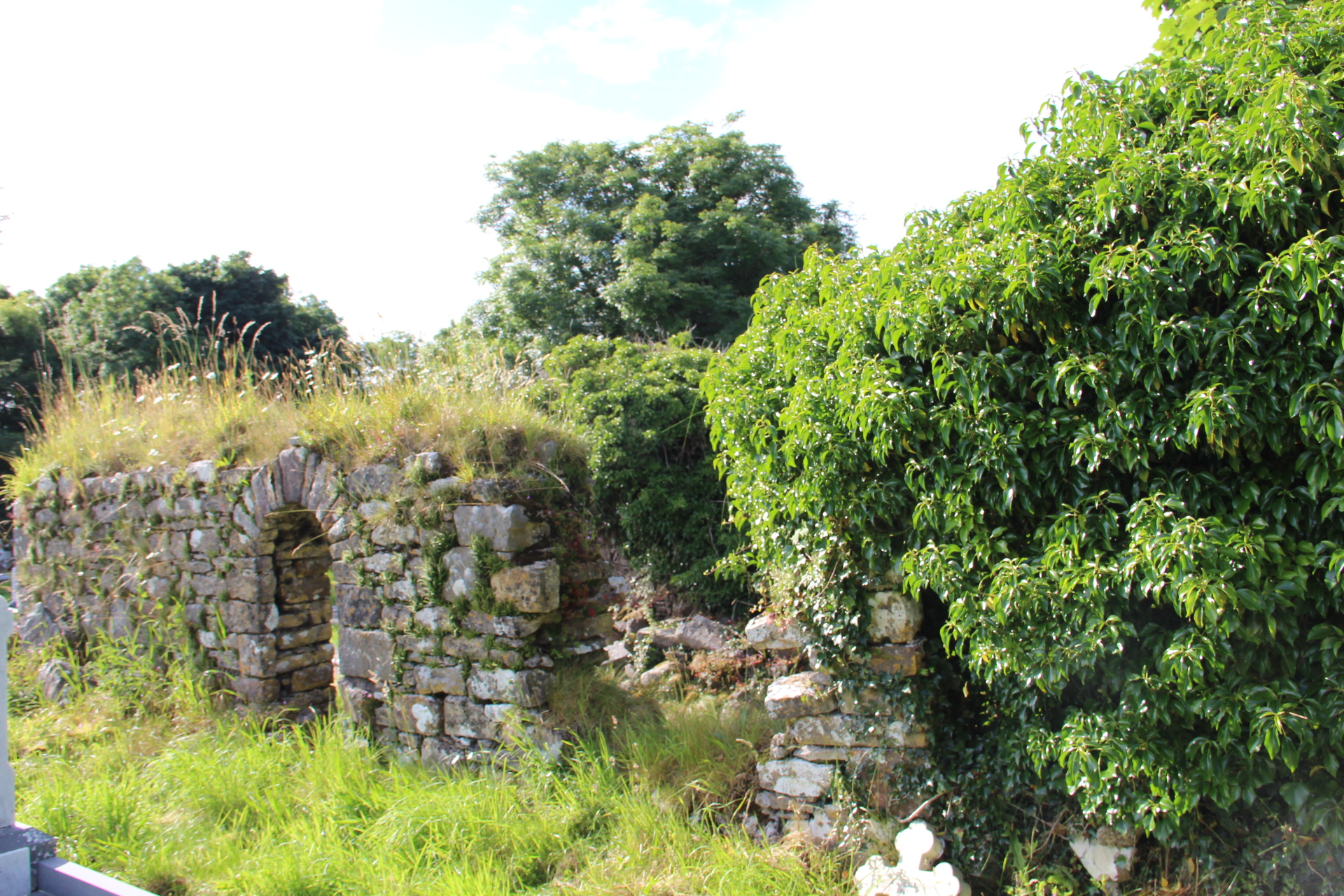
6th c. church of St Fearga

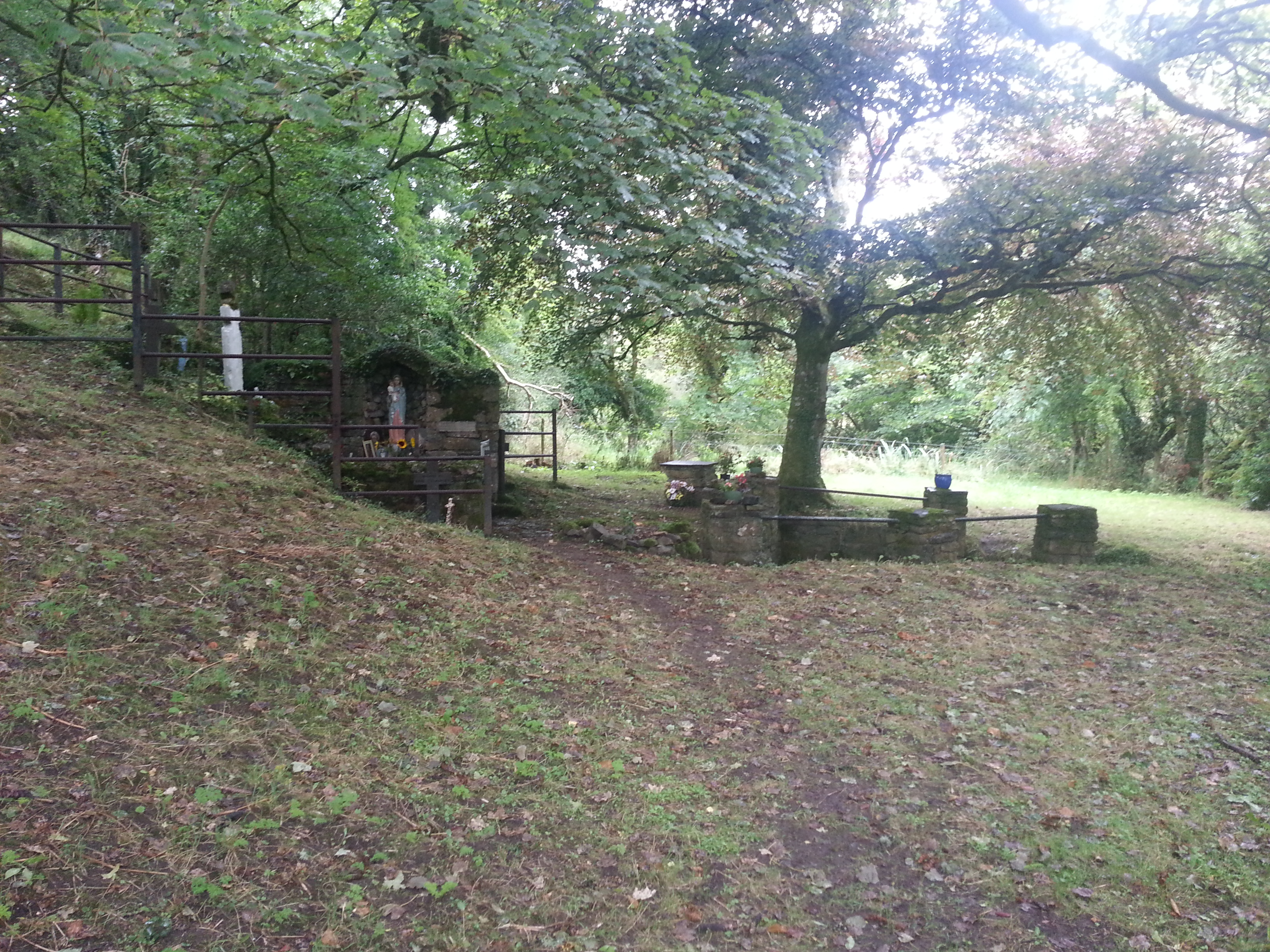
Tobar Mhuire

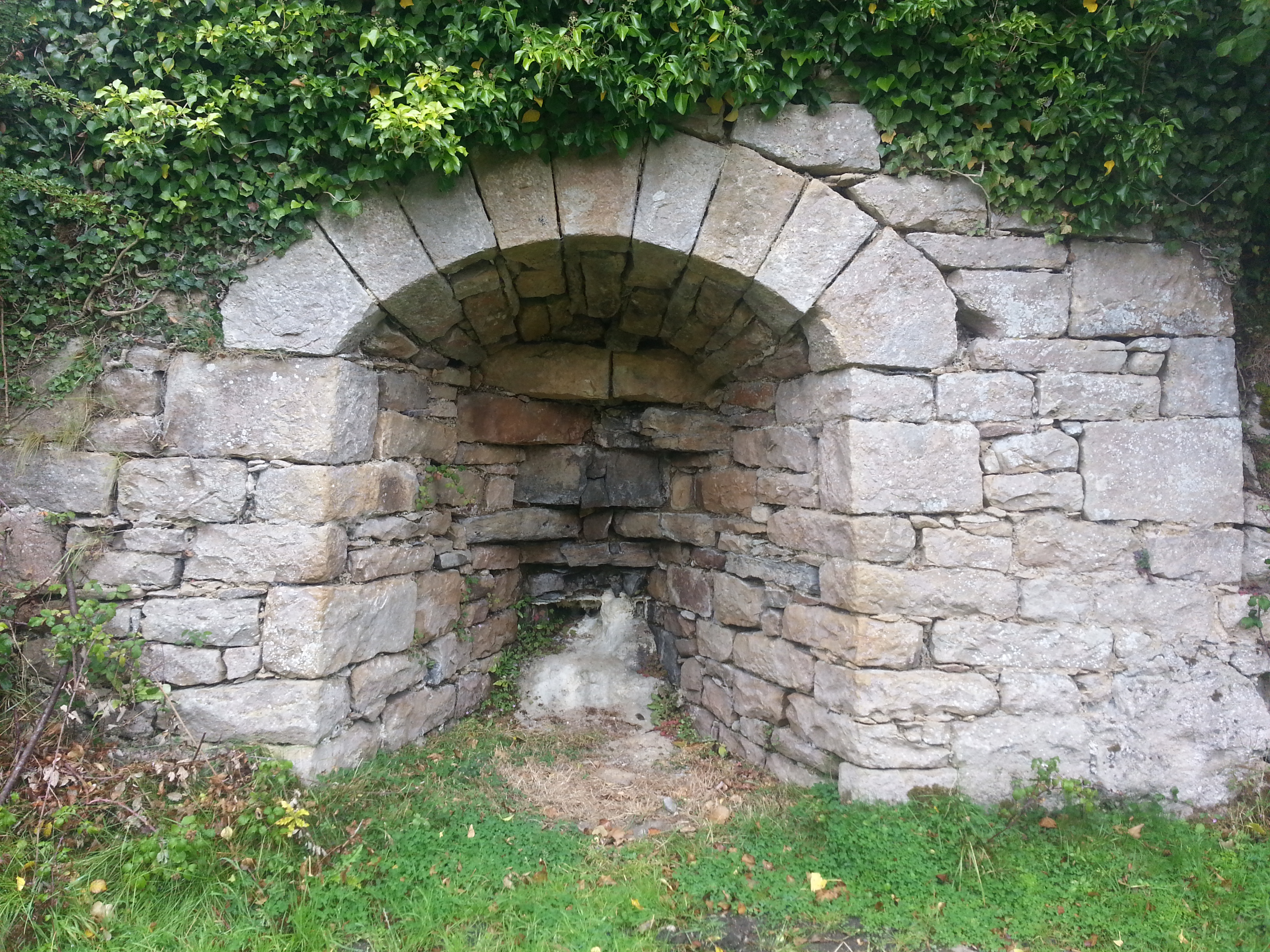
Tiníl/Limekiln

Killarga or Killargue (Irish: Cill Fhearga) is a small village in County Leitrim, Ireland. Killarga is in a townland and civil parish of the same name.

Killarga is an ancient place of pilgrimage and was attached to a religious settlement, Cill Fhearga, which according to the Annals of the Four Masters was founded by a holy woman, St Fearga, as early as the 6th century. There is a holy well named Tobar Mhuire, a 19th-century lime kiln on the way into it, a Teach Allais (ancient Irish sweat house) and other historical ruins in the area. Nearby is O'Donnell's Rock which is named after Aodh Rua Ó Dónaill.

The village has a school (Saint Brigid's National School), a post office, a community hall, a shop and a pub.

== See also ==
- List of towns and villages in Ireland
