= Islandeady Lough =

Lake in County Mayo, Ireland

- Loch Oileán Éadaí (Irish)
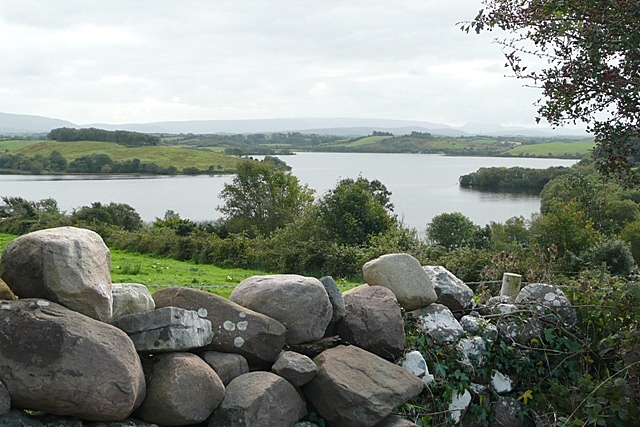

- Location in Ireland
- Location: County Mayo
- Coordinates: 53°49′49″N 9°23′3″W
- Primary outflows: Castlebar River
- Catchment area: 55.94 km^{2} (21.6 sq mi)
- Basin countries: Ireland
- Max. length: 1.7 km (1.1 mi)
- Max. width: 1.1 km (0.7 mi)
- Surface area: 1.39 km^{2} (0.54 sq mi)
- Surface elevation: 27 m (89 ft)

Islandeady Lough (Irish: Loch Oileán Éadaí) is a freshwater lake in the west of Ireland. It is located in County Mayo.

== Geography ==
Islandeady Lough measures about 2 km (1.2 mi) long and 1 km (0.6 mi) wide. It is located about 10 km (6 mi) west of Castlebar.

== Hydrology and natural history ==
Islandeady Lough drains to neighbouring Castlebar Lough via the Castlebar River. The river in turn flows through Lough Lannagh before passing through Castlebar. Islandeady Lough is stocked annually with brown trout.

== Gallery ==
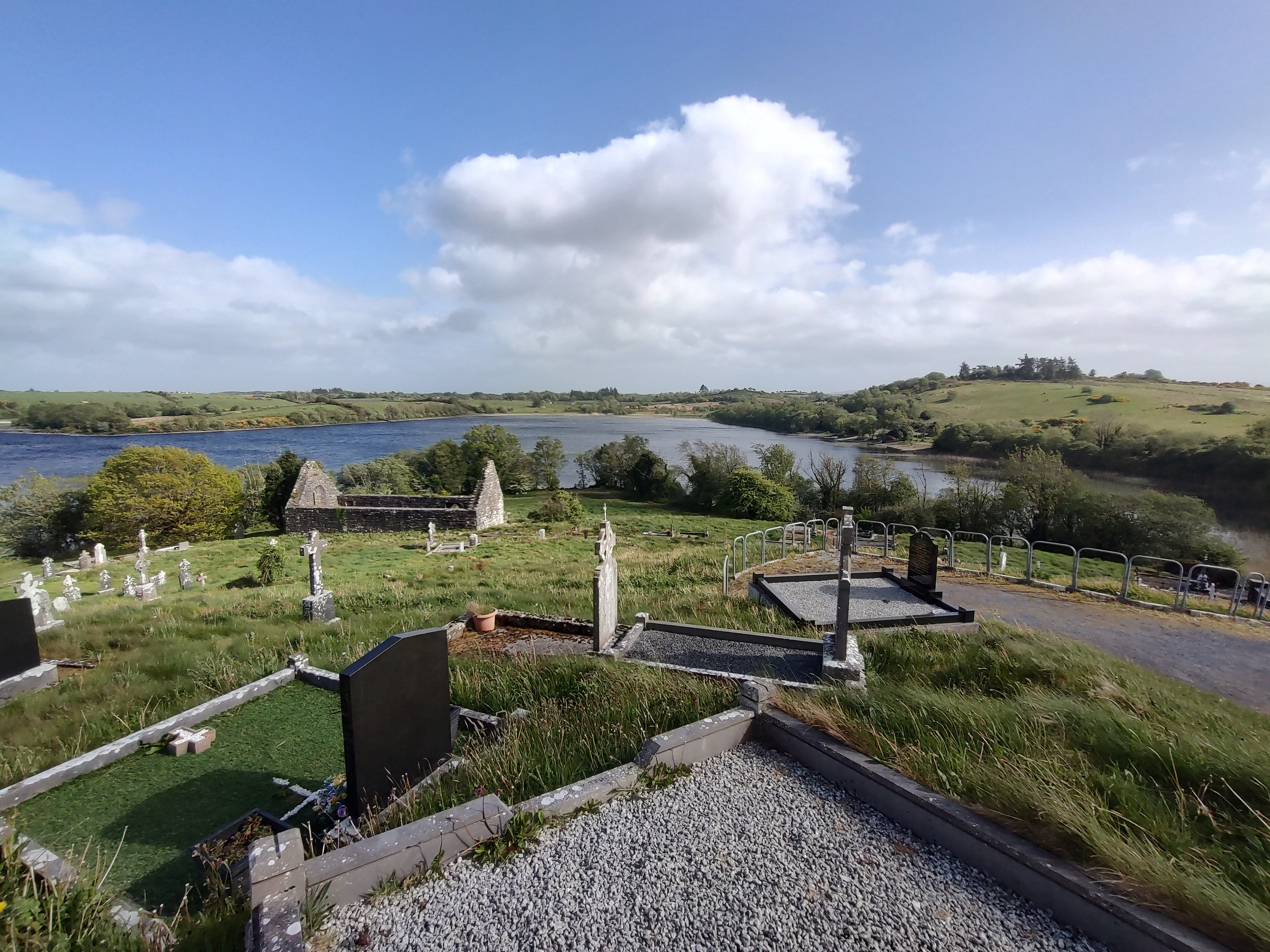
View east from Islandeady graveyard

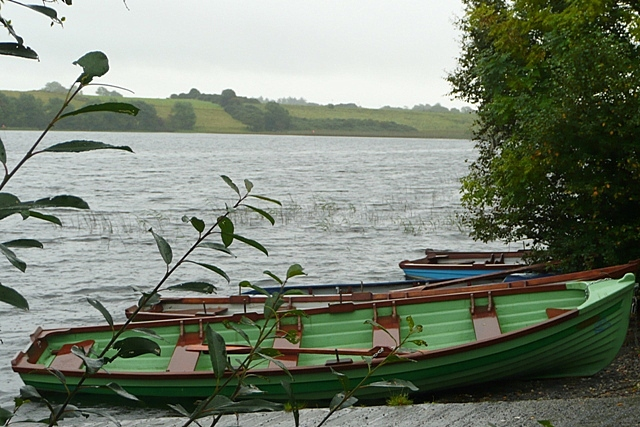
Rowing boats for hire

== See also ==
- List of loughs in Ireland
