= Muckanagh Lough =

Lake in County Clare, Ireland

- Location in Ireland
- Location: County Clare, Ireland
- Coordinates: 52°58′59″N 8°56′15″W
- Catchment area: 22.15 km^{2} (8.6 sq mi)
- Basin countries: Ireland
- Max. length: 1.4 km (0.9 mi)
- Max. width: 0.9 km (0.6 mi)
- Surface area: 0.96 km^{2} (0.37 sq mi)
- Average depth: 3 m (10 ft)
- Max. depth: 19 m (62 ft)
- Surface elevation: 17 m (56 ft)
- Islands: Ilaunmore

Muckanagh Lough is a freshwater lake in the Burren region of County Clare, Ireland.

== Geography ==
Muckanagh Lough measures about 1.5 km (0.9 mi) long and 1 km (0.6 mi) wide. It lies about 10 km (6 mi) east of Corofin.

== Natural history ==
Fish species in Muckanagh Lough include brown trout, perch, rudd, pike, tench, three-spined stickleback and the critically endangered European eel. The lake is part of the East Burren Complex Special Area of Conservation.

== See also ==
- List of loughs in Ireland
