= Urlaur Lough =

Lake in County Mayo, Ireland

- Loch Urláir (Irish)
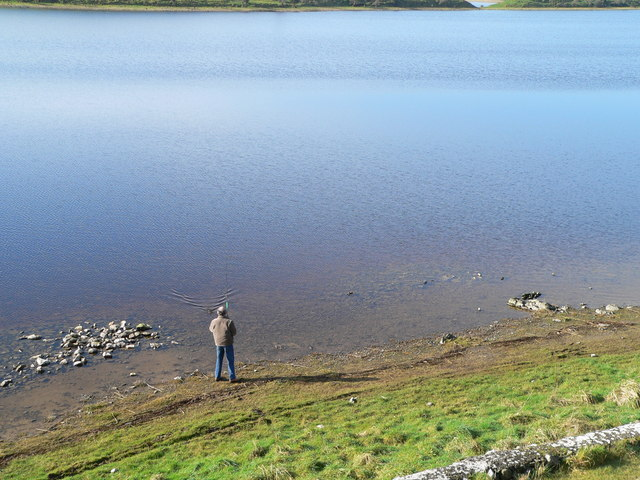
- The lake in 2006

- Location in Ireland
- Location: County Mayo
- Coordinates: 53°50′46″N 8°44′31″W
- Primary outflows: River Lung
- Catchment area: 13.6 km^{2} (5.3 sq mi)
- Basin countries: Ireland
- Max. length: 2.8 km (1.7 mi)
- Max. width: 0.5 km (0.3 mi)
- Surface area: 1.15 km^{2} (0.44 sq mi)
- Average depth: 4 m (13 ft)
- Max. depth: 11 m (36 ft)
- Surface elevation: 81 m (266 ft)

Urlaur Lough is a freshwater lake in the west of Ireland. It is located in east County Mayo and is one of the Urlaur Lakes.

== Geography ==
Urlaur Lough measures about 3 km (1.9 mi) long and 0.5 km (0.3 mi) wide. It lies about 10 km (6 mi) north of Ballyhaunis near Lough Nanaoge and Lough Roe, the other Urlaur Lakes.

== Hydrology ==
Urlaur Lough is the source of the Lung River. The river flows to Lough Gara.

== Natural history ==
Fish species in Urlaur Lough include perch, roach, pike, ninespine stickleback and the critically endangered European eel. Bird species at the lake include tufted duck, pochard, teal, mallard, whooper swan, wigeon and curlew. Urlaur Lough is part of the Urlaur Lakes Special Area of Conservation.

== See also ==
- List of loughs in Ireland
