= Doo Lough, County Clare =

Lake in Clare, Ireland

Doo Lough
- Loch Dúlocha (Irish)
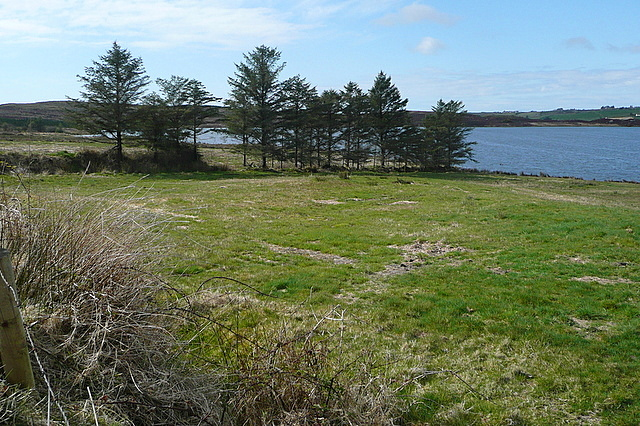

- Location in Ireland
- Location: County Clare
- Coordinates: 52°47′33″N 9°18′12″W
- Catchment area: 23.11 km^{2} (8.9 sq mi)
- Basin countries: Ireland
- Max. length: 3.1 km (1.9 mi)
- Max. width: 0.7 km (0.4 mi)
- Surface area: 1.3 km^{2} (0.50 sq mi)
- Surface elevation: 83 m (272 ft)

Doo Lough (Irish: Loch Dúlocha) is a freshwater lake in the Mid-West Region of Ireland. It is located in County Clare. In the townland of Knocknaboley.

== Geography ==
Doo Lough measures about 3 km (1.9 mi) long and 0.7 km (0.4 mi) wide. It lies about 15 km (9 mi) southeast of Milltown Malbay.

== Natural history ==
Doo Lough is a brown trout fishing destination. The lake is located just north of the Cragnashingaun Bogs Natural Heritage Area.

== Viking History ==
The Danish Vikings raided County Clare on many occasions during the 9th and 10th centuries. The integrated bloodlines were known as Norse–Gaels. In beginning of the 11th century, the vikings were defeated in Ireland by Brian Boru.

One of the locations of the settlers of the Viking Norse–Gaels was Doo Lough. Many of the local families holding Viking Norse–Gael surnames, such as McMahon, which means ’bear’ in Irish.

== See also ==
- List of loughs in Ireland
