= Lough Bofin, County Galway =

Lake in County Galway, Ireland

Lough Bofin
- Loch Bó Finne (Irish)
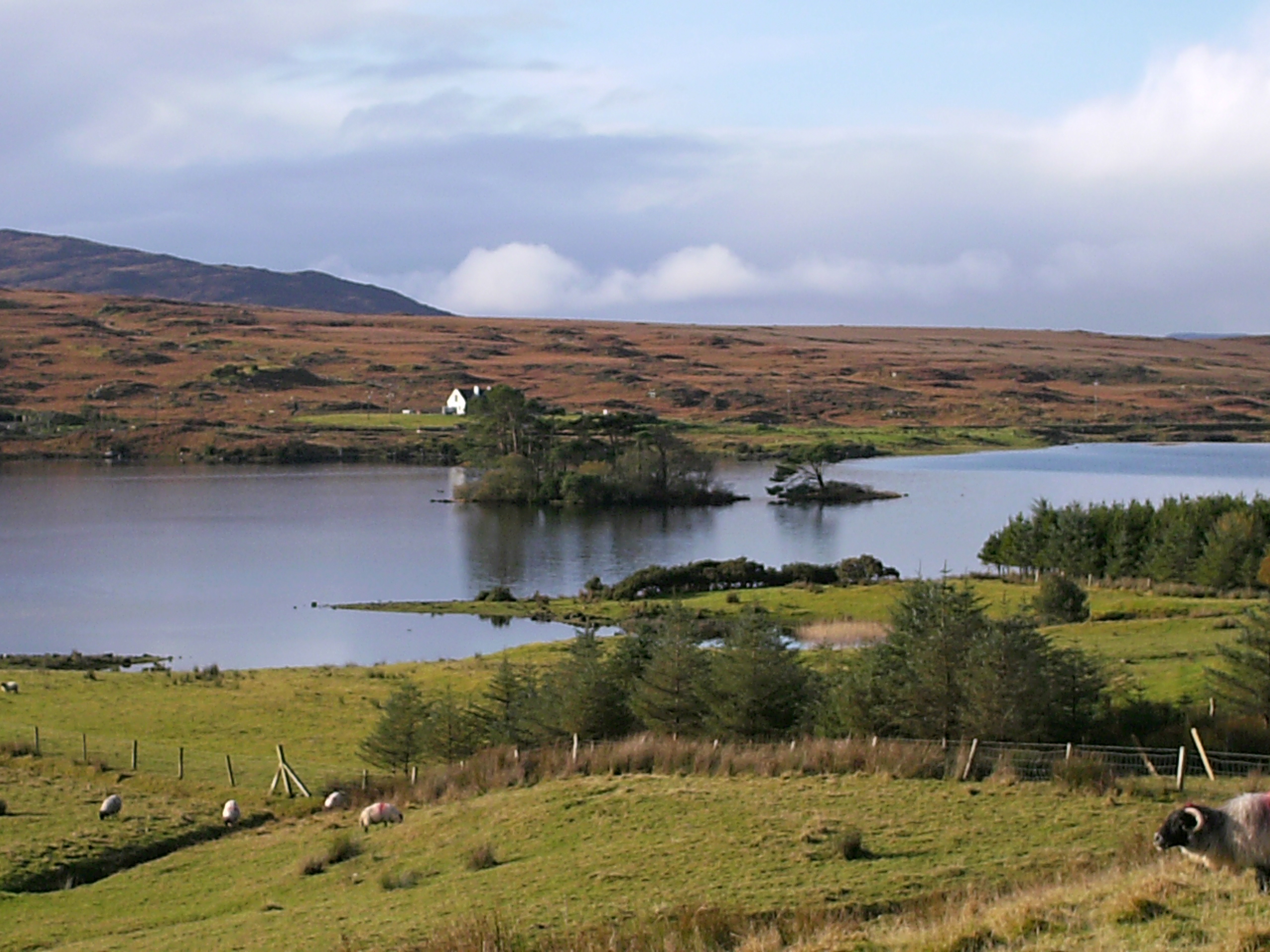

- Location in Ireland
- Location: County Galway
- Coordinates: 53°26′5″N 9°26′43″W
- Catchment area: 21.9 km^{2} (8.5 sq mi)
- Basin countries: Ireland
- Max. length: 2.5 km (1.6 mi)
- Max. width: 0.5 km (0.3 mi)
- Surface area: 0.92 km^{2} (0.36 sq mi)
- Surface elevation: 40 m (130 ft)

Lough Bofin (Irish: Loch Bó Finne) is a freshwater lake in the west of Ireland. It is located in the Connemara area of County Galway.

== Geography and natural history ==
Lough Bofin is located along the N59 road about 10 km (6 mi) west of Oughterard. The lake is part of the Connemara Bog Complex Special Area of Conservation.

== See also ==
- List of loughs in Ireland
