= Lough Gullion =

Lake in County Armagh, Northern Ireland

- Loch gCuillinn (Irish)
- Location within Northern Ireland
- Location: County Armagh, Northern Ireland
- Coordinates: 54.489628°N 6.445857°W
- Primary outflows: Upper Bann
- Basin countries: Northern Ireland
- Surface area: 1.3 km^{2} (0.50 sq mi)
- Surface elevation: 59 m (194 ft)

Lough Gullion is a shallow lake north of Craigavon, County Armagh in Northern Ireland.

== Wildlife ==
The lough is vegetated with bur-reed and water plantain. Regular birds visiting the lough include tufted duck, mute swan, pochard and northern shoveler. Fish include bream, roach, perch, eel and northern pike.

== See also ==
- List of loughs in Ireland
