= Ballysaggart Lough =

Lake in Northern Ireland

Ballysaggart Lough Black Lough Loch Bhaile an tSagairt Loch Dhubh
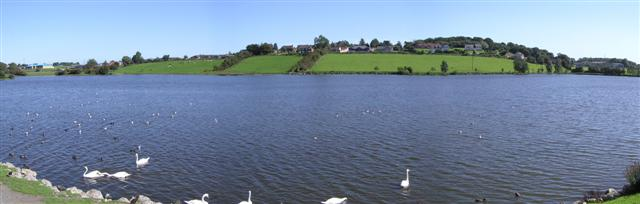

- Location in Northern Ireland
- Location: Dungannon, County Tyrone, Northern Ireland
- Coordinates: 54°29′40″N 6°46′40″W
- Basin countries: United Kingdom

Ballysaggart Lough or Black Lough is a lough in Dungannon, County Tyrone, Northern Ireland. It is within the drainage basin of the River Blackwater which flows out of Lough Neagh. It is part of the waterway created to service mills in nearby Moygashel. The lough has an area of 42.5 acres (17.2 ha). Bally Saggart Lough came under the ownership of Mid Ulster District Council in 2014 and the Council are looking to improve public access to the Lough.

In 2002 a man drowned after getting into difficulties swimming across it.

The Ballysaggart Environmental Group was formed in 2004 to protect the unique habitat in and around the Lough. 102 species of bird have been recorded at the Lough, 18 of which are "on the endangered list". Species recorded include Eurasian curlew, Eurasian teal and hen harrier, mallard, Eurasian wigeon, common goldeneye and whooper swan. In 2006 a vagrant drake lesser scaup was photographed on the lough, while other unusual bird species reported from lough include Iceland gull, glaucous gull and yellow-legged gull. Among the fish species recorded in the lough are pike, perch and rudd, roach, bream, tench and eel. Coarse fishing takes place at the lough with the best fishing are near the sluice at its northern end where the water is deeper.

The name Ballysaggart is considered to mean the "field or townland of the priests" and a priory was located towards the northern end of Ballysaggart Lough. This may refer to a Franciscan Priory on Drumbearn Hill at Castlecaulfield which opened in 1687, before moving to Donnaghmore and lasted until 1816-17 when the last friar died.

== See also ==
- List of loughs in Ireland
