= Lough Beltra =

Lake in County Mayo, Ireland

- Loch Bhéal Trá (Irish)
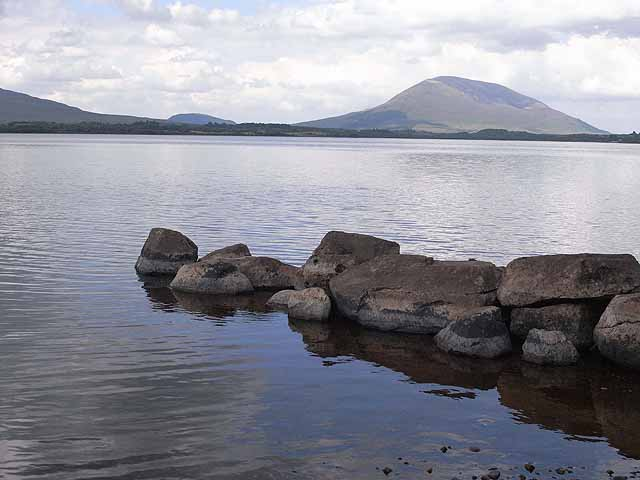
- Lough Beltra, with Nephin in the background

- Location within Ireland
- Location: County Mayo, Ireland
- Coordinates: 53.924932°N 9.413208°W
- Primary inflows: Crumpaun River
- Primary outflows: Newport River
- Basin countries: Ireland
- Surface area: 4.1 km^{2} (1.6 sq mi)
- Surface elevation: 21 m (69 ft)
- Islands: Coarse Island, Islandmore, Bush Island

Lough Beltra or Beltra Lough is a lake in County Mayo, Ireland.

It is located in a mountainous region, west of Croaghmoyle and northeast of Newport. The name in Irish is Loch Bhéal Trá, "lake of the beach mouth".

== Wildlife ==
Lough Beltra is a noted fishery for salmon and sea trout.

== See also ==
- List of loughs in Ireland
