= Cross Lough =

Lake in County Mayo, Ireland

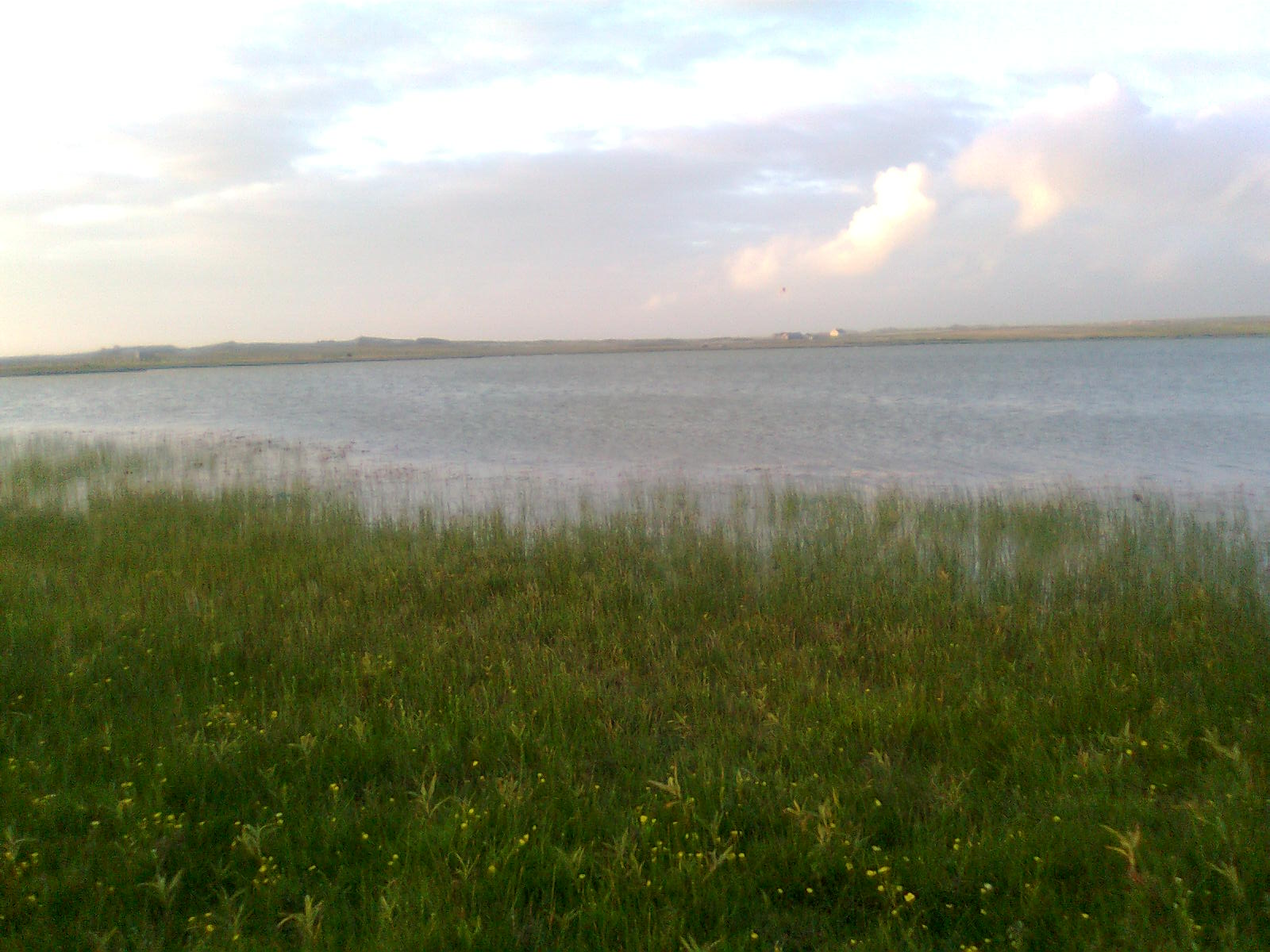

- Location in Ireland
- Location: County Mayo
- Coordinates: 54°11′50″N 10°4′42″W
- Catchment area: 3.37 km^{2} (1.3 sq mi)
- Basin countries: Ireland
- Max. length: 1.7 km (1.1 mi)
- Max. width: 1.2 km (0.7 mi)
- Surface area: 1.11 km^{2} (0.43 sq mi)
- Surface elevation: 3 m (9.8 ft)

Cross Lough is a freshwater lake in the west of Ireland. It is located in northwest County Mayo on the Mullet Peninsula.

== Geography ==
Cross Lough measures about 2 km (1.2 mi) long and 1 km (0.6 mi) wide. It lies about 10 km (6 mi) southwest of Belmullet.

== See also ==
- List of loughs in Ireland
