= Gaeltacht Iorrais agus Acaill =

Group of Irish-speaking areas in County Mayo, Ireland

There are three Irish-speaking areas in County Mayo; Erris, Achill island and Toormakeady. Erris is located in North-West Mayo, Achill island is directly south of Erris and Tourmakeady is along the border with County Galway. There are nearly 2,500 daily Irish speakers in these areas.

== Iorras ==
There are over 1,500 daily Irish speakers in Erris.

List of EDs in the Erris area:

1. Cnoc an Daimh (375) (67%)
2. An Geata Mór Theas (894) (43%)
3. Moing na Bó (304) (22%)
4. An Geata Mór Thuaidh (851) (19%)
5. Béal Deirg Mór (197) (17%)
6. Cnoc na Lobhar (816) (17%)
7. Barr Rúscaí (129) (15%)
8. Na Monga (249) (14%)
9. Gleann Chaisil (476) (14%)
10. Béal an Mhuirthead (1,808) (13%)
11. Cnoc na Ráithe (782) (13%)
12. Guala Mhór (119) (8%)
13. Gleann na Muaidhe (241) (7%)

== Acaill ==
Of the 2,500 people living in the Achill parish area 550 are daily Irish speakers.

List of EDs in the Achill island parish area:

1. An Corran (730) (25%)
2. Acaill (934) (24%)
3. Dumha Eige (654) (20%)

== Tuar Mhic Éadaigh ==
The Tourmakeady area is an Irish-speaking area in the south of County Mayo along the border with County Galway. It is an extension of the Galway Gaeltacht. There are 1,000 people living in the area and approx. 400 are daily Irish speakers.

List of EDs in the Tourmakeady area:

1. Abhainn Bhrain (242) (54%)
2. Baile an Chalaidh (229) (41%)
3. Partraí (38) (31%)
4. An Cheapaigh Dhuibh (328) (29%)
5. Baile Óbha (166) (28%)
6. Tamhnaigh na Graí (50) (10%)

== See also ==
County Galway

- Galway City Gaeltacht
- Gaeltacht Cois Fharraige
- Conamara Theas
- Aran Islands
- Joyce Country

County Donegal

- Gaoith Dhobhair
- Na Rosa
- Cloch Cheann Fhaola
- Gaeltacht an Láir

County Kerry

- Gaeltacht Corca Dhuibhne
