= Gaeltacht an Láir =

Irish-speaking area of County Donegal

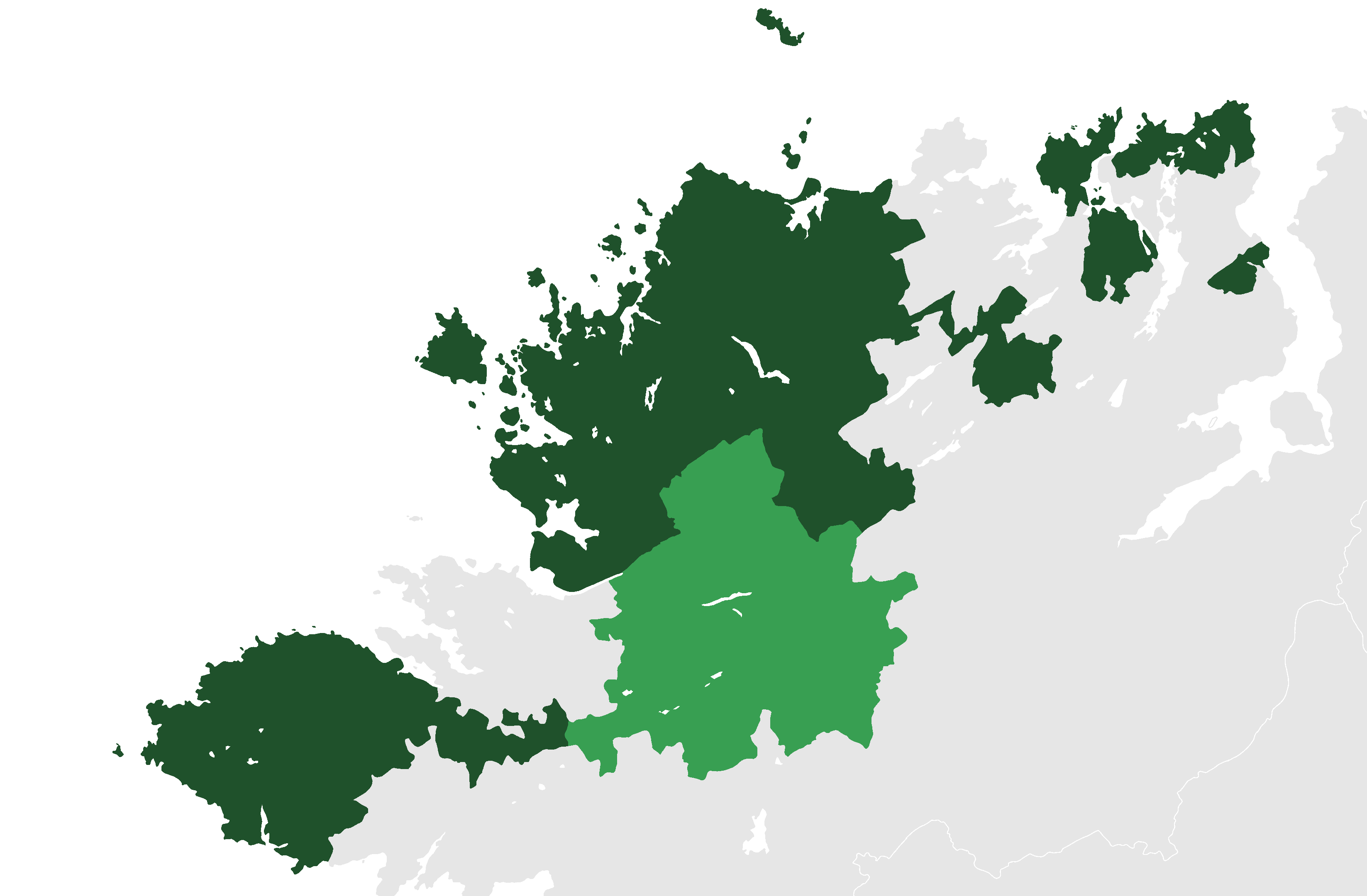
Gaeltacht an Láir (light green) within the greater Gaeltacht of County Donegal (dark green)

Gaeltacht an Láir is an Irish-speaking area in the central part of County Donegal in the west of Ulster, the northern province in Ireland. It centres on the village of Baile na Finne (Fintown) and stretches south to Gleann Colm Cille and north to Fanad and Rosguill. There are nearly 7,000 people living in the area and 2,000 daily Irish speakers.

== Baile na Finne ==
There are over 1,200 people living in the area and 500 Irish speakers.

The following is a list of EDs (Electoral Divisions) around Baile na Finne (Fintown):

1. Baile na Finne (296) (59%)
2. Min an Laban (51) (3%)
3. Sui Corr (14) (71%)
4. Mhin Carraigeach (11) (9%)
5. An Clochan (488) (38%)
6. An Ghrafaidh (192) (56%)
7. Gleann Leithin (167) (57%)

== Gleann Colmcille ==
There are over 3,000 people living in the area and 850 Irish speakers.

The following is a list of EDs around the Gleann Colmcille area:

1. Gleann Colmcille (689) (37%)
2. Malainn Bhig (377) (26%)
3. Cill Ghabhlaigh (374) (36%)
4. Cro Chaorach (134) (19%)
5. Cill Cartaigh (627) (22%)
6. An Leargaidh Mhor (378) (27%)
7. Inis Caoil (112) (18%)
8. Gleann Gheis (154) (16%)
9. Maol Mosog (137) (13%)
10. Ard an Ratha (52) (13%)
11. Na Gleannta (115) (13%)

== Fanad / Rosguill ==
There are over 2,500 people living in the area and 650 Irish speakers.

The village of Carrigart (Irish: Carraig Airt) is at the centre of this northernmost Gaeltacht in Ireland. It mainly covers the Fanad and Rosguill area.

The following is a list of EDs in the area around Carrig AIrt:

1. Carraig Airt (382) (17%)
2. Fanad (711) (30%)
3. Rosguill (782) (33%)
4. Creamghort (281) (20%)
5. Grianphort (19) (15%)
6. An Cheathru Chaol (20) (10%)
7. Cnoc Colbha (110) (10%)
8. Loch Caol (34) (20%)
9. An Tearmann (183) (21%)
10. Crioch na Smear (38) (13%)
11. Dun Fionnachaidh (58) (8%)
12. Caislean na dTuath (34) (2%)

== See also ==
County Galway

- Galway City Gaeltacht
- Gaeltacht Cois Fharraige
- Conamara Theas
- Aran Islands
- Joyce Country

County Donegal

- Gaoith Dhobhair
- Na Rosa
- Cloch Cheann Fhaola

County Kerry

- Gaeltacht Corca Dhuibhne

County Mayo

- Gaeltacht Iorrais agus Acaill
