= Conamara Theas =

District in County Galway, Ireland

Conamara Theas (Irish for South Connemara) is a predominantly Irish-speaking district in the West of County Galway. There are around 7,000 people living in the area (excluding the Aran islands). Between 60% and 80% of residents are native Irish speakers. It is the part of the Gaeltacht that is west of Cois Fharraige. The Conamara Theas variety of Connacht Irish is different from that of Cois Fharraige.

Conamara Theas covers the area from Ros a Mhil, Casla, An Cheathrú Rua, Ceantar na nOileán, Camus, Rosmuc and The Iorras Aithneach peninsula.

The ferry port for the Aran Islands is in Ros a Mhil.

Casla is the location of the national Irish language station RTÉ Raidio na Gaeltachta.

An Cheathrú Rua is the biggest village in the area and the location of the Irish language newspaper Foinse. There is also the Department of Spoken Irish at the National University of Ireland, Galway which has a centre in the village offering third-level courses to both students and overseas learners.

The NUIG also has a second educational centre in Carna.

Area	Population	Irish Speakers
Garumna	1,245	92% (1,148)
Leitir Móir	791	88% (703)
An Crompán	2192	88% (1,934)
Camas	375	90% (341)
Cill Chuimín	114	52% (60)
An Turlach	460	85% (394)
Abhainn Ghabhla	334	75% (251)
Scainimh	625	92% (576)
An Cnoc Buí	808	81% (658)
Cloch na Rón	85	21% (18)
TOTAL	7,029	6,083

== See also ==
County Galway

- Galway City Gaeltacht
- Gaeltacht Cois Fharraige
- Aran Islands
- Joyce Country

County Donegal

- Gaoth Dobhair
- Na Rosa
- Cloch Cheann Fhaola
- Gaeltacht an Láir

County Kerry

- Gaeltacht Corca Dhuibhne

County Mayo

- Gaeltacht Iorrais agus Acaill
