= Cloughaneely =

Irish-speaking district, County Donegal, Ireland

Cloch Cheann Fhaola Cloughaneely
- Parish and District
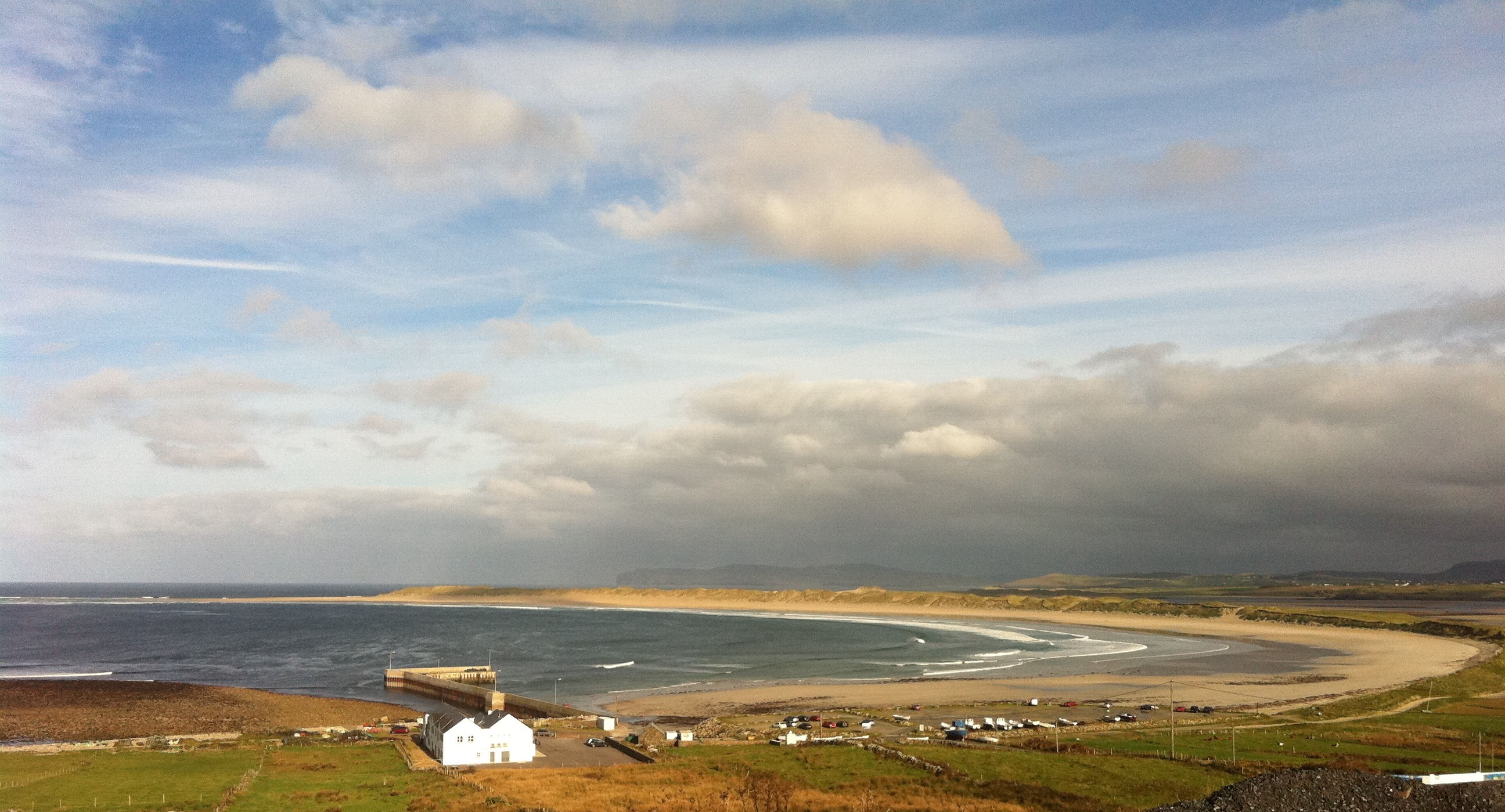
- Machaire Rabhartaigh (Magheroarty) Strand in Cloughaneely

- Location in Ireland
- Coordinates: 55°07′30″N 8°07′30″W
- Country: Ireland
- Province: Ulster
- County: County Donegal
- Barony: Kilmacrenan

Government
  - Dáil Éireann: Donegal
  - EU Parliament: Midlands–North-West

Population (2003)
  - Total: 4,000
- Time zone: UTC+0 (WET)
  - Summer (DST): UTC-1 (IST (WEST))
- Area code: 074 95, +000 353 74 95
- Irish Grid Reference: B847228

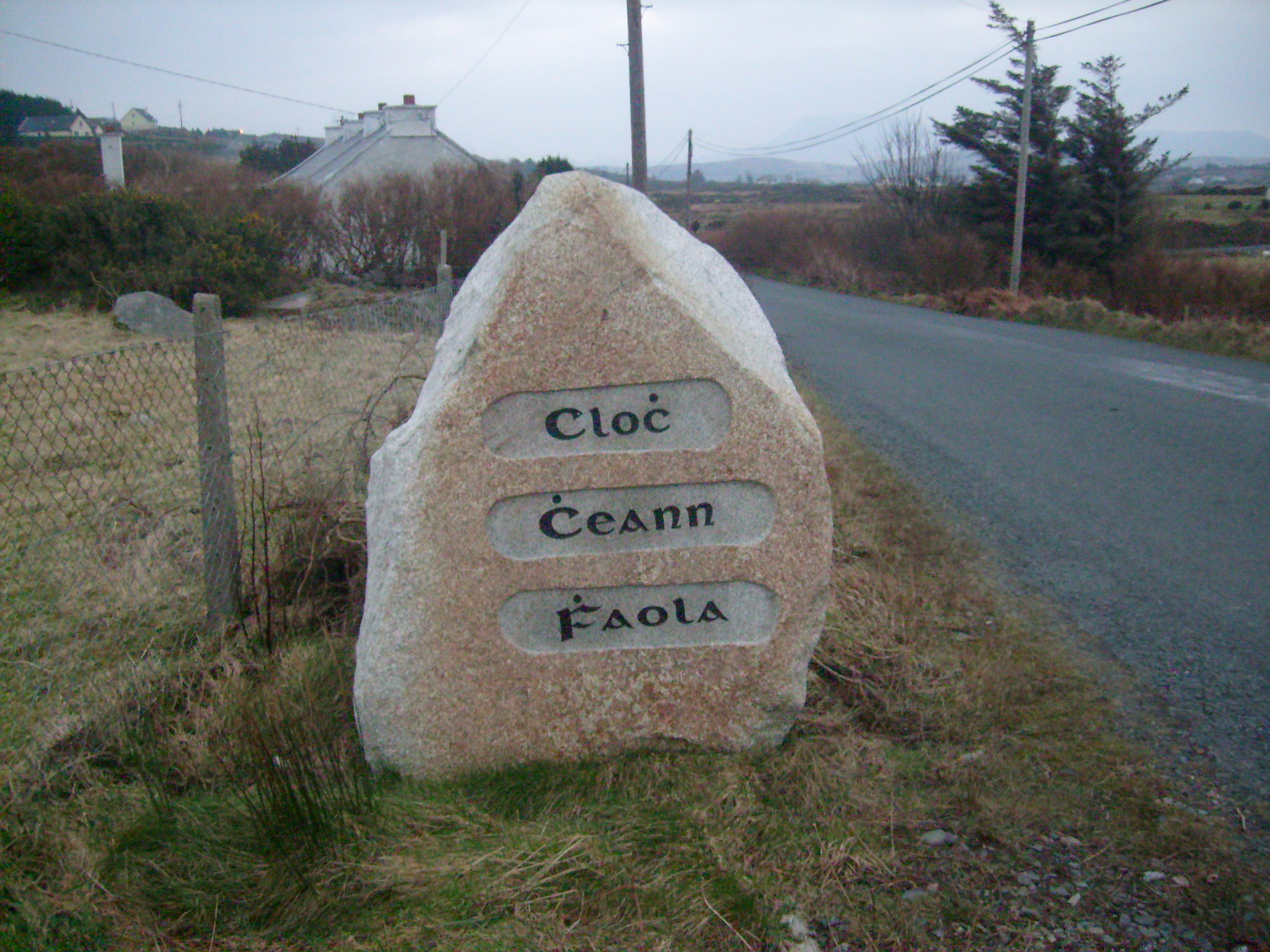
A sign indicating the beginning of Cloughaneely

Cloughaneely (official name: Cloich Cheann Fhaola) is a district in the north-west of County Donegal in Ireland. This is a mainly coastal area with a population of over 4,000 centred on the towns of Falcarragh (An Fál Carrach) and Gortahork (Gort an Choirce). It is a Gaeltacht area, meaning the Irish language is spoken as the primary language. Cloughaneely includes the secondary school Pobalscoil Chloich Cheannfhaola, with just under 500 students. Places of interest include Cnoc na Naomh, considered to be a mountain with religious significance. Cloughaneely, The Rosses (Na Rosa) and Gweedore (Gaoth Dobhair), known locally as "the three parishes" with 16,000 Irish speakers, together form a social and cultural region different from the rest of the county, with Gweedore serving as the main centre for industry.

== Irish language ==
There are 2 EDs Electoral Divisions in the area:

1. Gort a' Choirce (1,599) (81%)
2. Na Croisbhealaí (2,168) (44%)

== Etymology ==
The name Cloich Cheann Fhaola (also written Cloich Chionnaola, meaning "the Stone of Feeley's Head") comes from a story which tells of the killing of McFeeley. The story says that Balor of the Evil Eye beheaded him on a rock because he had stolen the Cow of Plenty that Balor had on the island of Toraigh (Tory Island) from Balor's grasp and brought it back to the mainland. Another version of the story has Balor stealing the cow from MacKineely [sic], who then forcibly impregnates Balor's daughter Ethnea with the help of a Leanan Sidhe. Balor beheads him in revenge. According to this source, "the blood gushed forth and penetrated the stone to its very centre, thus forming the red veins which are still shown to the traveller; for the stone was raised in 1794, on a pillar sixteen feet high, and gives its name, Clogh-an-Neely, to a district comprising two parishes."

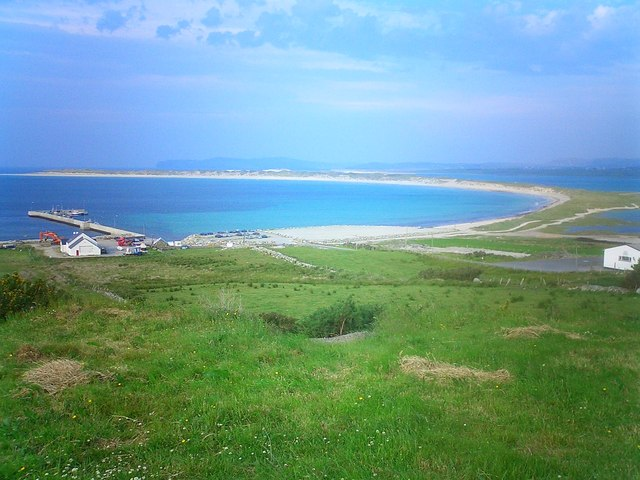
A scenic view of Machaire Rabhartaigh strand and Muckish mountain, Cloughaneely

== Townlands in Cloughaneely ==
- Ballyness (Baile an Easa)
- Ballingat (Baile an Gheata)
- Ballyconnell (Baile Chonaill)
- Ballytemple (Baile an Teampaill)
- Caoldroim Íochtarach (Lower Keeldrum)
- Caoldrum lar (Middle Keeldrum)
- Caoldrum Thuas ( Upper Keeldrum)
- Derryconnor (Doire Chonaire)
- Falcarragh (An Fál Carrach)
- Gortahork (Gort an Choirce)
- Killult (Cill Ulta)
- Magheroarty (Machaire Rabhartaigh)
- Meenlaragh (Mín Lárach)
- An Sruthán Riach

== Islands ==
- Inishbofin (Inis Bó Finne)
- Tory Island (Oileán Thoraigh)

== Notable people ==
- Cathal Ó Searcaigh, poet
- Micí Mac Gabhann, memoirist
- Eithne Coyle, 1916 activist, spy, former president of Cumann na mBan, Mountjoy prison escapee
- Annemarie Ní Churreáin, Poet, Writer

== See also ==
County Galway

- Galway City Gaeltacht
- Gaeltacht Cois Fharraige
- Conamara Theas
- Aran Islands
- Joyce Country

County Donegal

- Gaoth Dhobhair
- Na Rosa
- Gaeltacht an Láir

County Kerry

- Gaeltacht Corca Dhuibhne

County Mayo

- Gaeltacht Iorrais agus Acaill
