= Ross (barony) =

Barony in County Galway, Ireland

Ross An Ros (Irish)
- Barony
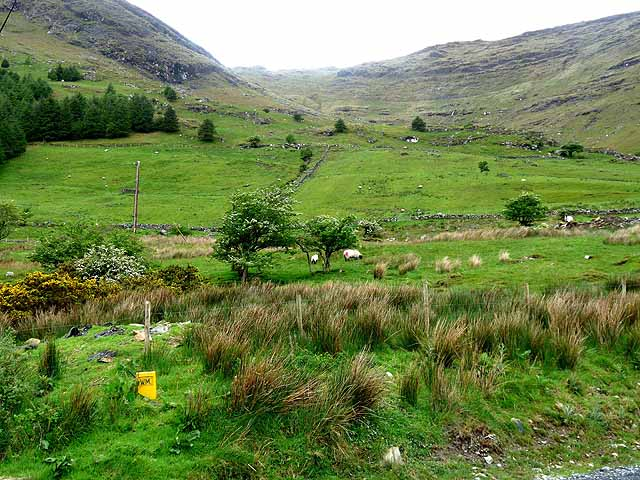
- Slopes of Ben Beg

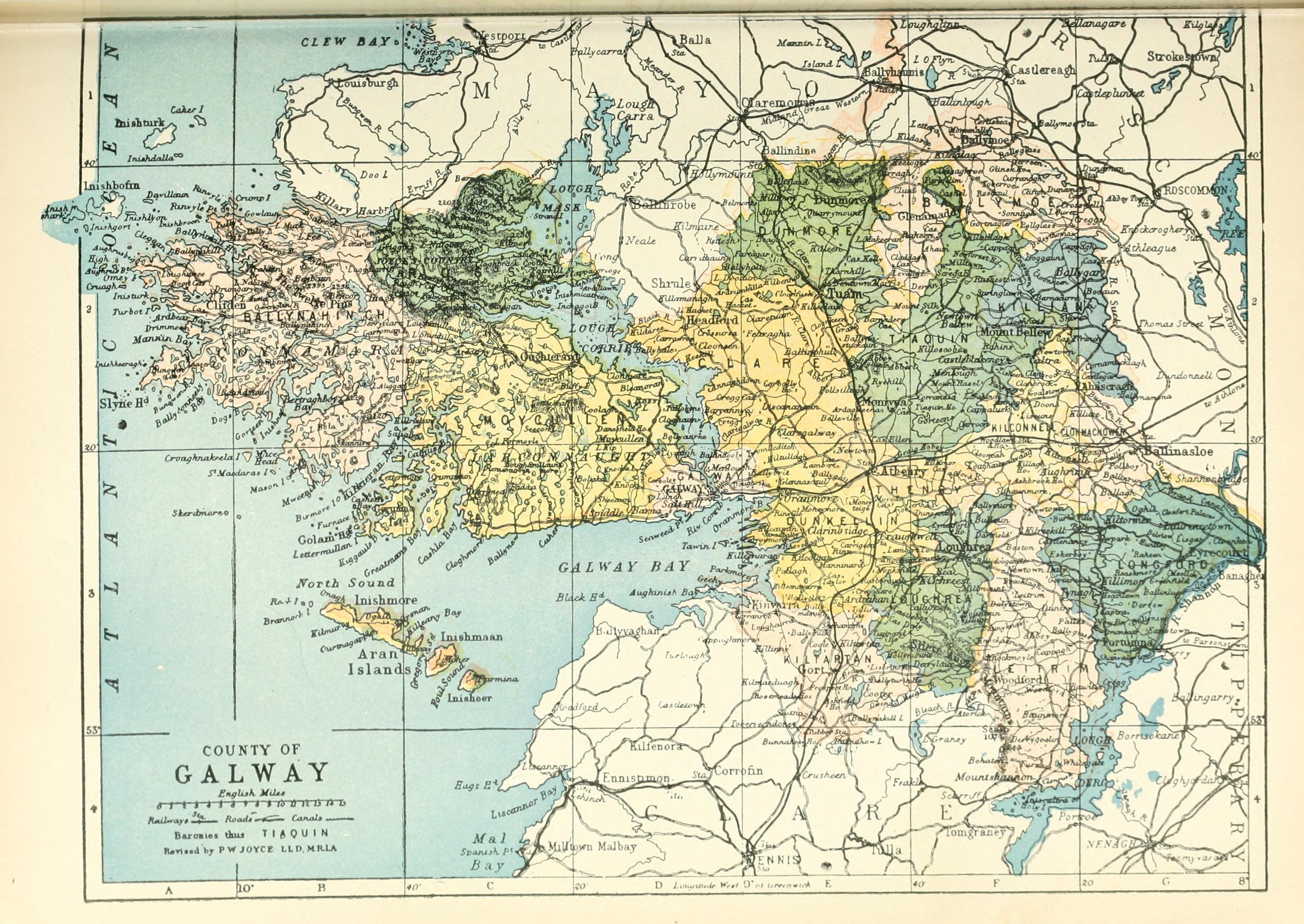
- Barony map of County Galway, 1900; Ross is in the northwest, coloured green.

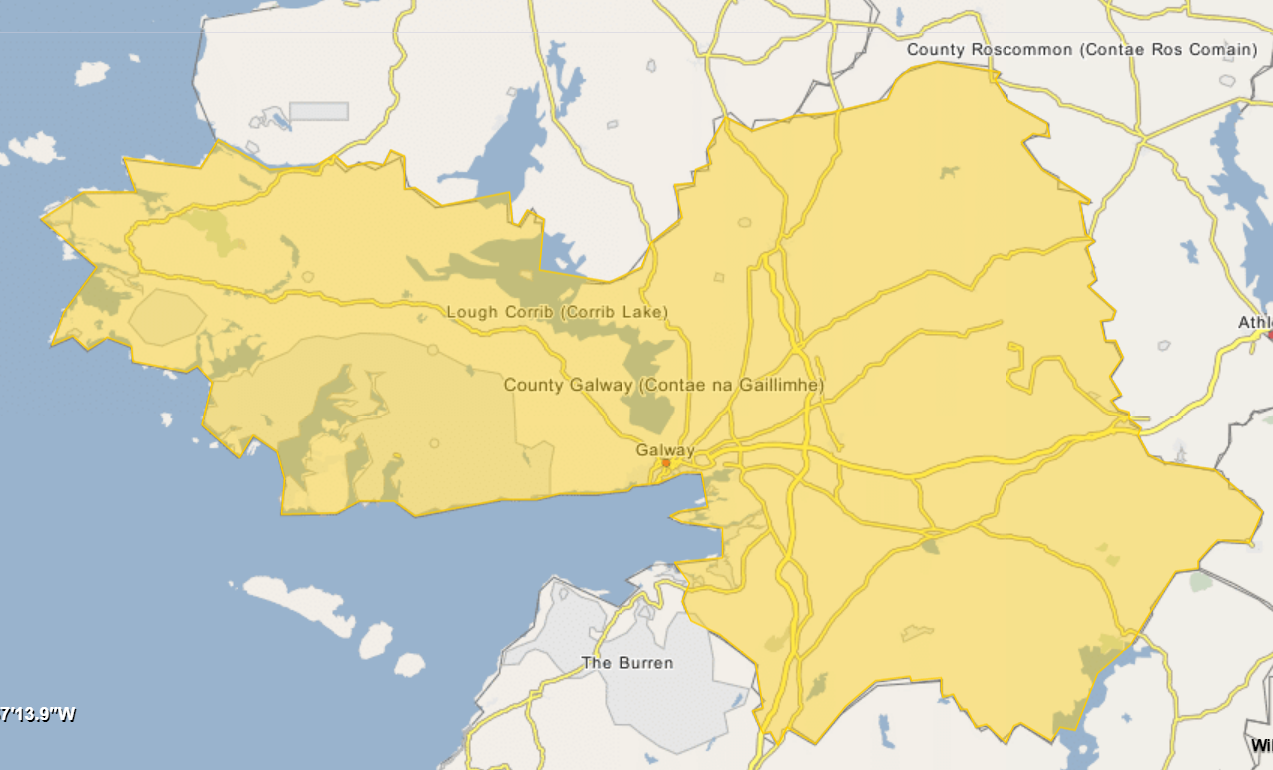
- Location within County Galway
- Coordinates: 53°34′N 9°33′W
- Sovereign state: Ireland
- Province: Connacht
- County: Galway; Mayo

Area
  - Total: 313.0 km^{2} (120.8 sq mi)

Ross (Irish: An Ros) is a historical barony in northern County Galway, Ireland; part of it is in County Mayo.

Baronies were mainly cadastral rather than administrative units. They acquired modest local taxation and spending functions in the 19th century before being superseded by the Local Government (Ireland) Act 1898.

== History ==
The name derived from Irish ros, meaning "promontory" or "peninsula." This originally referred to the narrow strip of land between Loughs Mask and Corrib.

This region was originally ruled by the Partraige (Partry) tribe. After allying with the Ó Flaithbheartaigh (Flahertys), the Anglo-Norman de Jorse (Joy, Joyce) family received grants of land here, and the area near here became part of Joyce Country.

Ross barony was created before 1574 and was part of County Mayo; it was transferred to County Galway in 1585. In 1898 the county border was redrawn, putting about a third of Ross into Mayo.

== Geography ==
Ross roughly corresponds to the traditional Joyce Country, and is extremely hilly. It is west of Lough Mask and Lough Corrib and east of Killary Harbour. Loch Na Fooey is near its centre.

== List of settlements ==
Settlements within the historical barony of Ross include:

- Cornamona (County Galway)
- Finny (County Mayo)
- Leenaun (County Galway)
- Maam Cross (County Galway)
