= Finny, County Mayo =

Village in County Mayo, Ireland

Finny Fionnaithe
- Village
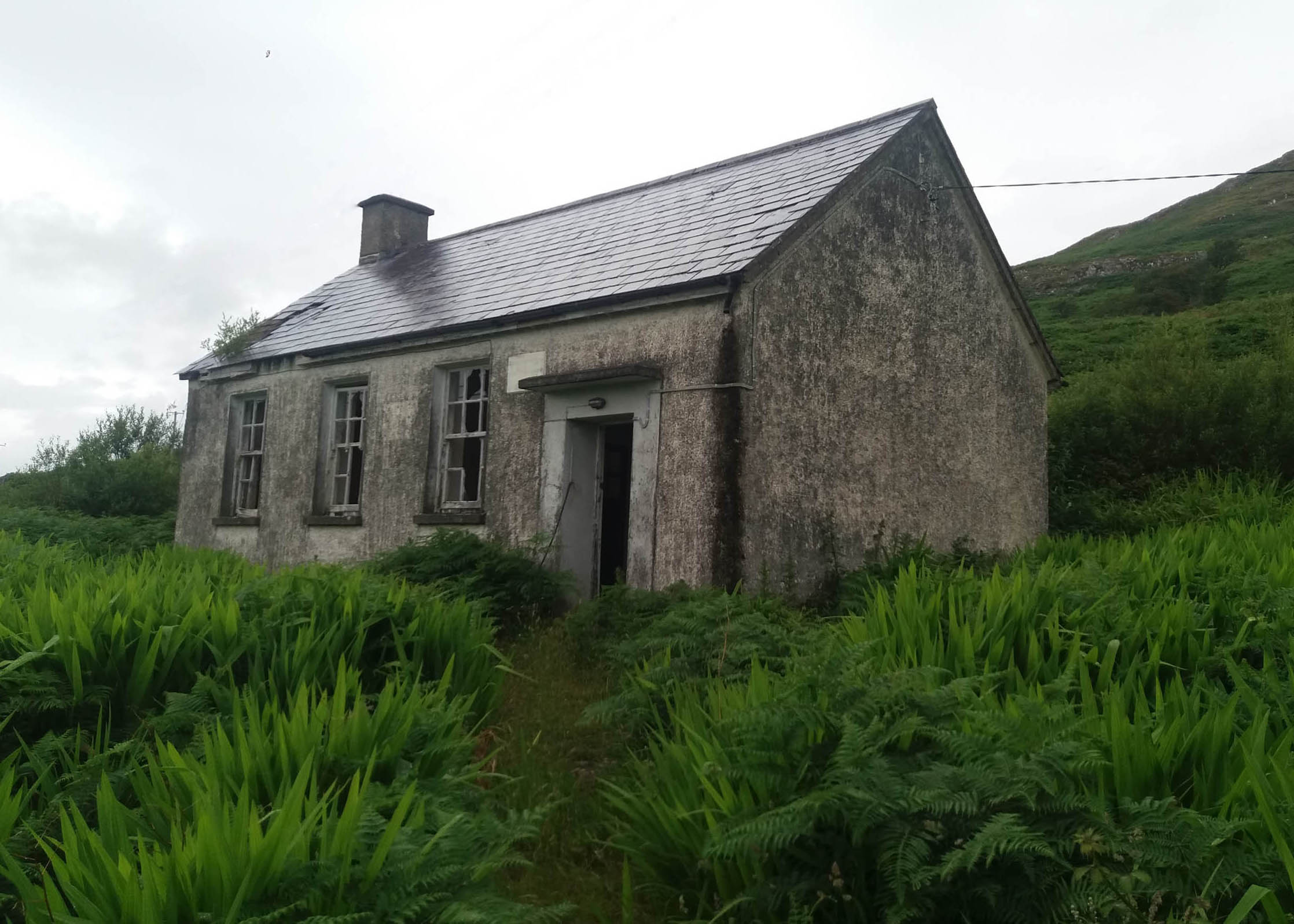
- Finny's former national (primary) school is now derelict

- Location in Ireland
- Coordinates: 53°34′15″N 9°29′35″W
- Country: Ireland
- Province: Connacht
- County: County Mayo
- Barony: Ross

Area
  - Total: 1.1493 km^{2} (0.4437 sq mi)
- Elevation: 22 m (72 ft)
- Time zone: UTC+0 (WET)
  - Summer (DST): UTC-1 (IST (WEST))

Finny or Finney (Irish: Fionnaithe, meaning 'places of rank vegetation') is a small village and townland in County Mayo in the west of Ireland. The village is situated in the civil parish of Ross, in the historical barony of Ross. Finny is located on the R300 regional road. The nearby Finny River, rising from the south-east of Loch Na Fooey, drains eastward into the southwest part of Lough Mask. Finny is approximately 10 km to the west of Clonbur, County Galway, 11 km to the east of Leenaun, County Galway and 17 km south west of Toormakeady, County Mayo.

== Culture ==
Finny is an Irish-speaking district within the Gaeltacht of south Mayo and is also located within the cultural district of Joyce Country.

== Religion ==
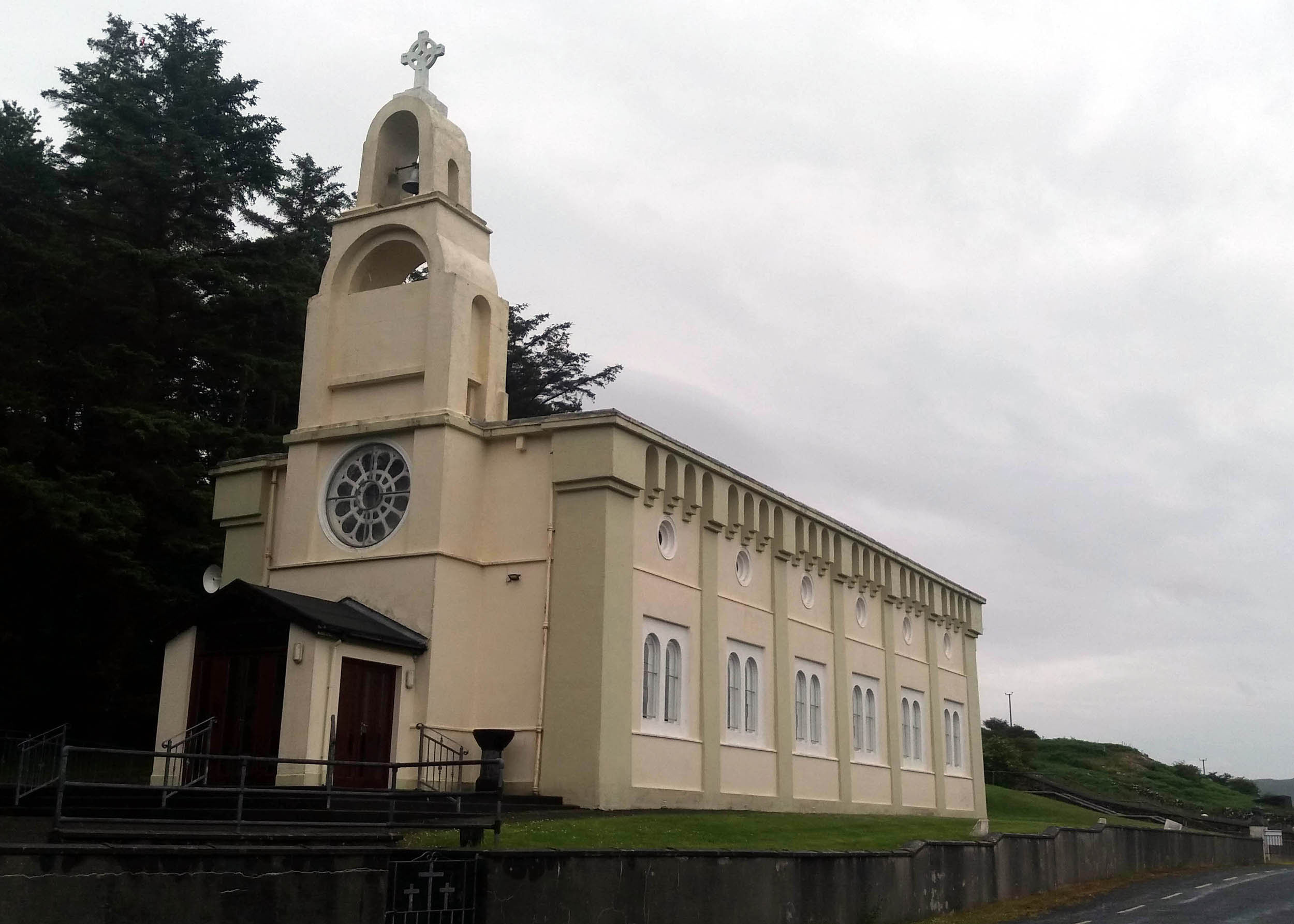
Exterior of the Church of the Immaculate Conception in Finny

The Catholic Church of the Immaculate Conception in Finny was completed in 1921. The building is unusual for the area in that it is Latin American in style evoking comparisons with Saint Patrick's Catholic Church in Recess, County Galway.

== See also ==
- List of towns and villages in the Republic of Ireland
