= List of shipwrecks in January 1878 =

The list of shipwrecks in January 1878 includes ships sunk, foundered, grounded, or otherwise lost during January 1878.

== 1 January ==
List of shipwrecks: 1 January 1878
Ship	State	Description
Alice C. Dickermans	United States	The schooner was driven ashore and capsized in the River Avon at Sea Mills, Gloucestershire, United Kingdom. She was on a voyage from Bristol, Gloucestershire to Cardiff, Glamorgan, United Kingdom. She was refloated the next day and taken in to Bristol.
Amazon	United Kingdom	The steamship was driven ashore and wrecked at the Pointe d'Azzemour, 11 nautical miles (20 km) west of Mazagan, Morocco. All on board were rescued. She was on a voyage from Gibraltar to one of the Barbary Coast ports.
Demetrius	United Kingdom	The steamship ran aground on the Ooster Bank. She was on a voyage from London to Rotterdam, South Holland, Netherlands.
Johanna Petronella	Netherlands	The schooner was driven ashore at Noordwijk, South Holland. Her crew were rescued. She was on a voyage from Rochester, Kent, United Kingdom to Amsterdam, North Holland.
Josephine	Russia	The barque was driven ashore at Dragør, Denmark. She was on a voyage from Turku, Grand Duchy of Finland to Southampton, Hampshire, United Kingdom.
Maria	Germany	The ship was driven ashore at Zandvoort, North Holland. Her crew were rescued. She was on a voyage from Hamburg to Trinidad and Ciudad Bolívar, Venezuela.
Marie Koestner	United Kingdom	The schooner departed from Liverpool, Lancashire for Port Madoc, Caernarfonshire. No further trace, reported missing. She may have been run down and sunk with the loss of all on board; wreckage thought to be from Marie Koestner was sighted 4 nautical miles (7.4 km) west by south of the North West Lightship ( Trinity House).
Olivier	France	The ship was driven ashore at "La Galle", Algeria.
Onega	United Kingdom	The steamship was driven ashore at Dragør. She was on a voyage from Danzig, Germany to London. She was refloated and taken in to Copenhagen, Denmark.
Promenader	United Kingdom	The brigantine was wrecked at Puerto Plata, Dominican Republic.
Seaton	United Kingdom	The steamship ran aground at Havre de Grâce, Seine-Inférieure.
Tom Pyman	United Kingdom	The steamship ran aground at Havre de Grâce.
Victory	United Kingdom	The ship departed from Charleston, South Carolina for Hull, Yorkshire. No further trace, reported missing.
Weser	Germany	The schooner was driven ashore on Terschelling, Friesland, Netherlands. Her crew were rescued. She was on a voyage from Hamburg to Porto, Portugal.
William Coulman	United Kingdom	The steamship struck the pier at Maassluis, South Holland, Netherlands, destroying the lighthouse. She was severely damaged and was beached with the loss of a crew member. She was on a voyage from Goole, Yorkshire to Rotterdam, South Holland.
W. W. Visser	Netherlands	The ship was driven ashore in the Nieuwe Diep. Her crew were rescued. She was on a voyage from London, United Kingdom to "Worcum".

== 2 January ==
List of shipwrecks: 2 January 1878
Ship	State	Description
Anne	Germany	The schooner foundered in the North Sea off Schouwen, Zeeland, Netherlands with the loss of all but one of her crew. She was on a voyage from Norway to Boulogne, Pas-de-Calais, France.
A. Strong	United Kingdom	The steamship was driven ashore on Nashawena Island, Massachusetts, United States. She was on a voyage from Cardiff, Glamorgan to Boston, Massachusetts. She was later refloated and found to be leaky.
Eleonora	United Kingdom	The barque was driven ashore at Souter Point, Northumberland. She was on a voyage from Kotka, Grand Duchy of Finland to Sunderland, County Durham. She was refloated and completed her voyage.
Ida	Denmark	The schooner foundered in the Dogger Bank with the loss of a crew member. Survivors were rescued by the smack Emma (United Kingdom). Ida was on a voyage from London to Newcastle upon Tyne, Northumberland, United Kingdom.
Landsend	United Kingdom	The steamship was driven ashore 1 nautical mile (1.9 km) north of the Heugh Lighthouse, County Durham. She was on a voyage from Pillau, Germany to Hartlepool, County Durham. She was refloated the next day with the assistance of six tugs and taken in to Stockton-on-Tees, County Durham.
Martha Lloyd	United Kingdom	The ship was driven ashore on Vlieland, Friesland, Netherlands. Her crew were rescued. She was on a voyage from Hamburg, Germany to Saint-Brieuc, Côtes-du-Nord, France.
Minerva	United Kingdom	The steamship ran aground on the North Bank, in the Irish Sea off the coast of County Dublin. She was on a voyage from Hull, Yorkshire to Dublin.
Peter Rohland	Germany	The barque was driven ashore and wrecked on Terschelling, Frieland. Her crew survived. She was on a voyage from Savannah, Georgia, United States to Bremen.
Suffolk	United Kingdom	The schooner sank at Dundee, Forfarshire. She was refloated on 5 January with the assistance of two barges. Subsequently broken up.

== 3 January ==
List of shipwrecks: 3 January 1878
Ship	State	Description
Carrie P. Morton	United States	The fishing schooner departed from Gloucester, Massachusetts. No further trace, probably lost on the Grand Banks of Newfoundland with the loss of all 14 crew.
Marshall Keith	United Kingdom	The ship was driven ashore at Newburgh, Fife. She was on a voyage from Copenhagen, Denmark to Peterhead, Aberdeenshire. She was refloated on 21 January and towed in to Newburgh.
Soukar	United Kingdom	The full-rigged ship ran aground on the Holm Sand, in the North Sea off the coast of Suffolk. She was on a voyage from Hamburg, Germany to London. She was refloated and taken in to Great Yarmouth, Norfolk.
Tocapilla	United Kingdom	The barque was driven ashore at Rhosilli, Glamorgan. She was later refloated.

== 4 January ==
List of shipwrecks: 4 January 1878
Ship	State	Description
Ana	Spain	The steamship struck the Ore Rocks, off Cape Cornwall, Cornwall, United Kingdom and was wrecked. All 35 people on board took to the boats; they were rescued by the steamship William Banks (United Kingdom). Ana was on a voyage from Liverpool, Lancashire, United Kingdom to Santander. Also reported as wrecked at Pendeen Cove.
Arcturus	United Kingdom	The steamship collided with another vessel off the Norwegian coast and was beached. She was refloated on 6 January and taken in to Bergen, Norway for repairs.
Argonaut	United Kingdom	The full-rigged ship was severely damaged by fire at London.
A. Strong	United Kingdom	The steamship was driven ashore on Nashawena Island, Massachusetts, United States. She was on a voyage from Boston, Massachusetts to New York, United States.
Balmoral	United Kingdom	The steamship was driven ashore and became waterlogged at Hartlepool, County Durham. Her eleven crew were rescued by the Hartlepool Lifeboat. She was on a voyage from Grangemouth, Stirlingshire to Middlesbrough, Yorkshire. She was refloated on 21 January with the assistance of five tugs and towed in to West Hartlepool.
Glenlivet	United Kingdom	The steamship collided with the steamship Staffa (United Kingdom) in the Clyde and was beached near Newark Castle, Port Glasgow, Renfrewshire, where she sank. Her crew were rescued by Staffa.
Janet and Alice	United Kingdom	The schooner ran aground at Deal, Kent. She was refloated.
J. T. Jackson	United Kingdom	The schooner ran aground on the Scroby Sands, Norfolk. She was on a voyage from London to Goole, Yorkshire. She was refloated and taken in to Great Yarmouth, Norfolk in a severely leaky condition.
Nordstjernen	Denmark	The steamship was driven ashore on Skagen. She was refloated with the assistance of a tug and taken in to Gothenburg, Sweden for repairs, being leaky.
Pa	Spain	The steamship was wrecked at Land's End, Cornwall, United Kingdom. All on board were rescued by the steamship William Banks (United Kingdom). Pa was on a voyage from Liverpool to Spain.
William Symington	United Kingdom	The steamship was driven ashore at Souter Point, Northumberland. She was refloated and put back to Sunderland, County Durham.

== 5 January ==
List of shipwrecks: 5 January 1878
Ship	State	Description
Oscar	United Kingdom	The steamship was driven ashore and wrecked at Whitby, Yorkshire. Her 27 crew were rescued by the Whitby Lifeboat Robert Whitworth ( Royal National Lifeboat Institution). Oscar was on a voyage from the River Tyne to Cádiz, Spain.
Miranda	Norway	The ship departed from Cardiff, Glamorgan, United Kingdom for Messina, Sicily, Italy. No further trace, presumed foundered with the loss of all hands.
Severn	United Kingdom	The steamship was driven ashore near the Cloch Lighthouse, Greenock, Renfrewshire. She was on a voyage from Greenock to Bristol, Gloucestershire.

== 6 January ==
List of shipwrecks: 6 January 1878
Ship	State	Description
Bridegroom	United Kingdom	The schooner was driven ashore 20 nautical miles (37 km) west of Ostend, West Flanders, Belgium. She was on a voyage from Hamburg, Germany to Cardiff, Glamorgan. She was refloated and resumed her voyage.
Edith Owen	United Kingdom	The steamship struck rocks in the River Avon and was damaged. She was on a voyage from Bristol, Gloucestershire to Liverpool, Lancashire. She put back to Bristol for repairs .
Sovereign	United Kingdom	The barque ran aground on the Cannon Rock, off the coast of County Down. She was on a voyage from a Brazilian port to Glasgow, Renfrewshire. She was refloated with the assistance of the tug Flying Dutchman (United Kingdom) and towed in to the Clyde in a severely leaky condition.
Stamfordham	United Kingdom	The steamship departed from Cape Henry, Virginia, United States for Ipswich, Suffolk. No further trace, reported missing.

== 7 January ==
List of shipwrecks: 7 January 1878
Ship	State	Description
August Lister	United Kingdom	The ship ran aground at Queenstown, County Cork. She was on a voyage from Queenstown to Liverpool, Lancashire. She was refloated with the assistance of a tug and resumed her voyage.
Glenalla	Canada	The ship departed from Baltimore, Maryland, United States for Queenstown. No further trace, reported missing.
Glide	Sweden	The brig was driven ashore at "Wiken", near Höganäs. She was on a voyage from Leith, Lothian, United Kingdom to Helsingborg.
Hudson	United States	The ship collided with a barque and was abandoned in the Atlantic Ocean (48°05′N 10°20′W) with the loss of one of her 32 crew. Survivors were rescued by the brigantine William Bowden (United Kingdom). Hudson was on a voyage from London, United Kingdom to New York.
Madge Wildfire	United Kingdom	The ship was driven ashore and severely damaged at the Point of Ayre, Isle of Man. Her crew were rescued. She was refloated on 19 January and towed in to Ramsey, Isle of Man.
Mary Ella	United States	The ship was abandoned in the Atlantic Ocean. Her crew were rescued by the steamship Crest (United Kingdom). Mary Ella was on a voyage from Newburyport, Massachusetts to New York.
Minnie	United Kingdom	The brig was driven ashore at Ayr.
Novelty	United Kingdom	The ship ran aground near "Siton" and was damaged. She was on a voyage from the Keeling Islands to Shanghai, China.
Tempois	Italy	The barque was driven ashore and wrecked at Hook Point, County Waterford, United Kingdom. She was on a voyage from Baltimore, Maryland to New Ross, County Wexford, United Kingdom.

== 8 January ==
List of shipwrecks: 8 January 1878
Ship	State	Description
Agnes	United Kingdom	The ketch was run into by the steamship Annie Vernon (United Kingdom) and sank in the River Thames with the loss of two of her four crew. Agnes was on a voyage from Antwerp, Belgium to London.
Glannibanta	United Kingdom	The steamship collided with the pier at Ostend, West Flanders, Belgium. She was on a voyage from Sunderland, County Durham to Ostend.
Jury	United States	The ship was driven ashore at Wilmington, Delaware. She was on a voyage from Wilmington to Trieste.
Lady Lampson	United Kingdom	The ship struck the Scrogas Rock, off Esquimalt, British Columbia, Canada and was beached near the Fishguard Lighthouse in a waterlogged condition. She was on a voyage from London to Esquimalt.
Marcia Greenleaf	United States	The ship was driven ashore at Beaufort, South Carolina. She was refloated.
Petronella	Sweden	The schooner was driven ashore between Dungeness and New Romney, Kent, United Kingdom. She was on a voyage from a Scottish port to Naples. She was refloated and taken in to Dover, Kent in a leaky condition.

== 9 January ==
List of shipwrecks: 9 January 1878
Ship	State	Description
Mary	(United Kingdom of Great Britain and Ireland) Isle of Man	The schooner was wrecked in Douglas Bay. Her crew were rescued.
Penseiro	Italy	The brigantine collided with the steamship Xema (United Kingdom) and sank in the Bristol Channel with the loss of all but one of her twelve crew. The survivor was rescued by Xema. Penseiro was on a voyage from Cardiff, Glamorgan, United Kingdom to Constantinople, Ottoman Empire.

== 10 January ==
List of shipwrecks: 10 January 1878
Ship	State	Description
Annie W. Goddard	Canada	The brig was driven ashore at Ferry Village, New York, United States.
Harriet P	United Kingdom	The ship ran aground at Shoreham-by-Sea, Sussex. She was on a voyage from Llanelly, Glamorgan to Newhaven, Sussex.
Margareta and Ann O'Rye	United Kingdom	The ship was run into by the schooner Athlete (United Kingdom) in the River Thames and was severely damaged.
Traffic	United Kingdom	The tender was in collision with the steamship Maggie Ann (United Kingdom) in the River Mersey at Liverpool, Lancashire. She was severely damaged and was beached.
Zephyr	Germany	The brig was wrecked on the Picquet Rocks, in the Bahamas, with some loss of life. She was on a voyage from Mobile, Alabama, United States to Hamburg.

== 11 January ==
List of shipwrecks: 11 January 1878
Ship	State	Description
Agnes	United Kingdom	The steamship was run down and sunk off the Nore by the steamship Annie Vernon (United Kingdom) with the loss of two of her crew.
Dunstanburgh	United Kingdom	The steamship ran aground on the Middle Blyth Sand, in the River Thames. She was on a voyage from London to South Shields, County Durham. She was refloated and resumed her voyage.
Edward Joseph	United Kingdom	The Thames barge was run into by the steamship Dunstanburgh (United Kingdom) and sank in the River Thames at Blackwall, Middlesex.
Leonore	United Kingdom	The ship was driven ashore at Pensacola, Florida, United States. She was on a voyage from Pensacola to Liverpool, Lancashire. She was refloated and put back to Pensacola.
Melancthon	Norway	The brigantine was wrecked on Rhodes, Greece. Her crew survived. She was on a voyage from Stavanger to Cagliari, Sicily, Italy.
Ulysses	United States	During a gale at night, the sidewheel paddle steamer broke loose from her moorings at the South Marine Railway Wharf at Rockland, Maine, and broke up on rocks in Rockland Harbor without loss of life.

== 12 January ==
List of shipwrecks: 12 January 1878
Ship	State	Description
Alert	United Kingdom	The schooner collided with the schooner Fellowcraft (United Kingdom) and was beached at McCrinan's Point, north of Campbeltown, Argyllshire. Alert was on a voyage from Troon, Ayrshire to Larne, County Antrim. She was refloated on 14 January.
Caledonian	United Kingdom	The schooner was driven ashore at Ballyness, County Donegal. She was on a voyage from Londonderry to Ballyness. She was refloated on 19 January and taken in to Ballyness.
Edward McDowell	United States	The ship was wrecked in the San Luis Pass. She was on a voyage from Liverpool, Lancashire, United Kingdom to Galveston, Texas.
Endymion	United Kingdom	The ship ran aground in the Yangtze. She was on a voyage from Newcastle upon Tyne, Northumberland to Shanghai, China. She was later refloated and taken in to Shanghai.
Excelsior	New Zealand	The 92-ton topsail schooner left Timaru for Wellington with a crew of six. She was not seen again. Wreckage, possibly from Excelsior, was spotted off the Banks Peninsula in February 1878.
Gange	France	The steamship collided with the steamship Henry Coxon (United Kingdom) and sank on the Blythe Sand, in the River Thames. Gange was on a voyage from London, United Kingdom to Marseille, Bouches-du-Rhône. She was refloated on 15 January and subsequently taken in to Greenhithe, Kent, United Kingdom.
Stentor	United Kingdom	The steamship was damaged by fire at Swansea, Glamorgan.

== 13 January ==
List of shipwrecks: 13 January 1878
Ship	State	Description
Enterprise	(United Kingdom of Great Britain and Ireland) Jersey	The lugger collided with the schooner Forest Fairy (United Kingdom) and sank off Holyhead, Anglesey with the loss of one life. Enterprise was on a voyage from Liverpool, Lancashire to Padstow, Cornwall.
Fairy	United Kingdom	The schooner ran aground on the Maplin Sand, in the North Sea off the coast of Essex. She was on a voyage from Grimsby, Lincolnshire to Gravesend, Kent. She was refloated.
Intrepid	United Kingdom	The ketch was run down and sunk off the South Stack, Anglesey by the schooner Forest Fairy (United Kingdom) with the loss of one of the five people on board. Intrepid was on a voyage from Liverpool to Wadebridge, Cornwall.
Nellie	New Zealand	The 66-ton schooner struck Astrolabe Reef, eventually grounding on Motiti Island, Bay of Plenty while en route from Lyttelton Harbour to Auckland. Her crew survived.

== 14 January ==
List of shipwrecks: 14 January 1878
Ship	State	Description
Canadienne	France	The ship was lost in a cyclone at Réunion with the loss of twelve of her nineteen crew.
Cincora	Italy	The steamship ran aground in the Seine. She was on a voyage from Barletta to Havre de Grâce, Seine-Inférieure, France. She was refloated with the assistance of a tug.
Fervent	United Kingdom	The steamship ran aground in the Seine. She was refloated.
Hermann	Germany	The steamship arrived at New York, United States from Hamburg on fire. The fire was extinguished.
Intibakh	Ottoman Navy	Russo-Turkish War: The dispatch boat was sunk at Batumi by two torpedoes fired by the torpedo launches Chesme and Sinope (both Imperial Russian Navy) in the first successful use of self-propelled torpedoes in combat.
Osprey	United Kingdom	The steamship ran aground on the Rhinplatte, in the North Sea off the German coast. She was on a voyage from London to Hamburg, Germany.
Pigeon	United Kingdom	The brigantine sank in the River Mersey off Waterloo, Lancashire with the loss of all hands. She was on a voyage from Dublin to Liverpool, Lancashire.

== 15 January ==
List of shipwrecks: 15 January 1878
Ship	State	Description
Alliance	Portugal	The barque ran aground in the Douro. She was on a voyage from Porto to Rio de Janeiro, Brazil.
Wil Dayrell	United Kingdom	The barque was towed in to Harwich, Essex in a derelict condition by the steamship Lily Dale (United Kingdom).

== 16 January ==
List of shipwrecks: 16 January 1878
Ship	State	Description
Frithjof	Norway	The steamship was severely damaged by an onboard explosion which killed a crew member. She was on a voyage from Cardiff, Glamorgan, United Kingdom to Cádiz, Spain.

== 17 January ==
List of shipwrecks: 17 January 1878
Ship	State	Description
C.L. Henning	United Kingdom	The ship departed from Troon, Ayrshire for Demerara, British Guiana. No further trace, reported missing.
Ripple	United Kingdom	The ship ran aground on the Banjaard Sand, in the North Sea off the coast of Zeeland, Netherlands. Her crew were rescued.

== 18 January ==
List of shipwrecks: 18 January 1878
Ship	State	Description
Grace Darling	United States	The medium clipper was sighted on this date by Melancthon (United States). No further trace, presumed foundered with the loss of all eighteen crew.
Swift	United Kingdom	The steamship was driven ashore in the River Thames between Northfleet, Kent and Tilbury, Essex. She was on a voyage from Ostend, West Flanders, Belgium to London.
Uno	Austria-Hungary	The brig was driven ashore at Pola. She was on a voyage from Swansea, Glamorgan, United Kingdom to Pola. She was refloated and taken in to Pola.

== 19 January ==
List of shipwrecks: 19 January 1878
Ship	State	Description
Amistad	Spain	The ship sprang a leak and was beached at "Portopico", on the west coast of Sardinia, Italy.
Elizabeth	United Kingdom	The schooner was driven ashore at Ballyness, County Donegal.
Frank Cotton	United States	The schooner was wrecked at Greytown, Nicaragua. She was on a voyage from Philadelphia, Pennsylvania to Greytown.
Mizpah	United Kingdom	The schooner was driven ashore at Ballyness.
Uno	Flag unknown	The ship was driven ashore at Pola, Austria-Hungary. She was on a voyage from London, United Kingdom to Pola. She was refloated and taken in to Pola.

== 20 January ==
List of shipwrecks: 20 January 1878
Ship	State	Description
Auguste Solscher	Germany	The barque ran aground on the Kentish Knock and sank. All on board got aboard the Kentish Knock Lightship ( Trinity House), from where they were rescued on 7 February by the smack Emily (United Kingdom). August Solscher was on a voyage from Hamburg to Valparaíso, Chile.
Benbow, and Ostrich	United Kingdom	The steamships collided in the River Thames downstream of Blackwall, Middlesex. Benbow was on a voyage from Rotterdam, South Holland, Netherlands to Deptford, Kent. She was severely damaged. Ostrich was on a voyage from London to Newcastle upon Tyne, Northumberland. She sank with the loss of five lives. Ostrich was refloated in late January.
Countess of Durham	United Kingdom	The steamship was driven ashore and wrecked at Youghal, County Cork.
Delopia	United Kingdom	The brig was driven ashore and wrecked on South Uist, Orkney Islands. Her crew were rescued. She was on a voyage from Langesund, Norway to Connah's Quay, Flintshire.
Enterprise	United Kingdom	The ship ran aground on the Goodwin Sands, Kent. She was on a voyage from Dunkerque, Nord, France to Liverpool, Lancashire. She was refloated and resumed her voyage.
Giuseppe Bozzo	Italy	The barque was driven ashore and wrecked at Newton-by-the-Sea, Northumberland, United Kingdom. Her crew survived. She was on a voyage from Philadelphia, Pennsylvania, United States to Leith, Lothian, United Kingdom.
Lord Willoughby	United Kingdom	The schooner ran aground and sank off Maryport, Cumberland. Her crew were rescued. She was on a voyage from Bangor, Caernarfonshire to Silloth, Cumberland.
Otto Frieda	Germany	The ship was driven ashore at "Twersted", Denmark. She was refloated and assisted in to Fredrikshavn for repairs.

== 21 January ==
List of shipwrecks: 21 January 1878
Ship	State	Description
Adeona	Saint Vincent	The ship was driven ashore and wrecked near Kingston, Jamaica.
Amanda	United Kingdom	The ship departed from Pensacola, Florida, United States for Marseille, Bouches-du-Rhône, France. No further trace, reported missing.
A. Patterson	United Kingdom	The brig ran aground on Scroby Sands, Norfolk. She was refloated with the assistance of a tug and taken in to Great Yarmouth, Norfolk.
Caliban	United Kingdom	The Mersey Flat collided with the steamship Bolivar (United Kingdom) and sank at Liverpool, Lancashire.
Catherine	United Kingdom	The schooner was driven ashore at Kingsdown, Kent. She was on a voyage from Par, Cornwall to London. She was refloated.
Charlotte	United Kingdom	The cutter sank in the River Severn at Chepstow, Monmouthshire. Her crew were rescued. She was on a voyage from Lydney, Gloucestershire to Weston-super-Mare, Somerset.
Fairy Queen	United Kingdom	The schooner was driven ashore on Bressay, Shetland Islands.
Galatea	Germany	The ship was driven ashore at San Francisco, California, United States. She was on a voyage from Hong Kong to San Francisco.
John Wells	United Kingdom	The steamship ran aground in the Seine near Villequier, Seine-Inférieure, France.
Royalist	United Kingdom	The ship, a floating police station, was run into by the steamship Chimborazo at East Greenwich, Kent and was severely damaged.
Vanguard	United Kingdom	The schooner was beached at New Brighton, Cheshire. She was on a voyage from Nairn to Liverpool. She was refloated and taken in to Liverpool.
Unnamed	United Kingdom	The steam flat ran aground on the Dove Spit, in Liverpool Bay.
Unnamed	Norway	The barque was driven ashore at Sønderho, Denmark.

== 22 January ==
List of shipwrecks: 22 January 1878
Ship	State	Description
Arctic	United Kingdom	The barque ran aground on the Kentish Knock or the Longsand, in the North Sea off the coast of Essex. Eleven of her thirteen crew were taken off by a smack. Arctic was on a voyage from Ostend, West Flanders, Belgium to Swansea, Glamorgan. She was refloated and towed in to Harwich, Essex.
Baring Brothers, and Ponce	United States; Spain	The steamship Ponce collided with the full-rigged ship Baring Brothers and sank at the mouth of the River Mersey off the Crosby Lightship ( Trinity House) with the loss of two of her 30 crew. Survivors were rescued by the tug Columbus (United Kingdom). Ponce was on a voyage from Liverpool, Lancashire, United Kingdom to Puerto Rico. The wreck was subsequently dispersed by explosives. Baring Brothers was on a voyage from America to Liverpool. She was severely damaged and was beached near Seacombe, Cheshire, United Kingdom. She was refloated the next day and taken in to Birkenhead, Cheshire.
Chestina Redman	United States	The ship ran aground on the Kaloot Bank, in the North Sea off the coast of Zeeland, Netherlands. She was on a voyage from Boston, Massachusetts to Antwerp, Belgium. She was refloated and taken in to Vlissingen, Zeeland.
Entrepreneur	France	The ship was driven ashore at the Whiteford Lighthouse, Glamorgan, United Kingdom.
Helen	United Kingdom	The brigantine ran aground on the Newcombe Sand, in the North Sea off the coast of Suffolk. She was on a voyage from Sunderland, County Durham to Ramsgate, Kent. She was refloated with the assistance of tugs and taken in to Lowestoft, Suffolk.
Oreala	Flag unknown	The steamship ran aground on the Kaloot Bank, in the North Sea off the coast of Zeeland, Netherlands. She was on a voyage from Brazil to Antwerp, Belgium.

== 23 January ==
List of shipwrecks: 23 January 1878
Ship	State	Description
Bessie Jane	United Kingdom	The smack was driven ashore at Padstow, Cornwall. She was refloated and taken in to Padstow in a waterlogged condition.
Copeland	United Kingdom	The fishing smack was run into by the steamship Myrtle (United Kingdom) and wrecked at Portrush, County Antrim.
Southtown	United Kingdom	The schooner sank at Irvine, Ayrshire.
Unnamed	United Kingdom	The fishing smack was run into by the steamship Myrtle (United Kingdom) and wrecked at Portrush.

== 24 January ==
List of shipwrecks: 24 January 1878
Ship	State	Description
Black Eyed Susan	United Kingdom	The ship ran aground at "Killapool", County Mayo. She was on a voyage from Santander, Spain to Ballina, County Mayo.
Ina	United Kingdom	The fishing trawler collided with Bohemian Girl (United Kingdom) and sank in the English Channel off the coast of Devon with the loss of one of her four crew. Survivors were rescued by Bohemian Girl.
Utility	United Kingdom	The schooner was driven ashore and wrecked at Preesall, Lancashire with the loss of one of her six crew. She was on a voyage from Fleetwood, Lancashire to Belfast, County Antrim. She was later refloated.
Unnamed	United Kingdom	The steamship was driven ashore at Macgilligan Point, County Donegal. She was on a voyage from Londonderry to Glasgow, Renfrewshire.

== 25 January ==
List of shipwrecks: 25 January 1878
Ship	State	Description
Branch	United Kingdom	The schooner was driven ashore and wrecked at Largibeg, Isle of Arran. Her crew were rescued.
Caspian	United Kingdom	The ship ran aground at Havre de Grâce, Seine-Inférieure, France. She was on a voyage from Savannah, Georgia, United States to Havre de Grâce.
Comterre Duchatel	France	The barque ran aground in the Charente. She was on a voyage from Rochefort, Charente-Inférieure to New Orleans, Louisiana, United States.
Grasmere	United Kingdom	The steamship struck a sunken rock at Portpatrick, Wigtownshire and was damaged. She was on a voyage from Whitehaven, Cumberland to the Clyde. She was taken in to Portpatrick in a waterlogged condition and placed under repair.
Helding	Spain	The brig was driven ashore at Magilligan, County Londonderry, United Kingdom with the loss of six of her nine crew. She was on a voyage from Glasgow, Renfrewshire, United Kingdom to the West Indies.
Isabella	United Kingdom	The ship ran aground in the Belfast Lough.
King Philip	United States	The wreck of King Philip on 28 March 2011 The three-masted sailing clipper was wrecked at Ocean Beach, San Francisco, California after her anchor dragged and she ran aground in heavy surf.
Marco Primogento	Austria-Hungary	The barque was wrecked on the north coast of Cornwall, United Kingdom with the loss of all but two of her crew. She was on a voyage from Alexandria, Egypt to Cork, United Kingdom.
Olinkau	Austria-Hungary	The brig was wrecked on the Kish Bank, in the Irish Sea off the coast of County Dublin, United Kingdom. Her twelve crew were rescued by the Kingstown Lifeboat. She was on a voyage from Philadelphia, Pennsylvania, United States to Dublin.
Pioneer	United Kingdom	The steamship was driven ashore on Puffin Island, Anglesey with the loss of three of her crew. Survivors were rescued by the Penmon Lifeboat. She was on a voyage from Maryport, Cumberland to Antwerp, Belgium.
Pioneer	United Kingdom	The steamship foundered off Padstow, Cornwall with the loss of all hands. She was on a voyage from Swansea, Glamorgan to Hayle, Cornwall.
Providence	United Kingdom	The smack was driven ashore and wrecked in Loch Tarbert, Jura. She was on a voyage from Londonderry to "Losses".
Reindeer	United Kingdom	The brig ran aground on the Barnard Sand, in the North Sea off the coast of Suffolk. She was on a voyage from Shoreham-by-Sea, Sussex to London. She floated off and sank with the loss of her captain. Five crew reached the shore in a boat.
Times	United Kingdom	The steamship ran aground on the Craigough Rock. She was on a voyage from Dundee, Forfarshire to Leith, Lothian. She was refloated.
Wanderer	Canada	The brigantine was driven ashore at Bayonne, Basses-Pyrénées, France. Her crew were rescued.
William and Anna	United Kingdom	The brig was run down and sunk in the North Sea off the Swin Middle Lightship ( Trinity House) by the steamship Tabor (United Kingdom) with the loss of four of her seven crew. Survivors were rescued by Tabor. William and Anna was on a voyage from Rochester, Kent to Seaham, County Durham.
William Naizby	United Kingdom	The barque collided with the steamship Romeo (United Kingdom) off Great Yarmouth, Norfolk and was abandoned by her crew, who got aboard Romeo. William Naizby was on a voyage from the Milk River, Jamaica to Goole, Yorkshire. She was subsequently towed in to Harwich, Essex.
Unnamed	United Kingdom	The Mersey Flat sank at Liverpool, Lancashire. Her crew were rescued.
Unnamed	United Kingdom	The pilot coble sank off South Shields, County Durham with the loss of three of the four people on board.

== 26 January ==
List of shipwrecks: 26 January 1878
Ship	State	Description
Acme	Denmark	The schooner was severely damaged by fire at Gibraltar. She was on a voyage from Genoa, Italy to Rio de Janeiro, Brazil.
Bengairn	United Kingdom	The steamship ran aground at Liverpool, Lancashire. She was on a voyage from Garston, Lancashire to Plymouth, Devon. She was refloated and put back to Garston in a leaky condition.
Dorcas	United Kingdom	The steamship was driven ashore at Sunderland, County Durham. She was on a voyage from London to Sunderland. She was refloated the next day with the assistance of five tugs.
George and Mary	United Kingdom	The ship was driven ashore and wrecked at Shurton, Somerset.
Laure	United Kingdom	The schooner was wrecked at Roscoff, Finistère, France. She was on a voyage from a Scottish port to Bilbao, Spain.
Mary and Ann	United Kingdom	The brig was run down and sunk off Great Yarmouth, Norfolk with the loss of four of her five crew.
Meggie Armstrong	United Kingdom	The brig was driven ashore and wrecked at "Porto Torros", Spain.
Myrtle	United Kingdom	The steamship was beached in Ballycastle Bay, where she was wrecked.
Queen Victoria	United Kingdom	The barque was driven ashore at Rotterdam, South Holland, Netherlands.
Rose of Eden	New Zealand	The 30-ton schooner struck a rock in Tory Channel in Marlborough Sounds and became a wreck. All hands survived.
Unnamed	Flag unknown	The barque ran aground on the Goodwin Sands, Kent, United Kingdom.

== 27 January ==
List of shipwrecks: 27 January 1878
Ship	State	Description
Active	United Kingdom	The schooner was driven ashore at Covehithe, Suffolk. She was on a voyage from Inverness to Penryn, Cornwall. She was refloated and taken in to Lowestoft, Suffolk.
Constitution	United Kingdom	The tug collided with the steamship Mary Hough (United Kingdom) in the River Mersey and was severely damaged. She was taken in to Liverpool, Lancashire for repairs.
Diana	United Kingdom	The steamship was driven ashore 2 nautical miles (3.7 km) east of the Hook Lighthouse, County Waterford. Her crew were rescued. She was on a voyage from Liverpool to Waterford.
Discoverer	United Kingdom	The steamship ran aground in the Hooghly River. She was on a voyage from Calcutta to Bombay, India.
Margaret and Martha	United Kingdom	The schooner was driven ashore at Abermenai Point, Anglesey.
Prince Alfred	United Kingdom	The ship was abandoned off Ouessant, Finistère, France. Her crew were rescued by a Swedish vessel. Prince Alfred was on a voyage from Pensacola, Florida, United States to Sharpness, Gloucestershire. She came ashore at Plouescat, Finistère on 31 January and was wrecked.
Prospero	Italy	The barque ran aground on the Goodwin Sands, Kent, United Kingdom. She was on a voyage from North Shields, Northumberland, United Kingdom to Genoa. She was refloated with the assistance of two tugs and the Ramsgate Lifeboat and taken in tow for Gravesend, Kent.
Raven	New Zealand	The 6-ton cutter left Picton for Wellington with a crew of three. She was not seen again.
Santander	United Kingdom	The steamship ran aground at Workington, Cumberland. She was on a voyage from Maryport to Workington. She was refloated on 1 February.

== 28 January ==
List of shipwrecks: 28 January 1878
Ship	State	Description
Allahabad	India	The ship put in to Galle, Ceylon on fire. She was on a voyage from Calcutta to New York, United States.
Amphitrite	Netherlands	The ship ran aground in the Nieuwe Diep. She was refloated with the assistance of two tugs.
Arctic	United Kingdom	The barque was driven ashore at Kingsdown, Kent. She was on a voyage from Swansea, Glamorgan to Ostend, Belgium. She was refloated and taken in to The Downs.
Constance Reggina	Italy	The ship was wrecked on L'Île-Rousse, Corsica, France.
Fanny	United Kingdom	The schooner ran aground on the West Hoyle Bank, in Liverpool Bay and was severely damaged. She was on a voyage from Barrow-in-Furness, Lancashire to Waterford.
John Bright	United Kingdom	The ship ran aground on the Goodwin Sands, Kent and sank. Her crew survived.
Meredith	United Kingdom	The steamship was driven ashore at Jérémie, Haiti. She was refloated and taken in to Port-au-Prince, Haiti. She was later refloated and found to be leaky.
Satyr	United Kingdom	The schooner was wrecked on the Doom Bar. Her five crew were rescued by a pilot boat. She was on a voyage from Cardiff, Glamorgan to Ballinacurra, County Cork.
Wennington	United Kingdom	The ship went aground and re-floated in the Bali Strait. She had departed from Samarang, Netherlands East Indies for Falmouth on 9 January, and as of September has not been heard of.

== 29 January ==
List of shipwrecks: 29 January 1878
Ship	State	Description
Emigrant	Sweden	The ship was wrecked on the Kentish Knock. Her ten crew were rescued by the steamship Lechmere (United Kingdom).
Fearless	(United Kingdom of Great Britain and Ireland) Guernsey	The schooner was driven ashore at Winchelsea, Sussex. Her crew were rescued by the Winchelsea Lifeboat. She was on a voyage from Guernsey to London.
Francisco Raffo	Spain	The ship was driven ashore and wrecked at Lagos, Portugal. Her crew were rescued. She was on a voyage from Cádiz to Hamburg, Germany.
Laura	United Kingdom	The schooner was driven ashore near Roscoff, Finistère, France. She was refloated in mid-February and taken in to Roscoff for repairs.
Lively	United Kingdom	The schooner was driven ashore at Whitby, Yorkshire.
Mary and Sarah	United Kingdom	The Thames barge collided with the steamship Hawk (United Kingdom) and sank in the River Thames.
Prinses Marie	Netherlands	The steamship collided with the steamship Zuid Holland at Vlissingen, Zeeland and was severely damaged.
Rainton	United Kingdom	The steamship caught fire at Marbella, Spain and was scuttled the next day with the loss of a crew member. She broke in two in a gale on 6 February.

== 30 January ==
List of shipwrecks: 30 January 1878
Ship	State	Description
Ardelines	United Kingdom	The ship ran aground at Maryport, Cumberland. She was on a voyage from Glenarm, County Antrim to Maryport. She was refloated the next day.
Arethusa	United Kingdom	The brig was wrecked on "Tabarka Island", Algeria with the loss of seven of her nine crew.
Auk	United Kingdom	The steamship was damaged by fire at Liverpool, Lancashire.
Paul Grampp	United Kingdom	The schooner ran aground on the Scroby Sands, Norfolk. She was on a voyage from Newcastle upon Tyne, Northumberland to Bari, Italy. She was refloated and assisted in to Great Yarmouth, Norfolk.
Rainton	United Kingdom	The ship caught fire at Marbella, Spain. She sank the next day with the loss of a crew member.

== 31 January ==
List of shipwrecks: 31 January 1878
Ship	State	Description
Astarte	United Kingdom	The steamship was wrecked at Castillos, Uruguay with the loss of all 32 crew. She was on a voyage from Cardiff, Glamorgan to Montevideo, Uruguay.
Claribel	United Kingdom	The barque ran aground in the Clyde. She was on a voyage from the Clyde to Saint Kitts.
Elizabeth Ann	United Kingdom	The steamship Jane Bacon was towing the steamship Cingalese (both United Kingdom when the tow rope caught the mast of the ketch Elizabeth Ann, which capsized and sank off Godrevy, Cornwall with the loss of one of her four crew. Survivors were rescued by Jane Bacon.
Elphinstone	United Kingdom	The ship was driven ashore at Cape Delaware, United States. She was on a voyage from Philadelphia, Pennsylvania, United States to Liverpool, Lancashire.
Etta M. Tucker	United States	The ship was driven ashore and wrecked at Asbury Park, New Jersey.
Geraldine Paget	United Kingdom	The ship was damaged by fire at Calcutta, India. She was on a voyage from Calcutta to London.
Metropolis	United States	The steamship was wrecked at Currituck Beach, North Carolina with the loss of 85 lives. She was on a voyage from New York to Pernambuco, Brazil.
Neotune	United Kingdom	The ship ran aground at "Sapsic, Georgia", United States. She was on a voyage from Liverpool to Darien, Georgia. She was refloated and towed in to Savannah, Georgia, where she was condemned.
Providence	France	The sloop sprang a leak and sank off the Runnel Stone, Cornwall. Her three crew were rescued. She was on a voyage from Cardiff to Nantes, Loire-Inférieure.
Zawia	Norway	The ship sank off the Little Skerries, in the Pentland Firth. Her crew were rescued. She was on a voyage from Connah's Quay, Flintshire, United Kingdom to Arendal.
Zeno	United Kingdom	The barque ran aground at Berwick upon Tweed, Northumberland. She was on a voyage from Huelva, Spain to Berwick upon Tweed.

== Unknown date ==
List of shipwrecks: Unknown date in January 1878
Ship	State	Description
Albert and Edward	United Kingdom	The steamship was lost off the coast of Norfolk on or before 5 January with the loss of all eighteen crew. She was on a voyage from Sunderland, County Durham to London.
Alcedo	United Kingdom	The brigantine was driven ashore at Dry Harbour, Jamaica. She was refloated.
Anna	United Kingdom	The steamship was driven ashore near "Landsend".
Annie Laurie	Netherlands	The schooner sprang a leak and foundered off the Turtle Bank. All on board were rescued by a French vessel. She was on a voyage from Paramaribo to Nieuw Nickerie, Surinam.
Antoinetta	Italy	The barque was abandoned in the Atlantic Ocean before 4 January. She was on a voyage from New York to Penarth, Glamorgan, United Kingdom.
Auguste Marie	United Kingdom	The ketch ran aground on the Pennington Spit, off the coast of Hampshire, United Kingdom. She was on a voyage from Dunkerque, Nord to Saint-Brieuc, Côtes-du-Nord.
Auvergne	France	The steamship was wrecked on "Tabarka Island", Beylik of Tunis. Her crew were rescued. She was subsequently plundered by local Arabs.
Burnbrae	United Kingdom	The barque foundered in the Atlantic Ocean. Her crew were rescued. She was on a voyage from Demerara, British Guiana to Queenstown, County Cork.
Claudia	United Kingdom	The schooner was wrecked in the Tonalá River before 4 January.
Cornwallis	United Kingdom	The ship was wrecked on Pitcairn Island. Her crew were rescued.
Emperor	United Kingdom	The smack was driven ashore at Grimsby, Lincolnshire. She was destroyed by a fire caused by a distress flare.
Energia	United Kingdom	The ship was wrecked on the French Reef before 3 January. She was on a voyage from New Orleans, Louisiana, United States to Queenstown.
Francisca Bellagamba	Italy	The barque was driven ashore at Cape Henry, Virginia, United States.
Francoise Desiree	Netherlands	The ship was wrecked near "Larbavrach", Finistère, France with the loss of all but one of her crew. She was on a voyage from Saint Lucia to a Dutch port.
Frederick	United Kingdom	The ship was driven ashore at Westhampton, New York, United States. She was on a voyage from Leith, Lothian to New York City.
Hannah Law	United Kingdom	The ship was abandoned in the Atlantic Ocean. Her crew were rescued by Minniehaha (United Kingdom).
Idlewild	Canada	The brigantine was wrecked at Cape George, Nova Scotia. She was on a voyage from Cádiz to Halifax, Nova Scotia.
Isabella	United Kingdom	The brig foundered in the Mediterranean Sea with the loss of five of her eight crew. She was on a voyage from Gibraltar to Livorno, Italy.
Julia Ernestine	France	The ship was driven ashore at Pensacola, Florida, United States.
Jupiter	Germany	The barque departed from Bremerhaven for New York. No further trace, presumed foundered in the Atlantic Ocean with the loss of all hands.
Leicester	United Kingdom	The ship was driven ashore and wrecked at "Catchian". All on board were rescued.
Marc Antoine	France	The ship was driven ashore near Karikal, Puducherry. She was on a voyage from Pondicherry, Puducherry to Mauritius.
Mary Ann Wilson	United Kingdom	The barque was wrecked on the Little Paternosters, in the Makassar Strait. Her cew were rescued. She was on a voyage from Liverpool, Lancashire to Mindanao, Spanish East Indies.
Nerio	(United Kingdom of Great Britain and Ireland) Jersey	The abandoned brigantine was wrecked near Tréguier, Côtes-du-Nord, France.
Nordhavet	Flag unknown	The ship was abandoned on the North Sea. Her crew were rescued.
Ornen	Flag unknown	The ship was driven ashore. She was on a voyage from Philadelphia, Pennsylvania to Queenstown, County Cork, United Kingdom. She was refloated and taken in to the Delaware Breakwater.
Perou	Norway	The barque was abandoned in the Atlantic Ocean before 23 January. She was on a voyage from Pensacola to Bremen, Germany.
Providentia	Spain	The ship was wrecked at North Cape. She was on a voyage from Mexico to Barcelona.
Rosa May	United Kingdom	The steamship ran aground on a reef in the Red Sea. She was on a voyage from the River Tees to Bombay, India. Whilst aground, she was attacked and plundered by Arab craft. She was refloated and towed in to Aden, Aden Colony by a Dutch steamship, arriving on 3 February.
Rose	United Kingdom	The steamship foundered off Öland, Sweden with the loss of all seventeen crew. She was on a voyage from Copenhagen, Denmark to Reval, Russia.
Slandia	United States	The schooner was wrecked at "Tonato" on or before 4 January. Her crew were rescued.
Southern Belle	United States	The ship was driven ashore at Cape Henry. She was on a voyage from Genoa, Italy to Baltimore, Maryland. She was later refloated.
Tobasco	Denmark	The barque was abandoned at sea before 25 January. Her crew were rescued. She was on a voyage from London to Baltimore.
Vision	Norway	The barque was abandoned in the Atlantic Ocean. She broke up on 13 February at 50°48′N 12°51′W.
Welcome Home	United Kingdom	The coble was wrecked on Heligoland.
Yesso	China	The steamship was damaged by an onboard explosion at Hong Kong. Twelve people were killed and 64 were injured.
