= Joyce Country =

Cultural region in the west of Ireland

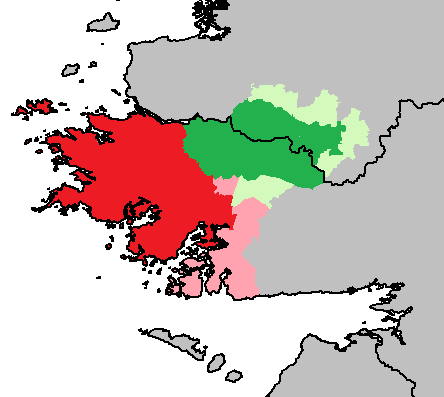
Joyce Country highlighted in green, and Connemara highlighted in red

Joyce Country (Irish: Dúiche Sheoigheach) is a cultural region in counties Galway and Mayo in Ireland. It is sometimes called Partry, after the former tribal territory of the Partraige, which it largely matches. Part of it falls within the Connacht Gaeltacht. Joyce Country lies on the shores of Lough Mask and Lough Corrib, and includes the Partry Mountains. It is a rural area that includes small settlements such as Clonbur, Cong, Cornamona and Toormakeady. It borders Connemara, to its south and west.

== Joyce family ==
One of the first of the family ("Seoighe" in Gaelic) recorded in Connacht was Thomas Joy, who established a minor Hiberno-Norman lordship in northern Iar Connacht. His territory was the barony of Ross, contiguous to Killary Harbour and extending from Cong river to the river. The Joyce family became completely Gaelicised, ruled over their followers like the Chiefs of an Irish clan, and assimilated into the local Gaelic culture.

== Statistics ==
Area	Population	Daily Irish Speakers
An Fhairche	890	19% (175)
Conga	493	40% (201)
An Chorr	158	30% (48)
Leitir Breacáin	31	12% (4)
An Ros	105	60% (64)
An Uilinn	91	31% (29)
Mairíos	128	12% (16)
Binn an Choire	116	14% (17)
TOTAL	2,012	554

== See also ==
County Galway

- Galway City Gaeltacht
- Gaeltacht Cois Fharraige
- Conamara Theas
- Aran Islands

County Donegal

- Gaoith Dhobhair
- Na Rosa
- Cloch Cheann Fhaola
- Gaeltacht an Láir

County Kerry

- Gaeltacht Corca Dhuibhne

County Mayo

- Gaeltacht Iorrais agus Acaill

County Sligo

- Referred to as Yeats Country

== Books ==
- Hardiman, James, History of Galway, 1820
- Gillespie and Moran, eds., Galway: History and Society, Geography Publications, 1996. ISBN 0-906602-75-0
- Martyn, Adrian, The Tribes of Galway:1124–1642, Galway, 2016. ISBN 978-0-9955025-0-5
