= County Galway =

County in Ireland

Coordinates: 53°20′N 9°00′W

County Galway Contae na Gaillimhe
- County
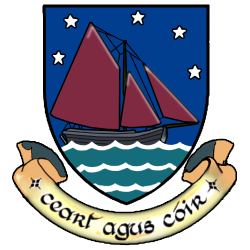
- Coat of arms
- Nickname: The Tribesmen
- Motto: Irish: Ceart agus Cóir
- Anthem: The Fields of Athenry (unofficial)
- Interactive map of County Galway
- Country: Ireland
- Province: Connacht
- Region: Northern and Western
- Established: c. 1569
- County town: Galway

Government
  - Local authorities: County Council and City Council
  - Dáil constituency: Galway East; Galway West; Roscommon–Galway
  - EP constituency: Midlands–North-West

Area
  - Total: 6,151 km^{2} (2,375 sq mi)
  - Rank: 2nd
- Highest elevation (Benbaun): 729 m (2,392 ft)

Population (2022)
  - Total: 276,451
  - Rank: 5th
  - Density: 44.94/km^{2} (116.4/sq mi)
- Time zone: UTC±0 (WET)
  - Summer (DST): UTC+1 (IST)
- Eircode routing keys: F31, H53, H54, H62, H65, H71, H91 (primarily)
- Telephone area codes: 090, 091, 093, 099 (primarily)
- ISO 3166 code: IE-G
- Vehicle index mark code: G
- Website: www.galway.ie www.galwaycity.ie

County Galway (/ˈɡɔːlweɪ/ GAWL-way; Irish: Contae na Gaillimhe) is a county in Ireland. It is in the Northern and Western Region, taking up the south of the province of Connacht. The county population was 276,451 at the 2022 census.

There are several Irish-speaking areas in the west of the county. The traditional county includes the city of Galway, but the city and county are separate local government areas, administered by the local authorities of Galway City Council in the urban area and Galway County Council in the rest of the county.

== History ==
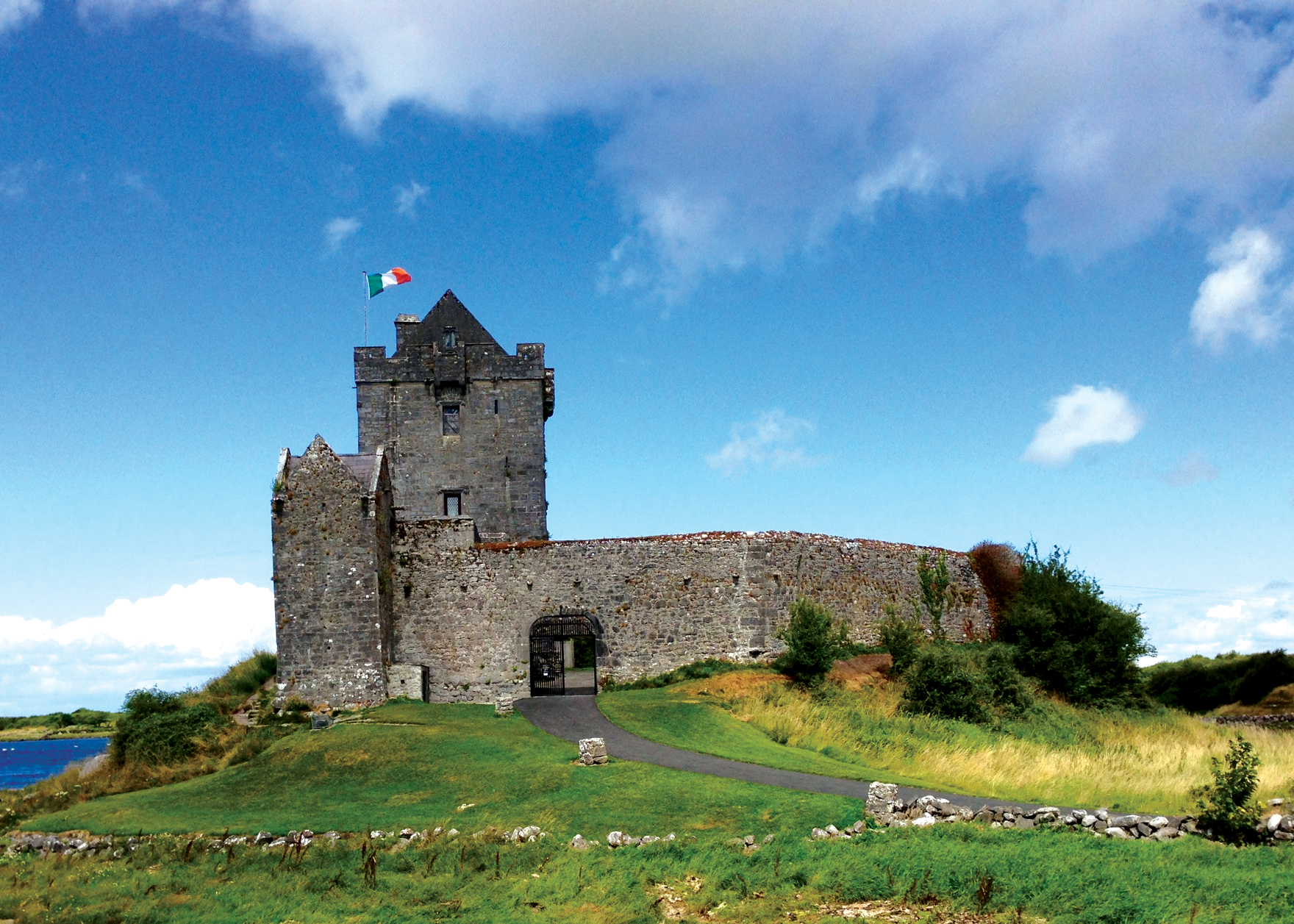
Dunguaire Castle, Kinvara, built c. 1520

The first inhabitants in the Galway area arrived around the 5th millennium BC. Shell middens indicate the existence of people as early as 5000 BC.

The county originally comprised several kingdoms and territories which predate the formation of the county. These kingdoms included Aidhne, Uí Maine, Maigh Seóla, Conmhaicne Mara, Soghain and Máenmag. County Galway became an official entity around 1569 AD. The region known as Connemara retains a distinct identity within the county, though its boundaries are unclear, and it may account for as much as one third, or as little as 20%, of the county.

The county includes a number of inhabited islands, such as the Aran Islands (Irish: Oileáin Árann) and Inishbofin (Irish: Inis Bó Fine).

With the arrival of Christianity many monasteries were built in the county. Monasteries kept written records of events in the area and of its people. These were followed by a number of law-tracts, genealogies, annals and miscellaneous accounts. Extant manuscripts containing references to Galway include:

- Crichaireacht cinedach nduchasa Muintiri Murchada
- Annals of Lough Cé
- Annals of Connacht
- Triallam timcheall na Fodla
- Leabhar Adhamh Ó Cianáin
- Leabhar Ua Maine
- Corporation Book of Galway
- The Book of the Burkes
- Annals of the Four Masters
- Leabhar na nGenealach
- Cuimre na nGenealach
- Obituary Book of the Franciscan monastery at Galway
- Annals of the Poor Clares
- Dominican Annal of Athenry
- Ogygia: A Chronological Account of Irish Events
- West or Iar-Connacht
- The Lynch Manuscript

Historical population
Year	Pop.	±%
1600	19,706	—
1610	14,233	−27.8%
1653	18,209	+27.9%
1659	33,390	+83.4%
1668	45,678	+36.8%
1672	55,700	+21.9%
1680	58,950	+5.8%
1690	63,711	+8.1%
1700	65,112	+2.2%
1710	67,888	+4.3%
1720	70,345	+3.6%
1725	71,798	+2.1%
1735	73,470	+2.3%
1745	71,997	−2.0%
1755	68,955	−4.2%
1765	79,883	+15.8%
1771	81,225	+1.7%
1775	87,226	+7.4%
1781	94,666	+8.5%
1788	101,557	+7.3%
1790	116,774	+15.0%
1801	123,445	+5.7%
1811	145,333	+17.7%
1813	142,808	−1.7%
1816	155,297	+8.7%
1821	169,503	+9.1%
1831	204,691	+20.8%
1841	440,198	+115.1%
1851	321,684	−26.9%
1861	271,478	−15.6%
1871	248,458	−8.5%
1881	242,005	−2.6%
1891	214,712	−11.3%
1901	192,549	−10.3%
1911	182,224	−5.4%
1926	169,366	−7.1%
1936	168,198	−0.7%
1946	165,201	−1.8%
1951	160,204	−3.0%
1956	155,553	−2.9%
1961	149,887	−3.6%
1966	148,340	−1.0%
1971	149,223	+0.6%
1979	167,838	+12.5%
1981	172,018	+2.5%
1986	178,552	+3.8%
1991	180,364	+1.0%
1996	188,854	+4.7%
2002	209,077	+10.7%
2006	231,670	+10.8%
2011	250,541	+8.1%
2016	258,058	+3.0%
2022	276,451	+7.1%

== Irish language ==
Nearly 20% of the population of County Galway live in areas classed as Gaeltachts (Irish-speaking districts). County Galway is home to the largest Gaeltacht Irish-speaking region in Ireland. There are over 48,000 people living within this region, which extends from Galway city westwards through Connemara. The region consists of the following Irish-speaking areas: Galway City Gaeltacht (parts of the city), Gaeltacht Cois Fharraige, Conamara Theas, Aran Islands, and Duiche Sheoigheach (a part of the northern Galway region known as "Joyce Country" and Maam Valley).

All schools within the Gaeltacht use the Irish language for classroom instruction. There is also a third-level constituent college of NUIG called Acadamh na hOllscolaíochta Gaeilge in Carraroe and Carna. Clifden is the largest town in the region. Galway City is also home to Ireland's only Irish-language theatre, Taibhdhearc na Gaillimhe. There is a strong Irish-language media presence in this area too, which boasts the radio station Raidió na Gaeltachta and Foinse newspaper in Carraroe and national TV station TG4 in Baile na hAbhann. The Aran Islands are also part of the Galway Gaeltacht.

According to Census 2016, 84,249 people in County Galway claimed they could speak Irish. According to Census 2011, the Galway city and county Gaeltacht has a population of 48,907, of which 30,978 said they could speak Irish; 23,788 classed themselves as native Irish speakers, while 7,190 speak Irish daily only within the classroom. There are 3,006 attending the ten Gaelscoil (Irish language primary schools) and three Gaelcholáiste (Irish language secondary schools) outside the Galway Gaeltacht. According to the Irish Census 2016, there are 9,445 people in the county who identify themselves as being daily Irish speakers outside the education system.

== Local government and politics ==
The island of Ireland, showing location of County Galway.

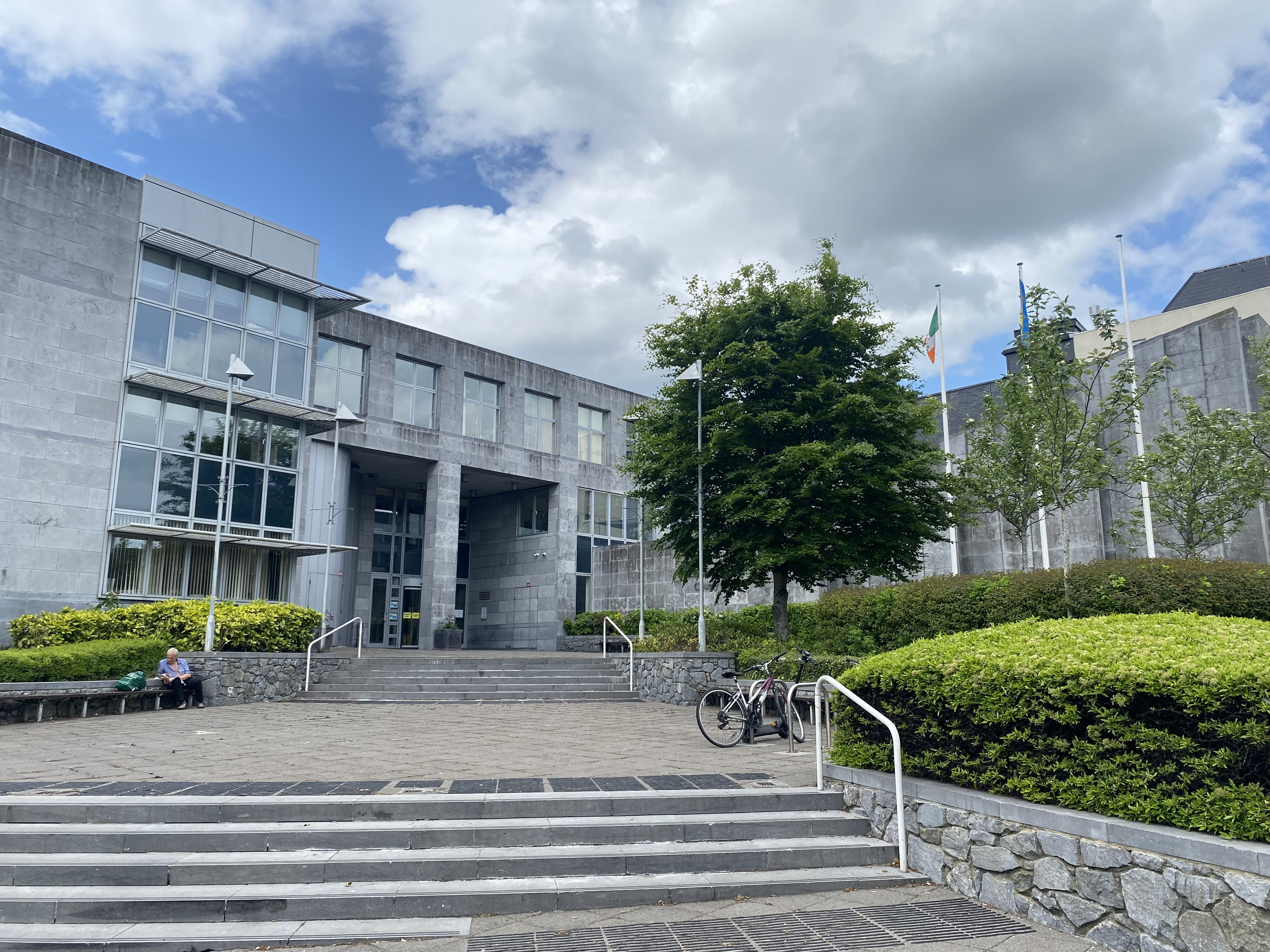
County Hall, Galway

Galway City Council and Galway County Council are the local authorities for the respective local government areas. The local government area of County Galway includes some suburbs of the city not within the city area. Each local authority is responsible for certain local services such as sanitation, planning and development, libraries, the collection of motor taxation, local roads and social housing.

Under the Local Government (Ireland) Act 1898, County Galway was divided into the urban districts of Ballinasloe and Galway, and the rural districts of Ballinasloe No. 1, Clifden, Galway, Glennamaddy, Gort, Loughrea, Mount Bellew, Oughterard, Portumna, and Tuam. Loughrea, within the rural district of Loughrea, and Tuam, within the rural district of Tuam, had town commissioners. The rural districts were abolished in 1925.

In 1937, the urban district of Galway became the borough of Galway, remaining part of County Galway. In 1986, the borough of Galway became the county borough of Galway and ceased to part of County Galway. In 2002, all county boroughs were redefined as cities.

In 2002, the urban district of Ballinasloe and the town commissioners of Loughrea and Tuam became town councils. All town councils in Ireland were abolished in 2014.

As part of the Northern and Western Region, Galway County Council has three representatives and Galway City Council has two representatives on the Northern and Western Regional Assembly.

The county is part of three Dáil constituencies: Galway East (4 seats), Galway West (5 seats) and Roscommon–Galway (3 seats). It is part of the Midlands–North-West constituency for European elections.

== Geography ==
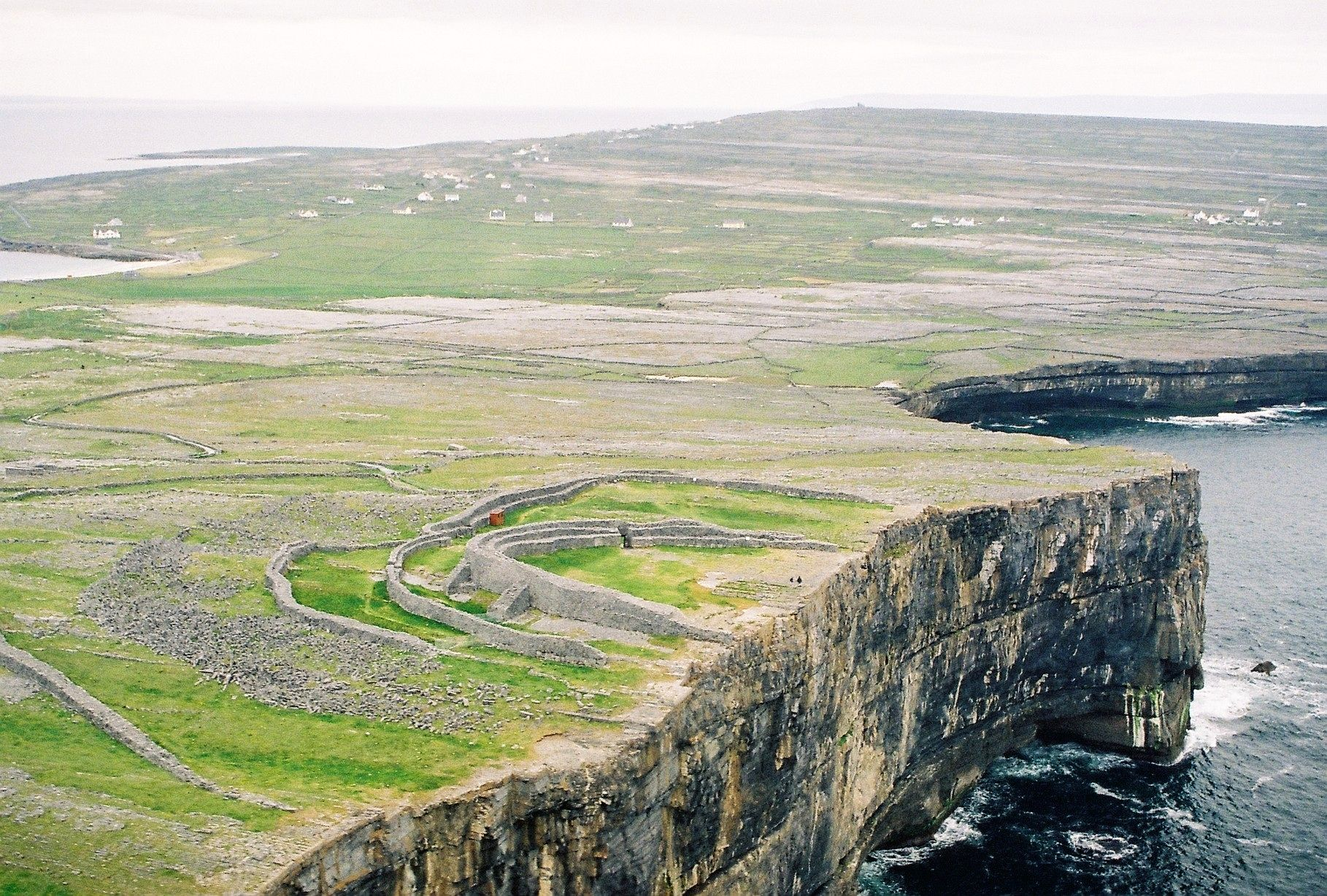
The prehistoric hill fort of Dún Aonghasa, Inishmore Island

County Galway is home to Na Beanna Beola (Twelve Bens) mountain range, Na Sléibhte Mhám Toirc (the Maum Turk mountains), and the low mountains of Sliabh Echtghe (Slieve Aughty). The highest point in the county is one of the Twelve Bens, Benbaun, at 729m.

=== Lakes ===
County Galway is partly home to a number of Ireland's largest lakes including Lough Corrib (the largest lake in the Republic of Ireland), Lough Derg and Lough Mask. The county is also home to a large number of smaller lakes, many of which are in the Connemara region. These include Lough Anaserd, Ardderry Lough, Aughrusbeg Lough, Ballycuirke Lough, Ballynahinch Lake, Lough Bofin, Lough Cutra, Derryclare Lough, Lough Fee, Glendollagh Lough, Lough Glenicmurrin, Lough Inagh, Kylemore Lough, Lettercraffroe Lough, Maumeen Lough, Lough Nafooey, Lough Rea, Ross Lake and Lough Shindilla.

=== Climate ===
The location of County Galway, situated on the west coast of Ireland, allows it to be directly influenced by the Gulf Stream. Temperature extremes are rare and short lived, though inland areas, particularly east of the Corrib, can boast some of the highest recorded temperatures of the summer in the island of Ireland (sometimes exceeding 30 °C); though these temperatures only occur when land warmed east winds sweep the area; the opposite effect can occur in the winter. Overall, however, Galway is influenced mainly by Atlantic airstreams which bring ample rainfall in between the fleeting sunshine. Rainfall occurs in every month of the year, though the late autumn and winter months can be particularly wet as Atlantic cyclonic activity increases and passes over and around the area, and which is why Galway tends to bear the brunt of severe windstorms that can occur between August and March. The county on average receives about 1300mm of rainfall annually, though some areas along the west coast of the county can receive up to 1900mm and beyond. Extreme weather such as blizzards, thunderstorms, flash flooding and hail, though rare, can and do occur, particularly when air masses of continental origin are undercut by more humid and unstable Atlantic flows.

=== Largest settlements in County Galway (2022 Census) ===
1. Galway, 85,910
2. Tuam, 9,647
3. Ballinasloe, 6,597
4. Loughrea, 6,322
5. Oranmore, 5,819
6. Athenry, 4,603
7. Gort, 2,870
8. Bearna, 2,336
9. Moycullen, 2,279
10. Oughterard, 1,846

== Economy ==
According to numbers published by Galway Chamber of Commerce in early 2019, there were then 196 information and communications technology (ICT) organisations in Galway, including IBM, SAP, Oracle and Cisco. There is a number of medical device companies in the area, including Medtronic (with approximately 1,800 employees) and Boston Scientific (2,800 employees).

== Sports ==
Gaelic games are the most popular sport in the county. Galway has had traditional regions in which Gaelic football or hurling is played. For example, in south and eastern County Galway, in places such as Portumna, Gort, Clarinbridge and Athenry, hurling is the dominant sport with successful teams at county and national level. Gaelic football is more prominent throughout much of the rest of the county, with most of the county players being from the Tuam area, Oughterard, Moycullen or parts of Galway city. Corofin, a village and parish in County Galway, their local Gaelic football club, Corofin GAA, have won five All-Ireland Senior Club Football Championship. Caltra GAA and Salthill–Knocknacarra GAA each won a championship, in 2004 and 2006 respectively. The former is based in the village of Caltra, while the latter represents the parishes of Salthill and Knocknacarra in Galway city.

Galway United FC competes in the League of Ireland Premier Division and plays home games in Eamonn Deacy Park.

Connacht Rugby, which competes in the United Rugby Championship, is based in the Sportsgrounds in Galway city. The two main amateur rugby clubs in the county are Galway Corinthians RFC and Galwegians RFC which compete in the All-Ireland League.

County Galway is home to several basketball clubs, including Super League teams University of Galway Maree and Moycullen Basketball Club.

Athletics is also a popular sport in Galway. Athletics clubs in the county include: Galway City Harriers, Craughwell Athletic Club, Athenry A.C, Tuam A.C, and Loughrea A.C.

== Notable people ==
- Joe Canning (born 1988), hurler
- Davy Carton (born 1959), member of The Saw Doctors
- Aaron Connolly (Irish footballer) (born 2000), professional footballer
- Nicola Coughlan (born 1987), actress
- Seán William McLoughlin (born 1990), YouTuber
- Mike Denver (born 1980), country singer
- Maura Derrane (born 1970), journalist and TV presenter
- Pádraic Joyce (born 1977), Gaelic footballer
- Dolores Keane (born 1953), folk singer
- Seán Keane (singer) (born 1961), folk singer
- Leo Moran (born 1964), member of The Saw Doctors
- Brendan Murray (born 1996), singer
- Tomás Ó Reaftaraigh (fl. 1899), Irish scribe
- Gráinne Seoige (born 1973), journalist
- Síle Seoige (born 1979), TV presenter
- John Conness (born 1821), passed bill to make Yosemite National Park

== See also ==
- Connacht Irish
- Galway GAA
- List of monastic houses in Ireland (County Galway)
- Joyce Country
- Lord Lieutenant of Galway
- High Sheriff of County Galway
- High Sheriff of Galway Town
- Western Railway Corridor
- Wild Atlantic Way

== Select bibliography ==
- Conor McNamara, 'War and Revolution in the West of Ireland, Galway 1913–22' (Irish Academic Press, 2019).
- History of Galway, James Hardiman, 1820
- Education in the Diocese of Kilmachduagh in the nineteenth century, Sr. Mary de Lourdes Fahy, Convent of Mercy, Gort, 1972
- "On the Corporation Books of Galway", Trench, W.F. & Lawson, T.D., Journal of the Galway Archaeological and Historical Society Vol. 1, 1900–1901, no. 2.
- "The Lurgan canoe", Costello, T.B, JGAHS Vol. 2, 1902, no. 1.
- Blake Family Records, vol. 1, Martin J. Blake.
- "Portrait of Sir Valentine Blake of Menlough, 3rd Baronet (1608–1652)", anon, JGAHS Vol. 3, 1903–1904, no. 3.
- "Will of Geoffrey French of Galway, A.D. 1528", Martin J. Blake, JGAHS Vol. 4, 1905 –1906, no. 4.
- "A De Burgo silver chalice, A.D. 1494: with notes on the family of Bourke of Turlough, Co. Mayo; drawing & text."JGAHS Vol. 5, 1907–1908, no. 4.
- Old Galway, Maureen Donovan-O'Sullivan, 1942.
- "The Anglo-Normans in Co. Galway: the process of colonization", Patrick Holland, JGAHS Vol. 41, 1987–88.
- Galway: History and Society, ed. Gerard Moran and Raymond Gillespie, Geography Publications, Dublin, 1996, ISBN 0-906602-75-0

(selections below)

  - "The Topography of Medieval and Early Modern Galway City";
  - "From Warlords to Landlords: Political and Social Change in Galway 1540–1640";
  - "Religion and the Laity in Early Modern Galway";
  - "The Transfer of Power: Galway 1642–1703";
  - "The Politics of Protestant ascendency: County Galway 1650–1832";
  - "Landlords and Land Usage in Eighteenth Century Galway";
  - "The Galway Tribes as Landowners and Gentry
  - "The Response of the Poor Law to the Great Famine in County Galway
  - "The Encumbered Estates Court and Galway Property 1849–58
  - "Bishop John MacEvilly and the Catholic Church in Late Nineteenth Century Galway
  - "Minor Famines and Relief in Galway, 1815–1925"
  - "From Connacht to North America: State Aided Emigration from County Galway in the 1880s"
  - "Trade Unionism in County Galway, 1898–1914"
  - "Scríobhaithe Lámhscribhínni Gaeilge I nGallimh"
  - "The Galway Gaeltacht, 1926–81: a Sociolinguistic Study of Continuity and Change"
- A town tormented by the sea: Galway 1790–1914, John Cunningham, 2004.
- The Ploughman on the Pound Note, Eugene Duggan, 2004.
- Land and Revolution" – Nationalist Politics in the West of Ireland 1891 – 1921, Fergus Campbell, 2005.
- "The de Berminghams, Barons of Athenry", Paul Mohr, JGAHS Vol. 63, 2011.
- Clár Amhrán Mhaigh Cuilinn, Ciarán Ó Con Cheanainn, 2011.
- He Who Dared and Died" – The Life and Death of an SAS Original, Sergeant Chris O'Dowd MM, Gearóid O'Dowd, 2011
- The case of the Craughwell Prisoners during the Land War in Co. Galway, 1879–85, Pat Finnegan, 2012
- Loughrea, that den of infamy: The Land War in County Galway, 1879–82, Pat Finnegan, 2014.
- East Galway agrarian agitation and the burning of Ballydugan House, 1922, Anne O'Riordan, 2015.
- Rebellion in Galway – Easter Rising 1916 Kevin Jordan, 2016.
- The Tribes of Galway: 1124–1642, Adrian Martyn, 2016.
- He was Galway:Máirtín Mór McDonogh, 1860–1934, Jackie Uí Chionna, 2016.
