= Tomás Ó Reaftaraigh =

Irish scribe

Tomás Ó Reaftaraigh, Irish scribe, fl. 1899.

Ó Reaftaraigh is an obscure scribe, a native of County Galway. Very few of his works seem to survive. Among those that have were transcriptions of poems by the brothers Marcus and Peatsaí Ó Callanáin. These were later incorporated into Filíocht na gCeannanáin, published in 1967 by Seán Ó Ceallaigh.

His surname, though spelled differently, is the same as Antoine Ó Raifteirí. Its original form was Ó Reachtaire, and is mostly found in County Mayo and County Galway, now in the form Raftery.
