= Loch Na Fooey =

- Loch na Fuaiche (Irish)
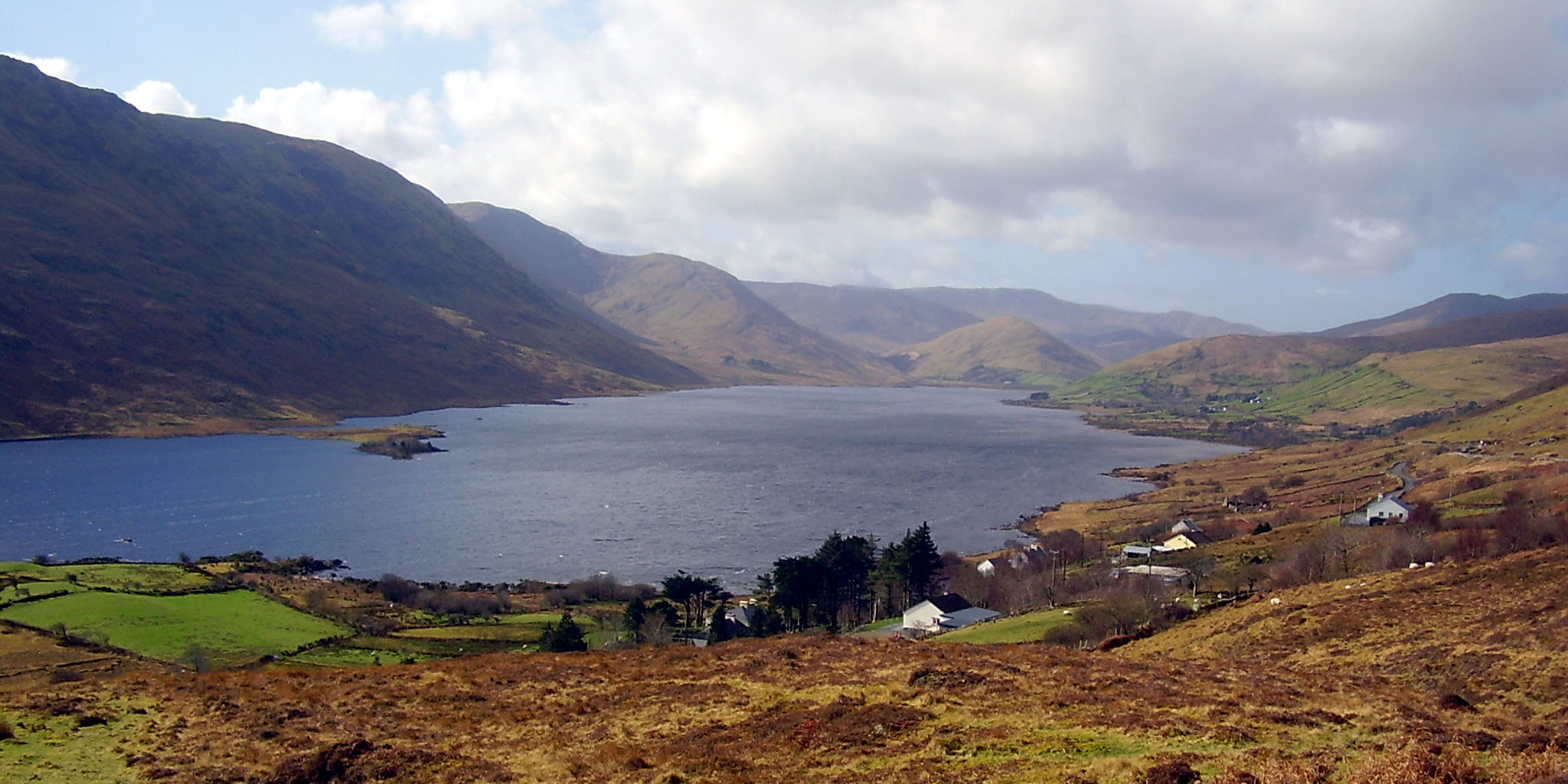
- Viewed from Mayo on the R300

- Location in Ireland
- Location: County Galway
- Coordinates: 53°34′40″N 9°32′53″W
- Type: Glacial lake
- Primary inflows: River Fooey
- Primary outflows: Finny River
- Basin countries: Ireland
- Max. length: 2.5 mi (4.0 km)
- Max. width: 0.5 mi (0.80 km)
- Surface area: 2.48 km^{2} (0.96 sq mi)
- Surface elevation: 25 m (82 ft)
- Islands: Red Island (An tOileán Rua)
- Settlements: Finny, Leenaun

Loch Na Fooey (Irish: Loch na Fuaiche, meaning 'lake of the fissure'), also Loch Nafooey or Lough Nafooey, is a rectangular shaped glacial lake in County Galway, Ireland. Part of the north-eastern shore lies along the border to County Mayo. The closest village is Finny, County Mayo with the County Galway village of Leenaun approximately 11 km distant.

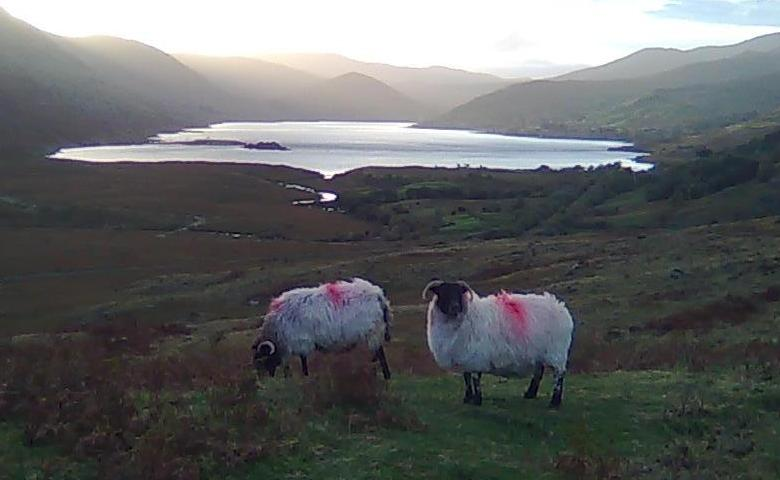
Lough Nafooey

At approximately 2.5 miles long and 0.5 miles wide, Loch Na Fooey is set in a steep-sided valley, surrounded by the mountains of Galway to the south and Mayo's Partry Mountains to the north. Several rivers feed the lake, including the River Fooey (Irish: Abhainn na Fuaiche), which rises from the Devil's Mother mountain and enters the lake at the western shore. The Finny River, rising from the south-east of the lake, drains into the southwest part of Lough Mask. Also, many mountain streams flow into the lake. The lake has a small sandy shore on its western end.

There are several extinct volcanoes in locations like Armagh, Dublin, Offaly, and the Loch na Foeey in Galway. They are not believed to be dangerous. The area around Loch Na Fooey is known as the site of the ancient "Finny volcano" (490 million years ago). Most of the volcanic activity occurred during the Ordovician, when Western and Central Europe separated from the rest of Europe and what is now Asia. As recently as 60 million years ago, Europe and America were still converging. There was no Atlantic Ocean. All over Ireland, there remains geological evidence of the volcanic age. Many of its hills are remains of extinct volcanoes. Hundreds of millions of years ago, the Iapetus Ocean began to shrink as mountains formed in parts of the ocean, before North America separated from Europe. These formations still exist in North America, Greenland, Norway, and Ireland. The volcano's landform is now gone, but some of the volcanic rocks are preserved in the area, including pillow lavas, and breccia.

There is a small funnel-shaped island close to the south-eastern shore known as Red Island (An tOileán Rua).

The waters hold a range of fish including wild brown trout and pike.

The locality has some walks for both experienced hill walkers and others. In folklore, the lake is said to be home to An Capall Uisce or the Water Horse, a mythical Celtic creature.

== See also ==
- List of loughs in Ireland
- List of volcanoes in the Republic of Ireland
