= Ballyness =

Ballyness Baile an Easa
- Townland
- Location in Ireland
- Country: Ireland
- Province: Ulster
- County: County Donegal

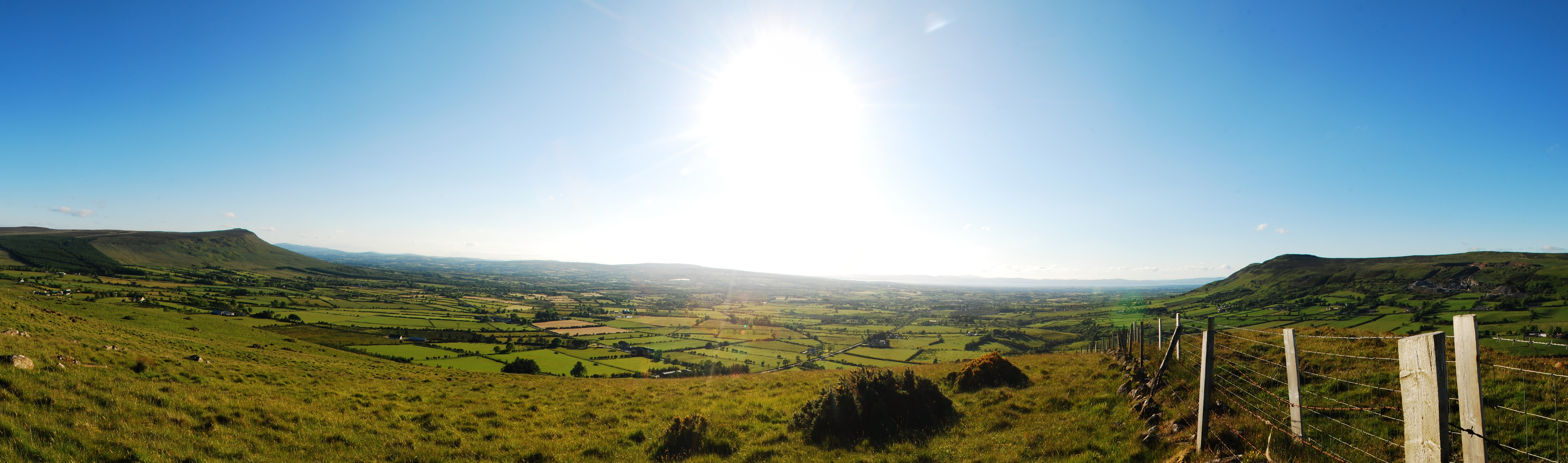
Panorama of Ballyness

Ballyness (Irish: Baile an Easa, meaning 'townland of the waterfall') is a townland in the parish of Cloughaneely in the north west of County Donegal. Its Irish name is Baile an Easa meaning town of the waterfall. It is known for its salmon fishing at the bawann pool.

== Oyster farming ==
In 2019, 14 licenses were granted by the Department of Agriculture, Food and the Marine to begin oyster farming at Ballyness Bay. Over 5,000 people signed a petition organised by local campaign group Save Ballyness Bay, to protest the decision.
