= Carraroe =

Village in Connemara, County Galway, Ireland

Carraroe An Cheathrú Rua
- Village
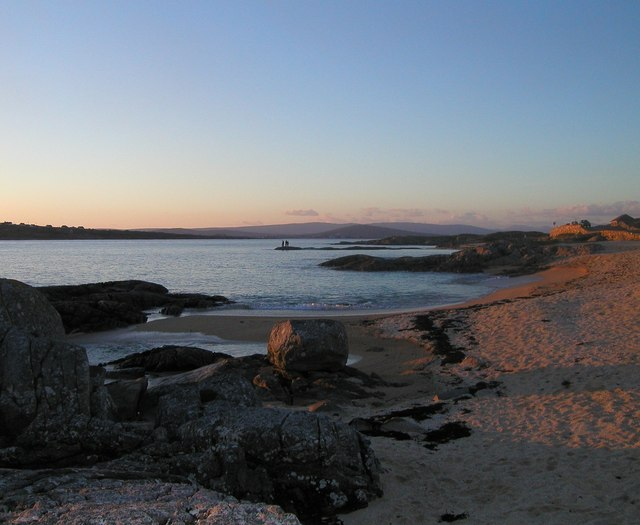

- Location in Ireland
- Coordinates: 53°15′56″N 9°35′01″W
- Country: Ireland
- Province: Connacht
- County: County Galway

Population (2022)
  - Total: 725
- Irish Grid Reference: L943250

Carraroe (in Irish, and officially, an Cheathrú Rua Irish pronunciation: [ənˠ ˌça(h)ɾˠuː ˈɾˠuə], meaning 'the red quarter') is a village in Connemara, the coastal Irish-speaking region (Gaeltacht) of County Galway, Ireland. It is known for its traditional fishing boats, the Galway Hookers. Its population is widely dispersed over the Carraroe peninsula between Cuan an Fhir Mhóir (Greatman's Bay) and Cuan Chasla (Casla Bay). Carraroe has an unusual beach, Trá an Dóilín, a biogenic gravel beach made of coralline algae known as "maerl".

== Galway hookers ==
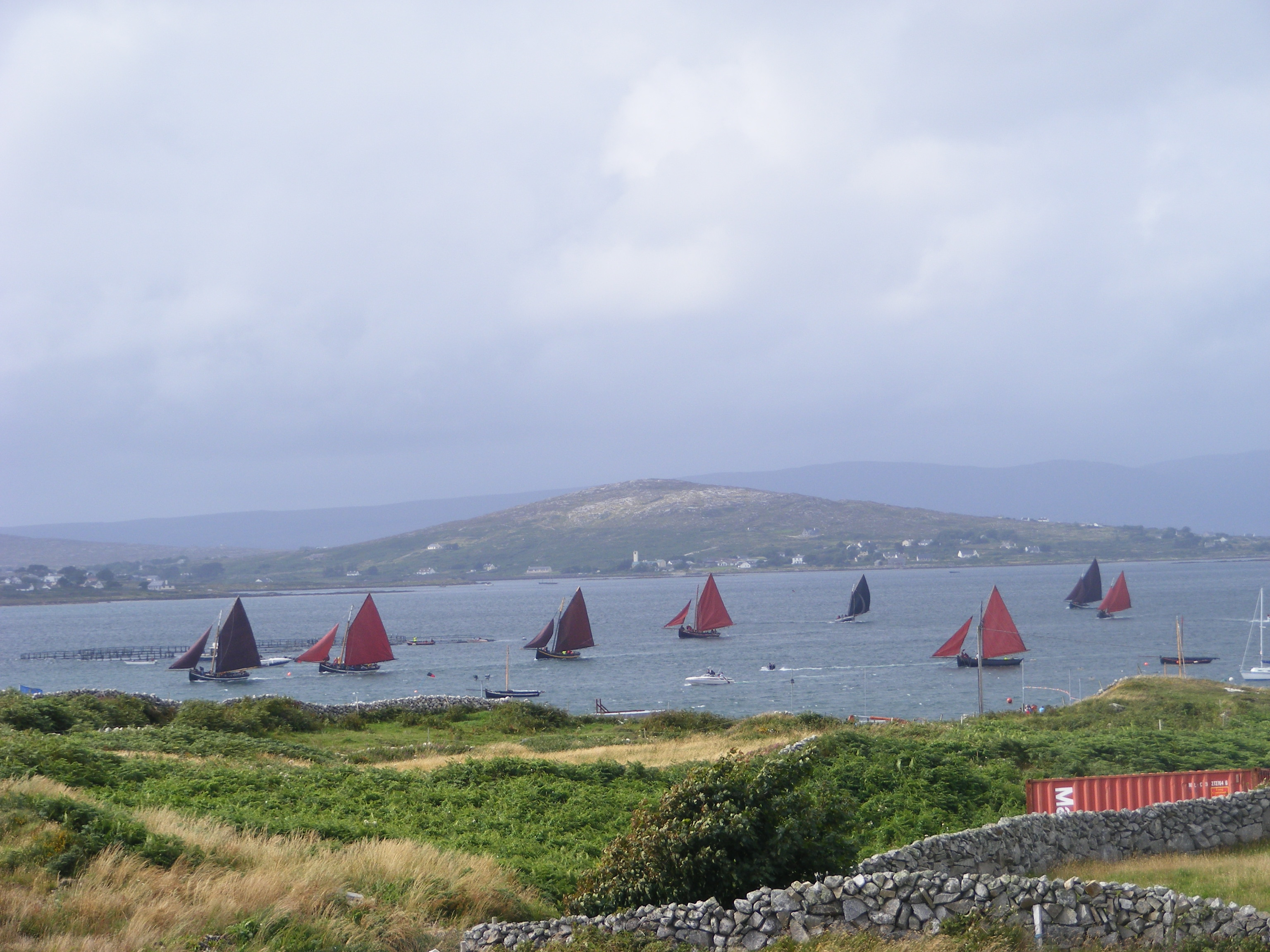
Galway hookers in Greatmans Bay

Galway Hookers are a distinctive form of native Irish boat, and Carraroe hosts an annual regatta of these vessels. As of 2006 this event, which is named Féile an Dóilín after the area's "coral strand", was the largest ever regatta of Galway hookers. The main boats are the larger Báid Mhóra (big boats) and Leathbháid (half-boats), which in earlier times were used for hauling turf from the peat bogs in Connemara to the Aran Islands and The Burren of County Clare, where peat is absent. The smaller boats are the Gleoiteoga, which were traditionally used for fishing. These boats can be found at Sruthán Pier, which is the main pier in Carraroe and in the Caladh Thadhg area.

The main activity of these boats is racing, and there are several regattas along the Connemara coast. Currach racing is held on Loch an Mhuilinn, the lake close to the village. Every year at the festival of Cruinniú na mBád, a flotilla of traditional Connemara boats race across Galway Bay from Carraroe to Kinvara.

== Irish language ==
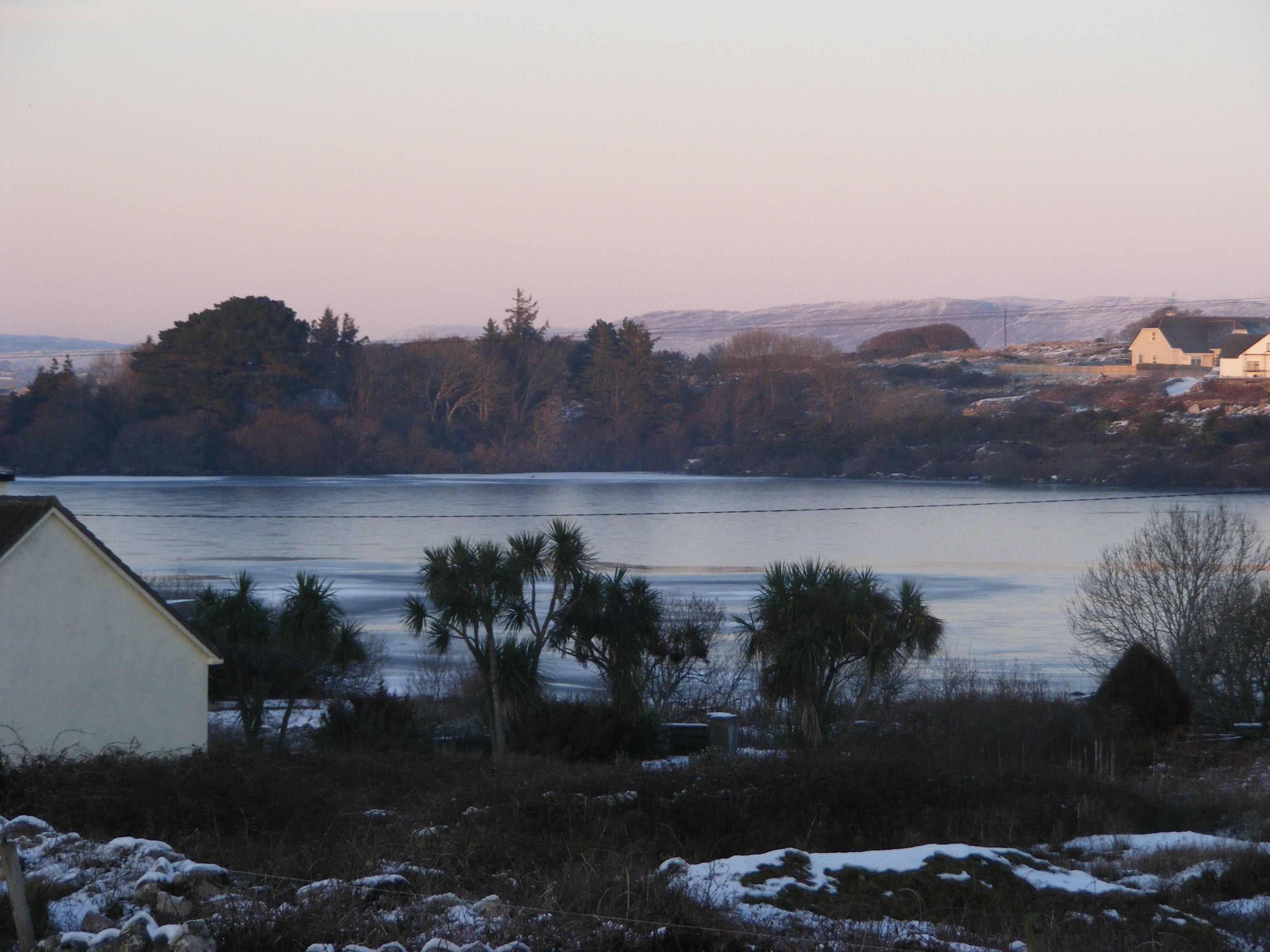
Caladh Thadhg lake frozen 25 December 2010

Irish (specifically the Connacht dialect) is the main spoken language of Carraroe, the settlement being the most populous Irish-speaking village in the Connemara Gaeltacht.

In the 2022 census, Carraroe was a town with one of the highest percentages of daily Irish speakers in Ireland, with 69 percent stating that they spoke it daily. Under the Gaeltacht Act 2012, the Gaeltacht was redefined into 26 Language Planning Areas. Of these, Carraroe area recorded the third-largest proportion of daily Irish speakers in Ireland in the 2022 census, at 90 percent.

There are two summer schools that teach Irish to English-speaking secondary-school students from all over Ireland. The Carraroe area is also a centre for Irish-language media, and the former national Irish-language newspaper Foinse had its head office in the village. The Irish-language radio station, RTÉ Raidió na Gaeltachta, is in nearby Casla, and the Irish-language television station, TG4, is based at Baile na hAbhann, a few kilometres east. Roman Catholic church services are in Irish only. All school lessons are conducted in Irish.

== Beach ==
Trá an Dóilín is a Blue Flag beach near the village which is noted for its fine "coral". Though the beach is known in English as "Coral Strand", it is actually made of coralline algae known as maerl. This biogenic gravel beach is rare and of great conservation importance.

== Education ==
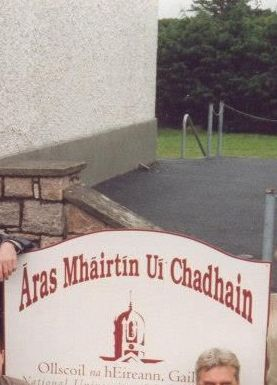
Áras Mháirtín Uí Chadhain

Áras Mháirtín Uí Chadhain (Máirtín Ó Cadhain House) is one of the Gaeltacht centres of Oifig na Gaeilge Labhartha (the Department of Spoken Irish) of the National University of Ireland, Galway. The facility opened in 1977. The centre is named in honour of Máirtín Ó Cadhain, author of Cré na Cille ('Graveyard Clay').

== Sport ==
Páirc an Chathanaigh is a community-owned sports ground in the village. It is the home ground of both Gaelic football club CLG An Cheathrú Rua and An Ghaeltacht RFC rugby union club. It also hosted Galway United F.C.'s 1986–87 UEFA Cup soccer match against FC Groningen when Terryland Park failed to meet UEFA standards.

Local soccer club C.S. Mac Dara competes in the Galway & District League. Connemara Isles Golf Club is a nine-hole course in nearby Lettermore.

== Transport ==
Carraroe is served by Bus Éireann route 424 from Galway.

== Popular culture ==
The village is mentioned in the lyrics of the Waterboys' 1993 hit "Glastonbury Song", which refers to several Irish and British sites associated with ancient Celtic ritual:

We came down from the hill of dreams
Bernadette, mother earth and you and me
Through Carraroe, down the wildwood side.

The town gives its name to the traditional tune "Carraroe Jig". The jig has been recorded by several artists, including Patrick Street, Mick Moloney and The Corrs.

Carraroe is the home of the fictional Nuala Anne McGrail, heroine of novelist Andrew Greeley's "Irish" series which began with Irish Gold in 1994.

== Notable people ==
- Charles Lamb (1893–1964), artist, lived in Carraroe from 1921 until his death
- Tomás Mac Eoin, sean-nós singer, lives in An Cheathrú Rua

== See also ==
- List of towns and villages in Ireland
