= Foinse =

Irish language newspaper

- Type: Weekly newspaper
- Format: Tabloid and online
- Owner: Pádraig Ó Céidigh
- Founded: October 1996; 29 years ago
- Language: Irish
- Headquarters: Carraroe, County Galway, Ireland
- Circulation: 195,000
- Website: www.foinse.ie

Foinse (pronounced [ˈfˠɪn̠ʲʃə]; Irish for "Source") was an Irish-language newspaper in Ireland. It was first published October 1996 and had both print and online editions until September 2013 when its publisher, Móinéar Teo, announced that it would become online only from that month. The Foinse website continued to be active until 2015 when it was shut down.

== History ==
Foinse was first published in October 1996 as a weekly Saturday newspaper. It was published in Carraroe, County Galway, and printed in Tralee, County Kerry. The newspaper closed temporarily in June 2009 because of falling revenue. The owner, Pádraig Ó Céidigh, announced that he and the funding body, Foras na Gaeilge, could not agree on the terms of a new contract. Publishing resumed in 2009, however, with a new distribution model which was independent of Foras na Gaeilge. This consisted of free distribution with the Irish Independent every Wednesday. In February 2011, the paper had a reported readership of 195,000 in the Republic of Ireland.

== Content ==
Foinse's content included stories about the Gaeltacht and the Irish language, coverage of current affairs, sport, travel, business and education, reviews, editorial pieces and sections for Leaving Certificate students (Foinse sa Rang) and children (Foinse Óg). Among those who wrote for Foinse were Dáithí Ó Sé, Evanne Ní Chuilinn, Micheál Ó Muircheartaigh, Mícheál Ó Conaola and Bláthnaid Ní Dhonnchadha. The paper also had a page for adult learners in conjunction with Conradh na Gaeilge and carried TG4 listings each week.

== See also ==
- List of Celtic-language media
