= Cois Fharraige =

Irish-speaking region of Ireland

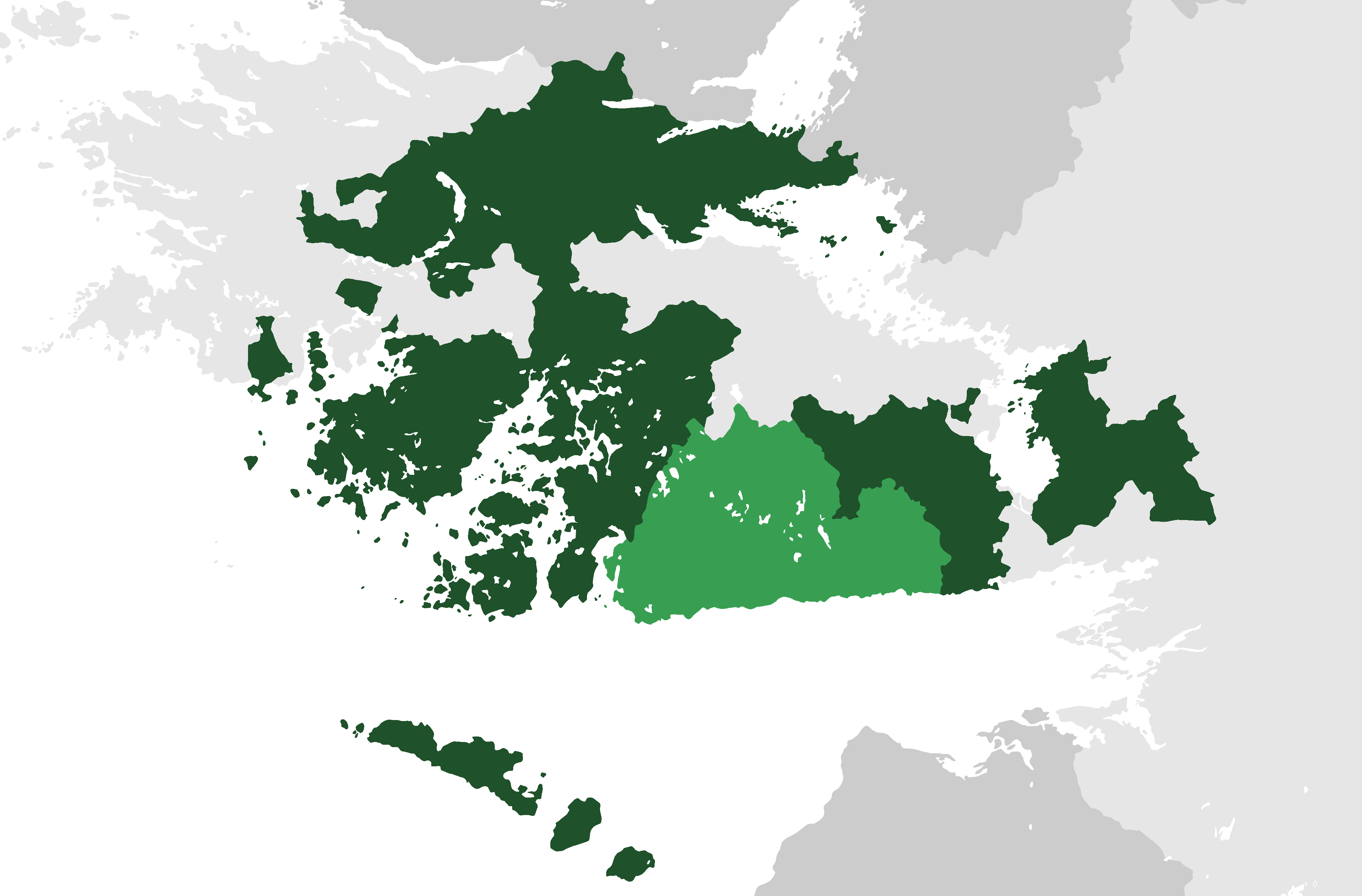
Cois Fharraige (light green) within the greater Gaeltacht of County Galway (dark green).

Cois Fharraige (pronounced [kɔʃ ˈaɾˠəɟə]; lit. 'beside the sea' or 'seaside'), previously spelled Cois Fhairrge, is a coastal area west of Galway city, where the Irish language is the predominant language (a Gaeltacht). It stretches from Na Forbacha, Bearna, An Spidéal to Indreabhán. There are between 8,000 and 9,000 people living in this area.

The area is most often included within the definition of Connemara, but some say that Connemara does not come as far south as the Galway Bay coast. The Cois Fharraige accent is different from the Conamara Theas (south Connemara) accent – Conamara Theas was defined at a time when Gaeltacht Cois Farraige was not considered part of Connemara.

The highest percentage of daily Irish speakers (daily outside educational system + daily within and outside educational system) is in An Coill Rua (Killroe West) - 66.03% (175/265), according to the 2022 Irish census.

The proportion of Irish speakers ranges from 24% in Bearna to 84% in Cill Chuimín.

The headquarters for the Gaeltacht development authority Údarás na Gaeltachta is located in Na Forbacha.

Bearna, a Gaeltacht village, is regarded by some as a suburb of Galway City due to its proximity, but there are still Irish speakers in its hinterland, and it still retains its Gaeltacht status. An Spidéal is majority Irish speaking and is the tourism centre of the region. Near Indreabhán is Baile na hAbhann, home of the Irish language TV station TG4.

Electoral division	Population	Irish speakers
Sliabh an Aonaigh	615	33% (204)
Bearna	2,367	24% (586)
Na Forbacha	1,211	39% (476)
An Spidéal	1,196	67% (813)
Cill Aithnín	806	78% (632)
Sailearna	1,241	82% (1,028)
Cill Chuimín	1,249	84% (1,054)
Total	8,685	55% (4,793)
