= Galway City Gaeltacht =

The Achréidh na Gaillimhe (English: Galway City Gaeltacht) comprises five electoral divisions: Bearna, Baile an Bhriotaigh, An Caisleán Gearr, Mionlach and Cnoc na Cathrach. Due to its proximity to Ireland's biggest Gaeltacht, Galway city has always been important for the language movement and many Irish speakers settling or moving to Galway. According to the 2016 census, 31,583 people (41%) in Galway City said they could speak Irish, but only 2,344 people (3%) spoke it daily.

Electoral Division	Population	Irish Speakers
Bearna	5,508	17% (943)
Mionlach	4,651	10% (456)
An Caisleán Gearr	1,000	11% (110)
Baile an Bhriotaigh	60	15% (9)
Cnoc na Cathrach	18	0% (0)
Total	11,237	13% (1,518)

== Surrounding areas ==
There are approximately 9,000 people living in small villages across the city's hinterland with an estimated 1,500 daily Irish speakers. These villages are Lisín an Bhealaigh, Leacach Beag, Baile Chláir, Ceathrú an Bhrúnaigh, An Carn Mór and Baile an Teampaill.

Electoral Division	Population	Irish Speakers
Tulaigh Mhic Aodháin	1,003	21% (213)
Maigh Cuilinn	1,323	22% (289)
Eanach Dhúin	1,473	11% (110)
Baile Chláir	1,536	13% (194)
Ceathrú an Bhrúnaigh	723	19% (136)
Baile an Teampaill	186	9% (16)
Leacach Beag	138	11% (15)
An Carn Mór	1,887	17% (316)
Sliabh an Aonaigh	615	33% (204)
Total	8,884	17% (1,493)
