= List of Special Areas of Conservation in the Republic of Ireland =

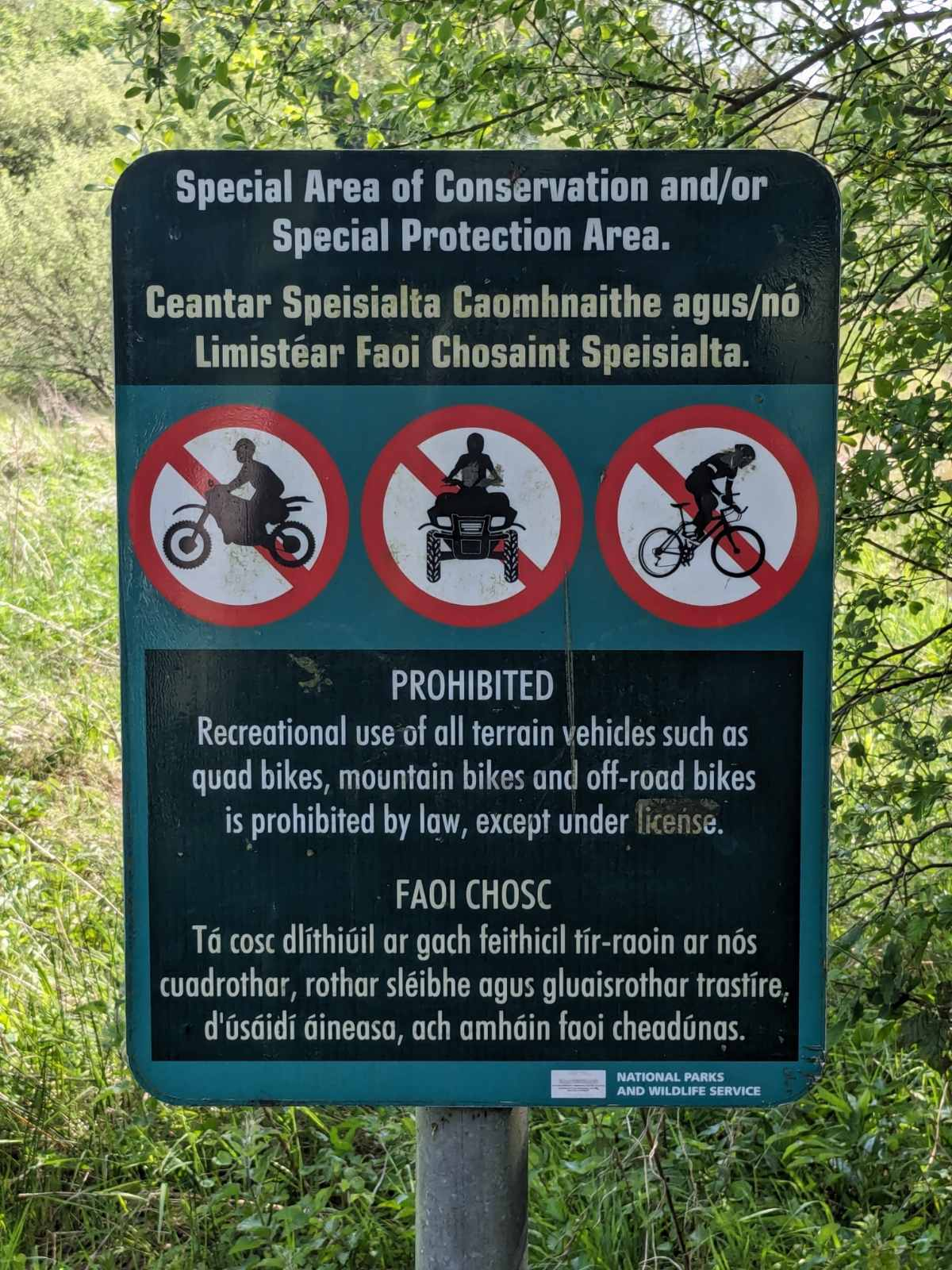
Special Area of Conservation photo

The following is a list of Special Areas of Conservation in the Republic of Ireland, as listed by the National Parks and Wildlife Service (NPWS). Since 2020, the NPWS has operated under the aegis of the Department of Housing, Local Government and Heritage. The Special Areas of Conservation are part of the Natura 2000 network of sites within the European Union for special flora or fauna.

== Connacht ==
Name	Photo	County	Land area (hectares)	EU Code
Ardgraigue Bog		Galway	183.46	IE0002356
Ardrahan Grassland		Galway	200.99	IE0002244
Aughrim (Aghrane) Bog		Galway	110.33	IE0002200
Aughrusbeg Machair and Lake		Galway	422.25	IE0001228
Ballinduff Turlough		Galway	60.61	IE0002295
Ballygar (Aghrane) Bog		Galway	27.98	IE0002199
Ballymaglancy Cave, Cong		Galway	9.3	IE0000474
Barnahallia Lough		Galway	43.86	IE0002118
Barroughter Bog		Galway	173.95	IE0000231
Caherglassaun Turlough		Galway	165.58	IE0000238
Cahermore Turlough		Galway	64.07	IE0002294
Camderry Bog		Galway	280.6	IE0002347
Carrowbaun, Newhall and Ballylee Turloughs		Galway	105.62	IE0002293
Carrownagappul Bog		Galway	485.66	IE0001242
Castletaylor Complex		Galway	143.43	IE0000242
Cloonmoylan Bog		Galway	554.19	IE0000248
Connemara Bog Complex		Galway	49197.33	IE0002034
Coolcam Turlough		Galway	136.76	IE0000218
Coole-Garryland Complex	Coole Park	Galway	1119.93	IE0000252
Corliskea/Trien/Cloonfelliv Bog		Galway, Roscommon	724.91	IE0002110
Cregduff Lough		Galway	71.84	IE0001251
Cregg House Stables, Crusheen		Galway	0.02	IE0002317
Croaghill Turlough		Galway	47.35	IE0000255
Curraghlehanagh Bog		Galway	277.97	IE0002350
Derrycrag Wood Nature Reserve		Galway	118.37	IE0000261
Derrinlough (Cloonkeenleananode) Bog		Galway	61.1	IE0002197
Dog's Bay	Dog's Bay	Galway	146.93	IE0001257
Drummin Wood		Galway	84.84	IE0002181
East Burren Complex		Galway	18800.66	IE0001926
Galway Bay		Galway	14,402.77	IE0000268
Glenloughaun Esker		Galway	5.7	IE0002213
Gortacarnaun Wood		Galway	111.49	IE0002180
Gortnandarragh Limestone Pavement		Galway	347.08	IE0001271
Inishbofin and Inishshark	Inishshark	Galway	2794.06	IE0000278
Inisheer Island	Inisheer	Galway	552.29	IE0001275
Inishmaan Island	Inishmaan	Galway	801.86	IE0000212
Inishmore Island	Inishmore	Galway	14493.61	IE0000213
Kilkieran Bay and Islands		Galway	21397.86	IE0002111
Kilsallagh Bog		Galway	279.61	IE0000285
Kiltartan Cave (Coole)		Galway	0.01	IE0000286
Kiltiernan Turlough		Galway	52.41	IE0001285
Kingstown Bay		Galway	79.89	IE0002265
Levally Lough		Galway	57.97	IE0000295
Lisnageeragh Bog and Ballinastack Turlough		Galway	440	IE0000296
Loughatorick South Bog		Galway	887.96	IE0000308
Lough Carra/Mask Complex	Lough Carra	Galway, Mayo	13509.77	IE0001774
Lough Corrib	Lough Corrib	Galway, Mayo, Roscommon	25193.2	IE0000297
Lough Coy		Galway	77.4	IE0002117
Lough Cutra	Lough Cultra	Galway	658.5	IE0000299
Lough Derg, North-East Shore		Galway	3652.8	IE0002241
Lough Fingall Complex		Galway	606.78	IE0000606
Lough Lurgeen Bog/Glenamaddy Turlough	Glenamaddy Turlough	Galway	1161.62	IE0000301
Lough Nageeron		Galway	19.65	IE0002119
Lough Rea	Lough Rea	Galway	364.6	IE0000304
Maumturk Mountains	Maumturk Mountains	Galway	13465.97	IE0002008
Monivea Bog		Galway	286.56	IE0002352
Murvey Machair		Galway	80.13	IE0002129
Omey Island Machair		Galway	228.86	IE0001309
Peterswell Turlough		Galway	245.47	IE0000318
Pollnaknockaun Wood Nature Reserve		Galway	80.53	IE0000319
Rahasane Turlough		Galway	351.66	IE0000322
Shannon Callows		Galway, Roscommon	5853.94	IE0000216
Rosroe Bog		Galway	261.93	IE0000324
Ross Lake and Woods	Ross Lake	Galway	323.06	IE0001312
Rosturra Wood		Galway	38.24	IE0001313
Rusheenduff Lough		Galway	48.74	IE0001311
Shankill West Bog		Galway	136.34	IE0000326
Slyne Head Islands		Galway	2355.13	IE0000328
Slyne Head Peninsula		Galway	4026.46	IE0002074
Sonnagh Bog		Galway	464.72	IE0001913
Termon Lough		Galway	211.7	IE0001321
The Twelve Bens/Garraun Complex	Twelve Bens	Galway	16163.23	IE0002031
Tully Lough	Tully Lough	Galway	142.22	IE0002130
Tully Mountain	Tully Mountain	Galway	478.91	IE0000330
Williamstown Turloughs		Galway	232.64	IE0002296
West Connacht Coast		Galway, Mayo	65945.58	IE0002998
Arroo Mountain		Leitrim	3966.19	IE0001403
Ben Bulben, Gleniff and Glenade Complex	Ben Bulben	Leitrim, Sligo	5981.24	IE0000623
Boleybrack Mountain		Leitrim, Cavan	4242.32	IE0002032
Bunduff Lough and Machair/Trawalua/Mullaghmore	Bunduff Lough	Leitrim, Sligo	4387.18	IE0000625
Cuilcagh - Anierin Uplands	Cuilcagh	Leitrim	9735.53	IE0000584
Glenade Lough	Glenade Lough	Leitrim	115.02	IE0001919
Lough Gill	Lough Gill	Leitrim, Sligo	3318.67	IE0001976
Lough Melvin	Lough Melvin	Leitrim, Donegal	2268.87	IE0000428
Achill Head	Achill Head	Mayo	6892.36	IE0002268
Ardkill Turlough		Mayo	25.53	IE0000461
Balla Turlough		Mayo	49.08	IE0000463
Ballinafad		Mayo	0.15	IE0002081
Bellacorick Bog Complex		Mayo	9519.75	IE0001922
Bellacorick Iron Flush		Mayo	22.86	IE0000466
Bellacragher Saltmarsh		Mayo	17.44	IE0002005
Brackloon Woods	Brackloon Woods	Mayo	80.2	IE0000471
Broadhaven Bay	Broadhaven Bay	Mayo	9071.38	IE0000472
Carrowkeel Turlough		Mayo	40.97	IE0000475
Carrowmore Lake Complex	Carrowmore Lake	Mayo	3646.78	IE0000476
Clare Island Cliffs		Mayo	409.99	IE0002243
Clew Bay Complex		Mayo	11981.94	IE0001482
Cloonakillina Lough		Mayo	66.93	IE0001899
Cloughmoyne		Mayo	96.72	IE0000479
Clyard Kettle-Holes		Mayo	126.46	IE0000480
Corraun Plateau		Mayo	3895.13	IE0000485
Croaghaun/Slievemore	Croghaun Cliffs	Mayo	3293.81	IE0001955
Cross Lough (Killadoon)	Cross Lough	Mayo	56.67	IE0000484
Doocastle Turlough		Mayo, Sligo	76.67	IE0000492
Doogort Machair/Lough Doo		Mayo	187.87	IE0001497
Duvillaun Islands		Mayo	539.36	IE0000495
Erris Head	Erris Head	Mayo	850.97	IE0001501
Flughany Bog		Mayo, Sligo	231.03	IE0000497
Glenamoy Bog Complex	Glenamoy Bog Complex	Mayo	13057.21	IE0000500
Greaghans Turlough		Mayo	43.71	IE0000503
Inishkea Islands	Inishkea South Island	Mayo	1239.38	IE0000507
Keel Machair/Menaun Cliffs	Menaun Cliffs	Mayo	1667.49	IE0001513
Kildun Souterrain		Mayo	0.65	IE0002320
Kilglassan/Caheravoostia Turlough Complex		Mayo	111.63	IE0000504
Killala Bay/Moy Estuary	Killala Bay	Mayo, Sligo	2180.9	IE0000458
Lackan Saltmarsh and Kilcummin Head		Mayo	538.01	IE0000516
Lough Cahasy, Lough Baun and Roonah Lough		Mayo	300.58	IE0001529
Lough Dahybaun		Mayo	76.1	IE0002177
Lough Gall Bog		Mayo	362.58	IE0000522
Lough Hoe Bog		Mayo, Sligo	3214.04	IE0000633
Mocorha Lough		Mayo	65.98	IE0001536
Moore Hall (Lough Carra)		Mayo	0.08	IE0000527
Mullet/Blacksod Bay Complex	Blacksod Bay	Mayo	14023.02	IE0000470
Mweelrea/Sheeffry/Erriff Complex	Mweelrea	Mayo	20974.45	IE0001932
Newport River	Newport River	Mayo	1402.52	IE0002144
Oldhead Wood	Oldhead Wood	Mayo	85.29	IE0000532
Owenduff/Nephin Complex	Nephin	Mayo	27052.05	IE0000534
Ox Mountains Bogs		Mayo, Sligo	10565.78	IE0002006
River Moy	River Moy	Mayo, Roscommon, Sligo	15389.86	IE0002298
Shrule Turlough		Mayo	170.52	IE0000525
Skealoghan Turlough		Mayo	40.02	IE0000541
Slieve Fyagh Bog	Slieve Fyagh and forestry	Mayo	2375.90	IE0000542
Towerhill House		Mayo	60.71	IE0002179
Urlaur Lakes	Urlaur Lakes	Mayo, Roscommon	265.78	IE0001571
Annaghmore Lough		Roscommon	249.9	IE0001626
Ballinturly Turlough		Roscommon	151.69	IE0000588
Ballynamona Bog and Corkip Lough	Ballynamona Bog	Roscommon	244.67	IE0002339
Bellanagare Bog		Roscommon	1207.08	IE0000592
Callow Bog		Roscommon	617.65	IE0000595
Carrowbehy/Caher Bog		Roscommon	345.66	IE0000597
Castlesampson Esker		Roscommon	144.2	IE0001625
Cloonchambers Bog		Roscommon	348.06	IE0000600
Cloonshanville Bog		Roscommon	225.81	IE0000614
Coolcam Turlough		Roscommon	136.76	IE0000218
Corbo Bog		Roscommon	206.67	IE0002349
Derrinea Bog		Roscommon	89.18	IE0000604
Drumalough Bog		Roscommon	278.77	IE0002338
Errit Lough	Erit Lough, a hard water lake and SAC	Roscommon	84.59	IE0000607
Four Roads Turlough		Roscommon	100.18	IE0001637
Killeglan Grassland		Roscommon	60.91	IE0002214
Lisduff Turlough		Roscommon	69.69	IE0000609
Lough Arrow	Lough Arrow	Roscommon, Sligo	1454.26	IE0001673
Lough Croan Turlough		Roscommon	155.62	IE0000610
Lough Forbes Complex		Roscommon	1333.82	IE0001818
Lough Funshinagh	Lough Funshinagh	Roscommon	430.52	IE0000611
Lough Ree		Roscommon	14365.03	IE0000440
Mullygollan Turlough		Roscommon	35.89	IE0000612
Tullaghanrock Bog		Roscommon	102.83	IE0002354
Ballysadare Bay	Ballysadare Bay	Sligo	2144.55	IE0000622
Bricklieve Mountains and Keishcorran	Bricklieve Mountains	Sligo	1692.09	IE0001656
Cummeen Strand/Drumcliff Bay (Sligo Bay)	Drumcliff Bay	Sligo	4917.01	IE0000627
Knockalongy and Knockachree Cliffs		Sligo	115.55	IE0001669
Lough Nabrickkeagh Bog		Sligo	271.82	IE0000634
Streedagh Point Dunes	Streedagh Point Dunes	Sligo	632.83	IE0001680
Templehouse and Cloonacleigha Loughs	Templehouse Lough	Sligo	492.64	IE0000636
Turloughmore		Sligo	74.17	IE0000637
Union Wood		Sligo	60.83	IE0000638
Unshin River		Sligo	892.01	IE0001898

== Leinster ==
Name	Photo	County	Land area (hectares)	EU Code
Blackstairs Mountains	Blackstairs Mountains	Carlow, Wexford	5046.85	IE0000770
River Barrow and River Nore	River Barrow	Carlow, Kildare, Kilkenny, Laois, Offaly, Wexford	12367.76	IE0002162
Slaney River Valley	Slaney River	Carlow, Wexford, Wicklow	6017.81	IE0000781
Baldoyle Bay	Baldoyle Bay	Dublin	538.7	IE0000199
Ballyman Glen		Dublin	23.53	IE0000713
Dublin Bay (North)	North Dublin Bay	Dublin	1474.35	IE0000206
Dublin Bay (South)	South Dublin Bay	Dublin	741.8	IE0000210
Glenasmole Valley	South Dublin Bay	Dublin	149.23	IE0001209
Howth Head	Howth Head	Dublin	374.72	IE0000202
Ireland's Eye	Ireland's Eye	Dublin	40.34	IE0002193
Knocksink Wood	Knocksink Wood	Dublin, Wicklow	87.89	IE0000725
Lambay Island	Lambay Island	Dublin	404.19	IE0000204
Malahide Estuary	Malahide Estuary	Dublin	788	IE0000205
Rogerstown Estuary		Dublin	537.76	IE0000208
Ballynafagh Bog		Kildare	155.23	IE0000391
Ballynafagh Lake	Ballynafagh Lake, County Kildare	Kildare	45.49	IE0001387
Red Bog, Kildare		Kildare	4.1	IE0000397
Rye Water Valley / Carton	Rye Water	Kildare, Meath	70.48	IE0001398
Mouds Bog		Kildare	590.94	IE0002331
Pollardstown Fen	Pollardstown Fen	Kildare	226.83	IE0000396
Hugginstown Fen		Kilkenny	63.9	IE0000404
The Loughans		Kilkenny	40.45	IE0000407
Cullahill Mountain		Kilkenny	54.72	IE0000831
Spahill and Clomantagh Hill		Kilkenny	146.47	IE0000849
Galmoy Fen		Kilkenny	25.22	IE0001858
Lower River Suir	River Suir	Kilkenny	7096.91	IE0002137
Thomastown Quarry		Kilkenny	3.88	IE0002252
Ballyprior Grassland		Laois	44.18	IE0002256
Clonaslee Eskers and Derry Bog		Laois, Offaly	278.67	IE0000859
Coolrain Bog		Laois	145.89	IE0002332
Lisbigney Bog		Laois	35.59	IE0000869
Mountmellick SAC		Laois	2.03	IE0002141
Slieve Bloom Mountains		Laois, Offaly	4877.08	IE0000412
Knockacoller Bog		Laois	129.27	IE0002333
Ardagullion Bog		Longford	116.44	IE0002341
Brown Bog		Longford	73.62	IE0002346
Clooneen Bog		Longford	214.93	IE0002348
Derragh Bog		Longford	37.62	IE0002201
Fortwilliam Turlough		Longford	50.69	IE0000448
Lough Forbes Complex		Longford	1333.82	IE0001818
Lough Ree	Lough Ree	Longford, Westmeath	14365.03	IE0000440
Mount Jessop Bog		Longford	71.92	IE0002202
Boyne Coast and Estuary		Louth, Meath	629.24	IE0001957
Carlingford Mountain	Carlingford Mountain	Louth	3099.87	IE0000453
Carlingford Shore		Louth	524.39	IE0002306
Clogher Head	Clogher Head	Louth	23.74	IE0001459
Dundalk Bay	Dundalk Bay	Louth	5234.05	IE0000455
River Boyne and River Blackwater		Louth, Meath, Westmeath	2317.87	IE0002299
Girley (Drewstown) Bog		Meath	32.27	IE0002203
Killyconny Bog (Cloghbally)		Meath	185.02	IE0000006
Lough Bane and Lough Glass	Lough Bane	Meath, Westmeath	203.42	IE0002120
Moneybeg and Clareisland Bogs		Meath, Westmeath	364.17	IE0002340
Mount Hevey Bog		Meath, Westmeath	473.91	IE0002342
White Lough, Ben Loughs and Lough Doo		Meath, Westmeath	116.28	IE0001810
All Saints Bog and Esker		Offaly	365.81	IE0000566
Charleville Wood	Charleville Wood	Offaly	377.35	IE0000571
Clara Bog		Offaly	836.18	IE0000572
Ferbane Bog		Offaly	151.9	IE0000575
Fin Lough		Offaly	73.98	IE0000576
Island Fen		Offaly	12.02	IE0002236
Lisduff Fen		Offaly	30.83	IE0002147
Mongan Bog		Offaly	206.51	IE0000580
Moyclare Bog		Offaly	129.95	IE0000581
Pilgrim's Road Esker		Offaly	69.73	IE0001776
Raheenmore Bog		Offaly	203.7	IE0000582
Ridge Road, SW of Rapemills		Offaly	6.24	IE0000919
Shannon Callows		Offaly, Westmeath	5853.94	IE0000216
Sharavogue Bog		Offaly	236.39	IE0000585
The Long Derries, Edenderry		Offaly	30.37	IE0000925
Ballymore Fen		Westmeath	42.71	IE0002313
Carn Park Bog		Westmeath	247.15	IE0002336
Crosswood Bog		Westmeath	206.52	IE0002337
Garriskil Bog		Westmeath	351.29	IE0000679
Lough Ennell	Lough Ennell	Westmeath	1719.63	IE0000685
Lough Lene	Lough Lene	Westmeath	490.74	IE0002121
Lough Owel	Lough Owel	Westmeath	1121.45	IE0000688
Scragh Bog		Westmeath	23.85	IE0000692
Split Hills and Long Hill Esker		Westmeath	75.23	IE0001831
Wooddown Bog		Westmeath	49.86	IE0002205
Ballyteige Burrow	Ballyteige Burrow	Wexford	703.09	IE0000696
Bannow Bay	Bannow Bay	Wexford	1325.12	IE0000697
Blackwater Bank		Wexford	12401.45	IE0002953
Cahore Polders and Dunes	Cahore Polders and Dunes	Wexford	264.76	IE0000700
Carnsore Point	Carnsore Point	Wexford	8736.19	IE0002269
Hook Head	Hook Head	Wexford	17006.27	IE0000764
Kilmuckridge-Tinnaberna Sandhills	Kilmuckridge-Tinnaberna Sandhills	Wexford	64.56	IE0001741
Kilpatrick Sandhills		Wexford	39.69	IE0001742
Lady's Island Lake	Lady's Island Lake	Wexford	507	IE0000704
Long Bank		Wexford	3370.87	IE0002161
Raven Point Nature Reserve		Wexford	594.26	IE0000710
Saltee Islands	Saltee Islands	Wexford	15822.26	IE0000707
Screen Hills		Wexford	139.42	IE0000708
Tacumshin Lake		Wexford	558.57	IE0000709
Ballyman Glen		Wicklow	23.53	IE0000713
Bray Head	Bray Head	Wicklow	263.39	IE0000714
Buckroney-Brittas Dunes and Fen		Wicklow	320.65	IE0000729
Carriggower Bog		Wicklow	84.3	IE0000716
Vale of Clara (Rathdrum Wood)	Vale of Clara	Wicklow	378.25	IE0000733
Deputy's Pass Nature Reserve		Wicklow	47.88	IE0000717
Glen of the Downs	Glen of the Downs	Wicklow	74.45	IE0000719
Holdenstown Bog		Wicklow	4.05	IE0001757
Magherabeg Dunes		Wicklow	74.61	IE0001766
The Murrough Wetlands	The Murrough Wetlands	Wicklow	602.7	IE0002249
Wicklow Mountains	Wicklow Mountains	Wicklow, Dublin	32931.38	IE0002122
Wicklow Reef	Wicklow Reef	Wicklow	1532.56	IE0002274

== Munster ==
Name	Photo	County	Land area (hectares)	EU Code
Ballyallia Lake		Clare	180.17	IE0000014
Ballycullinan Lake		Clare	191.21	IE0000016
Ballycullinan, Old Domestic Building		Clare	5.74	IE0002246
Ballyogan Lough		Clare	379.73	IE0000019
Ballyteigue	Ballyteigue	Clare	6.43	IE0000994
Ballyvaughan Turlough		Clare	12.86	IE0000996
Black Head-Poulsallagh Complex		Clare	7801.99	IE0000020
Carrowmore Dunes	Carrowmore Dunes	Clare	451.64	IE0002250
Carrowmore Point to Spanish Point and Islands		Clare	4236.47	IE0001021
Danes Hole, Poulnalecka		Clare	38.43	IE0000030
Dromore Woods and Loughs		Clare	877.04	IE0000032
East Burren Complex		Clare	18800.66	IE0001926
Galway Bay Complex		Clare	14402.77	IE0000268
Glendree Bog		Clare	339.92	IE0001912
Glenomra Wood		Clare	50.27	IE0001013
Inagh River Estuary		Clare	392.45	IE0000036
Kilkee Reefs		Clare	2877.95	IE0002264
Kilkishen House		Clare	0.44	IE0002319
Knockanira House		Clare	0.02	IE0002318
Loughatorick South Bog		Clare	887.96	IE0000308
Lough Gash Turlough		Clare	25.58	IE0000051
Lower River Shannon		Clare, Cork, Kerry, Limerick, Tipperary	68300.01	IE0002165
Moneen Mountain	Moneen Mountainside	Clare	6104.82	IE0000054
Moyree River System		Clare	477.67	IE0000057
Newgrove House		Clare	47.41	IE0002157
Newhall and Edenvale Complex		Clare	136.91	IE0002091
Old Domestic Building, Keevagh		Clare	0.01	IE0002010
Old Domestic Buildings, Rylane		Clare	13.90	IE0002314
Old Farm Buildings, Ballymacrogan		Clare	0.16	IE0002245
Pouladatig Cave		Clare	3.36	IE0000037
Pollagoona Bog		Clare	55.03	IE0002126
Poulnagordon Cave (Quin)		Clare	0.05	IE0000064
Ratty River Cave		Clare	0.72	IE0002316
Slieve Bernagh Bog		Clare	1973.97	IE0002312
Termon Lough		Clare	211.7	IE0001321
Toonagh Estate		Clare	5.41	IE0002247
Tullaher Lough and Bog		Clare	468.98	IE0002343
Ballymacoda (Clonpriest and Pillmore)		Cork	494.82	IE0000077
Barley Cove to Ballyrisode Point		Cork	796.92	IE0001040
Bandon River	Bandon River	Cork	321.12	IE0002171
Ballyhoura Mountains	Ballyhoura Mountains	Cork, Limerick	746.7	IE0002036
Blackwater River (Cork/Waterford)	Blackwater River	Cork, Kerry, Limerick, Tipperary, Waterford	10145.32	IE0002170
Caha Mountains	Caha Mountains	Cork, Kerry	6856.12	IE0000093
Carrigeenamronety Hill	Carrigeenamronety peak	Cork, Limerick	94.75	IE0002037
Castletownshend		Cork	17.03	IE0001547
Cleanderry Wood		Cork	61.06	IE0001043
Clonakilty Bay	Clonakilty Bay	Cork	511.91	IE0000091
Courtmacsherry Estuary		Cork	735.11	IE0001230
Derryclogher (Knockboy)		Cork	1712.22	IE0001873
Dunbeacon Shingle		Cork	43.02	IE0002280
The Gearagh		Cork	557.71	IE0000108
Glengarriff Harbour and Woodland	Glengarriff Harbour	Cork	1305.22	IE0000090
Glanmore Bog		Cork, Kerry	1147.78	IE0001879
Great Island Channel	Great Island Channel	Cork	1437.55	IE0001058
Farranamanagh Lough	Farranamanagh Lough	Cork	27.3	IE0002189
Kenmare River	Kenmare River	Cork, Kerry	43267.5	IE0002158
Killarney National Park, MacGillycuddy's Reeks and Caragh River Catchment	Caragh River	Cork, Kerry	76444.99	IE0000365
Kilkeran Lake and Castlefreke Dunes		Cork	96.43	IE0001061
Lough Hyne Nature Reserve and Environs	Lough Hyne	Cork	450.94	IE0000097
Myross Wood		Cork	3.97	IE0001070
Reen Point Shingle		Cork	7.01	IE0002281
Roaringwater Bay and Islands	Roaringwater Bay	Cork	14253.09	IE0000101
Sheep's Head	Sheep's Head	Cork	3133.9	IE0000102
St. Gobnet's Wood		Cork	43.85	IE0000106
Three Castle Head to Mizen Head	Three Castle Head view to Mizen Head	Cork	353	IE0000109
Akeragh, Banna and Barrow Harbour	Barrow Harbour	Kerry	1199.25	IE0000332
Ballinskelligs Bay and Inny Estuary	Ballinskelligs Bay	Kerry	1658.47	IE0000335
Ballyseedy Wood		Kerry	39.49	IE0002112
Blackwater River (Kerry)	Blackwater River (Kerry)	Kerry	5900.18	IE0002173
Blasket Islands	Dunmore Head looking out to the Blasket Islands	Kerry	22715.96	IE0002172
Castlemaine Harbour		Kerry	8683.05	IE0000343
Cloonee and Inchiquin Loughs, Uragh Wood		Kerry	1154.05	IE0001342
Drongawn Lough		Kerry	31.42	IE0002187
Glanlough Woods		Kerry	16.55	IE0002315
Kerry Head Shoal		Kerry	5794.72	IE0002263
Kilgarvan Ice House		Kerry	17.25	IE0000364
Lough Yganavan and Lough Nambrackdarrig	Lough Nambrackdarrig	Kerry	271.60	IE0000370
Magharee Islands	Magharee Islands	Kerry	2270.16	IE0002261
Maulagowna Bog		Kerry	425.89	IE0001881
Moanveanlagh Bog		Kerry	214.63	IE0002351
Mount Brandon		Kerry	14349.07	IE0000375
Mucksna Wood		Kerry	14.07	IE0001371
Mullaghanish Bog		Kerry	70.02	IE0001890
Old Domestic Building, Askive Wood		Kerry	43.43	IE0002098
Old Domestic Building, Curraglass Wood		Kerry	0.03	IE0002041
Old Domestic Building, Dromore Wood		Kerry	123.57	IE0000353
Sheheree (Ardagh) Bog		Kerry	17.07	IE0000382
Slieve Mish Mountains	Baurtregaum, Derrymore Glen	Kerry	9787.49	IE0002185
Tralee Bay and Magharees Peninsula, West to Cloghane	Tralee Bay	Kerry	11627.11	IE0002070
Valencia Harbour/Portmagee Channel	Portmagee Channel	Kerry	2691.84	IE0002262
Askeaton Fen Complex		Limerick	284.29	IE0002279
Barrigone		Limerick	66.33	IE0000432
Clare Glen	Clare Glen	Limerick, Tipperary	21.86	IE0000930
Curraghchase Woods		Limerick	360.17	IE0000174
Galtee Mountains	Galtee Mountains	Limerick, Tipperary	6418.99	IE0000646
Glen Bog		Limerick	27.66	IE0001430
Glenstal Wood		Limerick	6.33	IE0001432
Tory Hill		Limerick	78.15	IE0000439
Anglesey Road		Tipperary	32.92	IE0002125
Arragh More (Derrybreen) Bog		Tipperary	90.58	IE0002207
Ballyduff/Clonfinane Bog		Tipperary	269.45	IE0000641
Bolingbrook Hill		Tipperary	204.51	IE0002124
Keeper Hill	Keeper Hill	Tipperary	413.53	IE0001197
Kilcarren-Firville Bog		Tipperary	676.38	IE0000647
Kilduff, Devilsbit Mountain		Tipperary	133.81	IE0000934
Liskeenan Fen		Tipperary	43.68	IE0001683
Lough Derg, North-East Shore	Lough Derg	Tipperary	3652.80	IE0002241
Lower River Suir		Tipperary, Waterford	7096.91	IE0002137
Moanour Mountain		Tipperary	48.03	IE0002257
Philipston Marsh		Tipperary	3.80	IE0001847
Redwood Bog		Tipperary	554.79	IE0002353
River Barrow and River Nore		Tipperary, Waterford	12367.76	IE0002162
River Shannon Callows		Tipperary	5853.94	IE0000216
Scohaboy (Sopwell) Bog		Tipperary	71.91	IE0002206
Silvermine Mountains	Silvermine Mountains	Tipperary	24.89	IE0000939
Silvermine Mountains West		Tipperary	625.04	IE0002258
Ardmore Head		Waterford	29.59	IE0002123
Comeragh Mountains	Comeragh Mountains	Waterford	6290.43	IE0001952
Glendine Wood		Waterford	19.64	IE0002324
Helvick Head	Helvick Head	Waterford	203.47	IE0000665
Nier Valley Woodlands		Waterford	94.63	IE0000668
Tramore Dunes and Backstrand	Tramore Dunes and Backstrand	Waterford	770.13	IE0000671

== Ulster ==
Name	Photo	County	Land area (hectares)	EU Code
Boleybrack Mountain		Cavan	4242.32	IE0002032
Corratirrim		Cavan	116.99	IE0000979
Cuilcagh - Anierin Uplands	Cuilcagh Mountain Peak	Cavan	9735.53	IE0000584
Killyconny Bog (Cloghbally)		Cavan	185.02	IE0000006
Lough Oughter and Associated Loughs	Lough Oughter	Cavan	4755.86	IE0000007
River Boyne and River Blackwater	River Blackwater	Cavan	2317.87	IE0002299
Aran Island (Donegal) Cliffs	Aran Island	Donegal	542.81	IE0000111
Ballintra		Donegal	47.18	IE0000115
Ballyarr Wood	Ballyarr Wood	Donegal	30.01	IE0000116
Ballyness Bay	Ballyness Bay	Donegal	1235.31	IE0001090
Ballyhoorisky Point to Fanad Head		Donegal	1292.49	IE0001975
Cloghernagore Bog and Glenveagh National Park		Donegal	33445.53	IE0002047
Coolvoy Bog		Donegal	306.55	IE0001107
Croaghonagh Bog		Donegal	248.87	IE0000129
Donegal Bay (Murvagh)	Donegal Bay	Donegal	1810.48	IE0000133
Dunmuckrum Turloughs		Donegal	33.9	IE0002303
Dunragh Loughs/Pettigo Plateau		Donegal	2022.48	IE0001125
Durnesh Lough	Durnesh Lough	Donegal	357.28	IE0000138
Lough Eske and Ardnamona Wood	Lough Eske	Donegal	857.58	IE0000163
Lough Nagreany Dunes		Donegal	221.06	IE0000164
Fawnboy Bog/Lough Nacung	Gweedore	Donegal	1104.93	IE0000140
River Finn	River Finn	Donegal	5498.46	IE0002301
Gannivegil Bog		Donegal	2152.73	IE0000142
Lough Golagh and Breesy Hill		Donegal	798.83	IE0002164
Gweedore Bay and Islands	Gweedore Bay	Donegal	6013.55	IE0001141
Horn Head and Rinclevan		Donegal	2343.32	IE0000147
North Inishowen Coast		Donegal	7066.04	IE0002012
Inishtrahull	Inishtrahull	Donegal	483.11	IE0000154
Kindrum Lough	Kindrum Lough	Donegal	116.06	IE0001151
Leannan River	Leannan River	Donegal	1725.64	IE0002176
Magheradrumman Bog	Towards Magheradrumman	Donegal	997.27	IE0000168
Meenaguse/Ardbane Bog		Donegal	668.24	IE0000172
Meenaguse Scragh		Donegal	627.13	IE0001880
Meentygrannagh Bog		Donegal	529.80	IE0000173
Lough Melvin		Donegal	2268.87	IE0000428
Muckish Mountain	Muckish Mountain	Donegal	1522.15	IE0001179
Mulroy Bay	Mulroy Bay	Donegal	3207.76	IE0002159
Lough Nageage		Donegal	156.77	IE0002135
Lough Nillan Bog (Carrickatlieve)		Donegal	4156.02	IE0000165
Rathlin O'Birne Island	Rathlin O'Birne Island	Donegal	797.72	IE0000181
Rutland Island and Sound	Rutland Island	Donegal	3865.6	IE0002283
Sessiagh Lough	Sessiagh Lough	Donegal	71.6	IE0000185
Sheephaven Bay	Sheephaven Bay	Donegal	1841.19	IE0001190
Slieve League	Slieve League	Donegal	3924.27	IE0000189
Slieve Tooey/Tormore Island/Loughros Beg Bay	Loughros Beg Bay	Donegal	9431.45	IE0000190
Lough Swilly	Lough Swilly	Donegal	9257.68	IE0002287
St. John's Point	St. John's Point	Donegal	1086.35	IE0000191
Tamur Bog		Donegal	1183.62	IE0001992
Termon Strand		Donegal	86.86	IE0001195
Tory Island Coast	Tory Island coast	Donegal	3047.18	IE0002259
Tranarossan and Melmore Lough	Boyeeghter Strand	Donegal	653.35	IE0000194
West Of Ardara/Maas Road		Donegal	6733.42	IE0000197
Kilroosky Lough Cluster		Monaghan	56.81	IE0001786

== Offshore ==
Name	Photo	Land area (hectares)	EU Code
Belgica Mound Province		41090.4	IE0002327
Hempton's Turbot Bank		4492.68	IE0002999
Hovland Mound Province		108655	IE0002328
South-west Porcupine Bank		32929.9	IE0002329
North-west Porcupine Bank		71629.7	IE0002330
Rockabill to Dalkey Island		27285.88	IE0003000
Porcupine Bank Canyon		78110	IE0003001
South East Rockall Bank		148790	IE0003002
Codling Fault Zone		2982.23	IE0003015

== See also ==
- List of Special Protection Areas in the Republic of Ireland
- List of Special Areas of Conservation in Northern Ireland
- List of Special Areas of Conservation in Wales
- List of Special Areas of Conservation in Scotland
- List of Special Areas of Conservation in England

== Sources ==
- Special Areas of Conservation (SAC) dataset from the National Park and Wildlife Service available under CC-BY-SA 4.0 licence
