= Ballyea =

Ballyea may refer to several things in Ireland:

== County Clare ==
- Ballyea, County Clare, a village
- Ballyea GAA, a Gaelic Athletic Association club in the parish of Ballyea/Clarecastle

== County Tipperary ==
- Ballyea North, a townland near Ballina
- Ballyea, Dorrha, a townland in the extreme north of County Tipperary
- Ballyea South, a townland near Ballina
- Ballyea, County Tipperary, a townland in the south of County Tipperary
