= Redwood, County Tipperary =

Barony in County Tipperary, Ireland

Coordinates: 53°07′N 8°06′W

Redwood (Coillte Rua in Irish) is a townland in the historical Barony of Ormond Lower, County Tipperary, Ireland. It is also an electoral district in the Dáil constituency of Offaly having previously been part of the Tipperary North Dáil constituency.

== Location ==
Redwood townland is the most northern townland of Tipperary and therefore of the province of Munster. It lies between the townlands of Ballymacegan and Ballyea with the River Shannon separating it from County Galway.

== Places of note ==
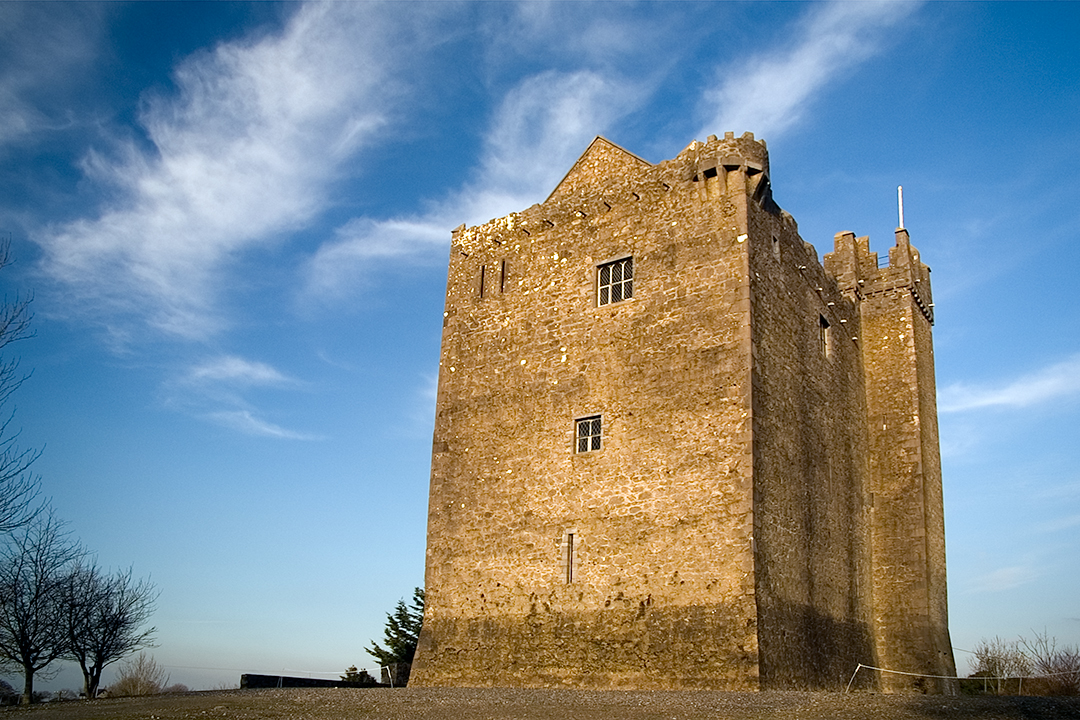
Redwood Castle County Tipperary

Redwood Castle, a restored Norman castle with a Sheela na Gig is a protected structure (ref S329) on the North Tipperary list of protected structures.

Redwood Bog is a degraded raised bog it was acquired from Bord na Móna for conservation purposes and established as a nature reserve. It was established in 1991 and is state owned.

Redwood church is listed as being a building of special architectural and social interest. Built in 1853 it is a small well constructed single cell building built overlooking the Shannon Callows.

St. Ruadhan's Park, the Lorrha-Dorrha GAA grounds are located at Moatfield, Redwood.
