= Killeglan Grassland =

Ecological site in County Roscommon, Ireland

- Féarach Chill Fhiagláin
- Location within Ireland
- Location: County Roscommon, Ireland
- Nearest city: Ballinasloe, County Galway
- Coordinates: 53°25′47″N 8°12′08″W
- Area: 60.91 ha (150.5 acres)
- Established: 2016
- Governing body: National Parks and Wildlife Service

The Killeglan Grassland (Irish: Féarach Chill Fhiagláin) Special Area of Conservation or SAC is a designated Natura 2000 site in south County Roscommon, near the town of Ballinasloe in County Galway, Ireland. Killeglan Grassland is designated as a Special Area of Conservation under the qualifying interest: semi-natural dry grasslands and scrubland facies on calcareous substrates (Festuco-Brometalia) (* important orchid sites).

== Location ==
Killeglan Grassland Special Area of Conservation is located in south County Roscommon, 9.5 km north of the town of Ballinasloe in County Galway, in the townlands of Ballyglass (Dodwell), Breeole and Porteen and Ballyrevagh.

=== Placename ===
The name of the SAC is given in Irish as Féarach Chill Fhiagláin on the Statutory Instrument for the site. The Irish placenames website Logainm.ie does not list this name. Killeglan Grassland SAC is to be found to the north of Killeglan townland, and the Irish name for this townland is Cill Dheagláin which equates to the church of Declan (a personal name). In the archival notes for this townland on Logainm.ie. Cill Fhiagláin or 'Feglan's church' is noted as one of the names for the area, from an 1837 note.

== Special Area of Conservation qualification ==
Under the European Union Habitats Directive 92/43/EEC and the Irish regulations which implement this Directive (European Communities (Birds and Natural Habitats) Regulations 2011 (S.I. No. 477 of 2011), Ireland is required to identify, legally designate and maintain or restore significant species and habitats to favourable status, to conserve biodiversity and halt ecosystem degradation in the European Union. Ireland has designated approximately 13,500 km^{2} as protected sites.

Under the Habitats Directive, habitats (under Annex I) and species (under Annex II) which are considered to be seriously threatened and at risk of extinction are designated as ‘priority’ habitats. The Killeglan Grassland site was designated as a Special Area of Conservation for one significant Habitats Directive Annex I priority habitat:

- Orchid‐rich calcareous grassland (priority habitat) [Natura 2000 code 6210]

The Natura 2000 habitat type 6210 refers to "Semi-natural dry grasslands and scrubland facies on calcareous substrates (Festuco-Brometalia) (* important orchid sites)". This habitat type is not by itself a priority habitat but is considered a priority habitat "on 'important orchid sites', by which one should understand the sites that are important on the basis of one or more of the following three criteria:

(a) the site hosts a rich suite of orchid species

(b) the site hosts an important population of at least one orchid species considered not very common on the national territory

(c) the site hosts one or several orchid species considered to be rare, very rare or exceptional on the national territory."

The Killeglan Grassland SAC does include many orchid species, including rare Red List species. In the habitat title, Festuco-Brometalia refers to steppic or subcontinental grasslands (Festucetalia valesiacae) and the grasslands of more oceanic and sub-Mediterranean regions (Brometalia erecti).

The current overall conservation status of orchid‐rich calcareous grassland in Ireland has been assessed as ‘bad with a deteriorating trend’,’, according to the 2019 EU report on the Status of EU Protected Habitats and Species in Ireland. However, the condition of Killeglan Grassland SAC is noted as "of outstanding quality and provides an excellent example of the Annex I priority habitat orchid-rich calcareous grasslands."

Orchids found at this SAC site include autumn lady's tresses (Spiranthes spiralis), common spotted-orchid (Dactylorhiza fuchsii), early-purple orchid (Orchis mascula), fragrant orchid (Gymnadenia conopsea), green-winged orchid (Orchis morio), lesser butterfly-orchid, (Platanthera bifolia) and pyramidal orchid (Anacamptis pyramidalis).

Calcareous grassland species recorded at the site include bulbous rush (Juncus bulbosus), carline thistle (Carlina vulgaris), carnation sedge (Carex panicea), cat's-ear (Hypochoeris radicata), clovers (Trifolium spp.), cock's foot (Dactylis glomerata), common bent (Agrostis capillaris), crested dog's-tail (Cynosurus cristatus), devil's-bit scabious (Succisa pratensis), daisy (Bellis perennis), dandelion (Taraxacum agg.), heather (Calluna vulgaris), mountain everlasting (Antennaria dioica), mouse-ear hawkweed (Hieracium pilosella), red fescue (Festuca rubra), ribwort plantain (Plantago lanceolata), sedges (Carex spp.), selfheal (Prunella vulgaris), sheep's sorrel (Rumex acetosella), wild thyme (Thymus praecox), yellow rattle (Rhinanthus minor), yarrow (Achillea millefolium) and Yorkshire fog (Holcus lanatus).

=== Geology ===
The Roscommon Geology Report describes the Killeglan karst landscape as "unique in lowland Ireland as it expresses what the entire lowland limestone landscape would have looked like before man modified the countrywide, by reclaiming land and building field boundaries." The report notes that the area should be designated as a geological Nature Heritage Area: "This is the only such area of lowland, boulder-strewn, limestone glacial karst in the country. It is of national importance."

== See also ==
- List of Special Areas of Conservation in the Republic of Ireland
