= Ballyprior Grassland =

Ecological site in County Laois, Ireland

- Féarach Bhaile an Phrióra
- Location within Ireland
- Location: County Laois, Ireland
- Nearest city: Stradbally, County Laois
- Coordinates: 52.984°N 7.131°W
- Area: 44.18 ha (109.2 acres)
- Established: 2016
- Governing body: National Parks and Wildlife Service

The Ballyprior Grassland (Irish: Féarach Bhaile an Phrióra) Special Area of Conservation or SAC is a designated Natura 2000 site in County Laois, near the town of Stradbally, Ireland.

== Location ==
Ballyprior Grassland Special Area of Conservation is located in County Laois, 4 km south of the town of Stradbally, in the townlands of Ballinteskin and Ballyprior. It is close to the proposed Natural Heritage Area (pNHA) of Stradbally Hill (site code 001800, a protected site designated for oak-ash-hazel woodland), which includes Oughaval Wood, once part of the Cosby estate. It is also situated close to the River Barrow and River Nore SAC (site code 002162) and to the Grand Canal pNHA (site code: 002104).

== Special Area of Conservation qualification ==
Ballyprior Grassland was proposed as a Site of Community Interest in 2002 and was designated as a Special Area of Conservation in 2016, under the qualifying Natura 2000 ecosystem interest: semi-natural dry grasslands and scrubland facies on calcareous substrates (Festuco-Brometalia) (* important orchid sites).

This is a Habitats Directive Annex I priority habitat. The specific Natura 2000 habitat type code number 6210: "Semi-natural dry grasslands and scrubland facies on calcareous substrates (Festuco-Brometalia)" is not by itself a considered an Annex I priority habitat (one considered seriously under threat and at risk of extinction), does merit the Annex I classification for orchid sites regarded as important (those with a rich range of orchid species, with a significant population of at least one uncommon orchid species, and with one or more orchid species considered to be nationally rare, very rare or exceptional), which is the case for Ballyprior. Key orchid species recorded at Ballyprior Grassland SAC include Early-purple Orchid (Orchis mascula), frog orchid (Coeloglossum viride) and common spotted-orchid (Dactylorhiza fuchsii).

=== Key grassland species ===
The National Parks and Wildlife Service (NPWS) describes Ballyprior as an important example of orchid-rich calcareous grassland, with rich flora and mycoflora, which especially important given that most similar grassland sites in the areas have been lost to the development of agricultural land. At the Ballyprior Grassland site, there is a high species diversity of grass and herb species, but low bryophyte cover (grassland bryophyte richness and cover decreases with land use intensification and fertiliser use – a known conservation threat at this site).

Key grassland species occurring here include Common Bent (Agrostis capillaris), Quaking-grass (Briza media), Crested Dog’s tail (Cynosurus cristatus), Sheep’s fescue (Festuca ovina) and Sweet Vernal-grass (Anthoxanthun odoratum). In addition to these, the biodiverse nature of this grassland is seen in the range of flora recorded here, including Autumn Gentian (Gentianella amarella), Carline Thistle (Carlina vulgaris), Fairy Flax (Linum catharticum), Field Wood-rush (Luzula campestris), Heath Dog-violet (Viola canina), Heath-grass (Danthonia decumbens), Lady’s Bedstraw (Galium verum), Maidenhair Spleenwort (Asplenium trichomanes), Mountain Everlasting (Antennaria dioica), Wild Thyme (Thymus praecox), Pignut (Conopodium majus) and Wild Carrot (Daucus carota) and various sedge species. The protected fauna of the site includes the Irish hare subspecies ( Lepus timidus hibernicus) a Red Data Book species.

Mycoflora recorded at this grassland site include Clavara fumosa, Dermoloma cuneifolium, Microglossum viride and several Hygrocybe and Entoloma species.

=== Conservation threats ===
The area around Ballyprior Grassland consists of improved farmland. Use of fertiliser and enrichment has resulted in a change from semi-natural grassland to semi-improved grassland at the west side of the site. Afforestation to the south of this area negatively impacted the bordering grassland habitat, and some areas of the site which had been damaged were removed from the SAC site designation.

The Ballyprior Grassland SAC is one of the key grassland sites monitored in the NPWS Grassland surveys. In the Leinster 2011-2012 survey, the Ballyprior Grassland site ranked most threatened with Ballymoon Esker in County Carlow. Several SAC sites, such as Ballyprior Grassland and Ballymoon Esker SAC, which had high conservation scores (22% and 38.9%, respectively) also had high threat scores which indicated that designating a site as protected did not reduce the threats to the site. The Leinster survey data found there were threats such as agricultural activity, damaging operations (drainage, dumping or recent afforestation) and the presence of agricultural weed species. Ballyprior Grassland had a total conservation score of 10.5/47.5 or 22.1%, and a conservation ranking of 29th (from 71 sites surveyed in the province of Leinster).

== See also ==
List of Special Areas of Conservation in the Republic of Ireland
