= The Murrough Wetlands =

Complex of wetlands in County Wicklow, Ireland

- Na Bogaigh Murrach
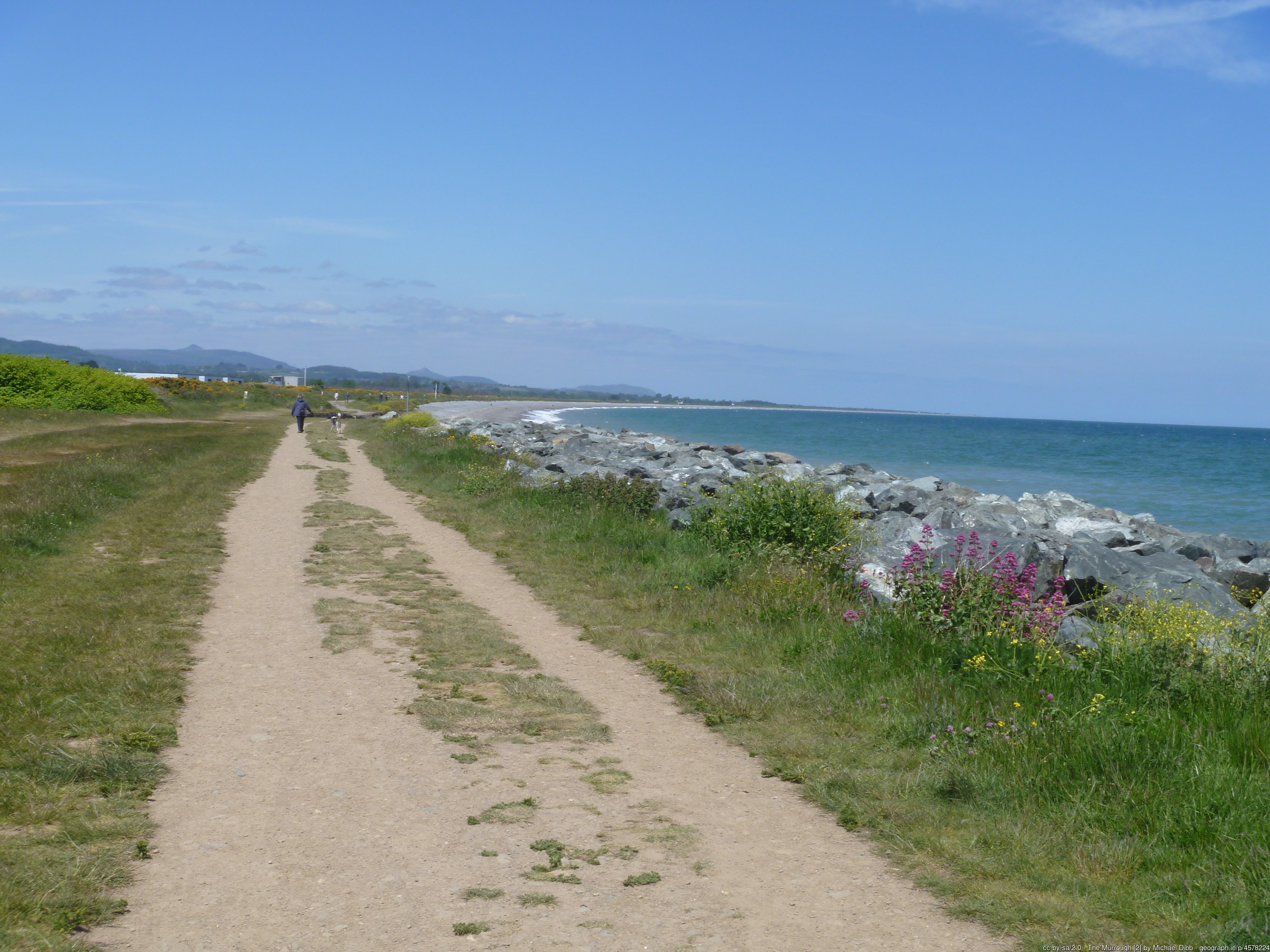
- Path along the shingle ridge on the seaward side of the Murrough Wetlands

- Location within Ireland
- Location: County Wicklow, Ireland
- Coordinates: 53°00′32″N 6°03′04″W
- Area: 1,489 acres (6.03 km^{2})
- Designation: Special Area of Conservation; Special Protection Area
- Governing body: National Parks and Wildlife Service

The Murrough Wetlands (Irish: Na Bogaigh Murrach) are a 15-kilometre (9.32 mi) long complex of coastal wetlands in County Wicklow, Ireland. The main wetland is centred around Broad Lough immediately north of Wicklow town. Broad Lough is a large estuarine lake that is cut off from the Irish Sea by a long, thin shingle ridge. Smaller, disconnected wetland areas such as the East Coast Nature Reserve and the Kicoole Marshes are also included in the complex. The Murrough Wetlands are the most extensive wetland area on the east coast of Ireland, and are an EU-designated Special Area of Conservation and Special Protection Area.

== Habitats ==
- Annual vegetation of drift lines
- Perennial vegetation of stony banks
- Atlantic salt meadows
- Mediterranean salt meadows
- Calcareous fens with Cladium mariscus and species of the Caricion davallianae
- Alkaline fens

== Bird species ==
- Eurasian reed warbler (Acrocephalus scirpaceus)
- Kingfisher (Alcedo atthis)
- Eurasian teal (Anas crecca)
- Eurasian wigeon (Anas penelope)
- Mallard (Anas platyrhynchos)
- Gadwall (Anas strepera)
- White-fronted Goose (Anser albifrons)
- Greylag Goose (Anser anser)
- Pale-bellied Brent Goose (Branta bernicla)
- Ringed Plover (Charadrius hiaticula)
- Western marsh harrier (Circus aeruginosus)
- Northern shoveler (Anas clypeata)
- Hen Harrier (Circus cyaneus)
- Whooper Swan (Cygnus cygnus)
- Little Egret (Egretta garzetta)
- Red-throated Diver (Gavia stellata)
- Eurasian oystercatcher (Haematopus ostralegus)
- European herring gull (Larus argentatus)
- Little Gull (Larus minutus)
- Black-headed Gull (Larus ridibundus)
- Eurasian curlew (Numenius arquata)
- Great cormorant (Phalacrocorax carbo)
- European golden plover (Pluvialis apricaria)
- Water Rail (Rallus aquaticus)
- Little Tern (Sterna albifrons)
- Little Grebe (Tachybaptus ruficollis)
- Common shelduck (Tadorna tadorna)
- Common redshank (Tringa totanus)
- Northern lapwing (Vanellus vanellus)

== See also ==
- List of Special Areas of Conservation in the Republic of Ireland
- List of Special Protection Areas in the Republic of Ireland
