= Rois =

Rois may refer to:

== People ==
- Carrie Rois, victim of Gary Ridgway
- Joan Roís de Corella (1435–1497), Valencian author
- Juancho Rois (1958-1994), Colombian musician
- Sophie Rois, Austrian actress
- Róis (Rose Connolly), Northern Irish composer and singer

== Places ==
- Rois, Spain
- Rois-bheinn, Scotland
- Loch an Rois, Ireland

== See also ==
Rois is also the plural form of roi, which is French for king. For that reason, the word rois appears in the title of many books and films:
