= Ballymaglancy Cave =

Cave and conservation area in County Galway, Ireland

- Pollwalter
- Location within Ireland
- Location: County Galway, Ireland
- Coordinates: 53°32′16″N 9°20′17″W
- Length: 726 metres (2,382 ft)
- Elevation: 36 m
- Geology: Carboniferous limestone
- Show cave length: 726 metres (2,382 ft)

The Ballymaglancy cave (Irish: Uaimh Bhaile Mhic Fhlannchaidh) Special Area of Conservation is a linear stream cave and Natura 2000 site in County Galway, close to the town of Cong. The site qualifies for Special Area of Conservation status under two related criteria: the presence of the lesser horseshoe bat (Rhinolophus hipposideros) and the presence of caves not open to the public.

== Location ==
The Ballymaglancy Cave Special Area of Conservation (or SAC) is located in the townland of Baile Mhic Fhlannchaidh in County Galway, approximately 3 km west of the town of Cong, County Mayo, close to the county border. The designated site is 9.3 ha in size.

=== Placename ===
The name Ballymaglancy Cave in Irish is given as Uaimh Bhaile Mhic Fhlannchaidh in the Irish placenames website ‘Logainm.ie’. This corresponds to the cave of the town or townland of the family with the surname Mic Fhlannchaidh, and that Irish surname can correspond to the English surnames Clancy or Glancy. The Galway Community Heritage website describe several variants of the name of the site: “According to O’Donovan’s field name books 1838, the standard name given to the townland was Ballymaglancy and Baile Meg Fhlannchadha was its official Irish form. Other names for this townland were Ballimaglanchy (O Donovan’s Field Name Books), Ballymaghanchy (Inquis. Temp. Car. I), and Baile Mhic Fhlannchaidh (Logainm.ie). According to Coimisiúin na Logainmneacha (logainm.ie), Ballymaglancy had a minor feature called Pollwalter (Linn an Mhuilinn).” Pollwalter is also noted as an alternative name for the site in the County geological site report for Galway.

== Site description ==
The two qualifying features for SAC status for the site are the presence of ‘caves not open to the public’ and the presence of lesser horseshoe bats. These two features are linked, as the cave is a habitat for a protected species of bat. The site was proposed as a Site of Community Importance (or SCI) in January 2002 and was subsequently designated as an SAC in 2016 under Statutory Instrument S.I. No. 242/2016 - European Union Habitats (Ballymaglancy Cave, Cong Special Area of Conservation 000474) Regulations 2016.

=== Lesser horseshoe bat ===
All bats in Ireland are protected, under the Irish Wildlife Act 1976 and it is an offence to disturb, injure or kill bats or disturb or destroy their roosts. The lesser horseshoe bat (Rhinolophus hipposideros) is the only species of the Rhinolophidae family of bats to occur in Ireland. The lesser horseshoe bat is specifically protected as a European Habitats Directive Annex II species (all bat species are listed in Annex IV of this Directive) and is listed in the Berne Convention. The population is small but increasing in Ireland. The Vincent Wildlife Trust estimate the population at approximately 14,000. According to the Irish Government’s lesser horseshoe bat action plan 2022-2026, the most recent population estimate was 12, 870, occurring in only six counties in the west of Ireland in fragmented colonies of varying size, and its conservation status was recorded as ‘unfavourable inadequate’ in the 2017 European Union assessment report. It is vulnerable to habitat loss and disturbance. Bat Conservation Ireland, the Irish National Parks and Wildlife Service and the Vincent Wildlife Trust are responsible for monitoring the roosts of this species in summer and its hibernation (in caves, souterrains and other such locations) in winter.

The National Parks and Wildlife Service site synopsis for the Ballymaglancy site notes that lesser horseshoe bats have been recorded at this location since at least 1993–1994. The size of the colony here varies and is dependent on external temperature. The numbers in the colony have exceeded 50 bats in times of sustained cold periods, while in times of warmer air temperatures the numbers of bats can decrease to approximately 35 bats. The site is considered to be of international importance for this species, given the size of the colony is at least 50 bats. The site synopsis document states that the majority of the colony hibernate within 20 m of the entrance to the cave. This cave is considered to be the most suitable location for hibernation for bats in the Cong area, given the availability of low, dry passageways close to the entrance of the cave.

=== Caves not open to the public ===
The habitat type “caves not open to the public” is an Annex I habitat type under the European Habitats Directive. The Interpretation Manual of European Union Habitats (EUR28) gives the general description of this protected habitat as: “Caves not open to the public, including their water bodies and streams, hosting specialised or high endemic species, or that are of paramount importance for the conservation of Annex II species (e.g. bats, amphibians).”

The National Parks and Wildlife Service site synopsis document for the site describes the cave entrance as 2 m high and 3 m wide. The cave widens inside the entrance and opens to several routes which subsequently converge to a single route. A number of geological formations or speleothems can be seen near the entrance, including Carboniferous colonial coral in the floor and a roof collapse with examples of rimstone or gour pools (a type of rimstone structure. Further into the cave, the cave stream can be seen to descend in steps. There are several other speleotherms in the cave, including curtains. This is considered to be “an excellent and fairly extensive (>500 m) example of a natural limestone cave”.

The Ballymaglancy Cave may be less prone to flooding than some other caves in the area, but does flood to the cave roof on occasion and thus, entry in wet weather is to be avoided. The cave is on private land and permission must be requested for access to this site. In a description of a cave visit by experts for a University of Bristol Spelaeological Society survey from 2012, Hadfield (2013) notes Ballynaglancy cave is 726m in length and 11m in depth. Tracing of the cave stream showed that it rises near the village of Cong and flows through the nearby caves of Pollpuisin, Pigeon Hole, Wolves’ Hole and pseudo-Priests Hole.

The cave stream deepens and forms a waterfall of 3 metres at a point within the cave. Further into the cave, calcite flows and wall cascades of flowstone or dripstone can be seen. In 1951, exploration of the cave was carried out by J. C. Coleman and N. J. Dunnington, and several of the cave structures are described. “The vertical limestone walls are curiously fretted into a series of almost, interlocking fragments of rock which jut out as spurs, and shelves, in places completely across the fissure…I have not seen this formation in any other Irish cave so far. It appears to be a solutional phenomenon; differential erosion, due to variations of rock purity and the presence of chert might account for the fretwork. To a limited extent it occurs downstream in the cave.”

In addition to Ballymaglancy Cave, the Ballymaglancy Resurgence cave has also been described. While the entrance to Ballymaglancy Resurgence cave is in Galway, much of the cave is located under County Mayo. Ballynaglancy resurgence cave is 417m in length (with 50m unsurveyed as of 2015), and is 5 m in height. This site is also prone to flooding. Names of the various sections of the cave include ‘Wet Ear Passage’, ‘Mud Chamber’ and ‘Boulder Chamber’. The roof is low, requiring a crawl approach. There are several cave formations here, including gour pools and flowstone walls.

== Conservation objectives ==
The primary conservation objective for the site is to restore the favourable conservation condition of the lesser horseshoe bat in Ballymaglancy Cave SAC. The conservation of the cave habitat is linked to that of the bat species, so separate conservation objectives were not listed for this feature. A qualified mean of 28 bats was recorded from the 2013-2017 winter annual count data was calculated. From this, a minimum qualifying standard of 50 bats was set as the target to be maintained (or improved on) for this site. The objectives state that there should be no decline in the quality of the winter root or auxiliary roots, and also that there should be no decline in the foraging area or foraging routes for 2.5 km around the site. Light pollution is a consideration for this species, so the objectives note that artificial lighting should not be increased close to the roost, along foraging routes or within 2.5 km of it, as bats may abandon their roost site with an increase in inappropriate lighting.

=== Conservation threats ===
The Biodiversity Information System for Europe (BISE) (created by the European Environment Agency) notes the threats, pressures and activities likely to have an effect on this site. Threats and pressures noted include outdoor sports and leisure activities, recreational activities (high risk) and Speleology (medium risk), while activities listed as likely to impact the site include grazing (medium risk).

== Culture ==
The cave complexes located around the town of Cong, County Mayo, of which Ballymaglancy Cave is one, have been immortalised in music - the Irish air "The Caves of Cong". The score of this piece of music (also known as "Bean an Fhir Ruadh" or "The Red Haired Man’s Wife") is available from the Irish Traditional Music Archive, as part of the Collection of Irish Airs, Marches and Dances, Vol. 1, of 1927, edited by Francis Murphy

== See also ==
- List of towns and villages in Ireland
- List of Special Areas of Conservation in the Republic of Ireland
- List of caves
