= Ballyarr Wood =

Nature reserve in County Donegal, Ireland

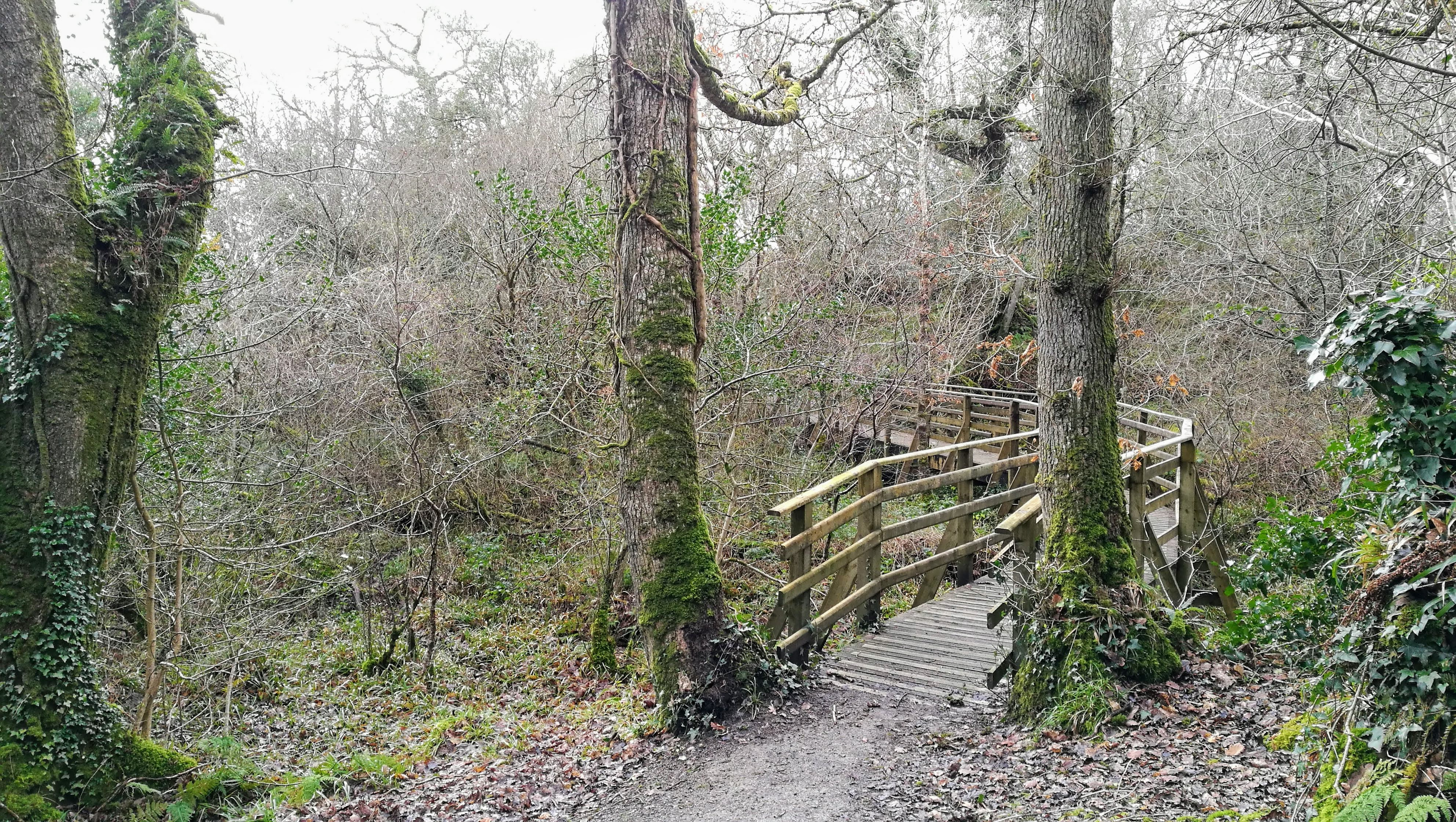

- Location within Ireland
- Interactive map of Ballyarr Wood
- Type: National
- Location: near Ramelton, County Donegal
- Coordinates: 55°01′44″N 7°42′42″W
- Area: 74 acres (29.95 ha)
- Operator: National Parks and Wildlife Service (Ireland)
- Status: Open all year

Ballyarr Wood is a national nature reserve of approximately 74 acres (0.30 km^{2}) located near Ramelton, County Donegal, Ireland. It is managed by the Irish National Parks & Wildlife Service, part of the Department of Arts, Heritage and the Gaeltacht.

== Features ==
Ballyarr Wood was legally protected as a national nature reserve by the Irish government in 1986. The wood features one of north-west Ireland's best and largest semi-natural deciduous woodlands. It contains old sessile oak woods, with holly and hazel trees. Other habitats include scrub, wet grassland, wet woodland, and wet heath. It is also a Special Area of Conservation under the EU Habitats Directive, listed in Annex I of the Directive.

As part of the management of the wood, grazing livestock have been removed from the area, allowing a natural regeneration of the trees such as rowan and oak. During the winter months, small horses are grazed there in keeping with local tradition to eat rushes, grasses and sedges to open up ground for tree saplings to grow. The hazel trees are coppiced, and non-native trees are being removed from the site.

Badgers, stoats, and foxes are known to inhabit the wood, and occasional visitors include deer. Buzzards and ravens nest in the wood, and many native Irish woodland birds also inhabit the area.
