= Lough Golagh =

Lake in south County Donegal, Ireland

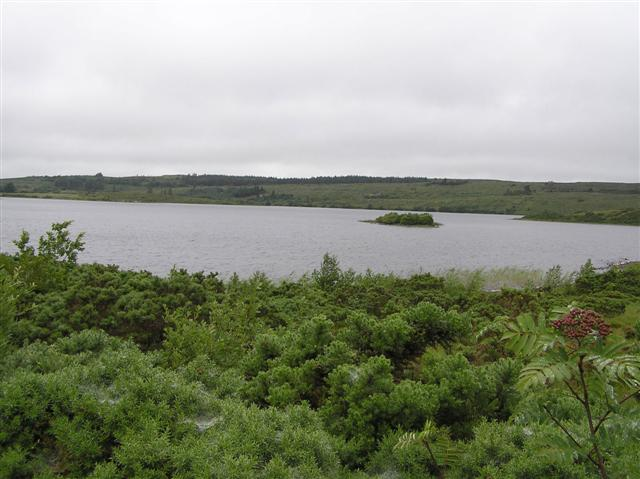

- Location in Ireland
- Location: County Donegal
- Coordinates: 54°32′26″N 8°3′17″W
- Catchment area: 4.59 km^{2} (1.8 sq mi)
- Basin countries: Ireland
- Max. length: 1.5 km (1 mi)
- Max. width: 0.9 km (0.6 mi)
- Surface area: 0.60 km^{2} (0.23 sq mi)
- Surface elevation: 101 m (331 ft)

Lough Golagh is a freshwater lake in the northwest of Ireland. It is located in south County Donegal.

== Geography ==
Lough Golagh is located about 10 kilometres (6 mi) northeast of Ballyshannon. It measures about 1.5 km (0.9 mi) long west–east and 1.0 km (0.6 mi) wide.

== Natural history ==
Lough Golagh forms part of the Lough Golagh and Breesy Hill Special Area of Conservation. An island in the lake supports important bird species including common tern and black-headed gull.

== See also ==
- List of loughs in Ireland
