= Cregg House Stables =

Ecological site in County Galway, Ireland

Cregg House Stables, Crusheen SAC
- Stáblaí Teach na Creige, An Chreisín
- Location within Ireland
- Location: County Galway, Ireland
- Nearest city: Gort, County Galway
- Coordinates: 52°59′17″N 8°50′36″W
- Area: 0.02 hectares (0.049 acres)
- Governing body: National Parks and Wildlife Service
- Website: https://www.npws.ie/protected-sites/sac/002317

The Cregg House Stables, Crusheen SAC (Irish: Stáblaí Teach na Creige, An Chreisín) is a Natura 2000 Special Area of Conservation (SAC) 10 km south of the town of Gort, County Galway, Ireland. The site has been designated as an SAC for the presence of Lesser horseshoe bats.

== Special Area of Conservation ==
The Cregg House Stables, Crusheen SAC is a key ecological maternity site for the lesser horseshoe bat. An important summer roost site is recorded at this site, and there may be other unrecorded lesser roost sites there also. The site consists of a stone stable block with a slate roof, and the bats roost in the loft.

The site was established as a proposed candidate Special Area of Conservation in 2003, and was included on the initial list of sites of Community importance for the Atlantic biogeographical region of the European Commission in 2004.

In 2023, the European Union took a legal case against Ireland for failing to designate 217 of 423 sites as SACs under the Habitats Directive and for failing to set site-specific conservation objectives (SSCO) for 140 sites – Cregg House Stables SAC was one of the Galway sites included in this case, as it had not been formally designated as an SAC by statutory instrument, though SSCOs had been issued for the site.
