= Ballyteigue =

Nature reserve and Special Area of Conservation in County Clare, Ireland

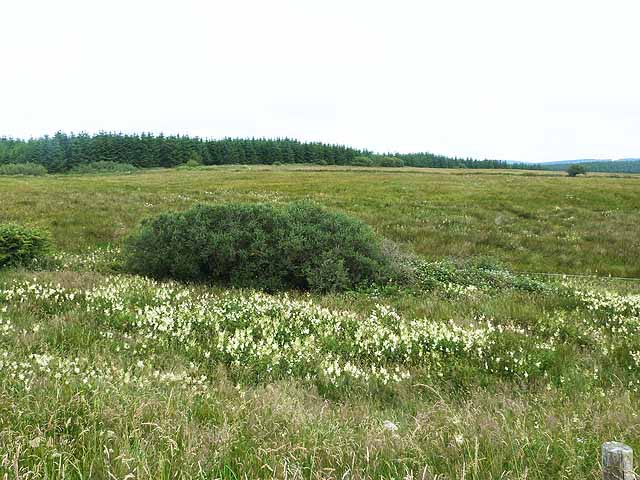
- Hay meadow at Ballyteige

- Location within Ireland
- Interactive map of Ballyteigue
- Type: National
- Location: County Clare
- Coordinates: 53°01′34″N 9°15′58″W
- Area: 15.8 acres (6.39 ha)
- Operator: National Parks and Wildlife Service (Ireland)
- Status: Open all year

Ballyteigue or Ballyteige is a national nature reserve of approximately 15.8 acres (0.064 km^{2}) in County Clare, Ireland. It is 1.5 km east of Lisdoonvarna. Ballyteigue is managed by the Irish National Parks & Wildlife Service.

== Features ==
Ballyteigue, also known as Ballyteige, was legally protected as a national nature reserve by the Irish government in 1986. It has also been designated a Special Area of Conservation.

Ballyteigue is composed of five parcels of wet meadow heath or molinia meadows. The land is managed using traditional hay-making techniques which maintain the wet meadows as examples of a habitat that is typical of the region. There is a large number of marsh orchids. Irish hare, snipe, common frogs, and orange tip butterflies are endemic to the reserve.
