= Cloonacleigha Lough =

Freshwater lake in the northwest of Ireland

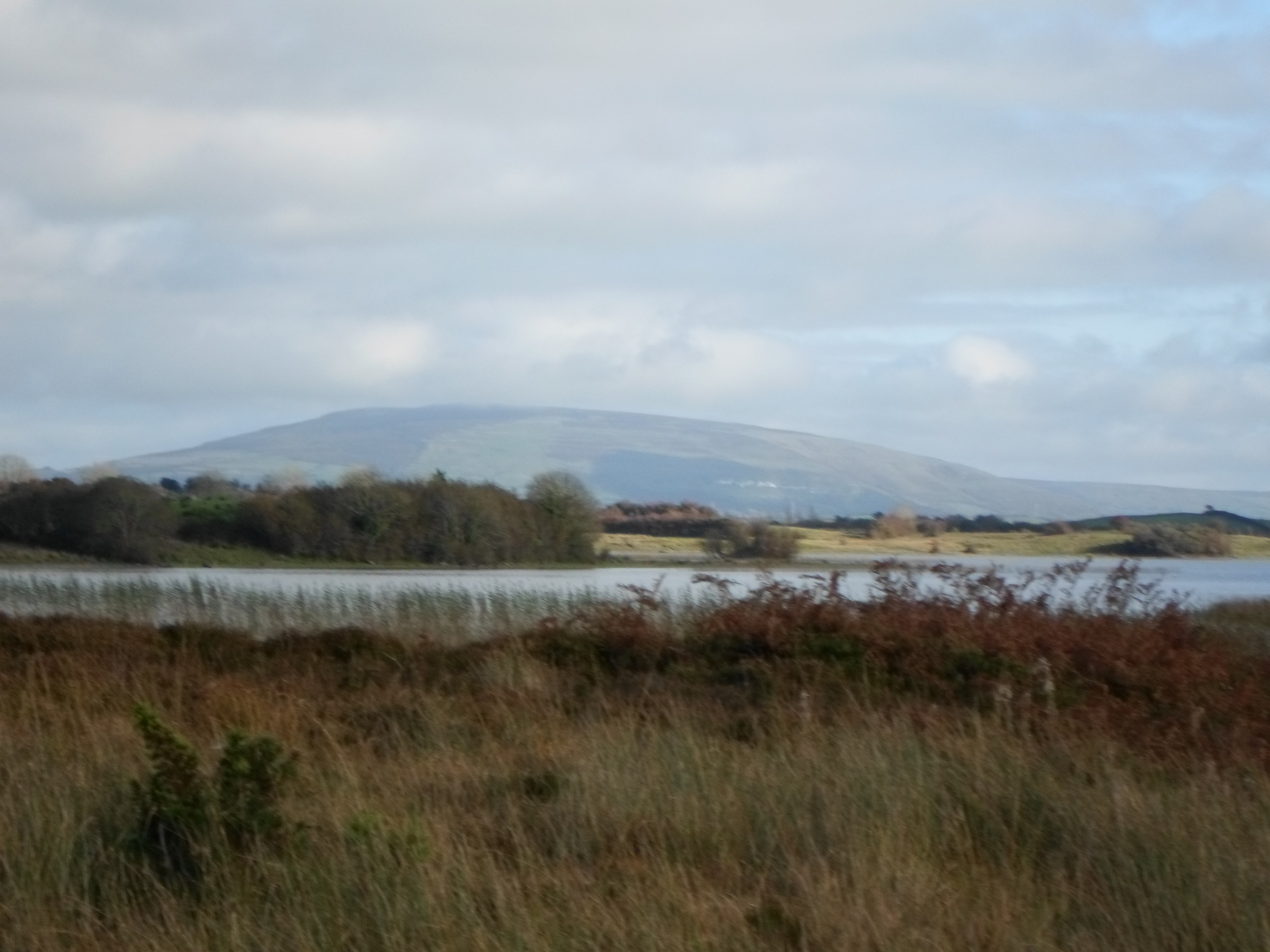
- Lake towards Keshcorran Hill

- Location in Ireland
- Location: County Sligo
- Coordinates: 54°4′55″N 8°35′52″W
- Primary outflows: Templehouse Lough
- Catchment area: 32.63 km^{2} (13 sq mi)
- Basin countries: Ireland
- Max. length: 1.25 km (0.78 mi)
- Max. width: 0.8 km (0.5 mi)
- Surface area: 0.62 km^{2} (0.24 sq mi)
- Surface elevation: 57 m (187 ft)

Cloonacleigha Lough is a freshwater lake in the northwest of Ireland. It is located in south County Sligo and forms part of the course of the Owenmore River.

== Geography ==
Cloonacleigha Lough measures about 1 km (0.6 mi) long and 1 km (0.6 mi) wide. It lies about 30 kilometres (19 mi) south of Sligo and 7 km (4 mi) west of Ballymote.

== Natural history ==
Fish present in Cloonacleigha Lough include pike. A number of duck species winter in the area of the lake including teal, wigeon, mallard, tufted duck and goldeneye. Wader bird species include lapwing, curlew and Greenland white-fronted goose. Other bird species found in the area of the lake include mute swan and great crested grebe.

Cloonacleigha Lough is part of the Templehouse and Cloonacleigha Loughs Special Area of Conservation as a hard water lake habitat.

== See also ==
- List of loughs in Ireland
