= Redwood Bog =

Bog and nature reserve in County Tipperary, Ireland

- Interactive map of Redwood Bog
- Location: County Tipperary, Ireland
- Coordinates: 53°09′14″N 8°04′52″W
- Area: 326 acres (1.32 km^{2})
- Governing body: National Parks and Wildlife Service

Redwood Bog is a raised bog and national nature reserve of approximately 326 acres (1.32 km^{2}) in County Tipperary.

== Features ==
Redwood Bog was legally protected as a national nature reserve by the Irish government in 1991. It is also a Special Area of Conservation.

The raised bog was previously owned by Bord na Móna who had purchased the Bog for conservation. It lies on the southern margin of the Little Brosna River flood plain where it meets the River Shannon at the Middle Shannon Callows. As part of the Little Brosna Callows it is deemed to be an internationally important as a classical example of a flood plain ecosystem and a wildfowl habitat. The Bog also contains the last mostly intact bog dome on the flood plain margin, a dried out portion of another dome, and an area of fen. This dome has raised bog flora and in the centre it has quaking areas and numerous bog pools.

The reserve has Sphagnum moss lawns, wet flats, pools, hummocks, soaks and flushes. Some areas have been degraded from turf cutting and drainage, but have been assessed as capable of regeneration. Flora that has been recorded on the site include white beak-sedge, brown beak-sedge, bog asphodel, sundews, deergrass, and carnation sedge. The Greenland white-fronted goose has been recorded at the reserve.
