= Black Head-Poulsallagh =

Ecological site in County Clare, Ireland

Black Head-Poulsallagh Complex SAC
- Coimpléacs Cheann Boirne-Pholl Salach
- Location within Ireland
- Location: County Clare, Ireland
- Nearest city: Ennis, County Clare
- Coordinates: 53°06′02″N 9°16′06″W
- Area: 7,801.99 hectares (19,279.1 acres)
- Governing body: National Parks and Wildlife Service

The Black Head-Poulsallagh Complex (Irish: Coimpléacs Cheann Boirne-Pholl Salach) is a Natura 2000 Special Area of Conservation or SAC in County Clare, close to the towns of Ballyvaughan and Lisdoonvarna in County Clare, Ireland. The site has been designated as an SAC for multiple ecological features, such as reefs, semi-natural dry grasslands and limestone pavements.

== Background ==
The Black Head-Poulsallagh Complex is a key ecological site, encompassing approximately 7,800 hectares. This is a karst limestone region of the Burren, which also includes a freshwater system, several marine habitats and caves. It qualifies as an SAC under several categories, including 11 protected ecosystems and one protected species.

The ecosystem features many good examples of key Burren habitats, for which it is conserved. The Natura 2000 ecosystem categories for which the Complex is significant are: limestone pavements (Natura code 8240), reefs (Natura code 1170), submerged or partially submerged sea caves (Natura code 8330), petrifying springs with tufa formation (Cratoneurion) (Natura code 7220), perennial vegetation of stony banks (Natura code 1220), fixed coastal dunes with herbaceous vegetation (grey dunes) (Natura code 2130), water courses of plain to montane levels with the ‘’Ranunculion fluitantis’’ and Callitricho-Batrachion vegetation (Natura code 3260), alpine and boreal heaths (Natura code 4060), Juniperus communis formations on heaths or calcareous grasslands (Natura code 5130), semi-natural dry grasslands and scrubland facies on calcareous substrates (Festuco-Brometalia) (* important orchid sites) (Natura code 6210), and lowland hay meadows (Alopecurus pratensis, Sanguisorba officinalis) (Natura code 6510).

=== Limestone pavements ===
Approximately 4,686 hectares of the site consists of limestone pavements, of the blocky, shattered and smooth types.

The site includes areas of karren – the surface features of limestone landscapes formed by the dissolution of the limestone into channels, ridges and depressions. At this site, the dissolution is caused by the action of respired carbon dioxide and the action of marine organisms.

=== Protected species ===
The species for which this site qualifies as an SAC is the liverwort ‘’Petalophyllum ralfsii’’ (Petalwort) (Natura code 1395), and Ireland may have the highest proportion of the world population of this plant.

== Nearby sites of interest ==
This SAC is rich in ecological habitats of interest and the context in which it sits is of similar ecological interest. Moneen Mountain and East Burren Complex SAC and proposed Natural Heritage Area (pNHA) sites, Galway Bay SAC, pNHA and Special Protection Area (SPA) site, and Cliffs of Moher pNHA and SPA site are close to the Black Head-Poulsallagh Complex and share several of the criteria qualifying it for SAC status. Similarly, Carrowmore Point to Spanish Point and Islands SAC, Kilkee Reefs SAC and Inagh River Estuary SAC are situated close by.

== Black Head Lighthouse ==
The Black Head Lighthouse, based in the Burren at the most northerly point of County Clare at 53°09′14″N 9°15′54″W, was built in 1935. It was originally constructed to facilitate the safe harbour of transatlantic liners at Ballyvaughan, delivering passengers to and from, Galway city. It was originally built and managed by Galway Harbour Commissioners but this became financially unviable with the Second World War, when transatlantic liners no longer visited the area and after which time the liners did not return. The management of the lighthouse was transferred to Irish Lights in 1955.

The light was changed from carbide-to-water acetylene generators to propane in 1980, and in 2002 this was changed to solar power. The current flash character for Blackhead Lighthouse (Clare) is 1.0 second flash every 5.0 seconds. The white light has a range of 11 nautical miles, while the red light, designed to cover Loo Rock and assist in illuminating the anchorage, has a range of 8 nautical miles. The lighthouse is 8 metres in height, a two-storey square building.

== Archaeology ==
This landscape is rich in archaeology and one of the best-known forts in the area is Caherdooneerish (Cathair Dhún Irghus) or Caherdoonfergus stone fort. Situated above Black Head Lighthouse, it is a D-shaped fort, reputed to have been associated with Irghus, one of the Firbolg chieftains.
