= Kindrum Lough =

Lake in County Donegal, Ireland

- Loch Chionn Droma (Irish)
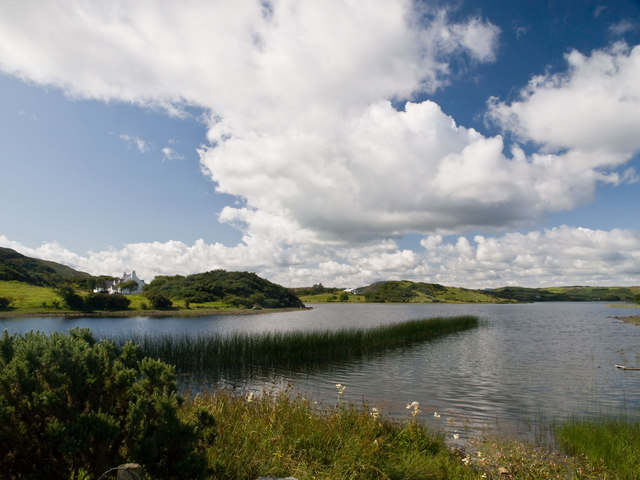

- Location in Ireland
- Location: County Donegal
- Coordinates: 55°14′0″N 7°42′44″W
- Primary inflows: Cashlan Stream
- Catchment area: 3.67 km^{2} (1.4 sq mi)
- Basin countries: Ireland
- Max. length: 1.6 km (1 mi)
- Max. width: 1.0 km (0.6 mi)
- Surface area: 0.61 km^{2} (0.24 sq mi)
- Average depth: 6.6 m (22 ft)
- Max. depth: 15 m (49 ft)
- Surface elevation: 8 m (26 ft)

Kindrum Lough (Irish: Loch Chionn Droma) is a freshwater lake in the northwest of Ireland. It is located in north County Donegal on the Fanad Peninsula.

== Geography ==
Kindrum Lough is about 5 kilometres (3 mi) northwest of Portsalon. It measures about 1.5 km (0.9 mi) long west–east and 1 km (0.6 mi) wide.

== Hydrology ==
Kindrum Lough is fed mainly by the Cashlan Stream entering at its southeastern end. The lake drains southwards into Mulroy Bay. Kindrum Lough is oligotrophic.

== Natural history ==
Fish species in Kindrum Lough include brown trout, Arctic char, three-spined stickleback and the critically endangered European eel. Two rare plant species have been recorded from the lake: slender naiad (Najas flexilis) and a stonewort, Nitella spanioclema. The latter species is considered endemic to County Donegal. Kindrum Lough is part of the Kindrum Lough Special Area of Conservation.

== See also ==
- List of loughs in Ireland
