= Lough Bane =

Lake in Counties Meath and Westmeath, Ireland

- An Loch Bán (Irish)
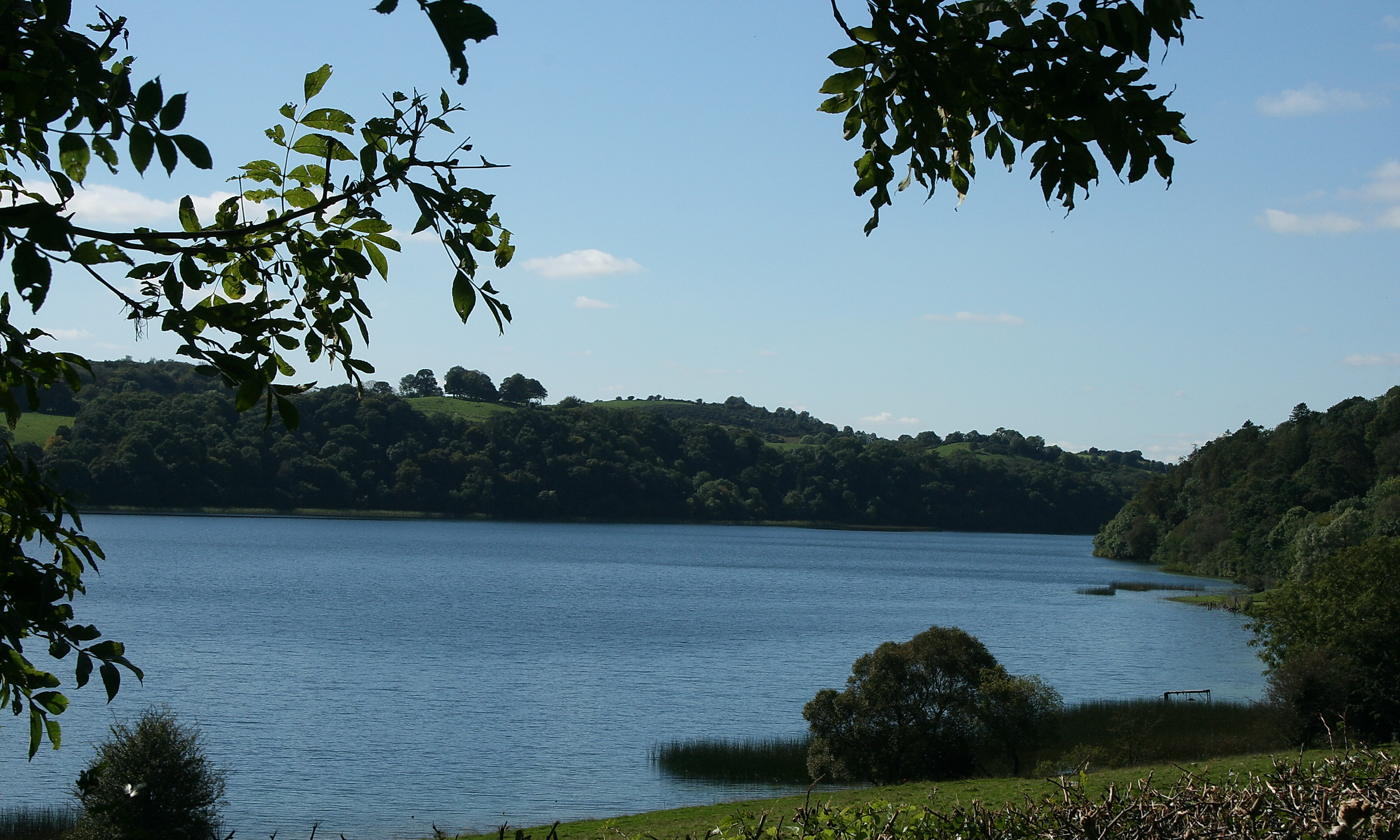

- Location in Ireland
- Location: County Meath and County Westmeath
- Coordinates: 53°41′20″N 7°10′20″W
- Type: Glacial lake
- Primary outflows: River Deel
- Catchment area: 4.7 km^{2} (1.8 sq mi)
- Basin countries: Ireland
- Surface area: 0.75 km^{2} (0.29 sq mi)
- Max. depth: 16 m (52 ft)
- Surface elevation: 112 m (367 ft)

Lough Bane (/lɒx ˈbæn/, lokh BAN; Irish: An Loch Bán) is a lake on the border of County Meath and County Westmeath in Ireland. The county border runs east–west through the centre of the lake.

Lough Bane forms part of the Lough Bane and Lough Glass Special Area of Conservation. The lake is the largest of three lakes in the SAC, the others being Lough Glass and Lough Glass North. Lough Bane is located about 10 km (6 mi) from Oldcastle, County Meath.

== Hydrology ==
Lough Bane is part of the River Boyne catchment. The lake flows out to the River Deel at the lake's southeastern end. The maximum lake depth is 16 m (52 ft). The lake is oligotrophic but considered vulnerable to pollution due to being surrounded by pasture land in a valley location.

Lough Bane supplies water to the towns of Kells and Oldcastle. As of 2018, the Lough Bane water treatment plant supplied 2,500,000 litres (550,000 imp gal; 660,000 US gal) of water per day. A 2018 drought led to the lake recording its lowest level in over 30 years. Falling water levels have exposed marl layers on the lake shore.

== Natural history ==
Fish species in Lough Bane include perch, brown trout, rainbow trout, pike, nine-spined stickleback and the critically endangered European eel. Perch are the dominant fish species. Both trout species are stocked by the Lough Bane Angling Association. A population of white-clawed crayfish was declared extinct at the lake in 1986. Bird life at Lough Bane includes little grebe, cormorant, lapwing, curlew and snipe.

The lake waters host a number of stonewort algae species: Chara rudis, Chara curta, Chara globularis and Chara contraria. Such healthy Chara ecosystems are increasingly rare. Shoreline vegetation includes the wetland species common club-rush, devil's-bit scabious, meadow thistle and meadowsweet. Shoreline tree species include beech, holly and hazel.

== Gallery ==
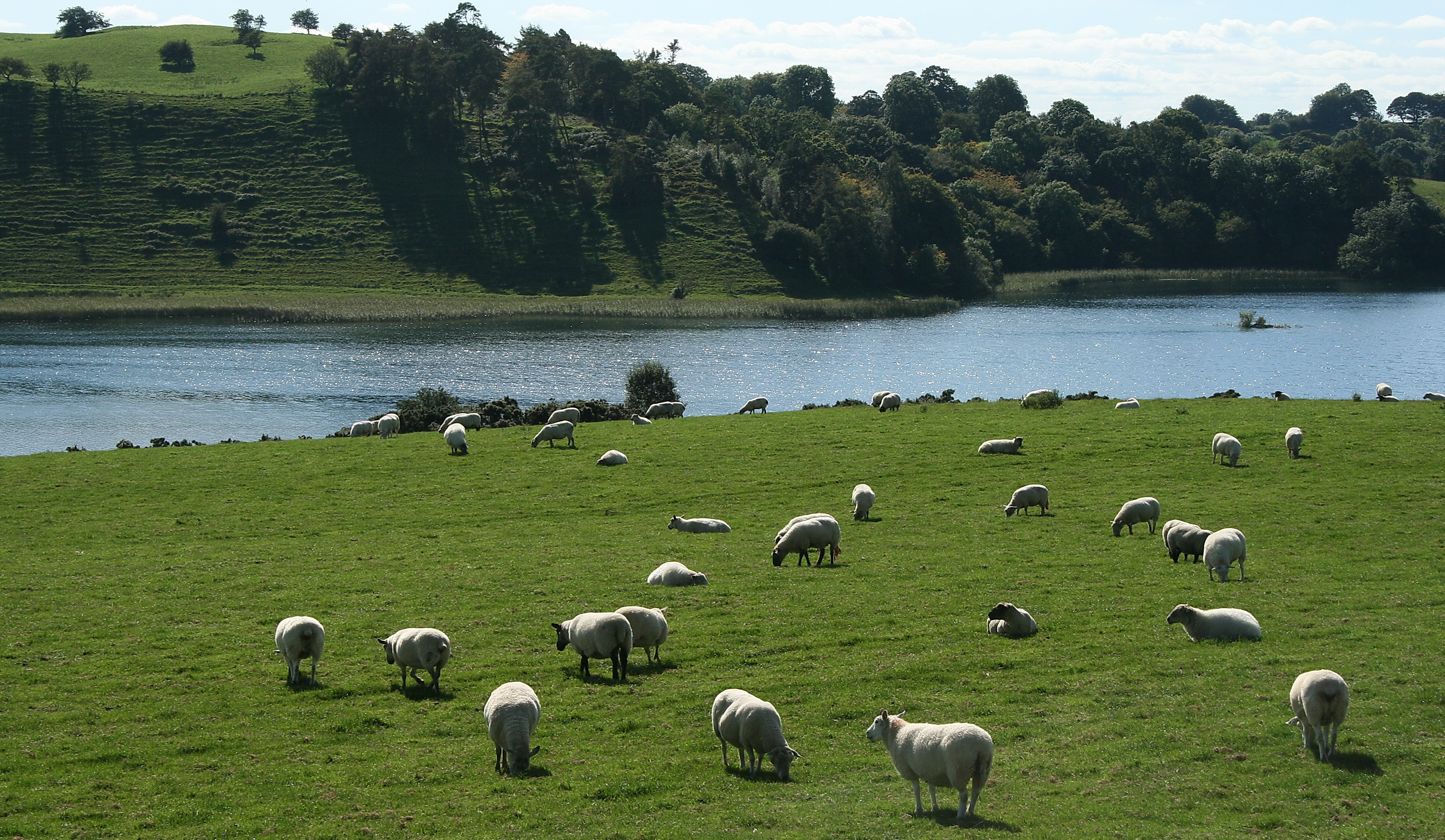
View from County Meath

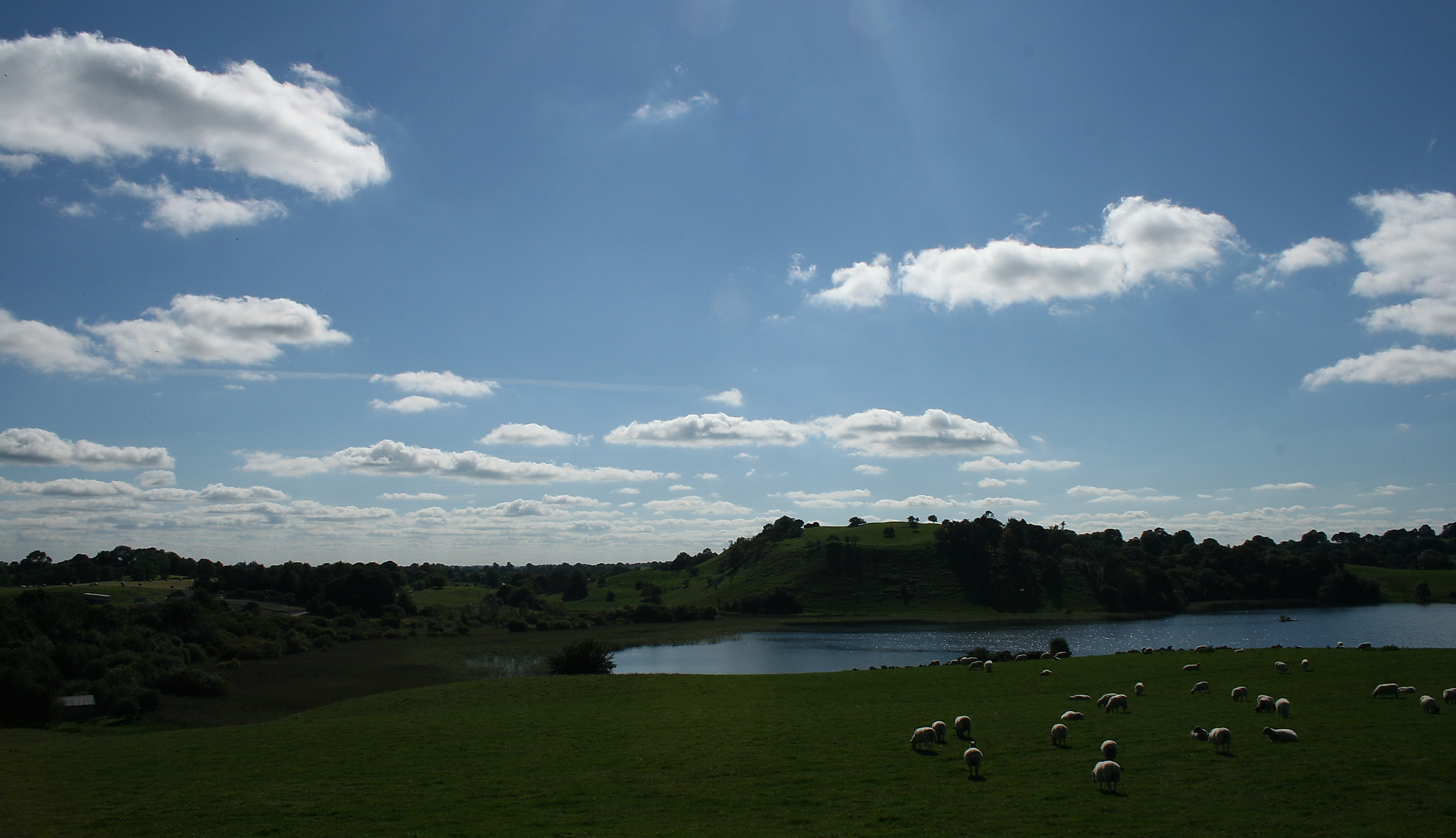
Looking east on Lough Bane

== See also ==
- List of loughs in Ireland
- List of Special Areas of Conservation in the Republic of Ireland
