= Red Bog =

Ecological site in County Kildare, Ireland

Red Bog, Kildare
- An Mhóin Rua
- Location within Ireland
- Location: County Kildare, Ireland
- Nearest city: Newbridge
- Coordinates: 53°11′47″N 6°32′07″W
- Area: 4.1 hectares (10 acres)
- Governing body: National Parks and Wildlife Service

The Red Bog (Irish: an Mhóin Rua) Special Area of Conservation or SAC is a Natura 2000 site in County Kildare, close to the town of Blessington in County Wicklow, Ireland. The qualifying interests by which it is protected as an SAC are the presence of a specific habitat type: transitional mires and quaking bogs.

== Location ==
The Red Bog SAC is located close to Blessington, County Wicklow, in the townland of Redbog, County Kildare. Schedule 1 of the Statutory Instrument for this site (S.I. No. 76/2018) identifies it as encompassing an area of 4.1 hectares.

== SAC qualification ==
The Red Bog site was designated as a Natura 2000 site in 2003 under the Habitats Directive. Statutory Instrument No. 76 of 2018, establishing the site as an SAC (Site code: 000397), was passed in 2018. According to the NPWS site synopsis, the feature which qualifies this site for an SAC designation is the presence of one specific protected habitat type, that of ‘Transition Mires’ (Natura 2000 code 7140). The Biodiversity Information System for Europe web page for the site notes one protected habitat at the site: Bogs, mires and fens - specifically, transition mires and quaking bogs. The EUNIS web page for this SAC, however, notes three protected habitats at the Red Bog site:

- Natural eutrophic lakes with Magnopotamion- or Hydrocharition-type vegetation (Natura 2000 code 3150)
- Active raised bog (Natura 2000 code 7110)
- Transition mires and quaking bogs (Natura code 7140).

The National Parks and Wildlife Service (NPWS) has included an area of 36.49 hectares at the Red Bog site as a proposed Natural Heritage Area or pNHA. Very close to this site, Poulaphouca Reservoir SAC has also been included as a pNHA.

The Red Bog site was noted in the Goodwillie report of 1972 as being of ecological, botanical, and ornithological interest. This report also noted that any drainage of the area would be significantly detrimental to the Red Bog lake, which was described as the most ecologically valuable lake in County Kildare.

== Features ==
The significant ecological features of the Red Bog site are described in the National Parks and Wildlife Service site synopsis for the site. The Red Bog is a wetland complex, including lake, bog and fen. It is located between morainic ridges of glacial deposits. The rock layer underneath is Ordovician. It is considered a good example of transition mire. Transition mires and quaking bogs, according to the EUNIS description, are:

“Peat-forming communities developed at the oligotrophic to mesotrophic water surfaces, with characteristics intermediate between soligenous and ombrogenous types. They present a large and diverse range of plant communities. In large peaty systems, the most prominent communities are swaying swards, floating carpets or quaking mires formed by medium-sized or small sedges, associated with sphagnum or brown mosses. They are generally accompanied by aquatic and amphibious communities. In the Boreal region this habitat type includes minerotrophic fens that are not part of a larger mire complex, open swamps and small fens in the transition zone between water (lakes, ponds) and mineral soil. These mires and bogs belong to the Scheuchzerietalia palustris order (oligotrophic floating carpets among others) and to the Caricetalia fusca order (quaking communities). Oligotrophic water-land interfaces with Carex rostrata are included.”

=== Flora ===
At the muddy lake shores, plant species including Bog Stitchwort (Stellaria alsine), Brooklime (Veronica beccabunga), Water-plantain (Alisma plantago-aquatica), Bottle Sedge (Carex rostrata), the moss Climacium dendroides and Soft Rush (Juncus effusus) occur.

Zones of quaking scraw (or floating) vegetation occur along both ends of the lake and on the south-eastern shores, including Bogbean (Menyanthes trifoliata), Common Marsh-bedstraw (Galium palustre), Common Sedge (Carex nigra), Common Spotted-orchid (Dactylorhiza fuchsii), Cuckooflower (Cardamine pratensis), Marsh Cinquefoil (Potentilla palustris), Marsh Speedwell (Veronica scutellata), Sharp-flowered Rush (Juncus acutiflorus), and Water Horsetail (Equisetum fluviatile). Mosses such as Rhytidiadelphus squarrosus and Sphagnum squarrosum have been recorded here. Bulrush (Typha latifolia) and Willow (Salix spp.) scrub are noted in this area.

Water-starwort (Callitriche spp.) and Water-crowfoot (Ranunculus spp.) occur in deeper lake waters. Floating plants such as Common Duckweed (Lemna minor) and the liverwort Riccia fluitans occur in sheltered areas of the lake.

Bog plants, such as Bog Asphodel (Narthecium ossifragum), Cross-leaved Heath (Erica tetralix), Heath Wood-rush (Luzula multiflora), Heather (Calluna vulgaris), Hare's-tail Cottongrass (Eriophorum vaginatum) and Tormentil (Potentilla erecta), are noted at the north-east side of the SAC. In this area, mosses such as Sphagnum palustre, Sphagnum capillifolium, Sphagnum subnitens, Hypnum cupressiforme, Polytrichum commune and Dicranum scoparium, have been recorded, as has the lichen Cladonia portentosa.

=== Fauna ===
The Red Bog Special Area of Conservation is considered to be of importance with regard to bird species. Species such as coot (Fulica atra), mallard (Anas platyrhynchos), moorhen (Gallinula chloropus), mute swan (Cygnus olor), snipe (Gallinago gallinago), lapwing (Vanellus vanellus) and tufted duck (Aythya fuligula) occur here, and at the time of creating the site synopsis, over 20 pairs of black-headed gull (Larus ridibundus or Chroicocephalus ridibundus) were recorded at the site. The BISE webpage for the Red Bog site notes this species status at the site as 'reproducing', with a minimum population of 1 and maximum of 20 individuals.

== Conservation objectives ==
The conservation objectives for the Red Bog site were published in 2019. Targets of interest include maintenance of a permanently high water level all year round, maintenance of topography and water flow patterns, maintenance of water quality, maintenance of adequate cover and variety of vegetation communities, and monitoring of negative indicator species such as Heather (ling) and Birch (Betula).

=== Threats ===
Threats to this SAC include gravel extraction, as well as drainage and eutrophication of the wetland from agricultural activities in the surrounding areas.
