= Ballyman Glen =

Ecological site in County Dublin and County Wicklow, Ireland

- Gleann Bhaile Mhaine
- Location within Ireland
- Location: County Dublin and County Wicklow, Ireland
- Nearest city: Bray, County Wicklow
- Coordinates: 53°12′12″N 6°09′25″W
- Area: 23.53 hectares (58.1 acres)
- Governing body: National Parks and Wildlife Service

The Ballyman Glen (Irish: Gleann Bhaile Mhaine) Special Area of Conservation or SAC is a Natura 2000 site in County Wicklow and County Dublin, close to the town of Bray, County Wicklow in County Wicklow, Ireland. It qualifies as an SAC due to the presence of two ecological habitat types - petrifying springs with tufa formation (Cratoneurion) and alkaline fens.

== Location ==
Ballyman Glen SAC, a site of 23.53 hectares, is situated on the border between counties Dublin and Wicklow, including the townlands Ballyman and Phrompstown in County Dublin and Fassaroe and Monastery in County Wicklow, close to the towns of Bray, County Wicklow and Enniskerry in County Wicklow

== SAC qualification ==
The site was proposed as a Site of Community Importance in 1997 and designated as an SAC in 2019. The two key ecological features for which it was designated are:

- petrifying springs with tufa formation (an Annex I priority habitat)
- alkaline fens.

The area of alkaline fens includes petrifying springs and seepage areas. The petrifying springs at this site (one of twenty such SACs in Ireland) are found along the slopes of Ballyman Glen and along the edges of Ballyman stream. Cascade tufa deposits occur along the riverbanks. An underlying shallow groundwater system in the sand and gravel aquifer is the source of the springs. The springs at Ballyman Glen fall into the category of 'Carex lepidocarpa Small Sedge Springs’, in the categorisation system for differentiating petrifying springs by plant community. The flora at this site includes twenty species of sedge, such as the scarce long-stalked yellow-sedge (Carex lepidocarpa), greater tussock-sedge (Carex paniculata), Carex panicea, Carex flacca, Eleocharis quinqueflora, and broad-leaved cottongrass (Eriophorum latifolium). Fescues (Festuca rubra, tall fescue (Festuca arundinacea) rushes (Juncus articulatus, black bog-rush (Schoenus nigricans) and butterworts (Pinguicula vulgaris and Pinguicula lusitanica) occur here. It is rich in orchid species, with records of narrow-leaved marsh-orchid (D. traunsteineri) (one of two sites in County Wicklow for this species), early marsh-orchid (Dactylorhiza incarnata), and marsh helleborine (Epipactis palustris). Bryophytes (mosses) occurring at the fen include curled hookmoss (Cratoneuron commutatum) and fern-leaved hookmoss (Cratoneuron filicinum)

=== Conservation risks ===
The fen is adjacent to a landfill site for domestic refuse, and the area has been used for a clay pigeon shoot, with the debris of such shoots to be found there.

== History ==
The original name of Ballyman Glen was Glen Munire, Sillan Glinne Munire or Glenmunare, and has also been known as Ballymanny and Glenmonder. There is a church on the site (potentially 13th century) and archaeological excavations on the site have shown evidence of burials from the Bronze Age.

Ballyman Glen is mentioned in a song described in Croker’s ‘Popular songs of Ireland’ named "A Description of a Fox Chase that happened in the County of Dublin with the Earl of Meath's Hounds." Ballyman Glen is described as “A wild romantic glen, through which flows Ferrily's Brook, which here separates the counties of Dublin and Wicklow, watering the valley of Diamonds, till it is lost in the Bray river. Reynard's retreats are still to be seen in this glen.”
