= Sheheree Bog =

Raised bog

- Interactive map of Sheheree Bog
- Location: County Kerry, Ireland
- Coordinates: 52°02′24″N 9°28′52″W
- Area: 22 acres (0.089 km^{2})
- Governing body: National Parks and Wildlife Service

Sheheree Bog is a raised bog and national nature reserve of approximately 22 acres (0.089 km^{2}) in County Kerry.

== Features ==
Sheheree Bog was legally protected as a national nature reserve by the Irish government in 1990. It is also a Special Area of Conservation. The designation of Sheheree Bog with 18 other bogs as SACs led to a ban on turf cutting, which was a controversial decision in Ireland at the time.

Sheheree Bog is the only raised bog in the Killarney area, with a well-developed marginal drainage system, also known as a lagg, which is rare in Ireland. The slender cotton grass, a protected plant species, is found on the reserve. The comparative studies between Sheheree Bog and other Killarney or Owenreagh valley intermediate and blanket bogs is considered to be very valuable. The Bog is classed as degraded, but capable of regeneration.
