= Ballyteigue Burrow =

Nature reserve in County Wexford, Ireland

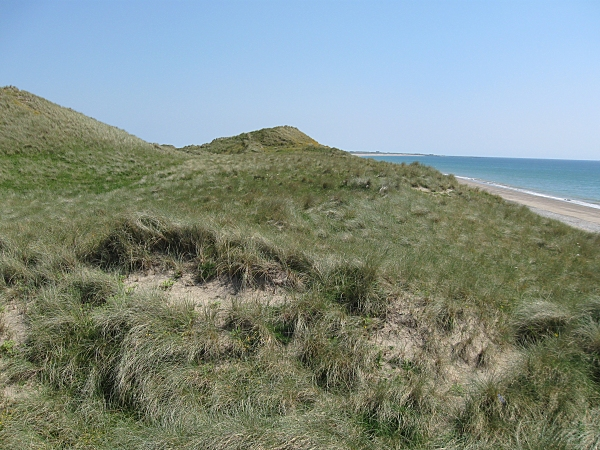
- The highest dune (14m) at Ballyteige Beach
- Interactive map of Ballyteigue Burrow
- Location: County Wexford, Ireland
- Coordinates: 52°12′36″N 6°39′32″W
- Area: 561 acres (2.27 km^{2})
- Governing body: National Parks and Wildlife Service

Ballyteigue Burrow is a series of coastal habitats of international importance, and national nature reserve of approximately 561 acres (2.27 km^{2}) in County Wexford, Ireland. It is also a Special Area of Conservation.

== Features ==
Ballyteigue Burrow was legally protected as a national nature reserve by the Irish government in 1987. The site has also been designated a Special Area of Conservation. The site has been assessed as being of international importance due to the variety of physical features including dune slacks, salt marshes, sand dunes, and mudflats. The name "burrow" is in reference to the large number of rabbits that were bred on the site from Norman times. There is still a large population of Oryctolagus cuniculus, the European rabbit, on the reserve which rises and falls due to the presence of the disease myxomatosis.

Four protected plant species have been recorded in Ballyteigue Burrow: lesser centaury, wild asparagus, Borrer's saltmarsh grass, and perennial glasswort. It is the main location in Ireland for perennial glasswort, and the only location in Ireland in which the rare lichen Fulgensia fulgens is found. Other plants found in the reserve include wild thyme, birds-foot trefoil, common centaury, kidney vetch, restharrow, spring vetch, sea pea, and henbane. Further inland from the coast, the soil is acidic with marram grass as the key species of the sand dunes. Other lichen recorded at the site include Usnea articulata and the moss Tortula ruraliformis.

The sand dunes create a warm environment for wasps, ants and bees, including the endangered great yellow bumble bee and the shrill carder bee, as well as moths and butterflies such as the dark green fritillary and small heath. Small numbers of the rare pale pill woodlouse Armadillidium album have been recorded on the reserve, along with the common lizard Lacerta vivipara, whose numbers have been declining.

The area close to the estuary offers overwintering habitats for a number of important birds including pale-bellied Brent geese, lapwings, black-tailed godwits, and golden plovers. The mudflats are home to a variety of waders, swans and ducks. Other birds that inhabit the reserve include linnets, little terns, meadow pipits, reed buntings, skylarks, stonechats, wheatears, and wrens.
