= Annaghmore Lough =

Lake in County Roscommon, Ireland

- Loch an Eanaigh Mhóir (Irish)
- Location in Ireland
- Location: County Roscommon
- Coordinates: 53°48′2″N 8°9′29″W
- Primary inflows: Scramogue River
- Catchment area: 3.96 km^{2} (1.5 sq mi)
- Basin countries: Ireland
- Max. length: 1.3 km (0.8 mi)
- Max. width: 0.7 km (0.4 mi)
- Surface area: 0.53 km^{2} (0.20 sq mi)
- Max. depth: 16 m (52 ft)
- Surface elevation: 46 m (151 ft)

Annaghmore Lough (Irish: Loch an Eanaigh Mhóir, meaning 'lake of the big marsh') is a freshwater lake in the west of Ireland. It is located in County Roscommon in the catchment of the upper River Shannon.

== Geography ==
Annaghmore Lough is located about 5 km (3 mi) northwest of Strokestown. It lies at the centre of a group of small glacial lakes.

== Natural history ==
A survey in 2008 found six fish species in Annaghmore Lough including perch, roach, rudd, pike, tench, three-spined stickleback and the critically endangered European eel.

Annaghmore Lough is an important bird sanctuary. Threatened species present here include whooper swan and golden plover. Other species include teal, shoveler, wigeon, mallard, pochard, goldeneye, lapwing and curlew. The lake and surrounding fens form the Annaghmore Lough (Roscommon) Special Area of Conservation.

The lake has marginal vegetation around its shores. Common club-rush grows on the lakeward side of the reed beds. There are substantial areas of alkaline fen along the shoreline, dominated by black bog-rush. In association with this fen is wet base-rich grassland, created by winter flooding, where the common butterwort predominates. A number of orchid species have been recorded here, including early marsh orchid and fragrant orchid. A number of uncommon plant species occur in the fen and the surrounding wet meadows. The site also has a small area of limestone pavement and an old cut bog, adding to plant species diversity. Invertebrates include two populations of the rare whorl snail Vertigo geyeri, a species in Europe which is listed on Annex II of the E.U. Habitats Directive.

== See also ==
- List of loughs in Ireland
- List of Special Areas of Conservation in the Republic of Ireland
