= Ballymacegan =

- Townland
- Location in Ireland
- Coordinates: 53°07′46″N 8°08′21″W
- Country: Ireland
- County: County Tipperary
- Parish: Lorrha

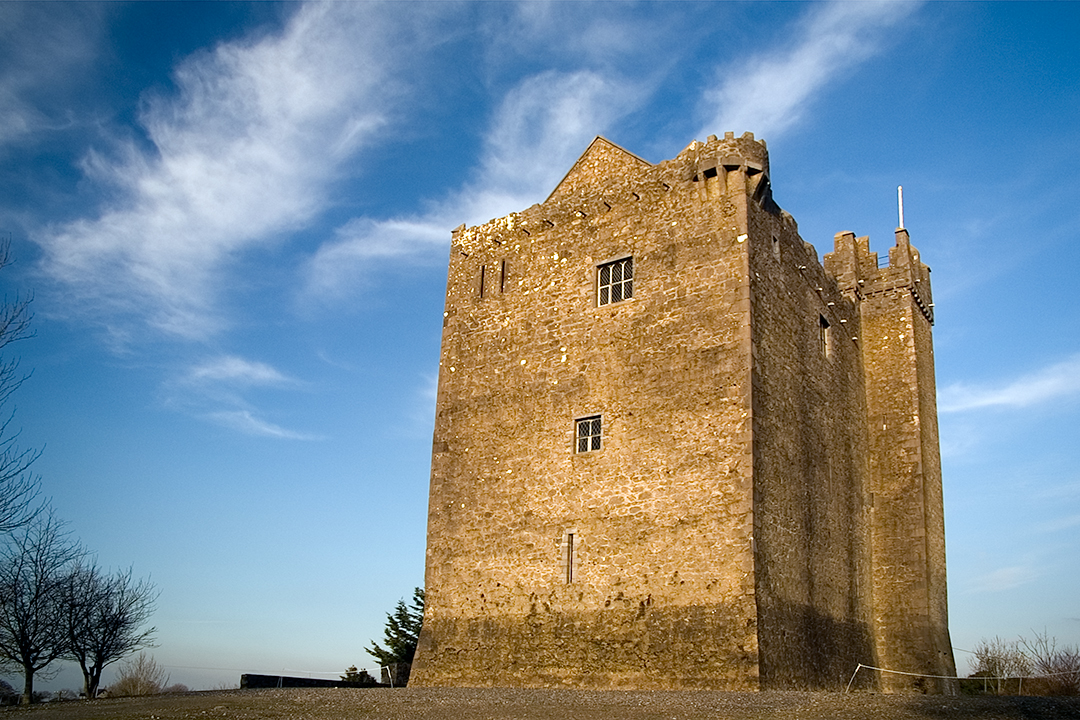
Redwood Castle, County Tipperary

Ballymacegan (Baile Mhic Aogáin in Irish) is a townland in the historical Barony of Ormond Lower, County Tipperary, Ireland. It is located in the civil parish of Lorrha in the north of the county and includes an area of callows alongside the River Shannon.

== Redwood Castle ==
Redwood Castle, a restored Norman castle with a Sheela na gig. is located overlooking the callows.
