= Ballyea North =

Ballyea North Baile Uí Aodha Thuaidh
- Townland
- Location in Ireland
- Coordinates: 52°48′28″N 8°23′06″W
- Country: Ireland
- County: County Tipperary
- Parish: Templeachally

Ballyea North (Baile Uí Aodha Thuaidh in Irish) is a townland in the historical Barony of Owney and Arra, County Tipperary, Ireland. It is located in the civil parish of Templeachally between Ballina, County Tipperary and the M7 motorway.
