= Ballyea, County Tipperary =

Ballyea, County Tipperary Baile Uí Aodha
- Townland
- Location in Ireland
- Coordinates: 52°19′46″N 7°56′52″W
- Country: Ireland
- County: County Tipperary
- Parish: Tubbrid

Ballyea, South Tipperary (Baile Uí Aodha in Irish) is a townland in the historical Barony of Iffa and Offa West, County Tipperary, Ireland. It is located in the civil parish of Tubbrid to the south of Cahir. It shares its English-language name with another townland, Bhaile Aodha, in the extreme north of the county.
