= Ross Lake (Ireland) =

Freshwater lake in the west of Ireland

- Loch an Rois (Irish)
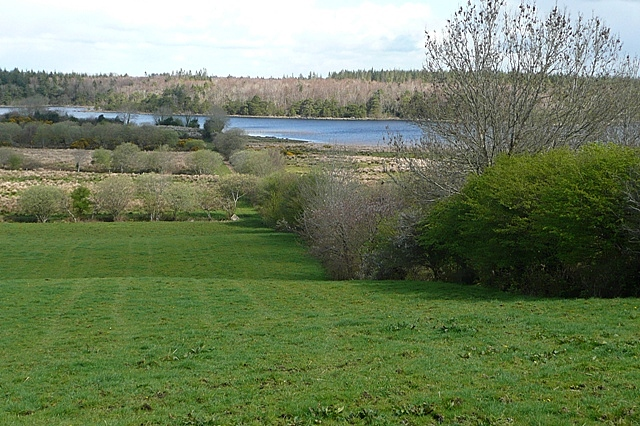

- Location in Ireland
- Location: County Galway
- Coordinates: 53°22′11″N 9°12′20″W
- Catchment area: 53.81 km^{2} (20.8 sq mi)
- Basin countries: Ireland
- Max. length: 3.1 km (1.9 mi)
- Max. width: 1.3 km (0.8 mi)
- Surface area: 1.39 km^{2} (0.54 sq mi)
- Average depth: 4 m (13 ft)
- Max. depth: 14 m (46 ft)
- Surface elevation: 6 m (20 ft)

Ross Lake (Irish: Loch an Rois) is a freshwater lake in the west of Ireland. It is part of the Lough Corrib catchment in County Galway.

== Geography ==
Ross Lake measures about 3 km (1.9 mi) long and 1 km (0.6 mi) wide. It is located about 15 km (9 mi) northwest of Galway city, near the village of Moycullen.

== Natural history ==
Fish species in Ross Lake include perch, roach, bream, pike and the critically endangered European eel. The lake is part of the Ross Lake and Woods Special Area of Conservation.

== See also ==
- List of loughs in Ireland
