= Ballyea South =

Townland in County Tipperary, Ireland

Coordinates: 52°48′N 8°23′W

Ballyea South (Baile Uí Aodha Theas in Irish) is a townland in the historical Barony of Owney and Arra, County Tipperary, Ireland. It is located in the civil parish of Templeachally between Ballina and the M7 motorway.
