= Ballyea, Dorrha =

Ballyea, Dorrha Baile Aodha
- Townland
- Location in Ireland
- Coordinates: 53°08′35″N 8°03′57″W
- Country: Ireland
- County: County Tipperary
- Parish: Dorrha

Ballyea, Dorrha (Baile Aodha in Irish) is a townland in the historical Barony of Ormond Lower, County Tipperary, Ireland. It is located in the civil parish of Dorrha at the extreme north of the county bordering County Offaly. It shares its English language name with another townland, Bhaile Uí Aodha, to the south of Cahir.
