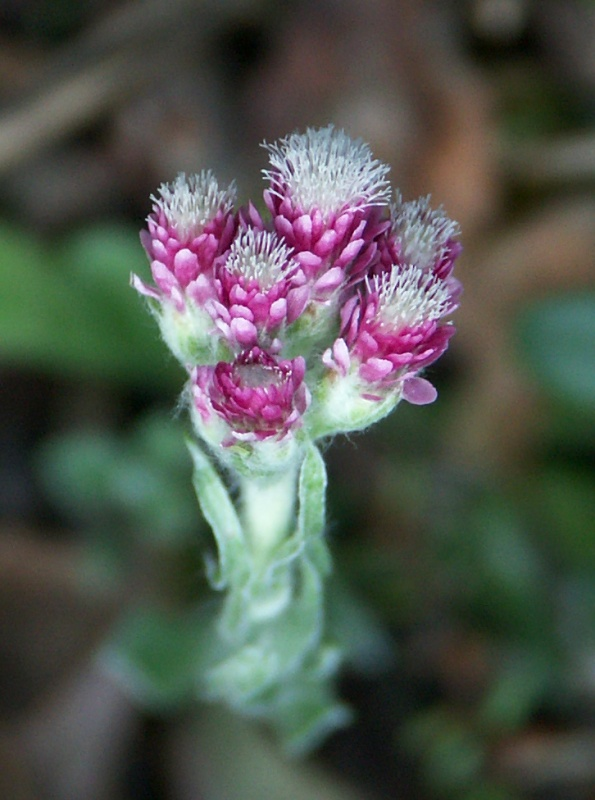

Conservation status
- Secure (NatureServe)

Scientific classification
- Kingdom: Plantae
- Clade: Embryophytes
- Clade: Tracheophytes
- Clade: Spermatophytes
- Clade: Angiosperms
- Clade: Eudicots
- Clade: Asterids
- Order: Asterales
- Family: Asteraceae
- Genus: Antennaria
- Species: A. dioica

Binomial name
- Antennaria dioica (L.) Gaertn.

Synonyms
- Synonymy: Antennaria hibernica Braun-Blanq.; Antennaria hyperborea D.Don; Antennaria insularis Greene; Antennaria montana Gray; Chamaezelum dioicum Link; Cyttarium dioicum Peterm.; Gnaphalium alpinum Asso ex DC.; Gnaphalium boreale Turcz. ex DC.; Gnaphalium dioica L.; Gnaphalium dioicum L.; Gnaphalium hyberboreum Winch ex DC.; Gnaphalium pes-cati Garsault

= Antennaria dioica =

Species of flowering plant

Antennaria dioica (mountain everlasting, stoloniferous pussytoes, catsfoot or cudweed) is a Eurasian species of flowering plant in the family Asteraceae. It is a perennial herb found in cool northern and mountainous regions of Europe and northern Asia (Russia, Mongolia, Japan, Kazakhstan, China (Xinjiang, Heilongjiang, Gansu) and the Aleutian Islands of Alaska.

== Description ==
Antennaria dioica is an evergreen, herbaceous perennial plant growing to 10–20 cm tall, with a rosette of basal spoon-shaped leaves 4 cm long, and 1 cm broad at their broadest near the apex; and smaller leaves arranged spirally up the flowering stems. The flowers are produced in capitula (flowerheads) 6–12 mm diameter with pale pink ray florets and darker pink disc florets. The plant's common name is derived from the flower clusters which are thought to resemble the pads or toes of a cat's paw.

It is dioecious, but can also reproduce without fertilisation. It is found in groups which can be all-female colonies, all-male colonies, and also mixed colonies. The male plants have whiter flower heads than female plants. The species name, dioica, is derived from Greek as reference to the separate male and female plants. Its common habitats include mountain grasslands, dry pastures and woodland edges.

== Uses ==
While not widely used in herbal medicine, the plant was believed to have antitussive, astringent, diuretic and emollient properties. It has been traditionally used to treat bronchitis, liver and gall bladder complaints, hepatitis and diarrhea. Externally, it has been used as a gargle for treating tonsillitis and as a douche for vaginitis.

John Gerard's Herball (1597) describes the plant: "When the flower hath long flourished and is waxen old, then comes there in the middest of the floure a certain brown yellow thrumme, such as is in the middest of the daisie, which floure being gathered when it is young may be kept in such manner (I meane in such freshness and well-liking) by the space of a whole year after in your chest or elsewhere, wherefore our English women have called it 'Live Long,' or 'Live-for ever,' which name doth aptly answer this effects."

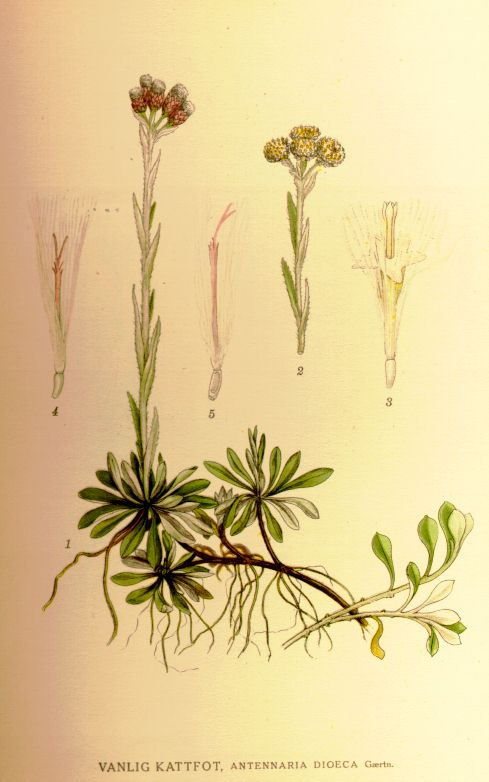
