= Shannon Callows =

Low lying areas between Athlone and Portumna, Ireland

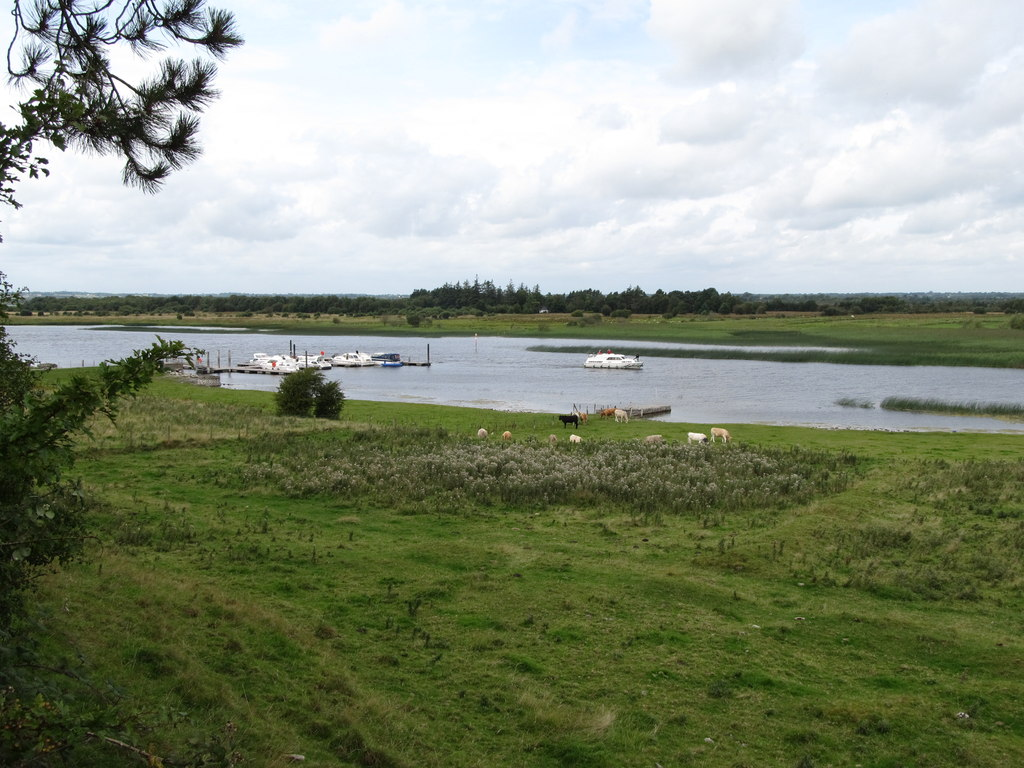
Callows at Clonmacnoise

The Shannon Callows (Irish: Caladh na Sionainne) are areas of flat land along the shores of the River Shannon. These areas lie between Athlone in County Westmeath, where the river flows out of Lough Ree, and Portumna in County Galway, where it enters Lough Derg, in central Ireland. The shallow grade of the river here results in occasional flooding of the callows.

== Etymology ==
The Hiberno-English word "callow" is an anglicisation of the Irish word caladh, which means "flood-meadow".

== Protection ==
The Shannon Callows are a classified as a Special Area of Conservation (SAC). The Irish Wildlife Trust has a "callow reserve" on Bullock Island in County Offaly. The SAC covers an area of 59 square kilometres (23 sq mi).

== Wildlife ==
The Shannon Callows are subject to protection owing to the many species of birds occurring on the site. Recorded are, amongst others, black-tailed godwit, corncrake, curlew, golden plover, lapwing, mute swan, redshank, common sandpiper, whooper swan and wigeon. Mammals recorded include American mink, fox and otter. Grazing of cattle keeps alder and willow from spreading. Sections of callow at higher elevation and therefore less prone to flooding have a greater diversity of plants, in particular clover, creeping buttercup, cuckoo flower, marsh bedstraw, marsh marigold, meadow grass, meadowsweet, sedge and water mint.

The area was one of the most important breeding areas for corncrakes in Ireland and the local farmers supported a project to mow the callows later in the summer to give the birds the chance to rear a second brood. However, the early summer flooding which became predominant stopped the corncrakes breeding at all, the corncrake being said to be the first bird to be extirpated from Shannon system due to climate change. The area also supports 80% of the Irish population of whinchat.
