= Department of Housing, Local Government and Heritage =

Irish government department

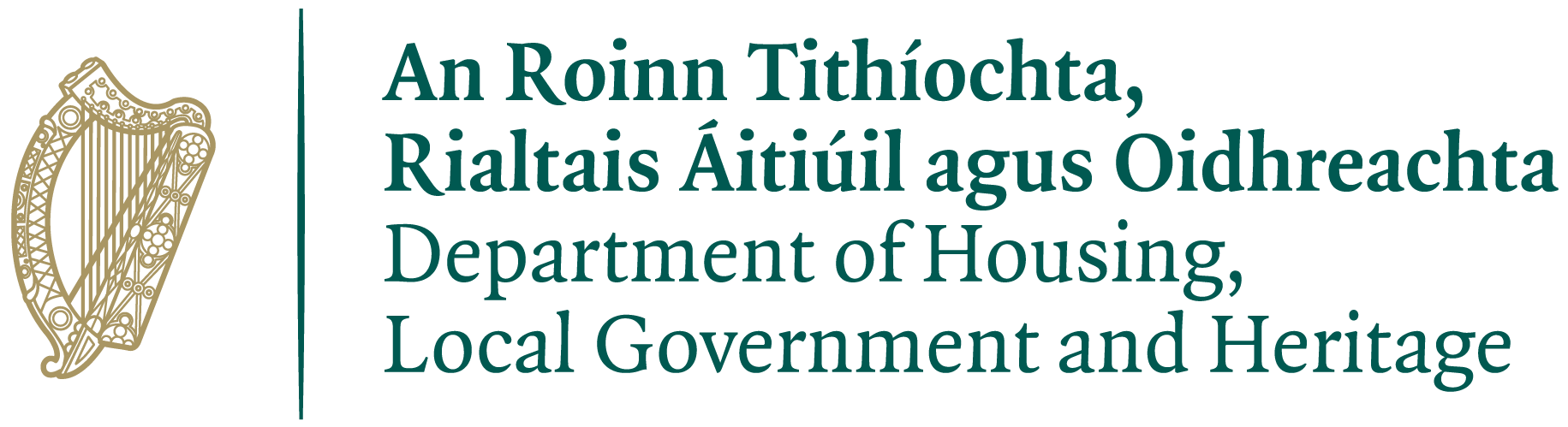

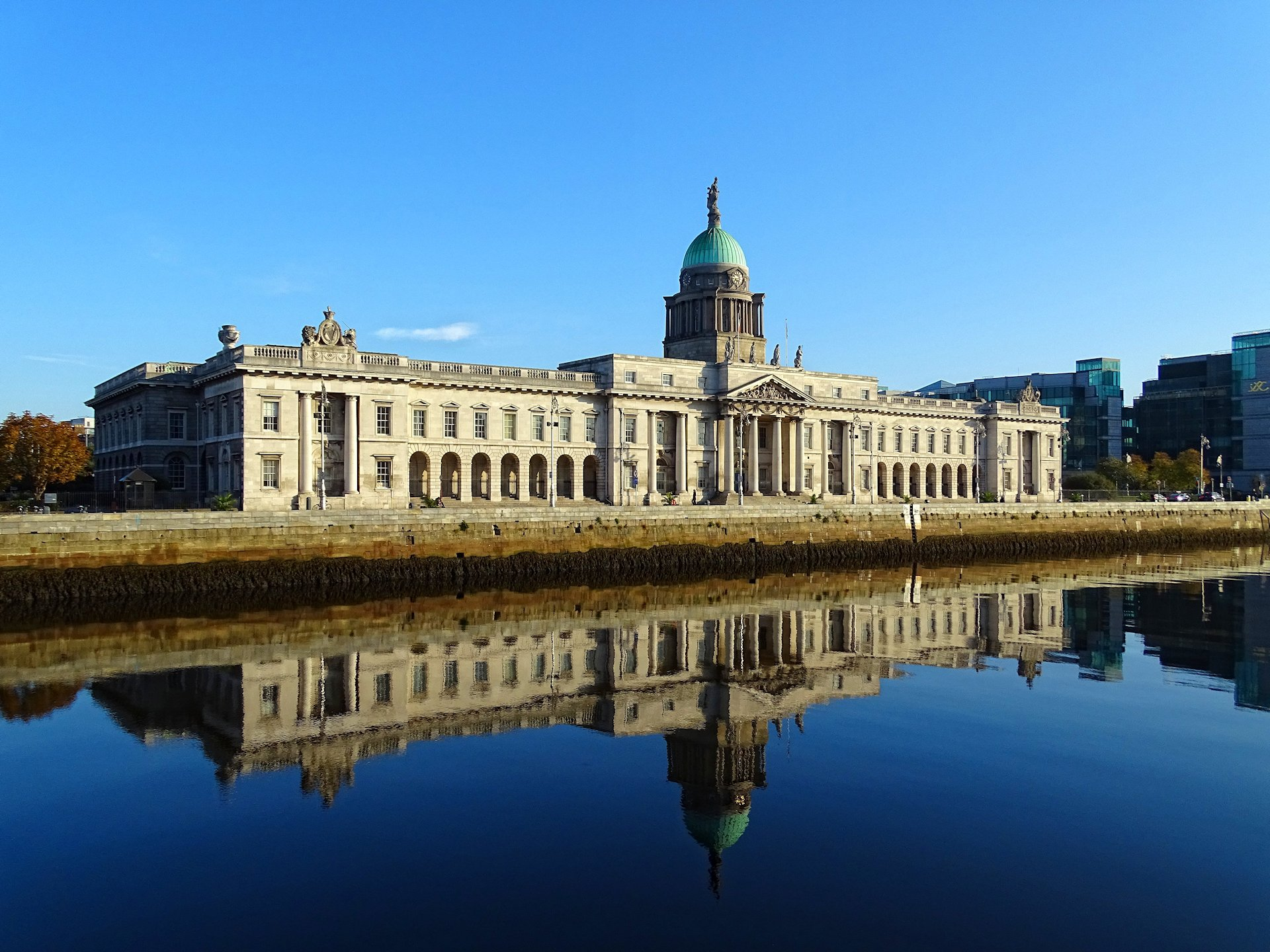
- Custom House, Dublin

Department overview
- Formed: 2 April 1919
- Superseding Department: Local Government Board for Ireland
- Jurisdiction: Government of Ireland
- Headquarters: Custom House, Dublin; 53°20′54″N 6°15′12″W
- Minister responsible: James Browne, Minister for Housing, Local Government and Heritage
- Department executive: Graham Doyle, Secretary General
- Website: Official website

The Department of Housing, Local Government and Heritage (Irish: An Roinn Tithíochta, Rialtais Áitiúil agus Oidhreachta) is a department of the Government of Ireland. It is led by the Minister for Housing, Local Government and Heritage.

== Departmental team ==
The departmental team consists of the following:

- Minister for Housing, Local Government and Heritage: James Browne, TD
  - Minister of State at the Department of Housing, Local Government and Heritage with special responsibility for local government and planning: John Cummins, TD
  - Minister of State at the Department of Housing, Local Government and Heritage with special responsibility for nature, heritage and biodiversity: Christopher O'Sullivan, TD
  - Minister of State at the Department of Housing, Local Government and Heritage with special responsibility for housing: Kieran O'Donnell, TD
- Secretary General of the Department: Graham Doyle

== Overview ==
The headquarters and ministerial offices of the department are in the Custom House, Dublin 1. The department also has offices in Wexford and Ballina, County Mayo, with the headquarters of Met Éireann, the weather forecasting service, in Glasnevin, Dublin.

The department has the following divisions:

- Local government
- Housing policy and standards
- Heritage
  - National Built Heritage Service
  - National Monuments Service
  - National Parks and Wildlife Service
- Met Éireann
- Local government audit service
- Affordable housing
- Corporate and business support
- Water
- Planning
- Homelessness, rental and social inclusion
- Social housing delivery

Through its local government functions, it is responsible for the conduct of elections and referendums.

=== Heritage functions ===
The National Parks and Wildlife Service (NPWS) manages the State's nature conservation responsibilities. As well as managing the national parks, the activities of the NPWS include the designation and protection of Natural Heritage Areas, Special Areas of Conservation and Special Protection Areas. The NPWS was established as part of the department after the abolition of Dúchas in 2003. Dúchas's responsibilities had included the management of Ireland's six national parks and wildlife.

The National Monuments Service maintains Ireland's national monuments and the Archaeological Survey of Ireland.

The National Built Heritage Service maintains the National Inventory of Architectural Heritage.

== Aegis bodies ==
The following bodies are under the aegis of the department:

- An Coimisiún Pleanála
- An Fóram Uisce
- Approved Housing Bodies Regulatory Authority (AHBRA)
- Docklands Oversight and Consultative Forum
- Electoral Commission
- Gas Networks Ireland
- Heritage Council
- Housing Agency
- Housing Finance Agency
- Land Development Agency
- Local Government Management Agency
- National Oversight and Audit Commission
- National Traveller Accommodation Consultative Committee
- Pyrite Resolution Board
- Residential Tenancies Board
- Property Services Regulatory Authority
- Property Services Appeal Board
- Tailte Éireann, an agency for surveying, registering ownership, and valuing land.
- Uisce Éireann, formerly Irish Water, state-owned water utility
- Valuation Tribunal
- Waterways Ireland

== History ==
In the Ministry of Dáil Éireann in the Irish Republic (1919–1922), a Ministry of Local Government was established on 2 April 1919. In the Irish Free State, there was a Minister for Local Government as part of the first Executive Council of the Irish Free State established in 1922. The Department of Local Government and Public Health was given a statutory basis by the Ministers and Secretaries Act 1924. This act provided it with:

the administration and business generally of public services in connection with local government, public health, relief of the poor, care of the insane (including insane criminals), health insurance, elections to each House of the Oireachtas, elections to local bodies and authorities, registration of voters, maintenance of public roads, and highways, registration of births, deaths and marriages, and vital statistics and all powers, duties and functions connected with the same, and shall include in particular the business, powers, duties and functions of the branches and officers of the public service specified in the Third Part of the Schedule to this Act, and of which Department the head shall be, and shall be styled, an t-Aire Rialtais Aitiúla agus Sláinte Puiblí or (in English) the Minister for Local Government and Public Health.

It also assigned it with the following branches of administration:

- The Local Government Board for Ireland, including appeals under the Old Age Pensions Acts.
- The Inspectors of Lunatic Asylums in Ireland.
- National Health Insurance Commission.
- The Registrar-General of Births, Deaths and Marriages in Ireland.
- Roads Department (formerly Ministry of Transport).
- Clerk of the Crown and Hanaper so far as concerned with Elections.
- General Nursing Council and Central Midwives Board.

Over the years the name and functions of the department have changed several times.

=== Alteration of name and transfer of functions ===
Date	Effect
2 June 1924	Establishment of the Department of Local Government and Public Health
22 January 1947	Renamed as the Department of Local Government
18 March 1947	Transfer of Health to the Department of Health
10 October 1947	Transfer of Social Welfare to the Department of Social Welfare
14 June 1954	Allocation of Oifig na Gaeltachta agus na gCeantar gCúng
30 November 1956	Transfer of Oifig na Gaeltachta agus na gCeantar gCúng to Department of the Gaeltacht
17 August 1977	Renamed as the Department of the Environment
22 July 1997	Renamed as the Department of the Environment and Local Government
18 June 2002	Transfer of Roads to the Department of the Public Enterprise
10 July 2002	Transfer of Heritage from the Department of Community, Rural and Gaeltacht Affairs
10 June 2003	Renamed as the Department of the Environment, Heritage and Local Government
15 January 2010	Transfer of Foreshore to the Department of Agriculture, Fisheries and Food
1 May 2011	Transfer of Heritage to the Department of Tourism, Culture and Sport
1 May 2011	Transfer of Community from the Department of Community, Equality and Gaeltacht Affairs
2 May 2011	Renamed as the Department of the Environment, Community and Local Government
22 July 2016	Transfer of Environment to the Department of Communications, Energy and Natural Resources
23 July 2016	Renamed as the Department of Housing, Planning, Community and Local Government
27 July 2017	Transfer of Community Development to Department of Rural and Community Development
1 August 2017	Renamed as the Department of Housing, Planning and Local Government
1 January 2018	Transfer of Ordnance Survey Ireland from the Department of Justice and Equality
1 January 2018	Transfer of the Property Registration Authority from the Department of Justice and Equality
1 January 2018	Transfer of the Valuation Office from the Department of Justice and Equality
1 January 2018	Transfer of Motor Tax to the Department of Transport, Tourism and Sport
1 June 2018	Transfer of Water Safety to the Department of Rural and Community Development
9 September 2020	Transfer of Heritage from the Department of Culture, Heritage and the Gaeltacht
9 September 2020	Transfer of Inland Waterways from the Department of Culture, Heritage and the Gaeltacht
30 September 2020	Renamed as the Department of Housing, Local Government and Heritage
1 August 2025	Transfer of Marine environment to the Department of Climate, Energy and the Environment
1 August 2025	Transfer of Dog breeding to the Department of Agriculture, Food and the Marine
1 August 2025	Transfer of Property Services from the Department of Justice, Home Affairs and Migration
