= Ardgraigue Bog =

Ecological site in County Galway, Ireland

- Portach na hArdghráige
- Location within Ireland
- Location: County Galway, Ireland
- Nearest city: Portumna, County Galway
- Coordinates: 53°10′24″N 8°14′28″W
- Area: 177.11 ha (437.6 acres)
- Established: 2021
- Governing body: National Parks and Wildlife Service

The Ardgraigue Bog (Irish: Portach na hArdghráige) Special Area of Conservation or SAC is a Natura 2000 site in County Galway, close to the town of Portumna in County Galway, Ireland. The site qualifies for Special Area of Conservation status under three criteria: the presence of active raised bog, of degraded raised bogs still capable of natural regeneration, and of depressions on peat substrates of the Rhynchosporion.

== Location ==
The Ardgraigue Bog SAC is situated approximately 3 km north-east of the town of Killimor in County Galway, in the townlands of Ardgraigue, Kilquain, Woodfield, and Lissaniska North and South. Schedule 1 of the Statutory Instrument for this site (S.I. No. 655/2021) identifies it as encompassing an area of 177.11 hectares. The National Parks and Wildlife Service Conservation Objectives for Ardgraigue Bog SAC includes a detailed map of the site.

=== Placename ===
The entry for Ardgraigue in the Irish Placenames of Ireland website Logainm.ie gives the Irish name An Ardghráig. The glossary for that entry indicates the word ‘gráig’ may correspond to a hamlet or cattlesteading. The first part of the name ‘Ard’ corresponds to ‘height’ or ‘high.’

== Special Area of Conservation qualification ==
Ireland is legally required to designate a range of species and habitats under the European Union Habitats Directive 92/43/EEC and the Irish regulations which implement this Directive (European Communities (Birds and Natural Habitats) Regulations 2011 (S.I. No. 477 of 2011). Approximately 13,500 km^{2} have been designated as SACs (including land, lakes and marine habitats) in Ireland. Protected areas such as SACs are investigated, designated and managed by the Irish National Parks and Wildlife Service (NPWS). Active raised bogs are an Annex I priority habitat under the Habitats Directive – priority I habitats are those which are seriously threatened and considered to be in danger of extinction. “Ireland has a particular responsibility for the conservation and restoration of ARB, as it is estimated to hold approximately half of the Atlantic biogeographic region’s resource of the habitat.” According to the 2019 EU report on the Status of EU Protected Habitats and Species in Ireland, the conservation status of active raised bogs, degraded raised bogs and ‘’Rhynchosporion’’ depressions in Ireland is considered to be ‘bad and deteriorating’.

Ardgraigue Bog was proposed as a Natura 2000 site (‘Site of Community Importance’ or SCI) in 2003 under the Habitats Directive. Statutory Instrument No. 655 of 2021, which established the site as an SAC (Site code: 002356), was passed in 2021. The site code for this SAC is 002356. The three key ecological features for which this site holds a Special Area of Conservation designation are:

- Active raised bogs (Annex I priority feature) [Natura 2000 code 7110]
- Degraded raised bogs still capable of natural regeneration [Natura 2000 code 7120]
- Depressions on peat substrates of the Rhynchosporion [Natura 2000 code 7150]

=== Other designations ===
In the 'Raised Bog Natural Heritage Area Project' of 2002 by Dúchas, the Heritage Service, the Ardgraigue Bog site was considered for inclusion as a Natural Heritage Area. The site holds proposed Natural Heritage Area (or pNHA) status in addition to its full SAC status. The pNHA site code for Ardgraigue Bog is 001224.

== Site features ==
The Ardgraigue Bog is 177.11 hectares in size, according to the Statutory instrument for the site designation. The National Parks and Wildlife Service Conservation Objectives document notes that the area of active raised bog at the site was 10.3 hectares and the area of degraded raised bog was 7.5 hectares, using data from the 'Fernanez report' of 2006. This small raised bog includes areas of both high bog and cutover bog. The NPWS Site Synopsis document describes the bog thus:

”This site consists of a small raised bog that developed in a basin. It is actively cut on all margins. It is described as being of excellent quality with a very wet quaking surface and soft margins. The vegetation is described as uniform throughout the bog. There are few pools on this site but it has very good hummock and hollow complexes. There is a small flush to the north of the high bog area. The bog does not appear to have been burnt in over 20 years and has a good lichen flora as a result”.

=== Active raised bogs ===
The active raised bog component of this SAC includes wet, actively peat-forming areas of high bog including a high percentage cover of Sphagnum bog moss species, and where topographic features such as hummocks, pools, wet flats, Sphagnum lawns, flushes and soaks are found.

Plant species occurring at the high bog are notes as typical of a Midlands Raised bog. These include bog-rosemary (Andromeda polifolia), cranberry (Vaccinium oxycoccos) and the bog moss Sphagnum magellanicum. Other plants occurring at this site include bogbean (Menyanthes trifoliata), common cottongrass (Eriophorum angustifolium), great sundew (Drosera anglica), round-leaved sundew (Drosera rotundifolia), heather (Calluna vulgaris), deergrass (Scirpus cespitosus), white beak-sedge and carnation sedge (Carex panicea).

A diverse range of bog mosses occur here in “hummocks” and “lawns” (topographic descriptions of raised and flat areas of the bog habitat). Species include Sphagnum fuscum, Sphagnum papillosum, Sphagnum imbricatum, Sphagnum capillifolium, Sphagnum subnitens and Sphagnum tenellum. The species Sphagnum pulchrum, Sphagnum cuspidatum and Sphagnum auriculatum occur in very good hummock/hollow complexes. Other moss species found at the Ardgraigue Bog site include Aulacomnium palustre, Campylopus atrovirens, Hypnum jutlandicum, Leucobryum glaucum and Pleurozium schreberi. The liverworts Pleurozia purpurea, Calypogeia sphagnicola, Cladopodiella fluitans, and Odontoschisma sphagni have been identified as growing here also.

Good colonies of lichens are to be found here, including such species as Cladonia ciliata, Cladonia arbuscula and Cladonia uncialis. To the north of the bog is a flush, where the prominent vegetation includes bog myrtle (Myrica gale), crowberry (Empetrum nigrum) and heather species. This area also includes bog rosemary, bilberry (Vaccinium myrtillus), common cow-wheat (Melampyrum pratense), cranberry (Vaccinium) and Sphagnum recurvum.

=== Degraded raised bogs still capable of natural regeneration ===
This type of habitat is an Annex I habitat, but not a priority habitat. A site can be considered a degraded raised bog still capable of natural degeneration when the ‘acrotelm’ (the actively peat-forming upper layer) of a raised bog is absent or patchy, but the bog capable of natural regeneration to active bog within 30 years if the hydrology is repaired.

=== Depressions on peat substrates of the Rhynchosporion ===
This type of habitat is an Annex I habitat when it occurs in the wettest areas of an active raised bog, but is not itself a priority habitat. It is an integral part of the active raised bog habitat and is described by the European Environment Agency as:

“Highly constant pioneer communities of humid exposed peat or, sometimes, sand, with Rhynchospora alba, Rhynchospora fusca, Drosera intermedia, Drosera rotundifolia, Lycopodiella inundata, forming on stripped areas of blanket bogs or raised bogs, but also on naturally seep- or frost-eroded areas of wet heaths and bogs, in flushes and in the fluctuation zone of oligotrophic pools with sandy, slightly peaty substratum.”

At Ardgraigue Bog, this habitat is found in wet depressions, pool edges and erosion channels. The type of flora found in the Rhynchosporion habitat includes species such as white beak-sedge (Rhynchospora alba), brown beak-sedge (Rhynchospora fusca), carnation sedge (Carex panicea), bog asphodel (Narthecium ossifragum), deergrass (Scirpus cespitosus) and sundew species (Drosera spp.).

== Site history ==
The first surveys of Irish bogs were carried out by the Irish Bog Commissioners in 1810–4 to investigate their value. An Foras Forbartha carried out the first ecological surveys in 1968–74. An Foras Taluntais undertook ecological surveys of Irish bogs in 1973–4. In 1980 the Plant Ecology Section of the Forest and Wildlife Service initiated an extensive research programme assessing the ecological status of over 25,000 hectares of Irish bogs considered for acquisition by the Irish government. Follow-up assessment of 25 of the Midland Raised Bogs assessed in the earlier surveys found that between 1971 and 1980, “24 sites (96%) have suffered complete or partial loss of their scientific interest and in 18 cases (72%) this loss is now irreversible”

The first ecological survey on Ardgraigue Bog was carried out in 1984, as described in an unpublished report for the Irish Forest and Wildlife Service by Douglas and Mooney. The results of the national surveys carried out between 1983 and 1987 by the Wildlife Service were collated into the Cross report (‘The raised bogs of Ireland – their ecology, status and conservation’), published in 1990. The survey work, updating the earlier surveys, revealed that Ireland now had no completely intact raised bogs, and that only 141 sites (or approximately 23,000 hectares) had ‘intact’ surfaces of scientific interest, of the 310,000 hectares in the original survey works. At the time of the report, only 763 hectares of bog (not including peripheral land) were protected as nature reserves.

An area of 80 hectares of the Ardgraigue Bog site was described as a “Category A True Midlands Raised Bog” in the Cross report, based on the data from the 1984 survey. In the Cross report, it is noted that Ardgraigue Bog was one of a number of sites on which significant development (or damage) was known to have occurred since the previous Wildlife Service survey. The report noted, in describing the effects of burning on wet bogs, that a reduction of the surface amplitude of the raised bog that had occurred at Ardgraigue was likely to have been due to the effects of fire. The bog was described as being “devoid of pools (A2 and A3 zones), but whose surface is dominated by Sphagnum pulchrum.” </ref name=Cross1990report> The Irish Peatland Conservation Council had, in 1987 compiled and published a list of 11 bogs which should be considered for conservation, including Ardgraigue Bog. The Cross report listed a number of bogs, including Ardgraigue Bog, which had been damaged since the commencement of the survey, and noted that “provision of grant aid for development under the 1981 Turf Development, Act greatly speeded up destruction of sites.” The report states that while this grant aid has since been discontinued, the finance provided under it had provided for the acquisition of drainage and cutting equipment so that further damage would be expected and “All remaining unprotected bogs must be considered therefore as being under imminent threat of destruction.” In the raised bog Natural Heritage Area Project of 2002 by Dúchas, the Heritage Service, the Ardgraigue Bog site was considered for inclusion as a Natural Heritage Area.

Under the European Union Habitats Directive, Ireland nominated 53 raised bog sites for designation as Special Areas of Conservation (SAC) between 1997 and 2003. Ardgraigue bog was one of the sites designated as an SAC in 2002, whereupon it was given candidate SAC status and status as a ‘European site’ and given the same legal protection as an SAC. Ardgraigue bog is listed as one of the sites of Community importance (SCI) adopted by the European Union under the Habitats Directive in 2004. This list was not considered complete at the time, as some Member States had not proposed sufficient sites for consideration, and the list would later expand to include additions from these States. It received full SAC status in 2021.

== Conservation objectives ==
In 2015, site-specific conservation objectives for Ardgraigue Bog were published by the National Parks and Wildlife Service. The objectives for the site are to restore the favourable conservation conditions for the active raised bogs at the site. The aim for the habitat type ‘Degraded raised bogs still capable of natural regeneration’ is to re-establish its peat-forming capacity. The presence of the habitat type ‘Depressions on peat substrates of the Rhynchosporion’ is a component of healthy raised bogs, so a separate conservation objective was not outlined for this habitat.

The long-term habitat area objective for the site is to restore the site to 24.3 hectares (subject to natural processes). The area of active raised bog was mapped in 2006 as 10.3 hectares and the area of degraded raised bog was mapped as 7.5 hectares, of which 5.2 hectares is likely to be restorable to active raised bog. A further 8.8 hectares of the cutover area was considered to be restorable. The area of high bog at the site in 2012 was 80.4 hectares and the conservation objectives note that this area should not be reduced. The distribution and variability of active raised bog (primarily in the central and north-western sections of the site) and degraded raised bog (primarily in the central and south-western sections of the site should be restored. Objectives are set for the hydrological regime at the site. The mean water levels at the site should be maintained at near or above the surface of the bog lawns for most of the year. High bog topography, flow directions, slopes and transitional areas should be restored. Regarding vegetation quality, 12.2 hectares of central ecotope/active flush/soaks/bog woodland should be restored, as should adequate Sphagnum cover and bog flora. Air and water quality at the site should be maintained, and total nitrogen deposition should not exceed 5 kg/ha/year.

The raised bog restoration plan (version 2) for Ardgraigue Bog SAC was published in March 2023. It describes the restoration measures required to achieve the site-specific conservation objectives for the site. The hydrological p;rocesses at the site are key to restoration of both the high bog and the cutover areas. Restoration measures outlined in the plan include blocking of high bog drains, blocking of drains on cutover bogs, removal of forestry or trees, installation of marginal dams, high bog excavation or reprofiling, inoculation with species of bog moss or Sphagnum and cell bunding on the high bog or cutover bog. Site management (including fire prevention and management, and litter fly-tipping management) is also included in the plan and the establishment of a fire prevention and control plan is one of the key actions of the plan.

Another key action is that the restoration plan and associated drainage management plan should be developed in partnership with stakeholders, in order to involve and provide reassurance to these stakeholders as to any risks to local agricultural and other land and to the risk of flooding after restoring the hydrological processes of the bog. Community benefits of site restoration will also be examined, such as developing socio-economic benefits (for example, recreation, education and tourism) and longer-term health and environmental benefits.

“Apart from immediate economic benefits, the restoration of raised bogs can provide many other benefits to the wider community, such as provision of clean water, flood attenuation and water flow regulation, preservation of archaeological artefacts and other sources of historical knowledge and, not least, helping Ireland reduce its national greenhouse gas emissions and, therefore, helping to combat climate change”

In June 2024, the Department of Housing, Local Government and Heritage published the determination on ‘Screening for Appropriate Assessment (AA)’ for Ardgraigue Bog to establish the impact of any of the measures outlined in the NPWS restoration plan. The assessment concluded that “the peatland restoration works at Ardgraigue Bog Special Area of Conservation are entirely comprised of activities that directly support the Conservation Objectives of this European site”

== Conservation threats ==
Peat-cutting is noted in the NPWS site synopsis as a significant threat to this Special Area of Conservation. “Current land use on the site consists of peat-cutting around most of the margins of the high bog. Areas of cutover have been reclaimed for agricultural purposes to the north of the site. Peat-cutting on the site appears to be domestic mechanised peat extraction. Damaging activities associated with these land uses include drainage around the high bog and burning of the high bog. These are all activities that have resulted in loss of habitat and damage to the hydrological status of the site, and pose a continuing threat to its viability.”

While peat-cutting was originally to be discontinued on all SAC sites on designation, a derogation of up to 10 years was granted by the Irish government, allowing for non-commercial turf-cutting on Ardgraigue Bog and many other designated raised bog candidate SAC and NHA sites. This derogation was not extended past the ten-year period, given the ongoing damage to these sites (at a rate of 2-4% per annum). For sites designated before 1999, the derogation ended at the end of 2008, and for sites designated after 1999 (including Ardgraigue Bog, designated in 2002) the derogation would end at the end of 2011. The Minister for the Environment John Gormley announced that the areas on which peat-cutting was no longer permitted amounted to less than 5% of the over 1,500 Irish bogs, and peat-cutting was still allowed on blanket bog sites.

The government implemented a compensation scheme to reduce the impact of the cessation of peat-cutting activities on the designated peatland sites. People with peat-cutting rights (or turbary rights) on these sites had the options of:

- an ‘Annual Payment Scheme’ (a payment of €1,500 per annum (index-linked) for 15 years and a once-off incentive payment of €500) further to the signing of a legal agreement with the relevant Minister,

or

- a ‘Bog Relocation Scheme’ (where qualifying applicants would be facilitated in relocating to non-designated sites to continue peat cutting)

While people who chose to avail of the Bog Relocation Scheme awaited the investigation and preparation of alternative peat-cutting sites, they had the option of either receiving the Annual Payment Scheme or receiving an annual supply of 15 tonnes of cut turf delivered to their homes. Peaceful protests were held at Ardgraigue Bog in 2013 regarding the peat-cutting ban at the site.

The Minister for Culture, Heritage and the Gaeltacht noted in Dáil Éireann (the lower house of the Irish legislature) in December 2019 that 22 applicants to the Turf Cutting Cessation Scheme for Ardgraigue Bog were regularly receiving payment under the Annual Payments Scheme, and that no applicant had applied for relocation. The 2017 Cessation of Turf Cutting Compensation Scheme dataset recorded 27 applications, none of which applied for relocation or required turf delivery.

In 2022, an investigation into peat-cutting activities on Irish SACs found that peat-cutting had continued without State sanction on many raised bog SACs since 2012. Figures published for Ardgraigue Bog showed that the numbers of plots cut were 27, 26, 25, 29, 24, 12, 16, 17, 24 and 22 for the years 2012, 2013, 2014, 2015, 2016, 2017, 2018, 2019, 2020 and 2021, respectively. Friends of the Irish Environment carried out aerial surveys of raised bog SACs in 2012 and demonstrated that peat-cutting was still being carried out, including on Ardgraigue Bog SAC. The continued cutting of peat at priority Natura 2000 designated SACs, as well as being a national issue of concern, has international implications. The European Commission issued a letter of formal notice in 2011 and an additional reasoned opinion to Ireland in 2022 on the issue of Ireland's failure to implement the Habitats Directive regarding raised and blanket bog habitats. In March 2024, Ireland was referred to the Court of Justice of the European Union (INFR(2010)2161) for insufficient progress on protecting raised and blanket bogs from peat-cutting. The European Commission noted that these habitats are “biodiversity hotspots playing host to important insect and bird species“ and that peat bogs are also vital carbon sinks when healthy.

== See also ==
- List of bogs
- List of Special Areas of Conservation in the Republic of Ireland
