= Carrownagappul Bog =

Ecological site in County Galway, Ireland

- Portach Cheathrú na gCapall
- Location within Ireland
- Location: County Galway, Ireland
- Nearest city: Mountbellew
- Coordinates: 53°30′00″N 8°29′51″W
- Area: 485.66 ha (1,200.1 acres)
- Established: 2017
- Governing body: National Parks and Wildlife Service

The Carrownagappul Bog (Irish: Portach Ceathrú na gCapall) Special Area of Conservation or SAC is a Natura 2000 site in County Galway, close to the town of Mountbellew in County Galway, Ireland. The site qualifies for Special Area of Conservation status under three criteria: the presence of active raised bog, of degraded raised bogs still capable of natural regeneration, and of depressions on peat substrates of the Rhynchosporion.

== Location ==
The Carrownagappul Bog SAC is located approximately 3 km north of the town of Mountbellew in east County Galway, in the townlands of Ballynalahy, Carrownagannive, Carrownagappul, Cloonconore, Gunnode, Springlawn and Tully. Schedule 1 of the Statutory Instrument for this site (S.I. No. 140/2017) identifies it as encompassing an area of 485.66 hectares. A detailed map of the SAC area is included in the National Parks and Wildlife Service Conservation Objectives for the site. A satellite map (and illustrative video) of the bog is also available from the Carrownagappul project website, Galway's Living Bog. The archival records for Carrownagappul on the Logainm.ie website (the Placenames Database of Ireland, which records the placenames data, records and research of the State) note that the anglicised name ‘Carrownagappul’ or in the original Irish language, Ceathrú na gCapall, corresponds to “the quarter of the horses”. No further explanation is given there to link the area to horses. The writer and historian Patrick Weston Joyce also referred to Carrownagappul as “Ceathramha-na-gcapall, quarter-land of the cappuls or horses”. The ‘’ceathrú’’ or ‘quarter’ is a division of land, while ‘capall’ is an Irish word for horse.

== Special Area of Conservation qualification ==
The Carrownagappul Bog site was proposed as a Natura 2000 site (‘Site of Community Importance’ or SCI) in 1998 under the Habitats Directive. Statutory Instrument No. 140 of 2017, establishing the site as an SAC (Site code: 001242), was passed in 2017. The ecological features for which this site received a Special Area of Conservation designation are:

- Active raised bogs (Annex I priority feature) [Natura 2000 code 7110]
- Degraded raised bogs still capable of natural regeneration [Natura 2000 code 7120]
- Depressions on peat substrates of the Rhynchosporion habitat [Natura 2000 code 7150]

The Biodiversity Information System for Europe website notes that Carrownagappul Bog comprises one of the largest extant areas of uncut high bog surface in East Galway, with a relatively large area of active raised bog. The Carrownagappul Bog site is also a proposed National Heritage Area site or pNHA. Close to the Carrownagappul Bog SAC are the Curraghlehanagh Bog and Shankill West Bog SAC sites, which are also pNHA sites, Derrinlough (Cloonkeenleananode) Bog SAC, which is also a Natural Heritage Area (or NHA), the Suck River Callows (a Special Protection Area and NHA), and Summerville Lough, a pNHA. The Galway County Geological Site Report of 2019 notes that Carrownagappul bog is ranked as a County Geological Site due to the geological and hydrogeological process of peat growth, and that it should be designated as a Geological NHA. The bedrock at the site is primarily Lower Carboniferous limestone. The peat at the site was laid down approximately 7,000-10,000 years ago, and is of the Quaternary period, having formed in marshy conditions since deglaciation.

== Site features ==
According to the statutory instrument for the site, the area of land designated as Carrownagappul Bog Special Area of Conservation is 485.66 ha in size. From the NPWS Conservation Objectives document of 2015 and the survey document of 2012, it consists of 28.1 hectares of active raised bog, and 52.1 hectares of degraded raised bog within 323.5 hectares of high bog. Rhynchosporion vegetation occurs in the active bog site. A comprehensive survey of the site was carried out in October 2012. In the report of this survey, the site is described as a Western Raised Bog and as a Ridge Basin Bog. This type of bog is intermediate between the domed mires of basins and the blanket bogs of western Ireland. The 2012 survey described the bog as having:

"an approximately triangular shape and is somewhat fragmented in places by tracks that cross the high bog. The bog has been extensively cutaway around much of the margin and there are face banks of varying height around the site. An extensive drainage network covers much of the high bog."

The National Parks and Wildlife Service site synopsis for this site, published in 2013, notes that numerous bog roads, tracks and drains extend into the centre of this bog. The Carrownagappul Bog SAC includes three protected types of ecosystem: active raised bog, degraded raised bogs still capable of natural regeneration, and depressions on peat substrates of the Rhynchosporion habitat.

=== Active raised bog ===
The Carrownagappul Bog SAC includes a relatively large area of active raised bog, an Annex I priority habitat requiring protection under the European Union Habitats Directive. Annex 1 habitats are those requiring designation as Special Areas of Conservation, and priority habitats are those which are considered in danger of disappearing in the European Union. In this ecotype, there is a high, wet, peat-forming bog with a high percentage cover of Sphagnum spp., and where some or all of these features are present: hummocks, pools, wet flats, Sphagnum lawns, flushes and/or soaks. Active raised bog as a habitat is characterised by the presence of an acrotelm - the living, actively peat-forming upper layer, the surface of which is composed mainly of living bog mosses (Sphagnum spp.). The overall status of this type of habitat in Ireland is currently regarded as ‘Bad’. The Carrownagappul Bog SAC includes 28.1 hectares of active raised bog. Of this active raised bog, only 4.12 hectares is considered of high quality and this included 2.74 hectares of central ecotope and 1.38 hectares of active flushes. It is described as notably wet, and includes areas of quaking bog. The topography of the area includes large and interconnecting pools, low hummocks, high hummocks, hollows and lawns. The flora to be found here includes the aquatic mosses Sphagnum cuspidatum and Sphagnum auriculatum, as well as bogbean (Menyanthes trifoliata), common cottongrass (Eriophorum angustifolium), great sundew (Drosera anglica) and white beak-sedge (Rhynchospora alba). Rhynchosporion vegetation occurs here in the wet flats and numerous pools. Total Sphagnum cover in the central ecotope is approximately 76-90% and in the active flushes is 34-50%. The bog mosses Sphagnum cuspidatum, Sphagnum papillosum, Sphagnum magellanicum, Sphagnum capillifolium, Sphagnum austinii and Sphagnum fuscum are all found here.

=== Degraded raised bogs still capable of natural regeneration ===
Degraded raised bog are differentiated from active raised bogs by the complete absence (or patchy thin cover) of an acrotelm (the living, actively peat-forming upper layer of the bog). This typically occurs in areas of high bog where the bog hydrology has been negatively impacted by peat cutting, drainage, or other land use activities, but which ay be restored. To qualify as a degraded raised bog, there must be a reasonable expectation that these areas are capable of natural regeneration to active bog within 30 years with remediation of their hydrology. Carrownagappul Bog SAC includes a large area of uncut high bog. Degraded raised bog covers 295.41ha or 91.32% of the high bog area. The degraded areas of the bog are drier than those of the active bog. This area is characteristically poor in species and is dominated by bog asphodel (Narthecium ossifragum), carnation sedge (Carex panicea) and heather (Calluna vulgaris). Other plants occurring here include hare's-tail cottongrass (Eriophorum vaginatum), deergrass and cross-leaved heath (Erica tetralix). There is a much lower proportion of Sphagnum moss cover in the degraded raised bog: the wettest of the sub-marginal community complexes had approximately 30-40% cover, while some other areas had approximately 26-33% Sphagnum cover. The species of Sphagnum occurring here tended to be primarily Sphagnum capillifolium which can tolerate drier conditions. Other species occurring here include the hypnoid moss Hypnum cupressiforme and the lichen Cladonia portentosa. The topography of this habitat includes some good quality pools (in the range of 11-25% cover) and tear pools (approximately 5% cover).

=== Depressions on peat substrates of the Rhynchosporion ===
The habitat type “Depressions on peat substrates of the Rhynchosporion” consists of

“Highly constant pioneer communities of humid exposed peat or, sometimes, sand, with Rhynchospora alba, Rhynchospora fusca, Drosera intermedia, Drosera rotundifolia, and Lycopodiella inundata, forming on stripped areas of blanket bogs or raised bogs, but also on naturally seep- or frost-eroded areas of wet heaths and bogs, in flushes and in the fluctuation zone of oligotrophic pools with sandy, slightly peaty substratum. These communities are similar, and closely related, to those of shallow bog hollows (Pal. 51.122) and of transition mires (Pal. 54.57).”

This habitat is found in both active and degraded raised bog at Carrownagappul. These are considered to be best developed and most stable in the wettest areas of active raised bog. It occurs most frequently in one of the Sub-Central Ecotope Complexes It is to be found in wet depressions, pool edges and erosion channels. The flora includes white beak-sedge (Rhynchospora alba), brown beak-sedge (Rhynchospora fusca), and at least some of the following associated species: bog asphodel (Narthecium ossifragum), carnation sedge (Carex panicea), deergrass (Trichophorum cespitosum) and species of sundews (Drosera spp.).

=== Lagg zone ===
One feature of raised bogs is a transition zone or lagg, between the peat and adjoining mineral soils, where water from the surrounding soils collects and mingles with the water from the bog itself. Intact lagg areas are uncommon now, due to peat cutting, and are of considerable interest from a conservation aspect. The lagg zone of Carrownagappul Bog (approximately 0.5 hectares) is nearly intact and has been surveyed. It included five vegetative communities, ranging from ombrotrophic bog (community A) at the high bog margin through heathy Molinia grassland (communities B and C) to wet fen in the lagg proper (communities D and E).

The survey of the site indicated that, aside from the Annex I habitats already recorded at Carrownagappul Bog, there appear to be two further Annex I habitats in the lagg area of the bog: alkaline fen and transition mire. The Annex II butterfly species Marsh Fritillary (Euphydryas aurinia) was also found here. The survey notes that the boundary of this SAC does not include all of this high conservation value lagg zone. Research on cutover bogs in Ireland also showed other Annex I habitats may be present at Carrownagappul Bog. A candidate site for the Annex I habitat 'Molinia meadows' (Natura code 6410) was identified at the semi-intact lagg site of the bog, including the species Cirsium dissectum, Carex pulicaris, Carex echinata, Carex viridula, Juncus conglomeratus, Luzula multiflora, Potentilla erecta and Succisa pratensis.

=== Patch's Garden ===
Underneath the bog, there are several low relief eskers. A small raised mineral/till island surrounded by deep peat, the site of a smallholding in the late 1800s, is an unusual feature of this site. This area was farmed by a local man named Patch Cronin. This feature was retained and integrated into the restoration work on the bog. Several looped walks through the bog originate from this site.

=== Bird life ===
The Carrownagappul Bog SAC is known to be a habitat for Irish red grouse (Lagopus lagopus scotica). The red grouse population at this site was managed by the Mountbellew-Moylough Game Preservation Association. The red grouse is a Red-List species in the Birds of Conservation Concern in Ireland review. The hen harrier (Circus cyaneus), an Annex I species on the E.U. Birds Directive, is an occasional visitor to the site, mainly in winter.

== EU LIFE project ==
The European Union LIFE programme funds climate- and environmental-related projects. One of these projects is The Living Bog – Raised Bog Restoration Project (LIFE14 NAT/IE/000032), carried out under EU LIFE Nature & Biodiversity funding. This project initially ran from 2016 to 2021 and involved 12 Irish bogs in seven counties, restoring over 2,600 hectares of important raised bog habitat. One of the sites involved is the Carrownagappul Bog SAC.

The project involved both restoration work at the bog and public engagement work. Approximately 3,000 peat dams were installed at the cutover bog and high bog. A flume was installed to monitor the water runoff from the bog. An interpretive centre was developed at Galway Teleworks/Mountbellew Mart (as the habitat is too sensitive to allow for such a development to be built on the site itself. Paths and tracks were installed. The Living Bog restoration project was nominated for a Natura 2000 award in 2020. The peatland restoration work of The Living Bog concluded in March 2022.

“…the project has improved the condition of over 2,650ha of raised bog habitat and is on target to achieve over 720ha of Active Raised Bog habitat across the project sites, which will equate to an increase of over 50% since 2016. It is also estimated that an extra 100 tonnes of CO_{2} is being sequestered per year as a result of the work, and this will increase in the coming years as vegetation becomes established and the bogs achieve renewed equilibriums.”

After the LIFE project finished on Carrownagappul Bog, a follow-up project called AFTERLIFE was initiated to maintain the work. “Targeted monitoring is ongoing as part of the AfterLIFE plan of the Living Bog project which will continue until 2027.” Assessments of the changes brought about by the LIFE project have been published in the AFTERLIFE project, for example, effects on ecosystem services, on hydrology and vegetation, and on water discharge and water quality. The ecosystem services examined were climate change mitigation through peat formation, water quality and flood mitigation, and support of habitat and species biodiversity. It is estimated that CO_{2} emissions were reduced by approximately 426 tonnes, or 32%, over the timeline of the project, due to the reduction in the area of otherwise ‘dry’ ecotope, water levels in most of these areas, have risen to within 20 cm of the ground surface, which is the target level required for peat-forming vegetation to re-establish. Assessment in 2021 showed the extent of active raised bog had increased on the site to a total of 45.3 hectares, an increase of 17.2 hectares since baseline.

== Conservation objectives ==
In the third report on the assessment of the status of Irish habitats and species to be conserved under the Habitats Directive in 2019, the active raised bog, degraded raised bog and Rhynchosporion depressions habitats are assessed as having a conservation status of bad and deteriorating. The site-specific conservation objectives for the Carrownagappul Bog SAC were outlined by the National Parks and Wildlife Service in 2015, with the purpose of defining favourable conservation conditions for the protected habitats at this site. The objectives are laid out for the active raised bog habitat at the site. As the long-term aim for the degraded raised bog habitat is to re-establish its peat-forming capability, and as the ‘depressions on peat substrates of the Rhynchosporion’ habitat is a feature of good quality active raised bogs, separate objectives were not set for those two habitats.

The conservation objective for the habitat area is to restore the active raised bog on site to 69.9 hectare (including 28.1 hectares of existing active raised bog mapped in 2014, 36.5 hectares of potentially restorable degraded raised bog and 5.3 hectares of bog-forming habitat from the cutover bog). Distribution and variability of active raised bog should be restored across the SAC. The area of high bog should be maintained to at least the area of 323.5 hectares mapped in 2012. Water levels must be maintained to near or above the surface of the bog lawns for most of the year. Appropriate high bog topography, flow directions and slopes should be maintained, at these will affect the water levels of the bog. Approximately 35 hectares of central ecotope/active flush/soaks/bog woodland should be restored, to bring the level of this habitat type to 50% of the active raised bog area.

The Carrownagappul Bog SAC Restoration plan was published in October 2022. This document outlines the most relevant measures to be taken to restore this site. These include blocking of high bog drains, blocking of drains on cutover bog, contour and cell bunding, and general site management (including fire prevention and response, and management of littering/fly-tipping). The SAC restoration plan emphasises engagement with community stakeholders as a key action relating to the development of a drainage management plan for the site, and the plan also includes actions to optimise community benefits. At the time of publication (2022), significant progress had been made towards the plan's key actions, including preliminary works such as hydrological characterisation, ecological surveys, stakeholder consultation and community engagement, compensation/land acquisition, screening, and implementation of restoration measures. Post-works inspections and an update of the restoration plan are ongoing, and there are currently no outstanding significant restoration works.

== Conservation threats ==
=== Peat extraction ===
Peat extraction is known to be a threat to the conservation of SACs. The cutting of peat on this SAC has previously been recorded as a threat to the conservation of the site.

"Peat cutting and drainage have been the most threatening activities at the site in the current reporting period. 3.10ha of high bog have been lost in the reporting period due to peat cutting, which has taken place at 51 locations around the high bog margin. Information from the NPWS suggests that there were no active turf plots in 2012, but one plot actively cut in 2013. Although the activity intensity has been considerably reduced at least partly due to the strategy of re-locating turf cutters to other local bogs, it cannot be ruled out that turf cutting is re-initiated in other locations or intensified where it currently takes place.”

In 1999, the Irish state granted a derogation on the extraction of peat for this and other peatland sites. This derogation ended in 2008, as there was ongoing damage to the sites (at a rate of 2-4% per annum). At the time of this arrangement, these sites had been candidate SACs rather than fully designated SACs. A compensation scheme was implemented for individuals impacted by the cessation of peat-cutting at this and other SAC and Natural Heritage Area (NHA) sites. The options offered to people with peat-cutting rights on these sites included:

- Annual Payment Scheme (A payment of €1,500 per annum (index linked) for 15 years together with a once-off incentive payment of €500) further to the signing of a legal agreement with the relevant Minister.

or

- Bog Relocation Scheme (where feasible, qualifying applicants will be facilitated in relocating to non-designated sites to continue turf cutting)

An interim arrangement was provided to those who opted to join the Bog Relocation Scheme while they awaited the investigation and preparation of alternative peat-cutting sites. This was to receive the Annual Payment Scheme, or to receive an annual supply of 15 tonnes of cut turf delivered to their homes.

In December 2019, the Minister for Culture, Heritage and the Gaeltacht noted in Dáil Éireann (the lower house of the Irish legislature) that 59 applicants to the Turf Cutting Cessation Scheme for Carrownagappul Bog were regularly receiving annual payments and that three applicant who regularly received annual payments had applied for relocation. Data on the Cessation of Turf Cutting Compensation Scheme Statistics for SACs dataset indicates that there had been 140 applications for the compensation scheme for Carrownagappul Bog, of which 34 applicants requested relocation. Turf delivery was requested by 35 individuals in year 1 of the scheme, and by year 4, only five individuals received turf deliveries as part of the scheme. There were 71 legal agreement payments recorded. In year 1 of the scheme, 76 individuals received payment, while 51 individuals received payment in year 5 of the scheme. An investigation into peat-cutting on SAC sites carried out in 2022 showed that this peat-cutting occurred to a low level at the active raised bog at Carrownagappul Bog SAC between 2012 and 2021, with only 2 plots cut in this period. However, there has been significant support locally for the restoration of the bog, the development of the Living Bog project and the recognition of its value as a carbon sink, ecological refuge and visitor amenity. The recent study on the lagg zones of the site also indicated that peat-cutting appears to be in the main a historical issue only for the site.

=== Drainage issues ===
The restoration plan records that "Due to the effects of peripheral drainage and burning, most of the high bog habitat is in a rather dry state and thus the vegetation is dominated by varying mixtures of either Carex panicea and/or Narthecium ossifragum".

== Music and art ==
The Carrownagappul site has inspired diverse creativity in people, including the composer Bill Carslake and nature photographer Tina Claffey. In 2023, they collaborated on creative work inspired by the site. Bill Carslake composed a piece for solo marimba and timpani with two orchestras after spending a period of time in fieldwork at Carrownagappul. This piece was written to celebrate the wider community of Imperial College Sinfonietta and the rich artistic life at Imperial College, London. The photography of Tina Claffey was used in the concert programme booklet. Ms Claffey guided the composer through the ecology of the peatland site during his fieldwork, and spoke at the concert.

== See also ==
- List of bogs
- List of Special Areas of Conservation in the Republic of Ireland
