= Butterburn Flow =

Protected area in Cumbria, England

- Site of Special Scientific Interest
- Location within Cumbria
- Location of Butterburn Flow.
- Area of search: Cumbria
- Grid reference: NY673763
- Coordinates: 55.080064°N 2.5137330°W
- Area: 1,011 acres (4.1 km^{2}; 1.6 sq mi)
- Notification date: 1984

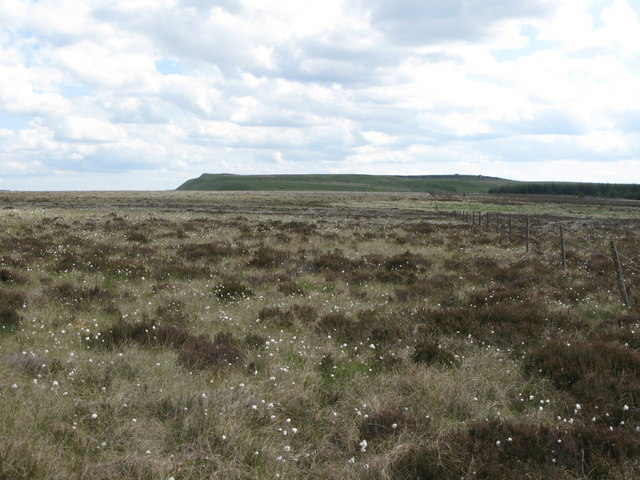
Butterburn Flow

Butterburn Flow is a Site of Special Scientific Interest (SSSI) in Cumbria, England. It is located north of Greenhead. Some of the borders of this protected area follow the River Irthing. This protected area contains important blanket bog habitat that occurs over deep peat. Butterburn Flow is the largest bog within the wider Border Mires complex.

== Details ==
This protected area contains large extents of blanket bog that are intact. Moss species include Sphagnum magellanicum, Sphagnum papillosum, Sphagnum pulcrum and Sphagnum imbricatum. Plant species recorded in this protected area include bog rosemary and cloudberry.

There are no paths on this site.

== Land ownership and management ==
All of the land within Butterburn Flow SSSI is owned by the Forestry Commission. The site is managed by the Northumberland Wildlife Trust.
