= Garron Plateau =

Protected natural area in Northern Ireland

Designations

Ramsar Wetland
- Official name: Garron Plateau
- Designated: 31 December 1998
- Reference no.: 969

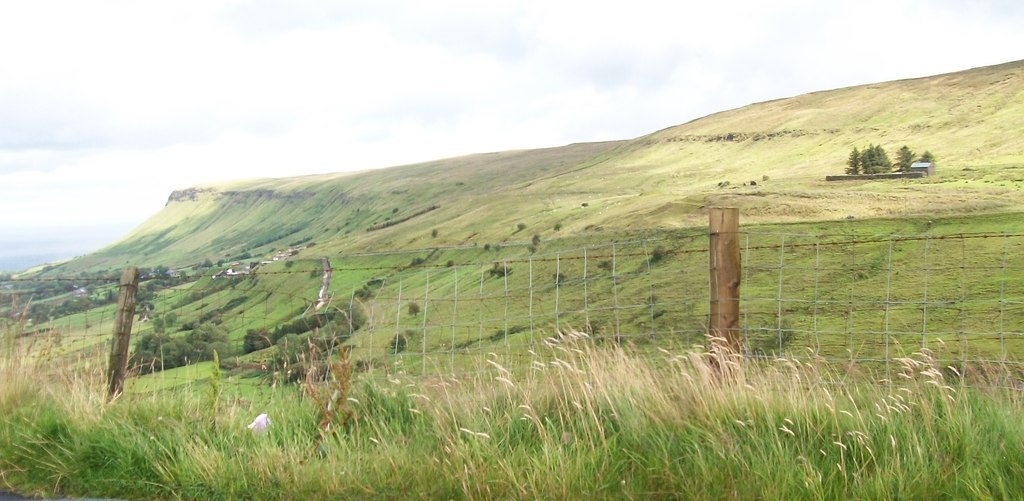

Garron Plateau ASSI is a 4652.18-hectare area of special scientific interest in County Antrim, Northern Ireland. Upland blanket bogs cover basalt rocks, and flushing by mineral-enriched water has resulted in the formation of alkaline fen vegetation. There are small areas of standing and running water but bogs, marshes, water fringed vegetation and fens cover 70% of the area. The remainder is heath and scrubland, humid grassland and mesophile grassland.

The peatland complex is composed of a series of raised and flushed peat bog and oligotrophic lakes. Plants include Erica tetralix, Trichophorum cespitosum, Eriophorum vaginatum, dwarf-shrubs and Sphagnum papillosum, Sphagnum fuscum and Sphagnum imbricatum. Garron Plateau is the main Irish location for Carex pauciflora and Carex magellanica. The areas of flushed peat are floristically rich, with black bog-rush Schoenus nigricans and brown mosses. The site contains populations of Saxifraga hirculus and the bog orchid Hammarbya paludosa.
