= Bursdon Moor =

Protected area in Devon, England

Coordinates: 50°57′0″N 4°28′12″W

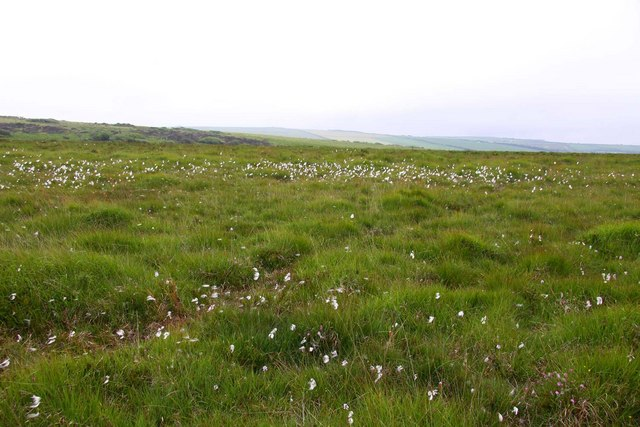
Bursdon Moor

Bursdon Moor is a Site of Special Scientific Interest in Devon, England. It is located 4km northeast of Welcombe. This site is protected because of the dry heath and wet heath present here, including peatland.

== Biology ==
Dominant plants in the dry heath include heather, cross-leaved heath and western gorse. Other herbaceous plant species include petty whin, saw-wort, heath spotted-orchid, devil's-bit scabious, wood sage, cat's ear and betony. Moss species include Sphagnum compactum, Sphagnum tenellum and Leucobryum glaucum. Lichen species include Cladonia impexa and Cladonia pyxidata and the liverwort Lophozia ventricosa (genus Lophozia) has been recorded here.

In the peat soils of the wet heath, plants include bog asphodel and bog violet. Moss species include Sphagnum papillosum and Sphagnum cuspidatum.

There is also an area of acidic marshy grassland where plant species include bogbean, bog pondweed and water horsetail.

Butterflies recorded in this protected area include marsh fritillary, small pearl-bordered fritillary, marbled white and the green hairstreak. Other insect species include scarce cranefly, Limnophila pulchella (genus Limnophila) and leaf beetle.

Reptile species include viviparous lizard and adder. Bird species include curlew, meadow pipit, skylark, and grasshopper warbler.

== Geology ==
This protected area is positioned on shale rocks of the Crackington formation from the Culm measures of Carboniferous age.

== Archaeology ==
There are Bronze age burial mounds within Bursdon Moor SSSI.
