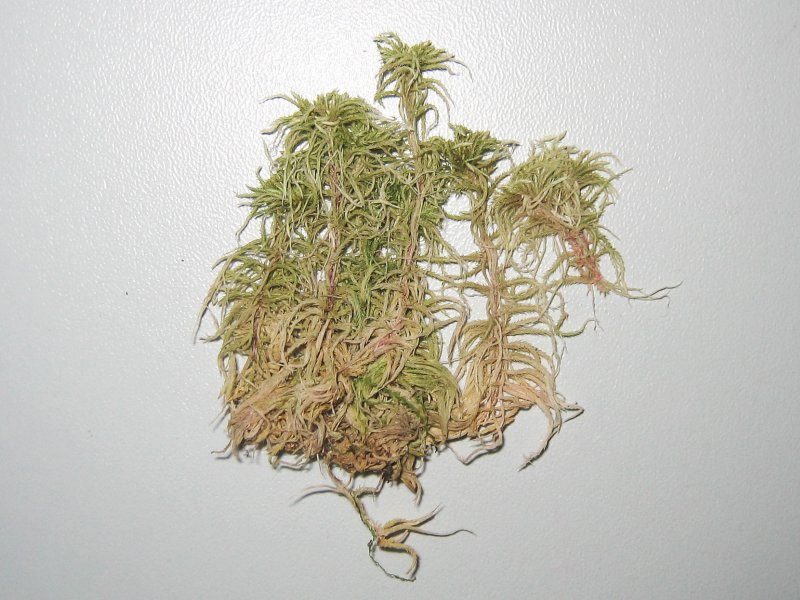

Scientific classification
- Kingdom: Plantae
- Division: Bryophyta
- Class: Sphagnopsida
- Order: Sphagnales
- Family: Sphagnaceae
- Genus: Sphagnum
- Species: S. subnitens

Binomial name
- Sphagnum subnitens Russow & Warnst.

= Sphagnum subnitens =

Species of moss

Sphagnum subnitens is a species of moss belonging to the family Sphagnaceae.

It has almost cosmopolitan distribution.

== Characteristics ==
This moss type is known to form as either dense cushions or hummocks.

== Habitat ==
Sphagnum subnitens occurs in several environments:

- Boggy grassland
- Marshes
- Fens and Flushes
- Ditches
- Wet woodland
- Heather banks
- Blanket bogs
