= Border Mires =

Peat bogs in northern England

Border Mires is a group of around 60 peat bogs straddling Cumberland and Northumberland, in and around the Kielder Forest. It is part of what was once the largest continuous tract of blanket bogs across northern England and is a Special Area of Conservation (SAC), designation number UK0012923.

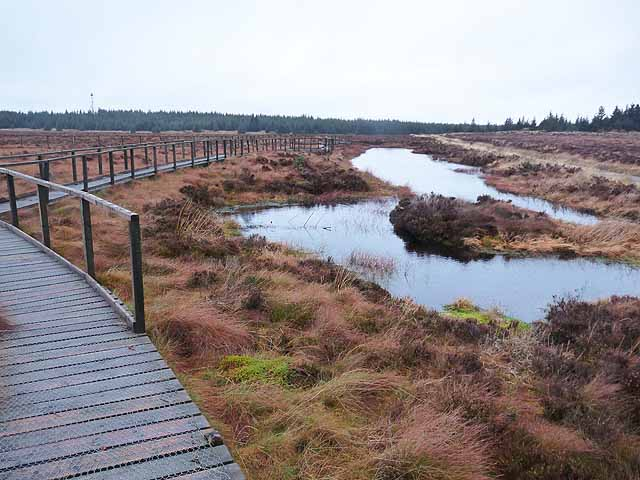
Bell Crag Flow

The largest of these peat bogs are:

- Butterburn Flow (447 hectares)
- Bell Crag Flow (150 hectares)
- Muckle Knowe (107 hectares)
- Blind Moss (104 hectares)

The remaining bogs have an average area of 32 hectares with the smallest, Muckle Gowany Knowe, only 1.8 hectares.

Eight of the bogs are a Ramsar site, ‘Irthinghead Mires’ (site 303, designated in 1985):

- Butterburn Flow
- Coom Rigg Moss
- Felicia Moss
- Gowany Knowe
- Grains Heads Moss
- Haining Head Moss
- Hummel Knowe Moss
- The Wou

Many of the bogs sit within their own, or wider Sites of Special Scientific Interest (SSSI). These SSSI sites are:

- Butterburn Flow
- Kielder Mires
- Spadeadam Mires
Border Mires Location Plan

== Restoration ==
The restoration of the Border Mires is one of the earliest and longest-running conservation projects in the UK. Early conservation and restoration work commenced in 1971 with the blocking of drains to help re-wet bog areas. This work was extended over the following decades and continues actively to this day. As well as protecting and improving the existing peat bogs, Forestry England has removed thousands of trees to re-establish bogs that had been lost through afforestation. In addition to blocking drains and felling/mulching trees, a significant number of wader ponds have also been created to encourage birds to return to the area.

Since 1986 restoration has been overseen by the Border Mires Management Committee, which comprises Forestry England, Northumberland Wildlife Trust, Natural England, Ministry of Defence, Northumberland National Park Authority and the University of Newcastle upon Tyne.
