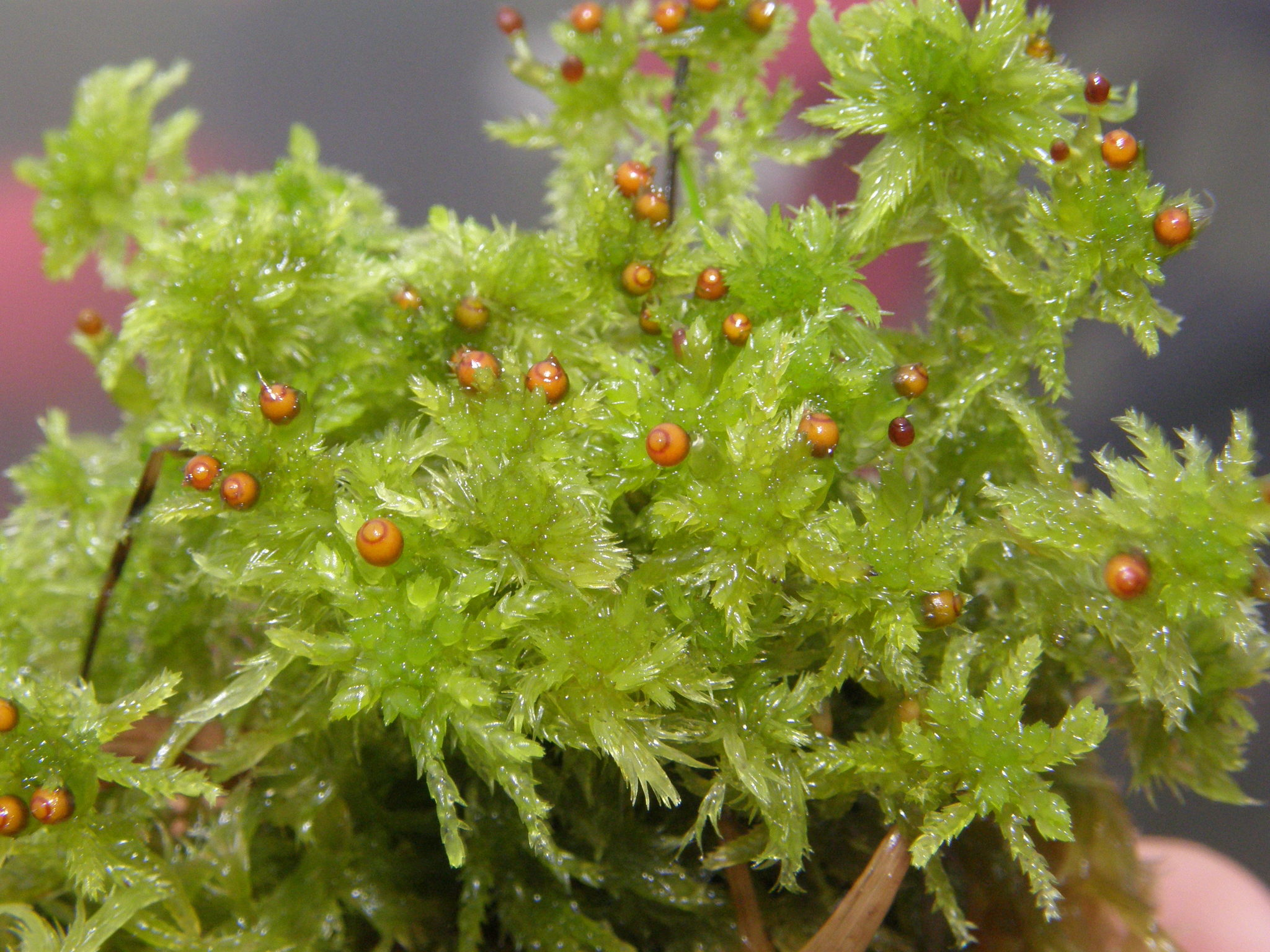

Scientific classification
- Kingdom: Plantae
- Division: Bryophyta
- Class: Sphagnopsida
- Order: Sphagnales
- Family: Sphagnaceae
- Genus: Sphagnum
- Species: S. tenellum

Binomial name
- Sphagnum tenellum (Brid.) Brid.

= Sphagnum tenellum =

Species of moss

Sphagnum tenellum is a species of moss belonging to the family Sphagnaceae.

It is native to Europe, Japan and America and is the smallest British Sphagnum.

== Characteristics ==
This moss type occurs predominantly as small patches or cushions, between 10-20 cm across. It can also appear as scattered stems. It is usually a yellow-orange or yellow-brown colour, but can tend to appear as a more dull green colour when submerged. The branch leaves are noted as strongly concave in shape.

== Habitat ==
Sphagnum tenellum has been noted to appear on acidic, bare and peaty ground, more specifically in bogs, wet heaths and humid, heather-based slopes in areas of high rainfall.
