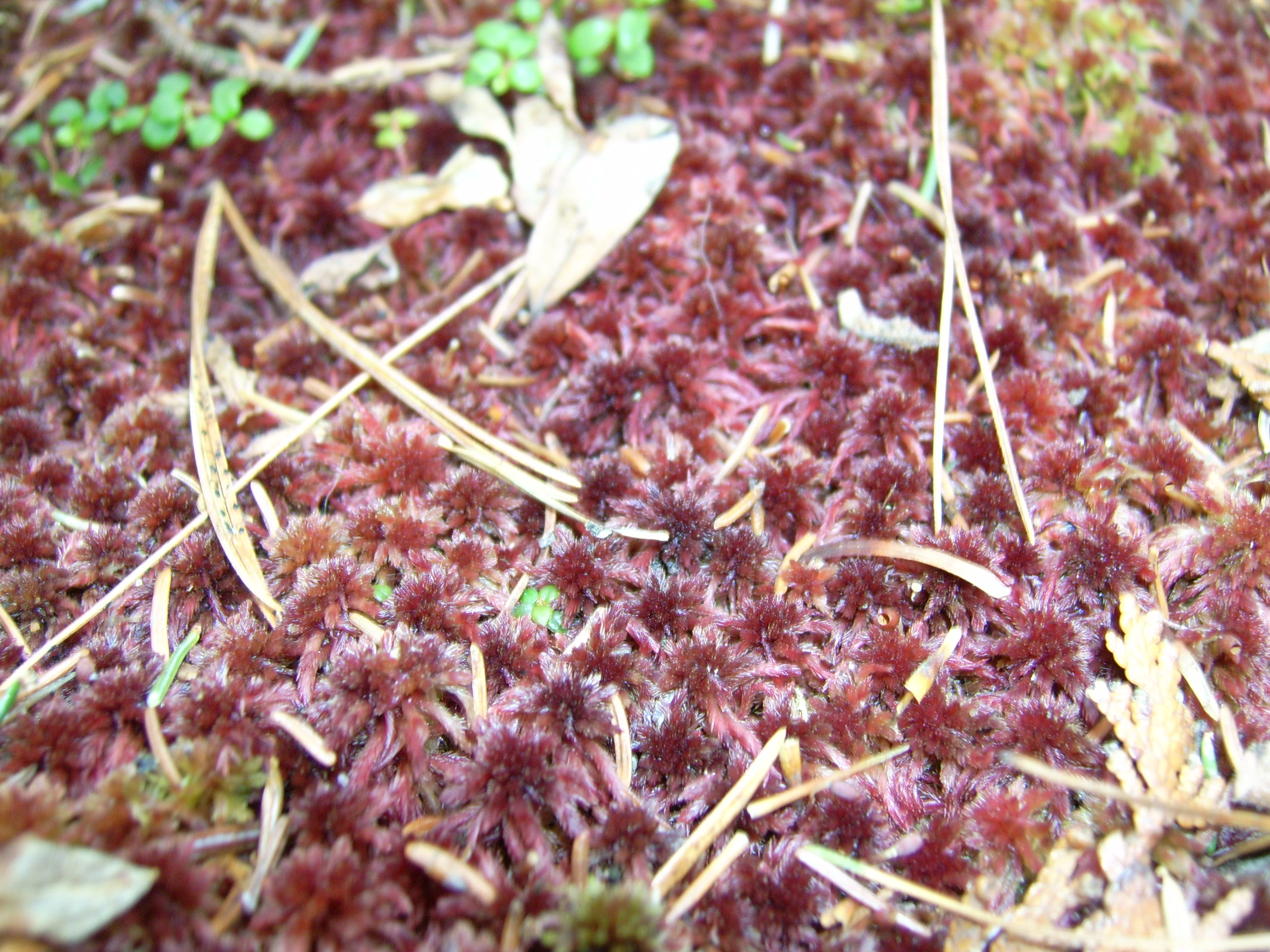
- Small red peat moss in Lake Superior Provincial Park

Scientific classification
- Kingdom: Plantae
- Clade: Embryophytes
- Division: Bryophyta
- Class: Sphagnopsida
- Order: Sphagnales
- Family: Sphagnaceae
- Genus: Sphagnum
- Species: S. capillifolium

Binomial name
- Sphagnum capillifolium (Ehrh.) Hedw.

Synonyms
- S. palustre var. capillifolium Ehrh.; S. acutifolium var. capillifolium (Ehrh.) Funck; S. nemoreum

= Sphagnum capillifolium =

Species of moss

Sphagnum capillifolium, the red bogmoss, northern peat moss, acute-leaved bog-moss, or small red peat moss, is a species of peat moss native to Canada, the northern United States, Greenland, and Europe. Small red peat moss can be distinguished by its sweeping, outward-curving branches that resemble tresses. Sphagnum moss can hold large amounts of water within its cells, up to 20 times its own weight. This capability is due to its dead, empty cells called hyaline cells that fill up with water. This allows the moss to survive in wet, boggy habitats around rivers and lakes.

== Description ==
Small red peat is a brownish-green to pinkish-red moss forming tight, carpet-like mounds. The leaves have no midrib and are tongue-shaped with a bluntly-pointed tip.

== Gallery ==
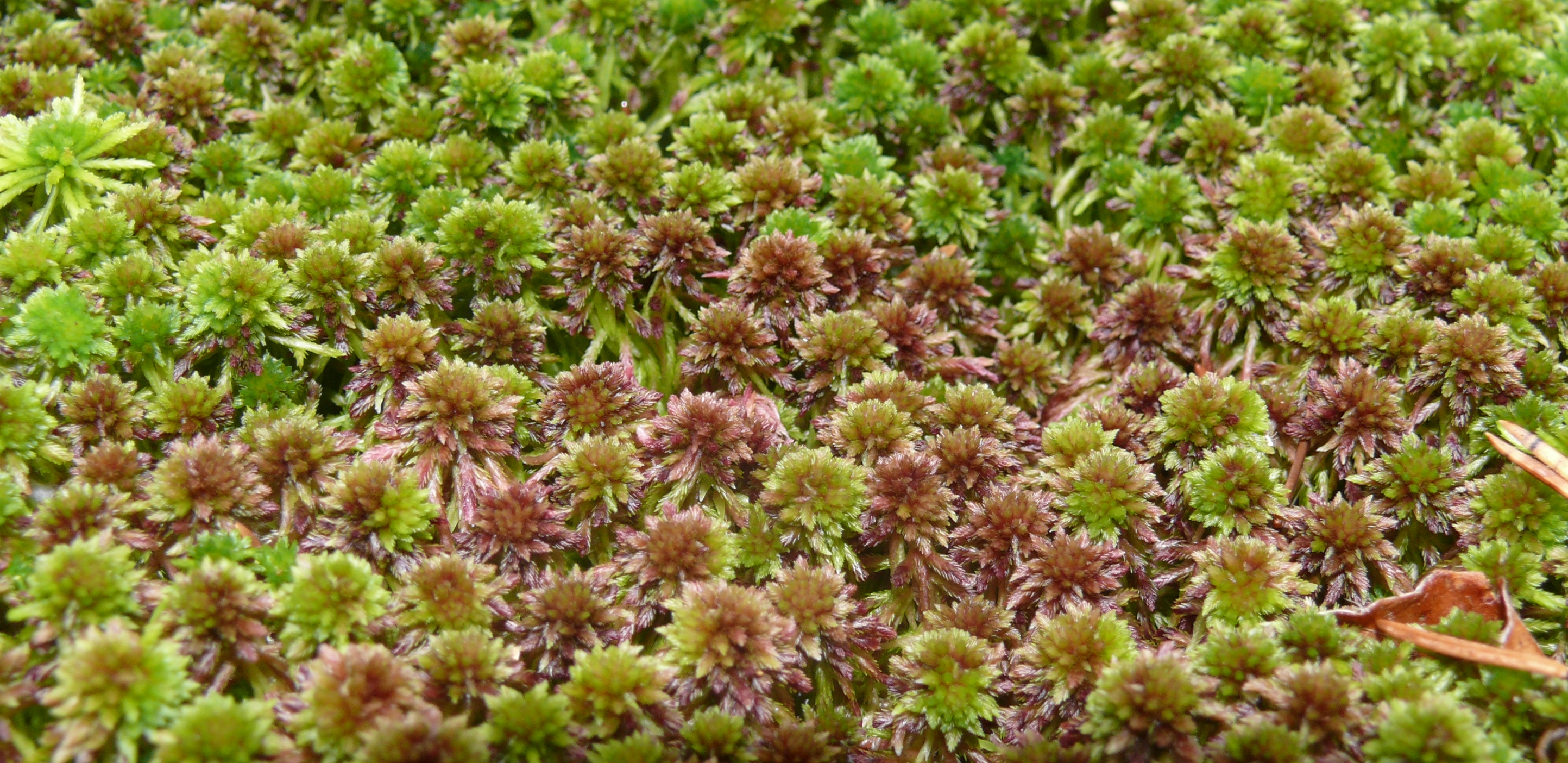

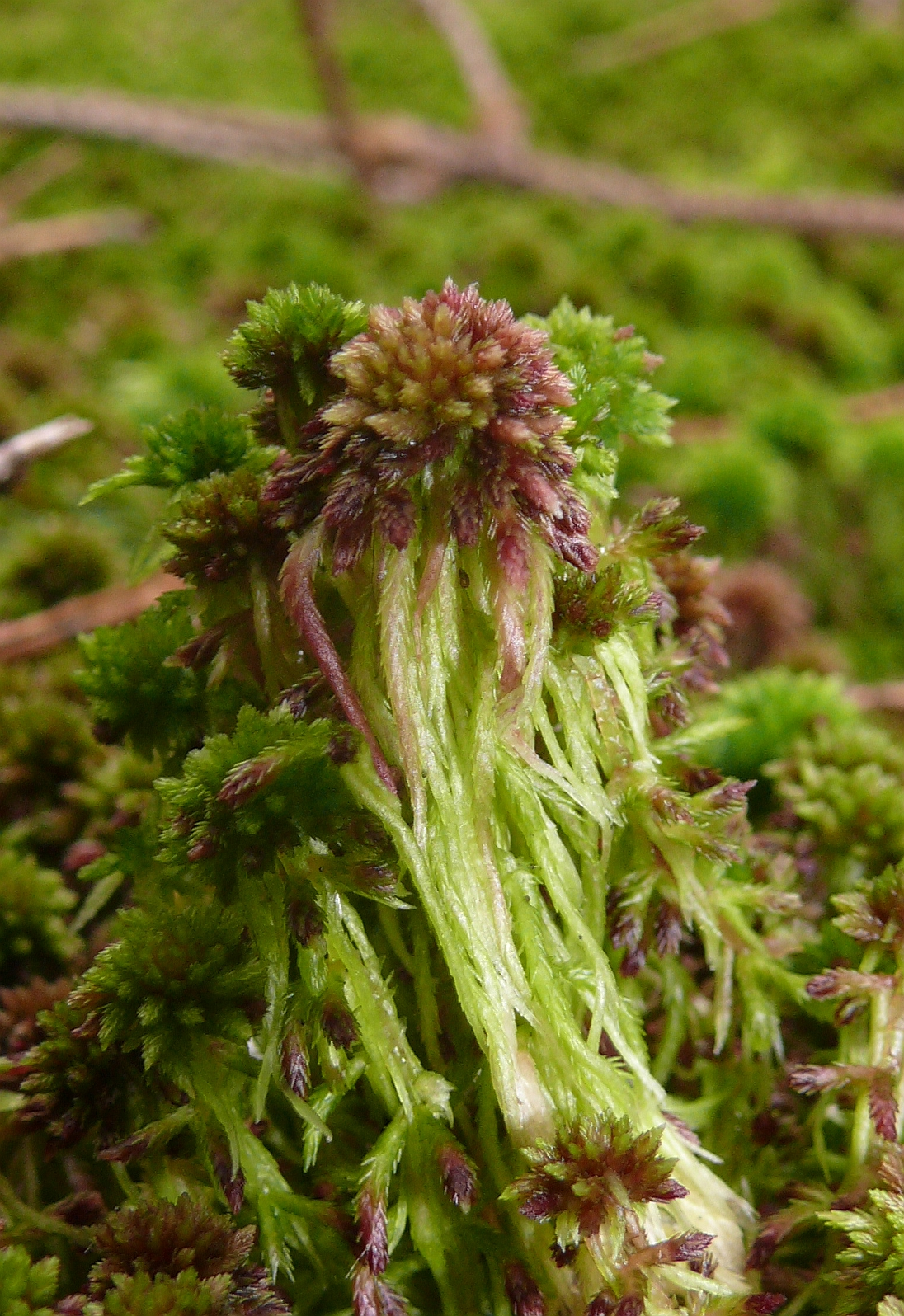

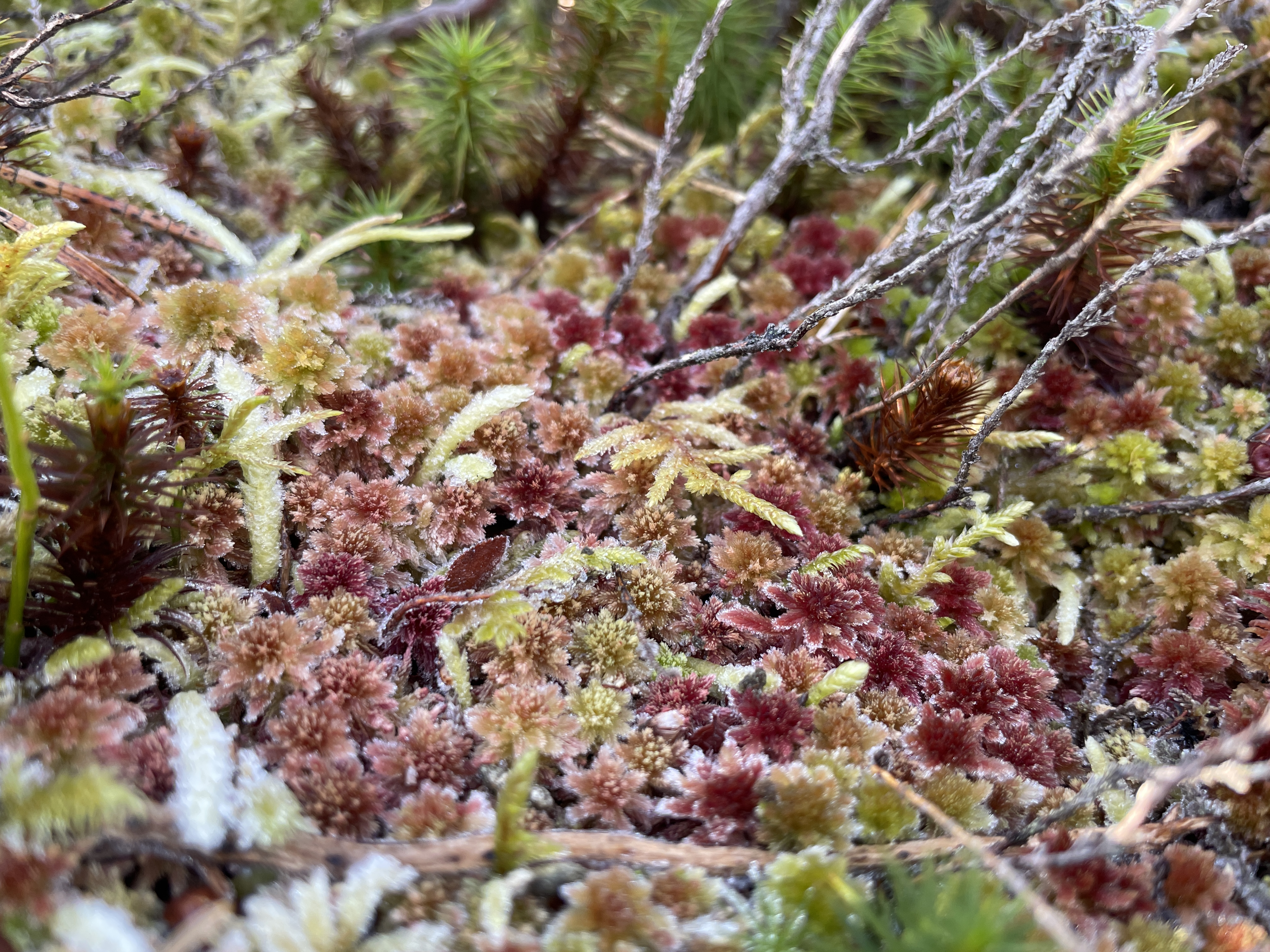
