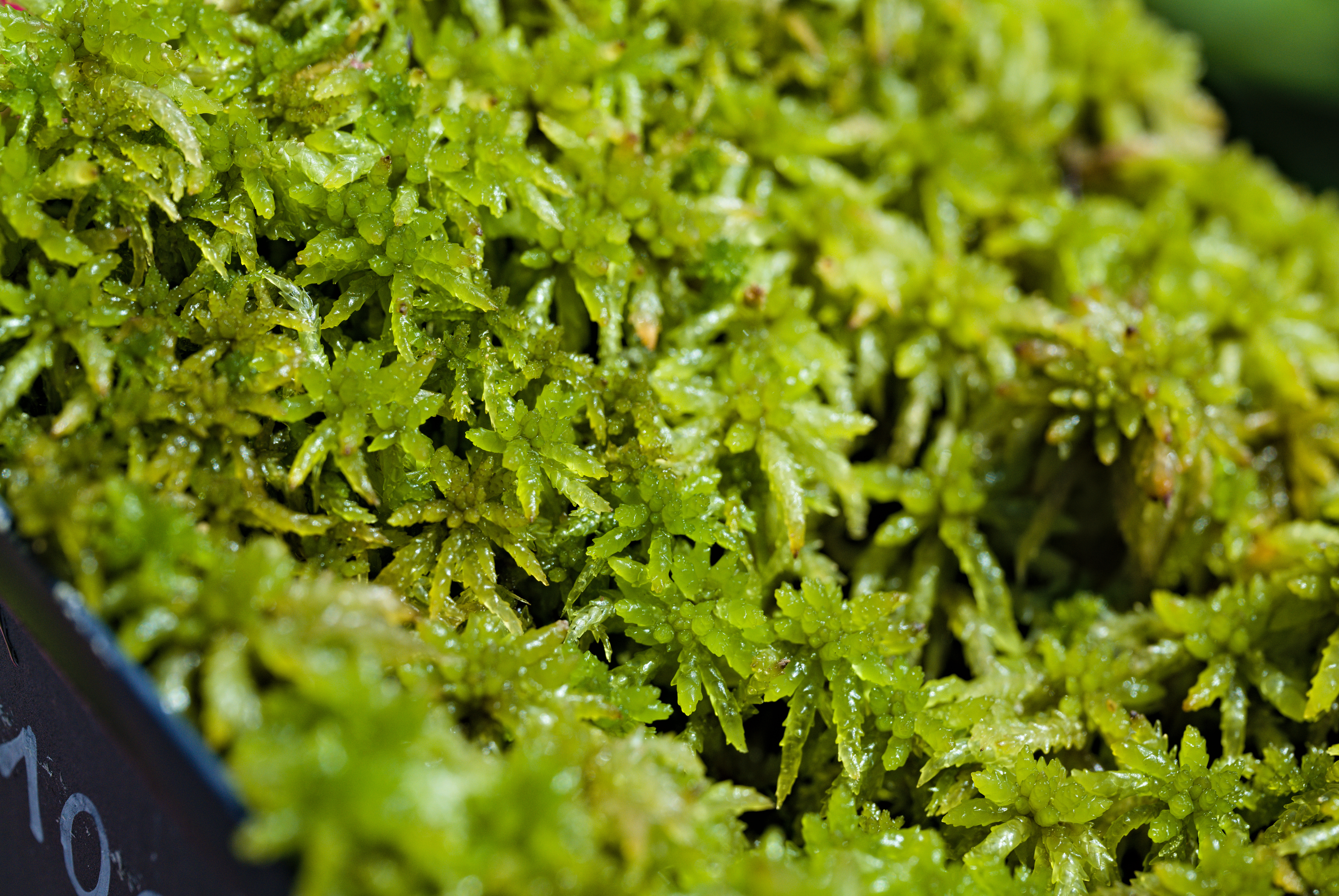

Scientific classification
- Kingdom: Plantae
- Division: Bryophyta
- Class: Sphagnopsida
- Order: Sphagnales
- Family: Sphagnaceae
- Genus: Sphagnum
- Species: S. austinii

Binomial name
- Sphagnum austinii Sull.

Synonyms
- Sphagnum cymbifolium subsp. austinii (Sull.) Cardot; Sphagnum imbricatum var. cristatum Warnst.; Sphagnum imbricatum var. fuscescens Warnst.

= Sphagnum austinii =

Species of moss

Sphagnum austinii, known as Austin's sphagnum, is a species of moss in the family Sphagnaceae. The species can be found on the west coast of Alaska and British Columbia as well as the southeastern coasts of Canada. The species is also found in Northern Europe.
