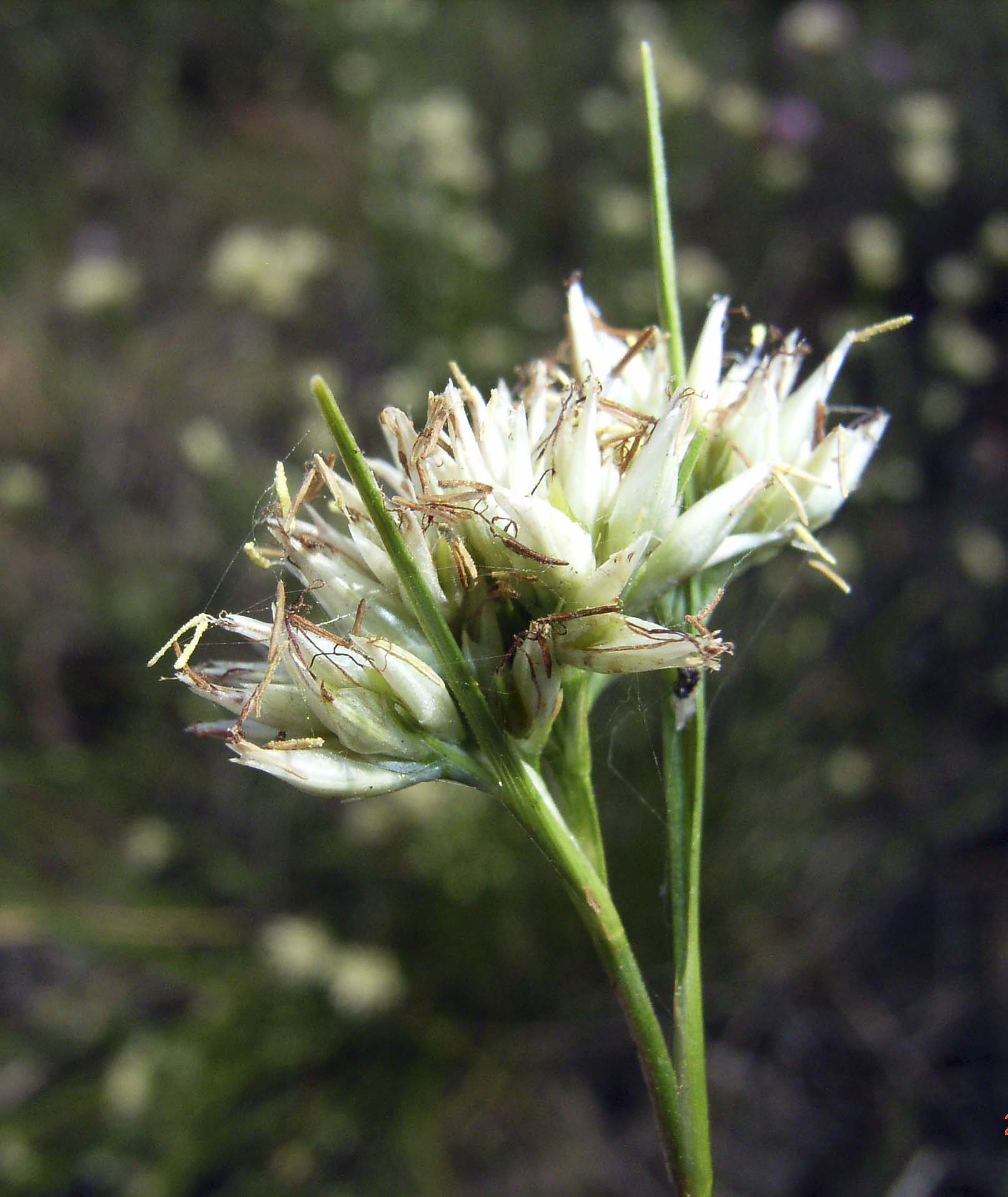

Conservation status
- Least Concern (IUCN 3.1)

Scientific classification
- Kingdom: Plantae
- Clade: Tracheophytes
- Clade: Angiosperms
- Clade: Monocots
- Clade: Commelinids
- Order: Poales
- Family: Cyperaceae
- Genus: Rhynchospora
- Species: R. alba

Binomial name
- Rhynchospora alba (L.) Vahl

Synonyms
- Schoenus albus L.; Mariscus albus (L.) Gilib.; Scirpus albus (L.) Salisb.; Triodon albus (L.) Earw.; Phaecocacephalum album (L.) House; Dichromena alba (L.) J.F.Macbr; Rhynchospora luquillensis Britt.; Rhynchospora alba var. kiusiana Makino.; Rhynchospora alba f. laeviseta Gale

= Rhynchospora alba =

Species of plant

Rhynchospora alba, the white beak-sedge, is a plant in the sedge family, Cyperaceae. It is a tufted herbaceous perennial around 50 cm tall, with white inflorescences that flower in August. The fruit of the sedge is a small achene with a characteristic beak-like cap. It is dispersed by wind or falls by gravity, leading to individuals existing in tight clumps. The species favours wet, acidic and nutrient poor soils, thriving in Sphagnum-dominated bogs, but also peaty grasslands. As such, it is often used as a positive indicator for bog and mire ecosystem health.

The species was first described by Linnaeus in 1753 under a different genus and name, Schoenus albus, but was subsequently reclassified into the novel genus Rhynchospora by Vahl in 1805. It has a wide range across the Northern Hemisphere, extending from the inland wetlands of North America, across Europe to the Korean Peninsula. Due to this large range, there is considerable variation between populations, and numerous varieties have been identified. The plant has few uses, though it is used as an ornamental in the UK.

== Description ==
Rhynchospora alba is a perennial herb between 10 and 50 cm in height, though plants up to 75 cm tall can be found in North America. The plant grows in tight clumps, meaning it is often difficult to distinguish individual stems.

The plant consists of a single erect stem, which is three-angled and thin, usually 0.5–1 mm thick. The leaves attached to the stem are three-ranked (in spirals around the three edges of the stem) and parallel veined, extending up to 15 cm in length ^{[6]}, though none overtop the stem. Each leaf is differentiated into a green or straw coloured sheath, which hugs the stem, and a grey/green blade, which is flat and slender (0.7–2 mm) and tapers to a blunt tip. In some specimens, the margins of the blade are sparsely covered in hairs. Unlike many sedge species, there is no ligule (outgrowths at the meeting of the blade and sheath). At the base of the plant, the leaves have no blade, and only the sheaths are present. These are often subtending a 10–20 mm bud, which will overwinter and grow a new plant in spring.

While most Rhynchospora have large rhizomes (tuber-like stems below the soil surface), R. alba has very small rhizomes, or none at all, and very shallow root systems. This reflects its different life history to many other sedges – R. alba loses all but the basal overwintering bud during the winter, while most other species retain and store nutrients in well-developed rhizome and root structures.

=== Reproductive structures ===
Rhynchospora alba flowers in August, and these flowers are arranged into white inflorescences in a hierarchy of units. Each individual flower is surrounded a white (or brown in older tissues), leaf-like structure called a 'glume'. These glumes are grouped into egg-shaped 'spikelets' between 3 and 6 mm in length, and two to seven of these spikelets are clustered together into a hemispheric cluster, making the inflorescence. As with many other Rhynchospora, there are 4–5 glumes in each spikelet, with the bottom one or two glumes being sterile (they do not contain flowers) and the top three glumes alternating fertile, sterile, fertile. As such there are usually one or two flowers per spikelet. Most plants have between one and three inflorescences growing off the stem, each subtended by a short leaf-like bract, about 2–3 x the length of the inflorescence. Each flower is bisexual, comprising a superior ovary with a bifurcating style and 2–3 anthers (each 1 mm in length). The petals and sepals (perianth) are homogenous and highly modified, forming ring of 9–13 bristles with downward-facing barbs.

After pollination the flower develops into an achene – a dry fruit that is indehiscent (it does not open at maturity) and contains a single seed. This is composed of a 2 mm x 1 mm, egg-shaped achene body and the remnants of the style base of the flower, which forms a 1 mm beak-like structure called the tubercle. The perianth bristles are also retained, and these are shorter than, or the same length as, the achene and tubercle combined. The lengths of both the tubercle and perianth bristles are key characters for distinguishing R. alba from other Rhynchospora species.

=== Similar species ===
White beak-sedge closely resembles a number of other sedges, including the brown beak-sedge (R. fusca) and large beak-sedge (R. macra). It can be distinguished from other species by the reduced size of its rhizomes, the length of the tubercle and perianth bristles on the fruit, and the presence of downward facing barbs on the bristles.

== Etymology ==
The genus Rhynchospora derives from the Greek Rhynkos – "beak" and spora "seed". This, along with the genus’ common name beak-sedge, refers to the long beak-like tubercle at the top of the achene fruit. This is characteristic to the entire genus and is often used for intra-generic classification. The species name alba derives from the Latin albus, or white, and refers to the white glumes surrounding each flower, which give the inflorescence its colour.

The species has multiple common names, the most common being white beak-sedge, again referring to the inflorescence colour and shape of the tubercle. It is also known as white beak-rush, though this is misleading, as it is not in the rush family.

== Habitat and ecology ==
Rhynchospora alba favours acidic, nutrient poor conditions and is found across a range of wetland environments. It is most commonly found in ombrotrophic bogs (where plant nutrients are only obtained through rainfall and dry deposition) and Sphagnum moss-dominated communities, where it is one of the few vascular plant species present. Studies into nutrient and mass allocation by R. alba found the plant exhibits much higher rates of nutrient accumulation and loss across the growing season than in other sedges, which rely more heavily on storage and remobilising of nutrients in rhizomes. This is likely related to the much lower levels of interspecific competition experienced by R. alba in these bogs than other sedges in more grass-dominated environments.

It is also found in peatlands alongside other sedge species such as Carex species. It has a persistent seed bank, with seeds living up to five years. It is therefore often an early re-coloniser in disturbed environments, where it can become the dominant species in so-called R. alba sedgeland. It is much less dominant of more established communities, however, as it is less capable of outcompeting sedge species with more developed root and rhizome systems.

Rhynchospora alba is wind-pollinated and wind-dispersed, so has few close interactions with insect pollinators, but is a major food source for a number of bog-dwelling species, such as Paraphlepsius leafhoppers in the US.

== Distribution ==
Although most species of Rhynchospora are found in tropics, R. alba is more restricted to the higher latitudes of the Northern Hemisphere, where climatic conditions favour the establishment of bogs and fens. It has a wide boreal distribution and is commonly found in the US (north of California and South Carolina), Canada, Europe, the Caucasus, China, Japan and the Korean Peninsula.

It is generally found at lower altitudes (below 850 m), but has been found at higher altitudes at the southern edge of its range, for example in China and Puerto Rico.

== Taxonomy and systematics ==
Owing to the high biodiversity and significant morphological similarity seen across the sedges, R. alba has a somewhat complex taxonomic history. The species was first described by Carl Linnaeus in 1753, and was classified in the same genus as bog rushes (due to similarities in inflorescence) under the binomial name Schoenus albus. This classification proved inaccurate, and Martin Henrichsen Vahl reclassified the species in 1805 as Rhynchospora alba, placing it in a novel genus that grouped species with a characteristic beak-like tubercle on the achene fruit.

Rhynchospora alba (L.) Vahl is the current accepted species name for the white beak-sedge, but there has been considerable contention around its classification over the last 200 years (see below). Neither Vahl nor Linnaeus provided specific type specimens with their descriptions, but a recent typification of R. alba designated a specimen from Linnaeus' collection as a lectotype.

=== Contention around Rhynchospora classification ===
The classification of R. alba has come under considerable scrutiny since Vahl's description, due to conflicting classifications of the genus Rhynchospora and closely related taxa. Vahl classified Rhynchospora based on the tubercle/fruit alone. Other taxonomists, such as Nees, only recognised species with bifid styles as Rhynchospora, and moved many species into 11 other genera (both novel and pre-existing), all within a wider group called the Rhynchosporae. Bentham and Hooker tried to resolve this conflict by splitting Rhynchospora into two subgenera – Diplostylae and Haplostylae – based on the branching pattern of the style. This was only partially accepted, however, and many previously described genera, such as Dichromena, were still used, sometimes even replacing Rhynchospora. This persisted until Kükenthal published an extensive treatment of Rhynchosporae in 1949, and classified all 250 known species into either Rhynchospora or the closely related Pleurostachys, with all other names either synonyms or sub-groups. Kükenthal also split Rhynchospora into subgenera Diplostylae and Haplostylae, and this classification is still widely used today.

The result of this contention is that many Rhynchospora species have numerous synonyms. Those for R. alba include Dichromena alba and Phaecocacephalum album, from attempts to rename all Rhynchospora. These synonyms were identified in monographs by Kükenthal and Gale, as well as more recent studies by Kew's World Checklist of Selected Plant Families.

Many varieties and forms of R. alba have also been described over the last two centuries. Some have subsequently been described as new species – R. alba var. fusca was subsequently reclassified as R. fusca as it was found to have very different morphology. Others, such as R. alba var kiusiana and R. alba f. laeviseta, are considered synonyms, pending more work on the genetic structuring of the species.

=== Insights from molecular phylogeny ===
Before molecular data was more readily available, classification systems such as that of Kükenthal placed R. alba within Rhynchospora subg. Diplostylae based on its tubercle and bifid style. How the tribe Rhynchosporae was related to other groups within the Cyperaceae was less clear, with Kükenthal suggesting they formed their own clade, others suggesting they were part of the larger Cyperaceae tribe Schoenae.

A recent molecular phylogeny suggests that Rhynchosporae are a separate but closely related clade to the Schoenae. Molecular studies within the Rhynchosporae, however, reveal that Kükenthal's widely accepted classification holds less well – neither Haplostylae nor Diplostylae are monophyletic, and there appear to be multiple conversions between bifid and non-bifid styles throughout the genus.

Surprisingly, the genus Pleurostachys (Group I) was also nested within Rhynchospora rather than sister to it. Further study is required to confirm the position of Pleurostachys, but this indicates that Rhynchospora is not monophyletic, and reclassification of both genera may be necessary.

== Uses ==
White beak-sedge is used very little by humans due to its favoured habitat of nutrient-poor acidic bogs, but is sometimes used as an ornamental plant in the UK, and in bog restoration.

== Conservation status ==
Rhynchospora alba is currently assessed by IUCN as least concern, as it is widespread and "habitat loss and degradation is not occurring at a scale to qualify the species for a threatened or near threatened category". On a regional scale, however, it is threatened by land conversion and over grazing in Central and Eastern Europe. It is currently threatened in Switzerland, critically endangered in Croatia and has been reported as extinct in Hungary.

There has been little study into the genetic structuring and threat status of the different varieties of Rhynchospora alba. As such, it is not known if regional population declines are eroding genetic and subspecies diversity, nor whether some sections of the species range are of greater conservation concern than others.
