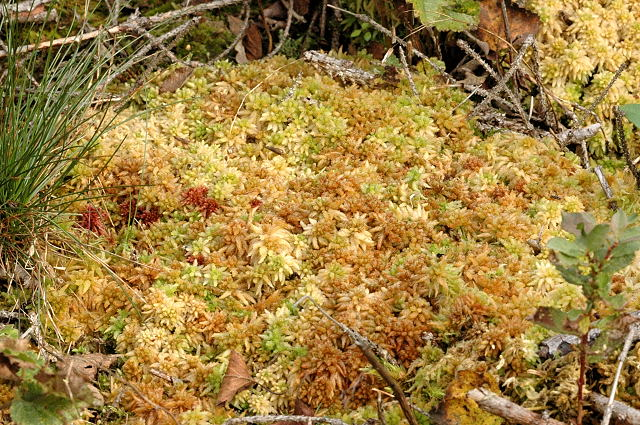

Conservation status
- Least Concern (IUCN 3.1)

Scientific classification
- Kingdom: Plantae
- Division: Bryophyta
- Class: Sphagnopsida
- Order: Sphagnales
- Family: Sphagnaceae
- Genus: Sphagnum
- Species: S. papillosum

Binomial name
- Sphagnum papillosum Lindb.

Synonyms
- Sphagnum cymbifolium var. papillosum (Lindb.) Schimp.; Sphagnum hakkodense Warnst. & Cardot; Sphagnum palustre ssp. papillosum (Lindb.) Russow; Sphagnum waghornei Warnst.; Sphagnum cymbifolium ssp. papillosum (Lindb.) Warnst.

= Sphagnum papillosum =

Species of moss

Sphagnum papillosum, the papillose peatmoss, is a species of peat moss distributed throughout the Northern Hemisphere. Although sometimes confused with Sphagnum imbricatum and Sphagnum palustre, it is distinguished by its yellow-green to brown short, blunt branches and papillose chlorophyllose cells.

== Taxonomy ==
S. papillosum is classified under section Sphagnum of the genus, which also includes the species S. magellanicum, S. palustre, and S. austinii. It was first described by Lindberg in 1872 and typified in 1913. It has previously been described in 1907 from specimens in Japan as S. hakkodense Warnst. & Card.; however, this was later identified to be a synonym and an isotype specimen of S. papillosum. Other synonyms include S. immersum Nees & Hornsch and S. waghornei Warnst.

== Description ==
=== Morphology ===
S. papillosum is distinguished by its robust, golden brown capitulum. It usually has 4 branches: 2 short and blunt divergent (spreading) branches and 2, sometimes 3, short pendent branches. The central cylinder or “wood” of the stem is usually dark brown to almost black in colour and sometimes green. The stem leaves are approximately 1.3 mm long and 0.7 mm wide, usually rectangular or spatulate in shape with a resorbed or fringed abaxial surface, inconspicuous on the adaxial surface. The branch leaves are spreading and can be up to 2 mm long and 1 mm wide. They are ovate to broadly ovate in shape and usually strongly concave.

S. papillosum possesses a pectin-like polysaccharide called Sphagnan, Sphagnum acid, and phenolic compounds in its leaves that have been observed to contribute to known antimicrobial and preservative properties of Sphagnum mosses.

=== Cellular structure ===
The stem cortical cells of S. papillosum are fibrillose with 1-2 pores. The branch cortical cells are also strongly fibrillose. The hyaline cells that make up the leaves are never ornamented, fairly wide, and often divided. There is usually a single pore present at the upper apex of the cell on the adaxial side, while there are many round to elliptic pores along the commissures of the abaxial side. The internal commissural walls appear to be rough or papillose due to cell wall projections that form papillae, a distinguishing feature of this Sphagnum moss. The chlorophyllose cells are rather small compared to other species and are trapezoidal to barrel-shaped in cross section. They are usually equally exposed on both sides or slightly more exposed on the adaxial side of the leaf.

== Distribution ==
S. papillosum is widely distributed throughout North America, Europe, and Asia. It is especially common in western and northern Europe and can extend as far south as the Himalaya mountains.

== Habitat and ecology ==
S. papillosum is oligo-mesotrophic, commonly found in shaded, nutrient-poor fen habitats to open, acidic peatlands. Tends to form hummocks and dense carpets. It can also be found at low to mid-elevations near streams, flushes or transitional mires. These types of habitats are mainly supplied by precipitation; therefore, nutrients such as nitrogen are particularly low and water availability is dependent on rates of rainfall, which both limits the growth and productivity of S. papillosum. Although S. papillosum favours habitats with consistent precipitation, it is relatively tolerant to water stress.

Like other Sphagnum mosses, S. papillosum is sensitive to minerals and nutrients in the water and has been observed to bioaccumulate metals such as cadmium, chromium, and zinc in its tissues. The metal concentrations in S. papillosum has been observed to be a direct reflection of concentrations in its natural waters; therefore, it presents itself as an effective bioindicator of metal concentrations present in the environment.

== Life cycle ==
=== Gametophyte ===
S. papillosum is dioicous. Its antheridial and archegonial branches are morphologically similar to its vegetative branches. The formation of antheridia and archegonia occur in late summer to early autumn. Fertilization occurs in spring.

=== Sporophyte ===
The sporangium mature in mid to late summer and are relatively spherical with numerous pseudostomata. The spores are dispersed all at once when the sporangium matures through an explosive, hygroscopic mechanism triggered by warm and dry conditions. The spores are discharged into the air and dispersed by the wind. Its spores are 26-36 μm in diameter and yellow brown in colour. They are finely papillose with rounded, triradiate ridges on the distal surface.

=== Asexual reproduction ===
S. papillosum can also establish through asexual reproduction by the fragmentation of its stems and branches.

== Uses and economic importance ==
S. papillosum is a major peat-forming moss, dominant in peatlands that are mined for horticultural purposes, as peat is a popular growing medium for ornamental plants. An alternative to peat mining is Sphagnum farming, which is the commercial practice of cultivating and harvesting Sphagnum moss. In particular, S. papillosum has been observed to establish well on restored bog grasslands that could potentially be used for Sphagnum farming. S. papillosum has also been observed to regenerate after cutting when tested for harvesting techniques; therefore, it may provide a potentially renewable and environmentally friendly alternative to peat mining.

== Conservation ==
The IUCN classifies the species as Least concern due to its common occurrence across its wide geographic range, but several local populations (e.g. in Romania, Slovakia and Serbia) are considered threatened.
