= Deergrass =

Deergrass or deer grass is a common name for several plants and may refer to:

- Muhlenbergia rigens - a perennial bunchgrass native to the southwestern United States and Mexico
- Rhexia - a genus of plants in the family Melastomataceae
- Trichophorum cespitosum - a species in the sedge family native to Europe, Asia and North America
