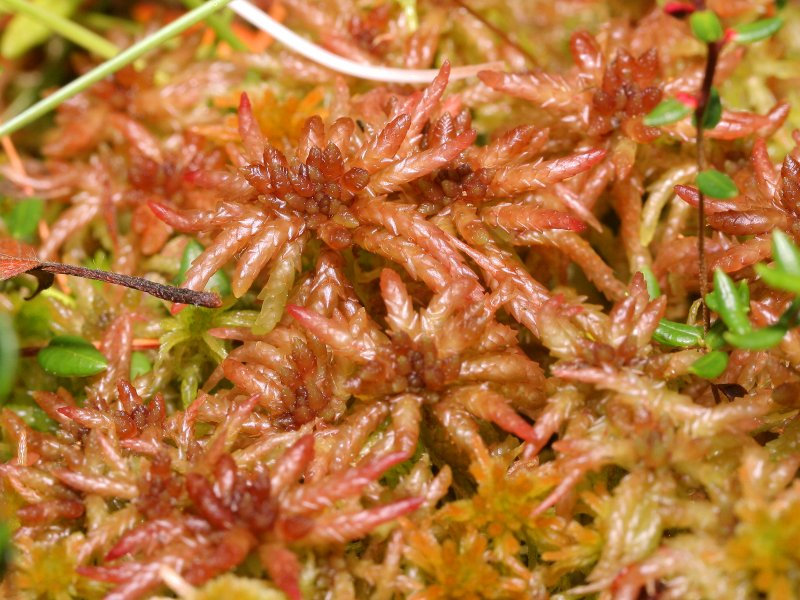

Scientific classification
- Kingdom: Plantae
- Division: Bryophyta
- Class: Sphagnopsida
- Subclass: Sphagnidae
- Order: Sphagnales
- Family: Sphagnaceae
- Genus: Sphagnum
- Species: S. magellanicum

Binomial name
- Sphagnum magellanicum Brid.

Synonyms
- Sphagnum amoenum Warnst.; Sphagnum andinum Hampe; Sphagnum aureum C.B. McQueen; Sphagnum cymbifolium var. magellanicum (Brid.) P. Beauv.; Sphagnum grandirete Warnst.; Sphagnum loricatum Müll. Hal.; Sphagnum medium Limpr; Sphagnum monzonense Warnst.; Sphagnum palustre subsp. magellanicum (Brid.) Bott.; Sphagnum palustre var. medium Sendtn.; Sphagnum rigescens Warnst.; Sphagnum stewartii Warnst.; Sphagnum tursum Müll. Hal.; Sphagnum vesiculare Müll. Hal. & Warnst.; Sphagnum wallisii Müll. Hal.

= Sphagnum magellanicum =

Species of moss

Sphagnum magellanicum, commonly called Magellanic bogmoss, Magellan's sphagnum, Magellan's peatmoss or midway peat moss, is a widespread species of moss found in wet boreal forest in the far south and southwest of South America and in northern North America and Eurasia.

== Description ==
The red-purple colour visible all or parts of the leaves is very distinctive. It forms low cushions and mats within freshwater bogs.

== Conservation ==
In the 2010s Sphagnum peat in Chile has begun to be harvested at large scales for export to countries like Japan, South Korea, Taiwan and the United States. Given Sphagnums property to absorb excess water and release it during dry months harvesting of Sphagnum, means that overexploitation may threaten the water supply in the fjords and channels of Chile. Extraction of Sphagnum in Chile is regulated by law since August 2, 2018. Since 2018 Chilean law allows only for the manual extraction of Sphagnum using only pitchforks or similar tools as aid. In a given area (polygon) at least 30% of Sphagnum coverage has to be left unharvested. Harvested Sphagnum fibers may not exceed 15 cm in length and the remaining Sphagnum after harvest may never have a length less than 5 cm over the water table. In the regions of Los Ríos (40°S) and Los Lagos (41–43°S) the same plots may be harvested after 12 years, while further south in Aysén (44–48°S) and Magallanes (49–56°S) 85 years have to pass before the same area is harvested again.

In Iceland, the species is found at only two locations and has the conservation status of a vulnerable species (VU).

== Response to herbicide exposure ==
In a study of the effect of the herbicide Asulam on moss growth, Sphagnum magellanicum was shown to have intermediate sensitivity to Asulam exposure.
