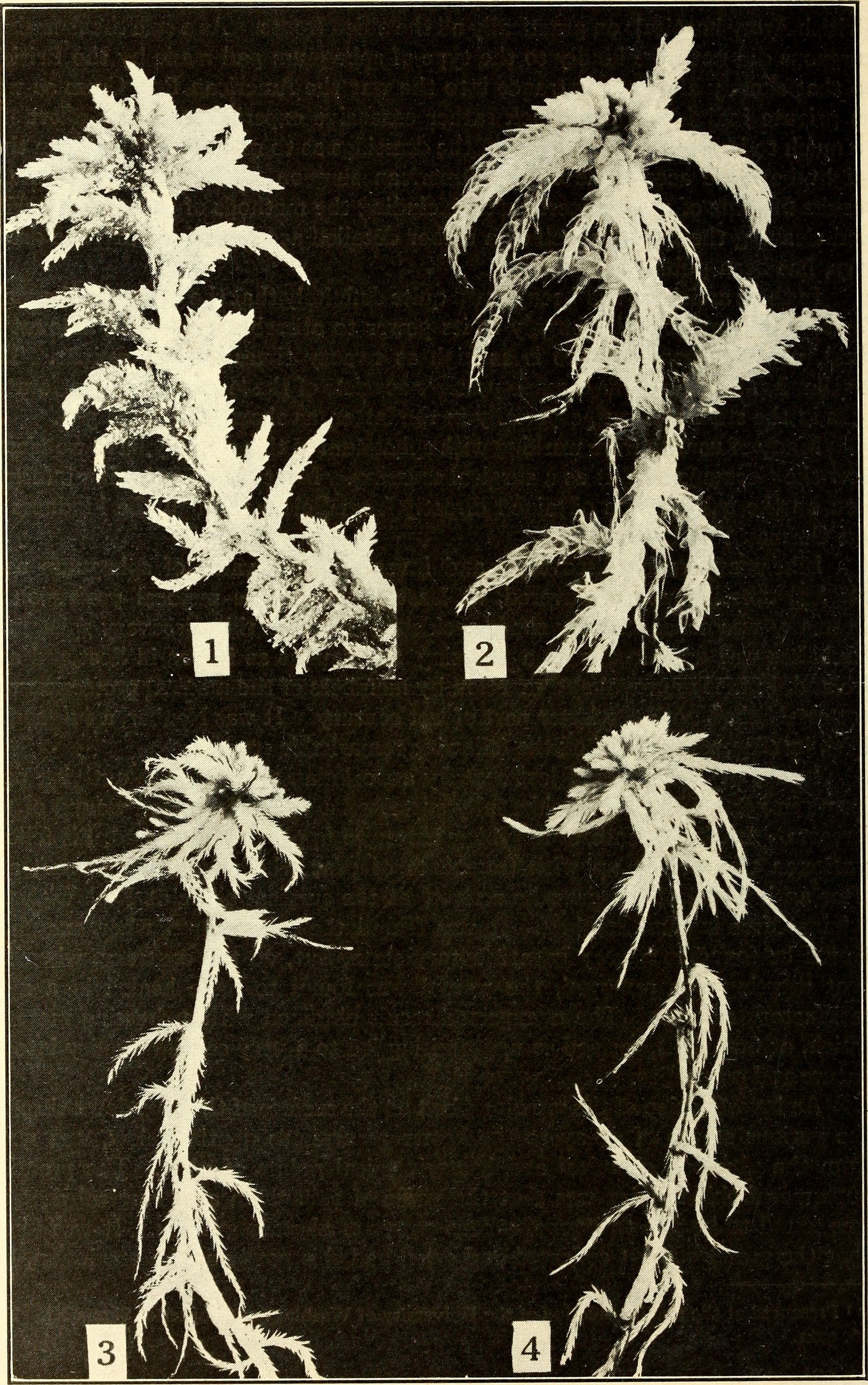
- From a 1920 article on the use of Sphagnum in surgery. Sphagnum imbricatum, upper left, is noted as suitable for dressings.

Scientific classification
- Kingdom: Plantae
- Clade: Embryophytes
- Division: Bryophyta
- Class: Sphagnopsida
- Order: Sphagnales
- Family: Sphagnaceae
- Genus: Sphagnum
- Species: S. imbricatum

Binomial name
- Sphagnum imbricatum Hornschuch ex. Russow

Synonyms
- Sphagnum austinii var. glaucum Roll; Sphagnum austinii var. imbricatum (Hornsch. ex Russow) Lindb.; Sphagnum degenerans Warnst.

= Sphagnum imbricatum =

Species of moss

Sphagnum imbricatum is a species of moss in the family Sphagnaceae, native to cool temperate parts of Europe and eastern North America, and found sporadically elsewhere. In the past it was used as a substitute for cotton in surgical dressings.
