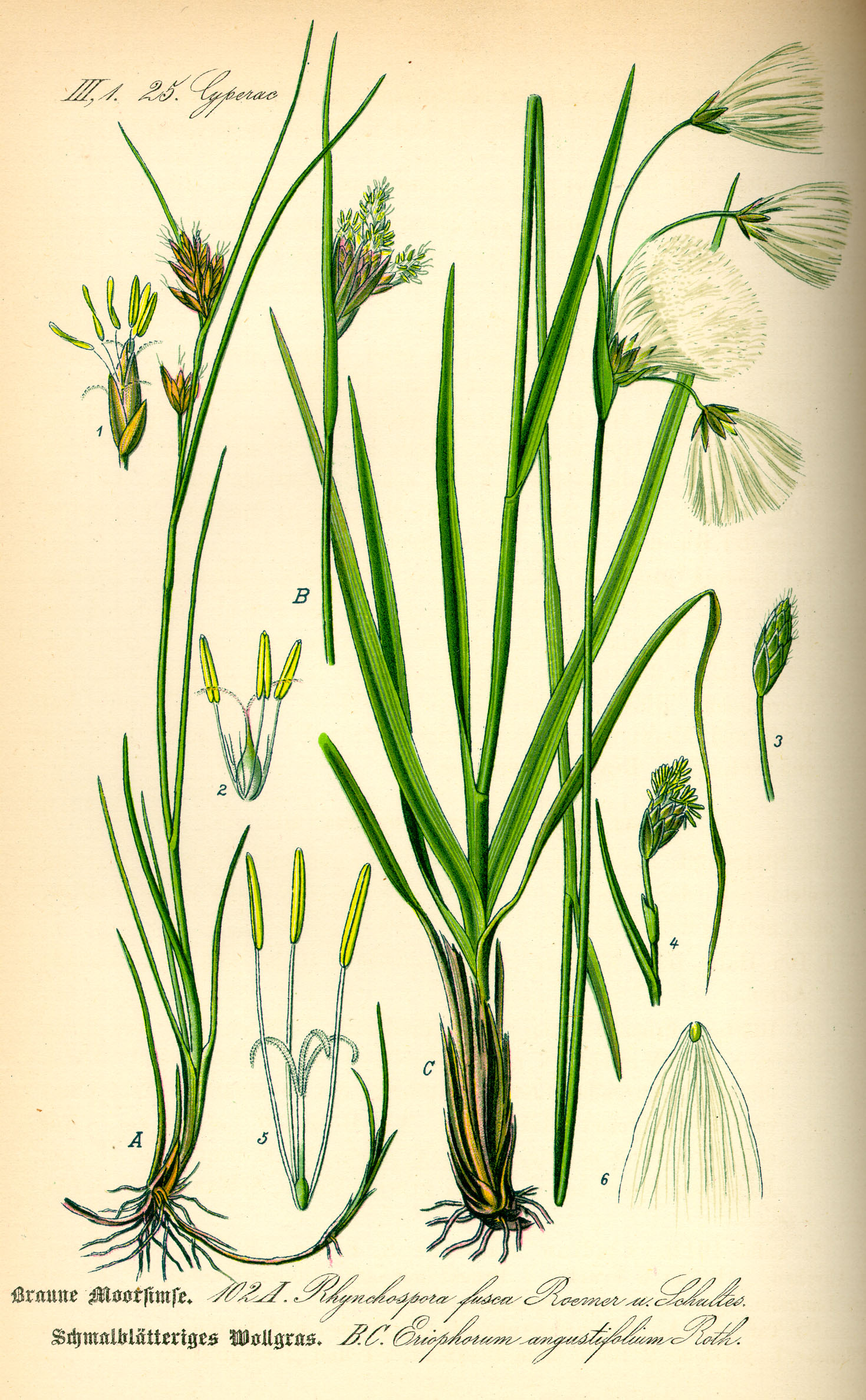
- Rhynchospora fusca (left)

Scientific classification
- Kingdom: Plantae
- Clade: Tracheophytes
- Clade: Angiosperms
- Clade: Monocots
- Clade: Commelinids
- Order: Poales
- Family: Cyperaceae
- Genus: Rhynchospora
- Species: R. fusca

Binomial name
- Rhynchospora fusca (L.) W.T.Aiton

= Rhynchospora fusca =

Species of grass-like plant

Rhynchospora fusca (vernacular name: brown beaksedge or brown beak-sedge) is a species of sedge belonging to the family Cyperaceae.

The native range of R. fusca is Europe, Central and Eastern Canada to Northern Central and Eastern USA. It grows to approximately 20 inches (0.51 m) tall, with brown spikelets that bloom from June through November.
