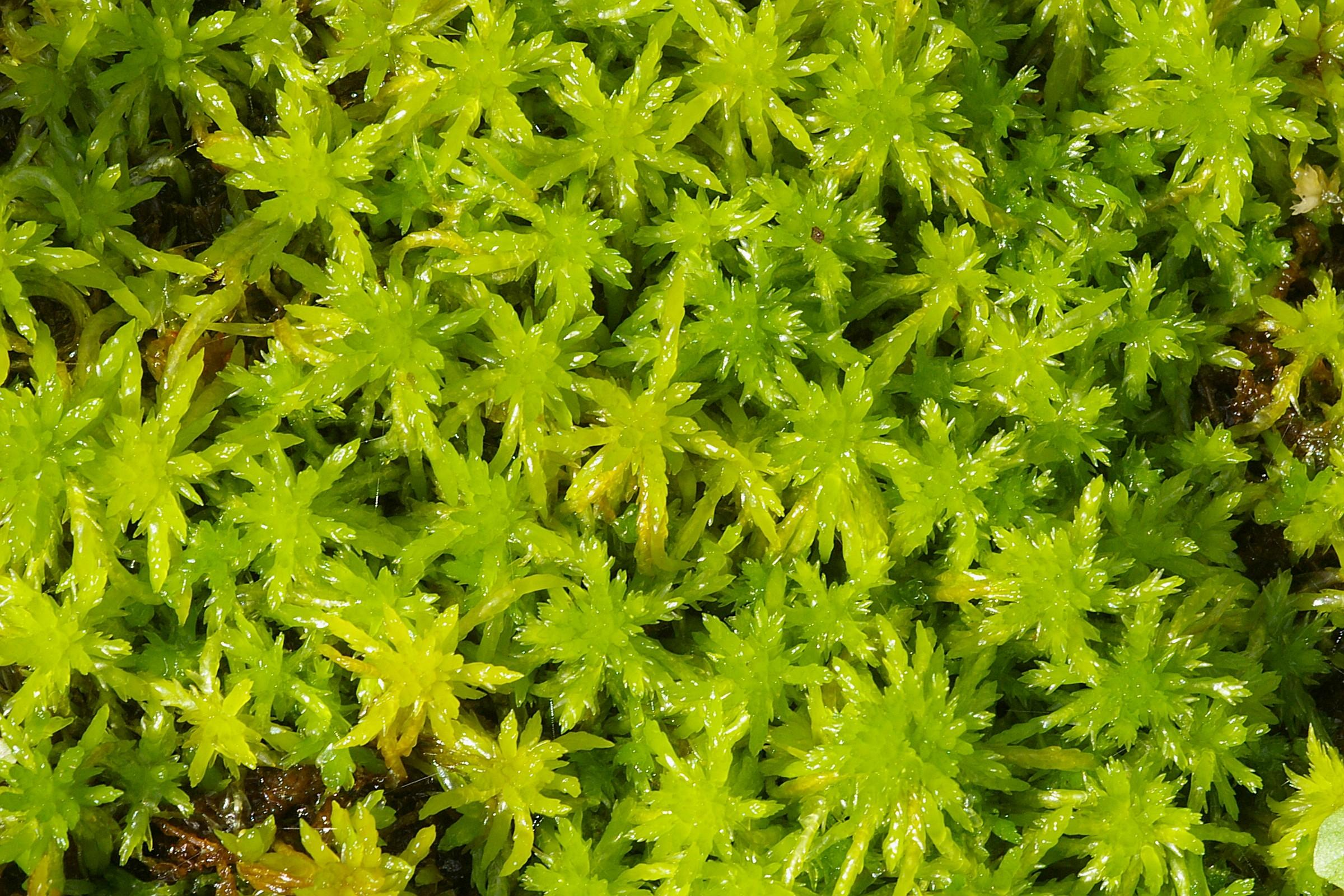
- A clump of Sphagnum, peat moss

Scientific classification
- Kingdom: Plantae
- Division: Bryophyta
- Class: Sphagnopsida
- Order: Sphagnales
- Family: Sphagnaceae; Dumort.

Genera
- Sphagnophyllites †; Sphagnum

= Sphagnaceae =

Peat moss Temporal range: Triassic to recent

Family of mosses

The Sphagnaceae is a family of moss with only one living genus Sphagnum.
