= Cré na Cille (film) =

Irish film (2007)

- DVD cover
- Directed by: Robert Quinn
- Written by: Robert Quinn; Macdara Ó Fátharta
- Based on: Cré na Cille by Máirtín Ó Cadhain
- Produced by: Mickey Walsh; Ciarán Ó Cofaigh
- Starring: Bríd Ní Neachtain; Peadar Lamb; Máire Ní Mháille; Macdara Ó Fátharta; Joe Steve Ó Neachtain; Diarmuid Mac an Adhastair; Máire Uí Dhroighneáin; Tom Sailí Ó Flaithearta; Peadar Ó Treasaigh; Máirín Uí Neachtain; Dara Devaney; Seán Ó Coisdealbha; Mairéad Ní Chuaig; Pádraic Ó Tuairisc; Mícheál Ó Conaola
- Cinematography: Tim Fleming
- Edited by: Conall de Cléir
- Music by: Jim Lockhart
- Production company: ROSG
- Release date: February 17, 2007
- Running time: 92 minutes
- Country: Ireland
- Language: Irish
- Budget: €1,200,000

Cré na Cille is a 2007 Irish language film directed by Robert Quinn. It is an adaptation of Máirtín Ó Cadhain's 1949 novel, Cré na Cille. It was released outside Ireland under the English title Graveyard Clay.

== Production ==
Cré na Cille was filmed in various locations in Connemara, County Galway in 2006 to commemorate the centenary of Ó Cadhain's birth. It was filmed with HDCAM in a 2.35:1 aspect ratio and with Dolby Digital sound.

== Plot ==
In a graveyard in Connemara, as the members of a small community die, their spirits linger on in the grave and can speak to each other.

== Release ==
Cré na Cille premiered in Galway in December 2006.

It screened at the 2007 Shanghai International Film Festival (shortlisted for the Jin Jue Award) and at the Irish Film Festival, Boston.

Cré na Cille won an award for Outstanding Services to the Irish Language at the 2007 Aisling Awards.

It premiered on television on TG4 on Saint Stephen's Day, 2007.

Bríd Ní Neachtain's performance was highly praised by critics.

== Awards ==
Awards	Category	Recipients	Result
Irish Film & Television Awards	Best Director	Robert Quinn	Nominated
Irish Film & Television Awards	Best Actress in a Lead Role	Bríd Ní Neachtain	Nominated
Irish Film & Television Awards	Best Original Score	Jim Lockhart	Nominated
Irish Film & Television Awards	Special Irish Language Award	Cré na Cille	Nominated

== Legacy ==
Dr Seán Crosson of the University of Galway observed that "It was remarked to me by one of those involved in the production of Cré na Cille, for example, that if it had not been made this year, it would have been increasingly difficult for the work ever to have been successfully adapted as fluent speakers of the richly textured and complex Irish found in Ó Cadhain's masterpiece become more difficult to find."

Actress Bríd Ní Neachtain appeared on an Irish 55 cent stamp in 2008, depicted in a still from Cré na Cille.
