= Tim Robinson (cartographer) =

English writer, artist, and cartographer (1935–2020)

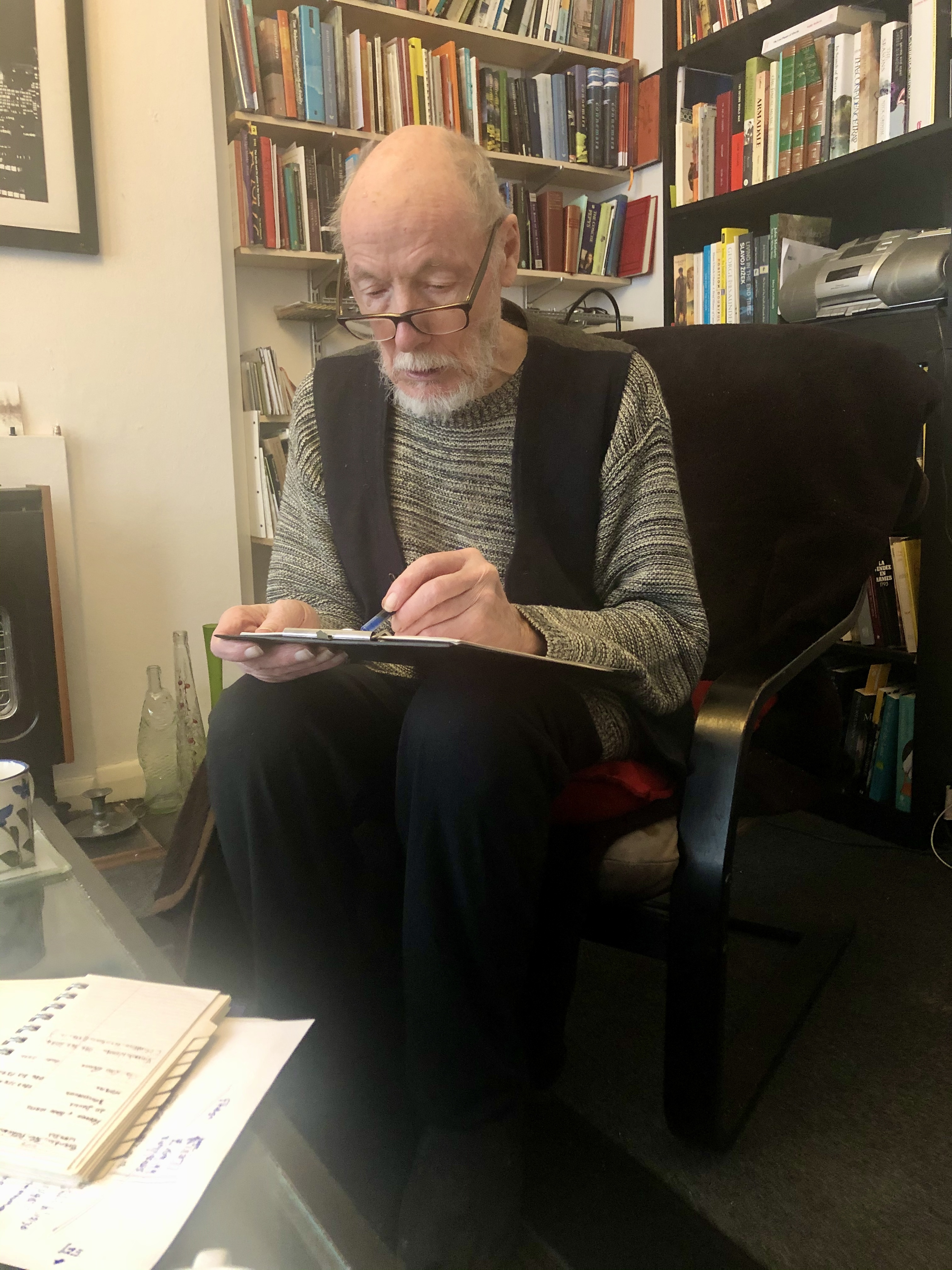
- Tim Drever, London 2019 by John Drever
- Born: 1935; Yorkshire, England
- Died: 3 April 2020 (aged 85); London, England
- Education: Sidney Sussex College, Cambridge

Timothy Drever Robinson (1935 – 3 April 2020) was an English writer, artist and cartographer. His most famous works include books about Ireland's Aran Islands and Connemara, in the West of Ireland. He was also well known for producing exceptionally detailed maps of the Aran Islands, The Burren, and Connemara, what he called "the ABC of earth wonders".

== Early life and education ==
Born in England, he studied mathematics at Sidney Sussex College, Cambridge.

== Career ==
After a career as a visual artist using the name Timothy Drever, in Istanbul, Vienna and London, he settled in the Aran Islands, off the coast of County Galway in the 1970s, and began a detailed study of the landscape of the West Region, Ireland.

Robinson produced his first map of the Aran Islands in 1975 with a second edition in 1980, and "Oileáin Árainn", an accompaniment to the map in 1996. After his initial map of Aran, in 1977, he produced a two-inch map of the uplands of North-West Clare, covering The Burren, with a second edition in 1999. In 1981, Robinson began to turn his attention to Connemara, writing a pamphlet, later expanded into a book, called "Setting Foot on the Shores of Connemara". There followed a series of recurring articles in the Connacht Tribune under the title "Mapping South Connemara". In 1990, Robinson published his 1-inch map of Connemara with an accompanying gazetteer. Like the other two regional maps, these were published by Folding Landscapes, the specialist publishing house and information centre Tim and his wife Máiréad ran from their Roundstone base.

Tim Robinson was elected Parnell Visiting Fellow for 2011, at Magdalene College, Cambridge. He delivered the annual Parnell Lecture in February 2011. Its title is ‘A Land without Shortcuts’, and it was published in the Dublin Review.

His two-volume study of the Aran Islands, Stones of Aran, is a much-praised compendium of topographical and cultural lore, described by Michael Viney as "One of the most original, revelatory and exhilarating works of literature ever produced in Ireland." Stones of Aran: Pilgrimage follows the form of a coastal exploration, while Stones of Aran: Labyrinth explores the interior.

His most recent work was the publication of a three-volume study of Connemara called Listening to the Wind, A Little Gaelic Kingdom, and The Last Pool of Darkness. He was a member of the Irish arts organisation Aosdána.

Robinson won two Irish Book Awards: the 2007 Argosy Irish Non-Fiction Book of the Year for Connemara: Listening to the Wind, and the 2011 International Education Services Best Irish-Published Book of the Year for Connemara: A Little Gaelic Kingdom. Liam Mac Con Iomaire and Tim Robinson won the 2016 Lois Roth Award for a Translation of a Literary Work for Graveyard Clay / Cré na Cille: A Narrative in Ten Interludes, by Máirtín Ó Cadhain (Yale Univ. Press, 2016). Connemara: Listening to the Wind was also short-listed for the Royal Society of Literature’s Ondaatje Prize 2007 (awarded to books of any genre that evoke the spirit of a place).

Tim Robinson was the focus of a poetic film by Pat Collins, Tim Robinson – Connemara (Harvest Films 2011) with original music by Susan Stenger: "An exploration of landscape, history and mythology – this film acts as an intersection between writing, film-making and the natural world".

== Personal life ==
Robinson died at St Pancras Hospital on 3 April 2020 at the age of 85, as a result of COVID-19 during the pandemic in the United Kingdom. Robinson died two weeks after the death of his wife and collaborator Máiréad Robinson. Their ashes were scattered in the ocean off Roundstone Quay in Connemara, Ireland on November 5, 2022. Tim was a maternal cousin of experimental physicist Ronald Drever and uncle of acoustic ecologist and sound artist, John Levack Drever.

== Principal publications ==
- Map of Árainn (Connacht Tribune, 1975, and 1980)
- The Burren: A Map of the Uplands of North-West County Clare (1977)
- Stones of Aran: Pilgrimage (The Lilliput Press, 1986)
- Connemara: A One-Inch Map, with Introduction and Gazetteer (Folding Landscapes, 1990)
- Mementos of Mortality: the cenotaphs of funerary cairns of Arainn (Folding Landscapes, 1991)
- Conamara Theas: Áit agus Ainm, Tim Robinson and Liam Mac Con Iomaire (Coiscéim, 1992)
- Stones of Aran: Labyrinth (Lilliput Press, 1995)
- Connemara after the famine: journal of a survey of the Martin Estate by Thomas Colville Scott, 1853 with an introduction from Tim Robinson (Lilliput Press, 1995)
- Oileáin Arann: A Map of the Aran Islands, with a Companion to the Map (Folding Landscapes, 1996)
- Setting Foot on the Shores of Connemara (The Lilliput Press, 1996)
- The View from the Horizon (Coracle, 1997)
- The Burren: A Map of the Uplands of North-West County Clare (Folding Landscapes, 1999)
- My Time in Space (The Lilliput Press, 2001)
- Tales and Imaginings (The Lilliput Press, 2002)
- Connemara: Listening to the Wind (Penguin Ireland, 2006)
- Connemara: The Last Pool of Darkness (Penguin Ireland, 2008)
- Connemara: A Little Gaelic Kingdom (Penguin Ireland, 2011)
- Graveyard Clay (with Liam Mac Con Iomaire), Translated from the original Connaught Irish Máirtín Ó Cadhain novel Cré na Cille (Yale University Press, 2015)
- Conamara Chronicles Tales from Iorras Aithneach (with Liam Mac Con Iomaire), Translated from the original Seán Mac Giollarnáth (Indiana University Press, 2022)

== Exhibitions ==
Timothy Drever/ Tim Robinson

- 1963 Galerie Fuchs, Vienna
- 1965 John Moores Exhibition: Walker Art Gallery, Liverpool
- 1966 ‘Soundings 3’: Signals Gallery, London
- 1967 First Edinburgh 100
- 1968 25 Camden Artists: Central Library, Swiss Cottage, London
- 1968 ‘The Dreams of Euclid' and 'Four Multiple Cosmagnetics’, Lisson Gallery, London (with Ken Cox, Michael Ginsborg, Dom Sylvester Houédard, Peter Joseph, Li Yuan-Chia, Mira Schendel, Peter Schmidt)
- 1969 ‘Four-colour Theorm’: Environmental art at Kenwood, London (with Peter Joseph)
- 1969 Survey 69 New Space, Camden Arts Centre (with Ed Herring, Peter Joseph and David Parsons) Tim Robinson
- 1997 ‘The Event Horizon’, 1997, curated by Michael Tarantino
- 2005 ‘Distressed Map of the Aran Islands’, Vinyl, Cork 2005 Capital of Culture curated by Simon Cutts
- 2010 ‘Distressed Map of the Aran Islands’, Map Marathon, Map Room of the Royal Geographical Society curated by Hans Ulrich Obrist
- 2011 ‘The Decision’ The Hugh Lane
- 2016 IMMA Collection: A Decade, IMMA
- 2017 Coastlines, IMMA
- 2018 Signals: If You Like I Shall Grow, Kurimanzutto, London

== Collections ==
- Albertina, Vienna
- Art Council of Great Britain
- Victoria & Albert Museum, London
- Tate Britain
- The Irish Museum of Modern Art (IMMA)
- The Royal Irish Academy

== Archives ==
- List for Tim and Máiréad Robinson's Archive at National University of Ireland, Galway
