= Conghail =

Conghail is a surname. Notable people with the surname include:

- Fiach Mac Conghail (born 1964), Irish theatre director and politician
- Muiris Mac Conghail (1941–2019), Irish journalist, writer, broadcaster, poet, and film-maker

== See also ==
- Congal (disambiguation)
