= Fionnuala Ní Fhlatharta =

Irish actress

Fionnuala Ní Fhlatharta is an Irish actress. She is best known for her role as Bernie in the Irish language television drama Ros na Rún.

== Biography ==
Ní Fhlatharta has played the role of cafe owner Bernie Ní Neachtain Seoighe on Ros na Rún since the pilot episode in 1992. Her first acting experience was playing Niamh while at National School. She later attended the National University of Ireland, Galway, where she acted in the Drama Society and studied under Stanislavski's system. Her stage credits include The Field, a dramatisation of Cré na Cille (based on the novel by Máirtín Ó Cadhain) and a production of The Merchant of Venice. More recently Fionnuala appeared in "Cinneadh an Circe", an Irish language translation of Jimmy Murphy's The Hen Night Epiphany, at An Taibhdhearc in Galway.

Her pastimes include woodturning, writing and basketball. She is the niece of actor Tom Sailí Ó Flaithearta, who portrays Coilín in Ros na Rún.

== See also ==
- Ó Flaithbertaigh
