= Ciarán Ó Cofaigh =

Irish film director and producer

Ciarán Ó Cofaigh is an Irish film director and producer.

== Biography ==
A native of Ráth Cairn, County Meath, but resident in Indreabhán, County Galway, Ó Cofaigh has worked in the Irish film and broadcast industry for almost thirty years, and is co-founder and managing director of ROSG. He began by enrolling on a producer/director course established by Údarás na Gaeltachta and RTÉ. Following this he worked freelance on productions for RTÉ and BBC NI.

Ciarán is an experienced producer/director/animator, both in film and television. Amongst his award-winning productions are the feature film Cré na Cille (Graveyard Clay); the supernatural thriller series, Na Cloigne (The Heads), the animate series Scéal na Gaeilge (The Story of the Irish Language/Gaelic), the thriller series An Bronntanas (The Gift) and the docu-drama feature Murdair Mhám Trasna (The Mám Trasna Murders). Ciarán is currently in production on the feature docu-drama, Avenger Ghaoth Dobhair (Gaoth Dobhair Avenger).

He co-founded ROSG (Old Irish rosg, meaning eye) in 1998, a film and television company based in An Spidéal. ROSG has since produced a wide variety of films, drama, documentaries and even animations, winning national and international awards for their work.

He also co-founded and produced the Siol Scéal initiative of short films, a development scheme established by ROSG and Eo Teilifís to promote new talented writers and directors. From this scheme 24 half-hour short films have been produced and broadcast to date.

Ciarán has also tutored in Television and Broadcasting in University College Galway.

Ó Cofaigh produced an adaptation of the novel Cré na Cille, by Máirtín Ó Cadhain, starring Bríd Ní Neachtain. It was viewed at a number of Irish and global film festivals such as the Shanghai International Film Festival.

== See also ==
- Ó Cobhthaigh
