= Irish phonology =

Phonology of the Irish language

Map of the Irish-speaking areas of Ireland. Places mentioned in this article are named on the map.

Irish phonology varies from dialect to dialect; there is no standard pronunciation of Irish. Therefore, this article focuses on phenomena shared by most or all dialects, and on the major differences among the dialects. Detailed discussion of the dialects can be found in the specific articles: Ulster Irish, Connacht Irish, and Munster Irish.

Irish phonology has been studied as a discipline since the late 19th century, with numerous researchers publishing descriptive accounts of dialects from all regions where the language is spoken. More recently, Irish phonology has been a focus of theoretical linguists.

One of the most important aspects of Irish phonology is that almost all consonants (except /h/) come in pairs, a "broad" and a "slender" pronunciation. Broad consonants are either velarized (◌ˠ; back of tongue is pulled back and slightly up in the direction of the soft palate during articulation) or simply velar (for example, /k ɡ/). Slender consonants are palatalized (◌ʲ; tongue pushed up towards the hard palate during articulation). The contrast between broad and slender consonants is crucial in Irish, because the meaning of a word can change if a broad consonant is substituted for a slender consonant or vice versa. For example, the only difference in pronunciation between the words bó ('cow') and beo ('alive') is that bó is pronounced with broad /bˠ/, while beo is pronounced with slender /bʲ/. The contrast between broad and slender consonants plays a critical role not only in distinguishing the individual consonants themselves, but also in the pronunciation of the surrounding vowels, in the determination of which consonants can stand next to each other, and in the behaviour of words that begin with a vowel. This broad/slender distinction is similar to the hard/soft one of several Slavic languages, like Russian.

Irish shares a number of phonological characteristics with its nearest linguistic relatives, Scottish Gaelic and Manx, as well as with Hiberno-English, which it currently has the most language contact with.

== History of the discipline ==
Title page of Die araner mundart. Ein beitrag zur erforschung des westirischen ('The Aran dialect. A contribution to the study of West Irish') (Finck 1899).

Until the end of the 19th century, linguistic discussions of Irish focused either on the traditional grammar (issues like the inflection of nouns, verbs and adjectives) or on the historical development of sounds from Proto-Indo-European through Proto-Celtic to Old Irish. The first descriptive analysis of the phonology of an Irish dialect was Finck (1899), which was based on the author's fieldwork in the Aran Islands. This was followed by Quiggin (1906), a phonetic description of the dialect of Meenawannia near Glenties, County Donegal. Pedersen (1909) is predominantly a historical account, but has some description of modern dialects as well. Alf Sommerfelt published early descriptions of Ulster dialects (Sommerfelt 1922 and Sommerfelt 1965 for the village of Torr in Gweedore, Sommerfelt 1927, and Sommerfelt 1929 for the now extinct dialect of South Armagh). The dialect of Dunquin on the Dingle Peninsula in Munster was described by Sjoestedt (1931). From 1944 to 1968 the Dublin Institute for Advanced Studies published a series of monographs, each describing the phonology of one local dialect: Ó Cuív (1944) for West Muskerry in County Cork (Ballyvourney, Coolea and vicinity), de Bhaldraithe (1966) (first published 1945) for Cois Fhairrge in County Galway (Barna, Spiddal, Inverin and vicinity), Breatnach (1947) for An Rinn in County Waterford, de Búrca (1958) for Tourmakeady in County Mayo, Wagner (1959) for Teelin, County Donegal, Mhac an Fhailigh (1968) for Erris in County Mayo. More recent descriptive phonology has been published by Lucas (1979) for Rosguill in northern Donegal, Hughes (1986) for Tangaveane and Commeen (also near Glenties), Ó Curnáin (1996) for Iorras Aithneach in Connemara (Kilkieran and vicinity) and Ó Sé (2000) for the Dingle Peninsula, County Kerry.

Research into the theoretical phonology of Irish began with Ó Siadhail & Wigger (1975), which follows the principles and practices of Chomsky and Halle's The Sound Pattern of English and which formed the basis of the phonology sections of Ó Siadhail (1989). Dissertations examining Irish phonology from a theoretical point of view include Ní Chiosáin (1991), Green (1997) in optimality theory, and Cyran (1997) and Bloch-Rozmej (1998) in government phonology.

== Consonants ==
Most dialects of Irish contain at a minimum the consonant phonemes shown in the following chart (see International Phonetic Alphabet for an explanation of the symbols). The consonant /h/ is neither broad nor slender.

Consonant phonemes
		Labial		Coronal		Dorsal		Glottal
		broad	slender	broad	slender	broad	slender	Glottal
Stop	voiceless	pˠ	pʲ	t̪ˠ	tʲ	k	c	
Stop	voiced	bˠ	bʲ	d̪ˠ	dʲ	ɡ	ɟ	
Continuant	voiceless	ɸˠ	ɸʲ	sˠ	ʃ	x	ç	h
Continuant	voiced	w	βʲ	l̪ˠ	lʲ	ɣ	j	
Nasal		mˠ	mʲ	n̪ˠ	nʲ	ŋ	ɲ	
Tap				ɾˠ	ɾʲ			

=== On- and offglides ===
Broad (velar or velarized) consonants have a noticeable velar offglide ([ɰ]; a very short vowel-like sound) before front vowels, which sounds like the English /w/ but without rounding. Thus naoi /n̪ˠiː/ ('nine') and caoi /kiː/ ('way, manner') are pronounced [n̪ˠɰiː] and [kɰiː], respectively. This velar offglide is labialized (pronounced [w]) after labial consonants, so buí /bˠiː/ ('yellow') is pronounced [bˠwiː].

Similarly, slender (palatal or palatalized) consonants have a palatal offglide ([j]; like English ⟨y⟩) before back vowels, e.g. tiubh /tʲuː/ ('thick') is pronounced [tʲjuː].

When a broad consonant follows a front vowel, there is a very short vowel sound [ə̯] (called an onglide) just before the consonant, e.g. díol /dʲiːl̪ˠ/ ('sell') is pronounced [dʲiːə̯l̪ˠ]. Similarly, when a slender consonant follows a back vowel, there is an onglide [i̯] before the consonant, e.g. áit /aːtʲ/ ('place') is pronounced [aːi̯tʲ],óil /oːlʲ/ ('drinking' gen.) is pronounced [oːi̯lʲ], meabhair /mʲəuɾʲ/ ('understanding') is [mʲəui̯ɾʲ], and dúinn /d̪ˠuːn̠ʲ/ ('to us') is [d̪ˠuːi̯n̠ʲ].

=== Allophones ===
/w/ (written as ⟨bh, mh(, v)⟩) has two basic allophones: the labiovelar approximant [w] and the velarized voiced labiodental fricative [vˠ]. The distribution of these allophones varies from dialect to dialect. In Munster, generally only [vˠ] is found, and in Ulster generally only [w] is found. In Connacht, [w] is found word-initially before vowels (e.g. bhfuil [wɪlʲ] 'is') and [vˠ] in other positions (e.g. naomh [n̪ˠiːvˠ] 'saint', fómhar [ˈfˠuːvˠəɾˠ] 'autumn', and bhrostaigh [ˈvˠɾˠɔsˠt̪ˠə] 'hurried').

The remaining labial fricatives are typically labiodental [fˠ, fʲ, vʲ], but they as well as the fricative allophone [vˠ] of /w/ have bilabial allophones [ɸˠ, ɸʲ, βˠ, βʲ] in many dialects; the distribution depends partly on environment (bilabials are more likely to be found adjacent to rounded vowels) and partly on the individual speaker.

Most coronals are alveolar, except broad stops and approximants which are typically dental [t̪ˠ, d̪ˠ, n̪ˠ, l̪ˠ], and the slender fricative is typically postalveolar [ʃ]. /tʲ, dʲ/ may be realized as alveolo-palatal affricates [tɕ, dʑ] in a number of dialects, including Tourmakeady, Erris, and Teelin.

/c, ɟ, ɲ/ may be true palatals [c, ɟ, ɲ] or palatovelars [k̟, ɡ˖, ŋ˖].

/j/ has three allophones in most dialects: a palatal approximant [j] before vowels (except /iː/) and syllable-finally (e.g. dheas [jasˠ] 'nice', beidh [bʲɛj] 'will be'); a voiced (post)palatal fricative [ʝ] before consonants (e.g. ghrian [ʝɾʲiən̪ˠ] 'sun'); and an intermediate sound [j˔] (with more frication than [j] but less frication than [ʝ]) before /iː/ (e.g. dhírigh [j˔iːɾʲə] 'straightened').

/ɾʲ/ has the primary allophone [ɹ̝ʲ], a palatalized postalveolar fricative.

In many varieties, /x/ and /ç/ alternate with /h/ under a variety of circumstances. For example, as the lenition of /tʲ/ and /ʃ/, /h/ is replaced by [ç] before back vowels, e.g. thabharfainn /ˈçuːɾˠhən̠ʲ/^{6} ('I would give'), sheoil /çoːlʲ/ ('drove'). In Munster, /ç/ becomes [h] after a vowel, e.g. fiche [ˈfʲɪhə] ('twenty'). In Ring, final /h/ becomes [x] in monosyllabic words, e.g. scáth [sˠkaːx] ('fear'). In some Ulster varieties, e.g. Tory Island, /x/ can be replaced by [h], e.g. cha [ha] ('not'), be deleted word-finally or before /t̪ˠ/, e.g. santach [ˈsˠan̪ˠt̪ˠa(h)] ('greedy') and seacht [ʃat̪ˠ] ('seven').

As in English, voiceless stops are aspirated (articulated with a puff of air immediately upon release) at the start of a word, while voiced stops may be incompletely voiced but are never aspirated. Voiceless stops are unaspirated after /sˠ/ and /ʃ/ (e.g. scanradh [sˠkauɾˠə]^{1} 'terror'); however, stops remain aspirated after the clitic is /sˠ/ (e.g. is cam [sˠkʰaum] 'it's crooked'). Several researchers (e.g. Ó Cuív 1944, Wagner 1959, de Bhaldraithe 1966, Mhac an Fhailigh 1968, and Ó Sé 2000) use transcriptions like /sb sd sɡ xd/, etc., indicating they consider the stops that occur after voiceless fricatives to be devoiced allophones of the voiced stops rather than unaspirated allophones of the voiceless stops, but this is a minority view.

=== Fortis and lenis sonorants ===
In Old Irish, the sonorants (those spelled ⟨l, n, r, m⟩) were divided not only into broad and slender types, but also into fortis and lenis types. The precise phonetic definition of these terms is somewhat vague, but the coronal fortis sounds (spelled ⟨l, n, r⟩) were probably longer in duration and may have had a larger area of contact between the tongue and the roof of the mouth than the lenis sounds. Fortis ⟨m⟩ was probably a normal [m], while lenis ⟨m⟩ was a nasalized semivowel [w̃], perhaps tending towards a nasalized fricative [ṽ] or [β̃] when palatalized. By convention, the fortis coronals are transcribed with small capital letters ⟨ʟ, ɴ, ʀ⟩ or capital letters ⟨L, N, R⟩, the lenis with lower case ⟨l, n, r⟩ (some authors, such as Stifter 2006, instead use Latin ⟨l, n, r, m⟩ for fortis and Greek ⟨λ, ν, ρ, μ⟩ for lenis). Thus Old Irish had four rhotic phonemes /Rˠ, Rʲ, rˠ, rʲ/, four lateral phonemes /Lˠ, Lʲ, lˠ, lʲ/, and four coronal nasal phonemes /Nˠ, Nʲ, nˠ, nʲ/. Fortis and lenis sonorants contrasted with each other between vowels and word-finally after vowels in Old Irish, e.g. berraid /bʲeRˠɨðʲ/ ('he shears') vs. beraid /bʲerˠɨðʲ/ ('he may carry'); coll /koLˠ/ ('hazel') vs. col /kolˠ/ ('sin'); sonn /sˠoNˠ/ ('stake') vs. son /sˠonˠ/ ('sound'). Word-initially, only the fortis sounds were found, but they became lenis in environments where morphosyntactically triggered lenition was found: rún /Rˠuːnˠ/ ('mystery') vs. a rún /a rˠuːnˠ/ ('his mystery'), lón /Lˠoːnˠ/ ('provision') vs. a lón /a lˠoːnˠ/ ('his provision').

In the modern language, the four rhotics have been reduced to two in all dialects, /Rˠ, Rʲ, rˠ/ having merged as /ɾˠ/. For the laterals and nasals, some dialects have kept all four distinct, while others have reduced them to three or two distinct phonemes, as summarized in the following table.

Old Irish	Ulster		Connacht			Munster	
Old Irish	Rosguill	Glenties	Erris	Connemara	Aran	Dingle Peninsula	West Muskerry
Rˠ	ɾˠ						
rˠ	ɾˠ						
Rʲ	ɾˠ						
rʲ	ɾʲ						
Lˠ	l̪ˠ	l̪ˠ		l̪ˠ	l̪ˠ	l̪ˠ	
lˠ	l̪ˠ	lˠ		l̪ˠ	l	l̪ˠ	
lʲ	l	lʲ			l	lʲ	
Lʲ	l̠ʲ					lʲ	
Nˠ	n̪ˠ	n̪ˠ		n̪ˠ	n̪ˠ	n̪ˠ	
nˠ	n̪ˠ	nˠ		n̪ˠ	n	n̪ˠ	
nʲ	n	nʲ			n	nʲ	nʲ
Nʲ	n̠ʲ					nʲ	nʲ word-initially ɲ elsewhere
Note: l̠ʲ and n̠ʲ are alveolo-palatal consonants.

As for fortis and lenis ⟨m⟩, in time the lenis version (nasalized semivowel or labial fricative) came to be pronounced as a regular semivowel or fricative along with nasalization of the preceding vowel. The later loss of /w/ between vowels has resulted in phonemically nasalized vowels in some modern dialects (see below), but these are not robustly maintained in any dialect; the strong tendency is to eliminate the nasalization entirely. The original nasalized semivowel is still reflected as ⟨mh⟩ in the spelling, however.

== Vowels ==
Vowel phonemes of Connacht Irish

Vowel phonemes of Munster Irish

Vowel phonemes of Ulster Irish

The vowel sounds vary from dialect to dialect, but in general Connacht and Munster at least agree in having the monophthongs /iː/, /ɪ/, /uː/, /ʊ/, /eː/, /ɛ/, /oː/, /ɔ/, /aː/, /a/, and schwa (/ə/), which is found only in unstressed syllables; and the diphthongs /əi/, /əu/, /iə/, and /uə/.

The vowels of Ulster Irish are more divergent and are not discussed in this article.

=== Vowel backness ===
The backness of vowels (that is, the horizontal position of the highest point of the tongue) depends to a great extent on the quality (broad or slender) of adjacent consonants. Some researchers (e.g. Ó Siadhail & Wigger 1975:80–82, Ó Siadhail 1989:35–37, Ní Chiosáin 1994) have argued that [ɪ] and [ʊ] are actually allophones of the same phoneme, as are [ɛ] and [ɔ], as in a vertical vowel system. Under this view, these phonemes are not marked at an abstract level as either front vowels or back vowels. Rather, they acquire a specification for frontness or backness from the consonants around them. In this article, however, the more traditional assumption that /ɪ, ʊ, ɛ, ɔ/ are four distinct phonemes will be followed. The descriptions of the allophones in this section come from Ó Sé (2000:20–24); the pronunciations therefore reflect the Munster accent of the Dingle Peninsula. Unless otherwise noted, however, they largely hold for other Munster and Connacht accents as well.

==== Close vowels ====
The four close vowel phonemes of Irish are the fully close /iː/ and /uː/, and the near-close /ɪ/ and /ʊ/. Their exact pronunciation depends on the quality of the surrounding consonants. /iː/ is realized as a front [iː] between two slender consonants (e.g. tír [tʲiːrʲ] 'country'). Between a slender and a broad consonant, the tongue is retracted slightly from this position (for which the IPA symbol is [i̠ː]), e.g. díol [dʲi̠ːl̪ˠ] ('sale'), caoire [ki̠ːɾʲə] ('berry' gen.). Between two broad consonants, the tongue is retracted even further, almost to the point of being a central vowel (in IPA, [ïː]): caora [kïːɾˠə] ('sheep'). /uː/ is a fully back [uː] between broad consonants (e.g. dún [d̪ˠuːn̪ˠ] 'fort'), but between a broad and a slender consonant, the tongue is somewhat advanced (IPA [u̟ː]), e.g. triúr [tʲɾʲu̟ːɾˠ] ('three people'), súil [sˠu̟ːlʲ] ('eye'). Between two slender consonants, it is advanced even further, to a centralized vowel (IPA [üː]): ciúin [cüːnʲ] ('quiet').

Approximate ranges of the allophones of close vowels

The near-close vowels /ɪ/ and /ʊ/ show a similar pattern. /ɪ/ is realized between slender consonants as a front [i̞], e.g. tigh [tʲi̞ɟ] ('house' dat.). After a slender consonant and before a broad one, it is a near-front [ɪ], e.g. giota [ˈɟɪt̪ˠə] ('piece'). After a broad consonant and before a slender one, it is a more retracted [ɪ̈], e.g. tuigeann [ˈt̪ˠɪ̈ɟən̪ˠ] ('understands'). Finally, between two broad consonants it is a central [ɨ̞], e.g. goirt [ɡɨ̞ɾˠtʲ]^{2} ('salty'). /ʊ/ is a near-back [ʊ] when all adjacent consonants are broad, e.g. dubh [d̪ˠʊvˠ] ('black'), and a more centralized [ʊ̟] after a slender consonant, e.g. giobal [ˈɟʊ̟bˠəl̪ˠ] ('rag').

==== Mid vowels ====
Approximate ranges of the allophones of mid vowels

The realization of the long close-mid vowels /eː/ and /oː/ varies according to the quality of the surrounding consonants. /eː/ is a front [eː] between two slender consonants (e.g. béic [bʲeːc] 'yell'), a centralized [ëː] between a broad and a slender consonant (e.g. glaoigh [ɡl̪ˠëːɟ] 'call'), and a more open centralized [ɛ̝̈ː] between two broad consonants (e.g. baol [bˠɛ̝̈ːl̪ˠ] 'danger'). /oː/ ranges from a back [oː] between two broad consonants (e.g. fód [fˠoːd̪ˠ] 'turf') to an advanced [o̟ː] between a broad and a slender consonant (e.g. fóid [fˠo̟ːdʲ] 'turf' [gen.]) to a centralized [öː] between two slender consonants (e.g. ceoil [cöːlʲ] 'music' [gen.]).

The short open-mid vowels also vary depending on their environment. Short /ɛ/ ranges from a front [ɛ̝] between slender consonants (e.g. beidh [bʲɛ̝ɟ] 'will be') to a retracted [ɛ̝̈] between a broad and a slender consonant (e.g. bead [bʲɛ̝̈d̪ˠ] 'I will be', raibh [ɾˠɛ̝̈vʲ] 'was') to a central [ɘ̞] when the only adjacent consonant is broad (e.g. croich [kɾˠɘ̞] 'cross' [dat.]). Short /ɔ/ between two broad consonants is usually a back [ɔ̝], e.g. cloch [kl̪ˠɔ̝x] ('stone'), but it is a centralized [ö] adjacent to nasal consonants and labial consonants, e.g. ansan [ən̪ˠˈsˠön̪ˠ] ('there') and bog [bˠöɡ] ('soft'). Between a broad and a slender consonant, it is a more open [ɔ̝̈]: scoil [skɔ̝̈lʲ] ('school'), deoch [dʲɔ̝̈x] ('drink').

===== Schwa =====
Unstressed /ə/ is realized as a near-close, near-front [ɪ] when adjacent to a palatal consonant, e.g. píce [ˈpʲiːcɪ] ('pike'). Next to other slender consonants, it is a mid-centralized [ɪ̽], e.g. sáile [ˈsˠaːlʲɪ̽] ('salt water'). Adjacent to broad consonants, it is usually a mid central [ə], e.g. eolas [ˈoːl̪ˠəsˠ] ('information'), but when the preceding syllable contains one of the close back vowels /uː, ʊ/, it is realized as a mid-centralized back [ʊ̽], e.g. dúnadh [ˈd̪ˠuːn̪ˠʊ̽] ('closing'), muca [ˈmˠʊkʊ̽] ('pigs').

==== Open vowels ====
Approximate ranges of the allophones of open vowels in Munster

The realization of the open vowels varies according to the quality of the surrounding consonants; there is a significant difference between Munster dialects and Connacht dialects as well. In Munster, long /aː/ and short /a/ have approximately the same range of realization: both vowels are relatively back in contact with broad consonants and relatively front in contact with slender consonants. Specifically, long /aː/ in word-initial position and after broad consonants is a back [ɑː], e.g. áit [ɑːtʲ] ('place'), trá [t̪ˠɾˠɑː] ('beach'). Between a slender and a broad consonant, it is a retracted front [a̠ː], e.g. gearrfaidh [ˈɟa̠ːɾˠhəɟ] ('will cut'), while between two slender consonants it is a fully front [aː], e.g. a Sheáin [ə çaːnʲ] ('John' voc.). In Dingle, the back allophone is rounded to [ɒː] after broad labials, e.g. bán [bˠɒːn̪ˠ] ('white'), while in Ring, County Waterford, rounded [ɒː] is the usual realization of /aː/ in all contexts except between slender consonants, where it is a centralized [ɒ̈ː]. Short /a/ between two slender consonants is a front [a], as in gairid [ɟaɾʲədʲ]^{3} ('short'). Between a broad and a slender consonant, it is in most cases a retracted [a̠], e.g. fear [fʲa̠ɾˠ] ('man'), and caite [ˈka̠tʲə] ('worn'), but after broad labials and /l̪ˠ/ it is a centralized front [ä], e.g. baile [bˠälʲə] ('town'), loit [l̪ˠätʲ]^{4} ('injure'). When it is adjacent only to broad consonants, it is a centralized back [ɑ̈], e.g. mac [mˠɑ̈k] ('son'), abair [ɑ̈bˠəɾʲ] ('say').

Approximate ranges of the allophones of open vowels in Connacht

In Connacht varieties, the allophones of short /a/ are consistently further front than the allophones of long /aː/. In Erris, for example, short /a/ ranges from a near-open front vowel [æ] before slender consonants (e.g. sail [sˠælʲ] 'earwax') to an open [a] after slender consonants (e.g. geal [ɟalˠ] 'bright') to a centralized back [ɑ̈] between broad consonants (e.g. capall [ˈkɑ̈pˠəl̪ˠ] 'horse'). Long /aː/, on the other hand, ranges from a back [ɑː] between broad consonants (e.g. bád [bˠɑːd̪ˠ] 'boat') to an advanced back [ɑ̟ː] before slender consonants (e.g. fáil [fˠɑ̟ːlʲ] 'to get') to a centralized back [ɑ̈ː] after slender consonants (e.g. breá [bʲɾʲɑ̈ː] 'fine'). In Toormakeady, the back allophone is rounded to [ɒː] after broad labials, e.g. bán [bˠɒːn̪ˠ] ('white'). In Connemara, the allophones of /a/ are lengthened in duration, so that only vowel quality distinguishes the allophones of /a/ from those of /aː/.

==== Diphthongs ====
Approximate ranges of the allophones of /əi/ and /əu/

The starting point of /əi/ ranges from a near-open central [ɐ] after broad consonants to an open-mid centralized front [ɛ̈] after slender consonants, and its end point ranges from a near-close near-front [ɪ] before slender consonants to a centralized [ɪ̈] before broad consonants. Examples include cladhaire [kl̪ˠɐɪɾʲə] ('rogue'), gadhar [ɡɐɪ̈ɾˠ] ('dog'), cill [cɛ̈ɪlʲ] ('church'), and leigheas [lʲɛ̈ɪ̈sˠ] ('cure').

The starting point of /əu/ ranges from a near-open central [ɐ] after broad consonants to an open-mid advanced central [ɜ̟] after slender consonants, and its end point ranges from a near-close near-back [ʊ] before broad consonants to a centralized [ʊ̈] before slender consonants. Examples include bodhar [bˠɐʊɾˠ] ('deaf'), feabhas [fʲɜ̟ʊsˠ] ('improvement'), labhairt [l̪ˠɐʊ̈ɾʲtʲ] ('speak'), and meabhair [mʲɜ̟ʊ̈ɾʲ] ('memory'). In West Muskerry and the Dingle Peninsula, however, the starting point of /əu/ is rounded and further back after broad consonants, e.g. gabhar [ɡɔʊɾˠ] ('goat').

Approximate ranges of the allophones of /iə/ and /uə/

The starting point of /iə/ ranges from a close front [i] after slender consonants to a retracted [i̠] after word-initial broad /ɾˠ/ (the only context in which it appears after a broad consonant). Its end point ranges from a mid central [ə] before broad consonants to a close-mid centralized front [ë] before slender consonants. Examples include ciall [ciəl̪ˠ] ('sense'), riamh [ɾˠi̠əvˠ] ('ever'), and diabhail [dʲiëlʲ] ('devils').

The starting point of /uə/ is consistently a close back [u] while the end point ranges from [ɐ] to [ɪ̽]: thuas [huɐsˠ] ('above'), uan [uən̪ˠ] ('lamb'), buail [bˠuɪ̽lʲ] ('strike').

=== Nasalized vowels ===
In general, vowels in Irish are nasalized when adjacent to nasal consonants. For some speakers, there are reported to be minimal pairs between nasal vowels and oral vowels, indicating that nasal vowels are also separate phonemes; these generally result from an earlier nasalized semivowel [w̃] (historically the lenited version of /m/), that has since been lost. However, the contrast is not robust in any dialect; most published descriptions say that contrastively nasal vowels are present in the speech of only some (usually older) speakers. Potential minimal pairs include those shown in the table below.

Nasal vowel			Oral vowel		
Spelling	Pronunciation	Gloss	Spelling	Pronunciation	Gloss
amhras	[ˈə̃ũɾˠəsˠ]	'doubt'	abhras	[ˈəuɾˠəsˠ]	'yarn'
áth	[ãː]	'ford'	ádh	[aː]	'luck'
comhair	[kõːɾʲ]	(in phrase os comhair 'in front of, opposite')	cóir	[koːɾʲ]	'righteous'
cumha	[kũː]	'sorrow'	cú	[kuː]	'hound'
deimhis	[dʲĩːʃ]	'pairs of shears'	dís	[dʲiːʃ]	'two people'
fómhair	[fˠõːɾʲ]	'autumn' (genitive)	fóir	[fˠoːɾʲ]	'limit'
lámha	[l̪ˠãː]	'hands'	lá	[l̪ˠaː]	'day'
lámhach	[l̪ˠãːx]	'shooting'	lách	[l̪ˠaːx]	'generous'
nimhe	[nʲĩː]	'poison' (genitive)	ní	[nʲiː]	'washing'
rámha	[ɾˠãː]	'oar' (genitive)	rá	[ɾˠaː]	'saying'

In addition, where a vowel is nasalized because it is adjacent to a nasal consonant, it often retains its nasalization in related forms where the consonant is no longer nasal. For example, the nasal /m/ of máthair [ˈmãːhəɾʲ] ('mother') is replaced by nonnasal /w/ in the phrase a mháthair [ə ˈwãːhəɾʲ] ('his mother'), but the vowel remains nasalized. Similarly, in sneachta [ˈʃnʲãxt̪ˠə] ('snow') the vowel after the /nʲ/ is nasalized, while in an tsneachta [ə ˈtʲɾʲãxt̪ˠə] ('the snow' gen.), the /nʲ/ is replaced by /ɾʲ/ in some northern dialects, but the nasalized vowel remains.

== Phonotactics ==
The most notable aspects of Irish phonotactics revolve around the behaviour of consonant clusters. Here it is important to distinguish between clusters that occur at the beginnings of words and those that occur after vowels, although there is overlap between the two groups.

=== Word-initial consonant clusters ===
A summary of the two-consonant clusters available in non-mutation environments

A summary of the two-consonant clusters available in mutation environments

Irish words can begin with clusters of two or three consonants. In general, all the consonants in a cluster agree in their quality, i.e. either all are broad or all are slender. Two-consonant clusters consist of an obstruent consonant followed by a liquid or nasal consonant (however, labial obstruents may not be followed by a nasal); examples (from Ní Chiosáin 1999) include bleán /bʲlʲaːnˠ/ ('milking'), breá /bʲɾʲaː/ ('fine'), cnaipe /ˈkn̪ˠapʲə/ ('button'), dlí /dʲlʲiː/ ('law'), gnáth /ɡn̪ˠaː/ ('usual'), pleidhce /ˈpʲlʲəicə/ ('idiot'), slios /ʃlʲɪsˠ/ ('slice'), sneachta /ˈʃnʲaxt̪ˠə/ ('snow'), tlúth /t̪ˠl̪ˠuː/ ('poker'), and tnúth /t̪ˠn̪ˠuː/ ('long for'). In addition, /sˠ/ and /ʃ/ may be followed by a voiceless stop, as in sparán /ˈsˠpˠaɾˠaːn̪ˠ/ ('purse') and scéal /ʃceːl̪ˠ/ ('story'). Further, the cluster /mˠn̪ˠ/ occurs in the word mná /mˠn̪ˠaː/ ('women') and a few forms related to it. Three-consonant clusters consist of /sˠ/ or /ʃ/ plus a voiceless stop plus a liquid. Examples include scliúchas /ˈʃclʲuːxəsˠ/ ('rumpus'), scread /ʃcɾʲad̪ˠ/ ('scream'), splanc /sˠpˠl̪ˠaŋk/ ('flash'), spraoi /sˠpˠɾˠiː/ ('fun'), and stríoc /ʃtʲɾʲiːk/ ('streak').

One exception to quality agreement is that broad /sˠ/ is found before slender labials (and for some speakers in Connemara and Dingle before /c/ as well). Examples include: sméara /sˠmʲeːɾˠə/ ('berries'), speal /sˠpʲal/ ('scythe'), spleách /sˠpʲlʲaːx/ ('dependent'), spreag /sˠpʲɾʲaɡ/ ('inspire'), and scéal /ʃceːl̪ˠ/ ~ /sˠceːl̪ˠ/ ('story').

In the environment of an initial consonant mutation, there is a much wider range of possible onset clusters; for example, in a lenition environment the following occur: bhlas /wl̪ˠasˠ/ ('tasted'), bhris /vʲɾʲɪʃ/ ('broke'), chleacht /çlʲaxt̪ˠ/ ('practiced'), chrom /xɾˠɔmˠ/ ('bent'), ghreamaigh /ˈjɾʲamˠə/ ('stuck'), ghníomhaigh /ˈjnʲiːwə/ ('acted'), shleamhnaigh /hlʲəun̪ˠə/ ('slipped'), shnámh /hn̪ˠaːw/ ('swam'), shroich /hɾˠɪç/ ('reached'). In an eclipsis environment, the following are found: mbláth /mˠl̪ˠaː/ ('flower'), mbliana /ˈmʲlʲiən̪ˠə/ ('years'), mbrisfeá /ˈmʲɾʲɪʃaː/ ('you would break'), ndlúth /n̪ˠl̪ˠuː/ ('warp'), ndroichead /ˈn̪ˠɾˠɔhəd̪ˠ/ ('bridge'), ndréimire /ˈnʲɾʲeːmʲəɾʲə/ ('ladder'), ngléasfá /ˈɲlʲeːsˠaː/ ('you would dress'), ngreadfá /ˈɲɾʲat̪ˠaː/ ('you would leave'), ngníomhófá /ˈɲnʲiːwoːhaː/ ('you would act').

In Donegal, Mayo, and Connemara dialects (but not usually on the Aran Islands), the coronal nasals /nˠ, nʲ/ can follow only /sˠ, ʃ/ respectively in a word-initial cluster. After other consonants, they are replaced by /ɾˠ, ɾʲ/: cnoc /kɾˠʊk/ ('hill'), mná /mˠɾˠaː/ ('women'), gnaoi /ɡɾˠiː/ ('liking'), tnúth /t̪ˠɾˠuː/ ('long for').

Under lenition, /sˠn̪ˠ, ʃnʲ/ become /hn̪ˠ, hnʲ/ as expected in these dialects, but after the definite article an they become /t̪ˠɾˠ, tʲɾʲ/: sneachta /ʃnʲaxt̪ˠə/ ('snow'), shneachta /hnʲaxt̪ˠə/ ('snow' [lenited form]), an tsneachta /ə tʲɾʲaxt̪ˠə/ ('the snow' gen.).

=== Post-vocalic consonant clusters and epenthesis ===
Clusters subject to epenthesis

Like word-initial consonant clusters, post-vocalic consonant clusters usually agree in broad or slender quality. The only exception here is that broad /ɾˠ/, not slender /ɾʲ/, appears before the slender coronals /tʲ, dʲ, ʃ, nʲ, lʲ/: beirt /bʲɛɾˠtʲ/ ('two people'), ceird /ceːɾˠdʲ/ ('trade'), doirse /ˈd̪ˠoːɾˠʃə/ ('doors'), doirnín /d̪ˠuːɾˠˈnʲiːnʲ/ ('handle'), comhairle /ˈkuːɾˠlʲə/ ('advice').

A cluster of /ɾˠ, ɾʲ/, /l̪ˠ, lʲ/, or /n̪ˠ, nʲ/ followed by a labial or dorsal consonant (except the voiceless stops /pˠ, pʲ/, /k, c/) is broken up by an epenthetic vowel /ə/: borb /ˈbˠɔɾˠəbˠ/ ('abrupt'), gorm /ˈɡɔɾˠəmˠ/ ('blue'), dearmad /ˈdʲaɾˠəmˠəd̪ˠ/ ('mistake'), dearfa /ˈdʲaɾˠəfˠə/ ('certain'), seirbhís /ˈʃɛɾʲəvʲiːʃ/ ('service'), fearg /ˈfʲaɾˠəɡ/ ('anger'), dorcha /ˈd̪ˠɔɾˠəxə/ ('dark'), dalba /ˈd̪ˠal̪ˠəbˠə/ ('bold'), colm /ˈkɔl̪ˠəmˠ/ ('dove'), soilbhir /ˈsˠɪlʲəvʲəɾʲ/ ('pleasant'), gealbhan /ˈɟal̪ˠəwən̪ˠ/ ('sparrow'), binb /ˈbʲɪnʲəbʲ/ ('venom'), Banbha, /ˈbˠan̪ˠəwə/ (a name for Ireland), ainm /ˈanʲəmʲ/ ('name'), meanma /ˈmʲan̪ˠəmˠə/ ('mind'), ainmhí /ˈanʲəvʲiː/ ('animal').

There is no epenthesis, however, if the vowel preceding the cluster is long or a diphthong: fáirbre /ˈfˠaːɾʲbʲɾʲə/ ('wrinkle'), téarma /ˈtʲeːɾˠmˠə/ ('term'), léargas /ˈlʲeːɾˠɡəsˠ/ ('insight'), dualgas /ˈd̪ˠuəl̪ˠɡəsˠ/ ('duty'). There is also no epenthesis into words that are at least three syllables long: firmimint /ˈfʲɪɾʲmʲəmʲənʲtʲ/ ('firmament'), smiolgadán /ˈsˠmʲɔl̪ˠɡəd̪ˠaːn̪ˠ/ ('throat'), caisearbhán /ˈkaʃəɾˠwaːn̪ˠ/ ('dandelion'), Cairmilíteach /ˈkaɾʲmʲəlʲiːtʲəx/ ('Carmelite').

== Phonological processes ==
=== Vowel-initial words ===
Vowel-initial words in Irish exhibit behaviour that has led linguists to suggest that the vowel sound they begin with on the surface is not actually the first sound in the word at a more abstract level. Specifically, when a clitic ending in a consonant precedes a word beginning with the vowel, the consonant of the clitic surfaces as either broad or slender, depending on the specific word in question. For example, the ⟨n⟩ of the definite article an ('the') is slender before the word iontais ('wonder') but broad before the word aois ('age'):an iontais /ənʲ ˈiːn̪ˠt̪ˠəʃ/ ('the wonder' gen.) vs. an aois /ən̪ˠ ˈiːʃ/ ('the age').

One analysis of these facts is that vowel-initial words actually begin, at an abstract level of representation, with a kind of "empty" consonant that consists of nothing except the information "broad" or "slender". Another analysis is that vowel-initial words, again at an abstract level, all begin with one of two semivowels, one triggering palatalization and the other triggering velarization of a preceding consonant.

=== Lengthening before fortis sonorants ===
Where reflexes of the Old Irish fortis sonorants appear in syllable-final position (in some cases, only in word-final position), they trigger a lengthening or diphthongization of the preceding vowel in most dialects of Irish. The details vary from dialect to dialect.

In Donegal and Mayo, lengthening is found only before ⟨rd, rl, rn⟩, before ⟨rr⟩ (except when a vowel follows), and in a few words also before word-final ⟨ll⟩, e.g. barr /bˠaːɾˠ/ ('top'), ard /aːɾˠd̪ˠ/ ('tall'), orlach /ˈoːɾˠl̪ˠax/ ('inch'), tuirne /ˈt̪uːɾˠn̠ʲə/ ('spinning wheel'), thall /haːl̪ˠ/ ('yonder').

In Connemara, the Aran Islands, and Munster, lengthening is found generally not only in the environments listed above, but also before ⟨nn⟩ (unless a vowel follows) and before word-final ⟨m, ng⟩. For example, the word poll ('hole') is pronounced /pˠəul̪ˠ/ in all of these regions, while greim ('grip') is pronounced /ɟɾʲiːmʲ/ in Connemara and Aran and /ɟɾʲəimʲ/ in Munster.

Because vowels behave differently before broad sonorants than before slender ones in many cases, and because there is generally no lengthening (except by analogy) when the sonorants are followed by a vowel, there is a variety of vowel alternations between different related word-forms. For example, in Dingle ceann ('head') is pronounced /cəun̪ˠ/ with a diphthong, but cinn (the genitive singular of the same word) is pronounced /ciːnʲ/ with a long vowel, while ceanna (the plural, meaning 'heads') is pronounced /ˈcan̪ˠə/ with a short vowel.

This lengthening has received a number of different explanations within the context of theoretical phonology. All accounts agree that some property of the fortis sonorant is being transferred to the preceding vowel, but the details about what property that is vary from researcher to researcher. Ó Siadhail & Wigger (1975:89–90) argue that the fortis sonorant is tense (a term only vaguely defined phonetically) and that this tenseness is transferred to the vowel, where it is realized phonetically as vowel length and/or diphthongization. Ní Chiosáin (1991:188–95) argues that the triggering consonant is underlyingly associated with a unit of syllable weight called a mora; this mora then shifts to the vowel, creating a long vowel or a diphthong. Carnie (2002) expands on that analysis to argue that the fortis sonorants have an advanced tongue root (that is, the bottom of the tongue is pushed upward during articulation of the consonant) and that diphthongization is an articulatory effect of this tongue movement.

=== Devoicing ===
Where a voiced obstruent or /w/ comes into contact with /h/, the /h/ is absorbed into the other sound, which then becomes voiceless (in the case of /w/, devoicing is to /fˠ/). Devoicing is found most prominently in the future of first conjugation verbs (where /h/ is spelled ⟨f⟩) and in the formation of verbal adjectives (where /h/ is spelled ⟨th⟩). For example, the verb scuab /sˠkuəbˠ/ ('sweep') ends in the voiced consonant /bˠ/, but its future tense scuabfaidh /ˈsˠkuəpˠəɟ/ ('will sweep') and verbal adjective scuabtha /ˈsˠkuəpˠə/ ('swept') have the voiceless consonant /pˠ/.

=== Sandhi ===
Irish exhibits a number of external sandhi effects, i.e. phonological changes across word boundaries, particularly in rapid speech. The most common type of sandhi in Irish is assimilation, which means that a sound changes its pronunciation in order to become more similar to an adjacent sound. One type of assimilation in Irish is found when a coronal consonant (⟨d, l, n, r, s, t⟩) changes from being broad to being slender before a word that begins with a slender coronal consonant and vice versa. For example, feall /fʲal̪ˠ/ ('deceive') ends with a broad ⟨ll⟩, but in the phrase d'fheall sé orm [dʲal̠ʲ ʃə ɔɾˠəmˠ] ('it deceived me'), the ⟨ll⟩ has become slender because the following word, sé, starts with a slender coronal consonant.

⟨n(n)⟩ may also assimilate to the place of articulation of a following consonant, becoming labial before a labial consonant, palatal before a palatal consonant, and velar before a velar consonant. For example, ⟨nn⟩ of ceann /can̪ˠ/ ('one') becomes [mˠ] in ceann bacach [camˠ ˈbˠakəx] ('a lame one') and [ŋ] in ceann carrach [caŋ ˈkaɾˠəx] ('a scabbed one'). A voiced consonant at the end of a word may devoice when the next word begins with a voiceless consonant, as in lúb sé [l̪ˠuːpˠ ʃeː] ('he bent'), where /bˠ/ of lúb /l̪ˠuːbˠ/ ('bent') became [pˠ] before the voiceless /ʃ/ of sé.

== Stress ==
In Irish, words normally have only one stressed syllable (ˈ◌). Outside of Munster this is usually the first syllable of the word, e.g. d'imigh /ˈdʲɪmʲiː/ ('left' [verb]) and easonóir /ˈasˠən̪ˠoːɾʲ/ ('dishonor'). However, certain words, especially adverbs and loanwords, have stress on a noninitial syllable, e.g. amháin /əˈwaːnʲ/ ('only'), tobac /təˈbak/ ('tobacco').

=== Compound words ===
In most compound words, there are four possible stress patterns:

1. In most compounds, primary stress falls on the first member and a secondary stress (ˌ◌) falls on the second member, e.g. lagphortach /ˈl̪ˠaɡˌfˠɔɾˠt̪ˠəx/ ('spent bog').
2. In compounds beginning with do-, so- and in- ('possible'), the prefix takes secondary stress, while the following element takes primary stress, e.g. dothuigthe /ˌdˠoˈhɪkʲə/ ('unintelligible').
3. In compounds beginning with an- (intensive prefix), bith- ('perpetual'), colg-, comh-, dian-, glan-, gnáth-, lán- and príomh-, both the prefix and the following syllable take primary stress, e.g. an-mhaith /ˈanˈwa/ ('very good'). Note that an- (meaning 'in-, un-') and bith- (meaning 'bio-') follow the group 1 (primary-secondary) stress pattern.
4. The last group (ard-, dearg-, droch-, fíor-, iar-, ró-, síor-) show a mix of:
  1. variation between primary-primary and primary-secondary stress, e.g. Fíor-Dhia /ˈfʲiːɾˠˈjiːə/ ('true God') vs. fíoruisce /ˈfʲiːɾˠˌɪʃcə/ ('spring water')
  2. variation between primary-secondary and primary-zero stress, particularly in old compounds now treated as simple words, e.g. goltraí /ˈgɔl̪ˠt̪ˠɾˠiː/ ('sorrowful music, lament'), suantraí /ˈsuːən̪ˠt̪ˠɾˠiː/ ('lullaby').
  3. variation in stress pattern depending on whether the second element is a noun or adjective, e.g. primary-primary droch-dhuine /ˈd̪ˠɾˠɔxˈɣinʲə/ ('bad person') vs. primary-secondary drochbhéasach /ˈd̪ˠɾˠɔxˌvʲeːsəx/ ('bad-mannered'), primary-primary Ard-Easpag /ˈaːɾˠd̪ˠˈæsˠpˠəɡ/ ('Archbishop') vs. primary-secondary ardnósach /ˈaːɾˠd̪ˠˌn̪ˠõːsəx/ ('bad-mannered')

=== Munster ===
In Munster, stress is attracted to a long vowel or diphthong in the second or third syllable of a word, e.g. cailín /kaˈlʲiːnʲ/ ('girl'), achainí /axəˈnʲiː/ ('request'). In the now-extinct accent of East Mayo, stress was attracted to a long vowel or diphthong in the same way as in Munster; in addition, stress was attracted to a short vowel before word-final ⟨ll, m, nn⟩ when that word was also final in its utterance. For example, capall ('horse') was pronounced [kaˈpˠɞl̪ˠ] in isolation or as the last word of a sentence, but as [ˈkapˠəl̪ˠ] in the middle of a sentence.

In Munster, stress is attracted to /a/ in the second syllable of a word if it is followed by /x/, provided the first syllable (and third syllable, if there is one) contains a short vowel. Examples include bacach /bˠəˈkax/ ('lame') and slisneacha /ʃlʲəˈʃnʲaxə/ ('chips'). However, if the first or third syllable contains a long vowel or diphthong, stress is attracted to that syllable instead, and the /a/ before /x/ is reduced to /ə/ as normal, e.g. éisteacht /ˈeːʃtʲəxt̪ˠ/ ('listen'), moltachán /ˌmˠɔl̪ˠhəˈxaːn̪ˠ/^{5} ('wether').

== Samples ==
The following table shows some sample sentences from the Aran dialect.

IPA	Spelling	Translation
vʲiː ʃeː əɟ ˈafˠəɾˠk əˈmˠax asˠ ə ˈwɪn̠ʲoːɡ nuəɾʲ ə vʲiː ˈmʲɪʃə ɡɔl haɾˠt̪ˠ	Bhí sé ag amharc^{7} amach as an bhfuinneog nuair a bhí mise ag dul thart.	He was looking out the window when I went past.
n̠ʲiː ˈɛcətʲ ʃeː pˠəul̪ˠ hɾʲiː ˈdʲɾʲeːmʲɾʲə	Ní fheicfeadh sé poll thrí dréimire.	He wouldn't see a hole through a ladder (i.e. he's very near-sighted).
t̪ˠaː mʲeː fʲlɔx hɾʲiːdʲ əsˠ hɾʲiːdʲ	Tá mé fliuch thríd is thríd.	I am wet through and through.
hʊɡ ʃeː klɔx woːɾ ˈaɡəsˠ xa ʃeː lɛʃ ə ˈwɪn̠ʲoːɡ iː	Thug sé cloch mhór agus chaith sé leis an bhfuinneog í.	He took a large stone and he threw it against the window.
ˈhaːnəɟ ʃeː əʃˈtʲax aɡəsˠ kuːx əɾʲ	Tháinig sé isteach agus cuthach air.	He came in in a rage.
―əɾˠ iːk ʃɪbʲ ˈmˠoːɾˠaːn əɾʲ ə mˠuːn ―ɡə ˈdʲɪvʲən dʲiːk sˠə ˈl̪ˠəiəd̪ˠ ə wɪl aːn̪ˠ jɪ	―Ar íoc sibh^{8} mórán ar an móin? ―Go deimhin d'íoc is a laghad a bhfuil ann dhi.	―Did you pay much for the turf? ―We certainly did, considering how little there is of it.
ˈtʲaɡəmʲ aːn̪ˠ xɪlə l̪ˠaː sˠəsˠ ˈmʲɪnəc n̪ˠax mʲiən̪ˠ ˈmˠoːɾˠaːn ˈfˠaːl̠ʲtʲə ɾˠuːmˠ	Tagaim^{9} ann chuile lá is is minic nach mbíonn mórán fáilte romham.	I come there every day but often I'm not very welcome.
t̪ˠaː mʲeː ˈklɪʃtʲaːl ə ɡɔl haɾˠəmˠ ɡə mʲəi ˈsˠavˠɾˠə fʲlɔx sˠə ˈmʲliənə aɡən̠ʲ aɡəsˠ ˈçiːt̪ˠəɾˠ ɣɔmˠ pʲeːn ɡəɾˠ ˈaʃtʲəx ə ʃceːl eː ʃɪn	Tá mé ag cloisteáil ag dul tharam go mbeidh samhradh fliuch sa mbliana againn, agus chítear^{10} dhom féin^{11} gur aisteach an scéal é sin.	I have heard tell that we'll have a wet summer this year, but it seems to me that that story is strange.
wɪl nə ˈfˠat̪ˠiː xoː mˠasˠ d̪ˠuːɾʲtʲ ʃeː	An bhfuil na fataí chomh maith is dúirt sé?	Are the potatoes as good as he said?
ə ˈɣeːlɟə ˈl̪ˠəuɾˠiːɾˠ ə ˈɡuːɟə mˠuːn n̠ʲiː ˈhɔnən̪ˠ iː sˠə ˈɣeːlɟə ˈʃaɡən̠ʲə	An Ghaeilge a labhraítear^{12} i gCúige Mumhan, ní hionann í is an Ghaeilge seo againne.	The Irish spoken in Munster isn't the same as our Irish.

The first eight chapters of Peadar Ua Laoghaire's autobiography Mo Sgéal Féin at Wikisource include recordings of the text being read by a native speaker of Muskerry (Munster) Irish.

== Comparison with other languages ==
=== Scottish Gaelic and Manx ===
Many of the phonological processes found in Irish are found also in its nearest relatives, Scottish Gaelic and Manx. For example, both languages contrast "broad" and "slender" consonants, but only at the coronal and dorsal places of articulation; both Scottish Gaelic and Manx have lost the distinction in labial consonants. The change of /kn̪ˠ ɡn̪ˠ mn̪ˠ/ etc. to /kɾˠ ɡɾˠ mɾˠ/ etc. is found in Manx and most dialects of Scottish Gaelic. Evidence from written manuscripts suggests it had begun in Scottish Gaelic as early as the 16th century and was well established in both Scottish Gaelic and Manx by the late 17th to early 18th century. Lengthening or diphthongization of vowels before fortis sonorants is also found in both languages. The stress pattern of Scottish Gaelic is the same as that in Connacht and Ulster Irish, while in Manx, stress is attracted to long vowels and diphthongs in noninitial syllables, but under more restricted conditions than in Munster.

Manx and many dialects of Scottish Gaelic share with Ulster Irish the property of not reducing unstressed /a/ to /ə/ before /x/.

=== Hiberno-English ===
Irish pronunciation has had a significant influence on the features of Hiberno-English. For example, most of the vowels of Hiberno-English (with the exception of /ɔɪ/) correspond to vowel phones of Irish. The Irish stops [t̪ˠ d̪ˠ] are common realizations of the English phonemes /θ ð/. Hiberno-English also allows /h/ where it is permitted in Irish but excluded in other dialects of English, such as before an unstressed vowel (e.g. Haughey /ˈhɑhi/) and at the end of a word (e.g. McGrath /məˈɡɹæh/). There is epenthesis in words like film [ˈfɪləm] and form [ˈfɒːɹəm].

== See also ==
- An Caighdeán Oifigiúil – "The Official Standard", for writing Irish

== Notes ==
- ^1 Scanradh is pronounced as if spelled *⟨scamhradh⟩; see Irish orthography
- ^2 Goirt is pronounced as if spelled ⟨guirt⟩
- ^3 Gairid is pronounced as if spelled ⟨geairid⟩
- ^4 Loit is pronounced as if spelled ⟨lait⟩
- ^5 Moltachán is pronounced as if spelled *⟨molthachán⟩
- ^6 Thabharfainn is pronounced as if spelled *⟨thiúrfainn⟩
- ^7 Amharc is pronounced as if spelled ⟨afarc⟩
- ^8 Sibh is pronounced as if spelled ⟨sib⟩
- ^9 Tagaim is pronounced as if spelled ⟨teagaim⟩
- ^10 Chítear is pronounced as if spelled ⟨chíotar⟩
- ^11 Féin is pronounced as if spelled ⟨péin⟩
- ^12 Labhraítear is pronounced as if spelled *⟨labhraíthear⟩
