= Joan Keefe =

Irish poet, translator, and scholar

Joan Trodden Keefe (1931 – February 7, 2013) was an Irish poet, translator, and scholar.

== Education and career ==
Keefe attended University College Dublin. In the early 1970s, she began publishing translations of Irish language poetry, along with her own poetry, in both Irish publications such as Soundings and Kilkenny Magazine and overseas ones such as New Orleans Review. Some of these poems, including her translation of Eoghan Rua Ó Súilleabháin's "His Request," were included by John Montague in the Faber Book of Irish Verse. Others appeared in The Other Voice: Twentieth-Century Women's Poetry in Translation, of which she was also a co-editor. She edited and translated Irish Poems from Cromwell to the Famine in 1976.

After moving to the United States, Keefe earned her PhD at the University of California, Berkeley in 1984, with a dissertation consisting of a translation of and commentary on Máirtín Ó Cadhain's Cré na Cille. This translation was the only version of the novel available to non-Irish speakers until 2015. Keefe continued to teach at Berkeley as a lecturer of Celtic Studies and Scandinavian Studies following her graduation, and served as an Irish language consultant in linguistics courses. With Carol Cosman and Kathleen Weaver, she edited the Penguin Book of Women Poets. She also published a number of essays defending and endorsing the "new and vitalising interest" in the writing and publishing of new fiction and poetry in the Irish language. A frequent contributor to World Literature Today, she published 24 articles and reviews in the journal.

== Personal life ==
Trodden Keefe was married to Denis Keefe for 36 years until his death in 1990; Denis was an accomplished physicist at Berkeley and an activist in support of Soviet dissidents. They had three children.
