= Liam Mac Con Iomaire =

Irish journalist (1937–2019)

Liam Mac Con Iomaire (1937, Casla, County Galway – 5 May 2019) was a highly respected Irish writer, journalist and broadcaster.

He was a newsreader on RTÉ. He was author of a number of books and some translations, mainly concerning Connemara, as well as landmark Irish language biographies of Breandán Ó hEithir and Seosamh Ó hÉanaí. He was the father of musician, Colm Mac Con Iomaire.

Liam Mac Con Iomaire and Tim Robinson won the 2016 Lois Roth Award for a Translation of a Literary Work for Graveyard Clay / Cré na Cille: A Narrative in Ten Interludes, by Máirtín Ó Cadhain (Yale University Press, 2016).

== Bibliography ==
- Ireland of the Proverb (with Bill Doyle), Rinehart Publishers, 1995.
- Conamara:The Unknown Country (with Bob Quinn), Chló Iar-Chonnacht, 1997.
- Breandán Ó hEithir: Iomramh Aonair, Chló Iar-Chonnacht, 2000.
- Controller's Report Yearbook 2002, Wiley & Sons Canada, Limited, 2003.
- Seosamh Ó hÉanaí: Nár fhagha mé bás choíche, Chló Iar-Chonnacht, 2007.
- Graveyard Clay (with Tim Robinson), Yale University Press, 2015. (Translated from the original Máirtín Ó Cadhain novel Cré na Cille).

== See also ==
- Mac Con Iomaire, the Gaelic-Irish surname
