= Tom Sailí Ó Flaithearta =

Irish actor (1931–2021)

Tom Sailí Ó Flaithearta (1931 - 15 April 2021) was an Irish actor.

Ó Flaithearta portrayed Cóilín Ó Catháin on the Irish language drama, Ros na Rún. He was a native of Carraroe, and began acting the 1960s, appearing in the 1978 TV production of Poitín playing the character Marcus.

Other appearances include the 1992 short, Conneely's Choice and his role as Seáinín Liam in a 2007 production of Cré na Cille. He had previously portrayed Seáinín Liam in a 1996 production of the play by the Abbey Theatre.

His voice was used in the recordings of seven of the songs on the CD that accompanies the Gugalaí Gug book of children's songs.

His niece, Fionnuala Ní Fhlatharta, is another cast-member of Ros na Rún.

Tom Sailí Ó Flaithearta died on 15 April 2021.

== See also ==
- Ó Flaithbertaigh
