= Connacht Irish =

Irish language dialect

- Connacht Gaelic
- Gaeilge Chonnacht
- Pronunciation: Galway: [ˈɡeːlʲɟə ˌxʊn̪ˠəxt̪ˠ] Mayo: [ˈɡeːlʲɪc ˌxʊn̪ˠəxt̪ˠ]
- Ethnicity: Irish
- Language family: Indo-European: Celtic; Insular Celtic; Goidelic; Irish; Connacht Irish
- Early forms: Primitive Irish: Old Irish; Middle Irish; Early Modern Irish
- Dialects: Conemara; Mayo; Galway East
- Writing system: Latin (Irish alphabet); Irish Braille

Language codes
- ISO 639-3: –
- Glottolog: conn1243
- The three dialects of Irish. Connacht's speakers are spread from Galway and Mayo to Meath.

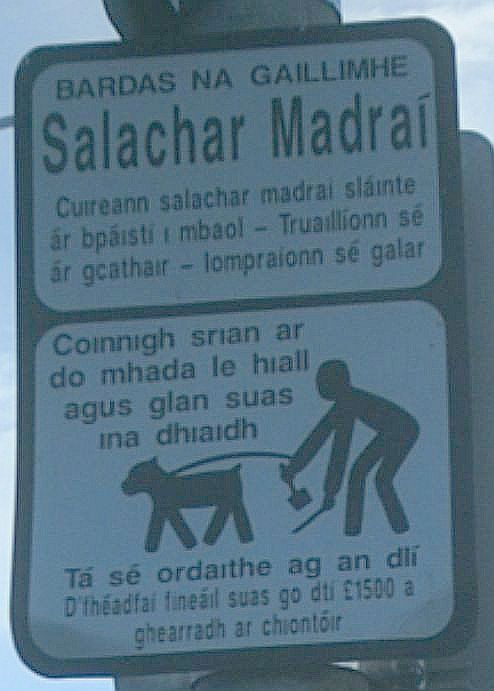
An Irish-language sign in County Galway

Connacht Irish (Irish: Gaeilge Chonnacht) is the dialect of the Irish language spoken in the province of Connacht. Gaeltacht regions in Connacht are found in Counties Mayo (notably Tourmakeady, Achill Island and Erris) and Galway (notably in parts of Connemara and on the Aran Islands). Connacht Irish is also spoken in the Meath Gealtacht Ráth Chairn and Baile Ghib. The dialects of Irish in Connacht are extremely diverse, with the pronunciation, forms and lexicon being different even within each county.

The Irish of South Connemara is often considered the "standard" Connacht Irish owing to the number of speakers however it is unique within Connacht and has a lot more idiomatic connection to extinct dialects in North Clare (for example "acab" instead of "acu" in the rest of Connacht). Words such as dubh and snámh tend to be pronounced with a Munster accent in South Connemara whereas in Joyce Country, Galway City and Mayo they are pronounced with the Ulster pronunciation. In addition to this the standard in Connacht would be to pronounce the words leo and dóibh as "leofa" and "dófa" however in South Connemara and Aran they are pronounced "leothab" and "dóib". Lexical and pronunciation differences exist within Mayo with Tourmakeady featuring an "í" sound in vowel endings much more commonly. In addition to this the lexicon of Dún Chaocháin to the east of Belmullet tends to be far more Ulster influenced than that of Eachléim (murlas vs ronnach) and there is a huge Ulster influence on the dialect of North Mayo in general owing to historic migration. The Irish of Eachréidh na Gaillimhe and Dúiche Sheoigheach tend to share more phonetic commonalities with neighbouring Mayo than with South Connemara.

Documented sub-dialects include those of Cois Fharraige (Note: As documented in books such as Ó Siadhail (1980) and Ihde et al. (2008)) and Conamara Theas, (Note: As documented in Wigger (2004), which recorded speakers from one town in the Conamara Theas district, Rosmuc) both of which are in Galway, and Erris in Mayo.

== Lexicon ==
Some differences between Mayo and Galway are seen in the lexicon:

Mayo	Galway	Gloss
cluinim / cloisim / moithím / airím	cloisim	I hear
doiligh	deacair	difficult
úr	nua	new
nimhneach	tinn	sore

Some words used in Connacht Irish that are not found in other dialects include:

Connacht	Standard	Gloss
cas	buail, bualadh	to meet (Connacht uses verbal noun of casadh)
gasúr	-	young child; Mayo, Munster & Ulster: young boy
cisteanach / cistinidh	Munster: cistin	kitchen

Variant spellings include:

Connacht	Standard	Gloss
tíocht	teacht	verbal noun of tar: to come
aríst	arís	again
caiptín	captaen	captain
col ceathrar	col ceathrair	cousin
feilm, feilméar	feirm, feirmeoir	farm, farmer
ariamh / iriamh	riamh	ever

Variants distinctive of, but not unique to Connacht include:

- fata, fataí, "potato", "potatoes"
- fuisce, "whiskey"
- muid, emphatic form muide/muidí for the first person plural pronoun, Ulster Irish uses this form as well, whereas Munster Irish uses sinn, sinne although sinn, sinne are used in Mayo, particularly in the Erris dialect.
- chuile, "every" (contraction of gach + uile)

== Phonology ==
The phonemic inventory of Connacht Irish (based on the Tourmakeady accent) is as shown in the following chart (see International Phonetic Alphabet for an explanation of the symbols). Symbols appearing in the upper half of each row are velarized (traditionally called "broad" consonants) while those in the bottom half are palatalized ("slender"). The consonant /h/ is neither broad nor slender.

Consonant phonemes	Labial					Coronal						Dorsal				Glottal
Consonant phonemes	Bilabial		Labio- dental		Labio- velar	Dental		Alveolar		Alveolo- palatal		Palatal		Velar		Glottal
Plosive	pˠ pʲ	bˠ bʲ				t̪ˠ	d̪ˠ	tʲ	dʲ			c	ɟ	k	ɡ	
Fricative/ Approximant			fˠ fʲ	vʲ	w			sˠ		ʃ		ç	j	x	ɣ	h
Nasal		mˠ mʲ					n̪ˠ		nˠ nʲ		n̠ʲ		ɲ		ŋ	
Tap									ɾˠ ɾʲ							
Lateral approximant							l̪ˠ		lˠ lʲ		l̠ʲ					

The vowels of Connacht Irish are as shown on the following chart. These positions are only approximate, as vowels are strongly influenced by the palatalization and velarization of surrounding consonants.

In addition, Connacht has the diphthongs /iə, uə, əi, əu/.

Some characteristics of Connacht that distinguish it from the other dialects are:

- In some varieties, vowel lengthening before word-internal clusters of voiced plosive + liquid (e.g. /ɑːɡləʃ/ eaglais "church")
- In some varieties (e.g. in Erris Irish (County Mayo) and, as seen in the table above, in Tourmakeady) a four-way distinction among coronal nasals and laterals: /n̪ˠ ~ nˠ ~ nʲ ~ n̠ʲ/, /l̪ˠ ~ lˠ ~ lʲ ~ l̠ʲ/, often without lengthening of orthographic short vowels before them.
- In the variety spoken in Cois Fharraige (the area along the north shore of Galway Bay between Barna and Casla), underlying short /a/ is realized as a long front [aː] while underlying long /aː/ is realized as a back [ɑː].
- /n/ is realized as [ɾ] (or is replaced by /ɾ/) after consonants other than [s]. This happens in Ulster as well.
- Broad bh is rendered /w/ even in initial positions, with a few exceptions.
- The inflected pronouns agam, agat and againn are usually reduced into monosyllables /amˠ/, /adˠ/, /an̠ʲ/.
- The prepositions do, de are both realised as [gə] (merging with go) and their inflected forms are frequently pronounced (and sometimes written) in their lenited forms.
- The preposition-article compound sa (i + an "in the") causes eclipsis, where it causes lenition in the Caighdeán and in the other dialects.

== Morphology ==
=== Nouns ===
In some dialects of Connacht the plural endings -anna and -acha are always replaced by -annaí and -achaí. It is also common in many Gaelic-speaking areas of Connemara that the dative singular form of all 2nd declension nouns has been generally adopted as the nominative, giving these nouns the typical ending in palatalized consonants in the nominative singular. This is indicated in the spelling by the letter i before the final consonant.

Connemara form	Standard form	Gloss
-achaí, -annaí	-acha, -anna	(plural ending)
bróig	bróg	shoe
ceird	ceard	craft
cluais	cluas	ear
cois	cos	foot, leg
láimh	lámh	hand

=== Verbs ===
Irish conjugation is characterized by having a mixture of synthetic forms (an fhoirm tháite), which provide information about person and number in the verb ending, and analytic forms (an fhoirm scartha), which require the addition of a pronoun. In Galway and Mayo, as in Ulster, the analytic forms are used in a variety of forms where the standard language has synthetic forms, e.g. molann muid "we praise" (standard molaimid) or mholfadh siad "they would praise" (standard mholfaidís). However, the synthetic forms, including those no longer included in the standard language, may be used in answering questions.

Connemara	Standard	Gloss
díonaim	déanaim	I make; I do
íosaim	ithim	I eat

Connacht Irish favours the interrogative pronoun cén and forms based on it such as cén uair, "when" instead of Munster cathain, or céard instead of Munster/Ulster cad. As in Ulster, Scotland and the Isle of Man, relative forms of the verb such as beas "that/who/which will be", or déananns/déanas, "that/who/which do~does" are frequently used.

== Notable speakers ==
Some notable Irish singers who sing songs in the Connacht Irish dialect include Seosamh Ó hÉanaí who was the subject of a 2017 feature film, Song of Granite, by director Pat Collins, MacDara Ó Conaola, Darach Ó Catháin, Seán Mac Donncha and Máire Áine Ní Dhonnchadha.

Inis Meáin storyteller Dara Beag Ó Fátharta was a notable exponent of Inis Meáin Gaeilge and appeared in several television programmes about the island on Irish and international screens.

== Bibliography ==
- de Bhaldraithe, Tomás (1944). The Irish of Cois Fhairrge, Co. Galway: A Phonetic Study. Dublin: Dublin Institute for Advanced Studies. ISBN 978-0-901282-51-4.
- —— (1953). Gaeilge Chois Fhairrge: An Deilbhíocht [Cois Fharraige Irish: Morphology] (in Irish). Dublin: Dublin Institute for Advanced Studies. ISBN 1-85500-029-6.
- —— (1985). Foirisiún Focal as Gaillimh (in Irish). Dublin: Royal Irish Academy.
- de Búrca, Seán (1958). The Irish of Tourmakeady, Co. Mayo. Dublin: Dublin Institute for Advanced Studies. ISBN 0-901282-49-9.
- Finck, Franz Nikolaus (1899). Die araner mundart: ein betrag zur erforschung des westirischen (in German). Marburg: N. G. Elwert'sche Verlagsbuchhandlung.
- Hartmann, Hans; de Bhaldraithe, Tomás; Ó hUiginn, Ruairí, eds. (1996). Airneán: Ein Sammlung von Texted aus Carna, Co. na Gaillimhe (in German). Tübingen: Niemeyer. ISBN 978-3-48442-913-0.
- Ihde, Thomas; Ní Neachtain, Máire; Blyn-LaDrew, Roslyn; Gillen, John (2008). Colloquial Irish: The Complete Course for Beginners. New York and London: Routledge. ISBN 978-0415381307.
- Mhac an Fhailigh, Éamonn (1968). The Irish of Erris, Co. Mayo. Dublin Institute for Advanced Studies. ISBN 0-901282-02-2.
- Ó Cadhain, Máirtín (2021) [written and compiled 1937-1946]. "Foclóir Mháirtín Uí Chadhain" (in Irish).
- Ó Curnáin, Brian (2007). The Irish of Iorras Aithneach County Galway. Dublin: Dublin Institute for Advanced Studies. ISBN 978-1-85500-204-3.
- Ó Direáin, Séamas (November 2015) [2014]. A Survey of Spoken Irish in the Aran Islands, Co. Galway (PDF) (Report) (2nd ed.). Moore Institute.
- Ó Máille, Tomás Seosamh (1974). Liosta Focal as Ros Muc (in Irish). Dublin: Irish University Press.
- Ó Murchú, Séamas (1982). de Bhaldraithe, Tomás (ed.). Liosta Focal as Idir Shúgradh agus Dáiríre. Deascán Foclóireachta (in Irish). Vol. 2. Dublin: Royal Irish Academy. ISBN 978-0-90-171420-6.
- —— (2009). Ó Baoill, Dónall P. (ed.). An Teanga Bheo: Gaeilge Chonamara (in Irish). Dublin: An Gúm.
- Ó Siadhail, Mícheál (1978). Téarmaí Tógála agus Tís as Inis Meáin (in Irish). Dublin: Dublin Institute for Advanced Studies.
- —— (1980). Learning Irish. Yale University Press. ISBN 978-0-30-006462-9.
- Stockman, Gerard (1974). The Irish of Achill, Co. Mayo: a miscellaneous collection of linguistic material from the parish of Achill with a phonetic description of the dialect. Belfast: Institute of Irish Studies, Quenn's University Belfast.
- Wagner, Heinrich (1966). Linguistic Atlas and Survey of Irish Dialects. Vol. III: The Dialects of Connaught. Dublin: Dublin Institute for Advanced Studies. ISBN 0-901282-47-2.
- Wigger, Arndt (1970). Nominalformen im Conamara-Irischen (in German). Hamburg: Lüdke.
- ——, ed. (2004). Caint Ros Muc (in Irish). photographs by Seán de Brún. Dublin: Dublin Institute for Advanced Studies.

== Literature ==
- a Búrc, Éamon (1982). Eochair Mac Rí in Éirinn: Eochair, a King's Son in Ireland (in Irish). Dublin: Comhairle Bhéaloideas Éireann, University College Dublin.
- Bairéad, Tomás (1938). An Geall a Briseadh (in Irish). Dublin: Oifig Díolta Foillseacháin Rialtais.
- —— (1949). Ór na h-aitinne (in Irish). Dublin: faoi Chomhartha na dTrí gCoinneal.
- Becker, Heinrich, ed. (1997). I mBéal na Farraige: Scéalta agus seanchas faoi chúrsaí feamainne ó bhéal na ndaoine (in Irish). Indreabhán: Cló Iar-Chonnacht. ISBN 1900693844. [folklore about the sea and seaweed, Cois Fhairrge]
- Breathnach, Pádraic (1978). Buicéad Poitín agus scéalta eile (in Irish). Baile Átha Cliath: Clódhanna Teoranta. [short stories, Maigh Cuilinn]
- —— (1984). Bean Aonair agus scéalta eile (in Irish). Baile Átha Cliath: Clódhanna Teoranta. [short stories, Maigh Cuilinn]
- —— (1986). Maigh Cuilinn: A Táisc is a Tuairisc (in Irish). Indreabhán: Cló Chonamara. ISBN 978-0-86-329012-1. [folklore, Maigh Cuilinn]
- —— (1987). Ar na Tamhnacha (in Irish). Baile Átha Cliath: Clódhanna Teoranta. [short stories, Maigh Cuilinn]
- —— (1990). Gróga Cloch (in Irish). Indreabhán: Cló Iar-Chonnacht. ISBN 1900693402. [novel, Maigh Cuilinn]
- —— (1996). An Pincín agus scéalta eile (in Irish). Indreabhán: Cló Iar-Chonnacht. ISBN 187470029X. [short stories, Maigh Cuilinn]
- —— (1998). As na Cúlacha (in Irish). Indreabhán: Cló Iar-Chonnacht. ISBN 1902420918. [novel, Maigh Cuilinn]
- de Bhaldraithe, Tomás, ed. (1977). Seanchas Thomáis Laighléis (in Irish). Baile Átha Cliath: An Clóchomhar Teoranta. ISBN 978-1-906883-17-1. [storytelling of Tomás Laighléis, Mionlach]
- Mac Amhlaigh, Dónall (1960). Dialann Deoraí [Diary of an Exile] (in Irish). Baile Átha Cliath: An Clóchomhar Teoranta. [autobiography]
- —— (1981). Beoir Bhaile agus scéalta eile (in Irish). Baile Átha Cliath: An Clóchomhar Teoranta. [short stories and journalism]
- Mac an Iomaire, Séamas (1985). Cladaí Chonamara (in Irish). Baile Átha Cliath: An Gúm. ISBN 978-1-85-791447-4. [folklore, Connemara]
- Mac Con Iomaire, Liam (2000). Breandán Ó hEithir: Iomramh Aonair (in Irish). Indreabhán: Cló Iar-Chonnachta. ISBN 1902420292. [biography, Aran Islands]
- Mac Domhnaill, Tomás; Mac Énrí, Seán; Ó Tuairisg, Lochlann, eds. (2009). Mícheál Breathnach: Scríbhinní (in Irish). Indreabhán: Cló Iar-Chonnacht. ISBN 978-1-90-556038-7. [collection of writings by Mícheál Breathnach, Cois Fhairrge]
- Mac Giollarnáth, Seán (1941). Annála Beaga ó Iorrus Aithneach (in Irish). Dublin: Oifig an tSoláthair.
- —— (1949). Mo Dhúthaigh Fhiáin (in Irish). Dublin: Brún agus Ó Nualláin.
- Mac Lochlainn, Alf (1999). Fiáin na Bocs a Bhí ann an tAm Sin (in Irish). Dublin: Coiscéim. [local history, Connemara]
- Mac Ruairí, Mícheál (1993) [1908]. Ridire an Gháire Dhuibh agus scéalta eile (in Irish). Dublin: Coiscéim. [stories, Northern Mayo]
- Mag Ruaidhrí, Mícheál (2001). Le Linn m'Óige (in Irish). Dublin: Coiscéim. [memoirs, Northern Mayo]
- Mac Thuathaláin, Peadar (1934). Peadar Chois Fhairrge: scéalta nua agus seanscéalta d'innis Peadar Mac Thuathaláin nach maireann (in Irish). collected by Seán Mac Giollarnáth. Dublin: Oifig Díolta Foillseacháin Rialtais.
- Mag Uidhir, Séamas (1994). Fánaíocht i gContae Mhaigh Eo (in Irish). Dublin: An Gúm. [Northern Mayo]
- Mná Fiontracha (2004). Ár nOileán: Tuile 's Trá [Our Island: Ebb & Flood]. Bailiúchán Bhéaloideas Árann (in Irish). Árann: Mná Fiontracha. ISBN 0954606116. OCLC 56759040. [folklore, Aran Islands]
- Ní Mhainnín, Cáit (2000). Cuimhní Cinn Cháit Ní Mhainnín (in Irish). Indreabhán: Cló Iar-Chonnachta. ISBN 1902420233. [autobiography, Connemara]
- Ó Baoill, Pádraig, ed. (2005). Glórtha ár Sinsear: Béaloideas Oirdheisceart na Gaillimhe (in Irish). Baile Átha Cliath: Coiscéim. [folklore, eastern Galway]
- Ó Cadhain, Máirtín (1949). Cré na Cille (in Irish). Baile Átha Cliath: Sáirséal agus Dill. [novel, Connemara]
- —— (1970). An tSraith dhá Tógáil (in Irish). Baile Átha Cliath: Sáirséal agus Dill. [short stories, Connemara]
- —— (1975). Idir Shúgradh agus Dáiríre (in Irish). Baile Átha Cliath: Oifig an tSoláthair. [short stories, Connemara]
- —— (1977). An tSraith Tógtha (in Irish). Baile Átha Cliath: Sáirséal agus Dill. [short stories, Connemara]
- —— (1986). An tSraith ar Lár (in Irish). Baile Átha Cliath: Sáirséal — Ó Marcaigh. [short stories, Connemara]
- —— (1990). Ó Laighin, Seán (ed.). Ó Cadhain i bhFeasta (in Irish). Baile Átha Cliath: Clódhanna Teoranta. [essays, journalism, history, politics, miscellany, Connemara]
- —— (1991) [1948]. An Braon Broghach (in Irish). Baile Átha Cliath: An Gúm. [short stories, Connemara]
- —— (1995). Athnuachan (in Irish). Baile Átha Cliath: Coiscéim. [novel, Connemara]
- —— (1998). Ó Cathasaigh, Aindrias (ed.). Caiscín: Altanna san Irish Times 1953/56 [Wholemeal: Articles in the Irish Times 1953–56] (in Irish). Baile Átha Cliath: Coiscéim. [journalism, Connemara]
- —— (1999). Prút, Liam (ed.). Caithfear Éisteacht! Aistí Mháirtín Uí Chadhain in Comhar (in Irish). Baile Átha Cliath: Comhar Teoranta. [essays, Connemara]
- —— (1999). Tone Inné agus Inniu (in Irish). Baile Átha Cliath: Coiscéim. [history, politics, Connemara]
- —— (2002). Ó hÁinle, Cathal (ed.). Barbed Wire (in Irish). Baile Átha Cliath: Coiscéim. [novel, Connemara]
- —— (2002). Ó Laighin, Seán (ed.). An Ghaeilge Bheo: Destined to Pass (in Irish and English). Baile Átha Cliath: Coiscéim. [research and opinions, Connemara]
- —— (2004). Cois Caoláire (in Irish). Baile Átha Cliath: Sáirséal — Ó Marcaigh. [short stories, Connemara]
- —— (1995). Seanfhocail as Acaill (in Irish). Indreabhán: Cló Iar-Chonnachta. [folklore, Achill Island]
- Ó Catháin, Séamas; Uí Sheighin, Caitlín, eds. (1987). A Mhuintir Dhú Chaocháin, Labhraigí Feasta! (in Irish). Indreabhán: Cló Chonamara. [folklore, Northern Mayo]
- ——; Uí Sheighin, Caitlín, eds. (1996). Le Gradam is le Spraoi (in Irish). Indreabhán: Cló Iar-Chonnachta. [folklore, Northern Mayo]
- Ó Ceallaigh, Colm (1995). Brídín (in Irish). Indreabhán: Cló Iar-Chonnachta. [novel, Connemara]
- —— (2002). Meilt Mhuilte Dé (in Irish). Baile Átha Cliath: Coiscéim. [novel, Connemara]
- —— (2004). Clann na Feannóige (in Irish). Baile Átha Cliath: Coiscéim. [short stories, Connemara]
- Ó Ceannabháin, Peadar, ed. (1983). Éamon a Búrc - Scéalta. Leabhar Thaighde (in Irish). Vol. 42. Baile Átha Cliath: An Clóchomhar. [folklore, Connemara]
- Ó Coincheanainn, Peadar (1993). Ó Siadhail, Pádraig (ed.). Inis Meáin: seanchas agus scéalta (in Irish). Bill Doyle (illustrations). Baile Átha Cliath: An Gúm. [local history, Aran Islands]
- Ó Conaire, Pádraic (1956). Scothscéalta (in Irish). Dublin: Sáirséal agus Dill.
- Ó Conaire, Pádraig Óg (1936). Éan Cuideáin (in Irish). Dublin: Oifig an tSoláthair.
- Ó Conaola, Dara (1983). Cor in Aghaidh an Chaim (in Irish). Inis Oírr: Ceardshiopa Inis Oírr Teoranta. [story, Aran Islands]
- —— (1988). Amuigh Liom Féin (in Irish). Inis Oírr: Ceardshiopa Inis Oírr Teoranta. [story, Aran Islands]
- Ó Conaola, Máirtín (1994). Munch-Pedersen, Ole (ed.). Scéalta Mháirtín Neile: bailiúchán scéalta ó Árainn (in Irish). Holger Pedersen (collected by). Baile Átha Cliath: Comhairle Bhéaloideasa Éireann. [folklore, Aran Islands]
- Ó Conghaile, Mícheál (1986). Mac an tSagairt (in Irish). Béal an Daingin: Cló Iar-Chonnachta. [short stories, Connemara]
- —— (1997). An Fear a Phléasc (in Irish). Indreabhán: Cló Iar-Chonnachta. ISBN 1874700796.
- —— (1999). Sna Fir (in Irish). Indreabhán: Cló Iar-Chonnachta. ISBN 1902420209.
- —— (2002). Seachrán Jeaic Sheáin Johnny (in Irish). Indreabhán: Cló Iar-Chonnachta. [novel, Connemara]
- Ó Conghaile, Seán (1974). Cois Fharraige le mo Linnse (in Irish). Baile Átha Cliath: Clódhanna Teoranta. [folklore, autobiography, Connemara]
- Ó Corbáin, Seán (2005). Daoine Dathúla an Iarthair (in Irish). Baile Átha Cliath: Cló Chaisil. [West Galway]
- Ó Curraoin, Seán, ed. (2000). Iascairín Chloch na Cora: Scéalta agus Seanchas ó Bhearna agus na Forbacha (in Irish). Baile Átha Cliath: Coiscéim. [folklore, Bearna/Na Forbacha]
- Ó Direáin, Máirtín (1969). Feamainn Bhealtaine (in Irish). Baile Átha Cliath: An Clóchomhar Teoranta. [autobiography, Aran Islands]
- —— (2004). Dánta 1939-1979 (in Irish). Baile Átha Cliath: An Clóchomhar Teoranta. [poetry, Aran Islands]
- Ó Direáin, Peadar (1926). Ó Mocháin, Seán (ed.). Sgéalaidhe Leitir Mealláin (in Irish). foreword by Tomás Ó Máille. Dublin: Comhlucth Oideachais na nÉireann.
- —— (1926). Ó Mocháin, Seán (ed.). Sgéalaidhe Leitir Mealláin (in Irish). foreword by Tomás Ó Máille. Dublin: Comhlucth Oideachais na nÉireann.
- —— (1929). Sgéalta na n-Oileán : sgéalta agus dréachta (in Irish). Dublin: Ar na fhoillsiú do mhuinntír C. S. Ó Fallamhain, teo., i gcomhar le hOifig an tSoláthair.
- —— (1929). Sgéalta na n-Oileán : sgéalta agus dréachta (in Irish). Dublin: Ar na fhoillsiú do mhuinntír C. S. Ó Fallamhain, teo., i gcomhar le hOifig an tSoláthair.
- Ó Duinnshléibhe, Tomás (1995). Taidhgín (in Irish). Indreabhán: Cló Iar-Chonnachta. [novel, Tourmakeady]
- Ó Finneadha, Cóil Learaí (1995). Tórramh an Bhardail agus Scéalta Eile (in Irish). Baile Átha Cliath: An Gúm. [short stories, Connemara]
- Ó Flaithearta, Liam (1970). Dúil (in Irish). Baile Átha Cliath: Sáirséal agus Dill. [short stories, Aran Islands]
- Ó Gaora, Colm (2008). Mise (in Irish). Baile Átha Cliath: An Gúm. [autobiography, Ros Muc]
- Ó Giollagáin, Conchúir, ed. (1999). Stairsheanchas Mhicil Chonraí: Ón Máimín go Ráth Cairn (in Irish). Indreabhán: Cló Iar-Chonnachta. [folklore, memoirs, autobiography, Connemara]
- Ó Gráinne, Diarmuid, ed. (1995). Máire Phatch Mhóir Uí Churraoin: A Scéal Féin (in Irish). Baile Átha Cliath: Coiscéim. [autobiography, Connemara]
- Ó hEithir, Breandán (1983) [1976]. Lig Sinn i gCathú (in Irish). Baile Átha Cliath: Sáirséal Ó Marcaigh. [novel, Aran Islands]
- —— (1988). Sionnach ar mo Dhuán (in Irish). Baile Átha Cliath: Sáirséal Ó Marcaigh. [novel, Aran Islands]
- —— (1991). Nic Pháidín, Caoilfhionn (ed.). An Chaint sa tSráidbhaile (in Irish). Baile Átha Cliath: Comhar Teoranta. [journalism, Aran Islands]
- Ó Laighin, Pádraig G. (1997). Bánú Phartraí agus Thuar Mhic Éadaigh (in Irish). Baile Átha Cliath: Coiscéim. [local history, Southern Mayo]
- Ó Máille, Tomás (2002) [1936]. An Béal Beo (in Irish). Baile Átha Cliath: An Gúm. [lexicon, expressions, Connemara]
- —— (2007) [1937]. Ó Cadhain, Máirtín (ed.). An tIomaire Rua: Cogadh na Saoirse i dTuaisceart Chonamara (in Irish). Baile Átha Cliath: An Gúm. [history, Connemara]
- Ó Máille, Tomás Seosamh (2010) [1948-1952]. Uí Bhraonáin, Donla (ed.). Seanfhocla Chonnacht (in Irish). Cois Life. ISBN 978-1-901176-41-4.
- Ó Neachtain, Joe Steve (1998). Clochmhóin (in Irish). Indreabhán: Cló Iar-Chonnachta. [short stories, Connemara]
- —— (2003). Scread Mhaidine (in Irish). Indreabhán: Cló Iar-Chonnachta. [novel, Connemara]
- —— (2005). Lámh Láidir (in Irish). Indreabhán: Cló Iar-Chonnachta. [novel, Connemara]
- —— (2014). Idir Neamh is Talamh (in Irish). Indreabhán: Cló Iar-Chonnachta.
- Ó Ráighne, Mícheál (1994). Bóithrín na hAille Báine (in Irish). Indreabhán: Cló Iar-Chonnachta. [novel, Connemara]
- —— (1993). Deoir ón tSúil (in Irish). Indreabhán: Cló Iar-Chonnachta. [novel, Connemara]
- —— (2002). Nach Iomaí Cor sa Saol (in Irish). Indreabhán: Cló Iar-Chonnachta. [novel, Connemara]
- Ó Ruadháin, Seán (1994). Pádhraic Mháire Bhán (in Irish). Baile Átha Cliath: An Gúm. [Northern Mayo]
- Scríbhneoirí Ban Ros Muc (1995). Idir Mná (in Irish). Ros Muc: Pléaráca Chonamara. [memoirs and folklore, Ros Muc]
- William, Tony Catherine Antoine (1999). A Chomhairle Féin do Mhac Anna (in Irish). Indreabhán: Cló Iar-Chonnacht. [folklore, Achill Island]

== Music ==
- Ní Fhátharta, Celia (2010). Irish Traditional Sean-Nós Songs (CD). Inverin: Cló Iar-Chonnacht.
- Ó Fátharta, Meaití Jó Shéamuis (2003). Bóithríní an Locháin: Sean-Nós Songs from Connemara (CD). Inverin: Cló Iar-Chonnacht.
