= Congal =

Congal is an Old Irish masculine given name. It may refer to:

== People ==
- Congal Cáech (died 637), king of the Cruithne of Dál nAraidi in Ireland
- Congal Cennfota mac Dúnchada (died 674), king of Ulaid in Ireland
- Congal Cennmagair (died 710), High King of Ireland
- Congal Cláiringnech, legendary High King of Ireland, reigned 80–51 BCE, 135–120 BCE or 184–169 BCE according to different sources
- Congal mac Áedo Sláine (died 634), king of Brega in Ireland
- Congal mac Máele Dúin (died 690), king of Iarmuman in Ireland
- Flaithniadh mac Congal (died 776), abbot of Clonfert

== Places ==
- Congal Biomarine Station, a protected nature reserve in Esmeraldas Province, Ecuador

== See also ==
- Conghail, a surname
