= Arndt Wigger =

German linguist

- Born: 1943 (age 82–83); Dresden, Germany

Academic background
- Education: Hamburg University
- Thesis: Nominalformen im Conamara-Irischen (1970)
- Doctoral advisor: Hans Hartmann

Academic work
- Discipline: Linguist
- Sub-discipline: Modern Irish Gaelic linguistics
- Institutions: University of Wuppertal; University of Bonn

Arndt Wigger (born 1943 in Dresden, Germany) is a German linguist. A specialist in Modern Irish (Nua-Ghaeilge), Wigger has published many articles on different aspects of the modern form of the language. He is a fluent speaker of the Connemara dialect. He also studies Hungarian, Portuguese and Arabic. He is closely associated with the Studienhaus für Keltische Sprachen und Kulturen - SKSK, at the University of Bonn.

== Career ==
Wigger studied the Irish language under Hans Hartmann in the 1960s at the University of Hamburg. He taught general linguistics at the University of Wuppertal until 2009. After completing a thesis entitled Nominalformen im Conamara-Irischen in 1970, he published many other studies, especially on Modern Irish. Following his thesis, he worked at the Dublin Institute for Advanced Studies in the school of Celtic Studies. In addition, he has published many Irish texts based on sound recordings. He revised the German edition of the Irish-language textbook Lehrbuch der irischen Sprache, with Mícheál Ó Siadhail (1980).

He joined two research initiatives, one on dialects in Irish (1995–2000) and one on the Irish language (2005–2008), funded by Deutsche Forschungsgemeinschaft (the German Research Foundation). It was at Wigger's initiative that the SKSK, (Studienhaus für Keltische Sprachen und Kulturen) was established.

In 2012, he made a film for TG4 about his former teacher Hans Hartman, a man who recorded many native Irish speakers in Connemara in the late 1930s and broadcast Nazi propaganda in Gaelic from Germany during World War II. Wigger says in the film that he had high regard for Hartman as a teacher, but he would have abandoned him on the spot had he known that Hartman was a former member of the Nazi Party.

Wigger has been instrumental in bringing to the attention of Irish academics and researchers the importance of general-register speech (as opposed to high-register speech, as found in traditional storytelling and other such genres).

== Monographs ==
- Nominalformen im Conamara-Irischen. 1970
- Córas Fuaimeanna na Gaeilge (with Mícheál Ó Siadhail). 1975

== Books ==
- Deutsch für arabische Germanisten. Ein grammatisches Übungsbuch. 1990

- Mícheál O Siadhail: Lehrbuch der irischen Sprache. 1985, 3. Aufl. Hamburg 2004. (Übersetzung/Bearbeitung)

- Caint Ros Muc (Téacs agus Foclóir). Baile Átha Cliath 2004

- Éigse Chonamara (Texte und Übersetzungen). Aachen 2007

- Bádóireacht. (Texte und Übersetzungen. with Feargal Ó Béarra). Aachen 2012

== Articles ==
- “Preliminaries to a generative morphology of the Modern Irish Noun.” (Ériu, 23, 1972)

- “Grammatik und Sprachverwendung in der Satzordnung des Neuirischen.” (Fs. W. Giese. 1972)

- “Towards a generative phonology of the Modern Irish Noun.” (Linguistics, 109, 1973)

- “Sprachenpolitik und Sprachplanung im nachkolonialen Irland.” (OBST, 4, 1977)

- “Irish dialect phonology and problems of Irish orthography.” (Occasional Papers in Linguistics and Language Learning, 6, 1979) – Irisch. (SL, 8/9, 1980)

- “The pregnant director and his male daughters. On sex coming to life in German word-formation.” (OBST, Beiheft 3, 1979)

- “Kategoriale und begriffliche Probleme der Forschung über Sprach(en)politik.” (Mit H. Glück). (OBST, 12, 1979)

- “Kritische Bemerkungen zum phonematischen Prinzip in Theorie und Praxis der Verschriftung.” (Sprache & Herrschaft, 15, 1984)

- “Überlegungen zur kontrastiven Grammatik Deutsch - Arabisch.” (Al Azhar University Faculty of Languages and Translation Studies 1986)

- “Die Darstellung des Wortakzentes im Arabischen.” (Studien zur Theorie des Lexikons. 1993)

- “Comparing Arabic.” (Beiträge zur kontrastiven Linguistik. Hg.: M. Markus. 1993)

- “Stand und Aufgaben der irischen Dialektologie.” (1. Keltologisches Symposium, April 1992. Hg.: M. Rockel, S. Zimmer. 1993)

- “Aspekte der Redewiedergabe im gesprochenen Irischen.” (Zeitschrift für celtische Philologie, 49/50, 1997)

- “Empirische Beobachtungen zu Sprachkontaktphänomenen im gesprochenen Irischen.” Akten des 2. Symposiums deutschsprachiger Keltologen. Bonn 1997. Hg.: S. Zimmer. 1998)

- Zu den sogenannten Echoformen des neuirischen Verbs. In: Bublitz, Wolfram et al. (eds.): Philologie, Typologie und Sprachstruktur. Festschrift für Winfried Boeder. Frankfurt/Main etc. 2002. S. 411–431

- "Es schlug ein Stolpern aus ihm, dass er verloren ging." Kontrastive Studie zu irisch-deutschen Verbäquivalenzen. In: Wigger, A. (ed.): Transceltica. Übersetzung keltischer Literatur in mitteleuropäische Sprachen. Aachen 2004. S. 69-82

- Advances in the lexicography of Modern Irish verbs. In: Bloch-Rozmej, A. (ed.): Issues in Celtic Linguistics. = Lublin Studies in Celtic Languages 5 (2008). pp. 233–250

- An modh coinníollach neamhchoinníollach. Dátaí agus smaointe i dtaobh mhodhanna briathartha na Gaeilge. In: MacCraith, M. & P. Ó Héalaí (eag.): Diasa Díograise. Aistí i gcuimhne ar Mháirtín Ó Briain. Indreabhán 2009. lch. 475 - 489

- Review of: Ó Curnáin, Brian: The Irish of Iorras Aithneach. In: Zeitschrift für celtische Philologie 57 (2009/10). S. 246-257

- The role of German-speaking scholars in the study of Modern Irish. In: Journal of the Royal Society of Antiquaries of Ireland, vol. 139, 2009 [2011]. pp. 101–110

- Variatio delectat ? Analyse und Diskussion intradialektaler Variation im Irischen. In: Bachmann, R., K. Himstedt & C. Mogharbel (eds.): Form und Struktur in der Sprache. Festschrift für Elmar Ternes. Hamburg 2010

- Cuir, caith, leag and other placement verbs. In: Zimmer, Stefan (ed.): Kelten am Rhein. Akten des 13. Internationalen Keltologiekongresses. 2. Teil: Philologie. Sprachen und Literaturen. Mainz 2010. S. 309 - 317

- Denken und glauben im Neuirischen: Syntax und Semantik ausgewählter kognitiver Verben. In: Stüber, Karin et al. (Hrsg.): Akten des 5. Deutschsprachigen Keltologensymposiums Zürich 2009. Wien 2010. pp. 427 – 446

- On defective verbal nouns in Modern Irish. In: Hickey, Raymond (ed.): Researching the Languages of Ireland. Acta Universitatis Upsaliensis. Studia Celtica Upsaliensia 8, 2011. pp. 137–158
