= Coláiste na bhFiann =

Summer school run in Rosmuc and Rath Cairn, Ireland

Coláiste na bhFiann (CnabhF) is an Irish language summer course for students aged 10–18 years. The company was founded by Domhnall Ó Lubhlaí and the first course was in Rosmuc, County Galway, Ireland in 1968. Since then, fifty thousand students have studied on their summer courses.

== Activities ==
Some courses are college-based and others are based in the Gaeltacht areas of Rosmuc, County Galway and Ráth Cairn, County Meath. Most courses are three-week residential courses in which students are immersed in an Irish-speaking environment. During these courses, students attend classes and take part in various activities, games, arts, crafts, and sport. As Ireland's longest-established course organiser, several other courses have been founded on the same model.

In 1970, Cumann na bhFiann was founded to provide weekly youth clubs and to give students the opportunity to practise the language skills acquired on the summer courses. As of 2016, there were approximately sixty clubs in the country.

== Sexual abuse allegations ==
Since his death, Domhnall Ó Lubhlaí, the company's founder and first teacher on the courses, has been subject to allegations that he sexually attacked and abused teenage boys in the 1960s and 1970s either at school or during Coláiste na bhFiann outings.

== Locations ==
=== Residential - Rule A ===
- Ros Muc, County Galway. The first teacher here was Domhnall Ó Lubhlaí

=== Residential - Rule B ===
- Gaoth Dobhair, County Donegal
- Baile an Uairnigh (Warrenstown), County Meath (opened 2010)
- Ráth Chairn, County Meath

== Past pupils ==
- Hector Ó hEochagáin, television presenter
- Cynthia Ní Mhurchú, television presenter
- Carrie Crowley, television presenter
- Catherine Martin, Irish government minister
