= Macdara Ó Fátharta =

Irish actor

Macdara Ó Fátharta is an Irish actor, most famous for his role as the villainous publican Tadhg Ó Direáin on the long-running Irish language TG4 drama, Ros na Rún.

== Biography ==
A native of Inis Meáin, Ó Fátharta was born and raised in the historic cottage used by John Millington Synge and Padraig Pearse early in the twentieth century when they were studying Irish on the island. On leaving school, Ó Fátharta spent two years with an acting school with the Abbey Theatre and subsequently twenty years with the Abbey from 1972 to 1996, while there he acted in plays by John B. Keane, Brian Friel, Tom Murphy, Shakespeare, Chekov, all of his production involvement can be found in the Abbey archives. In 1975 he appeared in a play by Irish playwright Teresa Deevy called Katie Roche where he played the part of Jo Mahony.

In 1995 Ó Fátharta adapted the seminal novel Cré na Cille for the stage and later wrote the screenplay for the film version. He has over ten television productions to his credit, and parts in films such as Far and Away, The Blackwater Lightship, and the first-ever Irish language feature film Poitín.

He is married to Eileen Dunne who is a news presenter on RTÉ.

== Selected filmography ==
- Poitín (1978)
- The Blackwater Lightship (2004)
- Song of Granite (2017)

== Playography ==
- Katie Roche (1975)
