= Frewaka =

2024 film directed by Aislinn Clarke

Fréwaka
- Film poster
- Directed by: Aislinn Clarke
- Written by: Aislinn Clarke
- Starring: Bríd Ní Neachtain; Clare Monnelly
- Cinematography: Narayan Van Maele
- Music by: Die Hexen
- Production companies: Screen Ireland; Cine4; DoubleBand Films; Wildcard Distribution
- Distributed by: Shudder; Filmin; Hakuhodo DY Music & Pictures; Wildcard Distribution
- Release date: 9 August 2024
- Running time: 103 minutes
- Country: Ireland
- Languages: Irish Gaelic; English
- Box office: $21,893

Fréwaka (Note: The title Fréwaka comes from a word in the Irish language meaning "roots".) is a 2024 Irish folk horror film written and directed by Aislinn Clarke, starring Bríd Ní Neachtain, Clare Monnelly, and Aleksandra Bystrzhitskaya.

== Premise ==
A young woman named Siubhán ("Shoo") is a home care worker assigned to look after an elderly woman named Peig. Reluctant to be cared for, Peig shows signs of superstitious behavior as well as a belief that preternatural entities have abducted her in the past.

== Cast ==
- Bríd Ní Neachtain as Peig
- Clare Monnelly as Shoo
- Aleksandra Bystrzhitskaya as Mila

== Release ==
Fréwaka premiered in Switzerland in 2024 at the 77th Locarno Film Festival, and it premiered in the United States at the 60th Chicago International Film Festival.

== Reception ==
The film received generally positive reviews. On the review aggregator website Rotten Tomatoes, 96% of 26 critics' reviews are positive. Tara Brady of The Irish Times rated the film 4 stars out of 5, commenting that it "ambitiously mines Irish mythology and history for socially conscious spookery." Guy Lodge of Variety called the film "an expertly conducted atmospheric exercise, with a sharp, harsh understanding of closed rural communities." Zachary Lee of the Chicago Reader praised the film's "disquieting mood" and how it "keeps the audience on edge."
