= Muiris Mac Conghail =

Irish journalist (1941–2019)

Muiris Mac Conghail (12 May 1941 – 25 November 2019) was an Irish journalist, writer, broadcaster, poet, and film-maker.

== Early life ==
Mac Conghail was born in Dublin, son of artists Marcus Mac Conighail and Aida Kelly. His father, a cousin of Harry Clarke, had been a republican activist during the Irish War of Independence before studying, and then teaching, at the RHA schools.

Mac Conghail was educated at University College Dublin.

== Career ==
He joined Raidió Teilifís Éireann (RTÉ) in the 1960s, one of a group of young broadcasters which included Aindreas Ó Gallchóir, Breandán Ó hEithir, James Plunkett Kelly, Donal Farmer and Seán Mac Réamoinn. He became producer and editor of the current affairs programme 7 Days, which started broadcasting in 1966. He won a Jacob's Television Award in 1967 and 1985.

In May 1973, he was appointed Assistant Secretary at the Department of the Taoiseach and Head of the Government Information Bureau. I

He was RTÉ Controller of Programmes, television, 1977–1980 and 1983–1986.

In 2001 he delivered the Thomas Davis Lecture to mark the 75th anniversary of Radio Éireann -'Politics by Wireless'.

== Personal life ==
Mac Conghail married Máire Doran and they have five children, including Fiach, former Director of the Abbey Theatre. They separated in the 2000 and divorced in 2007.

Mac Conghail married Mary Malone in 2008: they had lived together for the previous 16 years.

== Select writings ==
- Aghaidheanna Fidil Agus Puicini (Biography of George Thompson)
- Island Funeral (1965)
- The Blaskets: A Kerry Island Library (1987) ISBN 0-946172-12-9
- The Blaskets – People and Literature
- Politics by Wireless: News and Current Affairs on Radio, 1926–2000 (2001)
- Essay on David Thornley in Unquiet Spirit: Essays in memory of David Thornley. Edited by Yseult Thornley (Liberties Press)
