= Pádraig Breathnach =

Irish writer (born 1942)

Pádraic Breathnach (born 12 July 1942) is an Irish short story writer and novelist who writes in the Irish language. He was born in Moycullen, County Galway and now lives in Limerick. He has won a number of Oireachtas prizes. He was also awarded The Butler Literary Award by The Irish American Cultural Institute in 1992. In 1972 he joined the school of Celtic Studies at the Dublin Institute for Advanced Studies.

Breathnach has been described as probably the most prolific short-story writer in Irish and as a stylist who is especially good at depicting youth and the natural world. It has been said of his work that it depicts a people inhabiting a harsh physical landscape that echoes their emotional landscape, a people with a pagan attachment to place, however unbountiful.

Collections include Bean Aonair (Clódhanna Teo., 1974), Buicéad Poitín (Clódhanna Teo., 1978), An Lánúin (F.N.T., 1979), Na Déithe Luachmhara Deiridh (Clódhanna Teo., 1980), Lilí agus Fraoch (Clódhanna Teo., 1983), Ar na Tamhnacha (Clódhanna Teo., 1987), Íosla agus Scéalta Eile (Clódhanna Teo., 1992), and An Pincín (Cló Iar-Chonnacht, 1996). His novels include Gróga Cloch (Cló Iar-Chonnachta, 1990) and As na Cúlacha (Cló Iar-Chonnacht, 1998).

In 1990 he published a cassette and booklet entitled Taomanna (Cló Iar-Chonnacht). He has also published a work on folklore and social history entitled Maigh Cuilinn: a Táisc agus a Tuairisc (Cló Chonamara, 1986).
