= Ráth Chairn =

Village and Gaeltacht area in County Meath, Ireland

Ráth Chairn Rathcairn
- Village and Gaeltacht area
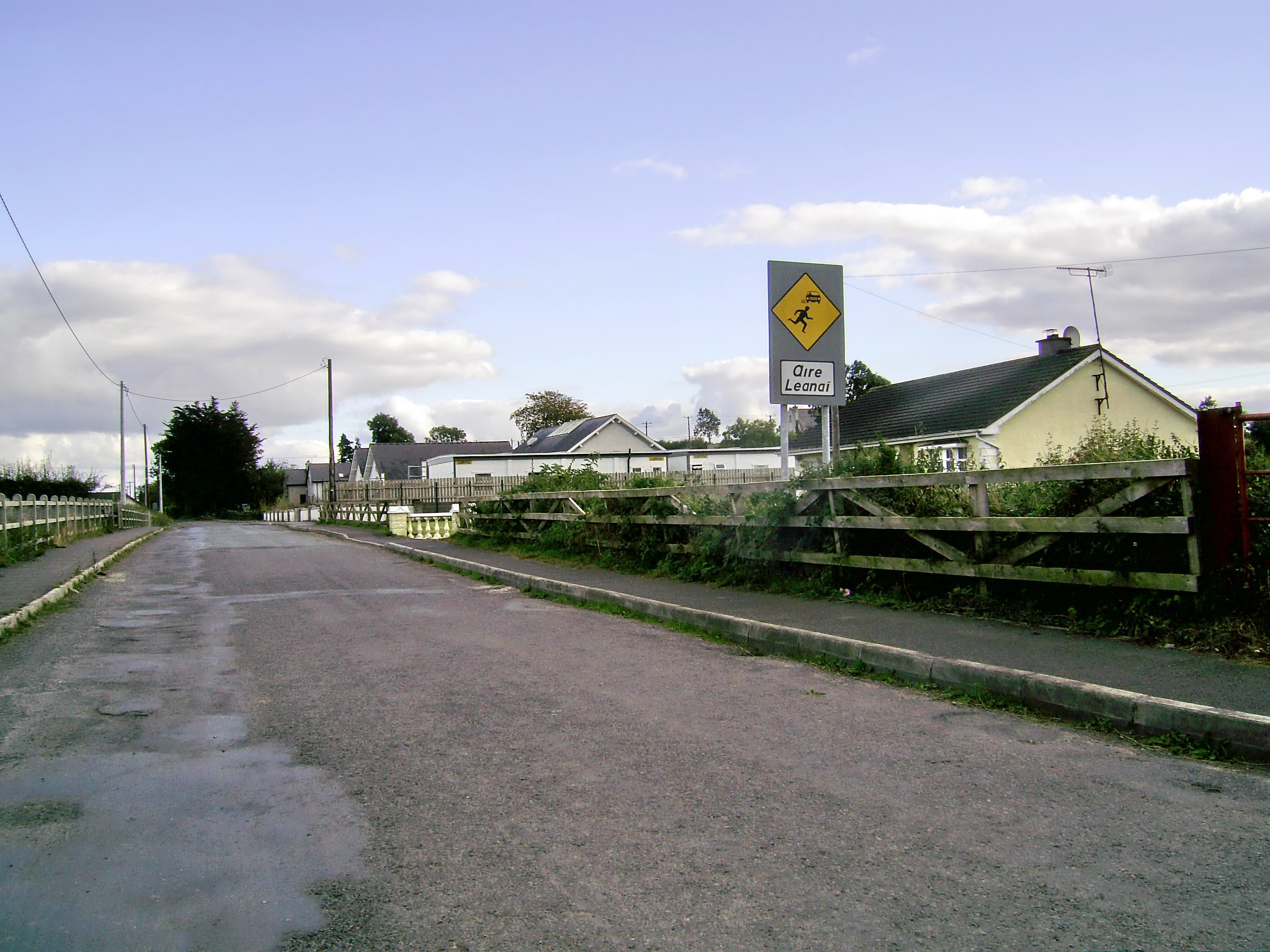

- Location in Ireland
- Coordinates: 53°36′39″N 6°51′48″W
- Country: Ireland
- Province: Leinster
- County: County Meath
- Elevation: 61 m (200 ft)

Population (2006)
  - Total: 447
- Irish Grid Reference: N800567
- As a Gaeltacht area, only the Irish language name, Ráth Chairn, has official status

Ráth Chairn (anglicised as Rathcairn or Rathcarran) is a small village and Gaeltacht area (Irish-speaking area) in County Meath, Ireland. It is about 55 km northwest of Dublin, in the triangle between Navan, Athboy and Trim. The Gaeltacht area was established in 1935, when 27 families from Connemara, mostly from Ceantar na nOileán, were settled on land previously acquired by the Irish Land Commission, followed by a further 11 families in 1937. In all 443 people moved to the area. In 1967 Ráth Chairn received official recognition as a Gaeltacht, following a local campaign. Today, it and the community of Baile Ghib, beyond Navan but fairly near, make up the Meath Gaeltacht. According to the 2016 census 16% of the combined populations of Ráth Chairn and Baile Ghib speak Irish on a daily basis outside the education system.

Since the project's launch, Ráth Chairn has grown into a village, with a Catholic church, a community hall, used for drama and RTÉ Raidió na Gaeltachta (also used by Coláiste na bhFiann during the summer months), sports facilities, an all-Irish primary school and an all-Irish secondary school, a library and a pub (An Bradán Feasa). A cooperative, the Ráth Chairn Cooperation Society (generally known by its Irish-language name, Irish: Comharchumann Ráth Chairn), was formed in 1973.

Several facilities in Ráth Chairn host children and adults wishing to learn Irish, and residential Irish language courses, Coláiste na bhFiann, are run for teenagers in the summer months.

== Public transport ==
Local Link route 188 provides a twice-daily bus service linking the village to Athboy, Navan and Drogheda.

== History ==
=== Establishment of the Meath Gaeltacht ===
The Meath Gaeltacht was formed when the Irish Land Commission redistributed large portions of the estates of landlords, and farmers from the Gaeltacht areas of the western seaboard were resettled in Meath in the 1930s. The migrants were from Cork, Kerry, Connemara, Mayo and Donegal. The government's goals were to relieve overcrowding and poverty in the western counties and to spread the Irish language. This "colony", as it was known, was also a social experiment to redress the 17th-century ethnic cleansing of Ireland by Oliver Cromwell's draconian action ‘To hell or Connaught’. However, due to the limited size of the Gaeltacht, the difficulty of providing a wide range of services through Irish led to bilingualism becoming necessary.

=== Foundation of Ráth Chairn ===
Ráth Chairn was founded in 1935 when 27 families from Connemara moved east to live on land acquired by the Land Commission. The initiative promised potential migrants a higher quality of life, greater crop yields than Connemara and newly built homes. The proposal also aimed to stop the decline of the Irish language by creating an Irish-speaking community in a new location. Each family was provided with a Land Commission house and a farm of approximately 8.9 hectares (22 acres), a sow, piglets and basic implements. A further 11 families joined the original settlers in 1937.

For the most part, when the migrants arrived, they were welcomed into a county where the ethos of the romantic Gaelic revival was in full swing. However, resentment manifested itself in local newspapers, that the migrants were given the land in preference to the local farmers. The Meath Chronicle reported on 27 April 1935 that a local Meath resident was arrested for threatening the life of a Land Commission employee but was released without charge and secondhand accounts report that a migrant woman was harassed by gangs and told "to quit talking that gibberish here".

== Notable people ==
- Liam Mac Cóil, novelist, critic and essayist
- Sibéal Ní Chasaide, sean-nós singer
- Bláthnaid Ní Chofaigh, television personality
- Darach Ó Catháin, sean-nós singer
- Ciarán Ó Cofaigh, director and producer

== See also ==
- List of towns and villages in Ireland
