= Fiach Mac Conghail =

Irish theatre director, politician and public servant (born 1964)

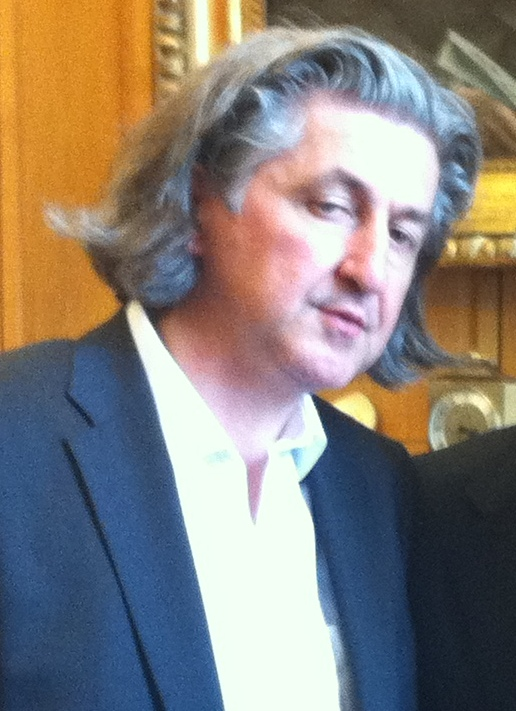
- Mac Conghail in 2011

Senator
- In office 25 May 2011 – 8 June 2016
- Constituency: Nominated by the Taoiseach

Personal details
- Born: 4 August 1964 (age 62) Dublin, Ireland
- Party: Independent
- Spouse: Bríd Ní Neachtain
- Children: 2

Fiach Mac Conghail (born 4 August 1964) is CEO of the Digital Hub Development Agency. He is a former director of the Abbey Theatre from 2005 to 2016. He is a former Senator from 2011 to 2016 and was appointed by the Taoiseach Enda Kenny.

== Early life ==
His father, Muiris Mac Conghail, was a filmmaker and broadcaster who served as Government Press Secretary and was Controller of Programmes at RTÉ; his mother is a noted genealogist. Mac Conghail was raised in the Dublin suburb of Rathgar and attended Coláiste Eoin and later Trinity College Dublin, where he studied Economics and Politics.

== Career in the arts ==
Mac Conghail was the artistic director at the Project Arts Centre from 1992 to 1999. He was the Director of Ireland's participation at the Expo 2000 world fair and acted as Cultural Programme Commissioner during the Irish Presidency of the European Union in 2004. With his brother Cuan, he established the production company Brother Films in 1996.

Mac Conghail was a special adviser to the Minister for Arts, Sport and Tourism John O'Donoghue from 2002 to 2005. In 2005, he was appointed as Director of the Abbey Theatre.

When Mac Conghail announced his 2016 programme, "Waking the Nation", for the centennial year of the 1916 Rising, a storm ensued. Only one of the ten plays on the programme was written by a woman and only three directed by women. This sparked a campaign called "Waking the Feminists" to demand gender equality in theatre. Mac Conghail acknowledged that he had "failed to check his privilege".

== Public life ==
He was appointed to Seanad Éireann in May 2011 and sat as an independent. He was the chairman of the We the Citizens, an initiative that aims to encourage the participation of the public in political affairs.

== Personal life ==
Mac Conghail is married to Bríd Ní Neachtain, and they have two daughters.
