= Iorras Aithneach =

Peninsula in Ireland

Coordinates: 53°19′37″N 9°49′18″W

Iorras Aithneach is an Irish-speaking peninsula in the West of County Galway with about 2,000 people living in the area. It is a predominantly Irish-speaking area, with 80% able to speak the language.

Carna and Cill Chiaráin are the two main villages. There are three electoral divisions, Abhainn Ghabhla, Scainimh and Cnoc Buí.

== Education ==
Carna is home to the National University of Ireland, Galway educational centre which offers a range of third-level courses. There is an Irish language college for second-level students in Carna and Cill Chiaráin called Coláiste Sheosaimh.

== See also ==
- Connemara
- Conamara Theas
- Gaeltacht Cois Fharraige
- Ceantar na nOileán
- Joyce Country
- Aran Islands
