= Ceantar na nOileán =

Ceantar na nOileán is an Irish-speaking (Gaeltacht) district in the west of County Galway, Ireland. The area is located in Connemara approximately 30 miles (48 km) west of Galway city. In 2016, 71.7% (1,474) of the approximately 2,057 people in the area (aged 3 years and over) spoke Irish daily outside the education system.

The islands of Ceantar na nOileán (meaning "group/area of islands") are connected by bridges to the mainland. The main islands in the archipelago include Leitir Móir, Garmna and Leitir Mealláin.

Tourism and fishing are the main sources of revenue in the area. The land is poorly suited to farming and the people have always had a strong bond with sea. Seaweed farming was important in the past on all of the islands especially for the production of iodine.

== See also ==
- Aran Islands
- Joyce Country
- Iorras Aithneach
