= Franz Nikolaus Finck =

German philologist (1867–1910)

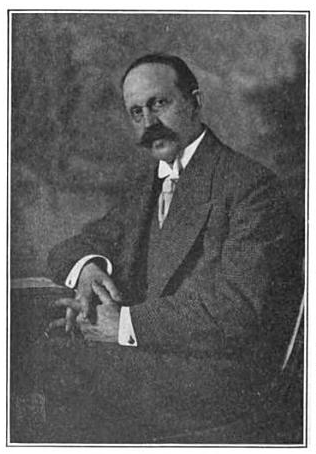
Franz Nikolaus Finck

Franz Nikolaus Finck (26 June 1867 – 4 May 1910) was a German philologist, born in Krefeld. He was a professor of General Linguistics at the University of Berlin.

Finck visited the Aran Islands of Ireland, where he lived with speakers of Irish Gaelic. His research on the phonology of Irish resulted in the book Die Araner Mundart: Ein Beitrag zur Erforschung des Westirischen (The Aran Dialect: A Contribution to the Study of Western Irish). This work was characteristic of Finck's emphasis on the study of remote dialects of languages.

He went on to work on a broad variety of languages, but was best known to his colleagues for his work on languages of the Caucasus. He also worked extensively on the Armenian language, compiling a grammar of that language.

Title page of Die Araner Mundart

Finck held the belief (now known to be mistaken) that all of the languages of the Caucasus were related.

Among his students was John Peabody Harrington.
