= Bríd Ní Neachtain =

Irish actress

- Born: 1959 (age 66–67); Galway, Ireland
- Occupation: Actress
- Years active: 1977–present
- Spouse: Fiach Mac Conghail
- Children: 2

Bríd Ní Neachtain (/ˈbriːd niː ˈnɒktən/; Irish: [bʲɾʲiːdʲ n̠ʲiː ˈnʲaxt̪ˠənʲ]; born 1959) is an Irish actress known for Dancing at Lughnasa.

== Early life ==
Born in Rosmuc, Neachtain is a native of Connemara. She starred in an adaptation of Máirtín Ó Cadhain's 1948 novel, Cré na Cille. She was educated at Coláiste Chroí Mhuire in Spiddal.

== Career ==
In her late teens, hearing that an assistant stage manager was leaving the Abbey Theatre, she wrote to Tomás Mac Anna, the director, and got the job. On occasion, he gave her small parts in Irish language plays and this later developed into larger roles in both Irish and English. After her performance in Silver Dollar Boys, Joe Dowling invited her to join the Abbey Actors. She remained with them until the 1990s when she left to work in TG4's soap, Ros na Rún. She is a former board member of Irish language broadcaster, TG4.

== Personal life ==
She is married to former Senator Fiach Mac Conghail; they have two children.

She appeared on an Irish 55-cent stamp in 2008, depicting her role in the film Cré na Cille.

== Filmography ==
=== Film ===
Year	Title	Role	Notes
2007	Cré na Cille	Caitríona Phaidín	Also called Graveyard Clay
2017	Song of Granite	Teacher	
2022	Róise & Frank	Róise	
2022	The Banshees of Inisherin	Mrs. O'Riordan	
2023	The Christmas Break	Nadine Reilly	
2024	Frewaka	Peig	

=== Television ===
Year	Title	Role	Notes
1983	Thursday Play Date	Máire Liam	Episode: "An Taobh Tuile"
1985	Cúirt an Mheán Oíche	Una	Television film
1993	Family	Mrs Busy Busy	Episode: "Paula"
1996–1999	Ros na Rún	Rita O'Connor	158 episodes
2004	Love Is the Drug	Imelda	Episode #1.2
2005	Pure Mule	Phil McKeon	4 episodes
2008	Seacht	May	Episode #1.3
2009	The Clinic	Patricia May	Episode #7.5
2010	An Crisis	Peigí	Episode #1.4
2012	Rásaí na Gaillimhe	Paula de Barra	4 episodes
2014	Scúp	Annie	Episode #2.5
2014	Corp & Anam	Breitheamh Hughes	2 episodes
2015–2017	An Klondike	Belinda Mulrooney	8 episodes
2017	Grace Harte	Deirbhle	3 episodes
