= Cré na Cille =

Irish language novel by Máirtín Ó Cadhain

- Author: Máirtín Ó Cadhain
- Translator: Alan Titley; Liam Mac Con Iomaire and Tim Robinson
- Language: Irish
- Publisher: Sáirséal agus Dill (1949); Yale University Press (2015); Cló Iar-Chonnacht (2016)
- Publication date: 1949
- Publication place: Ireland
- English publication date: 2016
- Media type: Print
- Pages: 364
- OCLC: 2674025
- Dewey Decimal: 891.6284
- LC Class: PB1399 .O28

Cré na Cille (pronounced [ˌcɾʲeː n̪ˠə ˈcɪl̠ʲə] kray-na-KIL-yə)) is an Irish language novel by Máirtín Ó Cadhain. It was first published in 1949 and is considered one of the greatest novels written in Irish.

== Title ==
Cré na Cille literally means "Earth of the Church"; it has also been translated as Graveyard Clay, Graveyard Soil, Graveyard Earth, Church and Clay and The Dirty Dust.

== Summary ==
The novel is written almost entirely as conversation between dead characters who are buried in a Connemara graveyard. The talk is full of gossip, backbiting, flirting, feuds, and scandal-mongering.

== Reception ==
The novel is considered a masterpiece of 20th century Irish literature and has drawn comparisons to the work of Flann O’Brien, Samuel Beckett, and James Joyce. In its serialised form, Cré na Cille was read aloud and gained classic status among Irish speakers. Cian Ó hÉigeartaigh, co-author of Sáirséal agus Dill, 1947-1981, claims that it invigorated the revival of Irish language writing in the 20th century.

== Publication history ==
Cré na Cille was serialised by The Irish Press newspaper and then published by Sáirséal agus Dill in 1949.

It was translated into Norwegian by Professor Jan Erik Rekdal and published in 1995 by Gyldendal Norsk Forlag as Kirkegårdsjord - gjenfortellinger i ti mellomspill, and translated into Danish by Ole Munch-Pedersen and published in 2000 by Husets Forlag as Kirkegårdsjord - genfortælling i ti mellemspil.

English translations of the novel were published in 2015 by Yale University Press and in 2016 by Cló Iar-Chonnacht. The first translation, The Dirty Dust, was by Alan Titley; the second, Graveyard Clay, was by Liam Mac Con Iomaire and the British cartographer Tim Robinson. An earlier translation by Joan Keefe was completed in 1984 as a doctoral dissertation, but never published.

The lack of an English translation for such a long period of time after the book’s first publication became part of its renown and was a matter of speculation. Three early attempts at translation by publisher Sáirséal agus Dill were thwarted, the first when the young woman selected as the translator joined a convent, the second by the refusal of the poet Thomas Kinsella, and the third by an unsatisfactory effort by a former prison-mate of Ó Cadhain's.

== Media Adaptations ==
=== Radio ===
A dramatised version of the novel was broadcast on RTÉ Raidió na Gaeltachta in 1973, and was revised and rebroadcast in 2006 as part of RTÉ's Ó Cadhain centenary celebrations.

=== Theatre ===
The novel was adapted for the stage by Macdara Ó Fátharta and was performed in 1996 and 2006. The role of Caitríona Pháidín was played by Bríd Ní Neachtain. The action was dramatised “in a cavernous space, with characters appearing from alcoves to interact with Caitríona, before slowly drifting back into the dimly lit set - reminding us that these people are gradually merging with the graveyard clay”. Bríd Ní Neachtain was nominated for an Irish Times Theatre Award for her performance in the play.

=== Film ===
A film adaptation, directed by Robert Quinn, was released in 2007. Like the stage play, it was written by Macdara Ó Fatharta and starred Bríd Ní Neachtain.
