= Máirtín Ó Cadhain =

Irish writer (1906–1970)

- Born: 4 January 1906; Spiddal, County Galway, Ireland
- Died: 18 October 1970 (aged 64); Dublin, Ireland
- Resting place: Mount Jerome Cemetery
- Occupations: Novelist, short story writer, journalist, school teacher
- Spouse: Máirín Ní Rodaigh
- Relatives: Seán Ó Cadhain (father); Bríd Nic Conaola (mother)
- Writing career
- Pen name: Aonghus Óg; Breallianmaitharsatuanógcadhanmaolpote; D. Ó Gallchobhair; Do na Fíréin; Micil Ó Moingmheara; M.Ó.C
- Language: Irish (Connacht Irish)
- Period: 1932–1970
- Genres: Fiction, politics, linguistics, experimental prose
- Subjects: Irish Republicanism, modern Irish prose
- Notable works: Cré na Cille; An Braon Broghach; Athnuachan
- Movements: Modernism, social radicalism

Signature
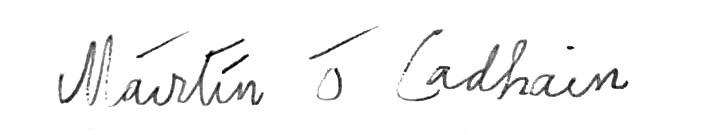

Máirtín Ó Cadhain (Irish pronunciation: [ˈmˠaːɾˠtʲiːnʲ oː ˈkəinʲ]; 4 January 1906 – 18 October 1970) was one of the most prominent Irish language writers of the twentieth century. Perhaps best known for his 1949 novel Cré na Cille, Ó Cadhain played a key role in reintroducing literary modernism into modern literature in Irish, where it had been dormant since the 1916 execution of Patrick Pearse. Politically, Ó Cadhain was an Irish republican and anti-clerical Marxist, who promoted Athghabháil na hÉireann (the "Re-Conquest of Ireland"), (meaning both decolonization and re-Gaelicisation). Ó Cadhain was also a member of the post-Civil War Irish Republican Army and was interned by the Irish Army in the Curragh Camp with Brendan Behan and many other IRA members during the Emergency.

== Literary career ==
Born in Connemara, he became a schoolteacher but was dismissed due to his Irish Republican Army (IRA) membership. In the 1930s, he served as an IRA recruiting officer, enlisting fellow writer Brendan Behan. During this period, he also participated in the land campaign of native speakers, which led to the establishment of the Ráth Cairn neo-Gaeltacht in County Meath. Subsequently, he was arrested and interned during the Emergency (the second world war period in Ireland) on the Curragh Camp in County Kildare, due to his continued involvement in the IRA.

Ó Cadhain's politics were Irish republicanism mixed with Marxism and radical politics, and then tempered with a rhetorical anti-clericalism. In his writings, however, concerning the revival of the Irish language, Ó Cadhain was very practical about the Catholic Church in Ireland but demanded commitment to the language revival from Roman Catholic priests. It was his view that, as the Church was there anyway, it would be better if the clergy were more willing to address their faithful in the Irish language.

As a writer, Ó Cadhain is acknowledged to be a major part of the revival of modernist literature in the Irish, where it had been largely dormant since the execution of Patrick Pearse in 1916. Ó Cadhain created a literary language for his writing out of the Conamara Theas and Cois Fharraige dialects of Connacht Irish, but he was often accused of an unnecessarily dialectal usage in grammar and orthography even in contexts where a realistic depiction of the Connemara vernacular wasn't called for. He was also happy to experiment with borrowings from other dialects, Classical Irish and even Scottish Gaelic. Consequently, much of what Ó Cadhain wrote is, like the poetry of fellow linguistic experimentalist Liam S. Gógan, reputedly very hard to understand for a non-native speaker.

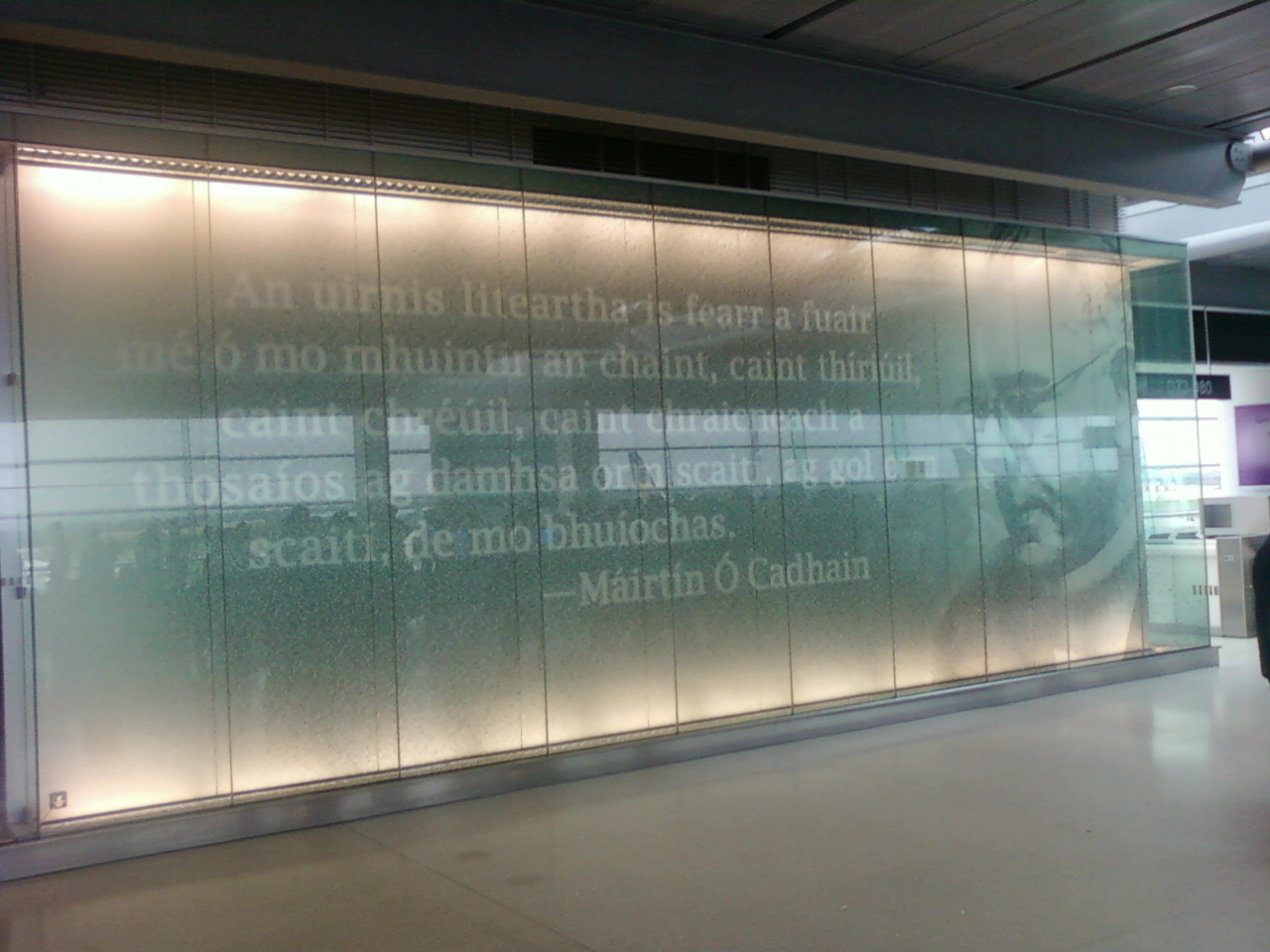
Memorial to Ó Cadhain at Dublin Airport: "The best literary tool I got from my folks is the language - a homely, earthy, polished language that may at times start me dancing and at times start me weeping, sometimes despite myself"

He was a prolific writer of short stories. His collections of short stories include Cois Caoláire, An Braon Broghach, Idir Shúgradh agus Dháiríre, An tSraith Dhá Tógáil, An tSraith Tógtha and An tSraith ar Lár. He also wrote three novels, of which only Cré na Cille was published during his lifetime. The other two, Athnuachan and Barbed Wire, appeared in print only recently. He translated Charles Kickham's novel Sally Kavanagh into Irish as Saile Chaomhánach, nó na hUaigheanna Folmha. He also wrote several political or linguo-political pamphlets. His political views can most easily be discerned in a small book about the development of Irish nationalism and radicalism since Theobald Wolfe Tone, Tone Inné agus Inniu; and in the beginning of the sixties, he wrote – partly in Irish, partly in English – a comprehensive survey of the social status and actual use of the language in the west of Ireland, published as An Ghaeilge Bheo – Destined to Pass. In August 1969, he delivered a speech (published as Gluaiseacht na Gaeilge: Gluaiseacht ar Strae) in which he spoke of the role Irish speakers should take in 'athghabháil na hÉireann', or the 'reconquest of Ireland' as James Connolly first coined the term.

He and Diarmaid Ó Súilleabháin were considered the two most innovative Irish language authors to emerge in the 1960s. Ó Cadhain had frequent difficulties getting his work edited, but unpublished writings have appeared at least every two years since the publication of Athnuachan in the mid-nineties.

In 1956, aged 50 years of age, he was appointed as a lecturer in the Department of Irish in Trinity College Dublin despite not having a degree or other typical academic credentials. He was appointed associate professor of Irish and Head of department fourteen years later in 1969. In 1970 he was appointed as Chair (full professor) and was made a fellow of the university before his death that same year.

A lecture hall in Trinity College Dublin is named after Ó Cadhain. There is also a bronze bust of him in the Irish department of the university.

== Political activity ==
Ó Cadhain's interest in Irish republicanism grew after he started reading An Phoblacht, a republican newspaper with strong links to the Irish Republican Army that publishes articles in both English and Irish. While living in Camus, County Galway (an Irish-speaking Gaeltacht village) he resided with Seosamh Mac Mathúna, who had been a member of the IRA since 1918. His time with Mac Mathúna further brought him down the path of republicanism and eventually, Mac Mathúna brought Ó Cadhain into the IRA. As a member, he championed a Marxist analysis of Ireland and was a particular advocate for Athghabháil na hÉireann (English: "The Reconquest of Ireland"), a concept of James Connolly's that suggests the Irish language could only be saved by socialism, as the English language is a tool of the capitalists.

In 1932, Ó Cadhain along with Mac Mathúna and Críostóir Mac Aonghusa (a local teacher, activist and county councillor) founded Cumann na Gaedhealtachta (The Gaeltacht Association), a pressure group to lobby on behalf of those living in Ireland's Gaeltacht areas. He formed a similar group in 1936 called Muinntir na Gaedhealtachta (the Gaeltacht People). One of the successes of these groups was the establishment of the Ráth Chairn Gaeltacht, in which a new Irish-speaking community was created in County Meath. Ó Cadhain had argued the only way by which Irish language speakers could thrive was if efforts to promote the language were coupled with giving Irish speakers good land to work, so as to give them an opportunity at economic success as well.

By 1936, Ó Cadhain had been working as a school teacher in Carnmore, County Galway for four years, when he was dismissed from his post by the Roman Catholic Bishop of Galway for his republican beliefs, which were deemed to be "subversive". He had recently attended a commemoration in Bodenstown to honour his idol Wolfe Tone, which had been banned by the government. He subsequently moved to Dublin, where he acted as a recruiter for the IRA, at which he was quite successful. In April 1938, he was appointed to the IRA's Army Council and became their secretary. By 1939, he was "on the run" from the Irish authorities and by September of the year had been arrested and imprisoned until December. Ó Cadhain's stint with the Army Council was short-lived however; he resigned in protest of the S-Plan, a sabotage campaign against the British state during the second world war, on the grounds that any attempt to "liberate" Northern Ireland politically was meaningless unless the people were also "economically liberated".

In 1940, he gave an oration at the funeral of his friend Tony Darcy, who had died on hunger strike in Mountjoy Prison seeking political prisoner status. Following the funeral he was once again arrested and imprisoned, this time to spend four years with hundreds of other IRA members in the Curragh. Ó Cadhain's friend Tomás Bairéad campaigned for his release and they found success on 26 July 1944 when Ó Cadhain was allowed to leave. During Ó Cadhain's time in the Curragh, he taught many of the other prisoners the Irish language.

Following his time in the Curragh, Ó Cadhain pulled back from politics to focus on his writing. For a long period he became bitter about Irish republicanism, but by the 1960s once again identified with its outlook. At the onset of the Troubles in Northern Ireland, he welcomed resistance to British rule as well as the idea of an armed struggle, and once again stated his Marxist outlook on the situation; "capitalism must go as well as the Border".

During the 1960s, he once again threw himself into campaigning on behalf of the Irish language, this time with the group Misneach ("Courage"). The group resisted efforts by reform groups to no longer make it compulsory for a student to pass an Irish examination to receive a Leaving Certificate, as well as a requirement that those seeking employment in the public sector needed to be able to speak Irish. Misneach used civil disobedience tactics influenced by Saunders Lewis, the Welsh language advocate and founder of Plaid Cymru.

Ó Cadhain was a key figure in the 1969 civil rights movement, Gluaiseacht Chearta Sibhialta na Gaeltachta.

== Personal life ==
He died on 18 October 1970 in Dublin and was buried in Mount Jerome Cemetery.

== Works ==
=== Novels ===
- Cré na Cille. Sáirséal agus Dill, Baile Átha Cliath, 1949/1965.
  - Translated as The Dirty Dust. Yale Margellos, New Haven 2015; translated as Graveyard Clay. Yale Margellos, New Haven, 2016.
- Fuíoll Fuine. Sáirséal agus Dill, 1970. Translated as The Dregs Of The Day, Yale Margellos, New Haven, 2019.
- Athnuachan. Coiscéim. Baile Átha Cliath, 1995.
- Barbed Wire. Edited by Cathal Ó hÁinle. Coiscéim, Baile Átha Cliath, 2002.

=== Short stories and collections ===
- An tSraith dhá Tógáil. Sáirséal agus Dill, Baile Átha Cliath, 1970/1981.
- Idir Shúgradh agus Dáiríre. Oifig an tSoláthair, Baile Átha Cliath, 1975, first edition was 1939.
- An tSraith Tógtha. Sáirséal agus Dill, Baile Átha Cliath, 1977.
- The Road to Brightcity. Poolbeg Press, Dublin, 1981.
- An tSraith ar Lár. Sáirséal Ó Marcaigh, Baile Átha Cliath, 1986.
- An Braon Broghach. An Gúm, Baile Átha Cliath, 1991.
- Cois Caoláire. Sáirséal – Ó Marcaigh, Baile Átha Cliath, 2004.
- Dhá Scéal / Two Stories. Arlen House, Galway, 2007.
- An Eochair / The Key. Dalkey Archive Press, Dublin, 2015.

=== Journalism and miscellaneous writings ===
- Ó Cadhain i bhFeasta. Edited by Seán Ó Laighin. Clódhanna Teoranta, Baile Átha Cliath, 1990.
- Caiscín. (articles published in the Irish Times 1953–56. Edited by Aindrias Ó Cathasaigh.) Coiscéim, Baile Átha Cliath, 1998.
- Caithfear Éisteacht! Aistí Mháirtín Uí Chadhain in Comhar (i.e. Máirtín Ó Cadhain's essays published in the monthly magazine Comhar). Edited by Liam Prút. Comhar Teoranta, Baile Átha Cliath, 1999.
- Tone Inné agus Inniu. Coiscéim, Baile Átha Cliath, 1999.
- An Ghaeilge Bheo – Destined to Pass. Edited by Seán Ó Laighin. Coiscéim, Baile Átha Cliath, 2002.
- Foclóir Mháirtín Uí Chadhain. (lexicographical work written and compiled between 1937 and 1946) An Gúm, Baile Átha Cliath, 2021.

== See also ==
- Pádraic Ó Conaire, earlier Irish language modernist
- Muintir na Gaeltachta, co-founded by Ó Cadhain
