= 1923 in Ireland =

- Centuries: 18th; 19th; 20th; 21st
- Decades: 1900s; 1910s; 1920s; 1930s; 1940s
- See also: 1923 in Northern Ireland; Other events of 1923; List of years in Ireland

Events from the year 1923 in Ireland.

== Incumbents ==
- Governor-General: Tim Healy
- President of the Executive Council: W. T. Cosgrave (CnaG)
- Vice-President of the Executive Council: Kevin O'Higgins (CnaG)
- Minister for Finance:
  - W. T. Cosgrave (CnaG) (until 21 September 1923)
  - Ernest Blythe (CnaG) (from 21 September 1923)
- Dáil:
  - 3rd (until 9 August 1923)
  - 4th (from 19 September 1923)
- Seanad: 1922 Seanad

== Events ==
=== January ===
- 13 January – Beechpark, the residence of President W. T. Cosgrave in Ballyboden, Dublin, was set on fire.
- 16 January – The Provisional Government of Ireland took office.

=== February ===
- 18 February – An amnesty for Irish Republican Army (IRA) Irregulars expired. It had been introduced by the Minister for Home Affairs, Kevin O'Higgins on 8 February.
- 21 February – An order was signed creating the Revenue Commissioners.

=== April ===
- 1 April – The Provisional Government established customs posts on the border with Northern Ireland.
- 11 April – Liam Lynch, Chief of Staff of the Irregulars, was wounded and captured by the Free State's National Army in the Knockmealdown Mountains. His subsequent death in Clonmel was also announced by the army.
- 14 April – Austin Stack was captured by National Army troops at the foot of the Knockmealdown Mountains.
- 30 April – Thousands turned up to greet Jim Larkin as he returned to Ireland after an eight-year absence in the United States.

=== May ===
- May–December – The Irish Transport and General Workers' Union staged a farm labourer's strike in County Waterford.
- 15 May – Neil 'Plunkett' Boyle was the last person to be killed during the Irish Civil War when he was shot dead while surrendering to the National Army at Knocknadruce near Valleymount, County Wicklow.
- 28 May – The Government released two captured documents issued by the IRA on 24 May. The letters, signed by Éamon de Valera and Frank Aiken (the new Chief of Staff) called for the dumping of arms and the ending of armed struggle. The Civil War was officially over.
- 31 May – The obelisk of 1736 commemorating the Battle of the Boyne (fought in 1690 at Oldbridge, County Meath) was blown up.

=== July ===
- 20 July – Éamon de Valera appealed to the American Association for the Recognition of the Irish Republic for $100,000 to fight the forthcoming general election.

=== August ===
- August – The British Royal Navy patrol ship HMY Helga was handed over to the Irish Coastal and Marine Service as the Public Armed Ship Muirchú.
- 2 August – Joe Whitty died on an independent hunger strike, the first of three IRA men to die in the 1923 Irish Hunger Strikes.
- 15 August – Éamon de Valera was arrested at an election meeting in Ennis, County Clare.
- 22 August – Fires at the Waterford offices of the Waterford News and Sinn Féin.
- 27 August – 1923 Irish general election: Cumann na nGaedheal under W. T. Cosgrave won most seats and formed a minority government.

=== September ===
- 10 September – Ireland was admitted into the League of Nations.
- 17 September – Thirty-three members presented themselves at Leinster House for the swearing in of the new Dáil. No anti-Treaty republicans attended.
- 19 September – The Fourth Dáil met for the first time at Leinster House. Michael Hayes was elected Ceann Comhairle and W. T. Cosgrave was elected President of the Executive Council.

=== October ===
- 13 October – 23 November – 1923 Irish Hunger Strikes: IRA prisoners in Irish gaols staged a hunger strike; two died.
- 15 October – The Mallow Viaduct over the River Blackwater was officially re-opened by President of the Executive Council, W. T. Cosgrave.

=== November ===
- 14 November – The poet William Butler Yeats became the first Irish Nobel prize laureate when he was awarded the Nobel Prize for Literature.

=== Full date unknown ===
- The Royal Bank of Ireland bought the Irish Free State business of the Belfast Banking Company (now Danske Bank), which in turn bought the Northern Ireland business of the Royal Bank of Ireland. See Allied Irish Banks.
- The General Assembly of the Church of Scotland called for curbs on the immigration of Irish Catholics.

== Arts and literature ==
- 12 April – Seán O'Casey's drama The Shadow of a Gunman, the first of his "Dublin Trilogy" (set in 1920), opened at the Abbey Theatre, Dublin.
- 14 November – W. B. Yeats won the 1923 Nobel Prize in Literature for his poetry.
- Elizabeth Bowen published her first book, a collection of short stories, Encounters, in London.
- Liam O'Flaherty published his first novel, Thy Neighbour's Wife.
- Mainie Jellett's Decoration was among the first abstract paintings shown in Ireland when exhibited at the Society of Dublin Painters Group Show.

== Sports ==
=== Association football ===
- League of Ireland
  Winners: Shamrock Rovers
  FAI Cup
  Winners: Alton United 1–0 Shelbourne. Played at Dalymount Park, Dublin, on 17 March 1923.
  Belfast side Alton United of the Falls District League were shock winners of the Free State Cup beating Shelbourne 1–0 in the final at Dalymount Park. Clubs and leagues in nationalist areas of Northern Ireland had affiliated to the FA of the Irish Free State after the 1921 split from the Belfast-based Irish Football Association.

=== Boxing ===
- World light heavyweight championship
  Winners: Mike McTigue defeated Battling Siki for the title on St Patrick's Day, 1923, at La Scala Theatre, Dublin.

=== Gaelic football ===
- The 1923 All-Ireland SFC winner was Dublin.
- June – 1921 All-Ireland Senior Football Championship completed.
- October – 1922 All-Ireland Senior Football Championship completed.

=== Hurling ===
- The 1923 All-Ireland SHC winner was Galway.
- March – 1921 All-Ireland Senior Hurling Championship completed, with the Liam MacCarthy Cup first presented after the 1921 final.
- September – 1922 All-Ireland Senior Hurling Championship completed.

== Births ==
- 2 January – Cathal Goulding, Chief of Staff of the IRA and the Official IRA (died 1998).
- 15 January – Tommy Eglington, association football player (died 2004).
- 31 January – Joseph Burke, cricketer (died 2005).
- 9 February – Brendan Behan, poet, novelist and playwright (died 1964).
- 20 March – Con Martin, association football player and manager (died 2013).
- 8 April – Edward Mulhare, actor (died 1997).
- 2 May – Patrick Hillery, Fianna Fáil party Teachta Dála (TD), cabinet minister, European Commissioner and sixth President of Ireland (died 2008).
- 24 May – Siobhán McKenna, actress (died 1986).
- May – Seán Óg Ó Ceallacháin, journalist, author and broadcaster (died 2013).
- 3 June – Maureen Flavin Sweeney, postmistress (died 2023).
- 11 June – Seán Condon, Cork hurler (died 2001).
- 17 June – W. M. Gorman, economist (died 2003).
- 23 June – Peter Corr, international association football player and father of The Corrs members (died 2001).
- 8 July – John Wilson, Fianna Fáil TD and Cabinet Minister, previously Cavan Gaelic footballer (died 2007).
- 10 September – Mickey Byrne, Tipperary hurler (died 2016).
- 23 September – Seán Treacy, Labour Party TD for Tipperary South, Ceann Comhairle of Dáil Éireann (died 2018).
- 8 October – Kathleen Mills, camogie player (died 1996).
- 29 October – Paddy Donegan, Fine Gael party TD and cabinet minister (died 2000).
- 10 November – Tommy Moroney, association football and rugby player (died 1981).
- 17 December – Dennis Flynn, soldier in Canada, Chairman of the Municipality of Metropolitan Toronto (died 2003).
- 21 December – Scott Huey, cricketer (died 2012).
- 25 December – Jim Tunney, Fianna Fáil TD, Minister of State and Lord Mayor of Dublin (died 2002).
- 28 December – Anthony Cronin, poet (died 2016).

== Deaths ==
- 28 January – George Richardson, soldier, recipient of the Victoria Cross for gallantry in 1859 at Kewane Trans-Gogra, India (born 1831).
- 25 March – Thomas Crean, surgeon, rugby player and soldier, recipient of the Victoria Cross for gallantry in 1901 at Tygerkloof Spruit, South Africa (born 1873).
- 10 April – Liam Lynch, commanding general of the anti-Treaty IRA during the Irish Civil War, shot and killed (born 1893).
- 17 April – Laurence Ginnell, nationalist, lawyer and politician, member of First Dáil (born 1852).
- 23 April – Seán Etchingham, Sinn Féin politician, member of First Dáil, cabinet minister (born 1868).
- 29 April – Robert Carew, 3rd Baron Carew (born 1860).
- 11 June – Herbert Trench, poet (born 1865).
- 16 July – Sydney Mary Thompson, geologist and botanist (born 1847).
- 9 August – O'Moore Creagh, soldier, recipient of the Victoria Cross for gallantry in 1879 at Kam Dakka, Afghanistan (born 1848).
- 20 October – Thomas MacPartlin, trade union official, elected to 1922 Seanad (born 1879).
- 9 November – Maurice Healy, lawyer, politician and Member of Parliament (born 1859).
- 20 November – Denny Barry, Irish Republican, in 1923 Irish Hunger Strikes (born 1883).
- 22 November – Andy O'Sullivan, agriculturalist and Irish Republican, died after 40 days on hunger strike in St. Bricin's Military Hospital, Dublin in 1923 Irish Hunger Strikes (born 1882).
- 5 December – Edward Martyn, playwright and activist (born 1859).
