= Joseph Burke =

Joseph or Joe Burke may refer to:

== Sports ==
- Joe Burke (baseball executive) (1923–1992), American Major League Baseball executive
- Joseph Burke (cricketer) (1923–2005), Irish cricketer
- Joe Burke (infielder) (1867–1940), 19th-century baseball player
- Joe Burke (outfielder), baseball right fielder in the Negro leagues
- Joe Burke (New Zealand footballer), New Zealand international football (soccer) player
- Joe Burke (rugby league) (born 1990), rugby league footballer for Wales, and South Wales Scorpions
- Joe Burke (American football) (born 1961), American football player

== Musicians ==
- Joe Burke (accordionist) (1939–2021), Irish accordion player
- Joe Burke (composer) (1884–1950), American actor, composer and pianist
- Sonny Burke (Joseph Francis Burke, 1914–1980), American musician

== Others ==
- Joseph Burke (botanist) (1812–1873), English collector of plants and animals
- Joseph Burke (politician) (1853– after 1888), land surveyor and political figure in Manitoba
- Joseph A. Burke (1886–1962), bishop of Buffalo
- Joseph Burke (judge) (1888–1990), Illinois judge
- Joseph Burke (art historian) (1913–1992), British art historian
- Joseph C. Burke (born 1932), American educator
- Joseph Burke, a World War II veteran in the novel Double Play from Robert B. Parker
- Sir Joseph Burke, 11th Baronet of the Burke baronets

== See also ==
- Burke (surname)
- Joe Burk (1914–2008), American oarsman and coach
- Joe Burks (1899–1968), American football player
- Joseph Berke, American psychotherapist
- Joseph M. Burck (1931–2020), senior designer and toy inventor at Marvin Glass and Associates
