= Insurrection (O'Flaherty novel) =

Book by Liam O'Flaherty

- First US edition (publ. Little, Brown, 1951)
- Author: Liam O'Flaherty
- Subject: Easter Rising
- Set in: Dublin
- Published: 1950

Insurrection is a 1950 novel by the Irish novelist Liam O'Flaherty. The story takes place during the Easter Rising in Dublin in 1916.

== Plot ==
The novel follows a diverse group of characters who are caught up in the events of the 1916 Easter Rising in Dublin. The group are dispatched to defend the main road from Dublin to Dún Laoghaire (Dublin's main port) from the expected arrival of British reinforcements. The novel explores each man's motivations, fears and hopes through the battles and violence which ensue. The principal characters are: The uneducated, slow-witted Bartly Madden; Kinsella, the disciplined commander of a small band of insurgents; Stapleton, an anarchist and would-be poet; and Tommy Colgan, a youth consumed by fear and self-doubt.

== Critical reception ==
Insurrection received generally positive reviews, although it was compared unfavourably to some of O'Flaherty's other work, such as The Informer and Famine. Kirkus Reviews described it as "A vigorous, penetrating study of organized rebellion beside which the Hemingway revolutionists are very cold potatoes." Writing in The Saturday Review, a U.S. literary magazine, Thomas Sugrue said, "Like the rebellion itself, the book is brief, sharp, blazing with action and lit by a radiance of idealism which softens the ugly reality with which it deals, while at the same time illuminating the ugliest of its details. It may well be the best thing O'Flaherty has done." The Irish monthly literary publication The Bell (1940–54) was more reserved: its (anonymous) reviewer said, "It might be said that only readers who know nothing of about Easter Week could get the best value out of Insurrection. But will even such readers take as a matter of course those brief passages in which Mr. O'Flaherty attempts to find philosophical meaning for the desperate act of violence by lifting particular events from the plane on which they have vividness at least to a plane where they are coloured clouds of abstraction?" John Hildebidle, in Five Irish Writers, was equally indifferent. "In trying to make fiction out of what amounts to a theory of revolutionary history", Hildebidle wrote, "he [O'Flaherty] produces characters with none of the persuasive energy and substance of his earlier novels". The literary review website Goodreads gave Insurrection a 3.67 out of 5 rating.
