= Thy Neighbor's Wife =

Thy Neighbor's Wife may refer to:

- Thy Neighbor's Wife (book), a non-fiction book by Gay Talese
- Thy Neighbor's Wife (1953 film), an American drama film
- Thy Neighbor's Wife (2001 film), an erotic thriller film

== See also ==
- Thy Neighbour's Wife, a novel by Liam O'Flaherty
