= Uptight (film) =

1968 film by Jules Dassin

- Film poster
- Directed by: Jules Dassin
- Written by: Jules Dassin; Ruby Dee; Julian Mayfield
- Based on: The Informer; 1925 play by Liam O'Flaherty
- Produced by: Jules Dassin; Jim Di Gangi
- Starring: Raymond St. Jacques; Ruby Dee; Julian Mayfield; Janet MacLachlan; Roscoe Lee Browne
- Cinematography: Boris Kaufman
- Edited by: Robert Lawrence
- Music by: Booker T. & the MG's
- Production company: Marlukin Productions
- Distributed by: Paramount Pictures
- Release date: December 18, 1968
- Running time: 104 minutes
- Country: United States
- Language: English

Uptight (also known as UpTight! or Up Tight!) is a 1968 American drama film directed by Jules Dassin. It was intended as an updated version of John Ford's 1935 film The Informer, based on the book of the same name by Liam O'Flaherty, but the setting was transposed from Dublin to Cleveland. The soundtrack was performed by Booker T. & the MG's. The assassination of Martin Luther King Jr. is used as a backdrop for the film's fictional narrative.

== Plot ==
In Cleveland, Ohio, at the time of the assassination of Martin Luther King Jr., protesters riot in the streets. Johnny Wells, a charismatic black revolutionary, leads a group of black men on a mission to steal guns from a warehouse as preparation for violent racial conflict. Johnny's best friend Tank, who formerly worked at the steel mill with several of the men, is supposed to help with the robbery, but when the group goes to his house, they find him drunk and watching the television coverage of King's funeral. Tank is a middle-aged, unemployed alcoholic who supported King's non-violent approach, which the others have rejected in favor of violent revolution. It is later revealed that Tank lost his longtime job at the steel mill when he attacked a white co-worker who harassed the black mill workers. As a result, Tank was sent to prison and since being released, has been unable to find work. The black revolutionary group is going through a deeper radicalization, and they see Tank's inconsistent behavior as threatening to their cause.

Johnny attempts to sober Tank up and tries to coerce him into coming along for the robbery. Tank being drunk and upset refuses to go. Johnny leaves without him since Tank has let them down previously. At first things go smoothly because the white security guard is asleep, but since the robbers are short one man, Johnny needs to make a second trip into the warehouse to steal enough guns, the guard then wakes up and fires on the robbers. Johnny returns fire and kills the guard. In the melee Johnny leaves behind his sweater with his name tag in it, and thus becomes a wanted man.

The next day, Tank, feeling remorseful, goes to visit B.G., the leader of the revolutionary group, and his girlfriend Jeannie, who is Johnny's sister. B.G. and Jeannie are angry that Tank failed to help with the robbery, and Jeannie blames him for Johnny ending up a fugitive. Tank begs B.G. to find him work as a bodyguard, pointing out that he is broke. But B.G. tells him the committee has decided to expel him from the group due to his drinking and unreliability, noting that they do not have time to run a rehab.

On the street, Tank meets Clarence "Daisy", a homosexual black man who makes good money as a police informant. Daisy brings Tank to his fancy apartment, plies him with drink, and shows him two photographs: one of them shows Tank fighting two police officers during a riot, and the other one is Johnny's wanted poster advertising a $1,000 reward for information. Daisy suggests that if Tank helps find Johnny, then Daisy might make the photo of Tank fighting the officers disappear from the police files.

The disillusioned Tank seeks comfort from his girlfriend Laurie, a single mother who lives in the Hough ghetto neighborhood and supports her two small children through a combination of welfare and prostitution. When Tank arrives at Laurie's house, he has to hide because the representative of the welfare office is visiting Laurie to verify that she does not "have a man around," which would cause her welfare benefits to be terminated. The representative spots Tank and starts berating him and putting him down for not working and supporting his children (though Laurie argues they aren't his). Tank, who is already feeling bad about himself, angrily throws the representative into the street where he is nearly hit by a car. Tank begs Laurie to come away with him, but Laurie, upset about losing her meager welfare benefits and Tank not having any money to give her, dumps him.

When Tank is leaving Laurie's, a voice calls him from inside of a burnt house. It is Johnny, who has been hiding near Laurie's house looking for Tank. Johnny tells Tank he doesn't blame him for the failed robbery, saying Tank is "from another era" and not prepared to join in revolutionary activities. Johnny also tells Tank that he plans to leave town, but needs to visit his sick mother first, though it's risky. He asks Tank to go to the revolutionaries' meeting that night and have them send some men to watch outside his mother's house while he visits. Tank begs Johnny to please talk to B.G. about getting him reinstated in the revolutionary group. They leave each other saying they love each other.

Tank bursts in on the revolutionaries' meeting and relays the message from Johnny. B.G. sends men to Johnny's house but when Tank tries to go as well, B.G. won't let him and reiterates that he is out of the group. Tank argues that Johnny trusted him to deliver the message, and B.G. says that Johnny was the one who told them to get rid of Tank. Tank, stunned and upset by this news, walks out of the meeting, goes to the police station and informs on Johnny. The police rush to Johnny's mother's apartment and shoot Johnny dead as he tries to escape.

Meanwhile, Tank goes to a bar and uses the reward money to buy everybody many drinks. The bar patrons assume Tank won his money in the local numbers game lottery. Tank then wanders aimlessly around town, donating money to a street preacher, visiting the steel factory where he worked for 20 years, and stopping at an amusement arcade where he shoots a cowboy puppet and rambles about black revolution with some wealthy, slumming white people in front of "fun-house" distortion mirrors. After a long night of drinking and wandering, a drunken Tank goes to Johnny's wake, where he sees Johnny's grieving mother, sister and revolutionary friends. His guilty demeanor, plus leaving a large donation in the collection for Johnny's family, arouses the suspicions of B.G. and the others. Tank tries to deflect their suspicion onto Daisy, but when they confront Daisy, Daisy convinces them that Tank was actually the informant.

The revolutionaries question Tank and hold their version of a trial, and Tank is sentenced to death. Two of his ex-comrades take him out to a burning scrapyard to kill him, but he manages to get away, hop a passing train, and hide in a rundown hotel on the edge of the Flats, an industrial area. He calls Laurie, who visits him. He confesses to her what he did, and they both recognize he is "a dead man". Tank says he doesn't understand why he did it, and that Laurie and Johnny were the only people in the world he ever loved. Laurie says she loves him.

Tank leaves the hotel and wanders through the Flats. The men assigned to kill him see him, and pursue him to an area where iron ore is kept in huge piles. Tank climbs to a platform over an ore pile, and waves and shouts at them. One of the men can't bring himself to shoot Tank, so the other one grabs the gun and fires. Tank, dying, falls from the platform into the ore pile. A giant excavator dumps several tons of iron ore over his body.

== Cast ==
- Raymond St. Jacques as B.G.
- Ruby Dee as Laurie
- Frank Silvera as Kyle
- Roscoe Lee Browne as Clarence "Daisy"
- Julian Mayfield as "Tank" Williams
- Janet MacLachlan as Jeannie
- Max Julien as Johnny Wells
- Juanita Moore as Mama Wells
- Dick Anthony Williams as Corbin
- Ji-Tu Cumbuka as Rick
- John Wesley as Larry
- Ketty Lester as Alma
- Robert DoQui as Street Speaker
- Isabel Cooley as Melina
- Leon Bibb as Mr. Oakley
- James McEachin as "Mello"

== Production ==
The film was shot on location in the Hough neighborhood in Cleveland, Ohio. In 1969, Variety reported that the Federal Bureau of Investigation "closely monitored the making of Uptight right up to the eve of its premiere." The FBI was first alerted to the subject matter of the film by employees at Paramount Pictures in May 1968. During its production, crew members and studio workers acted as informants to agents at the FBI's Cleveland office, who directly reported details of the set to bureau director J. Edgar Hoover.

== Release ==
Uptight premiered in New York City on December 18, 1968. The film was released on DVD by Olive Films on October 16, 2012.

== Reception ==
Roger Ebert rated the film 3 out of 4 stars and called it a "good and interesting film" that realistically portrays black militancy without watering down the subject matter for white audiences. However, Ebert criticized the decision to shoot the film as a remake of a story that has too little in common with black civil rights.

Clifford Terry of the Chicago Tribune called it "a crude, clumsy film using an outdated story in a new framework." Despite writing that "the acting is as stilted as the script," he praised the performances of St. Jacques "who displays a José Ferrer-like surety" and Silvera.

Vincent Canby of The New York Times stated that it "is such an intense and furious movie that it's impossible not to take it seriously" and "the effect – on the big movie theater screen – is stunning and hair-raising." He pointed out the film's primary drawback being that it "exercises a kind of double standard – dealing with a very contemporary scene in movie terms that are 30 years out of date." He added that "the screenplay,...has the sound of authenticity" but "it doesn't pack much drama, principally,...because the subsidiary characters all are more interesting than Tank."

Richard Schickel of LIFE called it "a dumb movie" and "a travesty, a soulless work in both the old and new meanings of the word." He explained, "Remakes are invariably the sign of impoverished imaginations. I don't know of one that ever approached the quality of the original and it seems to me scandalous that Hollywood's initial, belated recognition of black militancy should be to haul out a 34-year-old property, shoot it in color and pretend it is being relevant when, in fact, all we are getting is another dose of the Carmen Jones syndrome."

On the review aggregator website Rotten Tomatoes, 80% of 5 critics' reviews are positive.
