= Tom O'Flaherty =

Tom O'Flaherty may refer to:

- Tom Maidhc O'Flaherty (1890–1936), Irish communist politician
- Tom O'Flaherty (rugby union) (born 1994), English rugby union footballer
