= Jenico Dartasso =

Gascony-born soldier and statesman

Sir Jenico d'Artois, Dartas, Dartass or Dartasso (c.1350 – November 1426) was a Gascony-born soldier and statesman, much of whose career was spent in Ireland. He enjoyed the trust and confidence of three successive English monarchs, and became a wealthy landowner in Ireland.

== Early career ==
Although the best-known version of his surname suggests Artois as his birthplace, historians agree that he was a native of Gascony. This province in France, which had been part of the dowry of Eleanor of Aquitaine on her marriage in 1152 to Henry II of England, was in the fourteenth century still an English possession. Little seems to be known about his parents. He had at least one brother, Sampson, to whom he remained close throughout his life. It has been suggested that he was a "rootless" individual, who ultimately settled in Ireland because he had no strong ties anywhere else. He was popularly known as "the Gascon squire".

D'Artois served in the garrison of Cherbourg in 1367 and 1368, during the time when the town was a possession of Charles II of Navarre. In January 1379, he was involved in the capture and ransom of Olivier de Geusclin, a brother of Bertrand du Guesclin, the Constable of France. By that time, the garrison at Cherbourg was being shared with English soldiers. D'Artois switched his allegiance from Navarre to England, and by December 1380 had moved to the garrison at Guînes, within the Pale of Calais. He had acquired the patronage of Henry Percy, 1st Earl of Northumberland, by 1384, and subsequently entered the service of the earl's son, Henry "Hotspur" Percy. D'Artois commanded one of Hotspur's ships on his 1387 expedition to relieve Brest, and the following year was captured alongside him at the Battle of Otterburn.

== Servant of the English Crown ==
In 1390, d'Artois joined the Barbary Crusade led by Louis II, Duke of Bourbon. He subsequently joined Henry of Bolingbroke (the future Henry IV of England) in Lithuania, fighting with the Teutonic Knights. His exploits there brought him to the attention of John Waltham (the Lord High Treasurer under Richard II), who recruited him as a household esquire. In September 1392, d'Artois entered the employ of Richard II, and by 1394 he is known to have been high in the King's favour.

He accompanied the King on his military expedition to Ireland in that year and distinguished himself as a soldier, fighting against the Gaelic clans in Counties Carlow and Kilkenny. He received a substantial grant of land in south County Dublin "for his good service against the Irish of Leinster and for his constant loyalty". D'Artois was not especially grateful for this reward, and made the celebrated complaint that: "it would be worth more than a thousand marks a year if it were near London, but I have such trouble keeping it that I would not wish to live here for long, for a quarter of the whole land of Ireland". He also complained of his difficulty in gaining possession of the lands granted to him; this applied in particular to Carrickmines, to which the Walsh family also had a claim, which was ultimately successful. He claimed the manor of Huntspill Marreys in Somerset, but the King upheld the rival claim of James Butler, 3rd Earl of Ormond. In 1397 the King ordered payment to him, jointly with Robert de Faryngton (shortly afterwards to be Lord Treasurer of Ireland), in respect of the marriages of the three daughters of Robert Ufford - Ela, Sybilla and Joan - by his wife Eleanor Felton, daughter of Sir Thomas Felton, who were royal wards. Sybilla became a nun; her sisters married into the Bowett family.

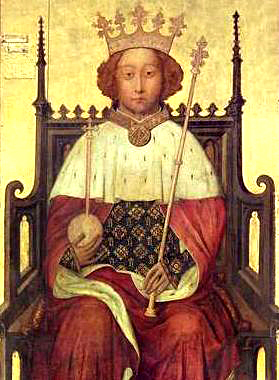
King Richard II of England, whom Jenico d"Artois served loyally until his deposition and death.

In 1398, when Roger Mortimer, 4th Earl of March, the Lord Lieutenant of Ireland, was killed in a skirmish with the O'Brien clan at Kells, County Meath, d'Artois was put in charge of taking reprisals against the O'Briens. It was reported that he "slew, captured or brought into submission many of the Irish".

== His service with the House of Lancaster ==
He accompanied Richard II on his ill-fated return to England in 1399, and as Richard's enemies moved to depose him, Jenico, who was known to be one of the King's staunchest supporters, was arrested at Chester. After Richard's forced abdication, and his death early in 1400, given Jenico's record of loyalty to the late King, the new regime might have been expected to execute him for treason, as was the fate of several of Richard's advisers. D'Artois did not help his case by stubbornly continuing to wear Richard's livery (insignia). However, he had several influential friends in the new regime who pleaded for clemency on his behalf. The new King Henry IV clearly valued Jenico for his military ability (they had, of course, served together with the Teutonic Knights in Lithuania). His loyalty to Richard was not held against him, and he received a royal pardon. In 1407 he was released from repayment of all debts owed to the Crown.

He served in the large English army which invaded Scotland in August 1400. This army was led by the King in person: Henry IV hoped to take advantage of the serious political divisions in Scotland to persuade the aged and infirm King Robert III of Scotland to acknowledge the King of England as his feudal overlord, a claim which the English Crown had revived periodically over the centuries, but which the Scots had always rejected. It is unlikely that Jenico's military skills were needed during the campaign, as the Scots army prudently refused to give battle, and Henry, who was anxious to maintain the image of a benevolent overlord, gave strict orders that there should be no looting or pillaging. After a fortnight the English army withdrew from Scotland, having accomplished nothing.

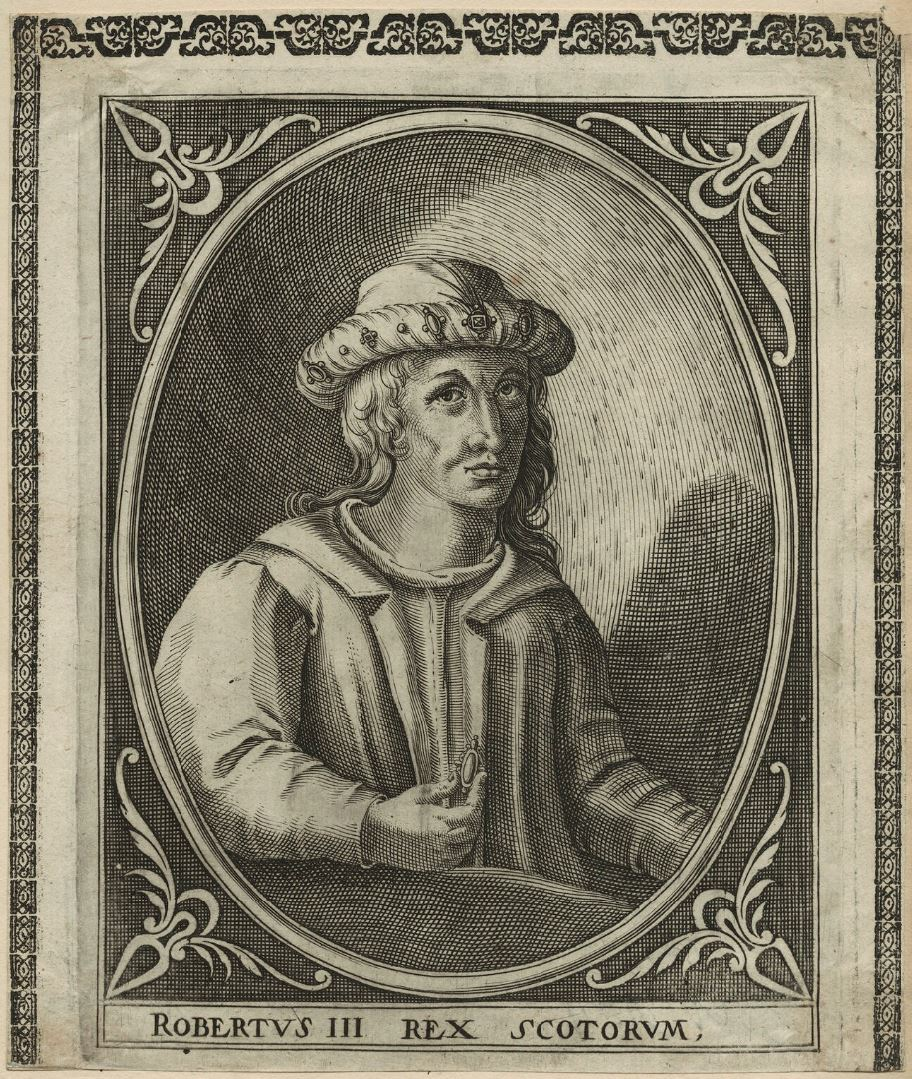
King Robert III of Scotland – d'Artois served in the English army which invaded his kingdom in 1400.

Jenico was made Constable of Dublin Castle in about 1401, and he subsequently became High Sheriff of Meath and one of the Keepers of the Peace for the County, Seneschal of Ulster, and Admiral of Ireland. He did not as might have been expected (as he was by then probably the senior military commander in Ireland) play any role in the Battle of Bloody Bank in July 1402, in which the people of Dublin scored a decisive victory over the O'Byrne clan of County Wicklow. Leadership of the Dublin men was entrusted to the Mayor of Dublin, John Drake, who became a popular hero as a result. Jenico himself is said to have been fighting in defence of his wife's lands in County Meath at the time.

He was appointed a member of the council which advised the King's son, Thomas of Lancaster, 1st Duke of Clarence, who was Chief Governor of Ireland from 1401 to 1413. He was given charge of Trim Castle, and manor, and complained in 1403 that the manor tenants were not paying their rent. He acquired substantial lands in Counties Meath, Louth, and Down; his principal seat was at Ardglass in County Down. His marriage in about 1401 to the County Meath heiress Joan Taaffe, widow of Chief Justice Rowe, made him a prominent member of the Anglo-Irish gentry of the Pale as well as bringing him further lands in County Meath. The Earl of Ormonde, who had once quarrelled with him over the right to hold lands in Somerset, was now anxious to be his friend, and made over to him the rents of another Ormonde property in Buckinghamshire. In 1415 the King gave him a present of a royal barge, La Cateryn of Drogheda. In 1422 he was granted lands at Clane, County Kildare, formerly held by Sir Christopher Preston. A shrewd man of business, he is found petitioning the English Parliament at Westminster concerning various grants of land only months before his death. The matter was not finally resolved until after his death.

Henry V shared his two predecessors' trust in Jenico: in 1413 he was appointed joint Governor of Ireland in the absence of the Lord Lieutenant of Ireland, and he served with the King in France in 1415 and 1418. He died in November 1426.

== Marriages and descendants ==
He married firstly, before 1402, Joan or Joanne Taaffe, daughter of Sir Nicholas Taaffe of Liscarton Castle, near Navan, and widow of Peter Rowe, Lord Chief Justice of Ireland. She died before 1414. His second wife Elizabeth, of whose family little seems to be known, outlived him and was one of the executors of his will. In 1427 the Crown ordered that she be left in peaceful possession of certain lands which had been granted to her and Jenico jointly.

He had three children by his first marriage

- Sir John (born before 1406, living 1450). He was described in the Patent Roll of 1427 as the eldest son and heir, and was then of age, but appears to have died without issue;
- Jenico the younger (living 1459);
- Jane, who married firstly Christopher Preston, 3rd Baron Gormanston, by whom she had issue, including Robert and Elizabeth, and secondly Giles Thorndon, former Lord Treasurer of Ireland.

The younger Jenico married firstly Jane Serjeant, daughter and co-heiress of Sir Robert Serjeant of Castleknock. Sir Robert's death led to a bitter dispute over the Serjeant inheritance between Jenico and Sir Nicholas Barnewall, the Lord Chief Justice of Ireland, who had married Jane's sister and co-heiress Ismay. Jenico the younger held the office, presumably a sinecure, of Chirographer (engrosser of fines) to the Court of Common Pleas (Ireland).

Young Jenico and Jane had an only daughter and heiress Margaret, who married firstly Sir John Dowdall of Newtown, and secondly Rowland FitzEustace, 1st Baron Portlester. Since their daughter Katherine was later legitimated by an act of Parliament, it is clear that Margaret and Rowland were cohabiting before their marriage. Through Rowland's daughter Alison, Countess of Kildare (died 1495), most of the d'Artois inheritance passed by descent to the Earl of Kildare. Margaret, who was Rowland's third wife, was probably Alison's mother. However, there is some doubt about which of Rowland's children was born to which mother. After Jane's death Jenico became the third husband of the much-married Maud Plunkett, daughter of Christopher Plunkett, 1st Baron Killeen. She outlived him and made yet another marriage. She died in 1482. A colourful story about her previous marriage inspired a much later ballad: "The Bride of Malahide".

Sampson d'Artois, Chancellor of the Exchequer of Ireland 1424–1431, was a close relative, probably a brother, of Jenico. He was co-executor with Jenico's widow, and one Nicholas Bayley, of his will.

D'Artois' unusual first name was preserved by the Preston family, descendants of his daughter Jane; many of the Preston boys down the generations were named Jenico. His granddaughter Lady Portlester was usually referred to as Margaret Jenico. A possible descendant is Irish politician John Dardis (born 1945).

== Personality ==
Jenico has been described as one of the most flamboyant characters in the Europe of his era: "a man of action and vivid personality". He was a military adventurer who undoubtedly "feathered his own nest" during his years in Ireland, and yet he gave good and loyal service to three English monarchs and earned the trust of all of them. Edmund Curtis remarks that if there had been more men of his calibre in 15th century Ireland, the English Crown's hold on the country would have been far more secure.
