= The Informer (O'Flaherty novel) =

1925 book by Liam O'Flaherty

- 1st edition cover (UK)
- Author: Liam O'Flaherty
- Language: English
- Genre: spy novel
- Set in: Dublin, early 1920s
- Published: 1925
- Publisher: Jonathan Cape (UK); Alfred A. Knopf (US)
- Publication place: Irish Free State
- Media type: Print: hardcover octavo
- Pages: 272
- Awards: James Tait Black Memorial Prize
- Dewey Decimal: 823.912
- LC Class: PR6029 .F5
- Preceded by: Thy Neighbour's Wife
- Followed by: Return of the Brute

The Informer is a novel by Irish writer Liam O'Flaherty published in 1925. It received the 1925 James Tait Black Memorial Prize.

== Plot summary ==
Set in 1920s Dublin in the aftermath of the Irish Civil War, the novel centers on "Gypo" Nolan. Having disclosed the whereabouts of his friend Frankie McPhillip to the police for a reward, Gypo finds himself hunted by his revolutionary comrades for this betrayal.

== Character list ==
- Gypo Nolan - The informer of the novel's title, he is an ex-policeman and member of the Revolutionary Organization.
- Frankie McPhillip - Gypo Nolan's "bosom friend" and a member of the Revolutionary Organization, he is wanted for a murder committed during a farm labourers' strike and is betrayed to the police by Gypo.
- Dan Gallagher - A commandant of the Revolutionary Organization bent on finding and killing the informer.

== Adaptations ==
Most famously, the novel was made into a film of the same name by John Ford in 1935 starring Victor McLaglen as Gypo Nolan. The film won four Academy Awards, including the Oscar for Best Actor for McLaglen, Best Writing, Adapted Screenplay for Dudley Nichols and director Ford’s first of a record four wins for the Oscar for Best Directing.

The Informer later served as the basis for Jules Dassin's American drama Uptight, setting the story in the shadow of Martin Luther King Jr.'s assassination and adapting it to the American Civil Rights Movement.

An earlier film adaptation also named The Informer was directed by Arthur Robison in 1929.

It was adapted for Australian radio in 1940 starring Peter Finch.
