= Breandán Ó hEithir =

Irish writer and broadcaster

- Born: 18 January 1930; Inishmore, Aran Islands, County Galway, Ireland
- Died: 26 October 1990 (aged 60); Dublin, Ireland
- Occupations: Writer, journalist, broadcaster
- Spouse: Catherine von Hildebrand
- Writing career
- Genres: Fiction, autobiography, politics, geography
- Subject: Modern Irish prose
- Notable work: Lig Sinn i gCathú

Breandán Ó hEithir (18 January 1930 – 26 October 1990) was an Irish writer and broadcaster.

== Biography ==
He was born on the island of Inishmore in County Galway. His parents were national school teachers, Pádraic Ó hEithir and Delia Ní Fhlaithearta. He attended their school in Kilronan. He received his secondary school education at Coláiste Éinde (St Enda's College) in Galway. He attended University College Galway for three years but left without obtaining a degree. Ó hEithir wrote in both Irish and English, and was highly regarded for the originality and liveliness of his journalism, especially his work in Irish.

After university, he spent a number of years working as an itinerant bookseller for Comhdháil Náisiúnta na Gaeilge. He served as an editor at Sáirséal agus Dill, the Irish language publishing house, and as Irish language editor for The Irish Press newspaper from 1957 to 1963; he also wrote a column for The Sunday Press. He was a regular columnist with the journal Comhar and also contributed a weekly column to The Irish Times. He also served as a staff journalist with RTÉ Television, working on the current affairs programmes Cúrsaí and Féach.

He married Catherine von Hildebrand in 1957 and they had five children; Ruairí, Máirín, Brian, Aindriú, and Rónán. Von Hildebrand was born in Paris, the daughter of Deirdre Mulcahy from Sligo and Franz von Hildebrand from Munich, son of the noted philosopher and theologian Dietrich von Hildebrand. He was a nephew of Aran Islands authors Liam O'Flaherty and Tom Maidhc O'Flaherty, the brothers of his mother, Delia. A biography of Ó hEithir has been written by Liam Mac Con Iomaire.

== Works ==
- Lig Sinn i gCathú ("Lead us into Temptation") (Sáirseál Ó Marcaigh, 1976)
- Willie the Plain Pint agus an Pápa (Cló Mercier, 1977)
- Over the Bar A Personal Relationship with the GAA (Ward River Press, 1984)
- Ciarán Fitzgerald agus Foireann Rugbaí na hÉireann (Coiscéim, 1985)
- The Begrudger's Guide to Irish Politics (Poolbeg Press, 1986)
- This is Ireland (O'Brien Press, 1987)
- Impressions of Galway (Appletree Press Ltd., 1987)
- Sionnach ar mo Dhuán (Sáirseál Ó Marcaigh, 1988)
- A Pocket History of Ireland (O'Brien Press, 1989)
- An Nollaig Thiar (Poolbeg Press, 1989)
- An Aran Reader (The Lilliput Press, 1991)
