= Robert de Faryngton =

English-born cleric, judge and statesman

Robert de Faryngton, or de Farrington (died 1405) was an English-born cleric, judge and statesman who became Master of the Rolls in Ireland and Lord High Treasurer of Ireland. As a cleric, he was notorious for pluralism, but he enjoyed the trust of three successive English monarchs.

== Family ==
Little is known of his early life. Of his family, we know that he had at least one brother Nicholas, on whose behalf he petitioned the King in 1398, and a cousin, Hugh de Faryngton, who accompanied him to Ireland in 1395 and became a judge there. It is unknown whether they had any connection to the prominent de Faryngton family of Evesham, Worcestershire. Hugh seems to have lived in Bedfordshire

== Early career ==
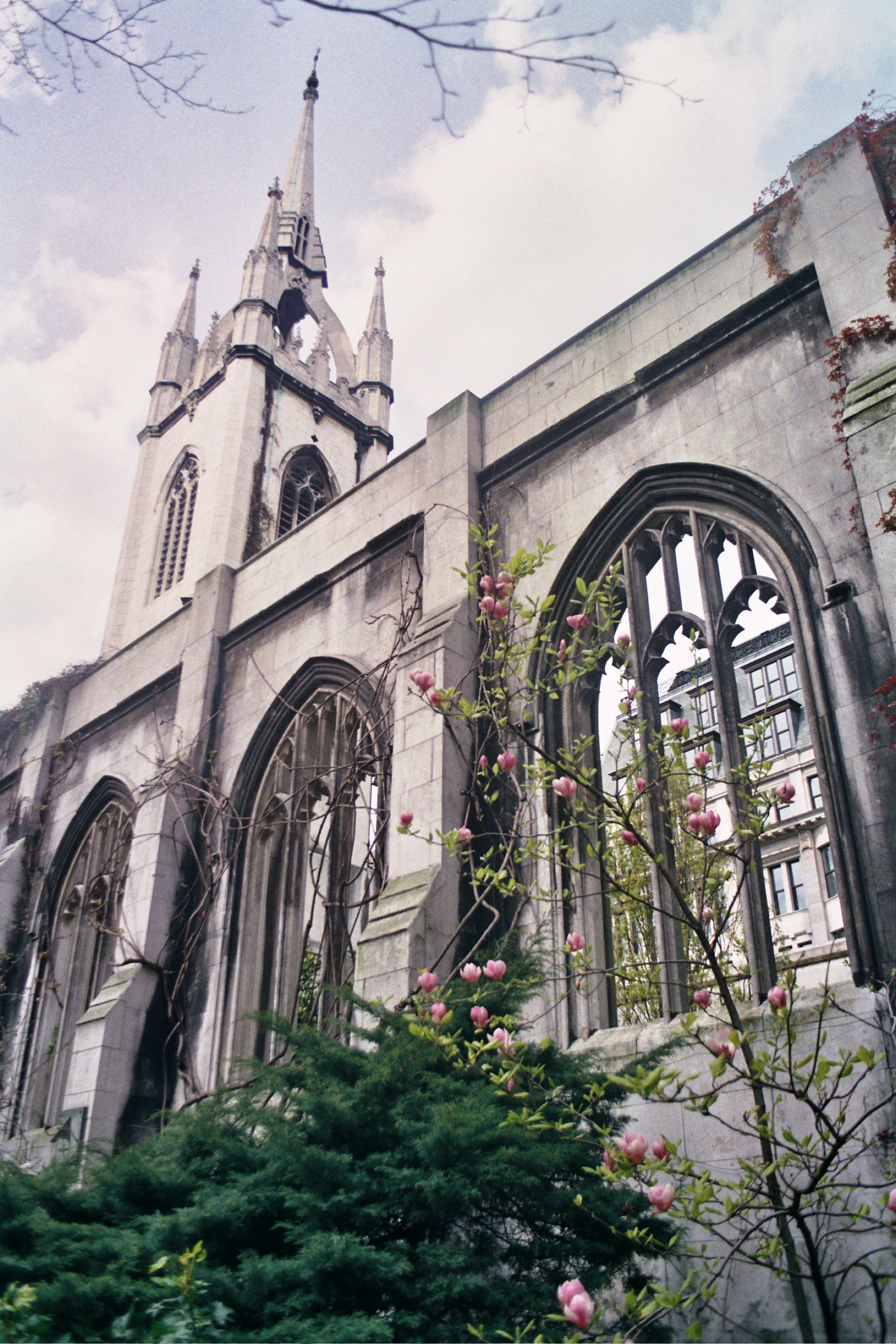
Ruins of St Dunstan-in-the-East, 2010

Robert is first heard of in 1370 as a clerk in the English Court of Chancery. He was in holy orders. Even in an age when such behaviour was commonplace among the priesthood, he was a notorious pluralist who acquired a remarkable number of benefices and prebends, which included Blackawton, Ludlow, Bishopstrow, Harlow, Laughton en le Morthen, St. Clether and St. Dunstan-in-the East. In 1375 he was awarded the prebendary of Aust, recently vacated by the philosopher John Wycliffe. On this occasion however, he clashed with the King's third son John of Gaunt, Wycliffe's most powerful protector and the dominant figure in the English government, who persuaded King Edward III that Wycliffe was still entitled to the prebend. The grant to de Faryngton was cancelled: he was compensated with another prebendary in Lincoln, with which, it has been said, he was content, "at least in the short term".

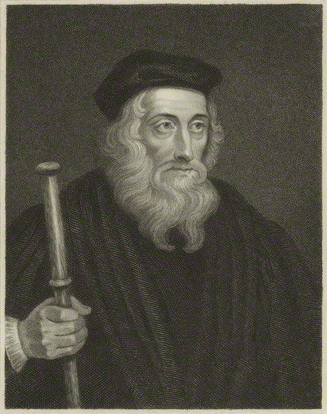
John Wycliffe, with whom de Faryngton disputed the right to a prebend

== Career in Ireland ==
Despite his reputation for acquisitiveness, he was highly regarded as an administrator. In 1395 he was sent to Ireland as Master of the Rolls in Ireland. His tenure as a judge was brief, but it allowed him to gain the customary right of the Master of the Rolls to be appointed a prebend of St. Patrick's Cathedral, Dublin, and he was also given another prebend at Lusk. It is interesting that the King in 1395 gave a gift to the Chapter of St. Patrick's "on account of their poverty". Robert, on the King's instructions, also confirmed the charter for the Priory of All Hallows outside Dublin.

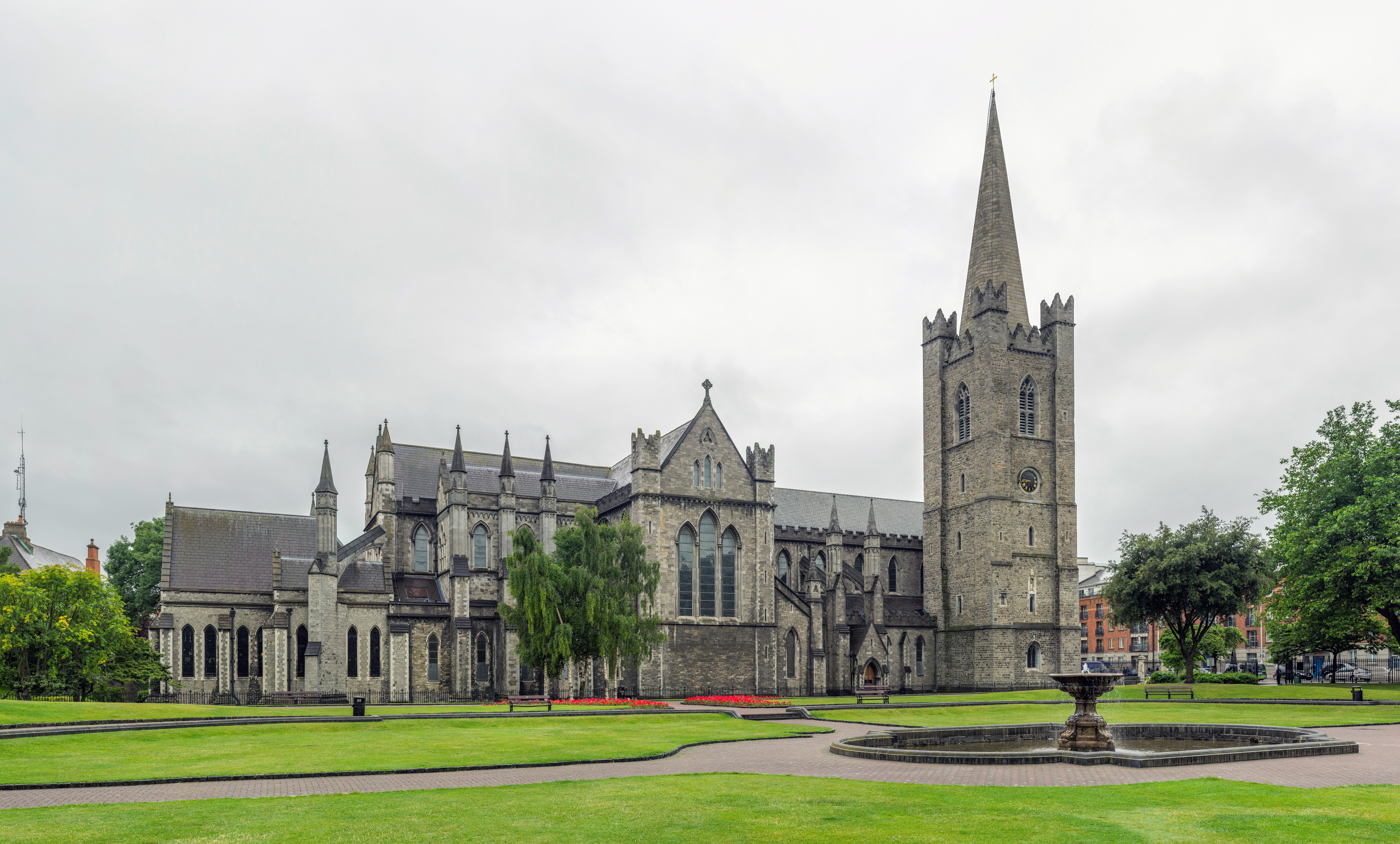
St Patrick's Cathedral, Dublin

In 1397, when he appears to have been with the Royal Court at Westminster, he was described once again as a "King's clerk", though by now a very senior one. The Crown authorised a payment to Robert, to be shared with Sir Jenico d'Artois (a Gascon-born knight who was high in the Crown service in Ireland), for the marriages of the three daughters of the late Sir Robert Ufford (sometimes styled Lord Clavering) and his widow Eleanor Felton, daughter of Sir Thomas Felton and Joan de Wakefare, who were royal wards. Of the three girls, Sybilla became a nun, but suitable husbands of the Bowett family were found for her sisters, Joan and Ela.

== Lord Treasurer of Ireland ==
In 1398 King Richard II appointed de Faryngton Lord High Treasurer of Ireland. In the same year Robert petitioned the King that his brother Nicholas de Faryngton should not be forced to take up any public office against his will, and the King granted the petition in person, perhaps an indication of the high regard in which Robert was held by the Crown. Further evidence of his good standing at Court is his second successful petition, also dating from 1398, to be granted a tun, or two pipes, of Gascony wine every Christmas for the rest of his life. In the same year he petitioned successfully for the prebend of Laughton in Morthen, Yorkshire.

Richard II was deposed in the following year, but the new King Henry IV, who probably knew de Faryngton personally, re-appointed him as Lord Treasurer of Ireland. It was Faryngton himself who evidently asked to be relieved of his duties: he stepped down as Treasurer in May 1400 and returned to England. He resumed his old position in the Chancery and was promoted to the rank of "clerk of the first degree". He died in 1405.

== Legacy ==
His cousin Hugh de Faryngton, a clerk in the service of the Crown and former treasurer of Salisbury Cathedral, is first heard of in 1281 when he brought a lawsuit at Westminster against Joanna Pycard, widow of William Pycard, for possession of the Manor of Goldington, Bedfordshire. The case was resolved amicably: Joanna acknowledged Hugh's right, and he paid her £100 in compensation.

Hugh accompanied Robert to Ireland and became a Baron of the Court of Exchequer (Ireland) in 1399. In the following year he was sitting on a judicial commission with Richard Rede, the Chief Baron of the Irish Exchequer.

It is unclear whether Philip Faryngton, an official in the Court of Chancery (Ireland) in the 1420s, was a relative of Robert and Hugh. Philip was the Court "spigurnal", i.e. the official who affixed the royal seal to the writs. His salary was only twopence a day, although in 1426 he was paid 38 shillings in arrears.
