= Maidhc Ó Flaithearta =

Maidhc Ó Flaithearta was a member of the Irish National Land League and father of Liam O'Flaherty, fl. 1882.

== Biography ==
Giving his pedigree as Maidhc Mhicil Phádraic Bheartlaiméid Bhriain Bheartlaiméid, Ó Flaithearta was descended from Mícheál Ó Flaithearta, the first inhabitant of the village of Gort na gCapall, Inishmore. He was leader of the village, and eloped with sixteen-year-old Maggie Ganly, daughter of Thomas Ganly of Mainistir. Her son, Liam, related the story of the elopement, as told by Maggie:

She told it as one tells a fairy-tale to amuse a child, how her handsome young lover came by night on horseback to her father's house and abducted her, at the very moment when another suitor from the mainland was there asking for her hand; how she was married at dawn in the chapel and went off to live in an old deserted house in our village, penniless and unforgiven by her parents. Her fairy-tale ended with her marriage. After that, her life was a tale of hardship and misery, and endless struggle to find food for her many children.

Maidhc was imprisoned a number of times on suspection of shooting a bailiff, during the Irish Land War. He and his family, including their first son, Tom Maidhc O'Flaherty, still a child, narrowly escaped eviction. Tom later remarked of Maidhc:

He had lived a rather eventful life and an eviction was only another incident. He was a Fenian and a Land Leaguer, and most of the time he forgot he was the father of a large young family. He was used to police attentions and accustomed to jails. ... My mother always expressed the belief that if my father thought of his own affairs a little more and about those of the community a little less, the world would be a much better place to live in. She did not understand that she had fallen in love with and married an incurable rebel, and not an ordinary husband. And rebels are easier to fall in love with than to live with.
