= Lig Sinn i gCathú =

1976 novel by Breandán Ó hEithir

- Paperback cover showing An tSráid Árd, Cathair Na Gaillimhe / City Of Galway (Sáirséal - Ó Márcaigh Teoranta 1982)
- Author: Breandán Ó hEithir
- Translator: Ó hEithir
- Language: Irish
- Subject: University
- Genre: Novel
- Set in: Baile an Chaisil, a thinly disguised city of Galway
- Publisher: Sáirséal agus Dill
- Publication date: 1976
- Publication place: Ireland
- English publication date: 1978
- Media type: Print book
- Pages: 205 pp (Sáirséal - Ó Márcaigh Teoranta 1982)
- ISBN: 0902563580 (1st Irish ed); ISBN 0710000308 (1st English ed, Routledge & Kegan Paul)

Lig Sinn i gCathú (Irish: Lead Us Into Temptation) is a novel by the Irish writer Breandán Ó hEithir.

== Title ==
Its title refers to the Lord's Prayer (or "Our Father"):

forgive us our trespasses,
as we forgive those who trespass against us,
and lead us not into temptation,
but deliver us from evil.

== Plot ==
The story is set in the university town of Baile an Chaisil, a thinly disguised city of Galway, in 1949, the year Ireland declared itself a republic and withdrew from the Commonwealth of Nations. Máirtín Ó Mealóid, a pub-crawling university student, and his disreputable friends are too busy drinking and lusting after girls to pay much attention to this significant political development. The story takes place over four days from Thursday 14 April to Monday 18 April.

== Publication ==
The novel was written and published in Irish, then translated into English and German and was adapted for the stage in 2004. An extract from the book was formerly on the curriculum of Honours Level Irish in the Leaving Certificate secondary school examination. It was the first Irish-language book ever to top Ireland's hardback best-seller list.

The book was launched at Kennys, and the event aired live for an hour and a half on RTÉ Radio 1.
