= The Sniper (story) =

Short story by Liam O'Flaherty

The Sniper is a short story written by the Irish writer Liam O'Flaherty. Set during the early weeks of the Irish Civil War, during the Battle of Dublin, it is O'Flaherty's first published work of fiction. It was published in a small London-based socialist weekly, The New Leader (12 January 1923) while the war that it depicted was still ongoing. The favorable notice that it generated helped to get other works by O'Flaherty published, and started his career.

The short story is widely read today in secondary schools of many English-speaking countries because it is easy to read, it is brief and it has a notable surprise ending.

== Plot ==
There is heavy fighting taking place in Dublin, Ireland. A Republican sniper is sitting on a rooftop, eating a sandwich and drinking a bottle of whiskey. Despite knowing that it is dangerous, he decides to smoke a cigarette; he is immediately shot at. An armored car of the Irish Free State forces arrives, and an old woman steps out of the darkness and points out the sniper's position to the soldier in the car. The sniper shoots both the woman and the man in the car. He is then shot in the right arm by an enemy Free State sniper.

The sniper applies a dressing though he is in great pain, and stays in the same position for some time. He decides to escape from the roof before morning. However, the enemy sniper blocked his escape. He is no longer able to hold his rifle and slyly tricks the enemy sniper into shooting his cap, which he places over the rifle. He lets the cap fall into the street, drops his rifle, and lets his left hand hang over the edge of the roof, which gives the impression that he has been shot dead.

The enemy sniper then stands up clearly, only to be shot instantly by the Republican sniper with a revolver. The dying man falls over the roof and hits the ground. Weakened and disgusted, the protagonist moves down to the street because he is curious to find out whom he had killed.

The sniper darts across the street under machine-gun fire. He turns over the dead body, only to realize that the dead man was his brother.

== Sources ==
- A Study Guide for Liam O'Flaherty's "The Sniper". Gale (Cengage Learning), ISBN 9781410358325 ..(online at encyclopedia.com)
- Elsa Baíz de Gelpí: meet the short story. La editorial (Universidad de Puerto Rico, 1973, ISBN 9780847727599, pp. 53–64
