= The Informer (1929 film) =

1929 film directed by Arthur Robison

- Directed by: Arthur Robison
- Written by: Liam O'Flaherty (novel); Benn W. Levy; Rolf E. Vanloo
- Starring: Lya De Putti; Lars Hanson; Warwick Ward; Carl Harbord
- Cinematography: Werner Brandes; Theodor Sparkuhl
- Edited by: Emile de Ruelle
- Music by: Hubert Bath; Harry Stafford
- Production company: British International Pictures
- Distributed by: Wardour Films
- Release date: 17 October 1929
- Running time: 83 minutes
- Country: United Kingdom
- Languages: Sound (Part-Talkie); English Intertitles

The silent (left) and sound (right) versions of The Informer

The Informer is a 1929 British sound part-talkie drama film directed by Arthur Robison and starring Lya De Putti, Lars Hanson, Warwick Ward and Carl Harbord. The picture was based on the 1925 novel The Informer by Liam O'Flaherty. In the film, a man betrays his best friend, a member of the outlawed Irish Republican Army, to the authorities and is then pursued by the other members of the organisation. The later better-known adaptation The Informer (1935) was directed by John Ford.

== Cast ==
- Lya De Putti as Katie Fox
- Lars Hanson as Gypo Nolan
- Warwick Ward as Dan Gallagher
- Carl Harbord as Francis McPhilip
- Dennis Wyndham as Murphy
- Janice Adair as Bessie
- Daisy Campbell as Mrs McPhillip
- Craighall Sherry as Mulholland
- Ray Milland as Sharpshooter
- Ellen Pollock as Prostitute
- Johnny Butt as Publican

== Production ==
The film was made at Elstree Studios by British International Pictures as the sound revolution was taking place. The film was made with a soundtrack, sound effects and talking scenes. A fully silent version was also released. Robison was one of a number of Germans engaged to work in the British Film Industry following the Film Act of 1927, which stimulated the British film industry by requiring exhibitors to show a minimum percentage of British films.
