= 1923 FAI Cup final =

Shelbourne	Alton United
League of Ireland	Fall's League
0	1
- Date: 17 March 1923
- Venue: Dalymount Park, Dublin
- Attendance: 14,000

The 1923 FAI Cup final was contested by League of Ireland side Shelbourne of Dublin and Alton United of Belfast's Fall's League on 17 March at Dalymount Park, Dublin.

== Matchday summary ==
Given the turbulent political situation in Dublin at the time, Alton United were given an armed escort from Amiens Street Station by the IRA. The Dubliners who were red hot favourites to lift the trophy in only its second year, played well below par and the visitors won it through the only goal.

Alton's players were presented with their medals after the game, but the Football Association of Ireland refused them permission to take the trophy back to Belfast with them due to the tense political situation there. Shortly after Alton affiliated to the Irish Football Association and therefore never defended the trophy the following season.

== Match details ==
Shelbourne 0-1 Alton United

Scorer:McSherry

Shelbourne line-up:Paddy Walsh, Paddy Kavanagh, James Connolly, Dan Delaney, Val Harris, Mick Foley, Eddie Brierley, Stephen Doyle, Jimmy Harvey, Ralph Ardiff, Sammy Wilson

Alton United line-up: Jimmy Maginnis, Edward McNeill, Hugh Bell, Paddy Devlin, Michael Brennan, Bobby Loughran, Andy McSherry, Billy Duffy, Sammy Ward, Jack Russell, Hugh McCann

Attendance:14,000

Gate receipts:£694/11/0

== Road to Dalymount Park ==
=== Shelbourne ===
Home teams listed first.

Round 1: Shelbourne 9-0 Bray Unknowns

Round 2: St. James's Gate 1-2 Shelbourne

Semi-final: Shelbourne 2-0 Jacobs

=== Alton United ===
Home teams listed first.

Round 1: Alton United 4-0 Midland Athletic Abandoned 2nd half:bad light

Re-fixture: Alton United 5-0 Midland Athletic

Round 2: Shelbourne United 1-1 Alton United

Replay: Alton United 2-0 Shelbourne United

Semi-final: Alton United 4-2 Fordsons
