= Sampson D'Artois =

French-born officeholder

Sampson d'Artois (also called Dartas or Dartasso) (born after 1350, died after 1430) was a French-born officeholder in fifteenth-century Ireland.

The d'Artois family were originally from Gascony. Sampson came to Ireland about 1490 in the service of the English Crown. The most notable contemporary member of the d'Artois family was Sir Jenico d'Artois the elder (born c.1350, died 1426) who was a trusted military commander in the service of three successive kings of England.

That Sampson was a close relative, and most likely a brother, of Jenico is confirmed by Jenico's will, in which he appointed his widow Elizabeth, one Nicholas Bayley and Sampson as his co-executors. An order of the Privy Council of 1426 released them from any debts which they had incurred as executors.

Sampson was already a trusted Crown official by 1414, when he received several grants of land, including Rathdaniel in County Louth, and others whose location is impossible to determine, due to the archaic spelling. He was appointed Chancellor of the Exchequer of Ireland in 1424; he appointed John Blaketoun his deputy. Blaketoun became Chancellor of the Exchequer in 1431 when Sampson presumably either died or retired.
