= Over the Bar =

1991 memoir by Breandán Ó hEithir

Over the Bar: A Personal Relationship with the GAA
- Author: Breandán Ó hEithir
- Language: English
- Genre: Autobiography
- Publisher: Poolbeg Press
- Publication date: 1991
- Publication place: Ireland
- Pages: 216
- ISBN: 9781853711565

Over the Bar: A Personal Relationship with the GAA is a memoir by the Irish writer Breandán Ó hEithir, describing his early life on Inishmore, his education at University College, Galway (where he subsequently dropped out) and his long-time involvement with the Gaelic Athletic Association.
