= Famine (O'Flaherty novel) =

1937 novel by Liam O'Flaherty

First US edition (publ. The Literary Guild)

Famine is a novel by Irish writer Liam O'Flaherty published in 1937. Set in the fictionally named Black Valley in the west of Ireland (there is an actual Black Valley in County Kerry) during the Great Famine of the 1840s, the novel tells the story of three generations of the Kilmartin family. The novel is critical of the constitutional politics of Daniel O'Connell, which are depicted as laying the oppressed Irish of the 19th century open to the famine that would destroy their society.

In a review for the Irish Times, author John Broderick said of one of the novel's characters: "Mary Kilmartin (the heroine) has been singled out by two generations of critics as one of the great creations of modern literature. And so she is."

In Great Hatred, Little Room: The Irish Historical Novel, James Cahalan wrote: The novel is interspersed with sardonic socialist polemics, and contains an extreme representation of the landlord’s agent, Chadwick, who seduces and ruins Ellie Gleeson and exclaims against the peasants, "I’m going to root them out like a nest of rats."

O'Flaherty dedicated the book to John Ford, in thanks and honor of his 1935 film adaptation of O'Flaherty's novel, The Informer.

== See also ==
- Land, a 2026 novel by Maggie O’Farrell that centers on the Irish Potato Famine.

== Character list ==
- Brian Kilmartin - Aged 71 at novel's start, he is a tenant farmer with land in the Black Valley. He was a migratory worker as a young man until he acquired his land from Thomsy Hynes.
- Martin Kilmartin - Aged 25 at novel's start, he is Brian's oldest surviving son.
- Mary Gleeson - Aged 19 at the novel's start, she is the wife of Martin. A beautiful woman with shining, black hair, she is the daughter of a weaver named Barney Gleeson. It is mentioned in the book that the women at that time kept their maiden name after marriage.
- Thomsy Hynes - In his early 50s at the novel's start, he is the brother-in-law of Brian Kilmartin. At the age of eight, on his parents' deaths he had surrendered his land to Brian Kilmartin, his sister Maggie's husband. He has lived with the Kilmartins since then.
- Maggie Hynes - Brian's wife and Thomsy's sister.
- Michael Kilmartin - Brian's other surviving son, he is sick at the beginning of the novel.
