= Margaret Barrington =

Irish writer and journalist (1896–1982)

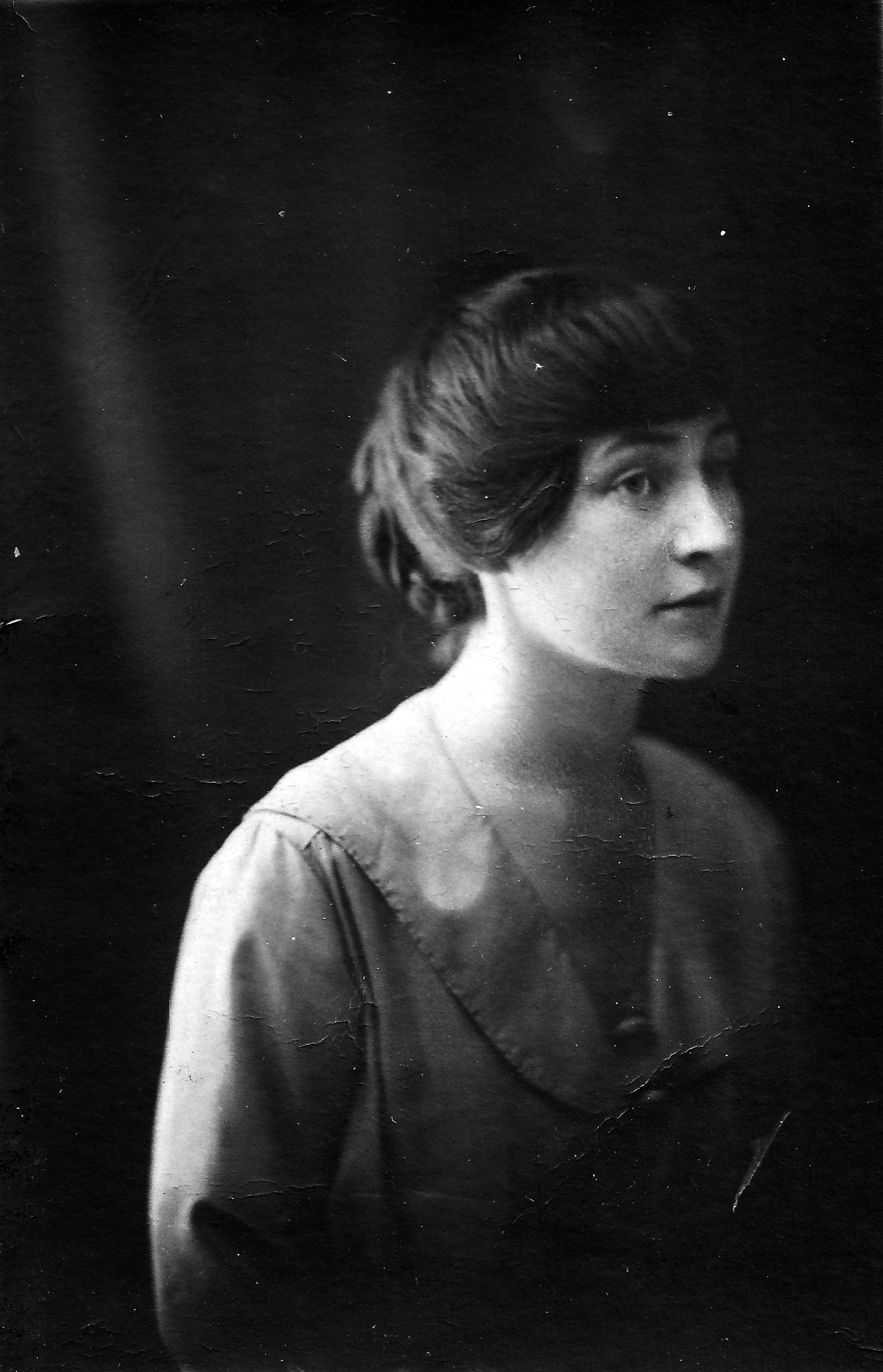
- Barrington in the early 1920s
- Born: 10 May 1896; Malin, County Donegal
- Died: 8 March 1982 (aged 85); Kinsale, County Cork
- Spouses: Edmund Curtis, Liam O'Flaherty

Margaret Barrington (10 May 1896 – 8 March 1982) was an Irish writer and journalist.

== Early life and education ==
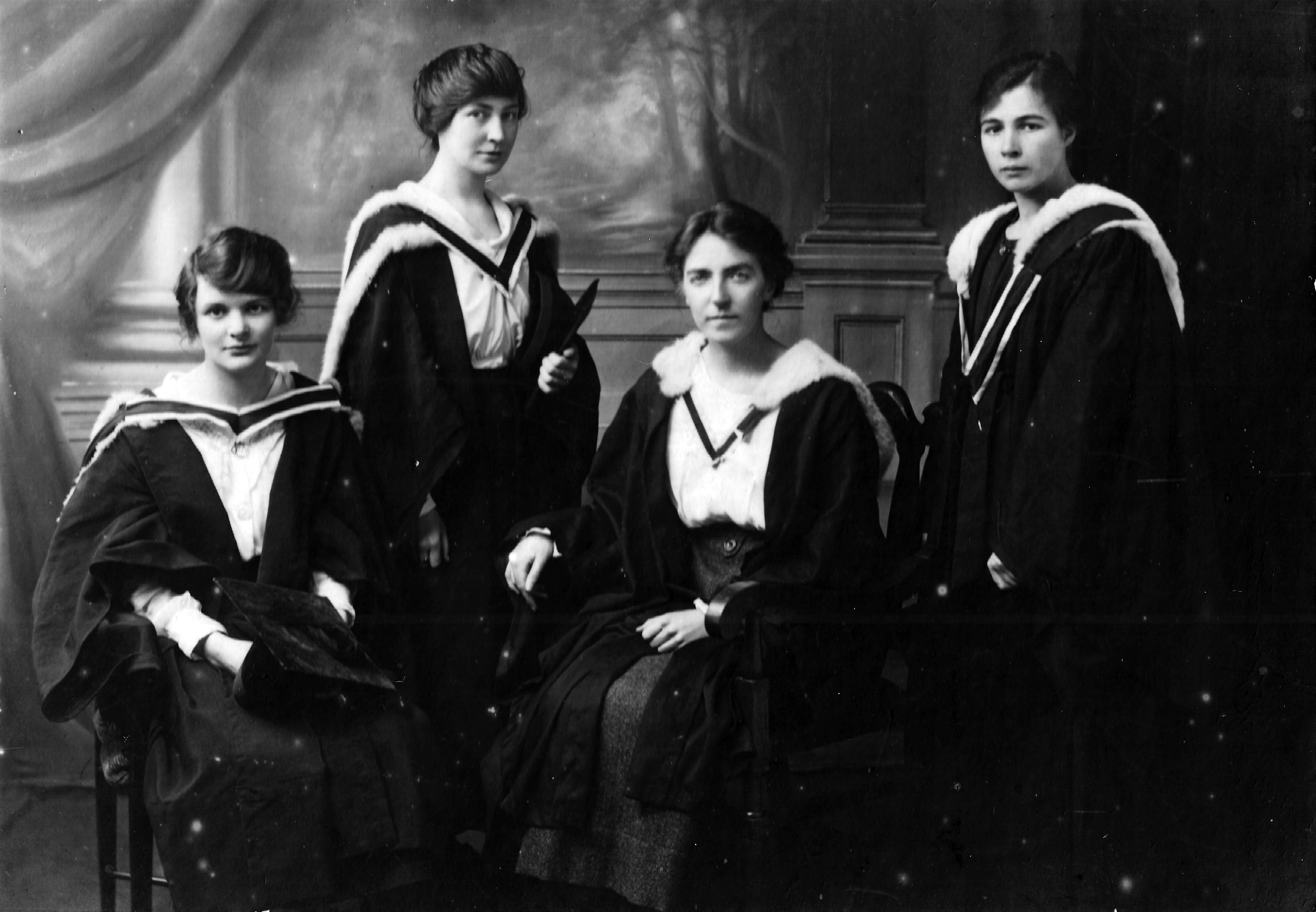
Barrington at her TCD graduation, 1918

Margaret Barrington was born in Malin, County Donegal on 10 May 1896. Her parents were Richard Barrington, RIC sergeant, and Charlotte Barrington (née Scott), one of their three daughters. She spent much of her childhood living with her maternal grandfather due to her mother's poor health. She later moved to Dungannon, County Tyrone with her parents. She attended the Royal School, Dungannon, then Alexandra College, Dublin, and then in Normandy. She went on to enter Trinity College Dublin (TCD), graduating with a BA in modern literature with a gold medal in 1918. In 1922 she married the historian Edmund Curtis. Following this she taught German and French at a number of Dublin schools.

== Writing career ==
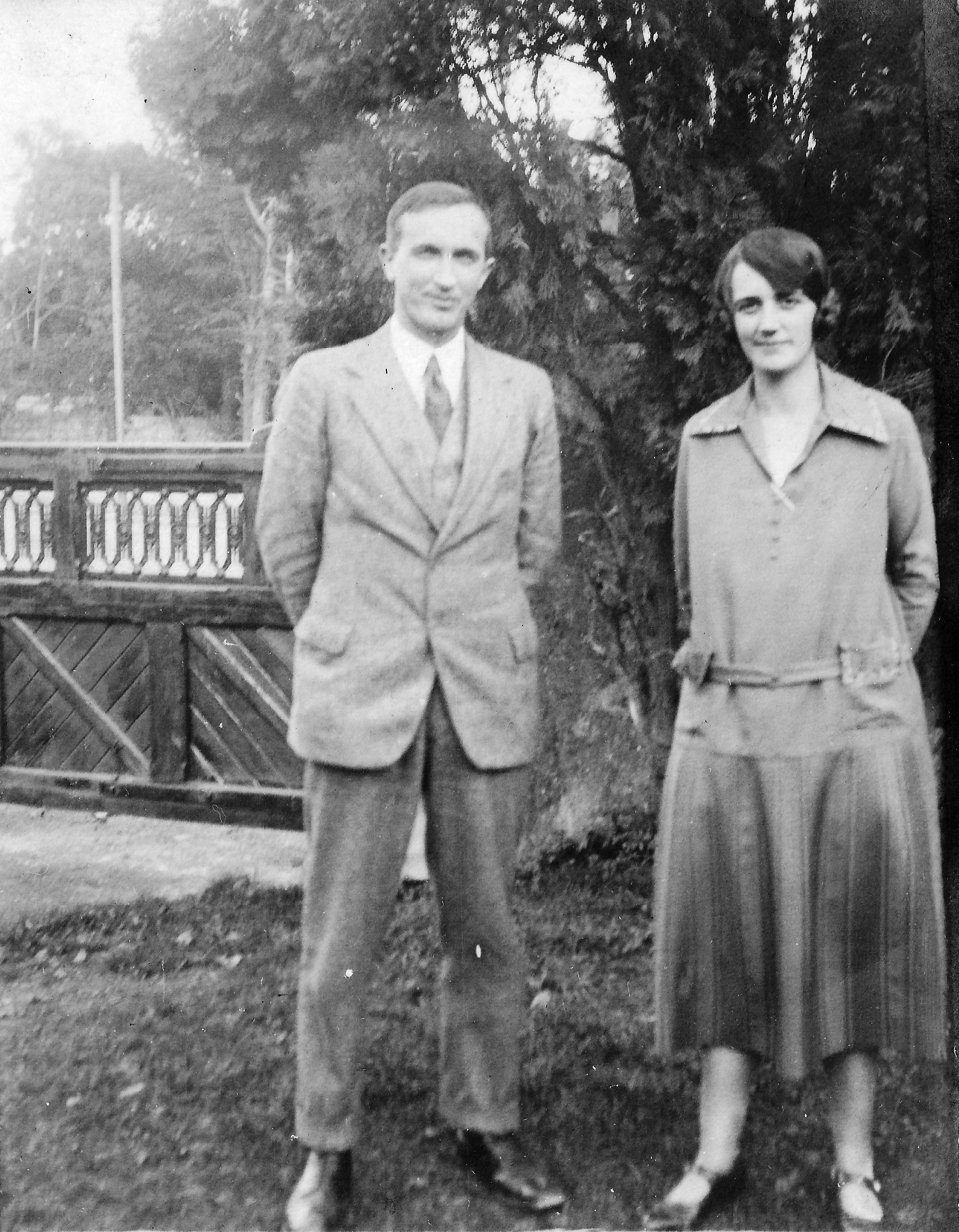
Barrington with her second husband, Liam O'Flaherty

Barrington's first published work was an article on the treatment of women students in TCD's College Miscellany of 5 June 1918. As she continued to publish, she regularly attended George William Russell's gatherings, meeting such figures as W. B. Yeats and James Stephens. Liam O'Flaherty described her as "the little marvel of the literary circle here" after he was introduced to her in early 1924. It appears that she and O'Flaherty began an affair soon after, resulting in Barrington leaving her husband by July 1924 and living with O'Flaherty in England. In August 1924, she contributed a short story entitled Colour to Francis Stuart's journal To-morrow, which tackled sexual and racial taboos.

Upon her return to Ireland with O'Flaherty in December 1924, they received a cold reception from their old friends, suffering financially for a time. Once Barrington divorced Curtis, she married O'Flaherty in London in March 1926. Their only child, Pegeen, was born there soon after. O'Flaherty actively encouraged her to write during this time, but for the eight years they were married Barrington wrote very little. She blamed this lack of writing on the "difficulties" of married life. Their marriage was failing by the late 1920s, with, for example, Barrington having to write to their friend, A. D. Peters, to enquire if he knew where O'Flaherty was. In 1932 they separated and Barrington settled in London. The following years were the most productive of her life, when she translated, wrote, organised support of republicans in the Spanish Civil War, and assisted refugees from Nazi Germany. She was a supporter of the British Labour Party, taking on the women's column of the left-wing paper Tribune in November 1938.

Upon the outbreak of World War II, Barrington returned to Ireland, living in Leap, County Cork with friends Ewart Milne and Stella Jackson. From 1941 to 1952 she was a regular contributor to The Bell with letters, reviews, essays and short stories. She lived in Castletownsend from 1947 to 1953, then settled in Kinsale.

== Later life and legacy ==
The later years of Barrington's life were lived in relative obscurity. She died in a Kinsale nursing home on 8 March 1982, and is buried locally. David's daughter Tamar, a collection of her short stories was published posthumously in 1982. At least three of her novels remain unpublished. Her short story, Village Without Men, from 1982 was included in the anthology The Glass Shore: Short Stories by Women Writers from the North of Ireland. Her story Men are Never God's Creatures was included in the anthology The Art of the Glimpse: 100 Irish Short Stories.
