= The Informer (1935 film) =

1935 film by John Ford

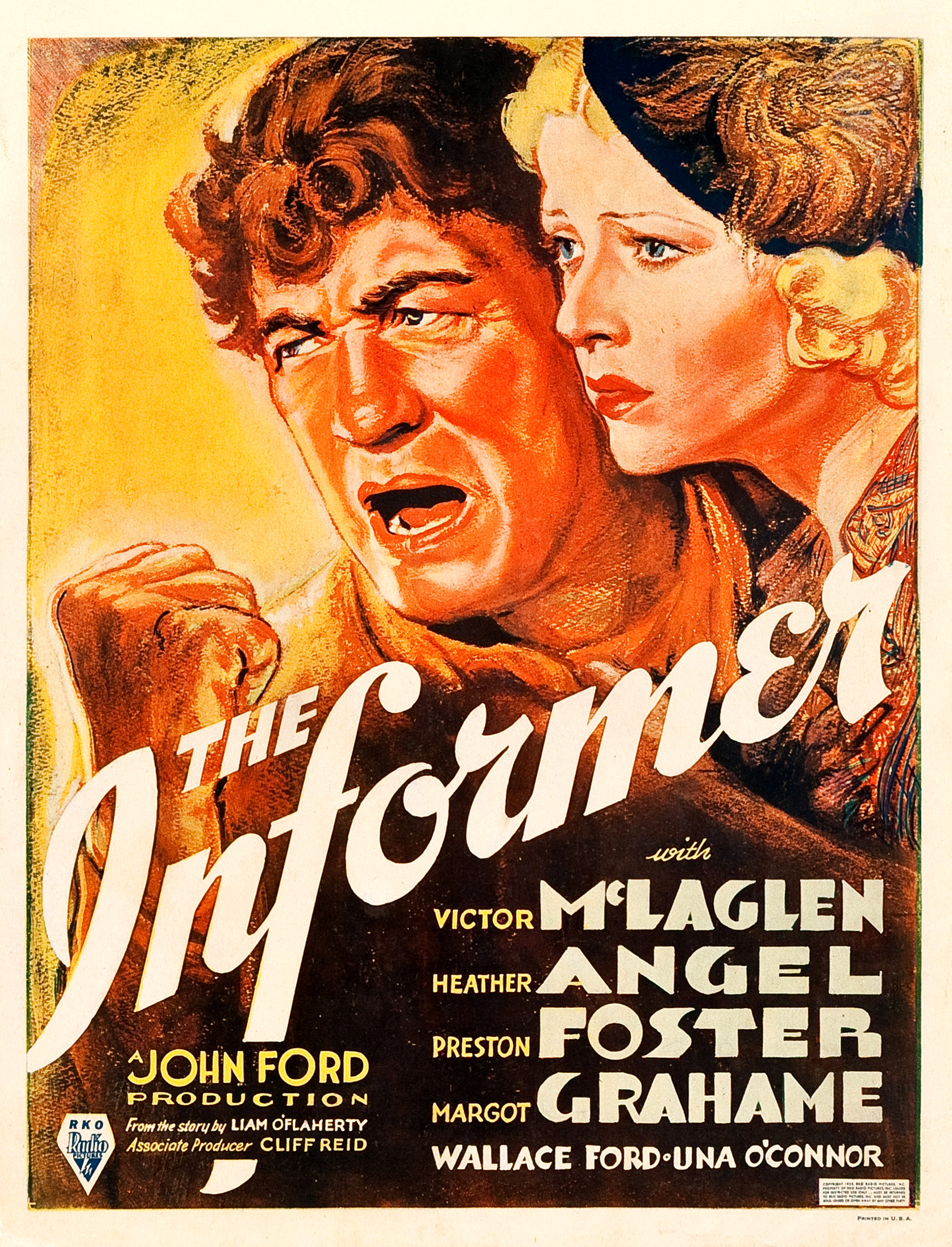
- Theatrical release poster
- Directed by: John Ford
- Screenplay by: Dudley Nichols
- Based on: The Informer; 1925 novel by Liam O'Flaherty
- Produced by: John Ford
- Starring: Victor McLaglen; Heather Angel; Preston Foster; Margot Grahame; Wallace Ford; Una O'Connor
- Cinematography: Joseph H. August
- Edited by: George Hively
- Music by: Max Steiner
- Production company: RKO Radio Pictures
- Distributed by: RKO Radio Pictures
- Release date: May 9, 1935
- Running time: 91 minutes
- Country: United States
- Language: English
- Budget: $243,000
- Box office: $950,000

The Informer is a 1935 American drama thriller film directed and produced by John Ford, adapted by Dudley Nichols from the 1925 novel of the same title by Irish novelist Liam O'Flaherty. Set in 1922, the plot concerns the underside of the Irish War of Independence and centers on a disgraced Republican man, played by Victor McLaglen, who anonymously informs on his former comrades and spirals into guilt as his treachery becomes known. Heather Angel, Preston Foster, Margot Grahame, Wallace Ford, Una O'Connor and J. M. Kerrigan co-star. The novel had previously been adapted for a British film of the same name in 1929.

Along with Mutiny on the Bounty, The Informer was a big contender at the 8th Academy Awards, competing directly in all six categories they were nominated for (though Mutiny got eight nominations in total, given its three Best Actor nominations). The Informer won four Oscars: Best Director for Ford, Best Actor for McLaglen, Best Writing Screenplay for Nichols, and Best Score for Max Steiner.

In 2018, the film was selected for preservation in the United States National Film Registry by the Library of Congress as being "culturally, historically, or aesthetically significant."

== Plot ==
In Dublin in 1922, Gypo Nolan has been kicked out of the outlaw Irish Republican Army (IRA) for not killing a Black and Tan who killed an IRA man. He becomes angry when he sees his streetwalker girlfriend Katie Madden trying to pick up a customer. After he throws the man into the street, Katie laments that she does not have £10 for passage to America to start afresh.

Gypo later runs into his friend and IRA comrade Frankie McPhillip, a fugitive with a £20 bounty on his head. Frankie, tired of hiding for six months, is on his way home to visit his mother and sister Mary under cover of the foggy night. The slow-witted Gypo decides to turn informer for the £20 reward, enough for passage to America for the both of them. The Black and Tans find Frankie at his house, and Frankie is killed in the ensuing gunfight. The British contemptuously give Gypo his blood money and let him go.

Gypo subsequently buys a bottle of whiskey and tells Katie that he obtained money by beating up an American sailor. He goes to Frankie's wake, and acts suspiciously when coins fall out of his pocket. The men there tell him that they do not suspect Gypo of informing, but he then meets with several of his former IRA comrades, who wonder who informed on Frankie. Gypo claims it was a man named Mulligan. Though Gypo is drunk and talking nonsense, the others begin to suspect him but do not have enough evidence as yet. Gypo leaves and gives out £1 notes to a blind man and some bar patrons, but people wonder why he had such a sudden influx of cash. Meanwhile, Mary tells the IRA that the only person Frankie talked to that day was Gypo, and the men decide to hold an inquest into the death.

Gypo goes to an upper-class party to look for Katie, but gets drunk and buys rounds of drinks. Gypo is then taken away by his former IRA comrades when they figure out he was likely the informant. He is taken to a kangaroo court, where Mulligan is questioned and is accused once again by Gypo. However, the comrades do not believe Gypo, and give him a detailed accounting of where he spent his entire £20 reward. Gypo then confesses to ratting out Frankie.

Gypo is locked up, but before he can be killed, he escapes through a hole in the ceiling. He runs to Katie's apartment, where he tells her that he informed on Frankie. Katie goes to see the commissioner who presided over the trial, Dan Gallagher, to beg him to leave Gypo alone. The rigid Gallagher says he cannot do anything, and Gypo might turn in the entire organization to the police if he is allowed to live. Other IRA members, having overheard Katie, go to her apartment and shoot Gypo, much to Katie's horror as she hears the shots. Gypo wanders into a church where Frankie's mother is praying and begs forgiveness as he confesses to her. She does forgive him, telling him that he did not know what he was doing, and the absolved Gypo dies content on the floor of the church after calling out to Frankie with joy.

== Cast ==
- Victor McLaglen as "Gypo" Nolan
- Heather Angel as Mary McPhillip
- Preston Foster as Dan Gallagher
- Margot Grahame as Katie Madden
- Wallace Ford as Frankie McPhillip
- Una O'Connor as Mrs McPhillip
- J. M. Kerrigan as Terry
- Joseph Sauers as Bartly Mulholland
- Neil Fitzgerald as Tommy Connor
- Donald Meek as Peter Mulligan
- D'Arcy Corrigan as The Blind Man
- Leo McCabe as Donahue
- Gaylord Pendleton as Dennis Daley
- Francis Ford as "Judge" Flynn
- May Boley as Madame Betty
- Grizelda Harvey as The Lady
- Dennis O'Dea as Street singer
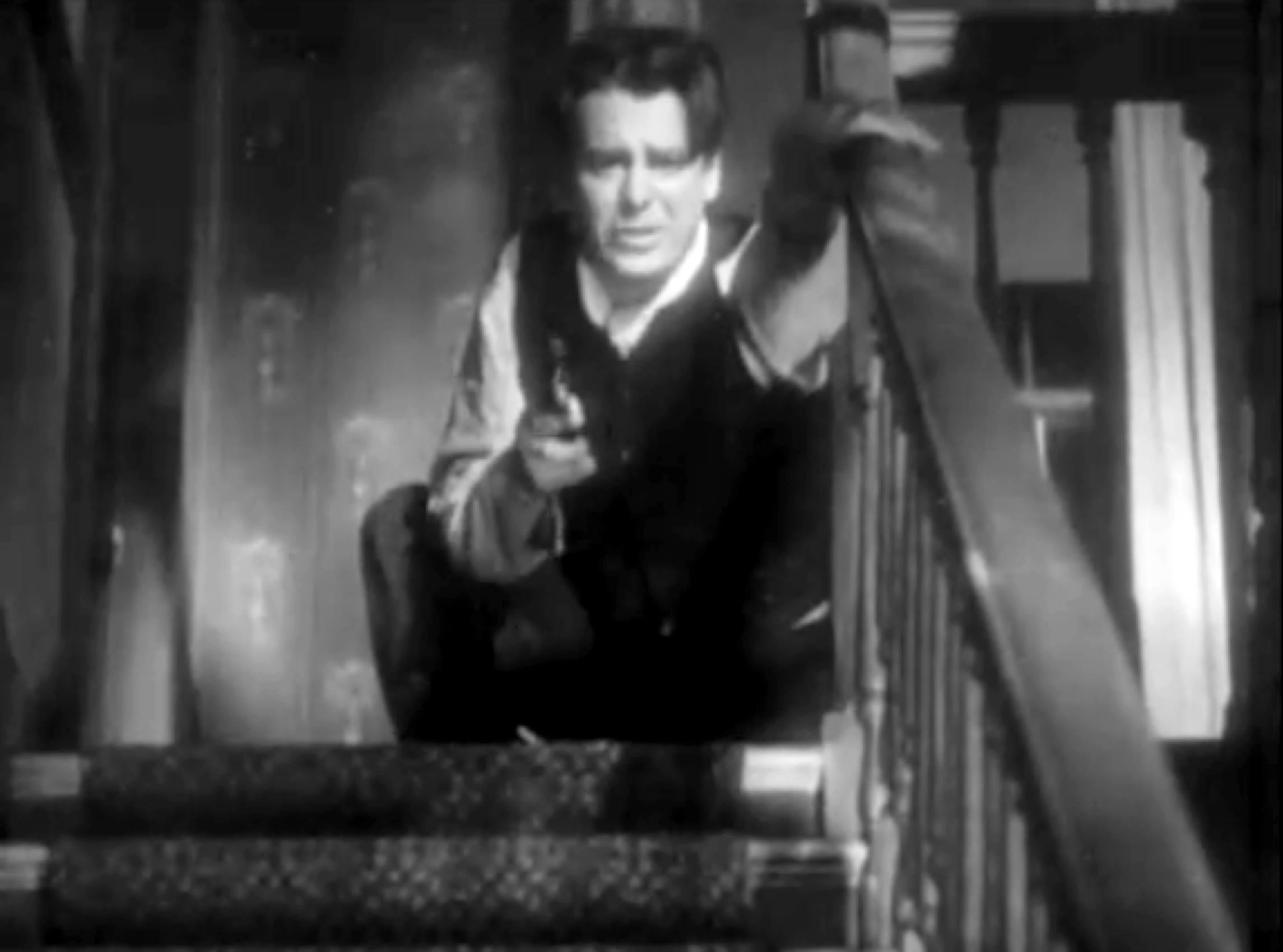
Wallace Ford as Frankie McPhillip in The Informer

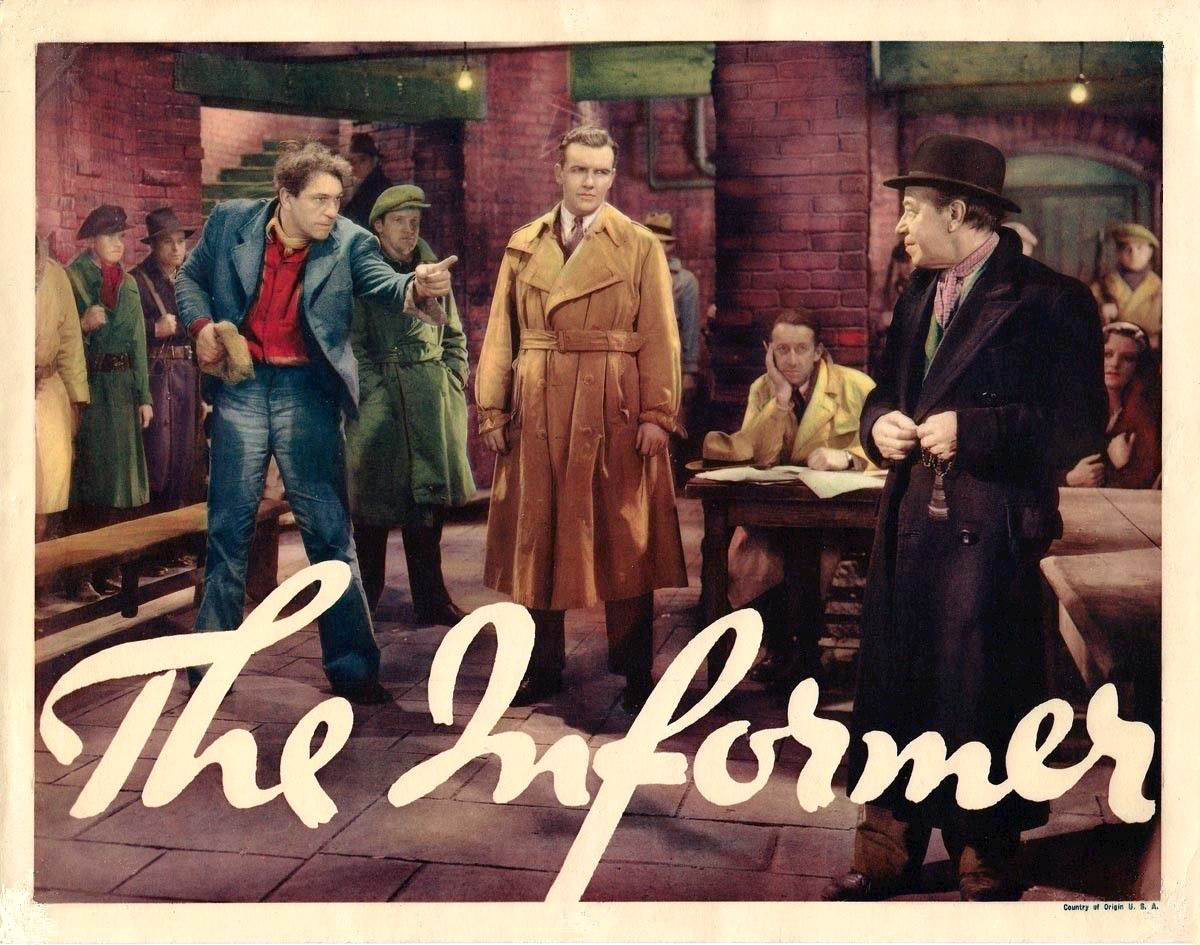
Lobby card for The Informer featuring Victor McLaglen, Preston Foster and Donald Meek

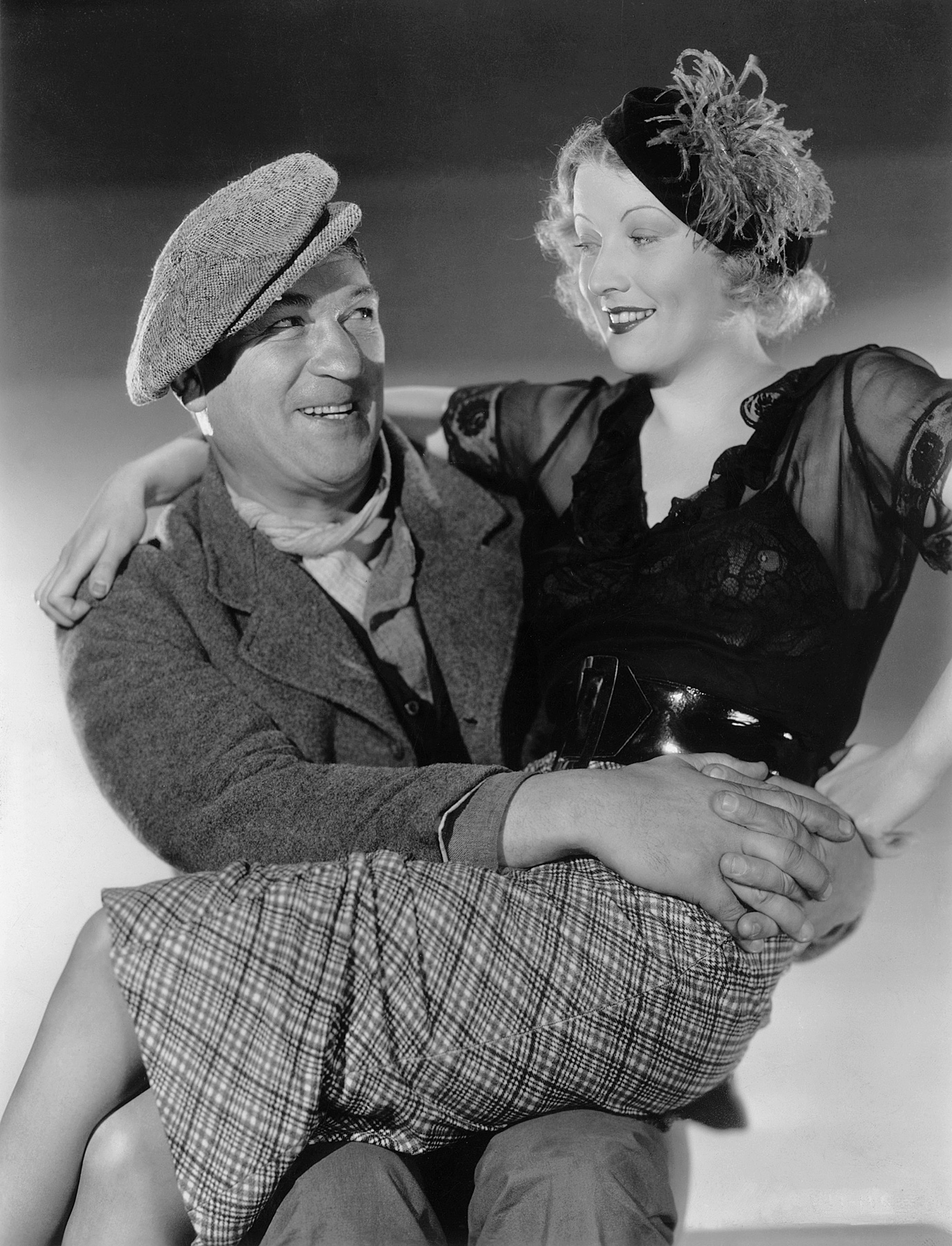
McLaglen as "Gypo" Nolan and Grahame as Katie Madden

== Political context and censorship ==
The film did not mention the IRA by name and, like Carol Reed's Odd Man Out (1947), only "casually touched on the underlying conflict." Writing in The IRA in Film and Television: A History, author Mark Connelly observes that both films share a common "jaundiced view of Irish nationalism and its adherents." The IRA was portrayed as little more than a criminal gang "whose principal activities were robbery, murder and vigilante reprisals." Gypo Nolan was largely unmotivated by ideology, instead wishing to rejoin the "Organization" to regain "security, status, and a sense of belonging." Instead, the films used the backdrop of the war for morality tales designed to appeal to the broadest possible audience.

Politics and the cause of Irish nationalism was avoided to "circumvent controversy and pass the censors" in both the U.S. and Great Britain. With an eye toward distribution of the film in Britain, Joseph Breen of the Motion Picture Producers and Distributors of America, submitted the script of The Informer to the British Board of Film Censors, which requested numerous changes to omit references to the Anglo-Irish conflict.

Odd Man Out and The Informer are also similar in being "dramatic portrayals of lapsed Catholics rediscovering their lost faith," and "end with their dying protagonists assuming Christ-like poses."

== Reception ==
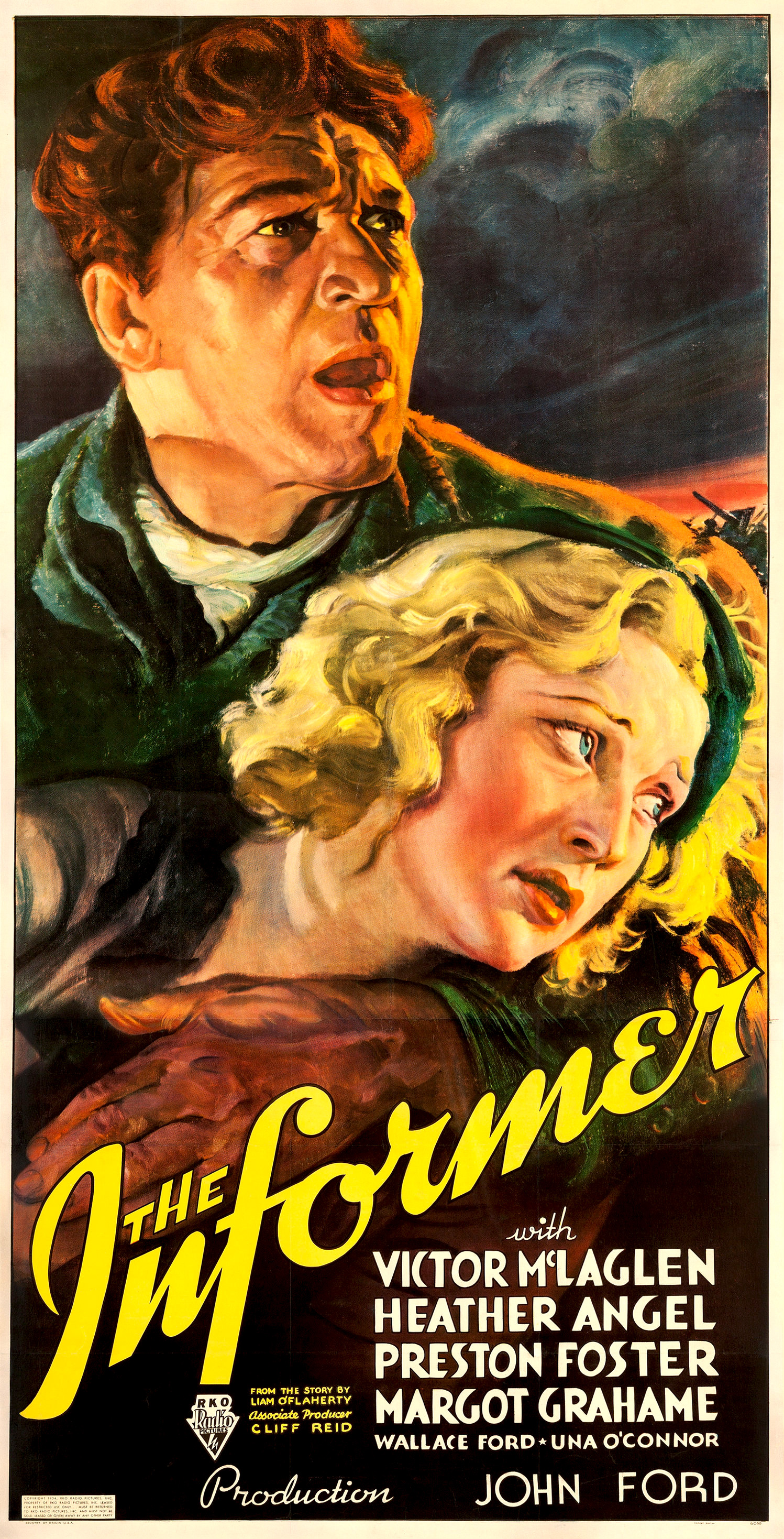
Theatrical release poster

Writing for The Spectator in 1935, Graham Greene praised the film as "a memorable picture" the substance of which made "superb material for the screen". Greene singled out the acting of Victor McLaglen for specific praise, noting that he had "never given an abler performance".

The film was popular at the box office, earning a profit of $325,000 and remains one of John Ford's most widely referenced films.

== Awards and nominations ==
=== Academy Awards – 1935 ===
The film was nominated for six Academy Awards, winning four. McLaglen won Best Actor for his portrayal of Gypo Nolan, beating out Charles Laughton, Clark Gable, and Franchot Tone for the better-remembered Mutiny on the Bounty, and Ford won Best Director. Dudley Nichols won Best Writing, Adapted Screenplay, but turned it down because of union disagreements. It was the first time an Oscar was declined, though he claimed it three years later. The film also won the Oscar for Best Score; Max Steiner won for the first time. The film was nominated for Outstanding Production, as well as for Best Film Editing.

Category	Nominee	Result
Outstanding Production	RKO Radio (John Ford, Producer)	Nominated
Best Director	John Ford	Won
Best Actor	Victor McLaglen	Won
Best Writing, Screenplay	Dudley Nichols	Won
Best Film Editing	George Hively	Nominated
Best Music (Scoring)	Max Steiner	Won

Other awards and nominations:

- National Board of Review—Best Picture
- New York Film Critics Circle Awards—Best Film and Best Director
- Venice Film Festival—John Ford nominated for the Mussolini Cup

== Reputation ==
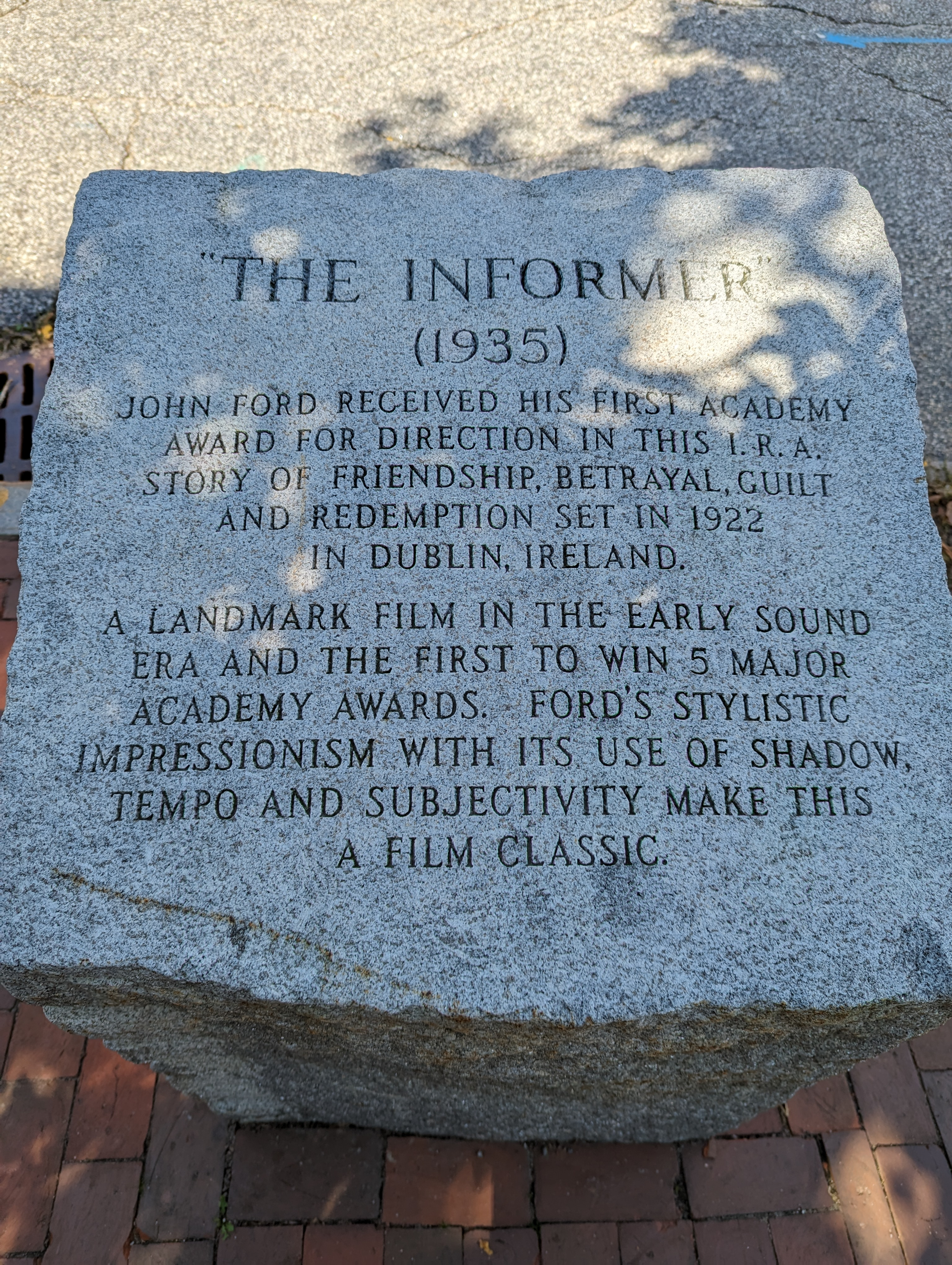
Stone inscription for The Informer at Ford's statue in Portland, Maine.

Circa 1950, The Informer graced many lists of the top films ever made, and many critics at the time considered it the greatest American sound film. The movie's reputation as one of the all-time greats has declined considerably since then.

== Adaptations in other media ==
The Informer was adapted as a radio play on the July 10, 1944, and October 17, 1950, episodes of The Screen Guild Theater, the March 28, 1948, episode of the Ford Theatre. On the Academy Award Theater's May 25, 1946, episode, McLaglen reprised his role.

In 1968, director Jules Dassin remade the film as Uptight, updating the setting from the Irish War of Independence to the black revolutionary movement in Cleveland, Ohio, following the assassination of Martin Luther King Jr.

== See also ==
- Odd Man Out
- The Plough and the Stars
- Uptight

== Sources ==
- Connelly, Mark (2012). The IRA on Film and Television : a History. Jefferson: McFarland & Co., Publishers. ISBN 9780786489619.
