= Return of the Brute =

1929 novel by Liam O'Flaherty

- First UK edition
- Author: Liam O'Flaherty
- Language: English
- Publisher: Wolfhound Press (Ireland); Mandrake Press (UK)
- Publication date: 1929
- Publication place: Irish Free State
- Media type: Print (Paperback)
- Pages: 139 pp (paperback)
- OCLC: 39867523
- Preceded by: The Wilderness
- Followed by: Tourist Guide to Ireland

Return of the Brute is a novel written by Irish writer Liam O'Flaherty and published in 1929.

== Plot ==
Based on the author's experience as an Irish Guardsman in World War I, this short novel tells the story of a squad of British soldiers in an unidentified area of the Western Front. The squad is led by Corporal Williams, an obtuse NCO, and consists of nine infantrymen, one of whom, William Gunn, is plagued by PTS and mentally unbalanced. The novel focuses on the last hours of this group of doomed individuals, which will be killed or wounded in a fruitless attempt to occupy a section of the enemy front line. Gunn will go crazy, turning into the Brute of the title, and will kill the other two surviving soldiers in the bleak ending of the novel.

== Criticism ==
David Trotter, in The Cambridge Companion to The Literature of the First World War, maintains that O'Flaherty's book—which, unlike most British war novels, was written by an author of proletarian origin—is interesting inasmuch as it "intended to do justice to the brute's point of view" (35), where brute stands for working-class soldiers. Umberto Rossi praised the book as one of the few World War I novels which did not censor the traumatic and brutal experience of front infantrymen, showing combat in the trenches for what it was with a remarkable expressionistic style; it can be thus considered a forerunner of such late-modern writers as Cormac McCarthy and William T. Vollmann.
