= Joe Burke (outfielder) =

- Right fielder
- Batted: Unknown Threw: Unknown

Negro league baseball debut
- 1937, for the Indianapolis Athletics

Last appearance
- 1937, for the St. Louis Stars
- Stats at Baseball Reference

Teams
- Indianapolis Athletics (1937); St. Louis Stars (1937)

Joseph Burke was an American professional baseball right fielder in the Negro leagues. He played with the Indianapolis Athletics and St. Louis Stars in 1937. He is also listed as Charles Burke in some sources.
