= Alton United F.C. =

- Dissolved: circa 1924
- Ground: Shauns Park and Celtic Park, Belfast
- League: Falls District League (defunct)

Alton United F.C. is a defunct Irish football club who were based in Belfast, Northern Ireland and played in the Falls District League.

During their time in the Falls District League, Alton United played their home matches in the Falls Road area of Belfast at Shauns Park and also at Celtic Park, the home ground of Belfast Celtic, on the Donegall Road in West Belfast.

The Falls League was affiliated to the Dublin-based Football Association of Ireland, which had been formed in 1921 as a breakaway from the Belfast-based Irish Football Association. The Falls Road was a largely Roman Catholic Nationalist area, and some football fans there regarded the IFA as a Unionist-dominated body. Belfast Celtic, the best Catholic-supported club, had withdrawn from the Irish League in 1920, during the instability of the Irish War of Independence, and many of its players turned out for Falls League sides, including Alton United.

The high point of Alton United's existence came when they played Shelbourne in the 1923 Irish Free State Cup Final at Dalymount Park. United were heavy underdogs going into the game and bookies had stopped taken bets on Shelbourne to win the game. United surprisingly beat Shelbourne 1–0 with the single goal scored by Andy McSherry.

In late 1923, the FAI was admitted to FIFA on condition that it confine its operation to the Irish Free State. Thus, the Falls League was disaffiliated. In 1924, Belfast Celtic re-entered the Irish League, and the Falls League faded.

== Honours ==
- FAI Cup
  - Winners 1922-23: 1
