= Edmund Curtis =

British historian (1881–1943)

- Born: 25 March 1881; Bury, Lancashire
- Died: 25 March 1943 (aged 62); Dublin
- Occupations: Historian, Professor
- Spouse: Margaret Barrington

Edmund Curtis (1881–1943) was a British historian.

== Early life ==
Curtis was born in Lancashire to Irish parents. He worked in a rubber factory until he was 15 when he continued with his education. His education was paid for through donations when it was heard that poems he had published when he was 14 and later in London in June 1896 were from a factory worker.

In 1900 he won a history scholarship to Keble College, Oxford, where he graduated in 1904.

== Career ==
Curtis secured a lectureship at the University of Sheffield following graduation. In 1912 he published his first book, The Normans in Lower Italy.

He applied for the then vacant Erasmus Smith's Chair of Modern History at Trinity College Dublin and was appointed in 1914. He held this post for 25 years. After, from 1939, he held the Lecky Chair of History (also at Trinity) for the 4 years prior to his death in 1943.

As part of his work with the Irish Manuscripts Commission he published with R. B. McDowell the Irish Historical Documents, 1172-1922 on the year of his death.

== Bibliography ==
- Roger of Sicily and the Normans in Lower Italy 1016-1154, 1912,
- A History of Medieval Ireland from 1110 to 1513, Dublin, 1923,
- Richard II in Ireland 1394-5, 1927,
- A History of Ireland, 1936.
- A history of Medieval Ireland from 1086 to 1513, 1938

As editor

- Irish Historical Documents, 1172-1922, ed. Edmund Curtis & R. B. McDowell, (Methuen) 1943
- Calendar of Ormond Deeds, six volumes (1932–43)
