= Tom Maidhc O'Flaherty =

Irish revolutionary, American politician

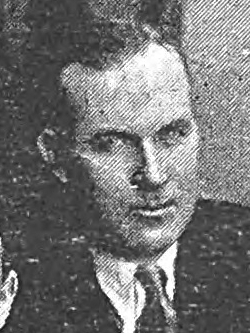
- Born: 30 December 1890; Gort na gCapall, Inishmore, United Kingdom
- Died: 19 May 1936 (aged 45); Aran Islands, Ireland
- Relatives: Liam O'Flaherty (brother)

Tom Maidhc O'Flaherty (Irish: Tomás Ó Flaithearta; also known as Thomas J. O'Flaherty; 30 December 1890 – 19 May 1936) was an Irish Communist politician in the early 20th century, a supporter of the Trotskyist James P. Cannon, and writer in English and Irish. In 1919, he, along with John Reed, Jim Larkin and others, helped to create the Communist Labor Party, a precursor to the Communist Party USA.

== Background ==
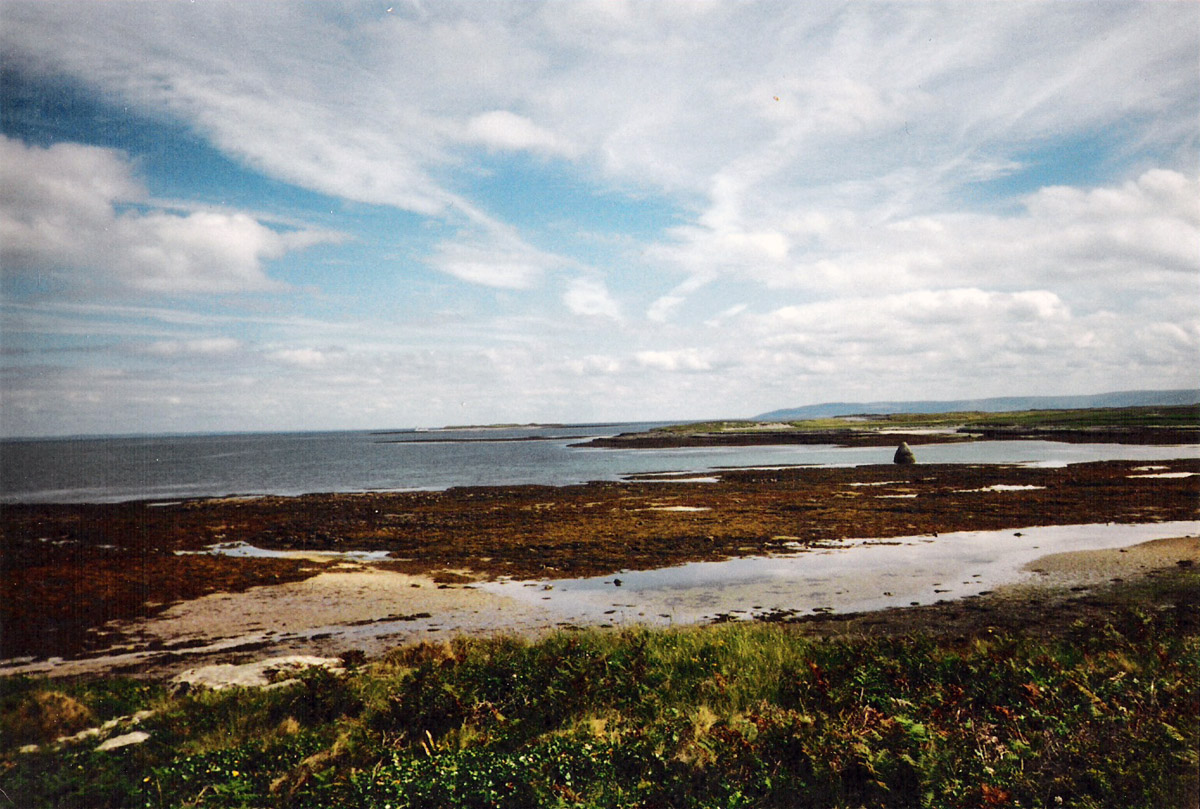
East beach of Inishmore, O'Flaherty's birthplace

Tom Maidhc O'Flaherty was born at Gort na gCapall on 30 December 1890 (though some sources state 1889), Inishmore, an island off the west coast of Ireland. His parents were Maidhc Ó Flaithearta, a well-known Irish nationalist, and Maggie Ganley. His brother was Liam O'Flaherty. His family, descendants of the Ó Flaithbertaigh family of Connemara, were not well off. The Irish language was widely spoken in the area, and the O'Flahertys spoke both English and Irish from the Gaeltacht. His sister was Bríd Ní Fhlatharta.

== Career ==
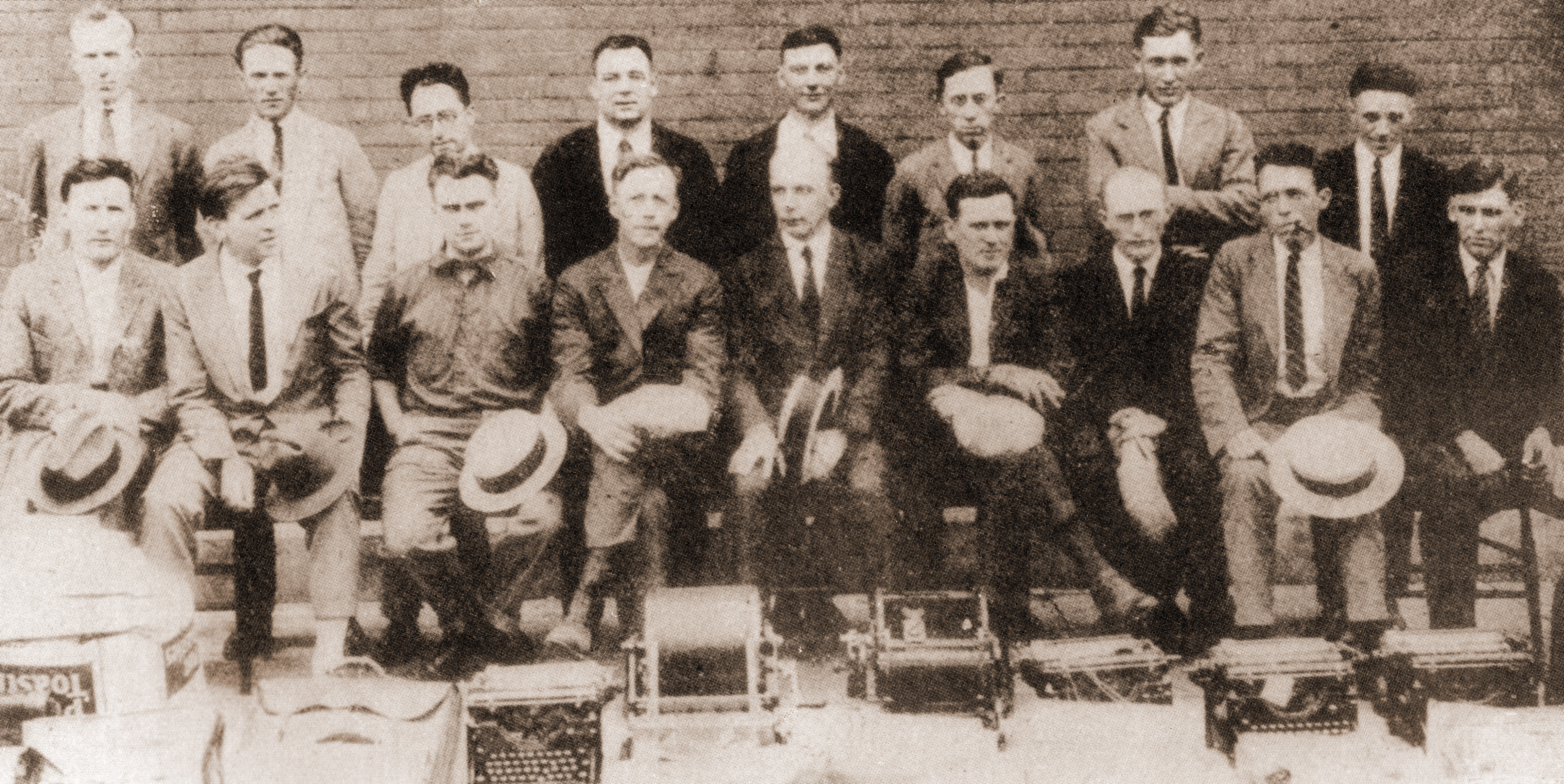
O'Flaherty (standing, far left) amongst those arrested in the 1922 Bridgman raid

O’Flatherty was a founder member of the Irish Volunteers, a militia formed to further Ireland's independence, and later migrated to the United States, where he became a member of the Industrial Workers of the World (IWW). He was among those who first joined the American Communist Party, where he was an associate of John Reed, James P. Cannon, and William F. Dunne.

He was a columnist for the Daily Worker and was the first editor of the Labor Defender. O'Flaherty was active in the defence of imprisoned Irish labour leader James Larkin and was editor of the left-wing Irish American paper The Irish People. He left the Communist Party in 1928 to co-found the Trotskyist Communist League of America and returned to Ireland in 1934 because of ill-health. There he became editor of the Irish-language left-wing paper An tÉireannach.

== Personal life ==
O'Flaherty's brother, Liam (1896–1984), was an Irish novelist and short-story writer who played an important role in the Irish literary renaissance as well as helping to found the Communist Party of Ireland. His nephew (by his sister, Bríd's Ní Fhlatharta) was Gaelic Athletic Association commentator and writer, Breandán Ó hEithir.

== Death ==
Tom Maidhc O'Flaherty died of heart failure on the Aran Islands on 19 May 1936, aged 45 (though some sources state 47).

== Works ==
Like his brother Liam, O'Flaherty retained a deep interest in the Irish language. Like Liam, he wrote fiction in English and in Irish. His works include two books of short stories: Aranmen All and Cliffmen of the West, and a collection of his short stories in Irish under the title An Bhrachlainn Mhór, published posthumously.

== Legacy ==
O’Flaherty figures in the memoir of Whittaker Chambers, who worked with him at the Daily Worker in New York City.

== See also ==
- Maidhc Ó Flaithearta
- Liam O'Flaherty
- Breandán Ó hEithir
- Whittaker Chambers

== External sources ==
- Ó hEithir, Breandán (1991). 'Liam Ó Flaithearta agus a Dhúchas' in An Chaint sa tSráidbhaile. Comhar Teoranta.
- O'Flaherty, Tom (1991 - reprint). Aranmen All. Brandon Book Publishers.
- Robinson, Tim (1995). Stones of Aran: Labyrinth. Lilliput Press.
