= Joseph Burke (cricketer) =

Irish cricketer

Cricket information
- Batting: Right-handed
- Bowling: Right-arm fast-medium

International information
- National side: Ireland

Career statistics
Competition	First-class
Matches	3
Runs scored	36
Batting average	12.00
100s/50s	0/0
Top score	19*
Balls bowled	156
Wickets	3
Bowling average	35.00
5 wickets in innings	0
10 wickets in match	0
Best bowling	2/32
Catches/stumpings	2/–
- Source: CricketArchive, 6 December 2022

Joseph Patrick Burke (31 January 1923 - 26 June 2005) was a former Irish cricketer. A right-handed batsman and right-arm fast-medium bowler, he made his debut for Ireland in a match against Lancashire in May 1954. He played for Ireland six times in total, his last match coming against the MCC in September 1958. Of these games, three had first-class status.
