= Liam O'Flaherty =

Irish novelist (1896–1984)

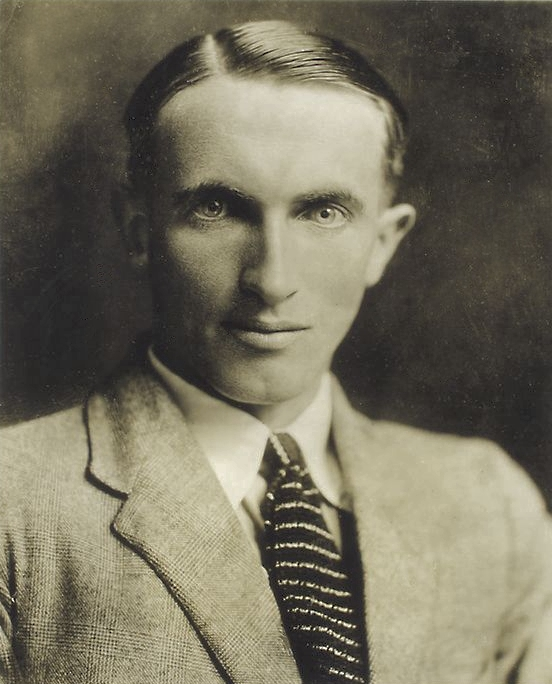
- Born: 28 August 1896; Inishmore, Ireland
- Died: 7 September 1984 (aged 88); Dublin, Ireland
- Occupation: Author
- Spouse: Margaret Barrington
- Partner: Kitty Tailer
- Children: Pegeen, Joyce
- Relatives: Tom O'Flaherty, his brother Breandán Ó hEithir, his nephew John Ford, his cousin
- Writing career
- Movements: Irish Renaissance, socialist, modernist, realist

Liam O'Flaherty (Irish: Liam Ó Flaithearta ; 28 August 1896 – 7 September 1984) was an Irish novelist and short-story writer, and one of the foremost socialist writers in the first part of the 20th century, writing about the common people's experience and from their perspective. Others are Seán O'Casey, Pádraic Ó Conaire, Peadar O'Donnell, Máirtín Ó Cadhain, and Seosamh Mac Grianna, all of them Irish language speakers who chose to write either in Irish or English.

Liam O'Flaherty served on the Western Front as a soldier in the British army's Irish Guards regiment from 1916 and was badly injured in 1917. After the war, he was a founding member of the Communist Party of Ireland. His brother Tom Maidhc O'Flaherty (also a writer) was also involved in radical politics and their father, Maidhc Ó Flaithearta, was before them. O'Flaherty wrote almost exclusively in English, except for a play, a notable collection of short stories and some poems in the Irish language.

== Early years ==
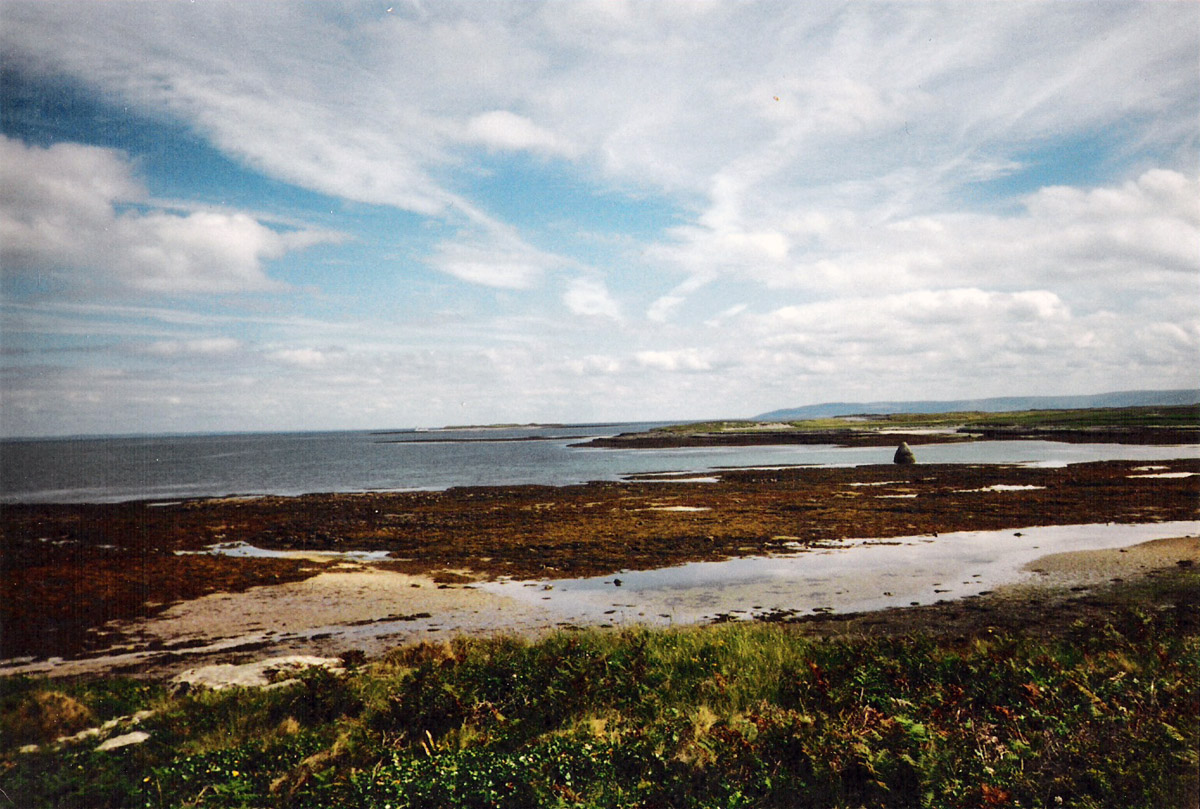
East beach of Inishmore, O'Flaherty's birthplace

O'Flaherty was born, a son of Maidhc Ó Flaithearta and Maggie Ganley, at Gort na gCapall, Inishmore. Baptised William, he adopted the form 'Liam' in the 1920s. His family, descendants of the Ó Flaithbertaigh family of Connemara, was not well off. The Irish language was widely spoken in the area, and in the O'Flaherty household, both English and Irish were used. But according to O'Flaherty, Irish was not approved at home: "permit me to say that English was the first language I spoke. My father forbade us speaking Irish. At the age of seven I revolted against father and forced everybody in the house to speak Irish."

In primary school, Liam and his brother Tom were both pupils of David O'Callaghan, a teacher who had a significant influence on the future writers. Unusually for the times, O'Callaghan taught his pupils in their native Irish and taught the O'Flahertys to write Irish. He also instilled in them a strong sense of separatist patriotism and probably added to the radicalism which they took from their father.

O'Flaherty was an uncle of Gaelic Athletic Association commentator, journalist and writer, Breandán Ó hEithir.

At the age of twelve, in 1908, he moved to County Tipperary to attend Rockwell College. When he was sixteen he won a gold medal from an organisation in Philadelphia for a piece written in Irish. Following a dispute with the college's authorities O’Flaherty was transferred, as a lay student, in 1913 to Blackrock College Dublin, where he attempted to form a troop of Irish Volunteers. He studied for a term in Holy Cross College, Clonliffe College. He enrolled for classics and philosophy at University College Dublin, where once again he attempted to form a Volunteer unit.

In 1916 he joined the British Army as a member of the Irish Guards as 'William Ganly', using his mother's surname, then serving on the Western Front. He found trench life devastating and was badly injured in September 1917 during the Battle of Langemarck, near Ypres in West Flanders. He was discharged on 7 May 1918. The shell shock he suffered profoundly affected his mental health at various times throughout his life.

He returned from the front a socialist. After being discharged, he went travelling including, if his own accounts are to be believed, North and South America, especially Cuba, as well as Europe. He joined the Industrial Workers of the World in Canada and while in New York joined the Communist Party USA, of which his brother Tom was a leading member. He returned to Ireland in late 1921.

Having become interested in Marxism as a schoolboy, atheist and communist beliefs evolved in his 20s and he was a founder member of the first Communist Party of Ireland in 1921, along with James Connolly's son Roddy Connolly, and was editor of its weekly paper, the Workers' Republic. In 1922, two days after the establishment of the Irish Free State, O'Flaherty, as Chairperson of the Council of the Unemployed and other unemployed Dublin workers, seized the Rotunda Concert Hall (the building was later separated from the Rotunda Hospital and is now divided between the Ambassador Cinema and the Gate Theatre) in Dublin and held it for four days flying a red flag, in protest at "the apathy of the authorities". Free State troops forced their surrender. O’Flaherty went to Cork where a Sinn Féin-Transport Workers' coalition had been elected but returned to Dublin in June to participate, on the Anti-Treaty Republican side, in the Battle of Dublin.

== Work ==
After the Battle of Dublin, O'Flaherty left Ireland on 9 July 1922 and moved first to London where, destitute and jobless, he took to write. In 1923, at the age of 27, O'Flaherty published his first short story, The Sniper and his first novel, Thy Neighbour's Wife. One of his close associates in London was Carl Lahr, a German socialist, who ran the Progressive Bookshop, in Red Lion Street, and whose circle included many progressive writers, among them D.H. Lawrence and Aldous Huxley. This circle of friends around Lahr was O’Flaherty's political home in many respects. It was Lahr and his wife Esther who supported O’Flaherty and published some of his works for the first time, including the play Darkness and in 1931 the only recently republished A Cure for Unemployment. He also came to the notice of Edward Garnett, chief editor in the publishing firm of Jonathan Cape, who gave encouragement to many Irish writers at the time.

Back in Dublin in 1924, O’Flaherty co-founded the Radical Club, among whose members were many progressive artists, including Harry Kernoff, and his life-long friend and leading Irish language writer, the socialist and fellow Galway man, Pádraic Ó Conaire, and was involved with the publication of the literary magazine To-Morrow (1924). In 1925 O’Flaherty scored immediate success with his best-selling novel The Informer, which won him the 1925 James Tait Black Memorial Prize for fiction. In 1925 he also first met Margaret Barrington, a writer and wife of Trinity College historian Edmund Curtis, whom he later married. The couple had one child, Pegeen (1926-2022) and divorced amicably in 1932. O’Flaherty also had a second daughter with the sister of Rose Cohen, British communist Nellie Cohen, named Joyce Rathbone (1929–2010).

Much of O’Flaherty's work in the twenties is clearly influenced by Expressionism, an anti-imperialist art form with origins in Germany. He would have come across this in the Lahr circle, but progressive writers in Ireland were also very familiar with it. The Dublin Drama League staged Ernst Toller's Masses and Man at the Abbey Theatre in January 1925. Performing the work of this influential German revolutionary and expressionist playwright, opened possibilities for a dynamic relationship between German expressionism and the Irish movement. O’Flaherty's only expressionist, Irish language play Dorchadas/Darkness, was written in 1925, and staged at the Abbey, in 1926. Apart from Dorchadas/Darkness, O’Flaherty's expressionist works include Mr Gilhooley (1926), which caused an uproar over its 'indecent' content, The Assassin (1928), based on the assassination of the Irish government minister Kevin O'Higgins in 1927, and The House of Gold (1929), which was the first of five O’Flaherty novels to be banned by the Irish State. His fine anti-war novel Return of the Brute (1929) is set in the World War I trenches and was published the same year as All Quiet on the Western Front. Another text expressing O’Flaherty's deep anti-war sentiments was the short story The Discarded Soldier written at the request of his brother Tom, for the CPUSA paper The Daily Worker (27 June 1925). This was never collected, and republished by the successor to The Daily Worker, People’s World on the centenary of the end of WWI, 9 November 2018. The atmosphere in 1920s Ireland, leading to the setting up of the Censorship of Publications Board and their banning of many works of literature, including O’Flaherty's, inspired the political satire A Tourist’s Guide To Ireland, published in 1929.

O’Flaherty left Ireland again for London in early 1930 and from there travelled to the USSR on a Soviet ship on 23 April 1930. Diplomatic relations between Britain and the USSR were newly re-established after collapsing in May 1924. Russian was the first language into which O’Flaherty's work was translated, and during the 1920s, he was the most widely translated Irish author in the Soviet Union. He employs a self-declared unreliable narrator in his political satire I Went to Russia, published by Cape in 1931, which begins "I set out to join the great horde of … liars who have been flooding the book markets of the world … with books about the Bolsheviks". O'Flaherty would later express regret about the way that the book had been misinterpreted as representing a genuine disillusionment on his part, describing the USSR in 1934 as 'that workshop...where the civilization of the future is being hammered out.'

Victor Gollancz published Skerrett in 1932. O’Flaherty spent the best part of a year in the United States, from late April 1934 to June 1935, mostly in Hollywood. It was the year his relative John Ford made the famous film adaptation of O’Flaherty's 1925 novel The Informer, which premiered on 1 May 1935. The novel had previously been made into a film in 1929, also called The Informer, directed by Arthur Robison. Written quite cinematically in the 1920s, when cinema was still a relatively new art form, some of O’Flaherty's novels lent themselves easily to film adaptations.

It was in California that O’Flaherty met his future partner Kitty Tailer. A sardonic account of his experience in Hollywood is given in his only novel set outside Ireland, the social satire Hollywood Cemetery (1935). He also worked with the French director Jeff Musso in the making of other films based on his novels Mr Gilhooly and The Puritan. His autobiography Shame the Devil appeared in 1934, and in 1937 The Short Stories of Liam O’Flaherty as well as the first serious artistic account of the Irish Famine, Famine, written uncompromisingly from the people's point of view and telling of their resistance.

By 1940 he was living in the United States with Tailer, the couple returned to Ireland in 1952.

Most of O'Flaherty's writing took place in the fourteen years starting with the publication of his first novel, 1923-1937 (between the ages of 27 and 41), when he wrote 14 of his 16 novels as well as many of his short stories, the play, and some non-fiction books, as well as poetry.

== Writing in Irish ==
As well as his play Dorchadas and some poetry, O’Flaherty was a distinguished short story writer in Irish. The collection Dúil, published in 1953 when his writing activity was coming to an end, contained 18 short stories in Irish which he had written over many years. Some of the stories in Dúil are similar to the short stories O'Flaherty previously published in English. According to Angeline A. Kelly, at least two of the 18, Daoine Bochta and An Fiach, both written in 1925, were originally written in Irish. The other stories may have begun as unpublished stories written in Irish, but which got their first publication by being reformulated into English before finally being published in their original Irish version in Dúil. This was probably the case for Díoltas, for example, which became The Pedlar's Revenge. This collection, now widely admired, had a poor reception at the time and this seems to have discouraged him from proceeding with an Irish language novel he had in hand. In a letter written to The Sunday Times years later, he confessed to a certain ambivalence regarding his work in Irish, and spoke of other Irish writers who received little praise for their work in the language. This gave rise to some controversy.

In a letter to the Editor of the Irish Statesman, O’Flaherty had commented in 1927 on the issue of his writing in Irish: "I wrote a few short stories for the Gaelic League organ. They printed them … I consulted Pádraic Ó Conaire and we decided that drama was the best means of starting a new literature in Irish … the two of us went to Dublin …[and] put our scheme before them [the Gaeltacht Commission] for a travelling theatre and so on. I guaranteed to write ten plays. They thought we were mad and, indeed, took very little interest in us. In fact, I could see by their looks and their conversation that they considered us immoral persons". Shortly after this an end was put to the whole idea when the editor of An Claidheamh Soluis came to O’Flaherty one day and said that he was forced to tell him that his writings would be no longer welcome in An Claidheamh Soluis. O’Flaherty commented "That news disgusted me; but it disgusted Pádraic even more". The play O’Flaherty wrote, "undaunted" by this reception, and which he gave to Gearóid Ó Lochlainn, was Dorchadas, possibly the only expressionist play to be written in Irish. It was performed at the Abbey a few weeks after Sean O’Casey's The Plough and the Stars at the same theatre. O’Flaherty writes that it was "packed, which rarely happens for these Gaelic plays" and that it was packed with detectives. It first appeared in print in O’Flaherty's own translation into English in The New Coterie, a magazine edited by Charles Lahr and Esther Archer in the summer of 1926.

In 2020, Mícheál Ó Conghaile published a translation of thirty of O’Flaherty's English language short stories into Irish. Seán Ó Ríordáin said of O’Flaherty's writing in Irish: "I have read some stories by Liam O’Flaherty and sensed that some living things had been caught between the covers. If you held a robin and felt it quiver in your hands you would know what I felt reading O’Flaherty’s Irish."

== Censorship in Ireland and republishing by Irish publishers of O’Flaherty's work ==
In 1929, at the recommendation of the Committee on Evil Literature, the Censorship of Publications Act established the Censorship of Publications Board to examine books and periodicals, with the authority to prohibit any of these they found to be obscene. Their decision made it illegal to buy, sell or distribute that publication in the Republic of Ireland. The first book to be banned by this Board was O'Flaherty's expressionist Galway novel The House of Gold which took to task the gombeen men who seized power in the Irish Free State following independence. The other banned works by O’Flaherty were: The Puritan (1932), The Martyr, (1933), Shame the Devil (1934), Hollywood Cemetery (1937). All of O’Flaherty's novels were first printed outside Ireland.

It was not until the founding of Wolfhound Press by Seamus Cashman in 1974 that many of O’Flaherty’s works finally found an Irish publishing house. Cashman's publishing house re-printed many of O’Flaherty's novels and collections of short stories throughout the 1970s and 1980s.

Nuascéalta has reprinted for the first time since their banning the novels that had not been republished since: The House of Gold (2013), Hollywood Cemetery (2019) and The Martyr (2020). In addition, Nuascéalta republished the virtually unknown short story The Cure for Unemployment (Three Leaves of a Bitter Shamrock, 2014).

== Later years ==
O’Flaherty's last novel, Insurrection, about the Easter Rising, was published in 1950. Despite his abhorrence of war, O’Flaherty portrays the possibility of fighting for a justified cause, a war of liberation in this novel, written in the immediate aftermath of the Second World War. O’Flaherty's last short story appeared in 1958.

O'Flaherty died on 7 September 1984, aged 88, in Dublin. His ashes were scattered on the cliffs of his native Inis Mór.

In 2012, The Liam & Tom O’Flaherty Society was set up to promote the writings and work of both O’Flaherty brothers, their life and times.

== Works ==
=== Novels ===
- Thy Neighbour's Wife (Jonathan Cape, 1923; republished Merlin Publishing 1992)
- The Black Soul (Jonathan Cape, 1924; republished Merlin Publishing 1996)
- The Informer (Jonathan Cape, 1925; republished Sceptre, 1989)
  - adapted to film twice: The Informer (1929 film), and The Informer (1935 film)
- Mr. Gilhooley (Jonathan Cape, 1926; republished Merlin Publishing 1991)
- The Wilderness (serialised 1927, republished Wolfhound Press, 1978)
- The Assassin (Jonathan Cape, 1928; republished Wolfhound Press, 1984)
- Return of the Brute (Mandrake Press, 1929; republished Merlin Publishing 1998)
- The House of Gold (Jonathan Cape, 1929; republished Createspace, 2013), the first novel banned by the Irish Free State, for alleged indecency.
- The Ecstasy of Angus (1931)
  - O'Flaherty recorded a spoken word version, released as a double-album record in 1978 by Claddagh Records, Dublin, catalogue no. CCT 15 & 16.
- The Puritan (Jonathan Cape, 1932; republished Merlin Publishing, 2001)
- Skerrett (Victor Gollancz, 1932; republished Wolfhound Press, 1977)
- Famine (Victor Gollancz, 1937; republished Wolfhound Press, 1984)
- Land (Victor Gollancz, 1946)
- Insurrection (1950; republished Merlin Publishing 1993)

Political Satire

- A Tourist's Guide To Ireland (1929)
- I Went to Russia (1931)
- The Martyr (1933), banned, republished 2020

Social Satire

- Hollywood Cemetery (1935), banned and republished in 2019

=== Short stories and collections ===
In 1999, when compiling all of O'Flaherty's short stories A. A. Kelly found a total of 183. These were published in a 3 volume set, Liam O'Flaherty: The Collected Stories. The original publication of these stories was spread between over a dozen journals and magazines. Many collections have also been published, including collections containing selections of stories from previous collections. Kelly's introduction to her collection mentions that most of O'Flaherty's stories can be found in eight original collections. The front flap of the hardback book's cover gives the names of six of these:

- Spring Sowing (1924)
- The Tent (1926)
- The Mountain Tavern (1928)
- Two Lovely Beasts and Other Stories (1950)
- Dúil (1953)
- The Pedlar's Revenge and Other Short Stories (1976, but written much earlier)

His best-known short story is The Sniper. Others include Civil War, The Shilling, Going into Exile, Night Porter, A Red Petticoat, and His First Flight – about the nervousness before doing something new.

=== Theatre ===
- Dorchadas/ Darkness
  - The play was performed in Irish, as Dorchadas, in 1926 and in 2014.

=== For children ===
- The Fairy Goose and Two Other Stories (1927) London: Crosby Gaige .
- The Wild Swan and Other Stories (1932) London Joiner & Steele
- All Things Come of Age: A Rabbit Story, short story, included in The Pedlar's Revenge and Other Stories
- The Test of Courage, short story, included in The Pedlar's Revenge and Other Stories

=== Non-fiction ===
- Life of Tim Healy (1927), a biography
- Two Years, or Two Years of My Life (1930), memoirs
- A Cure for Unemployment (1931)
- Shame The Devil (1934), memoirs
- The Letters of Liam O'Flaherty (1996), published posthumously, edited by Angeline A. Kelly, ISBN 0-86327-380-7

== See also ==
- Peadar O'Donnell — revolutionary socialist from the Donegal Gaeltacht

== Biographies and studies of his work ==
Books about O'Flaherty and his works:

- John Zneimer, The Literary Vision of Liam O'Flaherty,1970, ISBN 978-0815600732
- James H. O’Brien, Liam O'Flaherty,1973, ISBN 978-0838777725
- Angeline A. Kelly, Liam O'Flaherty, the Storyteller, The Macmillan Press, London 1976, ISBN 0-333-19768-2
- George Jefferson, Liam O'Flaherty: A Descriptive Bibliography of his Works, Wolfhound Press, Dublin 1993, ISBN 0-86327-188-X
- Pat Sheeran, Novels of Liam O'Flaherty: A Study in Romantic Realism, Wolfhound Press, 1976, ISBN 978-0950345468
- Peter Costello, Liam O'Flaherty's Ireland (1996) contains the essential facts, along with many pictures, portraits, and a full bibliography; ISBN 978-0863275500
- Peter Costello, The heart grown brutal (1977) provides background to his best writing, ISBN 978-0847660070
- The letters of Liam O'Flaherty, ed. A. A. Kelly (1996), fully annotated, includes material from many collections, ISBN 978-0863273803

Chapters or papers:

- Elisabeth Schnack, in German, chapter "Liam O'Flaherty" of Müssen Künstler einsam sein? (Must Artists be Lonely?), pp. 47–60, Pendo Verlag, Zurich 1991, ISBN 3-85842-191-X
- Brian Ó Conchubhair (ed.), 2014, Introduction. In: Liam O’Flaherty, Darkness, Arlen House. ASIN: B01K94VI7K

Film documentaries:

- Idir Dhá Theanga (Between Two Languages) is a 2002 documentary film about Liam Ó Flatharta by Alan Titley and Mac Dara Ó Curraidhín.
