= Thy Neighbour's Wife =

1923 novel by Liam O'Flaherty

- Author: Liam O'Flaherty
- Publisher: J. Cape
- Publication date: 1923

Thy Neighbour's Wife (1923) was the first novel by the Irish writer Liam O'Flaherty.
