= Irish conjugation =

Aspect of verbs in the Irish language

In the Irish language, verb forms are constructed either "synthetically" or "analytically":

Synthetic forms express the information about person and number in the ending: e.g., molaim "I praise", where the ending -aim stands for "first person singular present". In this case, a pronoun is not allowed: *molaim mé is ungrammatical. Molann mé is allowed but using the -aim ending is more common.

Analytic forms are those whose endings contain no information about person and number, and a pronoun is necessary: e.g., molann sibh "you (pl.) praise", where the ending -ann expresses only the present tense, and the pronoun sibh "you" (pl.) must accompany it in order to express "second person plural".

In addition to the three persons, Irish also has an impersonal form (also called the "autonomous" form), which is used in forming the passive and can conveniently be translated with "one" or "someone" as the subject. Shown below are the distribution of synthetic and analytic forms in the standard language; in the dialects, other patterns may be found, although some of the most important distinctions made in certain dialects are pointed out in this article.

See Irish orthography for the pronunciation of verb endings.

== Regular verbs ==
There are two conjugation classes of regular verbs, as illustrated below. Forms in italics are not part of the standard language. The suffixes shown change to agree with the word ending in a velarised ("broad") consonant or palatalised ("slender") consonant. In the examples below, verbs ending with "broad" consonants are shown above those ending with "slender" consonants.

In the imperfect, preterite, and conditional, a consonant-initial stem undergoes lenition (and dialectally is preceded by do), while a vowel-initial stem is prefixed by d’. A stem beginning with ⟨f⟩ + a vowel takes both, e.g. fan "wait", d'fhan sé "he waited". The preterite impersonal, e.g. fanadh "one waited", neither undergoes lenition nor receives d'. The -⟨f⟩- in future and conditional stems is pronounced /h/; except in the conditional 2nd person singular and the impersonal, where it remains /f/.

=== 1st conjugation ===
| Tense | | Particle | Mutation | Ending | | | | | | |
| Tense | | Particle | Mutation | Analytic | Synthetic | | | | | |
| Tense | | Particle | Mutation | Analytic | Singular | | Plural | | | Impersonal |
| Tense | | Particle | Mutation | Analytic | 1st | 2nd | 1st | 2nd | 3rd | Impersonal |
|---|---|---|---|---|---|---|---|---|---|---|
| Indicative | Present | — | — | -(e)ann | -(a)im | -(a)ir | -(a)imid | —N/a | -(a)id | -t(e)ar |
| Indicative | Past Imperfect | — | Lenition | -(e)adh | -(a)inn | -t(e)á | -(a)imis | —N/a | -(a)idís | -t(a)í |
| Indicative | Past Perfect | — | Lenition | —N/a | -(e)as | -(a)is | -(e)amar | -(e)abhar | -(e)adar | -(e)adh |
| Indicative | Future | — | — | -f(a)idh | -f(e)ad | -f(a)ir | -f(a)imid | —N/a | -f(a)id | -f(e)ar |
| Conditional | | — | Lenition | -f(e)adh | -f(a)inn | -f(e)á | -f(a)imis | —N/a | -f(a)idís | -f(a)í |
| Imperative | | — | — | -(e)adh | -(a)im | —N/a | -(a)imis | -(a)igí/-(a)idh | -(a)idís | -t(e)ar |
| Subjunctive | Present | go | Eclipsis | -a/-e | -(e)ad | -(a)ir | -(a)imid | —N/a | -(a)id | -t(e)ar |
| Subjunctive | Past | dá | Eclipsis | -(e)adh | -(a)inn | -t(e)á | -(a)imis | —N/a | -(a)idís | -t(a)í |
| Past Participle | | — | | -ta/-te | —N/a | | | | | |

1st conjugation examples: mol "to praise" and tuig "to understand"
| Tense | | Analytic | Synthetic | | | | | |
| Tense | | Analytic | Singular | | Plural | | | Impersonal |
| Tense | | Analytic | 1st | 2nd | 1st | 2nd | 3rd | Impersonal |
|---|---|---|---|---|---|---|---|---|
| Indicative | Present | molann tuigeann | molaim tuigim | molair tuigir | molaimid tuigimid | —N/a | molaid tuigid | moltar tuigtear |
| Indicative | Past Imperfect | mholadh thuigeadh | mholainn thuiginn | mholtá thuigteá | mholaimis thuigimis | —N/a | mholaidís thuigidís | moltaí tuigtí |
| Indicative | Past Perfect | mhol thuig | mholas thuigeas | mholais thuigis | mholamar thuigeamar | mholabhar thuigeabhar | mholadar thuigeadar | mholadh thuigeadh |
| Indicative | Future | molfaidh tuigfidh | molfad tuigfead | molfair tuigfir | molfaimid tuigfimid | —N/a | molfaid tuigfid | molfar tuigfear |
| Conditional | | mholfadh thuigfeadh | mholfainn thuigfinn | mholfá thuigfeá | mholfaimis thuigfimis | —N/a | mholfaidís thuigfidís | mholfaí thuigfí |
| Imperative | | moladh tuigeadh | molaim tuigim | mol tuig | molaimis tuigimis | molaigí / molaidh tuigigí / tuigidh | molaidís tuigidís | moltar tuigtear |
| Subjunctive | Present | go mola go dtuige | go molad go dtuigead | go molair go dtuigir | go molaimid go dtuigimid | —N/a | go molaid go dtuigid | go moltar go dtuigtear |
| Subjunctive | Past | dá moladh dá dtuigeadh | dá molainn dá dtuiginn | dá moltá dá dtuigteá | dá molaimis dá dtuigimis | —N/a | dá molaidís dá dtuigidís | dá moltaí dá dtuigtí |
| Past Participle | | molta tuigthe | —N/a | | | | | |

=== 2nd conjugation ===
Second stem verbs take the same base suffixes as first conjugation verbs, but add the infix in -⟨(a)í⟩- (most forms), or -⟨eo, ó⟩- (in the future and conditional).

Roots ending in a slender consonant undergo syncope before the addition of -⟨í⟩-.

| Tense | | Particle | Mutation | Ending | | | | | | |
| Tense | | Particle | Mutation | Analytic | Synthetic | | | | | |
| Tense | | Particle | Mutation | Analytic | Singular | | Plural | | | Impersonal |
| Tense | | Particle | Mutation | Analytic | 1st | 2nd | 1st | 2nd | 3rd | Impersonal |
|---|---|---|---|---|---|---|---|---|---|---|
| Indicative | Present | — | — | -(a)íonn | -(a)ím | -(a)ír | -(a)ímid | —N/a | -(a)íd | -(a)ítear |
| Indicative | Past Imperfect | — | Lenition | -(a)íodh | -(a)ínn | -(a)íteá | -(a)ímis | —N/a | -(a)ídís | -(a)ítí |
| Indicative | Past Perfect | — | Lenition | —N/a | -(a)íos | -(a)ís | -(a)íomar | -(a)íobhar | -(a)íodar | -(a)íodh |
| Indicative | Future | — | — | -óidh/-eoidh | -ód/-eod | -óir/-eoir | -óimid/-eoimid | —N/a | -óid/-eoid | -ófar/-eofar |
| Conditional | | — | Lenition | -ódh/-eodh | -óinn/-eoinn | -ófá/-eofá | -óimis/-eoimis | —N/a | -óidís/-eoidís | -ófaí/-eofaí |
| Imperative | | — | — | -(a)íodh | -(a)ím | —N/a | -(a)ímis | -(a)ígí/-(a)ídh | -(a)ídís | -(a)ítear |
| Subjunctive | Present | go | Eclipsis | -(a)í | -(a)íod | -(a)ír | -(a)ímid | —N/a | -(a)íd | -(a)ítear |
| Subjunctive | Past | dá | Eclipsis | -(a)íodh | -(a)ínn | -(a)íteá | -(a)ímis | —N/a | -(a)ídís | -(a)ítí |
| Past Participle | | — | | -t(h)e | —N/a | | | | | |

2nd conjugation examples: tosaigh "to begin” and inis "to tell"
| Tense | | Analytic | Synthetic | | | | | |
| Tense | | Analytic | Singular | | Plural | | | Impersonal |
| Tense | | Analytic | 1st | 2nd | 1st | 2nd | 3rd | Impersonal |
|---|---|---|---|---|---|---|---|---|
| Indicative | Present | tosaíonn insíonn | tosaím insím | tosaír insír | tosaímid insímid | —N/a | tosaíd insíd | tosaítear insítear |
| Indicative | Past Imperfect | thosaíodh d'insíodh | thosaínn d'insínn | thosaíteá d'insíteá | thosaímis d'insímis | —N/a | thosaídís d'insídís | thosaítí d'insítí |
| Indicative | Past Perfect | thosaigh d'inis | thosaíos d'insíos | thosaís d'insís | thosaíomar d'insíomar | thosaíobhar d'insíobhar | thosaíodar d'insíodar | thosaíodh d'insíodh |
| Indicative | Future | tosóidh inseoidh | tosód inseod | tosóir inseoir | tosóimid inseoimid | —N/a | tosóid inseoid | tosófar inseofar |
| Conditional | | thosódh d'inseodh | thosóinn d'inseoinn | thosófa d'inseofá | thosóimis d'inseoimis | —N/a | thosóidís d'inseoidís | thosófaí d'inseofaí |
| Imperative | | tosaíodh insíodh | tosaím insím | tosaigh inis | tosaímis insímis | tosaígí / tosaídh insígí / insídh | tosaídís insídís | tosaítear insítear |
| Subjunctive | Present | go dtosaí go n-insí | go dtosaíod go n-insíod | go dtosaír go n-insír | go dtosaímid go n-insímid | —N/a | go dtosaíd go n-insíd | go dtosaítear go n-insítear |
| Subjunctive | Past | dá dtosaíodh dá n-insíodh | dá dtosaínn dá n-insínn | dá dtosaíteá dá n-insíteá | dá dtosaímis dá n-insímis | —N/a | dá dtosaídís dá n-insídís | dá dtosaítí dá n-insítí |
| Past participle | | tosaithe inste | —N/a | | | | | |

== Irregular verbs ==
There are eleven irregular verbs in Standard Irish, whose equivalents when translated into English are irregular verbs as well (e.g. the Irish irregular verb abair is translated into "to say" in English, but the English word "say" itself is also an irregular verb); individual dialects have a few more. Most of them are characterized by suppletion, that is, different roots are used to form different tenses. Analytic forms are indicated by the symbol +. The preterites of many irregular verbs take the nonpreterite forms of preverbal particles, i.e. an (interrogative particle) and ní (negative particle), instead of ar (pret. interrogative particle) and níor (pret. negative particle). Some verbs have different independent and dependent forms in certain tenses; the independent forms are used when no particle precedes the verb, and also after má "if" (open conditional) and the direct relative particle a, while the dependent forms are used after all other particles.

=== Abair "to say" ===
The ⟨d⟩- in this verb's independent forms is not lenited, and the dependent forms are slightly archaic.

Abair conjugation
| Abair, "to say" | | | Analytic | Synthetic |
|---|---|---|---|---|
| Indicative | Present | Independent | deir | deir- |
| Indicative | Present | Dependent | abrann | ab(a)r- |
| Indicative | Past Imperfect | Independent | deireadh | deir- |
| Indicative | Past Imperfect | Dependent | abradh | ab(a)r- |
| Indicative | Past Perfect | | dúirt | dúr- |
| Indicative | Future | Independent | déarfaidh | déar- |
| Indicative | Future | Dependent | abróidh | abró- |
| Conditional | | Independent | déarfadh | déar- |
| Conditional | | Dependent | abródh | abró- |
| Imperative | | | abradh | abair, abraigí; abr- |
| Subjunctive | Present | Independent | go ndeire | go ndeir- |
| Subjunctive | Present | Dependent | go n-abra | go n-abr- |
| Subjunctive | Past | Independent | dá ndeireadh | dá ndeir- |
| Subjunctive | Past | Dependent | dá n-abradh | dá n-abr- |
| Verbal Noun | | | rá | |
| Past Participle | | | ráite | |

=== Beir "to catch" ===
Beir conjugation
| Beir, "to bear" | | Standard | | Munster | |
| Beir, "to bear" | | Analytic | Synthetic | Analytic | Synthetic |
|---|---|---|---|---|---|
| Indicative | Present | beireann | beir- | | |
| Indicative | Past Imperfect | bheireadh | bheir | | |
| Indicative | Past Perfect | rug | rug- | riug | riug- |
| Indicative | Future | béarfaidh | béar- | | |
| Conditional | | béarfadh | béar- | | |
| Imperative | | beireadh | beir- | | |
| Subjunctive | Present | go mbeire | go mbeir- | | |
| Subjunctive | Past | dá mbeireadh | dá mbeir- | | |
| Verbal Noun | | breith | | | |
| Past Participle | | beirthe | | | |

=== Bí "to be" ===
If a noun phrase is in the predicate, then forms of the particle is are used rather than anything below.

Bí conjugation
| Bí, "to be" | | | Analytic | Synthetic |
|---|---|---|---|---|
| Indicative | Present | Independent | tá(nn) | taoi (2pS), táthaoi (2pP), tádar (3pP); tái- |
| Indicative | Present | Dependent | fuil | fuil- |
| Indicative | Present | Negative | níl | níl- |
| Indicative | Present Habitual | | bíonn | bí- |
| Indicative | Past Imperfect | | bhíodh | bhí- |
| Indicative | Past Perfect | Independent | bhí | bhío- |
| Indicative | Past Perfect | Dependent | raibh | rabh- |
| Indicative | Future | | beidh | be- |
| Conditional | | | bheadh | bhei- |
| Imperative | | | bíodh | bí, bígí; bí- |
| Subjunctive | Present | | go raibh | go rabh- |
| Subjunctive | Past | | dá mbeadh | dá mbei- |
| Verbal Noun | | | bheith | |
| Past Participle | | | (none) | |

=== Clois/Cluin "to hear" ===
Clois is used in southern and south-central Irish (Munster, Connemara, Aran Islands etc.), whereas cluin is used in northern and north-central varieties (Mayo, Ulster).

Clois/Cluin conjugation
| Clois/ Cluin "to hear" | | Southern Irish | | Northern Irish | |
| Clois/ Cluin "to hear" | | Analytic | Synthetic | Analytic | Synthetic |
|---|---|---|---|---|---|
| Indicative | Present | cloiseann | clois- | cluineann | cluin- |
| Indicative | Past Imperfect | chloiseadh | chlois- | chluineadh | chluin- |
| Indicative | Past Perfect | chuala | chual- | chuala | chual- |
| Indicative | Future | cloisfidh | clois- | cluinfidh | cluin- |
| Conditional | | chloisfeadh | chlois- | chluinfeadh | chluin- |
| Imperative | | cloiseadh | clois, cloisigí; clois- | cluineadh | cluin, cluinigí; cluin- |
| Subjunctive | Present | go gcloise | go gclois- | go gcluine | go gcluin- |
| Subjunctive | Past | dá gcloiseadh | dá gclois- | dá gcluineadh | dá gcluin- |
| Verbal Noun | | cloisteáil | | cluinstin | |
| Past Participle | | cloiste | | cluinte | |

=== Déan "to do, to make" ===
Déan conjugation
| Déan, "to do, to make" | | | Standard | | Munster | | Ulster, Aran (Connacht) | |
| Déan, "to do, to make" | | | Analytic | Synthetic | Analytic | Synthetic | Analytic | Synthetic |
|---|---|---|---|---|---|---|---|---|
| Indicative | Present | Independent | ghní(onn) | ghní- | | | | |
| Indicative | Present | Dependent | déanann | déan- | deineann | dein- | | |
| Indicative | Past Imperfect | Independent | (gh)níodh | ghní- | | | ghníodh | ghní- |
| Indicative | Past Imperfect | Dependent | dhéanadh | dhéan- | dhein | dhein- | | |
| Indicative | Past Perfect | Independent | rinne | rinn- | dheineadh | dhein- | rinn | rinn- |
| Indicative | Past Perfect | Dependent | dearna | dearn- | dheineadh | dhein- | dearn | dearn- |
| Indicative | Future | Independent | déanfaidh | déan- | | | | |
| Indicative | Future | Dependent | déanfaidh | déan- | | | | |
| Conditional | | Independent | dhéanfadh | dhéan- | | | | |
| Conditional | | Dependent | dhéanfadh | dhéan- | | | | |
| Imperative | | | déanadh | déan, déanaigí; déan- | deineadh | dein, deinigí; dein- | | |
| Subjunctive | | Present | go ndéana | go ndéan- | go ndeina | go ndein- | | |
| Subjunctive | | Past | dá ndéanadh | dá ndéan- | dá ndeineadh | dá ndein- | | |
| Verbal Noun | | | déanamh | | | | | |
| Past Participle | | | déanta | | | | | |

=== Faigh "to find, to get" ===
The ⟨f⟩- in forms of this verb is eclipsed rather than lenited after ní.

Faigh conjugation
| Faigh, "to get" | | | Analytic | Synthetic |
|---|---|---|---|---|
| Indicative | Present | Independent | gheibheann | gheibh- |
| Indicative | Present | Dependent | faigheann | faigh- |
| Indicative | Past Imperfect | Independent | gheibheadh | gheibh- |
| Indicative | Past Imperfect | Dependent | d'fhaigheadh | d'faigh- |
| Indicative | Past Perfect | | fuair | fuair- |
| Indicative | Future | Independent | gheobhaidh | gheobh- |
| Indicative | Future | Dependent | faighidh | faigh- |
| Conditional | | Independent | gheobhadh | gheobh- |
| Conditional | | Dependent | faigheadh | faigh- |
| Imperative | | | faigheadh | faigh, faighigí; faigh- |
| Subjunctive | | Present | go bhfaighe | go bhfaigh- |
| Subjunctive | | Past | dá bhfaigheadh | dá bhfaigh- |
| Verbal Noun | | | fáil | |
| Past Participle | | | faighte | |

=== Feic "to see" ===
Feic conjugation
| Feic, "to see" | | | Standard | | Munster | | Ulster | |
| Feic, "to see" | | | Analytic | Synthetic | Analytic | Synthetic | Analytic | Synthetic |
|---|---|---|---|---|---|---|---|---|
| Indicative | Present | Independent | feiceann | feic- | c(h)íonn | c(h)í- | tchíonn | tchí- |
| Indicative | Present | Dependent | feiceann | feic- | feiceann | feic- | feiceann | feic- |
| Indicative | Past Imperfect | Independent | d'fheiceadh | fheic | c(h)íodh | c(h)í- | tíodh | tchí- |
| Indicative | Past Imperfect | Dependent | fheiceadh | fheic- | | | | |
| Indicative | Past Perfect | Independent | chonaic | chonaic- | chnaic | chnaic- | thain(a)ic | thainic- |
| Indicative | Past Perfect | Dependent | faca | fac- | feaca(igh) | feaca- | faca | fac- |
| Indicative | Future | Independent | feicfidh | feic- | c(h)ífidh | c(h)í- | tchífidh | tchí- |
| Indicative | Future | Dependent | feicfidh | feic- | gcífidh | gcí- | tchífidh | tchí- |
| Conditional | | Independent | d'fheicfeadh | d'fheic- | c(h)ífeadh | c(h)í | tchífeadh | tchí- |
| Conditional | | Dependent | fheicfeadh | fheic- | gcífeadh | gcí- | tchífeadh | tchí- |
| Imperative | | | feiceadh | feic, feicigí; feic- | | | | |
| Subjunctive | | Present | go bhfeice | go bhfeic- | | | | |
| Subjunctive | | Past | dá bhfeiceadh | dá bhfeic- | | | | |
| Verbal Noun | | | feiceáil | | feiscint | | | |
| Past Participle | | | feicthe | | | | | |

=== Ith "to eat" ===
Ith conjugation
| Ith, "to eat" | | Standard | | Cape Clear (Munster) | |
| Ith, "to eat" | | Analytic | Synthetic | Analytic | Synthetic |
|---|---|---|---|---|---|
| Indicative | Present | itheann | ith- | | |
| Indicative | Past Imperfect | d'itheadh | d'ith- | | |
| Indicative | Past Perfect | d'ith | d'ith- | duaidh | dua- |
| Indicative | Future | íosfaidh | íosfai- | | |
| Conditional | Independent | d'íosfadh | díos- | | |
| Conditional | Dependent | íosfadh | íos- | | |
| Imperative | | itheadh | ith, ithigí; ith- | | |
| Subjunctive | Present | go n-ithe | go n-ith- | | |
| Subjunctive | Past | dá n-itheadh | dá n-ith- | | |
| Verbal Noun | | ithe | | | |
| Past Participle | | ite | | | |

=== Tabhair "to give, to bring, (to be named)" ===
Tabhair conjugation
| Tabhair, "to give, to bring" | | | Analytic | Synthetic |
|---|---|---|---|---|
| Indicative | Present | General | tug | tug- |
| Indicative | Present | Independent | bheir | bheir- |
| Indicative | Present | Dependent | tabhrann | tabh(a)r- |
| Indicative | Past Imperfect | General | thugadh | thug- |
| Indicative | Past Imperfect | Independent | bheirinn | bheir- |
| Indicative | Past Imperfect | Dependent | tabhrainn | tabh(a)r- |
| Indicative | Past Perfect | | thug | thug- |
| Indicative | Future | General | tabharfaidh | tabhar- |
| Indicative | Future | Independent | bhéaraid | bhéar- |
| Indicative | Future | Dependent | tiubhraid | tiubhr- |
| Conditional | | General | thabharfadh | thabhar- |
| Conditional | | Independent | bhéarfadh | bhéar- |
| Conditional | | Dependent | tiubhradh | tiubhr- |
| Imperative | | | tugadh | tabhair, tugaigí; tug- |
| Subjunctive | | Present | go dtuga | go dtug- |
| Subjunctive | | Past | dá dtugadh | dá dtug- |
| Verbal Noun | | | tabhairt | |
| Past Participle | | | tugtha | |

The meaning "to be named" is often found in writings and can therefore be considered as strange for learners. When meaning "to be named" the verbform is usually followed by the preposition "ar", which is also inflected due to the person it is connected with. e.g.:

- Bhí Seán, mar a thugtaí air, an-shásta. "Seán, as he was (usually) called, was very happy."
- Tá Seán ag tabhairt an úill dom. "Seán is giving me the apple."

=== Tar "to come" ===
Tar conjugation
| Tar, "to come" | | Standard | | Connacht (some) | | Munster (some) | | Ulster | |
| Tar, "to come" | | Analytic | Synthetic | Analytic | Synthetic | Analytic | Synthetic | Analytic | Synthetic |
|---|---|---|---|---|---|---|---|---|---|
| Indicative | Present | tagann (tig le) | tag- | teagann | teag- | tigeann | tig- | tig | tig- |
| Indicative | Past Imperfect | thagadh | thag- | | | | | | |
| Indicative | Past Perfect | tháinig | tháng- | | | | | | |
| Indicative | Future | tiocfaidh | tioc- | | | | | | |
| Conditional | | thiocfadh | thioc- | | | | | | |
| Imperative | | tagadh | tar, tagaigí; tag- | tagadh | teara, tagaigí; tag- | tagadh | tair, tagaigí; tag- | tagadh | gabh, tagaigí; tag- |
| Subjunctive | Present | go dtaga | go dtag- | | | go dtí | go dtí- | go dtí | go dtí- |
| Subjunctive | Past | dá dtagadh | dá dtag- | | | | | | |
| Verbal Noun | | teacht | | | | | | | |
| Past Participle | | tagtha | | | | | | | |

=== Téigh "to go" ===
Téigh conjugation
| Téigh, "to go" | | | Standard | | Connemara (Connacht) | | Munster | | Ulster | |
| Téigh, "to go" | | | Analytic | Synthetic | Analytic | Synthetic | Analytic | Synthetic | Analytic | Synthetic |
|---|---|---|---|---|---|---|---|---|---|---|
| Indicative | Present | | téann | téi- | | | | | | |
| Indicative | Past Imperfect | | théadh | théi- | | | | | | |
| Indicative | Past Perfect | Independent | chuaigh | chu- | | | | | | |
| Indicative | Past Perfect | Dependent | deachaigh | deach- | | | | | | |
| Indicative | Future | | rachaidh (raghfaidh) | rach- (raghf-) | gabhfaidh | gabhf- | raghaidh | ragh- | | |
| Conditional | | | rachadh (raghfadh) | rach- (raghf-) | ghabhfadh | ghabhf- | raghadh | ragh- | | |
| Imperative | | | téadh | téi- | téadh | teire/ gabh; té- | téadh | teir, teiridh; té- | téadh | téithear; gabh-/té- |
| Subjunctive | Present | | go dté | go dté- | | | | | | |
| Subjunctive | Past | | dá dtéadh | dá dté- | | | | | | |
| Verbal Noun | | | dul | | goil | | | | goil | |
| Past Participle | | | dulta | | goite | | | | goite | |

== Preverbal particles ==
Irish uses a number of preverbal particles to modify the meaning of a sentence. In a positive statement, no particle is used and the verb comes first (except in Munster Irish where do is placed before verbs in the past, habitual past and conditional, leniting the verb that follows). This is still seen in the Standard Language in said tenses, prefixed to verbs beginning with vowels, e.g. d'ól mé (Munster Irish: d'ólas) "I drank":

- Tuigeann Seán Gaeilge. "Seán understands Irish."
- Thuig Seán Gaeilge. "Seán understood Irish."
- Thuigfeadh Seán Gaeilge. "Seán would understand Irish."

=== Negative particles ===
To negate a statement, the particle ní is used, which causes lenition; a ⟨d’⟩ before a vowel or lenited ⟨f⟩ is omitted:

- Ní thuigeann Seán Gaeilge. "Seán doesn't understand Irish."
- Ní thuigfeadh Seán Gaeilge. "Seán wouldn't understand Irish."
- Ní ólfadh Séamas an bainne. "Séamas would not drink the milk." (cf. D'ólfadh Séamas an bainne. "Séamas would drink the milk.")
- Ní fhanfadh Úna liom. "Úna would not wait for me." (cf. D'fhanfadh Úna liom. "Úna would wait for me.")

In the preterite, the particle níor is used. There is lenition but no d’.

- Níor thuig Seán Gaeilge. "Seán didn't understand Irish."
- Níor ól Séamas an bainne. "Séamas didn't drink the milk." (cf. D'ól Séamas an bainne. "Séamas drank the milk.")
- Níor fhan Úna liom. "Úna didn't wait for me." (cf. D'fhan Úna liom. "Úna waited for me.")

(In Ulster, the negative particles cha(n), pret. char are also used)

=== Interrogative particles ===
To pose a simple yes/no question, the particle an is used, which causes eclipsis (no eclipsis of vowels, because an already ends with ⟨n⟩). In the preterite ar (+ lenition) is used. The prefix d’ is omitted:

- An dtuigeann Seán Gaeilge? "Does Seán understand Irish?"
- An dtuigfeadh Seán Gaeilge? "Would Seán understand Irish?"
- An ólann Séamas bainne? "Does Séamas drink milk?"
- An bhfanfadh Úna liom? "Would Úna wait for me?"
- Ar thuig Seán Gaeilge? "Did Seán understand Irish?"
- Ar ól Séamas an bainne? "Did Séamas drink the milk?"
- Ar fhan Úna liom? "Did Úna wait for me?"

These particles are also used to introduce an indirect question:

- Níl a fhios agam an dtuigeann Seán Gaeilge. "I don't know if Seán understands Irish."
- Ní mé ar ól Séamas an bainne. "I wonder if Séamas drank the milk."

=== Negative interrogative particles ===
To pose a negative yes/no question, the particle nach is used, which causes eclipsis (in preterite: nár + lenition):

- Nach dtuigeann Seán Gaeilge? "Doesn't Seán understand Irish?"
- Nach dtuigfeadh Seán Gaeilge? "Wouldn't Seán understand Irish?"
- Nach n-ólfadh Séamas an bainne? "Wouldn't Séamas drink the milk?"
- Nach bhfanfadh Úna liom? "Wouldn't Úna wait for me?"
- Nár thuig Seán Gaeilge? "Didn't Seán understand Irish?"
- Nár ól Séamas an bainne? "Didn't Séamas drink the milk?"
- Nár fhan Úna liom? "Didn't Úna wait for me?"

(In Munster ná is used instead of nach.)

=== Wh-interrogative particles ===
To pose a wh-question, one of the interrogative particles cá, cad a/céard a, cathain a, cé a, conas a etc. is used.

- Cá gcuirfidh tú an litir? "Where will you put the letter?"
- Cad/Céard a cheapfaidh na comharsana? "What will the neighbors think?"
- Cathain a dhíolfaidh sibh bhur dteach? "When will you sell your house?"
- Cé a sheasfaidh i m'aice? "Who will stand next to me?"
- Conas a ghlanfaidh tú an gúna? "How will you clean the dress?"

== Verbal nouns ==
=== Formation ===
Irish has no infinitive and uses instead the verbal noun. The verbal noun can be formed using different strategies (mostly suffixes). The most common of these are:

- Suffix -adh, e.g., bog "soften": bogadh
- Suffix -áil, e.g., fág "leave": fágáil
- Suffix -ú, e.g., ardaigh "lift": ardú
- Suffix -amh, e.g., caith "spend": caitheamh
- Suffix -t, e.g., cosain "defend": cosaint
- Suffix -úint, e.g., lean "follow": leanúint
- Slender consonant is made broad, e.g., coisc "prevent": cosc
- Suffix -ach, e.g., ceannaigh "buy": ceannach
- No change, e.g., ól "drink": ól
- Suffix -cht, e.g., dúisigh "awake": dúiseacht
- Suffix -e, e.g., rinc "dance": rince

=== Usage ===
The verbal noun is used as the infinitive would be used in English.

D'iarr sé orm imeacht. "He asked me to go."
B'fhearr liom fanacht. "I would rather stay."

A progressive can be expressed with the preposition ag and is equivalent to the English present participle.

Tá Seán ag obair. "Seán is working."
Bhí Máire ag caint. "Máire was speaking."

A perfect tense can be formed with either of the compound prepositions tar éis or i ndiaidh and the verbal noun.

Tá sí tar éis baint an fhéir. "She has (just) mowed the grass." (cf. Hiberno-English "She is after cutting the grass.")
Bhí sé i ndiaidh ní na gcupán. "He had (just) washed the cups." (cf. Hiberno-English "He was after washing the cups.")

== The subjunctive ==
The subjunctive covers the idea of wishing something and so appears in some famous Irish proverbs and blessings. It is considered an old-fashioned tense for daily speech (except in set phrases) but still appears often in print. E.g.,

- Go dté tú slán. "May you be well." (lit: May you go well.)
- Go dtuga Dia ciall duit. "May God give you sense."
- Go ndéana an Diabhal toirneach de d'anam in Ifreann. "May the Devil make thunder of your soul in Hell."

When the subjunctive is used in English, it may not be used in Irish, and another tense might be used instead:

- Dá mba (past/conditional of the copula) mise tusa, dhéanfainn (conditional) staidéar ar don scrúdú amárach. "If I were (past subjunctive) you, I would study for the exam tomorrow."
- Tá sé tábhachtach go roghnaíonn (present indicative) sé ar an mbealach ceart. "It is important that he choose (present sub.) the right way."
- Nuair a bheidh (future ind.) tú níos sine, beidh tú a thuiscint. "When you're (present ind.) older, you'll understand."
- Is mian liom go raibh (present sub.) tú anseo. "I wish (that) you were (past sub.) here."

While the relative pronoun that can be omitted in English, the corresponding go is mandatory in Irish.

== See also ==
- Irish grammar
