= Irish syntax =

Syntax of the Irish language

Irish syntax refers to how words and morphemes combine to form larger units such as phrases and sentences in the Irish language. It is rather different from that of most Indo-European languages, especially because of its VSO word order.

== Normal word order ==
The normal word order in an Irish sentence is:

1. Preverbal particle
2. Verb
3. Subject
4. Direct object or predicate adjective
5. Indirect object
6. Location descriptor
7. Manner descriptor
8. Time descriptor

Only the verb and subject are obligatory; all other parts are optional (unless the primary or finite verb is transitive, in which case a direct object is required). In synthetic verb forms, the verb and subject are united in a single word, so that even one-word sentences are possible, e.g. Tuigim "I understand."

An example sentence:

Labhraíonn Mícheál Gaeilge le Cáit go minic.
speak.PRES Mícheál Irish with Cáit PTC often
Mícheál often speaks Irish with Cáit.

== Questions and answers ==
Irish has no words for "yes" and "no". The answer to a question contains a repetition of the verb, either with or without a negative particle. For analytic forms, only the verb is given and the subject is not repeated. If a verb has different dependent and independent forms, the dependent form follows the interrogative or negative particle. The independent form is used where there is no particle.

An éisteann Seán lena mháthair riamh?
Q listen.PRES Seán {to his} mother ever
Does Seán ever listen to his mother?"

Éisteann.
listen.PRES
Yes, he does.

*Éisteann sé.
listen.PRES 3S.M.CNJV

Ní éisteann.
not listen.PRES
No, he does not.

*Ní éisteann sé.
not listen.PRES 3S.M.CNJV

Nach bhfuil tú ag éisteacht liom?
NEG.Q EXIST.PRES.DEP 2S.CNJV at listen.VN {to me}
Aren't you listening to me?

Táim.
EXIST.1S.PRES
Yes, I am.

Nílim.
EXIST.1S.PRES.NEG
No, I'm not.

== Commands ==
In a command the imperative mood is used, and no subject is given.

Tabhair dúinn dhá ghloine fuisce {le do thoil}.
give.2SG.IMPR {to us} two glasses whiskey.GEN please
Please give us two glasses of whiskey.

To express a negative command, the particle ná is used. This particle, which can be roughly translated "don't", causes neither eclipsis nor lenition, and attaches h to a following vowel.

Ná cailligí an t-airgead.
don't lose.2PL.IMP the money
Don't lose the money!

Ná habair leo é.
don't tell.2SG.IMP {to them} 3S.M.DSJV
Don't tell it to them!

Ná téimis abhaile.
don't go.1PL.IMP home
Let's not go home!

== Syntax of the verbal noun ==
A progressive aspect can be formed by connecting the verbal noun to the existential verb with the progressive particle ag.

Tá Mícheál ag labhairt Gaeilge le Cáit anois.
EXIST.PRES Mícheál at speak.VN Irish with Cáit now
Mícheál is speaking Irish with Cáit now.

The object of a verbal noun is in the genitive, if it is definite.

Tá Séamas ag léamh an nuachtáin.
EXIST.PRES Séamas at read.VN the newspaper.GEN
Séamas is reading the newspaper.

If a nonfinite clause forms the complement of the verb, the verbal noun stands alone (without a preposition) in the clause.

D'éirigh liom breith ar an liathróid.
be-successful.PRET {with me} catch.VN on the ball
I succeeded in catching the ball.

The direct object of a verbal noun complement precedes the verbal noun; the leniting particle a "to" is placed between them. Other complements follow.

Tá brath agam an scian a chur go cúramach ar an mbord.
EXIST.PRES intention {at me} the knife to put.VN PTC careful on the table
I intend to place the knife carefully on the table.

== Object pronouns ==
Generally, an object pronoun or a conjugated preposition stands at the end of a sentence in Irish. Compare this sentence:

D'inis sé an scéal do Bhríd inné.
tell.PRET 3S.M.CNJV the story to Bríd yesterday
He told the story to Bríd yesterday.

with the two following sentences:

D'inis sé do Bhríd inné é.
tell.PRET 3S.M.CNJV to Bríd yesterday 3S.M.DSJV
He told it to Bríd yesterday.

D'inis sé an scéal inné di
tell.PRET 3S.M.CNJV the story yesterday {to her}
He told her the story yesterday.

== Passive ==
Irish commonly uses the impersonal form (also called the autonomous form) instead of the passive voice.

Buaileadh an madra.
beat.IMPRS.PRET the dog
Someone beat the dog/The dog was beaten.

In the perfect, the passive voice is formed by using the passive participle with the existential verb.

Tá an fhuinneog briste (ag mo dheartháir).
EXIST.PRES the window broken (by my brother)
The window has been broken (by my brother).

== Stative verbs ==
Some verbs describing the state or condition of a person form a progressive present with the existential verb plus 'in (my, your, his etc.)' plus the verbal noun.

Tá mé i mo chodladh.
EXIST.PRES 1S in my sleep.VN
I'm asleep.

An bhfuil tú i do chónaí sa Ghearmáin?
Q EXIST.PRES.DEP 2S.CNJV in your.SG live.VN {in the} Germany
Do you live in Germany?

== Forms meaning "to be" ==
Irish, like Spanish and other languages, has two forms that can express the English verb "to be". The two forms perform different grammatical functions.

=== Existential verb bí ===
The existential verb is bí. It is an irregular verb; see Irish verbs for its conjugation.

==== Existence, condition or location ====
This verb expresses the absolute existence of something, its condition, or its location. When accompanied by the adverb ann "there", it means "exist" or "there is/are". Otherwise, the verb is complemented by an adjective, an adverb or a prepositional phrase.

Tá Dia ann.
EXIST.PRES God there
God exists; There is a God.

Tá an bosca folamh.
EXIST.PRES the box empty
The box is empty.

Tá na húlla ar an mbord.
EXIST.PRES the.PL apple.PL on the table
The apples are on the table.

==== Definitions ====
A noun phrase alone cannot form the predicate of the existential verb. Instead, the noun complement is preceded by a form meaning "in my, in your, in his", etc.

Tá Seán ina dhochtúir.
EXIST.PRES Seán {in his} doctor
Seán is a doctor.

=== The copula is ===
The Irish copula is not a verb but a particle, used to express a definition or identification. It may be complemented by a noun, a pronoun, an adjective, or a topicalized phrase. Because it is not a verb, it does not inflect for person or number, and pronouns appear in the disjunctive form.

The copula, which has the realis form is, is used for identification and definition:

Definition: X is a Y. Here, the word order is "Is-Y-(pronoun)-X". X is a definite noun or a pronoun.

Is fear é.
COP.PRES man 3S.DSJV
It/he is a man.

Is Sasanaigh iad.
COP.PRES English-person.PL 3P.DSJV
They are English.

Identification: X is the Y. Here the word order is "Is-pronoun-X-Y", or "Is-pronoun-Y-X". There must always be a pronoun between a definite noun and the copula. It would be wrong to say *Is Seán an múinteoir, which would mean "The teacher is a Seán".

Is é Seán an múinteoir.
COP.PRES 3S.M.DSJV Seán the teacher
Seán is the teacher.

To identify a first or second person pronoun with a definite noun, it is usual to use the longer form of the personal pronoun, which comes immediately after the copula:

- (26a) Is mise an múinteoir. "I am the teacher."
- (26b) Is tusa an scoláire. "You are the student."
- (26c) Is sinne na múinteoirí. "We are the teachers."
- (26d) Is sibhse na scoláirí. "You are the students."

The long form of the personal pronoun is very emphatic and stressed and often ejects the copula entirely. Thus, in the previous four examples, it is possible to leave out the copula, which will then be understood:

- (27a) Mise an múinteoir.
- (27b) Tusa an scoláire.
- (27c) Sinne na múinteoirí.
- (27d) Sibhse na scoláirí.

If a third-person pronoun with a definite noun is identified, the same construction may be used:

- (28a) (Is) eisean an múinteoir. "He is the teacher."
- (28b) (Is) ise an scoláire. "She is the student."
- (28c) (Is) iadsan na saighdiúirí. "They are the soldiers".

However, in the third person, that is perceived to be much more emphatic than in the first and second persons. The usual way to say "He is the teacher" is

- (28d) Is é an múinteoir é.

in which the definite noun is flanked by two personal pronouns agreeing with it in gender and number.

When saying "this is", or "that is", seo and sin are used, in which case is is usually dropped:

- (29a) Seo í mo mháthair. "This is my mother."
- (29b) Sin é an muinteoir. "That's the teacher."

One can also add "that is in him/her/it", especially when an adjective is used if one wants to emphasise the quality:

Is fear láidir atá ann.
COP.PRES man strong EXIST.REL.PRES {in him}
He's a strong man.

Is cailín álainn atá inti.
COP.PRES girl beautiful EXIST.REL.PRES {in her}
She's a beautiful girl.

That sometimes appears in Hiberno-English, translated literally as "that is in it" or as "so it is".

The present tense of the copula can be used for the future:

- (32) Is múinteoir é. "He will be a teacher."

The past tense of the copula can be used for the conditional:

- (33) Ba mhúinteoir í. "She would be a teacher."

The forms is and ba are not used after preverbal particles.

- (34a) An múinteoir thú? "Are you a teacher?"
- (34b) Níor mhúinteoirí sinn. "We were not teachers."

If the predicate is definite, the copula is followed by a disjunctive personal pronoun, which may be repeated at the end of the sentence.

- (35a) Is í Siobhán an múinteoir. "Siobhán is the teacher."
- (35b) Is iad na daoine sin na múinteoirí. "Those people are the teachers."
- (35c) Is é an múinteoir é. "He is the teacher."

If the predicate is indefinite, it follows the copula directly, with the disjunctive pronoun and subject coming at the end.

- (36a) Is dalta mé. "I am a student."
- (36b) Is múinteoir í Cáit. "Cáit is a teacher."

The copula can also be used to stress an adjective, as in the following instance:

Is breá an lá é.
COP.PRES nice the day 3S.M.DSJV
It's a nice day.

==== Topicalization ====
Topicalization in Irish is formed by clefting: by fronting the topicalized element as the predicate of the copula, while the rest of the sentence becomes a relative clause. Compare Dúirt mise é "I said it" with Is mise a dúirt é "I said it."

==== Other uses for the copula ====
There are other set idiomatic phrases using the copula, as seen in the following examples. Here the predicate consists mostly of either a prepositional phrase or an adjective.

- (38a) Is maith liom "I like" (lit. "is good with me")
- (38b) Ba mhaith liom "I would like" (lit. "would be good with me")
- (38c) Is fearr liom "I prefer" (lit. "is better with me")
- (38d) Is féidir liom "I can" (lit. "is possible with me")
- (38e) Ba cheart "one should" (lit. "would be right")
- (38f) Níor cheart "one shouldn't" (lit. "would not be right")
- (38g) Is fuath liom "I hate" (lit. "is hatred with me")
- (38h) Is cuma liom "I don't care" (lit. "is indifferent with me")
- (38i) Is mian liom "I wish/would like" (lit. "is desire with me")
- (38j) Is cuimhin liom "I remember" (lit. "is memory with me")

There are also the following constructions:

Is deacair an abairt seo a thuiscint.
COP.PRES difficult the sentence this to understand-VN
This sentence is hard to understand.

Is le Cáit an gluaisteán.
COP.PRES with Cáit the car
The car belongs to Cáit.

Is as {Baile Átha Cliath} Máire.
COP.PRES from Dublin Máire
Máire is from Dublin.

==== Answering questions with copula ====
Since the copula cannot stand alone, the answer must contain either a part of the predicate or a pronoun, both of which follow the copula.

- (42) An é Seán an múinteoir? "Is Seán the teacher?"
  - (42.1) Is é. "Yes, he is."
  - (42.2) Ní hé. "No, he isn't."
- (43) An múinteoir é Seán? "Is Seán a teacher?"
  - (43.1) Is ea. "Yes, he is."
  - (43.2) Ní hea. "No, he isn't."

==== Omission of is ====
In all dialects, the copula is may be omitted if the predicate is a noun. (Ba cannot be deleted.) If is is omitted, the following é, í, iad preceding the noun is omitted as well.

- (44a) (Is) mise an múinteoir. "I am the teacher."
- (44b) (Is é) Seán an múinteoir. "Seán is the teacher."
- (44c) (Is) dalta mé. "I am a student."

=== Comparison of the existential verb and the copula ===
Both the existential verb and the copula may take a nominal predicate, but the two constructions have slightly different meanings: Is dochtúir é Seán sounds more permanent: it represents something absolute about Seán; it is a permanent characteristic of Seán that he is a doctor. That is known as an individual-level predicate. In the sentence Tá Seán ina dhochtúir, one says rather that Seán performs the job of a doctor, he is a doctor at the moment, or he has become a doctor. That is known as a stage-level predicate.

== Subordination ==
Most complementizers (subordinating conjunctions) in Irish cause eclipsis and require the dependent form of irregular verbs. The word order in an Irish subordinate clause is the same as in a main clause. The types of subordination discussed here are: complementation, relative clauses, and wh-questions (which are formed as a kind of relative clause in Irish).

=== Complementation ===
==== Syntactic complementation ====
The subordinate clause is a part of the main clause in a purely syntactic complementation. In Irish it is introduced by go "that" in the positive and nach "that... not" in the negative.

Deir sé go bhfuil deifir air.
say.PRES 3S.M.CNJV that EXIST.PRES.DEP hurry {upon him}
He says that he's in a hurry.

Chruthaigh sé nach raibh taibhse ann.
prove.PRET 3S.M.CNJV that.NEG EXIST.PRET.DEP ghost there
He proved that there was no ghost.

Other examples of complex sentences using complementizers:

- (47a) Bhí faitíos roimhe mar go raibh sé taghdach. "People were afraid of him because he was quick-tempered."
- (47b) Ní chreidim é cé go bhfeicim é. "I don't believe it although I see it."
- (47c) Scríobh sí síos é ar nós nach ndéanfadh sí dearmad air. "She wrote it down so that she wouldn't forget it."
- (47d) Fan nó go dtiocfaidh sé. "Wait until he comes."

==== Conditional complementation ====
A conditional clause gives the condition under which something will happen. In Irish there are two kinds of conditional clauses, depending on the plausibility of the condition. The particle má introduces a conditional clause that is plausible, also called a realis condition. Má causes lenition and takes the independent form of irregular verbs. Its negated form is mura and causes eclipsis. Preceding the preterite it is murar and causes lenition.

If the condition of the clause is hypothetical, also called an irrealis condition or counterfactual conditional, the word dá is used, which causes eclipsis and takes the dependent form of irregular verbs. The negated equivalent is either mura or murach go, meaning roughly "if it were not the case that...". The verb in both clauses is in the conditional.

- (48a) Má chreideann sé an scéal sin, tá sé saonta go maith. "If he believes that story, he is pretty gullible." (realis)
- (48b) Murar chaill sé é, ghoid sé é. "If he didn't lose it, then he stole it." (realis)
- (48c) Dá bhfágfainn agat é ní dhéanfá é. "If I left it to you, you wouldn't do it." (irrealis)

Other examples of conditionals are:

- (49a) Éireoidh leis an bhfiontar i gcleithiúnas go mbeidh cách páirteach ann. "The venture will succeed provided that all take part in it."
- (49b) Tig leat é a bhriseadh ar chuntar go n-íocfaidh tú as. "You may break it provided that you pay for it."

=== Relative clauses ===
==== Direct relative ====
There are two kinds of relative clauses in Irish: direct and indirect. Direct relative clauses begin with the leniting relativizer a and the independent form of an irregular verb is used. The direct relative is used when the relative pronoun is the subject or direct object of its clause.

- (50a) D'imigh na daoine a bhí míshásta thar sáile. "The people who were unhappy went overseas."
- (50b) Sin í an obair a rinne mé. "That's the work that I did."

The direct relative is also used in topicalizations, e.g.:

- (51) Is é Jimmy a chuaigh go Méiriceá. "It's Jimmy who went to America."

The direct relative is also used after the word uair "time":

- (52) an chéad uair a bhí mé ann "the first time that I was there"

==== Indirect relative ====
Indirect relative clauses begin with the eclipsing relativizer a (in the preterite with leniting ar); the dependent form of an irregular verb is used. The indirect relative is used to signify a genitive or the object of a preposition. In these cases, there is a resumptive pronoun in the relative clause.

- (53a) an fear a raibh a dheirfiúr san ospidéal "the man whose sister was in the hospital" (lit. "the man that his sister was in the hospital")
- (53b) an fear ar thug a iníon céad punt dó "the man whose daughter gave him a hundred pounds" or "the man to whom his daughter gave a hundred pounds" (lit. "the man that his daughter gave him a hundred pounds")
- (53c) an seomra ar chodail mé ann "the room that I slept in" (lit. "the room that I slept in it")

The negative form of a relative clause, direct or indirect, is formed with the eclipsing relativizer nach, or, before the preterite, with the leniting relativizer nár.

- (54a) Sin rud nach dtuigim. "That's something I don't understand." (direct)
- (54b) bean nach bhfuil a mac ag obair "a woman whose son isn't working" (indirect; lit. "a woman that her son isn't working")

Sometimes a direct relative clause can be ambiguous in meaning, leaving unclear if the relative is accusative or nominative:

- (55) an sagart a phóg an bhean "the priest who kissed the woman" or "the priest whom the woman kissed"

If the accusative reading is intended, one could use an indirect relative with a resumptive pronoun:

- (56) an sagart ar phóg an bhean é "the priest whom the woman kissed" (lit. "the priest that the woman kissed him")

=== Wh-questions ===
A wh-question begins with a word such as "who, what, how, when, where, why" etc. In Irish, such questions are constructed as relative clauses, in that they can be constructed as either direct or indirect.

==== Direct relative wh-questions ====
Questions with "who, what, how many, which, when" are constructed as direct relative clauses.

- (57a) Cathain/Cá huair a tharla sé? "When did it happen?"
- (57b) Cé a rinne é? "Who did it?"
- (57c) Céard a fuair tú? "What did you get?"
- (57d) Cé mhéad míle a shiúil tú? "How many miles did you walk?"
- (57e) Cé acu is daoire, feoil nó iasc? "Which is more expensive, meat or fish?"

==== Indirect relative wh-questions ====
Questions with prepositions (i.e. "on what?, with whom?") and questions with "why?" and "where?" are constructed as indirect relative clauses.

- (58a) Cé aige a bhfuil an t-airgead? "Who has the money?" (lit. "who at him is the money")
- (58b) Cá leis ar thóg tú an gluaisteán? "What did you lift the car with?" (lit. "what with it did you lift the car")
- (58c) Cad chuige ar bhuail tú é? "Why did you hit him?"
- (58d) Cén áit a bhfaca tú an bhean? "Where did you see the woman?"

==== Clauses introduced by "how" ====
There are two words for "how" in Irish: the word conas takes the direct relative clause, the phrase cén chaoi takes the indirect.

- (59a) Conas a tharla sé? "How did it happen?"
- (59b) Cén chaoi a mbaineann sin leat? "How does that concern you?/What business is that of yours?"

=== Complementary subordinate clauses in the form of a relative clause ===
Some complements in Irish take the form of a relative, in that they end in the relative particle a; both direct and indirect relative are found.

Direct

- (60a) Nuair a bhí mé óg, bhí mé i mo chónaí i nDún na nGall. "When I was young, I lived in Donegal."
- (60b) Glaofaidh sí chomh luath agus a thiocfaidh sí abhaile. "She will call as soon as she gets home."
- (60c) Bhí sé ag caoineadh an t-achar a bhí sé ag caint liom. "He was crying while he was talking to me."
- (60d) Seinneadh port ansin, mar a rinneadh go minic. "Then a melody was played, as one often did ."
- (60e) Bhog sé a cheann ar nós mar a bheadh sé ag seinm. "He moved his head as if he were playing music."
- (60f) Tig leat é a choinneáil fad is a thugann tú aire dó. "You may hold it as long as you are careful with it."

Indirect

- (61a) Lorg iad mar ar chuir tú iad. "Look for them where you put them."
- (61b) Fan san áit a bhfuil tú. "Stay where you are!"
- (61c) An t-am ar tháinig sé, bhíodar díolta ar fad. "By the time he came, they were all sold out."
- (61d) Inseoidh mé sin dó ach a bhfeicfidh mé é. "I will tell him that as soon as I see him."
- (61e) D'fhág sí é sa gcaoi a raibh sé. "She left it as it was."

== See also ==
- Goidelic substrate hypothesis
