= Dependent and independent verb forms =

In the Goidelic languages and Modern Greek, dependent and independent verb forms are distinct verb forms; In Goidelic languages each tense of each verb exists in both forms, and in Greek this only applies to the non-past tense. Verbs are often preceded by a particle which marks negation, marks a question, changes the mood, or has some other force. The dependent verb forms are used after a particle, while independent forms are used when the verb is not subject to a particle.

For example, in Irish, the past tense of the verb feic ("to see") has two forms: the independent form chonaic and the dependent form faca. The independent form is used when no particle precedes the verb, as in Chonaic mé Seán ("I saw John"). (Note: As the Goidelic languages use verb–subject–object word orders, the verb chonaic ("saw") precedes the subject mé ("I").) The dependent form is used when a particle such as ní ("not") precedes the verb, as in Ní fhaca mé Seán ("I did not see John"). (Note: The particle ní triggers lenition of the verb, changing faca (pronounced [ˈfˠakə]) to fhaca (pronounced [ˈakə]).)

== Goidelic languages ==
=== Old Irish ===
The distinction between dependent and independent forms originates with two distinct but related phenomena in Old Irish: the contrast between absolute and conjunct verb endings, and the contrast between prototonic and deuterotonic forms.

Old Irish verbs that have no prefixes, called "simple verbs", have two sets of endings, absolute and conjunct. The conjunct endings are used after a variety of grammatical particles, including among others the negative particle ní ("not"), the interrogative particle in, and prepositions combined with the relative pronoun (e.g. lasa "with which"). Where no such "conjunct particle" is present, the absolute endings are used. For example, "he calls" is gairid (absolute), while examples of conjunct forms are ní·gair "he does not call" and lasa·ngair "with which he calls". (An interpunct "·", hyphen "-", or colon ":" is usually used to indicate conjunct forms in pedagogical and analytical works on Old Irish. Actual manuscripts do not use such punctuation marks.) When a particle is present, stress falls on the first syllable of the verb itself, i.e. the syllable after the "·" mark.

In most verbs, distinct absolute and conjunct endings are found in the present indicative, present subjunctive, future, and preterite, and most persons. For example, a partial paradigm of gaibid ("take") is as follows:

| Person | Present indicative | |
| Person | Absolute | Conjunct |
|---|---|---|
| 1 sg. | (·)gaibiu, (·)gaibim | |
| 2 sg. | (·)gaibi | |
| 3 sg. | gaibid | ·gaib |
| 1 pl. | gaibmi | ·gaibem, ·gabam |
| 2 pl. | gaibthe | ·gaibid |
| 3 pl. | gaibit | ·gaibet |

| Person | Present subjunctive | |
| Person | Absolute | Conjunct |
|---|---|---|
| 1 sg. | gaba | ·gab, ·gaib |
| 2 sg. | (·)gabae | |
| 3 sg. | gabaid | ·gaba |
| 1 pl. | gabmai | ·gabam |
| 2 pl. | gabthae | ·gabaid |
| 3 pl. | gabait | ·gabat |

| Person | Future | |
| Person | Absolute | Conjunct |
|---|---|---|
| 1 sg. | géba | ·géb |
| 2 sg. | (·)gébae | |
| 3 sg. | gébaid | ·géba |
| 1 pl. | gébmai | ·gébam |
| 2 pl. | gébthae | ·gébaid |
| 3 pl. | gébait | ·gébat |

| Person | Preterite | |
| Person | Absolute | Conjunct |
|---|---|---|
| 1 sg. | gabsu | ·gabus |
| 2 sg. | gabsai | ·gabais |
| 3 sg. | gabais | ·gab |
| 1 pl. | gabsaimmi | ·gabsam |
| 2 pl. | (unattested) | ·gabsaid |
| 3 pl. | gabsait | ·gaibset |

Verbs that have one or more prefixes, called "compound verbs", always take conjunct endings. In this case, stress generally falls on the syllable after the first prefix. Where only one prefix is present, that means stress falls on the verb root, but where two or more prefixes are present, stress then falls on the second prefix.

| No. of prefixes | Underlying form | Surface form | Gloss |
|---|---|---|---|
| 1 | /to- + gair/ (Note: The prefix to- becomes do- when unstressed.) | do·gair | "he summons" |
| 2 | /for- + com- + gair/ | for·congair | "he commands" |
| 3 | /to- + air- + com- + gair/ | do·airngir | "he promises" |

Because these verb forms are stressed on the second syllable, they are called deuterotonic (from Greek δεύτερος deuteros "second" + τόνος tonos "tone, stress"). As can be seen in the above examples, the phonological effects of stress placement can be significant; for example, when the prefix com- follows the stressed syllable, it is reduced to just n. These phonological changes become even more apparent when a conjunct particle like ní ("not") is added. In this case, stress shifts to the first prefix, which has phonological consequences for the rest of the verbal complex.

| No. of prefixes | Underlying form | Surface form | Gloss |
|---|---|---|---|
| 1 | /ní + to- + gair/ | ní·togair | "he doesn't summon" |
| 2 | /ní + for- + com- + gair/ | ní·forngair | "he doesn't command" |
| 3 | /ní + to- + air- + com- + gair/ | ní·tairngir | "he does not promise" |

Because these forms are stressed on the first syllable of the verb proper (i.e. the syllable after the particle), they are called prototonic (Greek πρῶτος prōtos "first", proto- prefix). The relationship between prototonic and deuterotonic compound verb forms is thus analogous to that between simple verb forms with conjunct and absolute endings: the one group is used after a conjunct particle like ní, the other group without such a particle.

| Without particle (independent) | With particle (dependent) | Gloss |
|---|---|---|
| gairid (abs.) | ní·gair (conj.) | "he calls/does not call" |
| do·gair (deut.) | ní·togair (prot.) | "he summons/does not summon" |
| do·airngir (deut.) | ní·tairngir (prot.) | "he promises/does not promise" |

The distinction between absolute and conjunct endings is believed to have originated with the placement of a particle *(e)s in Proto-Insular Celtic; see Insular Celtic languages#Absolute and dependent verb for discussion.

In addition to the above-mentioned forms, Old Irish also has one dependent verb form that is neither a regular conjunct form nor a prototonic form: the word fil functions in many cases as the dependent equivalent of at·tá "is", e.g. nicon·fil nach rainn "there is no part", where fil follows the conjunct particle nicon "not". This form survives in Modern Irish as fuil, in Gaelic as (bh)eil, and in Manx as nel/vel, all of which are used as the dependent equivalent of the verb for "is".

=== Scottish Gaelic ===
Scottish Gaelic retains traces of both the absolute/conjunct distinction and the deuterotonic/prototonic distinction. The absolute/conjunct distinction is retained in the habitual present tense (also used as, and often referred to as, the future tense) of regular and many irregular verbs. In these cases, the independent form of the verb ends in -(a)idh (cf. Old Irish gaibid above), while the dependent form drops this ending (cf. Old Irish ·gaib above). For example:

| Independent | Dependent | Gloss |
|---|---|---|
| glacaidh | glac | will grasp |
| òlaidh | òl | will drink |
| cluinnidh | cluinn | will hear |
| ruigidh | ruig | will reach |

In other irregular verbs, the independent/dependent distinction (found in both the habitual present and in the past) is inherited from the Old Irish deuterotonic/prototonic distinction. For example:

| Independent | Dependent | Gloss |
|---|---|---|
| chì | faic | will see |
| chunnaic | faca | saw |
| gheibh | faigh | will get |
| chaidh | deachaidh | went |

=== Manx ===
The situation in Manx is very similar to that in Scottish Gaelic. The future tense has the ending -ee in the independent form, which in many verbs is dropped in the dependent form. In addition, dependent forms undergo various initial mutations in Manx. For example:

| Independent | Dependent | Gloss |
|---|---|---|
| tilgee | dilg | will throw |
| faagee | n'aag / v'aag | will leave |
| eeee | n'ee | will eat |
| cluinnee | gluin | will hear |

In Manx too, remnants of the deuterotonic/prototonic distinction of Old Irish are found in the independent/dependent distinction in some irregular verbs, for example:

| Independent | Dependent | Gloss |
|---|---|---|
| va | row | was |
| nee | jean | will do |
| honnick | naik / vaik | saw |
| hie | jagh | went |

=== Irish ===
In Early Modern Irish, the absolute/conjunct distinction was on the wane. It was less thoroughgoing than in Old Irish, but more than in the modern languages. In the conjunct of the present tense, endingless forms like Old Irish ·gair (cf. Gaelic glac and Manx dilg above (Note: The future tense of Gaelic and Manx is derived from the Old Irish present.)) were gradually being replaced by forms with the ending -(e)ann. The distinction was found not only in the 3rd person singular, but also in the 1st and 3rd persons plural. Thus in Early Modern Irish, distinctions like the following were made:

| Independent | Dependent | Gloss |
|---|---|---|
| molaidh | mol / molann | praises |
| molmaoid | molam | we praise |
| molaid | molad | they praise |

The distinction was also found in the 1st and 3rd persons of the future tense:

| Independent | Dependent | Gloss |
|---|---|---|
| molfad | molabh | I will praise |
| molfaidh | molfa | s/he will praise |
| molfamaoid | molfam | we will praise |
| molfaid | molfad | they will praise |

In Modern Irish, all of these distinctions have been lost. Sometimes it is the independent form that was generalized (e.g. molfaidh "will praise"), sometimes the dependent form (e.g. molann "praises").

However, the deuterotonic/prototonic distinction is still found in many irregular verbs, for example:

| Independent | Dependent | Gloss |
|---|---|---|
| bhí | raibh | was |
| rinne | dearna | made |
| gheobhadh | faigheadh | would find |
| chonaic | faca | saw |
| chuaigh | deachaigh | went |

Irish has two types of relative clause: direct and indirect (see Irish syntax#Relative clauses for details). The distinction between them is shown firstly by the fact that the relative particle a triggers lenition of the following verb in direct relatives but eclipsis of the verb in indirect relatives, and secondly (where the distinction is made) it takes the independent form of the verb in direct relatives and the dependent form in indirect relatives. For example:

- an obair a bhí mé a dhéanamh "the work which I was doing" (direct relative; independent form)
- an fear a raibh a mhac san ospidéal "the man whose son was in the hospital (indirect relative; dependent form)

Irish also has two types of conditional clause, which are introduced by two different words for "if": má introduces realis clauses, and dá introduces irrealis clauses. Realis clauses indicate conditionals with a possible fulfillment (e.g. "if he is agreeable", which leaves open the possibility that he is), while irrealis clauses indicate purely hypothetical conditionals (e.g. "if it were a nice day", but it isn't). The realis particle má triggers lenition of the following verb and takes the independent form, while the irrealis particle dá triggers eclipsis and takes the dependent form. For example:

- má chonaic sí é "if she saw it" (realis; independent form)
- dá bhfaigheadh sí é "if she had found it" (irrealis; dependent form)

== Greek ==
In Greek, dependent verb forms only appear in non-past tense verbs. Morphologically, they are non-past perfective verbs, as opposed to the non-past imperfective verbs, which are independent. These forms of verbs are historically descendant from the Ancient Greek aorist subjunctive, and as such some linguists refer to them that way.

The most common usage of them is forming the subjunctive perfective mood, formed in Greek by the participle να (na). The participle can be used before independent forms, however this results in the imperfective mood instead.

| Mood | Example | Transliteration | Gloss |
|---|---|---|---|
| perfective subjunctive (using a dependent form) | Θέλω να το φάω. | Thélo na to pháo. | I want to eat it. |
| imperfective subjunctive (using an independent form) | Θέλω να το τρώω. | Thélo na to tróo. | I want to be eating it. |

Another common usage is to form the future simple tense by using the particle θα (tha). Similar to να (na), using an independent non-past form will result in the future continuous tense instead.

| Tense | Example | Transliteration | Gloss |
|---|---|---|---|
| future simple (using a dependent form) | Θα το δω. | Tha to tho. | I will see it. |
| future continuous (using an independent form) | Θα το βλέπω. | Tha to vlépo. | I will be watching it. |
