= Irish grammar =

Grammar of the Irish language

The morphology of Irish is in some respects typical of an Indo-European language. Nouns are declined for number and case, and verbs for person and number. Nouns are classified by masculine or feminine gender. Other aspects of Irish morphology, while typical for an Insular Celtic language, are not typical for Indo-European, such as the presence of inflected prepositions and the initial consonant mutations. Irish syntax is also rather different from that of most Indo-European languages, due to its use of the verb–subject–object word order.

== Syntax ==
Word order in Irish is of the form VSO (verb–subject–object) so that, for example, "He hit me" is Bhuail [hit-past tense] sé [he] mé [me].

One distinctive aspect of Irish is the distinction between is, the copula (known in Irish as an chopail), and tá. Is describes identity or quality in a permanent sense, while temporary aspects are described by tá. This is similar to the difference between the verbs ser and estar in Spanish and Portuguese (see Romance copula), although this is not an exact match; is and tá are cognate respectively with the Spanish es and está.

Examples are:

- Is fear é. "He is a man." (Spanish Es un hombre, Portuguese (Ele) é um homem)
- Is duine fuar é. "He is cold (a cold-hearted person)." (Spanish Es frío, Portuguese (Ele) é frio)
- Tá sé/Tomás fuar. "He/Thomas is cold" (= feels cold) (Alt. Tá fuacht air [= "Cold is on him"]). (Spanish Tiene frío – in this case Spanish uses tener (to have) instead of estar (to be), Portuguese (Ele) está com frio)
- Tá sé ina chodladh. "He is asleep." (Spanish Él está durmiendo, Portuguese Ele está dormindo/Ele está a dormir)
- Is duine maith é. "He is good (a good person)." (Spanish Es bueno, Portuguese (Ele) é bom)
- Tá sé go maith. "He is well." (Spanish Está bien, Portuguese (Ele) está bem)

== Nouns ==
Irish is an inflected language, having four cases: ainmneach (nominative and accusative), gairmeach (vocative), ginideach (genitive) and tabharthach (prepositional). The prepositional case is called the dative by convention.

Irish nouns are masculine or feminine. To a certain degree the gender difference is indicated by specific word endings, -án and -ín being masculine and -óg feminine. While the neuter has mostly disappeared from vocabulary, the neuter gender is seen in various place names in Ireland.

== Articles ==
Irish definite article
Definite article	Singular		Plural
Definite article	Masculine	Feminine	Plural
Nominative	an^{T}	an^{L}	na^{H}
Genitive	an^{L}	na^{H}	na^{E}
Dative	an^{1}	an^{2}	na^{H}

The Irish definite article has two forms: an and na. An may cause lenition, eclipsis, or neither. Na may cause eclipsis, but the only instance of lenition with na is with the genitive singular of the word céad meaning first. An is used in the common case singular for all nouns, and lenites feminine nouns. In the genitive singular, an with lenition is used with masculine nouns, na with feminine nouns. In the dative singular, an may cause lenition or eclipsis depending on the preposition preceding it and on regional norms (in Ulster usage, lenition is standard with all prepositions, while in other regions eclipsis is used with many). Na is the only plural form of the article; it causes eclipsis in the genitive for both genders, and no mutation in other cases.

Names of countries usually take the definite article in the nominative: An Fhrainc "France", an Bhrasaíl "Brazil", an tSeapáin "Japan". Exceptions to this include Éire "Ireland", Albain "Scotland" and Sasana "England".

There is no indefinite article in Irish; the word appears by itself, for example: Tá peann agam. – "I have a pen", Tá madra sa seomra. – "There's a dog in the room".

When two definite noun phrases appear as part of a genitive construction (equivalent to the X of the Y in English), only the noun phrase in the genitive takes the article. Compare Áras an Uachtaráin or Teitheamh na nIarlaí to English the residence of the President, the flight of the Earls.

== Adjectives ==
Irish adjectives always follow the noun. The adjective is influenced by the case, number and gender of the noun preceding it.

- An cailín beag "The small girl" – masculine singular nominative
- An bhean bhocht "The poor woman" – feminine singular nominative
- Na buachaillí óga "The young boys" – masculine plural nominative

Adjectives in Irish have two morphological degrees of comparison: the positive (Irish: bunchéim), e.g. Tá an buachaill cairdiúil "the boy is friendly", and the comparative (breischéim), e.g. Tá an cailín níos cairdiúla ná an buachaill "the girl is nicer than the boy". A superlative (sárchéim) sense is rendered by the comparative in a relative clause, e.g. Is é Seán an páiste is cairdiúla den triúr "Seán is the nicest child of the three".

== Adverbs ==
Irish adverbs are used to modify verbs, adjectives and other adverbs.

An adverb can be created from an adjective by adding go before it, e.g. go mall, go tapaidh, go maith, etc. If the adjective begins with a vowel, ⟨h⟩ is added before it, e.g. go hálainn, go híseal, go háirithe, etc.

Adverbs can often be created from nouns by putting a preposition before them, e.g. ar bith, de ghnáth, faoi dheireadh, etc.

Other categories of adverbs include the following:

Adverbs that describe relation to time, e.g. uaireanta, anois, cheana, etc.

Adverbs that describe relation to place, e.g. ann, abhaile, amuigh, etc.

Adverbs used in questions, e.g. cathain?, conas?, cá?, etc.

Adverbs used for negation, e.g. ní, nach, nár, etc.

Other adverbs, e.g. áfach, chomh maith, ach oiread, etc.

== Verbs ==
There are two conjugations and 11 irregular verbs. Tenses or moods are formed by inflecting the stem, and in the past and habitual past tenses and the conditional mood also by leniting any initial consonant. The inflected tense and mood forms are: present indicative, present habitual indicative (differs from present only in the verb bí "to be"), future, past indicative, past habitual indicative, conditional, imperative, present subjunctive, and past subjunctive. Verbs also have a verbal noun and past participle, and progressive constructions similar to those using the English present participle may be formed from the verbal noun and an appropriate tense of bí. Examples of tense conjugations: (all third person forms without subject pronoun):

- 1st conjugation: Fág "to leave" – d'fhág (past) – fágann (present) – fágfaidh (future) – d'fhágfadh (conditional) – d'fhágadh (habitual past) – fága (subjunctive) – fágadh (imperative)
- 2nd conjugation: Ceannaigh "to buy" – cheannaigh (past) – ceannaíonn (present) – ceannóidh (future) – cheannódh (conditional) – cheannaíodh (habitual past) – ceannaí (subjunctive) – ceannaíodh (imperative)
- Irregular: Téigh "to go" – chuaigh (past) – téann (present) – rachaidh (future) – rachadh (conditional) – théadh (habitual past) – té (subjunctive) – téadh (imperative)

In addition to the passive voice, there is the impersonal form of the verb, termed the saorbhriathar or "autonomous verb", which serves a similar function (the most literal translation is "You/One/They...[e.g. say, are, do]").

Verbs can be conjugated either synthetically (with the personal pronoun included in the verb inflection) or analytically (with the verb inflected for tense only and a separate subject). However, the official standard generally prescribes the analytic form in most person-tense combinations, and the synthetic in only some cases, such as the first person plural. The analytic forms are also generally preferred in the western and northern dialects, except in answer to what would in English be "yes/no" questions, while Munster Irish prefers the synthetic forms. For example, the following are the standard form, synthetic form and analytical form of the past tense of rith "to run":

Person	Standard	Synthetic	Analytic
1st sing	rith mé	ritheas	rith mé
2nd sing	rith tú	rithis	rith tú
3rd sing	rith sé	rith	rith sé
1st plural	ritheamar	ritheamar	rith sinn / rith muid
2nd plural	rith sibh	ritheabhar	rith sibh
3rd plural	rith siad	ritheadar	rith siad
Impersonal	ritheadh	ritheadh	ritheadh

== Pronouns ==
=== Personal pronouns ===
Personal pronouns in Irish do not inflect for case, but there are three different sets of pronouns used: conjunctive forms, disjunctive forms, and emphatic forms (which may be used either conjunctively or disjunctively)

Irish personal pronouns
Simple pronouns		Singular		Plural	
Simple pronouns		Conjunctive	Disjunctive	Conjunctive	Disjunctive
1st person		mé		(muid)	muid, sinn
2nd person		tú	thú	sibh	
3rd person	Masculine	sé	é	siad	iad
3rd person	Feminine	sí	í	siad	iad
Intensive pronouns		Singular		Plural	
Intensive pronouns		Conjunctive	Disjunctive	Conjunctive	Disjunctive
1st person		mise		muidne, sinne	
2nd person		tusa	thusa	sibhse	
3rd person	Masculine	seisean	eisean	siadsan	iadsan
3rd person	Feminine	sise	ise	siadsan	iadsan

==== Conjunctive forms ====
The normal word order in Irish is verb–subject–object (VSO). The forms of the subject pronoun directly following the verb are called conjunctive.

The form muid in the 1st person plural has only recently been approved for use in the official standard, but is very common in western and northern dialects. The standard and southern dialects have no subject pronoun in the 1st person plural, using the synthetic verb ending -imíd (alternatively -imid) instead.

Irish has no T–V distinction, i.e. it does not differentiate between formal and familiar forms of second person pronouns. The difference between tú and sibh is purely one of number.

There is no equivalent to the English "it". Either sé or sí are used depending on whether the thing the speaker is referring to is a masculine noun or a feminine noun. The exception is the pronoun ea, used in impersonal copula phrases, particularly in the phrases is ea (> sea) "yes", "so", "that is so", ní hea (the opposite of is ea), nach ea? "is that not so?", an ea (Kerry am b'ea) "Is that so?", fear is ea é "it's a man", and so on.

==== Disjunctive forms ====
If a pronoun is not the subject or if a subject pronoun does not follow the verb (as in a verbless clause, or as the subject of the copula, where the pronoun stands at the end of the sentence), the so-called disjunctive forms are used:

In Munster dialects the form thú is either (a) archaic (replaced by tú) or (b) is only found after words ending in a vowel.

Standard
Buailim thú ("I hit you", present tense), Bhuail mé thú ("I hit you", past tense)
Dialect type (a)
Buailim tú, Bhuail mé tú
Dialect type (b)
Buailim tú, Bhuail mé thú

==== Intensive forms ====
Irish also has intensive pronouns, used to give the pronouns a bit more weight or emphasis.

The word féin (/heːnʲ/ or /fʲeːnʲ/) "-self" can follow a pronoun, either to add emphasis or to form a reflexive pronoun.

Rinne mé féin é. "I did it myself."
Ar ghortaigh tú thú féin? "Did you hurt yourself?"
Sinn Féin is thus "We Ourselves"

=== Prepositional pronouns ===
As the object of a preposition, a pronoun is fused with the preposition; one speaks here of "inflected" prepositions, or, as they are more commonly termed, prepositional pronouns.

Irish prepositional pronouns
Prepositional pronouns		Singular				Plural		
Prepositional pronouns		1st person	2nd person	3rd person		1st person	2nd person	3rd person
Prepositional pronouns		1st person	2nd person	Masculine	Feminine	1st person	2nd person	3rd person
ag "at"	Simple	agam	agat	aige	aici	againn	agaibh	acu
ag "at"	Emphatic	agamsa	agatsa	aigesean	aicise	againne	agaibhse	acusan
ar "on"	Simple	orm	ort	air	uirthi	orainn	oraibh	orthu
ar "on"	Emphatic	ormsa	ortsa	airsean	uirthise	orainne	oraibhse	orthusan
as "from, out of"	Simple	asam	asat	as	aisti	asainn	asaibh	astu
as "from, out of"	Emphatic	asamsa	asatsa	as-san	aistise	asainne	asaibhse	astusan
chuig/ chun "to(wards)"	Simple	chugam	chugat	chuige	chuici	chugainn	chugaibh	chucu
chuig/ chun "to(wards)"	Emphatic	chugamsa	chugatsa	chuigesean	chuicise	chugainne	chugaibhse	chucusan
de "of, from"	Simple	díom	díot	de	di	dínn	díbh	díobh
de "of, from"	Emphatic	díomsa	díotsa	desean	dise	dínne	díbhse	díobhsan
do "to, for"	Simple	dom	duit	dó	di	dúinn	daoibh	dóibh
do "to, for"	Emphatic	domsa	duitse	dósan	dise	dúinne	daoibhse	dóibhsean
faoi "about, under"	Simple	fúm	fút	faoi	fúithi	fúinn	fúibh	fúthu
faoi "about, under"	Emphatic	fúmsa	fútsa	faoisean	fúithise	fúinne	fúibhse	fúthusan
i "in"	Simple	ionam	ionat	ann	inti	ionainn	ionaibh	iontu
i "in"	Emphatic	ionamsa	ionatsa	annsan	intise	ionainne	ionaibhse	iontusan
idir "between"	Simple	—				eadrainn	eadraibh	eatarthu
idir "between"	Emphatic	—				eadrainne	eadraibhse	eatarthusan
le "with"	Simple	liom	leat	leis	léi	linn	libh	leo
le "with"	Emphatic	liomsa	leatsa	leisean	léise	linne	libhse	leosan
ó "since"	Simple	uaim	uait	uaidh	uaithi	uainn	uaibh	uathu
ó "since"	Emphatic	uaimse	uaitse	uaidhsean	uaithise	uainne	uaibhse	uathusan
roimh "before, in front of"	Simple	romham	romhat	roimhe	roimpi	romhainn	romhaibh	rompu
roimh "before, in front of"	Emphatic	romhamsa	romhatsa	roimhesean	roimpise	romhainne	romhaibhse	rompusan
thar "over, beyond, past"	Simple	tharam	tharat	thairis	thairsti	tharainn	tharaibh	tharstu
thar "over, beyond, past"	Emphatic	tharamsa	tharatsa	thairisean	thairstise	tharainne	tharaibhse	tharstusan
trí "through"	Simple	tríom	tríot	tríd	tríthi	trínn	tríbh	tríothu
trí "through"	Emphatic	tríomsa	tríotsa	trídsean	tríthise	trínne	tríbhse	tríothusan
um "around"	Simple	umam	umat	uime	uimpi	umainn	umaibh	umpu
um "around"	Emphatic	umamsa	umatsa	uimesean	uimpise	umainne	umaibhse	umpusan

=== Possessive pronouns ===
The possessive determiners cause different initial consonant mutations.

Irish possessive pronoun
Possessive determiners		Singular	Plural
1st person		mo/ m'^{L}	ár^{E}
2nd person		do/ d', t'^{L}	bhur^{E}
3rd person	Masculine	a^{L}	a^{E}
3rd person	Feminine	a^{H}	a^{E}

Notes

1. ^{L}= causes lenition on the next word.
2. ^{H}= adds h- to the next vowel sound.
3. ^{E}= causes eclipsis of the next word.

These forms (especially a and ár) can also blend with certain prepositions:

Irish possessive pronoun contractions
Preposition	Possessive pronoun			
Preposition	mo/ m' "my"	do/ d' "your"	a "his, her(s), their(s)"	ár "our(s)"
de "from"	dem	ded, det	dá	dár
do "to, for"	dom	dod, dot	dá	dár
faoi "about, under"	—	—	faoina	faoinár
i "in"	im	id, it	ina	inár
le "with"	lem	led, let	lena	lenár
ó "from"	óm	ód, ót	óna	ónár
trí "through"	—	—	trína	trínár

The object of a verbal noun is in the genitive case:

- Tá sé ag plé a rothair. "He's discussing his bicycle" (lit.: He is at the discussing of his bicycle)

Similarly, if the object of the verbal noun is a pronoun, then it is a possessive pronoun:

- Tá sé á phlé. "He's discussing it." (lit.: He is at its (i.e. the bicycle's) discussing)

More examples:

- Tá sí do mo bhualadh. "She's hitting me."
- Tá siad do do phlé. "They are discussing you."
- Tá sé á pógadh. "He's kissing her."
- Tá tú dár mbualadh. "You're hitting us."
- Tá mé do bhur bplé. "I'm discussing you (pl.)."
- Tá sibh á bpógadh. "You (pl.) are kissing them."

=== Interrogative pronouns ===
Interrogative pronouns introduce a question, e.g. the words who, what, which. The Irish equivalents are:

- cé "who?, which?"
- cad or céard "what?"
- cén "which?"

Examples:

- Cé a rinne é? "Who did it?"
- Cé a chonaic tú? "Who did you see?"
- Cé ar thug tú an leabhar dó? "Who did you give the book to?"
- Cad atá ort? "What's wrong (with you)?" (lit. "What is on you?")
- Céard a dúirt tú? "What did you say?"
- Cén t-ainm atá ort? "What's your name?" (lit. "Which name is upon you?")
- Cén aois tú? "How old are you?" (lit. "Which age are you?")

== Numbers ==
Irish numbers
Value	Cardinal			Ordinal
Value	Disjunctive	Conjunctive		Ordinal
Value	Disjunctive	Nonhuman	Human	Ordinal
0	náid			
1	a haon	(aon)...amháin		céad
2	a dó	dhá	beirt	dara
3	a trí	trí	triúr	tríú
4	a ceathair	ceithre	ceathrar	ceathrú
5	a cúig	cúig	cúigear	cúigiú
6	a sé	sé	seisear	séú
7	a seacht	seacht	seachtar	seachtú
8	a hocht	ocht	ochtar	ochtú
9	a naoi	naoi	naonúr	naoú
10	a deich	deich	deichniúr	deichiú
11	a haon déag	aon...déag		aonú...déag
12	a dó dhéag	dhá...déag	dáréag	dóú...déag
20	fiche			fichiú
21	fiche a haon	...'s fiche		aonú...'s fiche
22	fiche a dó	dhá ...'s fiche		dóú...'s fiche
30	tríocha			tríochadú
40	daichead			daicheadú
50	caoga			caogadú
60	seasca			seascadú
70	seachtó			seachtódú
80	ochtó			ochtódú
90	nócha			nóchadú
100	céad			céadú
1000	míle			míliú

There are three kinds of cardinal numbers in Irish: disjunctive numbers, nonhuman conjunctive numbers, and human conjunctive numbers.

=== Disjunctive numbers ===
Disjunctive numbers are used for example in arithmetic, in telling time, in telephone numbers and after nouns in forms like bus a trí déag "bus 13" or seomra a dó "room 2".

=== Conjunctive numbers ===
==== Nonhuman conjunctive numbers ====
Nonhuman conjunctive numbers are used to count nouns that do not refer to human beings, e.g. capall "horse"

"One" as a pronoun is rendered with ceann (lit. "head") when it concerns things and animals, e.g.:

Tá cúig chapall agam; tá ceann acu breoite. "I have five horses; one of them is sick."

==== Human conjunctive numbers ====
Human conjunctive numbers are used to count nouns that refer to human beings, e.g. páiste 'child'

"One" as a pronoun is rendered with duine (lit. "person") with people. The other "personal" numbers can also be used pronominally, e.g.:

Tá cúigear páistí agam; tá duine acu breoite. "I have five children; one of them is sick."
Tá seisear sa seomra. "Six people are in the room."

Higher numbers are done as with the nonhuman conjunctive numbers: trí pháiste déag, fiche páiste, etc.

== Phonology ==
A notable feature of Irish phonology is that consonants (except /h/) come in pairs, one "broad" (velarized, pronounced with the back of the tongue pulled back towards the soft palate) and one "slender" (palatalized, pronounced with the middle of the tongue pushed up towards the hard palate).

Consonant phonemes
		Labial					Coronal				Dorsal		Glottal
		Bilabial		Labio- velar	Labio- dental		Dental	Alveolar		Post- alveolar	Palatal	Velar	Glottal
		broad	slender	broad	broad	slender	broad	broad	slender	slender	slender	broad	Glottal
Plosives	voiceless	pˠ	pʲ				t̪ˠ			tʲ	c	k	
Plosives	voiced	bˠ	bʲ				d̪ˠ			dʲ	ɟ	ɡ	
Fricative/ Approximant	voiceless				fˠ	fʲ		sˠ		ʃ	ç	x	h
Fricative/ Approximant	voiced			w		vʲ					j	ɣ	
Nasal		mˠ	mʲ				n̪ˠ		nʲ		ɲ	ŋ	
Tap								ɾˠ	ɾʲ				
Lateral							l̪ˠ		lʲ				

Vowel phonemes
	Front	Central	Back
Close	iː		uː
Near-close	ɪ		ʊ
Close-mid	eː		oː
Mid		ə (only unstressed)	
Open-mid	ɛ		ɔ
Open	a		ɑː

Diphthongs: /iə/, /uə/, /əi/, /əu/.
