= Irish initial mutations =

Word initial consonantal sound changes in Irish

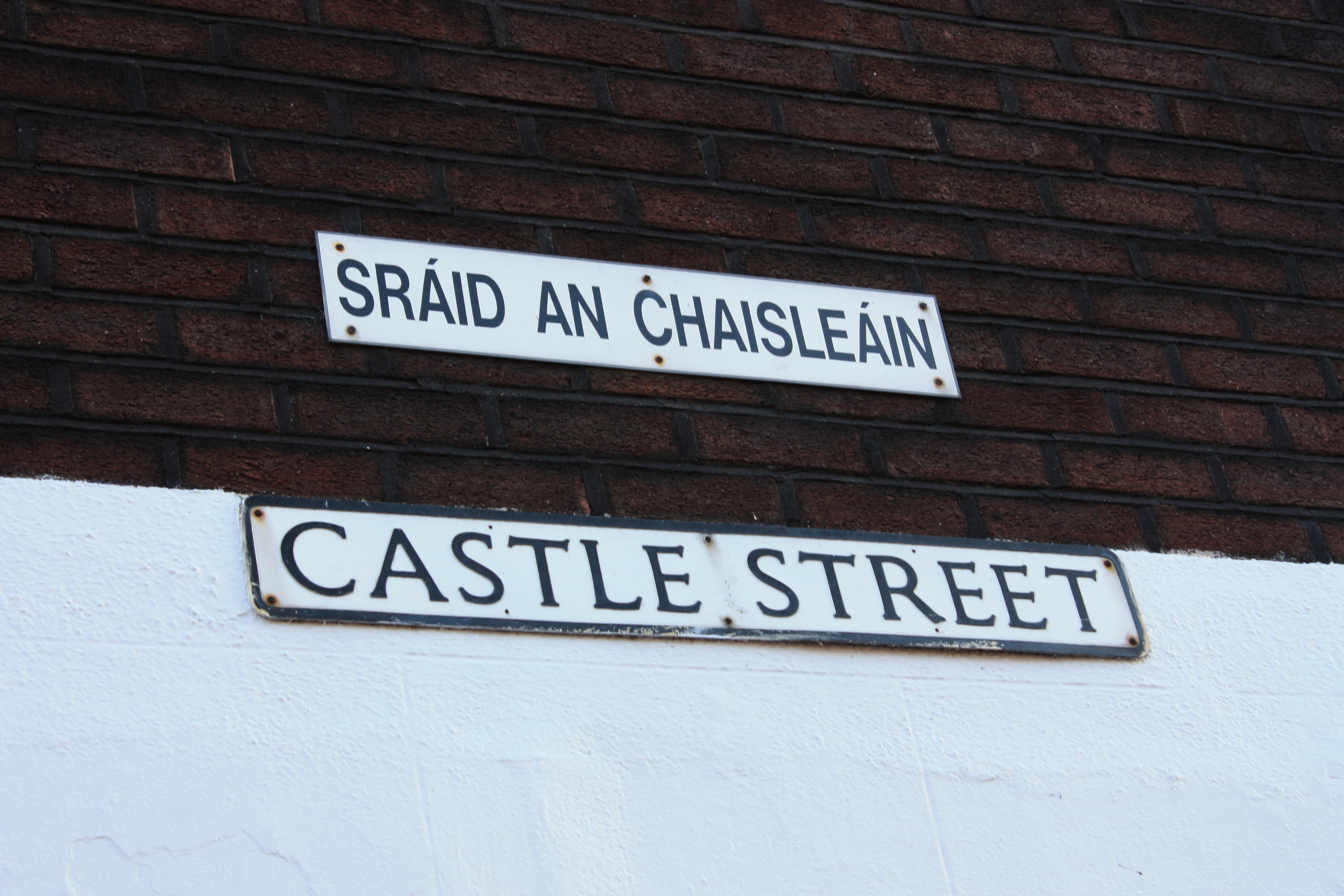
An Irish language sign which displays an inflected form of the word Caisleán "castle" with a mutated ⟨c⟩.

Irish, like all modern Celtic languages, is characterised by its initial consonant mutations. These mutations affect the initial consonant of a word under specific morphological and syntactic conditions. The mutations are an important tool in understanding the relationship between two words and can differentiate various meanings.

Irish, like Scottish Gaelic and Manx, features two initial consonant mutations: lenition (Irish: séimhiú [ˈʃeːvʲuː]) and eclipsis (urú [ˈʊɾˠuː]) (the alternative names, aspiration for lenition and nasalisation for eclipsis, are also used, but those terms are misleading).

Originally these mutations were phonologically governed by external sandhi effects: lenition was caused by a consonant being between two vowels, and eclipsis when a nasal preceded an obstruent, including at the beginning of a word.

Irish also features t-prothesis and h-prothesis, related phenomena which affect vowel-initial words.

See Irish phonology for a discussion of the symbols used on this page.

== Historical development ==
=== Lenition ===
Lenition as an initial mutation originally stems from the historical allophonic lenition of an intervocalic consonant, both word internally and across word boundaries, i.e if a word ended in a vowel and the next word began with a consonant + a vowel, the consonant lenited.

Today, these former final vowels are usually elided, but the lenition of following consonants remains and has been grammaticised. For example, Proto-Celtic *esyo "his" caused the lenition of a following consonant due to its final vowel and its modern form a now causes lenition, keeping it distinct from a "her" and a "their", which cause h-prothesis and eclipsis respectively.

Lenition caused stops and *m to become fricatives, *s to debuccalise to [h], *f to elide, and the liquids *l, *n, *r to split into fortis and lenis variants. Though by the end of the Middle Irish period lenited *m largely lost its nasal quality, lenited *t debuccalised to [h], and lenited *d lost its coronal articulation.

Lenition did not only occur word initially, though non-initial lenition was never grammaticised. For example Proto-Celtic *knāmis → cnáim → cnáimh "bone", and *abalnā → aball → abhaill "apple tree".

==== Prothetic ⟨t⟩- and ⟨h⟩- ====
While it is not initially apparent, the prothesis of ⟨t⟩ and ⟨h⟩ stems from historical lenition combined with vowel reduction.

The prosthetic ⟨t⟩- of vowel initial words is a fossilised fragment of the Proto-Celtic masculine definite article *sindos. Before vowels, the *s of the ending *-os was lenited to [h], which (combined with the loss of the *-o-) devoiced the preceding *-d- to *-t.

- i.e. *sindos [sindoh] → int → an t-).

The prosthetic ⟨t⟩ of ⟨s⟩ initial words is a fossilised fragment of the d of Proto-Celtic nominative feminine definite article *sindā and masculine genitive definite article *sindī. Since they ended in vowels, a following word initial *s was lenited to [h] which (combined with the loss of the *-ā, *-ī) devoiced the preceding *-d to *-t.

- i.e. *sindā sūli [sindaː huːli] → int ṡúil → an tsúil)

The prothetic ⟨h⟩ of vowel initial words has two origins, the first being epenthetic to avoid vowel hiatus, and the second being the fossilised remnant of a historic consonant. For example, the *s of Proto-Celtic *esyās "her" was lenited between vowels to [h]. Overtime *esyās was reduced to a but the [h] remains when it is followed by a vowel initial word but is now written as part of the following word.

=== Eclipsis ===
Eclipsis originally stems from the historical coalescence of consonant clusters beginning with a nasal, both word internally and across word boundaries, i.e if a word ended in a nasal and the next word began with a stop or labial fricative, they would coalesce.

Today, many of the former final nasals have been elided, but still have an effect on the pronunciation of a following consonant, which has been grammaticised. For example, the Proto-Celtic genitive plural of the definite article *sindoisom has lost its final nasal and been reduced to na but it now causes the eclipsis of a following consonant or the prothesis of ⟨n-⟩ to a vowel.

The cluster reductions involved in eclipsis turned nasals followed by a voiced stop into nasals, nasals followed by a voiceless stop into voiced stops, nasals followed by a voiceless labial fricative into voiced fricatives, and words which have lost their final nasal add an ⟨n-⟩ to vowel-initial words.

These cluster reductions did not only occur word-initially, though non-initial coalescence was never grammaticised. For example, Proto-Celtic *lindos → lind → linn "pool", and *kʷenkʷe → cóic → cúig "five".

== Summary table ==
This table shows the orthographical and phonological effects of lenition, eclipsis, h-prothesis, and t-prothesis. Vowels are represented by ⟨v⟩ and /V/. Consonants are broad before ⟨a, á, o, ó, u, ú⟩ and slender before ⟨e, é, i, í⟩. See also Irish orthography which has a table showing non-initial lenited consonants which elided or vocalised to form diphthongs or long vowels.

Unmutated			Lenition			Eclipsis			T-Prothesis			H-Prothesis			Meaning
Spell.	IPA	E.G.	Spell.	IPA	E.G.	Spell.	IPA	E.G.	Spell.	IPA	E.G.	Spell.	IPA	E.G.	Meaning
V v	/V/	éan /eːnˠ/	—N/a			nV n-v	/n̪ˠV/ /n̠ʲV/	n-éan /n̠ʲeːnˠ/	tV t-v	/t̪ˠV/ /tʲV/	t-éan /tʲeːnˠ/	hV hv	/hV/	héan /heːnˠ/	bird
B b	/bˠ/ /bʲ/	bean /bʲanˠ/	Bh bh	/w/ /vʲ/	bhean /vʲanˠ/	mB mb	/mˠ/ /mʲ/	mbean /mʲanˠ/	—N/a			—N/a			woman
C c	/k/ /c/	ceann /caːn̪ˠ/	Ch ch	/x/ /ç/	cheann /çaːn̪ˠ/	gC gc	/ɡ/ /ɟ/	gceann /ɟaːn̪ˠ/	—N/a			—N/a			head
D d	/d̪ˠ/ /dʲ/	droim /d̪ˠɾˠiːmʲ/	Dh dh	/ɣ/ /j/	dhroim /ɣɾˠiːmʲ/	nD nd	/n̪ˠ/ /n̠ʲ/	ndroim /n̪ˠɾˠiːmʲ/	—N/a			—N/a			back
F f	/fˠ/ /fʲ/	freagra /fʲɾʲaɡɾˠə/	Fh fh	∅	fhreagra /ɾʲaɡɾˠə/	bhF bhf	/w/ /vʲ/	bhfreagra /vʲɾʲaɡɾˠə/	—N/a			—N/a			answer
G g	/ɡ/ /ɟ/	glúin /gl̪ˠuːnʲ/	Gh gh	/ɣ/ /j/	ghlúin /ɣl̪ˠuːnʲ/	nG ng	/ŋ/ /ɲ/	nglúin /ŋl̪ˠuːnʲ/	—N/a			—N/a			knee
L l	/l̪ˠ/ /l̠ʲ/	leanbh /l̠ʲanˠəw/	L l	*/lˠ/ */lʲ/	leanbh /lʲanˠəw/	—N/a			—N/a			—N/a			baby
M m	/mˠ/ /mʲ/	máthair /mˠaːhəɾʲ/	Mh mh	/w/ /vʲ/	mháthair /waːhəɾʲ/	—N/a			—N/a			—N/a			mother
N n	/n̪ˠ/ /n̠ʲ/	naomh /n̪ˠiːw/	N n	*/nˠ/ */nʲ/	naomh /nˠiːw/	—N/a			—N/a			—N/a			saint
P p	/pˠ/ /pʲ/	peann /pʲaːn̪ˠ/	Ph ph	/fˠ/ /fʲ/	pheann /fʲaːn̪ˠ/	bP bp	/bˠ/ /bʲ/	bpeann /bʲaːn̪ˠ/	—N/a			—N/a			pen
S s	/sˠ/ /ʃ/	súil /sˠuːlʲ/	Sh sh	/h/	shúil /huːlʲ/	—N/a			tS ts	/t̪ˠ/ /tʲ/	tsúil /t̪ˠuːlʲ/	—N/a			eye
T t	/t̪ˠ/ /tʲ/	teach /tʲax/	Th th	/h/	theach /hax/	dT dt	/d̪ˠ/ /dʲ/	dteach /dʲax/	—N/a			—N/a			house

* Not all dialects contrast lenited ⟨l⟩ and ⟨n⟩ from their unlenited forms. See Irish Phonology#Fortis and lenis sonorants.

== Environments of lenition ==
=== After proclitics ===
==== After the definite article ====
The definite article triggers the lenition of:

1. a feminine noun in the nominative singular
  an bhean "the woman"
2. a masculine noun in the genitive singular
  an fhir "of the man" e.g. carr an fhir, the man's car (car of the man)
3. a noun in the dative singular, when the article follows one of the prepositions de "from", do "to" or i "in"
  do + an = don: don fhear "to the man"
  de + an = den: den bhean "from the woman"
  i + an = sa(n): sa chrann "in the tree"; san fhómhar "in the autumn"

Lenition is blocked when a coronal consonant is preceded by an.

an deoch "the drink", although deoch is feminine nominative singular
an tí "of the house", although tí is masculine genitive singular

Instead of leniting to /h/, after the definite article, /sˠ, ʃ/ become /t̪ˠ, tʲ/ (written ⟨ts⟩):

an tsúil /ən̪ˠ t̪ˠuːlʲ/ "the eye" (fem. nom. sg.)
an tsaoil /ən̪ˠ t̪ˠiːlʲ/ "of the world" (masc. gen. sg.)

==== After the vocative particle a ====
- a Bhríd "Bríd!"
- a Sheáin "Seán!"
- a chairde "my friends!"

==== After possessive pronouns ====
The possessive pronouns that trigger lenition are mo "my", do "your (sg.)", a "his"

- mo mhac "my son"
- do theach "your house"
- a pheann "his pen"

==== After certain prepositions ====
- de chrann "out of a tree"
- faoi chrann "under a tree"
- mar dhuine "as a person"
- ó Chorcaigh "from Cork"
- roimh mhaidin "before morning"
- trí shioc agus shneachta "through frost and snow"
- um Cháisc "at Easter"
- idir fhir agus mhná "both men and women"
- ar bhord "on a table"
- do chrann "to a tree"
- thar chrann "over a tree"

==== After the preterite/conditional of the copula ====
- Ba dhuine mór é. "He was a big person."
- Ba dheas uait é. "That was nice of you."

==== After the preterite preverbal particles ====
- Níor mhúinteoir é. "He was not a teacher."
- Níor thug mé "I didn't give"
- Ar shagart é? "Was he a priest?"
- Ar tháinig sé? "Did he come?"

==== After certain preverbal particles ====
- ní thuigim "I don't understand"
- má thagann sé "if he comes"
- an fear a thabharfaidh dom é "the man who will give it to me"

==== A verb in the preterite, imperfect or conditional ====
These were originally preceded by the particle do and often still are in Munster.

- bhris mé "I broke"
- bhrisinn "I used to break"
- bhrisfinn "I would break"

=== In modifier + head constructions ===
Lenition is blocked in these constructions if two coronals are adjacent.

==== After certain numbers ====
The singular form is used after numbers and is lenited in the following cases:

- aon bhó amháin "one cow"
- an chéad bhliain "the first year"
- dhá theach "two houses"
- beirt fhear "two men"
- trí bhád "three boats"
- ceithre bhó "four cows"
- cúig phunt "five pounds"
- sé mhí "six months"

==== After preposed adjectives ====
Constructions of adjective + noun are written as compounds.

- seanbhean "old woman"
- drochdhuine "bad person"
- dea-sheirbhís "good deed"
- nuatheanga "modern language"
- tréanmhuir "stormy sea"
- fíorchneas "true skin"
- ardbhrú "high pressure"
- ógfhear "young man"

==== After most prefixes ====
- an-bheag "very small"
- róbheag "too small"
- aisghabháil "retake"
- athbhliain "new year"
- dobhréagnaithe "undeniable"
- fochupán "saucer"
- forbhríste "overalls"
- idirchreidmheach "interconfessional"
- ilphósadh "polygamy"
- leasmháthair "stepmother"
- míshásta "unhappy"
- neamhchodladh "insomnia"
- príomhchathair "capital city"
- sobhriste "fragile"

==== The second part of a compound ====
- ainmfhocal "noun" (lit. "name word")
- dúghorm "dark blue"
- státfhiach "national debt"

=== In head + modifier constructions ===
In these constructions coronals are lenited even following other

- aimsir bháistí "rainy weather" (lenition after a feminine singular noun)
- buidéil shú "bottles of juice" (lenition after a plural ending in a slender consonant)
- teach Sheáin "Seán's house" (lenition of a definite noun in the genitive)

==== Postposed adjectives in certain circumstances ====
- bean dheas "a pretty woman" (lenition after a feminine singular noun)
- na fir mhóra "the big men" (lenition after a plural noun ending in a slender consonant)
- ainm an fhir bhig "the name of the small man" (lenition after a masculine singular noun in the genitive)
- sa chrann mhór "in the big tree" (lenition after a noun lenited by virtue of being in the dative after den, don, or sa(n))

== Environments of eclipsis ==
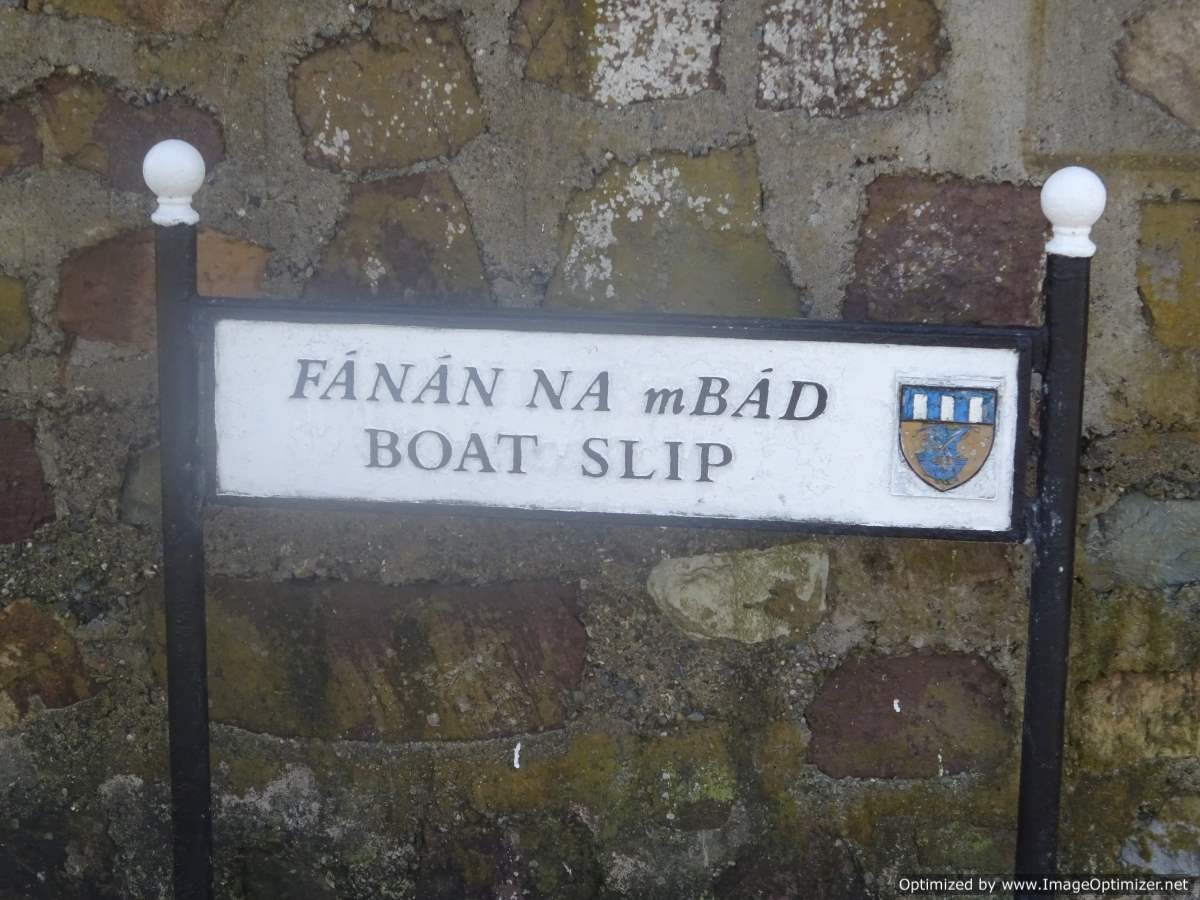
Eclipsis displayed on a sign in Tramore: Fánán na mBád "slip of the boats". Even in an all-caps, the eclipsed letter is not capitalised.

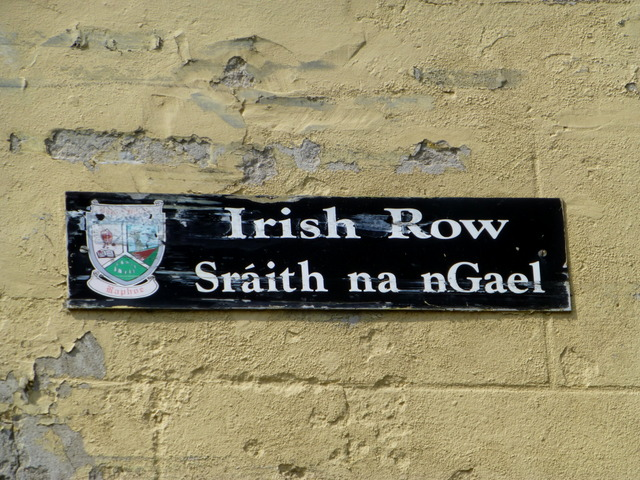
Eclipsis displayed on a sign in Raphoe: Sráith na nGael "Row of the Gaels".

=== After plural possessive pronouns ===
The possessive pronouns that trigger eclipsis are ár "our", bhur "your (pl.)", a "their"

- ár gcairde "our friends"
- bhur bpáistí "your (pl.) children"
- a mbád "their boat",

a can mean "his", "her" or "their", but these different uses can still be distinguished, since a causes lenition when used as "his" (a bhád), causes eclipsis when used as "their" (a mbád), and neither when used as "her" (a bád).

=== After certain numbers ===
The numbers that trigger eclipsis (the noun being in the singular) are:

- seacht gcapall "seven horses"
- ocht n-asal "eight donkeys"
- naoi gcat "nine cats"
- deich bpeann "ten pens"

=== After the preposition i "in" ===
Before a vowel in is written instead of i n-.

- i dteach "in a house"
- in Éirinn "in Ireland"

=== Genitive plural nouns after the definite article ===
The genitive plural article na eclipses a following noun:

- na n-asal "of the donkeys"
- na bhfocal "of the words"

=== Dative singular nouns after the definite article ===
In western and southern dialects, nouns beginning with a noncoronal consonant are eclipsed after combinations of preposition + article in the singular (except den, don, and sa(n), which trigger lenition)

- ag an bhfear "by the man"
- ar an gcrann "on the tree"

=== After certain preverbal particles ===
- an poll a dtagann na coiníní as "the hole that the rabbits come out of"
- An dtagann sé gach lá? "Does he come every day?"
- Cá bhfuil mo spéaclaí? "Where are my glasses?"
- Dúirt sé go dtiocfadh sé. "He said that he would come."
- dá mbeadh a fhios sin agam "if I had known that"

== Changes to vowel-initial words ==
In environments where lenition occurs a vowel initial word remains unchanged:

- an oíche "the night" (feminine singular nominative noun after definite article)
- an uisce "of the water" (masculine singular genitive noun after definite article)
- ó Albain "from Scotland" (noun after leniting preposition)
- seanathair "grandfather" (noun after preposed adjective: sean "old" + athair "father")

However, In environments where neither eclipsis nor lenition is expected, an initial vowel may acquire a prothetic consonant. For example, a vowel-initial masculine singular nominative noun requires a ⟨t-⟩ (a voiceless coronal plosive) after the definite article:

- an t-uisce "the water" (masculine singular nominative)

Additionally, there is the prothetic ⟨h⟩ (a voiceless glottal fricative), which occurs when both the following conditions are met:

1. a proclitic causes neither lenition nor eclipsis of consonants.
2. a proclitic itself ends in a vowel.

Examples of h-prothesis:

- a haois "her age" (after possessive pronoun a "her"; compare with a aois, "his age" and a n-aois, "their age" with regular urú)
- go hÉirinn "to Ireland" (after preposition go "to, towards")
- le hAntaine "with Antaine" (after preposition le "with")
- na hoíche "of the night" (on feminine singular genitive noun after definite article)
- na héin "the birds" (on plural nominative/dative noun after definite article)
- chomh hard le caisleán "as high as a castle" (after chomh [xo] "as")
- go hálainn "beautifully" (after adverb-forming particle go)
- Ná himigh uaim "Don't leave me!" (after negative imperative particle ná "don't")
- an dara háit "the second place" (after an ordinal numeral)
