= List of Irish-speaking people =

List of notable speakers of the Irish language

This article lists notable speakers of the Irish language (Irish: Gaeilgeoir, pl. Gaeilgeoirí).

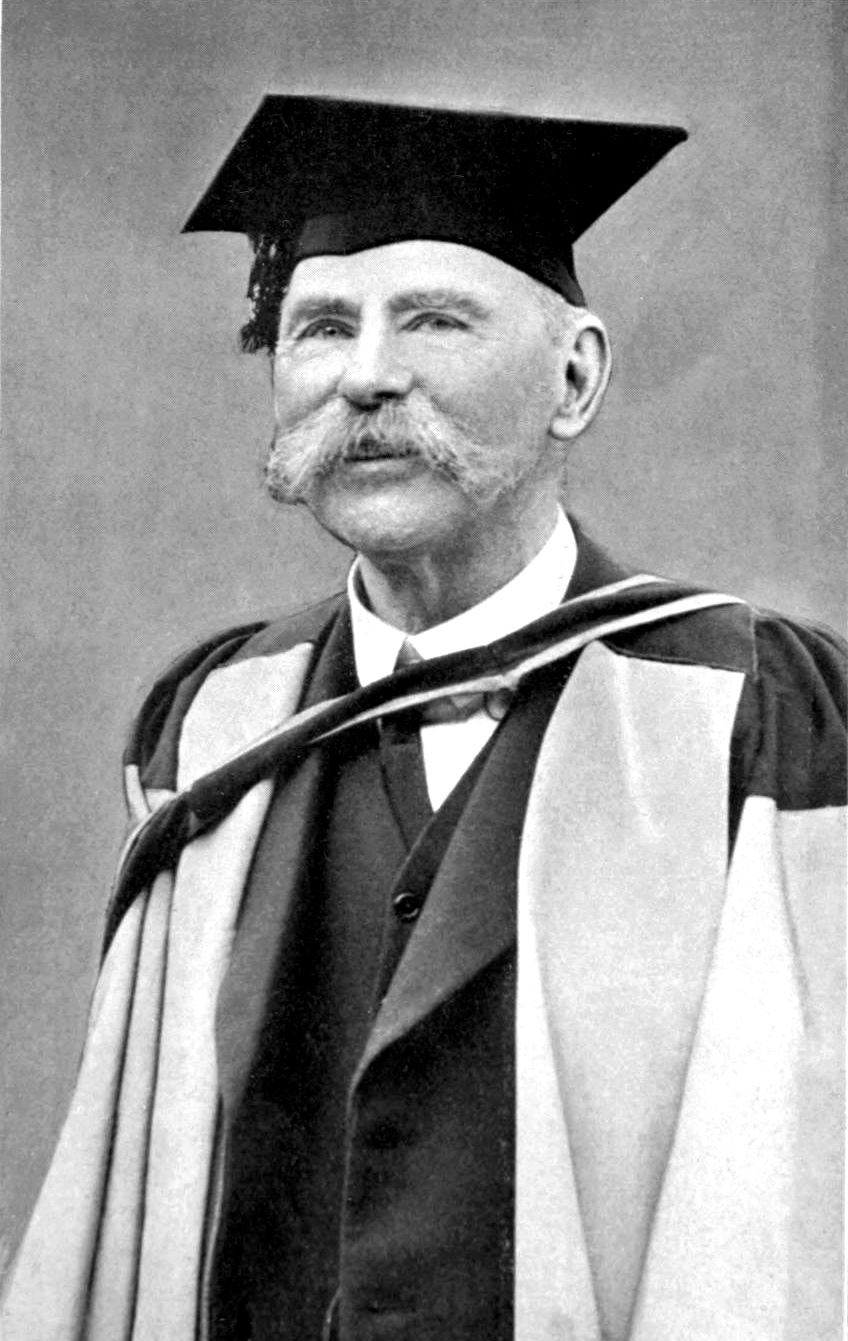
Douglas Hyde

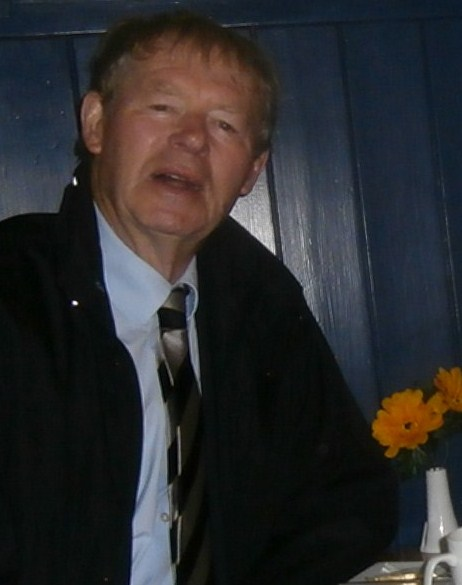
Mícheál Ó Muircheartaigh

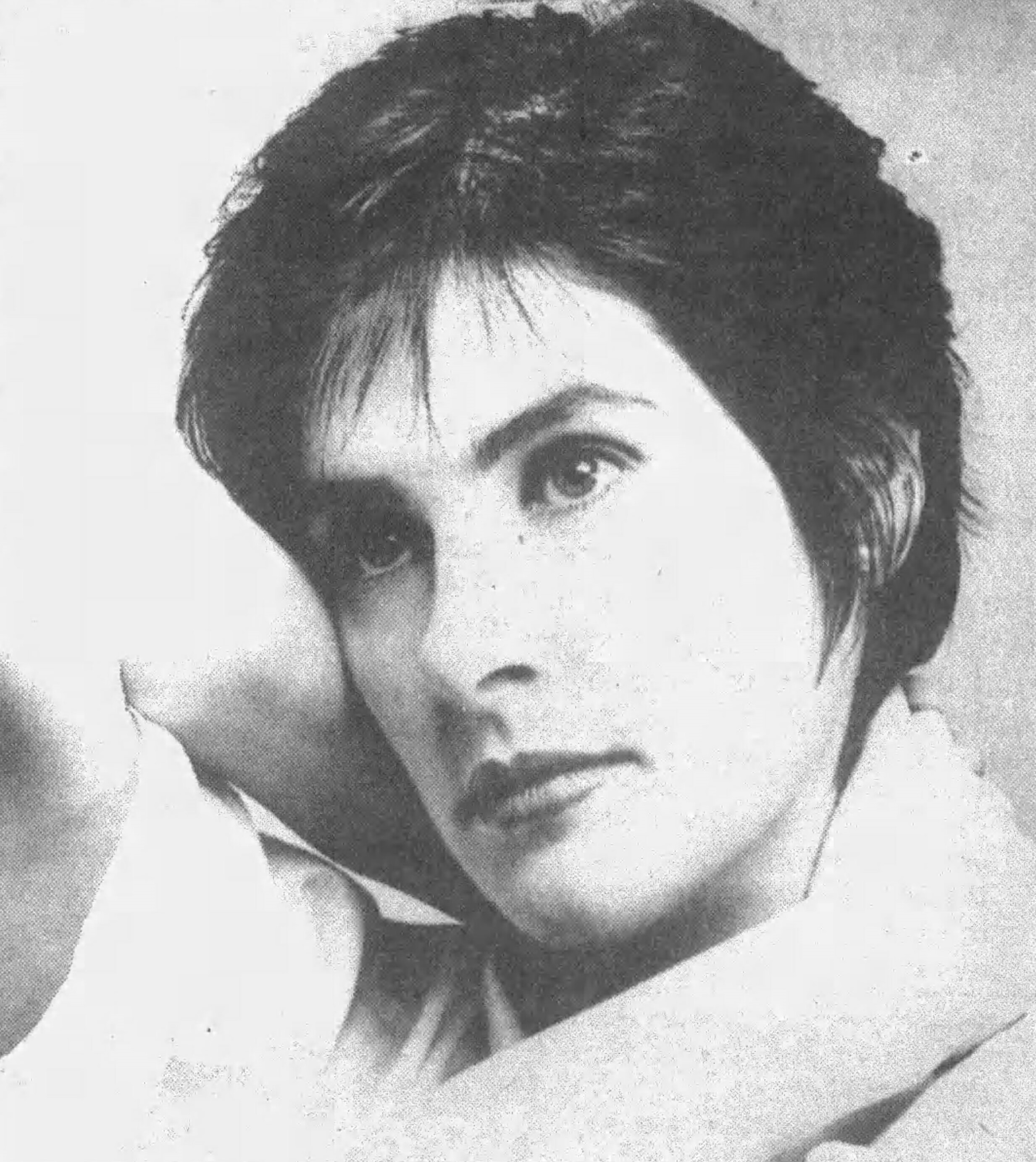
Enya

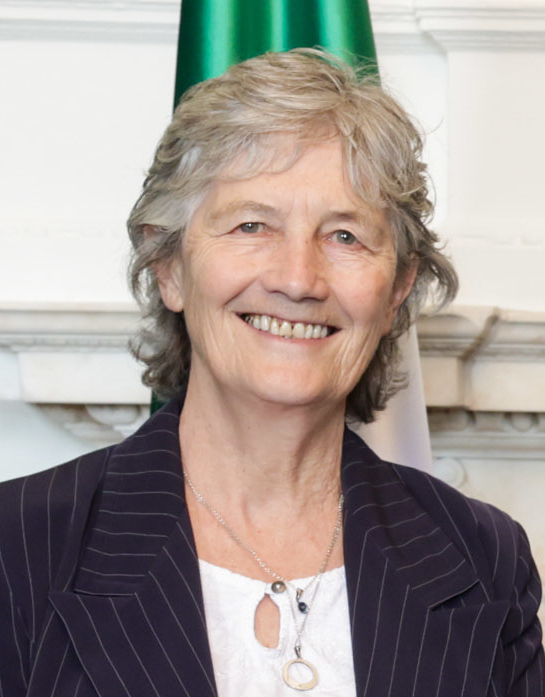
Catherine Connolly

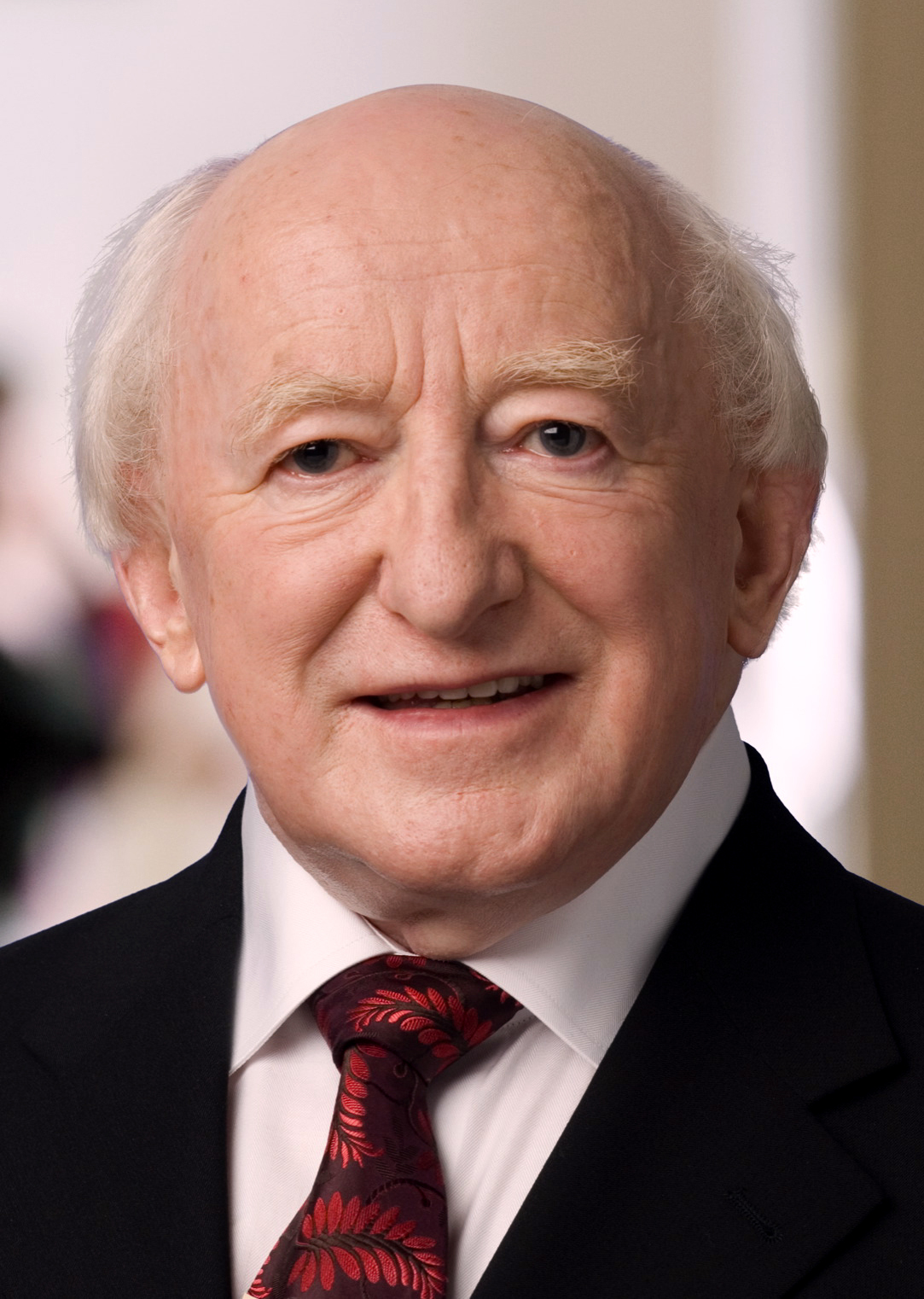
Michael D. Higgins

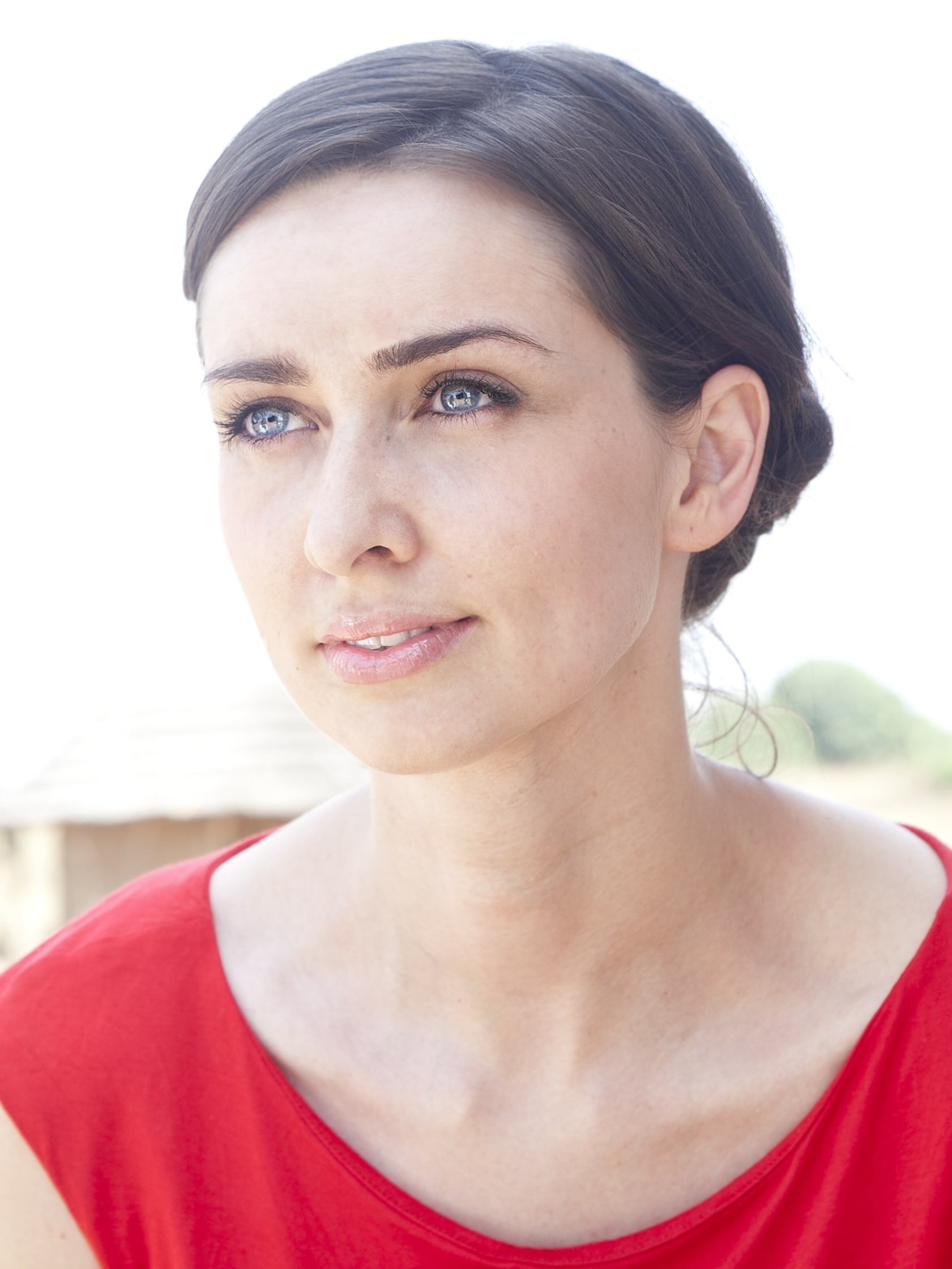
Aoibhinn Ní Shúilleabháin

Some notable fluent Irish language speakers

== List ==
- Vincent Barry (1908–1975), scientist
- Linda Bhreathnach
- Marie Breathnach
- Páraic Breathnach (b. 1956), Irish actor, performer, writer and storyteller
- Seán Bán Breathnach
- Séamus Brennan
- Dara Calleary
- Catherine Connolly
- John Creedon
- Carrie Crowley
- Cyril Cusack
- Maura Derrane
- Noel Dempsey
- Proinsias de Rossa
- Éamon de Valera
- Pearse Doherty
- Éamonn Draper
- Alan Dukes
- Enya
- Máire Geoghegan-Quinn
- Eamon Gilmore
- Brendan Gleeson
- Tony Gregory
- Arthur Griffith
- Joe Heaney
- Joe Higgins
- Michael D. Higgins
- Ann Marie Horan
- Douglas Hyde
- Seán Kelly
- Enda Kenny
- Seán Kyne
- Mick Lally
- Declan Lynch
- Diarmuid Mac an Adhastair
- Darach Mac Con Iomaire
- Máirtín Mac Con Iomaire
- Rónán Mac Con Iomaire
- Thomas MacDonagh
- Niall Mac Eachmharcaigh
- Tomás Mac Eoin
- Seán Mac Fhionnghaile
- Aonghus Óg McAnally
- Donal McCann
- Eoghan McDermott
- Charlie McGeever
- Seán McGinley
- Dinny McGinley
- Pádraig Mac Lochlainn
- Odhrán Mac Niallais
- Joe McDonagh
- Aengus Mac Grianna
- Eoin MacNeill
- Manchán Magan
- Micheál Martin
- Imelda May
- Bobby Molloy
- Shane Moynihan
- Sharon Ní Bheoláin
- Bláthnaid Ní Chofaigh
- Eimear Ní Chonaola
- Róisín Ní Chúaláin
- Máire Eilis Ní Fhlaithearta
- Fionnuala Ní Fhlatharta
- Siún Nic Gearailt
- Yvonne Ní Laife Melo
- Bríd Ní Neachtain
- Liadh Ní Riada
- Aoibhinn Ní Shúilleabháin
- Flann O'Brien
- Maurice O'Donoghue
- Dara Ó Briain
- Eoin Ó Broin
- Breandán Ó Buachalla
- Máirtín Ó Cadhain
- Caoimhghín Ó Caoláin
- Darach Ó Catháin
- Trevor Ó Clochartaigh
- Dara Ó Cinnéide
- Seán Ó Coisdealbha
- Tomás Ó Criomhthain
- Éamon Ó Cuív
- Cearbhall Ó Dálaigh
- Máirtín Ó Direáin
- Peadar Ó Doirnín
- Brian Ó Domhnaill
- Macdara Ó Fátharta
- Gavin Ó Fearraigh
- Tom Sailí Ó Flaithearta
- Seán Óg Ó hAilpín
- Breandán Ó hEithir
- Hector Ó hEochagáin
- Breandán Ó hEithir
- Colm Ó Maonlaí
- Liam Ó Maonlaí
- Mícheál Ó Muircheartaigh
- Joe Steve Ó Neachtain
- Peadar Ó Riada
- Seán Ó Riada
- Aodhán Ó Ríordáin
- Dáithí Ó Sé
- Maidhc Dainín Ó Sé
- Páidí Ó Sé
- Cathal Ó Searcaigh
- Mícheál Ó Siochfhradha
- Pádraig Ó Siochfhradha
- Aengus Ó Snodaigh
- Art Parkinson
- Patrick Pearse
- Joseph Plunkett
- Bob Quinn
- Marian Richardson
- Trevor Sargent
- Gráinne Seoige
- Síle Seoige
- Niall Tóibín
- Peadar Tóibín
- Máire Uí Dhroighneáin
- Mo Chara
- Móglaí Bap

The following non-natives have been known to use the Irish language:

- Stan Collymore
- Stephen Fry
- Charlie Day
- Conan O'Brien

== See also ==
- Acadamh na hOllscolaíochta Gaeilge
- Conradh na Gaeilge
- Gaelic revival
- Gaeltacht
- List of Scottish Gaelic-speaking people
- RTÉ Raidió na Gaeltachta
- Taibhdhearc na Gaillimhe
- TG4
