= List of Ros na Rún characters =

List of characters in Ros na Rún

Ros na Rún is an Irish soap opera that began broadcasting on TG4 on 3 November 1996. The following is a list of cast and characters who currently appear, or who previously appeared, in the series.

== Present characters ==
| Character | Actor(s) | Duration |
|---|---|---|
| Tadhg Ó Díreáin | Macdara Ó Fátharta | 1996- |
| Berni Ní Neachtain | Fionnuala Ní Fhlatharta | 1996- |
| Caitríona Ní Loideáin | Máire Eilis Ní Fhlaithearta | 1996- |
| Micheál Seoighe | Josie Ó Cualáin | 1996- |
| Máire Uí Chonghaile | Máire Uí Droighneáin | 1996- |
| Mack Ó Riain | Pól Ó Gríofa | 1997- |
| Vanessa Barrett | Sorcha Fox | 1997-2001, 2004-2005, 2016–2019, 2021-2022, 2024- |
| Malachi Keane | Maidhc P. Ó Conaola | 1999-2009, 2015- |
| Evan Ó Conghaile | Colm Ó Fatharta (2011-); Ian Ó Nuanáin (2002-2010); Macdara Ó Duibhir (1999-2002) | 1999-2022, 2024- |
| Vince De Búrca | Paul McCloskey | 2000- |
| Jude Uí Neachtain | Máirín Mhic Lochlainn (2024-); Treasa Ní Cheannabháin (2019-2022); Peigí Uí Mhocháin (2001) | 2001, 2011-2012, 2019-2022, 2024- |
| John Joe Daly | Niall Mac Eachmharcaigh | 2002- |
| Mo Gilmartin | Marie Bheag Breathnach | 2002-2021, 2024- |
| David Ó Laoire | Seán Mistéil | 2004- |
| Conall Daly | Gavin Ó Fearraigh | 2004-2009, 2023, 2026- |
| Réailtín Seoighe | Hazel Ní Chúláin (2022-); Aoife Ní Choisdealbha (2016-2020); Aoife Ní Dhíoráin (2005-2016) | 2005-2020, 2022- |
| Noreen Ní Ghallachóir | Máire Uí Rabhartaigh | 2006, 2015- |
| Imelda Uí Shé | Bríd Ní Chumhaill | 2008- |
| Áine Ní Dhíreáin | Doireann Ní Fhoighil | 2009- |
| Maeve Ní Loideáin | Ciara Cox | 2011- |
| Aisling Gorman | Sinéad Ní Fhlatharta | 2012, 2024- |
| Bobbi-Lee Breathnach | Annamaria Nic Dhonnacha | 2014- |
| Laoise Fallon | Seosaimhín Ní Súilleabháin | 2015- |
| Liam Óg Ó Conghaile | Daniel Brennan | 2015- |
| Deirdre Daly | Máirín De Buitléir | 2015-2021, 2023, 2026- |
| Cóilí Jackie | Máirtín Ó Dubhghaill | 2016- |
| Michelle Ní Bhuachalla | Gráinne Bleasdale | 2019- |
| Sonny Derrane | Paraic Breathnach | 2022- |
| Vera Ní Chonceannain | Máire Ní Mháille | 2022- |
| Cam Doherty | Domhnall Ó Braonáin | 2024- |
| Cora Uí Choileaín | Carmel Stephens | 2024- |
| Penny Fallon | Laura Heeney | 2024- |
| Olivia Derrane | Róisín Ní Mhaoláin | 2025- |

== Past characters ==
| Character | Actor(s) | Duration |
|---|---|---|
| Cyril Harkin | Darren Killeen | 2024 |
| Terry Ó Loinsigh | Michael Óg Lane | 2023-2025 |
| Natasha Derrane | Emma Ní Choisdealbha | 2023-2026 |
| Diana Ní Cheallaigh | Fionnuala Flaherty | 2023-2024 |
| Tomás Ó Ceallaigh | Eoghan Ó Riada | 2023-2024 |
| Frankie McFadden | Sam Ó Fearraigh | 2023-2024 |
| Che Derrane | Dara Madden | 2023-2024 |
| Crystal Derrane | Síle Uí Chiaráin | 2022-2025 |
| Mánus Ó Díreáin | Colm Mac Giolla Easbuig | 2022-2025 |
| Luke Ó Riordain | Fiachna Ó Braonáin | 2020-2022, 2024 |
| Sam Ó Dubhghaill | Peadar Mac Donncha | 2018-2025 |
| Sonia Ní Dhubhghaill | Neasa Ní Chuanaigh | 2018-2025 |
| Niall Breathnach | Danny Mac Eachmharcaigh | 2017-2024 |
| Colm Gallagher | Pól Penrose | 2016-2025 |
| Annette Ní Dhonnchú | Mali Uí Chlocartaigh | 2015-2024 |
| Eric O'Shea | Donagh Deeney | 2015-2018, 2022, 2024 |
| Tony Ó Conceannain | Colman Seoighe | 2008, 2017-2022, 2024 |
| Sorcha Ní Chonchubhair | Caitríona Ní Dhomhnaill | 2015-2023 |
| Sadie Ní Chonchubhair | Maggie Hannon | 2019-2023 |
| Briain McDonagh | Colm Mac Gearailt | 2017-2023 |
| Peatsaí Ó Riain | Máirtín Jaimsie | 2016-2023 |
| Greg Ó Coileáin | Gearóid Kavanagh | 2021-2023 |
| Katy Daly | Brídín Ní Mhaoldomhnaigh | 2010-2020, 2023 |
| Rory Keane | Conall Ó Céidigh | 2019-2023 |
| Nuala Ní Fhoighil | Maeve Fitzgerald | 2021-2022 |
| Andy Ó Neachtain | Stiofáin Seoighe | 1999, 2006, 2016, 2019-2020, 2022 |
| Caoilfhionn Ní Shé | Áine Ní Dubhghaill | 2021-2022 |
| Tommy Ó Tuathail | Padraic Ó Flatharta | 2016, 2019-2022 |
| Sally Ní Shúilleabháin | Nóirín Ní Nuadháin | 2016-2017, 2021-2022 |
| Rónán Ó Tuairisg | Maitias Ó Gríofa | 2016, 2021-2022 |
| Charlie McCabe | Fiona Fitzpatrick | 2019-2022 |
| Seandálaí | Séamus Hughes | 2022 |
| Ferdia Mac Aodha | Aodh Mac Eachmharcaigh (2016-); Donagh Deenagh (2006) | 2006, 2016, 2018-2021 |
| Fiach Ó Tuairisg | Eoin Ó Dubhghaill | 2013-2015, 2018-2021 |
| Emma Keane | Elaine O'Hara | 2019-2021 |
| Fia Barrett Ní Chonghaile | Muireann Ní Raghallaigh (2016-); Emily McCloskey (2004-2005) | 2004-2005, 2016-2018, 2021 |
| Pádraig Ó Loinsigh | Domhnall Ó Donoghue | 2012-2021 |
| Dan Ó Dubhghaill | James Riordan | 2021 |
| Adam Mac Donncha | Seán O'Baoill | 2014-2021 |
| Lábhrás Mac Raghnaill | Mícheál Ó hAinín | 2001-2020 |
| Frances Uí Dhíreáin | Ann Marie Horan | 2007-2020 |
| Jay O'Connor | Odhrán Brady | 2017-2020 |
| Nathan Farrell | Daithí O'Donnell | 2019-2020 |
| Angela Uí Dhíreáin | Mairéad Ní Ghallchóir | 1996-2006, 2020 |
| Gráinne Ní Bhraonáin | Brídín Nic Dhonncha | 2007-2019 |
| Amy Ní Bhaoill | Úna Ní Fhlatharta | 2014-2015, 2017-2018 |
| An tAthair Eamonn | Peadar Ó Treasaigh | 1998-2001, 2015-2018 |
| Pól Ó Diomsaigh | Fionn Foley | 2016-2018 |
| Jason O'Connor | Ciabhán Ó Murchú | 1996-2018 |
| Cuán O'Connor | Daniel Cox (2018-); Naoise Brady (2014-2017) | 2014-2018 |
| Úna Ní Riain | Yvonne Ní Laife (2005-); Bríd Ní Threasaigh (2003-2005) | 2003-2008, 2016-2018 |
| Maggie Ní Chadhain | Mary Ryan | 2017-2018 |
| Niamh O'Shea | Méabh Ní Chualáin | 2012-2017 |
| Mikey O'Beirne | Aonghus Óg McAnally | 2002-2004, 2006, 2017 |
| Peadar Ó Conghaile | Joe Steve Ó Neachtain | 1996-2016 |
| Eoin Farren | Daithí Mac Suibhne | 2014-2016 |
| Eimear O'Connor | Seóna Tully (2014-); Gráinne Ní Dhubhda (1996-1998) | 1996-1998, 2014-2016 |
| Peigí Farren | Máire Nic Gearailt | 2014-2015 |
| Sarah Uí Fhlaithearta | Bairbre Hergett | 1996-2015 |
| Cóilín Ó Catháin | Tom Sailí Ó Flaithearta | 1996-2015 |
| Séamus Ó Catháin | Diarmuid Mac An Adhastair | 1996-2015 |
| Lee Ní Neachtain | Róisín Ní Chualáin | 2005-2015 |
| Cathal Hennessy | Garrett Phillips | 2011-2015 |
| Alanna Ní Ruairc | Leah Egan | 2013-2015 |
| Bríd De Faoite | Eithne Nic Enrí | 2008-2014 |
| Dara Ó Ríordáin | Lochlann Ó Mearáin | 2010-2014 |
| Róise De Búrca | Linda Bhreathnach | 2000-2004, 2006-2013 |
| Tina O'Dowd | Tara Breathnach | 2007-2013 |
| Caomhán De Faoite | Seán McDonagh (2009-); Marcus Lamb (2008-2009) | 2008-2012 |
| Molly Stapleton | Lisa Ní Laoire | 2008-2012 |
| Brendán Mac Gearailt | J.D. Kelleher | 2011 |
| Eamonn De Faoite | Mick Lally | 2008-2010 |
| Daniel McLoughlin | Peadar Cox | 2001-2010 |
| Ríona De Búrca | Sorcha Ní Chéide | 2000-2010 |
| Donnacha De Búrca | Eoin Mac Diarmada (2005-); Kieran D. Gough (2000-2001) | 2000-2001, 2005-2010 |
| Jim O'Dowd | Noel Magee | 2004-2010 |
| Steve Crawford | Séamus Hughes | 2007-2008 |
| Éilis Uí Bhriain | Maeve McGrath | 2006-2008 |
| Rhino | Cillian Ó Donnachadha | 2005-2007 |
| Deirdre Ní Ógáin | Eimear Ní Fhatharta | 2001-2006 |
| Suzy McLoughlin | Susie Lambe | 2003-2005 |
| Pauline Ní Bheirn | Mairéad Devlin | 2002-2005 |
| Nancy Burke | Joan Sheehy | 2000-2003, 2005 |
| Sinéad Ní Bhaoill | Darine Ní Dhonnchadha | 1997-2005 |
| Ciarán O'Brien | Séamus Ó Feithcheallaigh | 2003-2004 |
| Rory Murtagh | Stephen D'Arcy | 2002-2004 |
| Ciara Ní Cheallaigh | Siobhán O'Kelly | 1998-2002, 2004 |
| Liam Ó Conghaile | Darach Ó Tuairisg | 1996-2002, 2004 |
| Dylan Doherty | Seán Ó Gríofa (1999-); Dónal Ó Brádaigh (1998-1999) | 1998-2004 |
| Tom Doherty | Seán Ó Tarpaigh | 1996-2004 |
| Jack Hayes | Diarmuid De Faoite | 1996-2004, 2026 |
| Conor Ó Baoill | David Collins | 2000-2003 |
| Síle Nic Pháidín | Deirdre Learmont | 1996-2003 |
| Eileen Lynch | Síghle Ní Chonaill | 1996-2003 |
| Ali Begley | Audrey Ní Fhearghail | 1996-2000, 2003 |
| Denise Bonner | Doireann Ní Chorragáin | 2000-2002 |
| Eddie Ó Coinceanainn | Séan T. Ó Meallaigh (2001-); Dara Devaney (1999-2001) | 1999-2002 |
| Bríd Sinclaire | Máire Ní Mháille | 1997-1999, 2002 |
| Marcus de Bhaldraithe | Marcus Seoighe | 2001 |
| Cathal Ó Fiannachta | Colm Ó Maonlaí | 2000-2001 |
| Treasa Maloney | Sinéad Ní Ghuidhir | 2000-2001 |
| Oisín Maloney | Éanna Ó'Beoláin | 2000-2001 |
| Eithne Rodgers ("Treasa Maloney") | Ethel Burke | 1999-2001 |
| Catherine O'Shea | Mairéad Uí Chuaig | 1999-2001 |
| Harry Lyons | Darach Mac Con Iomaire | 1998-2000 |
| Darren Ó Cinnéide | Pádraic Ó Neachtain | 1999-2000 |
| Louise Ní Ghábháin | Bairbre de Barra | 1999-2000 |
| P.J. Doherty | Peadar Lamb | 1999-2000 |
| Seán Brennan | Brendan Murray | 1996-2000 |
| Robbie Lynch | Aonghus Weber | 1996-2000 |
| Muiris Ó Baoill | Éamonn Draper | 1999-2000 |
| Carmel Doherty | Carmel Stephens | 1998-1999 |
| Áine Nic Pháidín | Anne Learmont | 1996-1999, 2026 |
| Rita O'Connor | Bríd Ní Neachtain | 1996-1999 |
| Owen Collins | Niall Ó Síoradáin | 1997-1999 |
| Paddy O'Connor | Brendan Conroy | 1996-1998 |
| Aodán Ó Riain | Micheal O'Sullivan | 1997-1998 |
| Pól O'Reilly | Séamus Hughes | 1997-1998 |
| Helen Byrne | Ann Marie Horan | 1996-1998 |
| Nickie Byrne | Donagh Ó hArtgáin | 1996-1998 |
| Yvonne Lynch | Mairéad Ní Chonghaile | 1996-1997 |
| Chris Barrett | Maurice O'Donoghue | 1996-1997 |
| Agnes Walsh | Máire Hastings | 1996-1997 |
| Nóirín Ní Scolaí | Brídín Ní Chonghaile | 1996-1997 |
| Freddie Victor | Terry Byrne | 1996-1997 |
| Damita Dye | Pamela Carragher | 1996-1997 |
