= Bhreathnach =

Bhreathnach is a surname. Notable people with the surname include:

- Edel Bhreathnach, Irish historian and academic
- Gearóidín Bhreathnach, Irish singer
- Linda Bhreathnach (born 1983), Irish television actress
- Niamh Bhreathnach (born 1945), Irish politician

== See also ==
- Breathnach
