= Breathnach =

Breathnach (meaning Welsh), or Bhreathnach (feminine form), is an Irish surname, indicating an ancestor who was Welsh. It is the Irish-language version of surnames such as Brannagh, Brunnock, Brannick, Walsh, Wallace, and Wallis.

However, it does not necessarily mean that the ancestor concerned was from modern-day Wales; Robert Bell notes that Wallace was a surname indicating a Briton native of Strathclyde or any part of the Latin name Wallensis meant just that. It can also refer to the Cambro-Normans (later Hiberno-Normans) that were of Norman origin, but came to Ireland via Wales. The name appears in twelfth-century records of Ayrshire and Renfrewshire, parts of the old Strathclyde kingdom ... Wallace has also been used as a synonym of Walsh." (Bell, p. 244). The best known bearer of the name from the area was Uilleam Breatnach (William Wallace).

John de Courcy (1160–1219) planted significant numbers of Britons of Cumbria during his lordship of Ulster. Gaelic-Irish sources such as Dubhaltach MacFhirbhisigh concur, referring to such people as breatnaigh, denoting a Briton (see Old Welsh) (Medieval Ireland, p. 514).

== People with the surname ==
- Breandán Breathnach, music collector and uilleann piper
- Cárthach Bán Breathnach, actor and DJ
- Cormac Breathnach, teacher and politician
- Edel Bhreathnach, academic and historian
- Deasún Breathnach, writer and journalist
- Fiachra Breathnach, Gaelic Athletic Association (GAA) sportsperson
- Gearóidín Bhreathnach, sean-nós singer
- Lucilita Bhreatnach, Sinn Féin politician
- Maire Breathnach, actress
- Máire Breatnach, musician and educator
- Mícheál Breathnach (1881–1908), writer
- Micheál Breathnach (1886-after 1954), educator and writer
- Niamh Bhreathnach, Irish Labour Party politician
- Paddy Breathnach, film director and producer
- Pádraic Breathnach, actor and producer
- Sarah Ban Breathnach, author
- Seán Bán Breathnach, radio and television personality
- Séanna Breathnach, Provisional Irish Republican Army and Sinn Féin member

== See also ==
- Míchael Breathnach GAC, a Gaelic Athletic Association club
- Bhreathnach
