= Cárthach Bán Breathnach =

Irish actor and broadcaster

- Born: 6 October 1989 (age 36); Galway, Ireland
- Education: NUI Maynooth
- Occupations: Actor, broadcaster, Irish teacher
- Parent: Seán Bán Breathnach

Cárthach Bán Breathnach is an Irish actor and broadcaster. As an actor, he is known for his roles in the TG4 series Aifric and the Irish language soap opera Ros na Rún.

Bán Breathnach comes from Indreabhán in the Connemara Gaeltacht and is the son of radio broadcaster Seán Bán Breathnach.

== Career ==
Bán Breathnach played the role of Jimín Ó Gríofa in the Irish language series, Aifric. The first series of Aifric was screened in 2006. Cárthach also played the role of Aodhán, a secondary school student posing as a doctor, in the soap Ros na Rún. His twin, Léan Bán Breathnach, also acted in both Aifric and Ros na Rún.

Bán Breathnach worked as a DJ on the local west of Ireland radio station i102-104. He has also contributed to sports programs on RTÉ and TG4.

== Sport ==
At university, Breathnach was involved with NUI Maynooth GAA and a member of their Sigerson Cup football team.

As of 2019, Breathnach was hurling manager with his local Gaelic Athletic Association club, Cumann Mícheál Breathnach.

== See also ==
- Breathnach
