= Ann Marie Horan =

Irish actress

Ann Marie Horan, Irish actress on TG4 drama, Ros na Rún from 2007 to 2020.

Horan was born in Galway and raised in Eyre Square, the daughter of an actor who worked in An Taibhdhearc. She first acted on stage aged six. She studied French and Spanish at NUIG and became involved in DramSoc, the university's drama group. She graduated aged 19 and moved to Lille where she worked, and ran a small theatre, returning to Ireland a year later. She completed her master's degree, while on a part-time course at Dublin Theatre School. After work as a singer in County Clare she gained voice-work employment on RTÉ Radio.

Horan first appeared on Ros na Rún during the 1992 RTÉ pilot, playing the character of radio personality Caitríona (later recast with Maire Eilis Ní Fhlaithearta in the TG4 series). She would portray Helen Byrne in the early seasons of the main series, later returning in 2007 in the role of Frances Uí Dhíreáin, whom she played up until her departure in 2020.

In a 2011 interview, she listed her favourite and worst things about Galway as "The Atlantic" and "The drizzly rain".
