= Gradam Shean-nós Cois Life =

The Gradam Shean-nós Cois Life is an annual award by the Sean-nós Cois Life-festival in Dublin. The award is given to people who have made an exceptional contribution to the tradition of singing in the Irish language.

== Recipients ==
Recipients have been:

- 1993: Mícheál Ó Ceannabháin, Carna
- 1994: Áine Bn. Uí Laoi
- 1995: Seán 'ac Dhonncha, Carna
- 1996: Treasa Ní Mhiolláin, Inishmore
- 1997: Éilís Ní Shúilleabháin, Cúil Aodha
- 1998: Proinsias Ó Conluain
- 1999: Dara Bán Mac Donnchadha, Connemara
- 2000: Paídi Mhárthain Mac Gearailt, Dingle Peninsula
- 2001: singers from Tory Island
- 2002: Mairéad Mhic Dhonncha
- 2003: Pádraigín Ní Uallacháin, Armagh
- 2004: Máire Uí Dhroighneáin, Spiddal
- 2005: Tess Uí Chonghaile
- 2006: Ríonach Uí Ógáin
- 2007: Eibhlín Uí Dhonnchadha and Seamus Mac Craith
- 2008: Máire Ní Cheocháin, Cúil Aodha
- 2009: Mícheál Ó Conghaile
- 2010: Maidhc Dainín Ó Sé, Dingle Peninsula
- 2011: Lillis Ó Laoire
- 2012: Mícheál Ó Cuaig
- 2013: Máire Ní Chéileachair
- 2014: Johnny Mháirtín Learaí Mac Donnchadha, Connemara
- 2015: Liam Mac Con Iomaire
- 2016: Peadar Ó Ceannabháin
- 2017: Josie Sheáin Jeaic Mac Donncha, Carna
- 2018: Séamus Mac Mathúna
- 2019: Sarah Ghriallais
- 2020: Seosamh O Críodáin
- 2021: An Góilín
- 2022: Éamon Ó Bróithe
- 2023: Ciarán Ó Gealbháin
