= Máire Uí Dhroighneáin =

Irish actress and sean-nós singer

Máire Uí Dhroighneáin is an Irish actress and sean-nós singer. She is a native of Spiddal, County Galway, Ireland.

She has played the character Máire in the Irish language drama Ros na Rún since its first broadcast in 1996.

Her other work includes productions with Cumann Dramaíochta Indreabhán, and the part of Phil in the RTÉ Raidió na Gaeltachta drama Baile an Drochid. Her Ros na Rún colleague Joe Steve O Neachtain performs alongside her in the latter.

Uí Dhroighneáin was awarded the Gradam Shean-nós Cois Life in 2004.

In 2006, she was the "Sean-Nós Singer in Residence at the Centre for Irish Studies" of NUI Galway.
