= Brannick =

Brannick is the anglicized form of the Irish surname Breathnach. Notable people with the surname include:

- James Brannick (1889–1917), English footballer
- John Brannick (1830–1895), Irish whiskey distiller
- Sister Maura Brannick, founder of Sister Maura Brannick Health Center
