= Mícheál Breathnach =

Irish writer (1881-1908)

Mícheál Breathnach (1881 – 27 October 1908) was an Irish writer.

Breathnach was born at Cois Fharraige, County Galway, and worked for some time as a Secretary of the London Branch of the Gaelic League. He later worked as headmaster of the Connaught College in Toormakeady, County Mayo. He spent time in Switzerland for the sake of improving his health, his accounts of the country been published in An Claidheamh Soluis, and later published as Seilig i measg na nAlp. He translated Charles Kickham's novel, Knocknagow into Irish.

His name is commemorated in the name of Inverin based G.A.A. club, Míchael Breathnach CLG.

== Bibliography ==
- Stair na hÉireann, Dublin, Conradh na Gaeilge, 1910–11
- Sliocht de sgribhinuibh Mhicil Bhreathnaigh, maille le na Bheathaibh, Tomás Mac Dómhnaill do sgriobh, 1913
- Seilig i measg na nAlp Dublin, 1917
- Cnoch na nGabha Dublin, 1924

== See also ==
- Breathnach
