= Máire Ní Thuathail =

Irish television producer

- Born: 29 July 1957; Toormakeady, County Mayo, Ireland
- Died: 19 September 2016 (aged 59); Spiddal, County Galway, Ireland
- Occupation: Television producer

Máire Ní Thuathail (29 July 1957 – 19 September 2016) was an Irish television producer, best known for her lead role in producing the long-running Irish-language soap opera Ros na Rún. She was previously a school teacher.

== Biography ==
Ní Thuathail was born in Toormakeady, County Mayo, on 29 July 1957. Her father was Tomás O’Toole and her mother was Brigid Ford. The family ran a local pub where Ní Thuathail was eldest of seven children. Ní Thuathail was educated in Toormakeady before going to University College Galway, where she graduated with a degree in Agricultural Science.

Ní Thuathail became a maths and science teacher in Gweedore. After she got a role with Bord na Gaeilge as an education executive, Ní Thuathail got involved with television.

During the 1980s Ní Thuathail worked for the independent Dublin-based production company Coco. By 1988 she had set up her own company in Spiddal, Eo Teilifís. There she produced children's programming in Irish. When the Irish language television station, TnaG, was founded Ní Thuathail was awarded the contract for the station's soap opera. Working with Tyrone Productions she was the executive producer of Ros na Rún.

Ní Thuathail was awarded the Young Business Woman of the Year award in 1997. In 2010 she was a co-founder of the newspaper Gaelscéal. She has also produced a number of educational TV series including Turas teanga. Throughout her television career Ní Thuathail believed in education and the importance of having people with the Irish language trained in all aspects of the production of television programs. As a result, she was also a founder of the training centre Gréasán na Meán.

Ní Thuathail died of cancer on 19 September 2016.
