= Darach Mac Con Iomaire =

Irish actor, writer and director

Darach Mac Con Iomaire is an Irish actor, writer and director.

Mac Con Iomaire has written and directed four episodes of Corp agus Anam in 2011, and wrote an episode of another TV series, Síol, broadcast in 2010. He has acted in the 2002 short film, Padraig agus Nadia, and as Harry Lyons in a 1996 episode of Ros na Rún. He works almost exclusively in the Irish language. Although raised in Dublin, his father is from Connemara and Irish was spoken at home. The family also spent their holidays in Galway.

Darach Mac Con Iomaire is a former artistic director of An Taibhdhearc, the national Irish language theatre, and a winner of the Walter Macken Memorial Award.
