= Joe Steve Ó Neachtain =

Irish writer, actor, playwright, and broadcaster (1942–2020)

Joe Steve Ó Neachtain (25 October 1942 – 19 January 2020) was an Irish writer, actor, playwright and broadcaster in the Irish language. He was well known for his portrayal of Peadar Ó Conghaile in the long-running soap Ros na Rún. Ó Neachtain, a native Irish language speaker, was born in Cré Dhubh, An Spidéal, County Galway.

Ó Neachtain began writing in 1969 and published many short stories. He won Oireachtas prizes for his songs and also wrote for radio competitions. In addition to his work as a television actor, he appeared on stage at Taibhdhearc na Gaillimhe and elsewhere. His novel Clochmhóin (Cló Iar-Chonnachta, 1998) was awarded the Cló Iar-Chonnachta literary award in 1998. He won the award a second time in 2001 for his novel, Lámh Láidir (Cló Iar-Chonnachta, 2001).

Idir Shúgradh agus Dáiríre (In Jest and in Earnest) is an award-nominated 2005 TG4 funded documentary film about Ó Neachtain, made by Mac Dara Ó Curraidhín.

As an active participant in the Gaeltacht Civil Rights Movement, Ó Neachtain helped lay the groundwork for the establishment of Údarás na Gaeltachta and Radió na Gaeltachta.

== Sources ==
- Singing Shores, Whispering Wind:Voices of Connemara, Raymonde Standun and Bill Long, 2001; ISBN 1-902602-62-5.
- "Joe Steve Ó Neachtain", coislife.ie; accessed 18 July 2020.
