= Micheál Breathnach =

Irish writer (1886-1987)

Micheál Breathnach (1886–1987) was an Irish writer, civil servant and teacher. He was a prolific writer in the Irish language, writing essays, plays, textbooks and translations. Two of his plays were produced by The Abbey Theatre in the 1930s. He was later chair of the Library Council of Ireland in the 1950s.

Breathnach's notable works include the plays Cor in aghaigh an Cháin (1931) and Draoidheacht Chaitlín (1933). His autobiography, Cuimhne an tSeanpháiste was published in 1966. He also contributed to works of Irish folklore.

Born in Tuam, County Galway and the son of two teachers, Brethnach was raised as a Gaeilgeoir (a native-Irish speaker). He was educated by the Jesuits at Coláiste Iognáid, Galway, and later at Queen's University, Galway (now University of Galway) where he graduated with a B.A. in Irish, French and English.

He taught in Tipperary and later Dublin for over six years, and was awarded an MA in Celtic Studies in UCD in 1915. In 1922 he was appointed a National School inspector and promoted to Assistant Chief Inspector of the Department of Education's Secondary Branch in 1932. In 1944 he was appointed Secretary of the Department of Education, holding that post till his retirement in 1953. He prepared a number of texts for the use of Secondary school students, and as the Irish public library movement held a particular interest, in 1954 he was appointed Chairman of the Library Council, An Chomhairle Leabharlanna.

== Select bibliography ==
- Trom agus Eadtrom, Dublin, 1927.
- Fion na filidheachta, 1931.
- Pros na fiannaidheachta, 1932.
- Droidheacht Chaitlin, 1933.
- Cuimhne an tSeanpháiste, Dublin, 1966.

== See also ==
- Breathnach
