= Sorcha Ní Chéide =

Irish actress

Sorcha Ní Chéide, is an Irish actress who works extensively in Irish-language television, stage and screen. She is most famous for her role as "Ríona de Burca" on the long-running Irish language drama, Ros na Rún.

Other roles have included An Gaeilgeoir Nocht and Rásaí na Gaillimhe.

In 2016, she portrayed Helena Molony in the television series Seven Women.

In 2020, she voiced Lulu in the Irish dubbing of Sadie Sparks.
