= Yvonne Ní Laife Melo =

Irish actress

Yvonne Ní Laife, Irish actress, played the character Úna Ní Riain on the Irish language drama, Ros na Rún. She played the part since 2003, following work in Graffiti Theatre Company, Cork. She acted multiple parts at An Taibhdhearc, Amuigh Liom Fein, Clann Lir, Dún na mBan Trí Thine, and was employed as a weather presenter, continuity announcer and presenter on TG4. She played lead female role in 'An Mhallacht' and 'Finnscéal Pháidí' with Oscar nominated director Colm Bairéad (An Cailín Ciúin).
