= Tourmakeady ambush =

Ambush carried out by the IRA in Ireland in 1921

- Part of the Irish War of Independence
Date	3 May 1921
Location	Tourmakeady, County Mayo
Result	IRA victory

Belligerents
(Republic of Ireland) Irish Republican Army (South Mayo Brigade)	(United Kingdom) Royal Irish Constabulary (Black and Tans)

Commanders and leaders
Tom Maguire	Geoffrey Ibberson

Strength
60 volunteers	600 British troops 120 Auxiliaries

Casualties and losses
1 killed 1 wounded	4 killed 1 wounded

The Tourmakeady ambush or Battle of Tourmakeady occurred on 3 May 1921 during the Irish War of Independence. The South Mayo Brigade of the Irish Republican Army (IRA), commanded by Commandant Tom Maguire ambushed an RIC/Black and Tan re-supply patrol in the village of Tourmakeady, County Mayo in the west of Ireland in order to destroy the patrol and to cause the closure of Derrypark RIC Barracks, seven miles to the south.

IRA Adjutant (South Mayo Brigade) Michael O’Brien sustained fatal injuries when he was shot while trying to assist the injured Brigade leader (Maguire). Another IRA Volunteer, Pádraig Feeney, was also killed that afternoon, a monument in Tourmakeady commemorates him. Royal Irish Constabulary Constables Christopher O'Regan, William Power and Sergeant John Regan were killed in the battle. Black and Tans Constable Hubert Oakes also died in the ambush.

Following the ambush, the Flying Column took to the nearby Partry Mountains and were subsequently engaged by British troops from the Border Regiment. Extensive searches and reprisals followed in the area over the next week. On 3 May 1921, in reprisal for the ambush, Crown forces burned several commercial establishments and homes in the area.
