= Éamonn Draper =

Irish actor (1940–2023)

- Born: Edward D. Draper; 1940; Dublin, Ireland
- Died: 27 December 2023 (aged 83); Cork, Ireland
- Occupations: Actor, director
- Years active: 1968–2023

Edward D. "Éamonn" Draper (1940 – 27 December 2023) was an Irish actor and director.

== Biography ==
Edward D. Draper was born in Dublin but grew up in Cork. A schoolboy interest in drama, developed by one of his teachers, saw him acting in the Cork Opera House at a young age. Draper later studied Irish at University College Cork, before joining the Defence Forces. He was commissioned with the 35th Cadet Class of 1961–62 and held the rank of Captain.

Draper continued his involvement with drama on an amateur level during his time in the Irish Army. He left in 1968 to pursue a professional acting career, and worked in Irish language productions with the Daimler Theatre and with the Abbey Theatre. Draper secured his biggest television role in 1970 when he was cast as garage owner Willie Mahony in the RTÉ soap opera The Riordans. He also had a close association as an actor and director with An Taibhdhearc in Galway. Draper's other acting credits include Fair City, Ros na Rún, Killinaskully, Vikings, An Crisis and Game of Thrones.

Draper died in Cork on 27 December 2023, at the age of 83.
