= Róisín Ní Chúaláin =

Róisín Ní Chúaláin, Irish actress, plays Lee on the Irish language drama, Ros na Rún.

Ní Chúaláin has performed in the drama since 2005, and began acting in Galway's Town Hall Theatre.

A native of Carna, she enjoys the cinema, gym, socialising and dancing. She has performed works in both Irish and English.
