= Máire Eilis Ní Fhlaithearta =

Máire Eilís Ní Fhlaithearta is an Irish actress and former model.

== Biography ==
Ní Fhlaithearta plays the character Caitríona on the Irish language drama, Ros na Rún, and has been a regular since its first broadcast. She has been in the acting profession since childhood. She is now married with two daughters, and runs a boutique, ÍOMHA, in An Spidéal.

== See also ==
- Ó Flaithbertaigh
