= Marie Breathnach =

Irish actress

Marie Bheag Breathnach is an Irish actress.

Breathnach played the part of Mo Gilmartin on the Irish language drama, Ros na Rún, from 2002 to 2021.

She is a native of Cnoc Leitirmullen, in Galway, and won the County football final with her local team. She has been an actress since working on a short film by Paul Mercier in 1998.

She is now working as a floor manager in Ros na Rún since 2021.

She recently worked as a stage manager with An Taibhdhearc with their new play Baile Beag Mór.

== See also ==
- Breathnach
