= Edel Bhreathnach =

Irish historian and academic

Edel Bhreathnach is an Irish historian and academic and former CEO of the Discovery Programme.

Bhreathnach was a Tara Research Fellow for the Discovery Programme from 1992 to 2000. In 2005 she was appointed Post-Doctoral Fellow at the Mícheál Ó Cléirigh Institute for the study of Irish History and Civilization, at University College Dublin. In 2013, she left her role in the Ó Cléirigh Institute to rejoin the Discovery Programme as CEO. Her particular areas of interest concern the history of Tara in County Meath, dynastic politics in the kingdoms of Mide and Leinster.She is currently part of the Monastic Ireland network and has published a major study on monasticism in Ireland AD900-1250 (Four Courts Press, 2024).

== See also ==
- Breathnach

== Bibliography ==
The following is a provisional list of Bhreathnach's publications.

=== Articles ===
- Killeshin: An Irish Monastery Surveyed in Cambridge/Cambrian Medieval Celtic Studies, pp. 33–47. 1994.
- Tara: A Select Bibliography, in Discovery Programme Reports No. 3. 1995.
- Temoria: Caput Scotorum? in Éiru No. 47, pp. 67–88. 1996.
- ''Topographical note: Moynagh Lough, Nobber, Co. Meath in Ríocht na Midhe No. 9, pp.16-19, 1998.
- Authority and supremacy in Tara and its Hinterland c.950-1200 in Discovery Reports Programme No. 5, pp.1-23. 1999.
- Kings, the kingship of Leinster and the regnal poems of 'Laídshenchas Laigen': A reflection of dynastic politics of Leinster, 650-1150 in Seachas: Studies in Early and Medieval Irish Archaeology, History and Literature in Honour of Francis J. Byrne, ed. Alfred P. Smyth, Four Courts Press, Dublin, pp.299-312. 2000. ISBN 1-85182-489-8.
- Abesses, minor dynasties and kings 'in clericatu': Perspectives of Ireland 700-850 in Mercia: An Anglo-Saxon kingdom in Europe, M.P. Brown and C.A. Farr (eds.), pp. 113–125, Leicester University Press, 2001.
- 'Two contributors to the Book of Leinster: Bishop Finn of Kildare and Gilla na Náem Úa Duinn' in Michael Richter and Jean-Michel Picard (eds.) Ogma: essays in Celtic studies in honour of Próinséas Ní Chatháin (Dublin, 2002) pp. 105–111
- Medieval sub-kingdoms of Brega: The kingships of Calatruim, Déssi Breg, Mugdornae Breg and Uí maic Uais Breg in The Island of St. Patrick: Church and ruling dynasties in Fingal and Meath, 400-1148, pp. 38–51, Ailbhe MacShamhráin, Four Courts Press, Dublin, 2005. ISBN 1-85182-867-2.

For the following see The Kingship and Landscape of Tara, below.

  - 'Níell cáich úa Néill nasctar géill':The political context of 'Baile Chuinn Chétchthaig, pp. 49-68;
  - Baile Chuinn Chétchthaig: Edition with Kevin Murray, pp. 73-94.
  - The Airgíalla Charter Poem: The political context, pp. -157.
  - The Airgíalla Charter Poem: Edition with Kevin Murray, pp. 124-158.
  - The Medieval Kingdom of Brega, pp. 410-422.

=== Books ===
- The Kingship and Landscape of Tara, (ed.), Four Courts Press for the Discovery Programme, Dublin, 2005.
- Ireland AD400-1000. Landscape, kingship and religion Four Courts Press, Dublin, 2014

•‘Monasticism in Ireland AD 900-1250’ Four Courts Press Dublin, 2024
