= Mícheál Breathnach CLG =

Gaelic sports club in County Galway, Ireland

Mícheál Breathnach Gaeilge líofa CLG
- Founded: 1940
- County: Galway
- Nickname: Na Breathnaigh
- Colours: Blue and White
- Grounds: Mícheál Breathnach GAA Grounds
- Coordinates: 53°14′54.36″N 9°21′58.32″W

Playing kits
Standard colours

Mícheál Breathnach is a Gaelic Athletic Association club based in County Galway, Ireland. The club is a member of the Galway GAA. Underage teams up to U-16's play in the Galway league and championships while further age groups compete in their respective competitions. Na Breathnaigh compete in the Galway Intermediate Football Championship having been relegated from the Galway Senior Football Championship as recently as 2020.

Na Breathnaigh's Hurling squad represent Ireland in the Iomain Cholmcille shinty/hurling international for Gaelic speakers. They have defeated the Scots Gaelic team, Alba, twice in 2007 and 2008. They faced Alba again on 13 February 2010 in Portree but were defeated.

The club is named after Irish-language writer, Mícheál Breathnach, who was connected to the area.

== Achievements ==
- Connacht Junior Club Hurling Championship Winners (1) 2019

== See also ==
- Breathnach
