= Gearóidín Bhreathnach =

Irish singer

Gearóidín winning at the Oireachtas.

Gearóidín Bhreathnach (Irish: [ˈɟaɾˠoːdʲiːnʲ ˈvʲɾʲahnˠəx]) is an Irish singer that originally grew up in Rannafast, in the Rosses, County Donegal; she now lives in Ardveen, also in the Rosses. As a sean-nós singer, she is a triple winner of the Corn Uí Riada competition in Oireachtas na Gaeilge, having won most recently in 2024. Gearóidín is also a seanchaí. Her father Neddie Frank Mac Griana was also a seanchaí, and was a source of her inspiration and love for traditional Irish culture.

== See also ==
- Breathnach
