= Toormakeady =

Tuar Mhic Éadaigh Toormakeady
- Gaeltacht
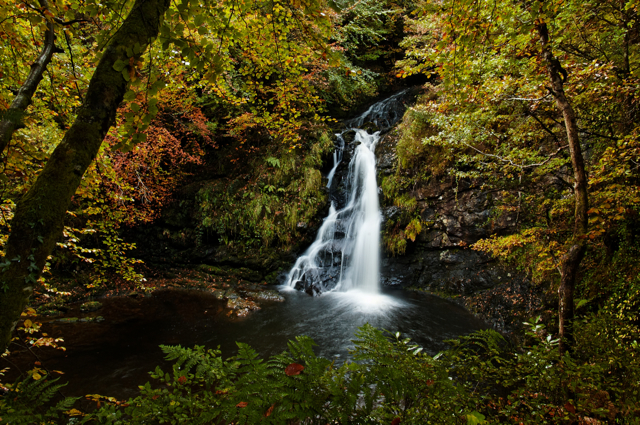
- Toormakeady Falls

- Location in Ireland
- Coordinates: 53°39′23″N 9°21′57″W
- Country: Ireland
- Province: Connacht
- County: County Mayo

Area
  - Total: 172.26 km^{2} (66.51 sq mi)
- Elevation: 58 m (190 ft)

Population (2011)
  - Total: 1,007
  - Density: 5.846/km^{2} (15.14/sq mi)
- Irish grid reference: M097694
- Website: tourmakeady.com
- Tuar Mhic Éadaigh is the only official name. Toormakeady and Tourmakeady are anglicisations.

Toormakeady or Tourmakeady (Irish: Tuar Mhic Éadaigh, the official name) is a Gaeltacht in south County Mayo in the west of Ireland. It is located between the shores of Lough Mask and the Partry Mountains, and covers 172.26 square kilometres (66.51 sq mi). As at the time of the 2011 census, Toormakeady had a total population of 1,007, having dropped from 1,150 in 1991. Toormakeady is also the name of the principal village in the area.

Those parts of Ballinchalla Electoral District in Toormakeady and the whole of the Owenbrin Electoral District in Toormakeady together comprise nearly half of the land area of Toormakeady and were previously parts of County Galway. In 1898 they were transferred to County Mayo.

From the time of the Great Famine of the mid-1840s onwards, the Toormakeady area has experienced a high level of emigration. Many descendants of emigrants return every year to find their roots. The genealogical records for this area have been computerised at the South Mayo Family Research Centre in nearby Ballinrobe to make the task of tracing roots easier.

On 3 May 1921, during the Irish War of Independence the Irish Republican Army south Mayo flying column of around 30 men together with a small number of men from east Mayo mounted an ambush at Toormakeady. The events of this day have been written about in Donal Buckley's book The Battle of Tourmakeady.

The English actor Robert Shaw, best known for his work in From Russia with Love, Jaws and The Sting, lived in Drimbawn House, Toormakeady until his death in 1978. Television producer Máire Ní Thuathail was born in Toormakeady in 1957.

The local sport clubs in Toormakeady include, CLG Thuar Mhic Éadaigh and Partry Athletic Football Club.

== See also ==
- Connacht Irish
- List of towns and villages in the Republic of Ireland
- Thomas Plunket, 2nd Baron Plunket
