= Gavin Ó Fearraigh =

Irish Gaelic actor, dancer and model (born 1980)

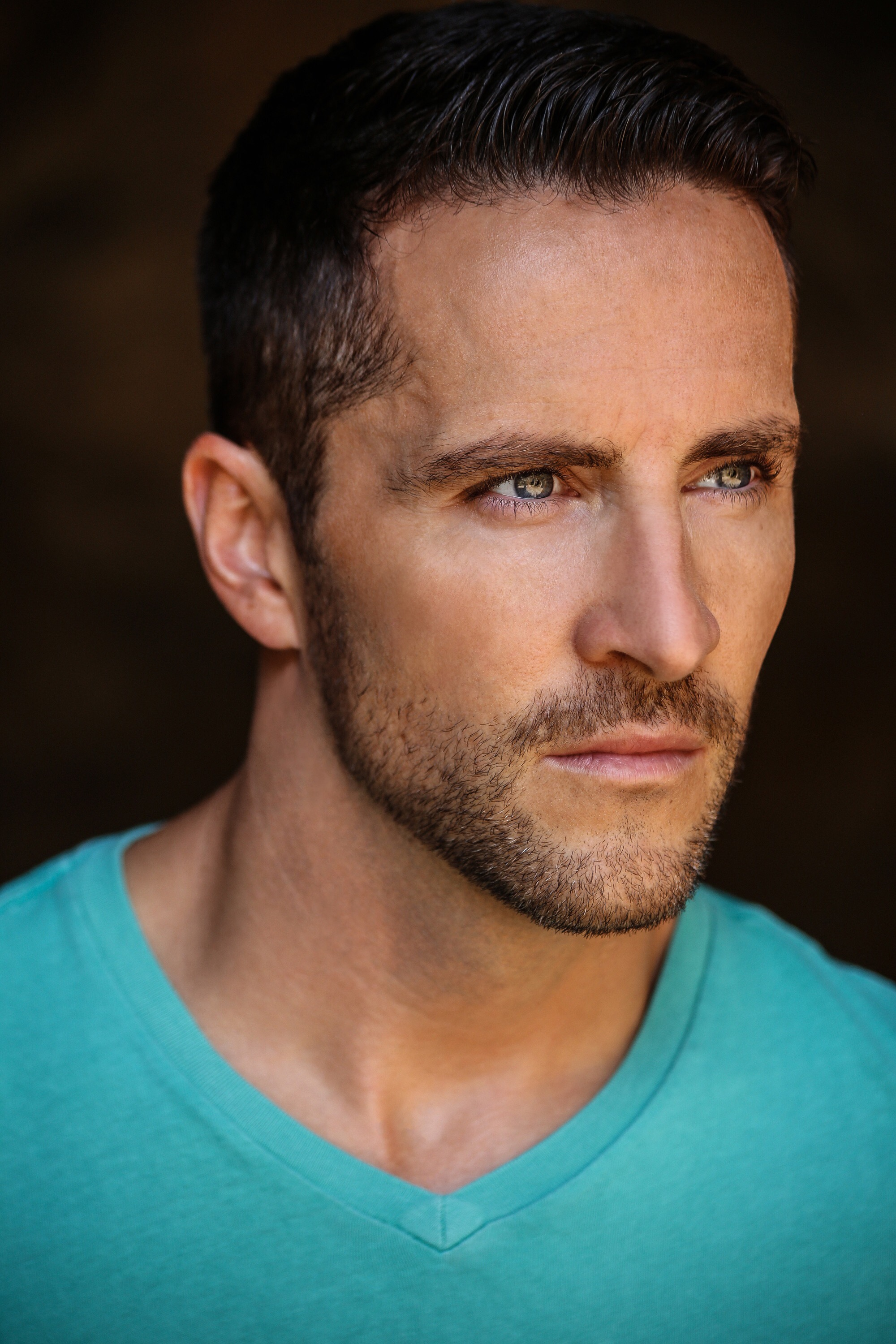
- Gavin Ó Fearraigh in 2016
- Born: 5 May 1980 (age 45); Gaoth Dobhair, County Donegal, Ireland
- Occupations: Actor, model, dancer
- Years active: 2002–present

Gavin Ó Fearraigh (born 5 May 1980) is an Irish actor, dancer and model. He is most notable for his role as Conall Daly in the TG4 soap Ros na Rún. He came first in the Raidió Teilifís Éireann (RTÉ) reality show Celebrity Jigs 'n' Reels in 2007, all in aid of his chosen charity Debra Ireland.

== Early life ==
Gavin was born to Sile and Eugene Ferry on 5 May 1980. Gavin has a twin brother Keith and is one of six boys. There are two sets of twins in his family. He attended Pobalscoil Ghaoth Dobhair.

== Career ==
Gavin also been involved in pantomimes in Galway City with the Performing Arts School Galway and has played the Principal role in their productions of Cinderella, Aladdin, Sleeping Beauty, Snow White and The Frog Prince. He has traveled to the West End in London for several summers to work with the Principals from top West End productions including Wicket, Hairspray, Les Miserable, and Billy Elliot. Gavin was involved in a drama road show, which had been scouting new talent throughout Northern Ireland for the Irish teen drama Seacht. Gavin has worked alongside Oscar nominee Stephen Rea in the TG4 documentary Flight of the Earls. He has also presented several shows on TG4 including Cartai Poist, Paisean Faisean, shabby go chic, Angeal sa chistin and has had numerous appearances on The Late Late Show, Tubridy Tonight, The Afternoon Show and The Den. Gavin modelled for Catwalk modelling agency in Galway and has modelled for clients such as Louis Copeland. He is now signed with NTA Talent Agency in Los Angeles.

On 6 September 2008 representing Ireland, Gavin, in couple with Dearbhla Lennon, took part in Eurovision Dance Contest 2008. In 2009 he was chosen as the face for the Charity Bóthar. He was one of the lead actors in the award-winning (IFTA) drama Corp & Anam (TG4). He now spends most of his time in Hollywood in Los Angeles, where he is currently based. While in LA he has been on the HBO series The Girls Guide to Depravity (2011), the award-winning film Alchemy (2013), the TV series The Black Box (2013), and the Coast Mafia movie (2013). He has performed (on 3 June) with Cobra Starship as a dancer at Miss USA 2012 held at Planet Hollywood in Las Vegas, and as a dancer for Taylor Swift at The 2013 Billboard Music Awards.

He was chosen as one of the lead models for Worldwide Print Campaign for Transition Lenses eyewear and also as the face of H.wood Beauty along with actress and model Claire Bermingham based in LA. He also travels to the East Coast as Master of Ceremony for VIP Dance and Encore performing Arts, which are national dance competitions held annually in the States. In 2014, Gavin teamed up with presenter Mairead Ni Chuaig (TG4) for Series 3 of Wwoofáil California, where they both traveled the West Coast of California to work as 'Wwoofers' on organic farms. The show was nominated for an IFTA (Irish Film & Television Awards) in 2015. Gavin filmed Series 4 of Wwoofáil Oz, where himself and Mairead travelled to six organic farms on the Gold Coast of Queensland, Australia.

Ó Fearraigh spent three months filming in Portland, Oregon, during the Pandemic on Top Chef season 18 in casting, moving on to work on Top Chef Amateurs, Top Chef Family Style and Big Brother in Los Angeles. Gavin filmed in Houston, Texas on Top Chef season 19 as Sequester APOC. In 2022 he worked on the Netflix TV show The Big Nailed It Baking Challenge then later landed the lead role as "Finn" in the horror/thriller movie Holistay filmed in San Diego and Las Vegas. He worked on Big Brother season 25, then later resumed his role as Sequester Apoc in season 21 of Top Chef in Milwaukee Wisconsin. In November 2022 to February 2023 he returned to Irish soap opera Ros na Rún where his character Conal Daly returned after 14 years. Gavin has continued to expand his film career, recently being cast as the lead role of Ian in the upcoming psychological thriller MOUSER, produced by Breaking Glass Pictures and set for release in 2026.
