= Niall Mac Eachmharcaigh =

Irish actor

Niall Mac Eachmharcaigh, Irish actor, plays the part of John Joe Daly on the Irish language TG4 drama, Ros na Rún.

Mac Eachmharcaigh has been a series regular since 2002, and began his career as a prompter in 1973.

His acting credits include the Irish language programme Anois agus Aris (1980) and appearances in C.U. Burn.
