= Sarah Ban Breathnach =

American writer

Sarah Ban Breathnach (pronounced "Bon Brannock"), is the author of thirteen books, including Simple Abundance: A Daybook of Comfort and Joy which spent more than two years on The New York Times Best Seller list where it held the number one position for most of a year. Simple Abundance has sold over 5 million copies and has been translated into 28 languages. Ban Breathnach's follow up book Simple Abundance, Something More, debuted at the number one spot on the best selling book lists of the New York Times, USA Today, The Wall Street Journal and Publishers Weekly. To date, Something More has sold over 1.2 million copies. Ban Breathnach was also the first author in the history of the Wall Street Journal's list of best-selling books, to appear in both the number one (Simple Abundance) and number two (The Simple Abundance Journal of Gratitude) slots.

Ban Breathnach was born Sarah Crean in Westbury, New York. Her first ambition was to become an actress and at age 25 she moved to London to pursue this career while working as a secretary. This pursuit was unsuccessful and she tried writing, eventually selling her first article about fashion to a trade magazine. She returned to Washington in 1975 and was published in newspapers such as The Washington Post. In 1979 she married Ed Sharp. While recovering from a head injury she developed an interest in some Victorian-era magazines, and this led to the publication in 1990 of Mrs Sharp's Traditions and two years later in The Victorian Nursery Companion. Thirty publishers turned down Simple Abundance before Warner Books agreed to publish the book in 1995. Ban Breathnach started the Warner Books imprint Simple Abundance Press in 1998 with the intent of issuing books in the spirituality and life style market under it.

Ban Breathnach has a daughter.

== Published works ==
- Simple Abundance
- Something More
- Simple Abundance Journal of Gratitude
- Peace and Plenty
- The Best Part of the Day
- The Simple Abundance Companion
- A Man's Journey to Simple Abundance
- The Peace and Plenty Journal of Well-Spent Moments
- Romancing the Ordinary
- Moving On
- The Illustrated Discovery Journal
- Mrs. Sharp's Traditions
- The Victorian Nursery Companion
