= Sister Maura Brannick Health Center =

Primary care clinic in Indiana, U.S.

Coordinates: 41.672614°N 86.260484°W

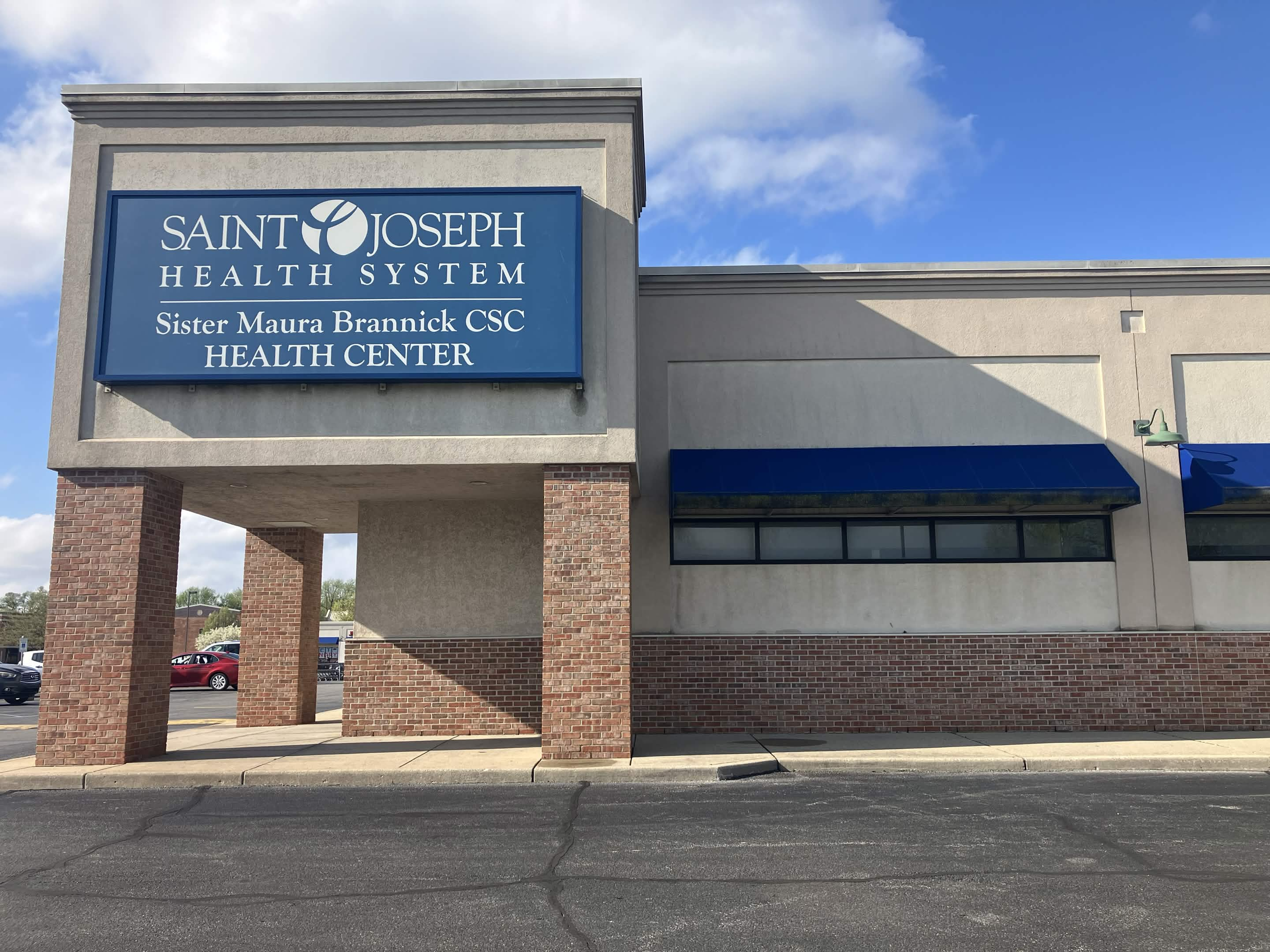
Sister Maura Brannick Health Center in April 2026

The Sister Maura Brannick Health Center is a primary care clinic located in South Bend, Indiana, that focuses on medical treatment for uninsured patients. Also known as the Chapin Street Clinic, the clinic provides health and dental care to those who do not have access to Medicare or Medicaid and cannot afford private health insurance. The Health Center relies on 30 volunteer physicians and around 30 student and community volunteers, along with its one staffed physician and two nurses, to meet the needs of its 600 patients.

== History ==
The Health Center was founded in 1986 by Sister Maura Brannick, CSC. A Holy Cross Sister and a nurse, Sister Maura wanted to provide basic medical care to the needy residents of South Bend who had very little access to the city's medical services. Sister's vision was to staff a small clinic with nurses and to recruit one or two physicians to accept referrals for the sickest patients.

Once word about Sister's idea spread, the response from physicians was much greater than she had hoped for. By its third month of operation, 12 physicians were volunteering their time at the small clinic and within a year plans were underway to move the clinic from the two car garage it had occupied and into a larger facility on Chapin Street.

After moving to the new facility in 1989, both the number of patients and the number of volunteers grew until, in 1997, it was decided to build a new building to house the Health Center. When building the new facility, Sister Maura and the rest of the Clinic staff wanted the new Center to serve as a community center and not simply a Clinic. As a result, the Health Center also features a community meeting room, a food pantry, an exercise room, and a dental clinic in addition to its medical offerings. The Health Center moved into its new and current home in 1998.

In October 2006, the center was renamed the Maura Brannick Health Center.

== Services ==
The Health Center is not a walk-in clinic but rather is set up as a physician's office. The Health Center provides each patients with a primary care physician who will treat and track the patient's health as long as they are at the Health Center. Each patient is assigned a specific physician to provide the continuity of care that is essential for a healthy doctor-patient relationship.

The cost to the patient for each doctor's visit is free. This payment includes the doctor's visit, any lab work or diagnostic studies ordered, specialty referrals, and the medications prescribed by the physician.

Many specialists also volunteer at the Health Center. Specialties offered include cardiology, dermatology, endocrinology, ophthalmology, orthopedics, and gynecology. Additionally, the Health Center has established relationships with physicians across the South Bend area, allowing the staff to refer patients to other physicians if the necessary services are not offered at the Health Center.

The Health Center also houses a three-room dental clinic that can perform most needed dental work and x-rays, excluding most cosmetic dentistry. The dental clinic is also staffed largely by volunteers, with 9 dentists currently donating their time. Dental visits are free, though dentures are an additional charge.

== Patient eligibility ==
The Health Center's mission is to provide healthcare for individuals who are unable to qualify for government healthcare but cannot afford private insurance. In order to be eligible to become a patient, therefore, an individual must live in St. Joseph County, have income at or below 200% of the poverty level, and cannot have Medicare, Medicaid, or health insurance. The application process includes an initial evaluation of eligibility and then a verification of the financial information provided by the applicant.

== Volunteers ==
The backbone of the Health Center is its volunteers. Every month, close to 100 physician and non-physician volunteers donate their time to assist in the care of the Health Center's patients.

Non-physician volunteers have their talents utilized in a variety of ways at the Health Center. Typical volunteer positions include signing in patients, answering telephones, filing, charting, and assisting patients in filling out necessary forms.

The Health Center is very fortunate to have several schools and universities from which to draw students. Notre Dame, Saint Mary's College, Indiana University South Bend, Bethel College, and Moreau Seminary have all had students volunteer at the Health Center. Typically, 30-40 students come weekly to the Health Center every semester. Students are placed much as other non-physician volunteers, matching their skills and interests with the Health Center's needs. Often students have the opportunity to take the patients' vital signs and shadow doctors that come in. As a result, many students use their experience at the Health Center to learn more about medical professions.

In addition to other volunteers, each year an internship at the Health Center is funded by the St. Joseph Valley Alumni Club of Notre Dame and St. Joseph Regional Medical Center. The internship began in 1993 when a former volunteer at the Clinic asked the Alumni Club and St. Joseph Hospital to fund a full-time position that would allow a student to learn more about caring for South Bend's medically underserved population. This internship is offered to a recent Notre Dame graduate who plans on applying or has already been accepted to medical school. The position was named after the famous Notre Dame graduate and physician Thomas Anthony Dooley III.
