= Linda Bhreathnach =

Irish actress

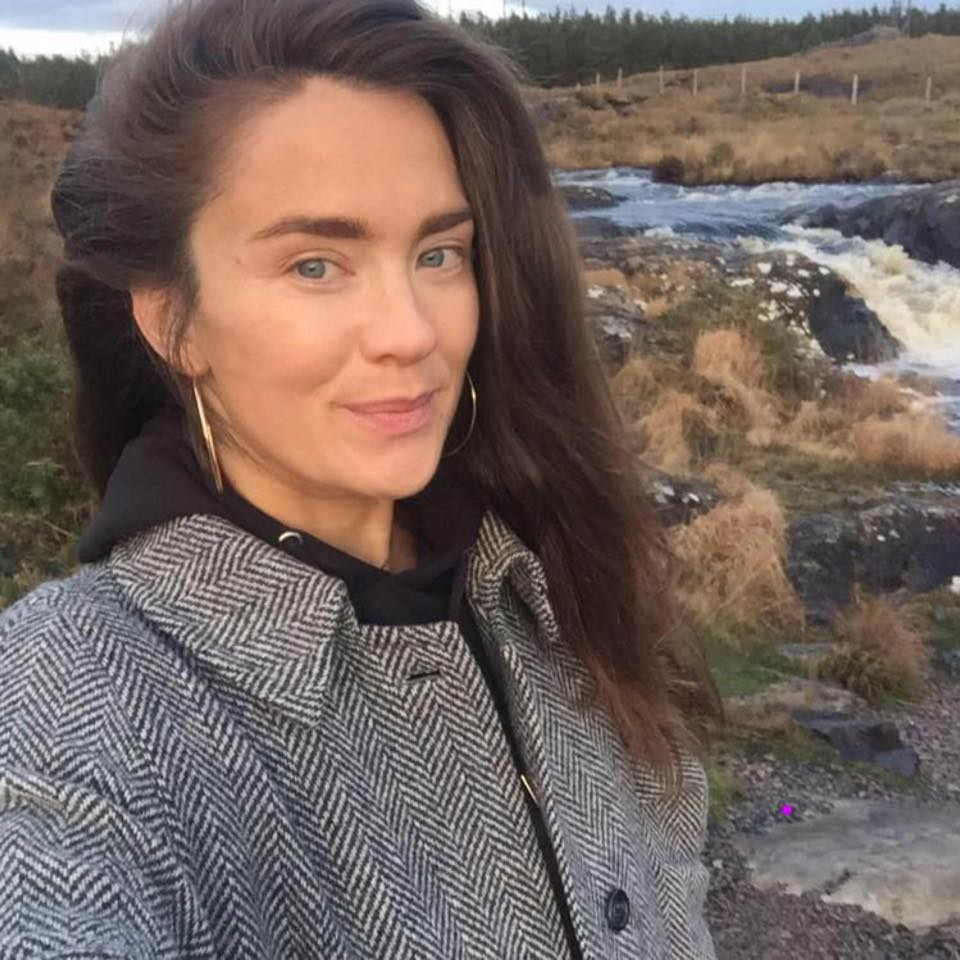
- Bhreathnach, 2018
- Born: Ireland
- Occupation: writer
- Known for: writing and directing short film Adulting

Linda Bhreathnach is an Irish writer, director and actress.

From Ros Muc, Conamara in the west of Ireland, Bhreathnach wrote and directed short film Adulting.

Among other awards Linda's film 'Adulting' won best short film at the London Irish Film festival and she won a Rising Star Award with Irish Screen America (New York and Los Angeles) for her work on the same film.

Linda is a former Miss Galway (2007) and a runner up for Miss Ireland in the same year.

In 2017, Bhreathnach wrote and directed Native, a short film shot in Ireland starring Patrick Bergin. Native was nominated for Best Cinematography by Sean T. O'Meallaigh and Best National/International Short Film by Linda Bhreathnach at the Richard Harris International Film Festival. Native was produced by Linda Bhreathnach and by Marina Donahue of Corner Bar Pictures.

In 2018, Bhreathnach released the short film My Mother is my Priest. The film is described as a 'celebration of mothers' and was released by Linda Bhreathnach Films. Bhreathnach created, wrote, directed and performed in the film. In 2021, Linda wrote the screenplay 'Girleen' a contemporary film on the life of women and girls in the modern world.

She played the part as "Róise de Burca" in the long-running soap opera Ros na Rún. While in character Bhreathnach participated in the first Lesbian kiss episode on Irish television. Bhreathnach also had a starring role in the critically acclaimed political drama The Running Mate and in the BBC/TG4 drama Seacht / Seven.

== Filmography ==
=== Television ===
Year	Title	Role	Notes
2007	The Running Mate	Fiona Flynn	4 episodes
2006-2007	Aifric	Lúsaí Ní Chadhain	2 episodes
2008-2010	Seacht	Eithnne	Main cast
2007-2011	Ros na Rún	Róise De Búrca	Recurring
2011-2014	Corp & Anam	Sarah O'Regan	Recurring
2016	The Irish Mob	As Self	Documentary series; 2 episodes
2019	Der Irland-Kriml	Nora Dunne	Episode: Mädchenjäger

=== Film ===
Year	Title	Role	Notes
2016	Adulting	Jane	Short, also produced, wrote, and directed
2017	A Break in the Clouds	Ally	Short
