= Diarmuid Mac an Adhastair =

Irish actor

Diarmuid Mac an Adhastair (9 December 1943 – 10 July 2015) was an Irish actor who portrayed the character Seamus Mhicil Tom on the Irish drama, Ros na Rún. He appeared from the pilot in 1996 up until the show's nineteenth season. His prior acting was in amateur drama, and he also acted in two short films and a documentary about his life. His pastimes included fishing and wood carving. He listed Pól Ó Foighil and Johnny Chóil Mhaidhc as "People who have influenced me the most".

== See also ==
- Nestor (surname)
