= Seán Bán Breathnach =

Irish television personality (born 1949)

- Born: 1949 (age 76–77); County Galway, Ireland
- Other names: SBB
- Occupations: Radio and television presenter
- Employer(s): RTÉ, TG4

Seán Bán Breathnach (born 1949) is an Irish radio and television broadcaster and personality. He broadcasts primarily in the medium of the Irish language.

== Early life and career ==
Born in the Connemara area of County Galway, Breathnach moved to the United Kingdom as a teenager and worked as a DJ at discos in London. After returning to Ireland, he worked for Radio Éireann in the late 1960s.

== Broadcasting ==
When he was 19 years old in 1969, Breathnach presented the first Irish language pop music programme on Raidió Éireann. Shortly afterwards he presented his first television show, Imeall, a bilingual folk music show. In 1975, he had the lead role in Bob Quinn's first feature Irish-language drama, Caoineadh Airt Uí Laoire. He hosted the show SBB ina Shuí with Gráinne Gleoite from 1976 to 1982. This became the highest-rated Irish-language television programme at the time, coming first in TAM ratings in 1979.

Over the coming years, Breathnach presented several television and radio programmes and documentaries for the state broadcasting corporation Raidió Teilifís Éireann (RTÉ), the Irish-language broadcaster TG4 and the RTÉ national-regional station RTÉ Raidió na Gaeltachta. He is also known for his radio sports coverage.

In 1978, he was appointed to RTÉ Raidió na Gaeltachta staff. He worked mainly with the sports department and has presented the station's flagship sports programme, Spórt an tSathairn for several years. In 1991, Breathnach won a Jacob's Award for his sports commentaries on Raidió na Gaeltachta.

Other work in television has included the community based programme Eadrainn Féin (1984–1986) and Scaoil Amach an Bobailín with Cynthia Ní Mhurchú (1990–1993). Since the formation of TG4, Breathnach has also been involved in programmes such as Cleamhnas and a soccer programme which covered the possible influence of Celts on the game.

In February 2007, Breathnach began presenting an hour-long music documentary Siar agus Aniar, on RTÉ Raidió na Gaeltachta. Later in 2007, he took part in RTÉ One's Charity You're A Star to raise money and awareness for the Carers Association of Ireland. He was the runner-up.

== Personal life ==
Breathnach lives in Indreabhan, Cois Fharraige in County Galway. He is married with four children. His wife Brighid is from another Gaeltacht area in County Waterford (An Rinn). His twin children Léan and Cárthach Bán Breathnach both had acting roles in the TG4 series Aifric. His eldest daughter Brighid is a television producer, and his second eldest daughter Katie is a teacher.
