= Spiddal =

Village in County Galway, Ireland

Spiddal An Spidéal Spiddle
- Village
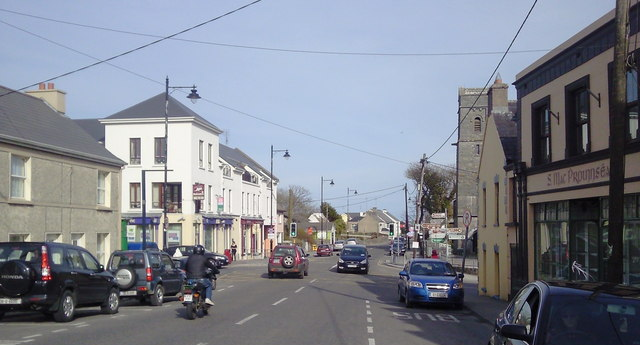
- Main Street (R336 road)

- Location in Ireland
- Coordinates: 53.24418°N 9.3059°W
- Country: Ireland
- Province: Connacht
- County: County Galway

Population (2022)
  - Total: 254
- Irish grid reference: M130225
- In statute law, the village's official name is An Spidéal, or in the English language, Spiddle.

Spiddal, also known as Spiddle (Irish and official name: An Spidéal, pronounced [ənˠ ˈsˠpʲɪdʲeːlˠ], meaning 'the hospital'), is a village on the shore of Galway Bay in County Galway, Ireland. It is 18 kilometres (11 mi) west of Galway city, on the R336 road. It is in a Gaeltacht (Irish-speaking) area in the Connemara region.

According to the 2022 census, approximately 75% of the population are Irish-speaking and, of these, approximately 40% speak Irish on a daily basis outside the education system. Spiddal is a centre for tourism with a beach, harbour, and shore fishing. The village is part of the civil parish of Moycullen.

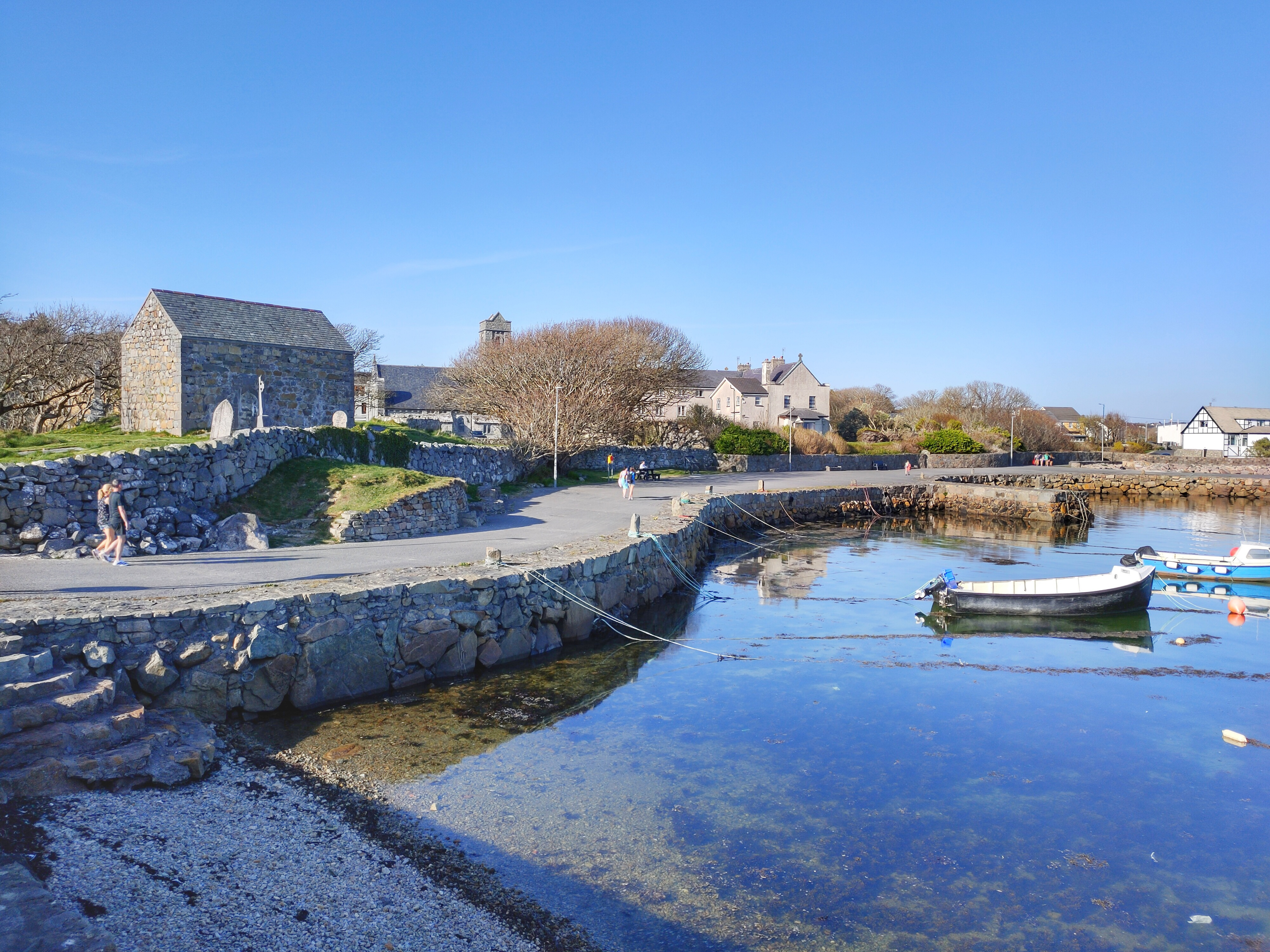
Old harbour with ruined 18th century chapel at left. Tower of adjacent 20th century chapel, Cill Éinde, behind tree.

== Name ==
The name of the village in Irish, An Spidéal, derives from the word ospidéal, which in turn derived from the Insular French, or Anglo-Normand, word ospitel.

The name originates from a mediaeval leper hospital situated in An Spidéal Thiar (West Spiddal). A number of other hospital facilities were based in the area over the years, including a famine hospital during the Great Famine of the mid-1840s. While "Spiddle" is recorded in the Placenames Database of Ireland as the English variant of the name, "Spiddal" is used locally.

== History ==
Spiddal, like much of the west of Ireland, suffered greatly during the Great Famine of the 1840s, with many people being evicted, and many starving. Appeals were made by the parish priest John O'Grady and by A.W. Blake and, as a result, the Board of Works employed some men in improvements to the village harbour.

From 1848, the evangelical Protestant Irish Church Missions were active, establishing the Connemara Orphan's Nursery (Spiddal Orphanage or Nead Le Farraige) in the early 1850s, the home could accommodate up to 90 boys and girls, and became affiliated with the Protestant-run Smyly Homes (and was even referred to as The Bird's Nest, the name of the home in Dublin). Following its closure as an orphanage, it became a secondary school for girls run by the Catholic Sisters of Mercy.

The local Catholic church, Cill Éinde (church of Saint Enda), was built in 1904. The ruin of an older chapel, dating to 1776, is nearby.

== Amenities ==
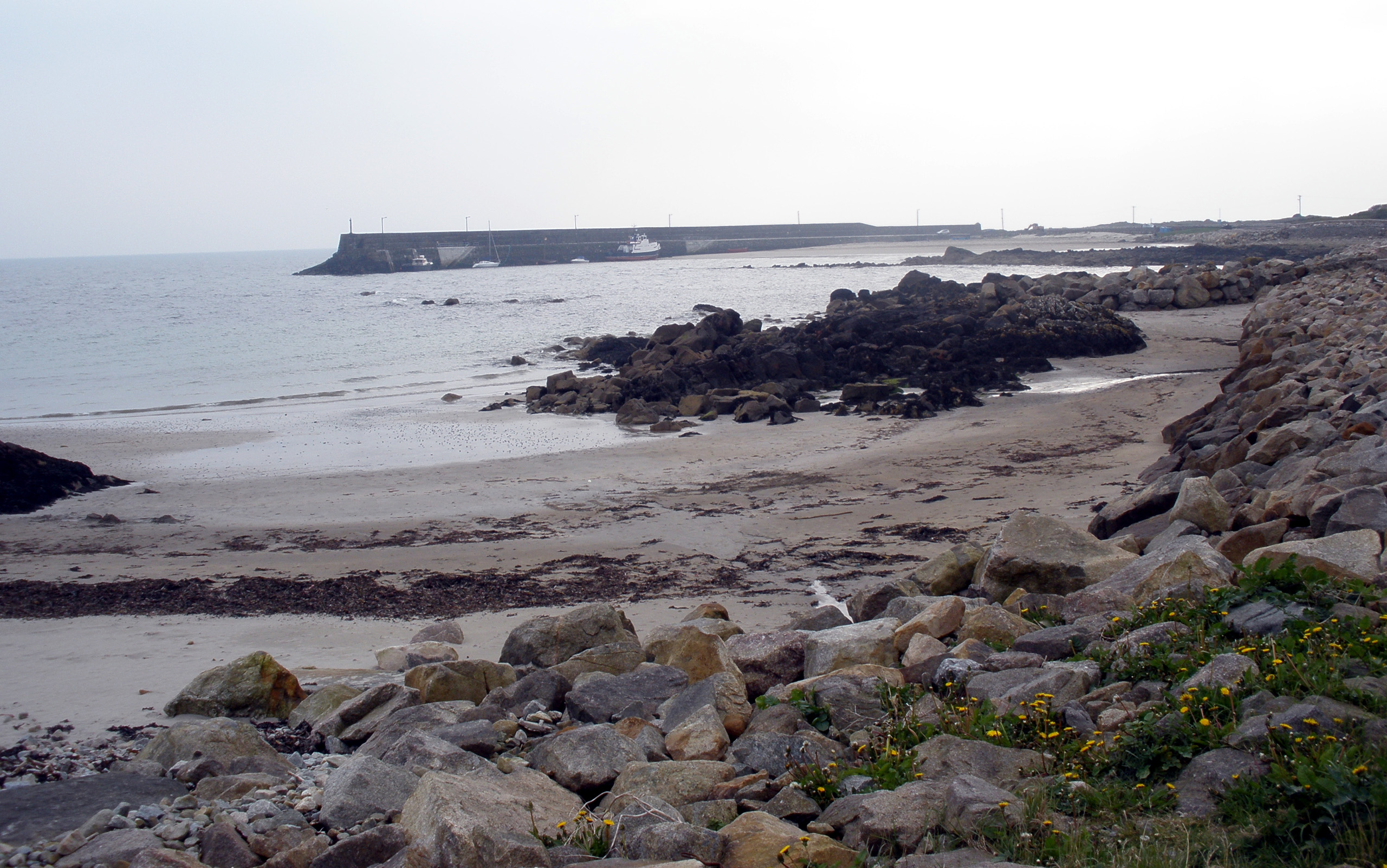
The Pier, Spiddal

There are a number of pubs, shops and other services in the village. Spiddal's Garda (police) station is on Mountain Road. An Ceardlann ("the workshop" in Irish) is a craft centre east of the village where craft works are made and sold.

There is a primary school (Scoil Náisiúnta Éinne) and secondary school (Coláiste Chroí Mhuire).

The area is served by Bus Éireann route 424 from Galway City. The Boluisce River flows south from Boluisce Lake and enters Galway Bay at Spiddal.

== Culture and sport ==
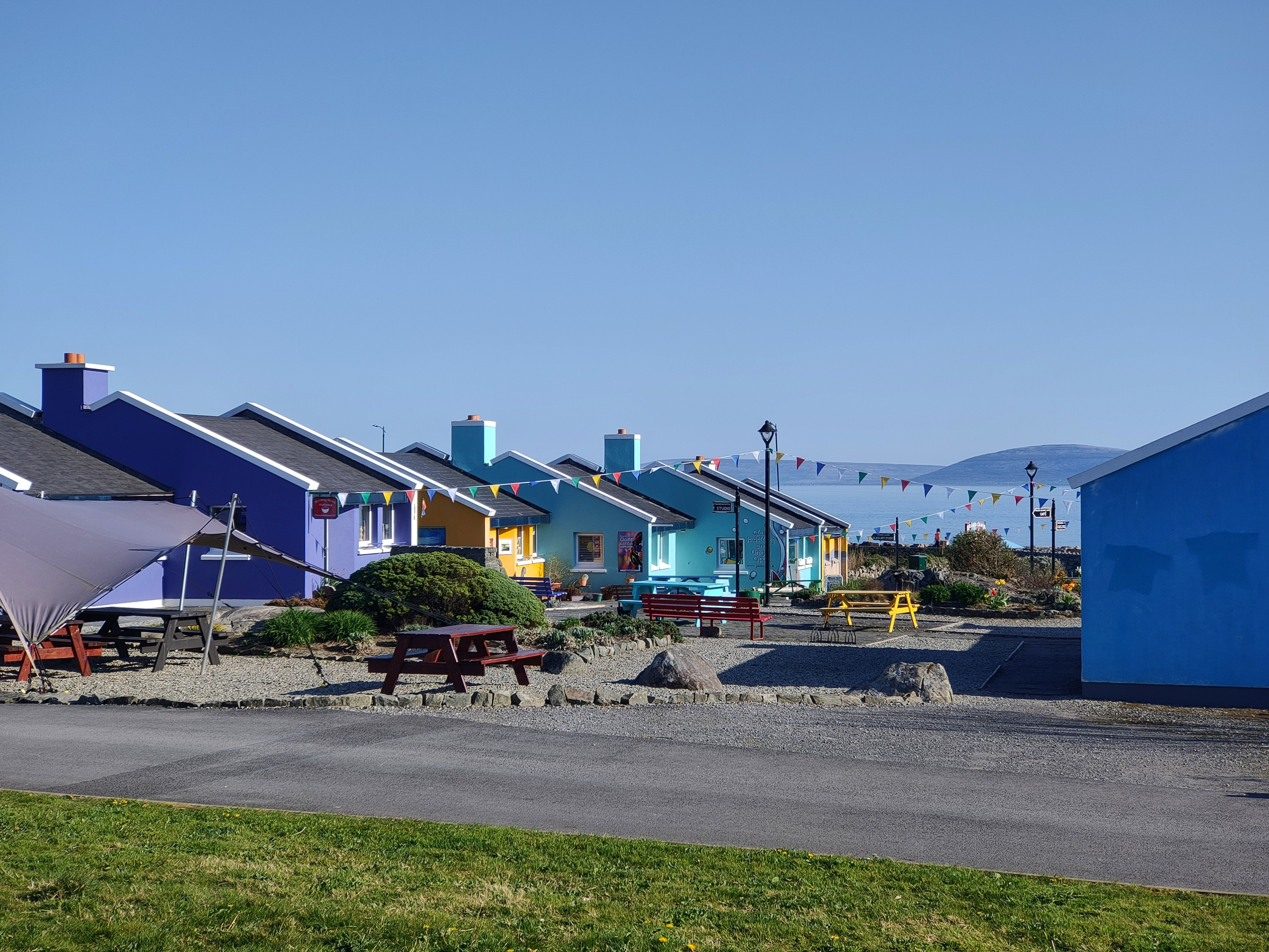
An Ceardlann, the craft centre

Each summer, groups of Irish teenagers visit Spiddal for three-week Irish language courses. Coláiste Chonnacht and Coláiste Lurgan are two Irish language summer schools. American students visit for the autumn term each year to study Irish-language literature and culture.

Live traditional Irish music is regularly performed in the village's pubs. The music group The Waterboys recorded part of their Fisherman's Blues album in Spiddal. They also recorded a song called Spring Comes to Spiddal on their album Room to Roam. The television series Ros na Rún is filmed there, and broadcast on TG4.

The local Gaelic Athletic Association club is Cumann Lúthchleas Gael An Spidéal, with Gaelic football and hurling being the most popular sports. There is also a sailing club in the village.

== Notable people ==
- Mary Bergin, musician
- Ronan Browne, musician
- Thom McGinty, actor and stillness artist
- Michael Morris, 3rd Baron Killanin, journalist and the sixth president of the International Olympic Committee, had family connections to the area.
- Máirtín Ó Cadhain, writer of modern literature in Irish, and author of the comic and modernist work Cré na Cille.
- Dónall Ó Héalai, actor
- Seán Ó Neachtain, former Member of the European Parliament and Fianna Fáil party politician
- Eimear Ní Chonaola, journalist and broadcast news presenter
- Máire Ní Thuathail (1957–2016), television producer.
- Gráinne Seoige, television presenter
- Síle Seoige, television presenter
- Máirtín Thornton (died 1984), heavyweight boxer in the 1940s

== See also ==
- List of towns and villages in Ireland
