= Taibhdhearc na Gaillimhe =

Theatre for works in the Irish language

Coordinates: 53.27198°N 9.05255°W

An Taibhdhearc
- Interactive map of An Taibhdhearc
- Address: 19 Middle Street; Galway; Ireland
- Type: Irish language

Construction
- Opened: 1928

Website
- http://www.antaibhdhearc.com

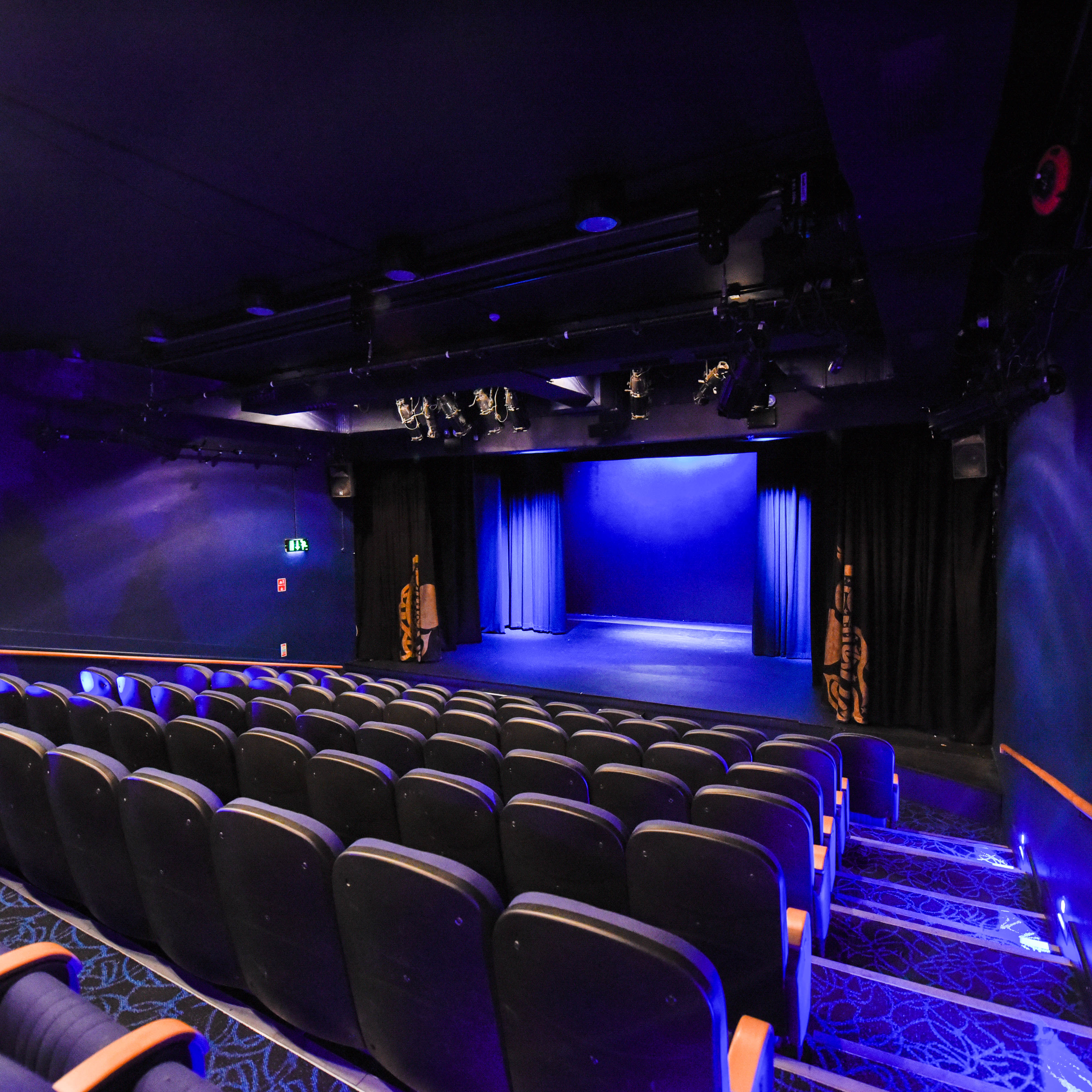
Amharclann Náisiúnta na Gaeilge, interior.

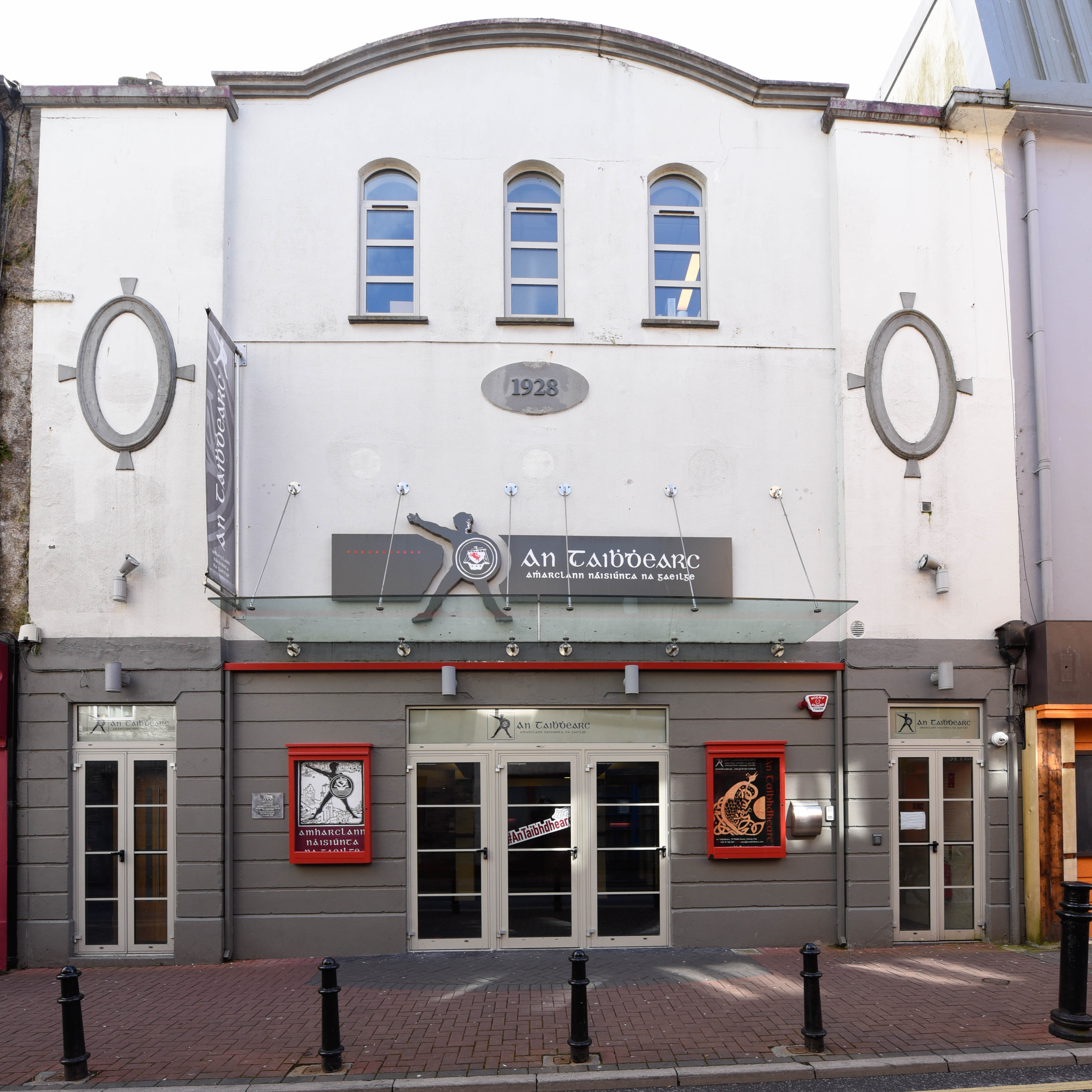

An Taibhdhearc is the national Irish language theatre of Ireland. It was founded in 1928.

The word taibhdhearc means "ghostly vision", from, "taibhse" meaning ghost, and "dearcadh" meaning "view".

An Taibhdhearc is situated at 19 Middle Street, within the medieval city of Galway. It is built on the ruins of the city's original Augustinian friary. The rear wall incorporates a wall from this friary, including some carved stone window frames.

The theatre is used for drama and music productions, and occasionally screens international films. The busiest period for the arts in Galway city each year is the two weeks of the annual Galway International Arts Festival.

== Beginnings ==
The theatre opened on 27 August 1928, staging Micheál Mac Liammóir's Diarmuid agus Gráinne, with Earnán de Blaghd, Pádraic Ó Conaire, and Lady Gregory in attendance. A grant of IRE£600, was used to make it happen.

== Hiatus ==
After suffering extensive smoke damage during a fire in 2007, An Taibhdhearc closed its doors for an extended period of renovation and refurbishment. While the theatre was closed, An Taibhdhearc continued to produce shows in other venues around Galway city and county. The theatre was re-opened by President of Ireland, Michael D. Higgins in September 2012.

== Modern activities ==
The theatre continues to stage drama premieres. The theatre has hosted poetry and music performances, as well as film screenings. The theatre hosts events as part of the Cúirt International Festival of Literature.

In 2024, the theatre was award a €6m grant to support the Irish language productions, and a public call was made for new board members.

== See also ==
- Amharclann Ghaoth Dobhair
- Bailte Seirbhísí Gaeltachta
- Coiste Cearta Síbialta na Gaeilge
- Gaeltacht
- Líonraí Gaeilge
- Údarás na Gaeltachta
