= Ros na Rún =

Irish-language television soap opera (since 1996)

- Genre: Soap opera
- Directed by: Various
- Starring: Cast list
- Country of origin: Ireland
- Original language: Irish
- No. of seasons: 29
- No. of episodes: 2,000

Production
- Executive producers: Patricia Carroll; Siobhán Ní Ghadra
- Production locations: An Spidéal, County Galway
- Running time: 25 minutes
- Production companies: Tyrone Productions; EO Teilifís

Original release
- Network: TG4
- Release: 3 November 1996 – present

Related
- Na Rúin

Ros na Rún (pronounced [ˌɾˠɔsˠ n̪ˠə ˈɾˠuːnˠ]) is an Irish soap opera produced for the Irish-language television channel TG4. The series is set in a fictional village called Ros na Rún, located near to An Spidéal, where the series is filmed. It focuses on the domestic and professional lives of its residents.

Ros na Rún has been praised for its tackling of realistic and socially challenging storylines, which got it dubbed "the Wild West". It has dealt with many different storylines, including domestic violence, infidelity, theft, arson, abortion, homosexuality, adoption, murder, rape, drugs, teen pregnancy and paedophilia. The series is broadcast with English subtitles.

== Background ==
Ros na Rún was originally devised by RTÉ producers Con Bushe and Antoine Ó Flatharta in response to the upcoming centenary of the Gaelic League, with the network deciding upon an Irish language drama as a contribution towards the commemoration of the event. The show originally transmitted on RTÉ One in 1992 as a pilot series of twelve minute episodes, though was subsequently discontinued. Ros na Rún was later revived as an expanded production for the network launch of Teilifís na Gaeilge (now TG4), first airing on the night of 3 November 1996. The episode filmed scenes in Galway, Dublin and London. The title plays on the double meaning of the Irish word rún, which has a basic meaning of 'secret' but also has a long history as a term of endearment, similar to "honey", "sweetheart", or "darling". Ros can mean either "a wood or wooded headland" or "a headland or promontory", so the title can mean either "Wood/Headland of the Secrets" or "Wood/Headland of the Sweethearts".

== Storylines ==
The show begins following the death of Old Jack Padráig, presumed to not have left behind a will. His niece Rita O’Connor prepares to move her family from Dublin into her uncle's home in Ros na Rún only to find that her cousin Jack Hayes is already occupying the property, leading to a family dispute over its inheritance. Surrounding the circumstances of Old Jack's death is seedy local publican Tadhg Ó Direáin, who Rita recalls being raped by on the night of her hen party seventeen years ago. Rita's son Jason is devastated when he learns that Tadhg is his biological father, though the two later establish a relationship. Other early storylines include the O'Connor family struggling to settle into their new lives in Ros na Rún, along with the closure of the Mil Rí Chocolate Factory's effect on the local job economy. Robbie Lynch deals with grief over the accidental death of his sister Yvonne, while Jack and his partner Tom Doherty face scrutiny as a gay couple as they attempt to start a local business and care for Tom's infant nephew. An affair between Tom and veterinarian Owen Collins leads to the first on-screen gay kiss broadcast on TV in Ireland, which made headlines across the country. Berni Ní Neachtain marries her sweetheart Liam Ó Conghaile under dubious circumstances, but their marriage dissolves over Liam's immaturity and her own reputation after her brother Andy attempts to rob Liam's parents Peadar and Máire at gunpoint. Upon Liam's departure, Berni learns that she is pregnant and struggles with becoming a single parent and postpartum depression after the birth of her son Evan. The town mourns the sudden death of Tadhg's infant daughter, but he later discovers that the child was conceived through an affair between his wife Angela and employee Micheál Seoighe.

During the 2000s, Tadhg attempts revenge on Micheál by sabotaging his petrol pumps, but the act inadvertently kills Robbie and Seán Brennan and starts a chain of events that leads to Tadhg being forced to temporarily part with his share in the pub. The machinations of drug lord Jim O’Dowd destroys the lives of his wife Ríona De Búrca, her brother Donnacha, and his blackmailed associate Daniel McLoughlin. Micheál is incarcerated after he assists his cancer-stricken wife Pauline with euthanasia, but is later released with O’Dowd's assistance. Following the death of her adopted father, local teenager Mo Gilmartin struggles to accept that Sergeant Úna Ní Riain is her birth mother. The mental deterioration of Berni's fiancé Dr. Cathal Hennessy leads to his attempt to kill her in a murder-suicide, but she is rescued when Cathal is thwarted and killed by Evan. Tadhg is visited by his illegitimate son Eoin, possessing a vendetta that culminates into Eoin locking Tadhg inside a coffin and setting it ablaze. The show pays tribute to the character of series original Séamus Ó Catháin following the passing of actor Diarmuid Mac An Adhastair.

Following the show's 20th season, Andy returns to the series attempting to extort money by kidnapping Tadhg and Frances's daughter Áine for ransom and nearly strangles his estranged wife Bobbi-Lee to death, but is later acquitted by jury over lack of evidence. A major conflict between sisters Katy and Dee Daly begins when Dee discovers that her husband Mack Ó Riain is unwittingly the biological father of Katy's child, occurring from a one-night stand that happened prior to their marriage. Dee takes desperate measures to hide the truth from Mack including becoming pregnant herself and undermining Katy's sanity, with the storyline intended to highlight the effects of gaslighting upon its victims. When Mack discovers Dee's deceit, she spites him by abducting their daughter and flees the country for over a year before returning to make amends. Burdened with guilt for her responsibility in Frances's accidental death, Mo confesses her complicity to Tadhg and quietly departs Ros na Rún, causing strife with her estranged husband Colm Gallagher upon her return three years later. Berni suffers a tumultuous relationship with Briain McDonagh and becomes pregnant with his child after he forces himself upon her; Briain later returns to abduct his daughter and is ultimately killed at gunpoint by corrupt Garda Diana Ní Cheallaigh. When a deal by Diana is witnessed by radio reporter Sonia Ní Dhubhghaill, Diana attempts to silence her by pushing her from a roof and frames Mack for the attack, though discreetly assists his legal defense when the two become close. Pharmacist Cyril Harkin is disgraced after being revealed as a sexual predator and enters Tigh Thaidhg with a gun; the following skirmish results in the death of Niall Breathnach and trauma amongst the other participants.

== Na Rúin ==
On 13 September 2011, TG4 launched a ten-part online spinoff series, titled Na Rúin (The Secrets). The miniseries took on the theme of mystery, when 16-year-old Ciara goes missing. Lorcán finds himself in the frame for her murder, despite his protests of his innocence. The viewer had to read the blogs of Rachel, her roommate and Lorcán, as well as watch video diaries detailing the thoughts of each character about the disappearance to solve the mystery.

== Satire & cameos ==
In 2005, John Finn, Kathryn Morris and Jeremy Ratchford from Cold Case appeared in a satirical promo for both Cold Case and Ros na Rún for TG4. The commercial won a gold medal in the "Best Drama Promos" category of the 2007 Sharks International Advertising Awards Festival of Ireland (Sharks Awards). The promotion features both John Finn and Kathryn Morris in character interrogating a murder suspect from TG4 soap Ros na Rún played by Peadar Cox who refuses to speak in English, both detectives then begin talking in Irish much to the surprise of Jeremy Ratchford's character, the promo tied in with a murder investigation in Ros na Rún. TG4 also ran a similar promo for Nip/Tuck, where Séamus is seen cycling through the country side supporting a brand new pair of breasts.

Ros na Rún has welcomed many special guests since its inception, including Daniel O’Donnell, Nathan Carter Francis Brennan and Stephen Fry. Most recently, U.S. talkshow host Conan O’Brien featured in a cameo where he played a balloon delivery man.
