= Gormgal =

Irish monaastic settlement builder

Gormgal of Ardoileán, Connemara, died 1017/1018.

== Biography ==
Gormgal is credited with building a number of monastic settlements in the late 10th century. Noted as an anchorite of exceptional sanctity, he made Ardoileán (High Island) famous, so much so that in 1014 Brian Boru visited High Island to make his confession to him. A well on the island is named after Brian.

Gormgal's monastery ceased to exist sometime in the following centuries but High Island remained a destination for pilgrims. His feast day is 5 August.

== See also ==
- Féchín of Fore died 665.
- Enda of Aran, died c. 530.
- Ceannanach, missionary, fl. c. 490-500?
- Gillagori Ua Dubhacan, Abbot of Aran, died 1167.
