= Gilla an Choimded Ó Duillénnáin =

13th-century Irish church official

ce

Gilla an Choimded Ó Duillénnáin (died 1229/30) was an Irish cleric.

Ó Duillénnáin was a coarb or erenagh of Saint Feichin, though at what foundation is uncertain. Places connected with Féchín's cult include: Fore Abbey (Co. Westmeath), Cong Abbey (Co. Mayo), Omey Island (Co. Galway), Ardoilén/High Island (Co. Galway), Inishmaan (Co. Galway), Claddaghduff (Co. Galway), Cleggan (Co. Galway) and Termonfeckin (Co. Louth).

The Annals of Connacht record his death, sub anno 1229:

- Gilla an Choimded O Duillennain, coarb of St. Fechin ... died.

The Annals of Ulster contain more detail:

- U1230.6 Gilla-in-Coimdedh Ua Duillennain, successor of St. Feichin and abbot of the Monastery of Canons of Es-dara, rested in Christ.
