= Renvyle =

Place in County Galway, Ireland

Renvyle Rinn Mhaoile
- Electoral division
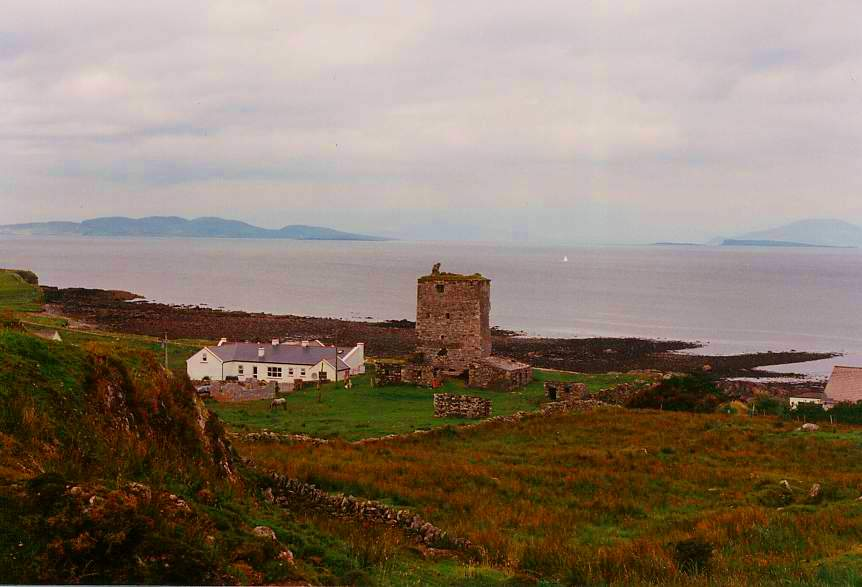
- Renvyle Castle
- Country: Ireland
- Province: Connacht
- County: Galway
- Established: 1785

Renvyle or Rinvyle (Irish: Rinn Mhaoile, meaning 'bald peninsula') is a peninsula and electoral division in northwest Connemara in County Galway, close to the border with County Mayo in Ireland.

== History ==
The ruins of the castle of Grace O'Malley (Gráinne Mhaol) can be found on the peninsula's western fringe. Close by, in Cashleen, is the ruined medieval Church of the Seven Daughters which was named after the Seven Sisters of Renvyle who preached in the area.

== Geography ==
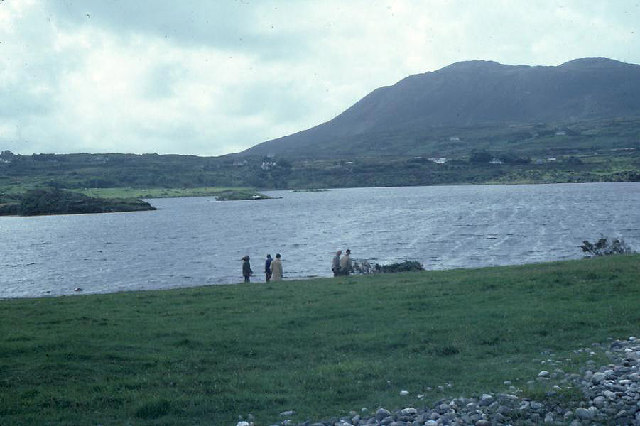
Tully Mountain and Renvyle Lough. Looking south from the shingle bank that separate the lough from the ocean.

Renvyle is surrounded on three sides by the Atlantic Ocean and by the Dawros river on the other side. It contains the villages of Tully and Tully Cross. Renvyle is situated in the parish of Ballinakill and historically was part of the barony of Ballynahinch. The villages of Leenane and Letterfrack are close by and Clifden is the nearest town, lying 12 miles (19 km) to the south.

The peninsula is dominated by Letter Hill (also known as Tully Mountain) which is 356m high. The Twelve Bens Mountains are also visible, as is Mweelrea, the largest mountain in Connacht. The islands of Inishturk, Inishbofin, Crump, and Freachoileán lie off the rugged coastline.

== Amenities ==
Located in a tourist area, local facilities include a pharmacy, three primary schools, several hotels and B&Bs, a post office, supermarket and other shops, church, community centre, credit union, several pubs, horse-riding, golf course and a crèche. Several festivals take place in the area including the Connemara Mussel Festival, Bog Week and Sea Week.

Kylemore Abbey is also two miles away and was the main place of education for teenage girls in the area until it was closed (as a school) in 2010. Secondary school students now generally attend Clifden Community School or Coláiste Naomh Feichín, Corr na Móna. There are three national schools in the area, namely Eagle's Nest NS, Tully NS and Lettergesh NS.

Renvyle GAA, Gráinne Mhaoils and West Coast United are some of the sporting teams based in the vicinity.

== Renvyle House ==
Renvyle House, now a hotel, is situated in Rusheenduff in West Renvyle. It was originally single storey, with an extra storey added in the mid-19th century. The timber used in the building of the house extension was said to have been from a shipwreck in the bay. It was initially the home of the Anglo-Irish Blake family who were landlords and owned the peninsula as far as Lettergesh East in the 19th century. The house was sold before the Irish War of Independence to surgeon, poet, novelist and senator Oliver St. John Gogarty. It was burned to the ground during the Irish Civil War in 1923 by the anti-Treaty IRA, as were many other homes of Irish Free State supporters. The house was rebuilt by Gogarty as a hotel in the 1930s.

One of Marconi's first radio receiving stations was built at Tooreena on the peninsula and operated for a short time.

== Seven Sisters of Renvyle ==
The Seven Sisters of Renvyle were medieval Irish people, said to be the daughters of a King of Leinster, or a chief of Omey Island. They preached along the coast of Conmhaicne Mara, lending their names to holy wells at Renvyle, Cleggan, Aillebrack, Doon Hill, Mweenish Island and a cursing stone. Writing in A Guide To Lough Corrib's Early Monastic Sites, Anthony Previté suggests that they finally settled on Mason Island.

The medieval church at Renvyle Point, Teampaill na Seacht nInion, is dedicated to them. It is said to have been built in thanks by a king for the cures his seven daughters received from the waters of a nearby well. Grace O'Malley at one point lived in a nearby castle.

== See also ==
- Scaithin
- Ríoch
- Ceannanach
- Mathias of Inis Ní

== Sources ==
- A Guide to Connemara's Early Christian Sites, Anthony Previté, Oughterard, 2008. ISBN 978 0 9560062 0 2
