= List of towns and villages in County Galway =

List of towns and villages in a county of Ireland

This is a list of towns and villages in County Galway, Ireland.

== A ==
- Ahascragh
- Ardrahan
- Athenry
- Aughrim

== B ==
- Ballinasloe
- Ballinderreen
- Ballyconneely
- Ballygar
- Ballymacward
- Ballymoe
- Ballynahinch
- Barna
- Bealadangan
- Belclare
- Bullaun

== C ==
- Camus
- Carna
- Carnmore
- Carraroe
- Casla
- Castleblakeney
- Castlegar
- Claregalway
- Clarinbridge
- Cleggan
- Clifden
- Clonbur
- Clonfert
- Corofin
- Corrandulla
- Corr na Móna
- Craughwell

== D ==
- Dunmore

== E ==
- Eyrecourt

== F ==
- Furbo

== G ==
- Glenamaddy
- Gort

== H ==
- Headford

== I ==
- Inverin

== K ==
- Kilcolgan
- Kilconly
- Kilconnell
- Kilkerrin
- Kilkieran
- Killimor
- Kilronan
- Kiltormer
- Kiltullagh
- Kinvara

== L ==
- Laurencetown
- Leenaun
- Letterfrack
- Lettermore
- Loughrea

== M ==
- Maam Cross
- Maum
- Menlough
- Milltown
- Monivea
- Mountbellew
- Moycullen

== N ==
- Newbridge
- New Inn

== O ==
- Oranmore
- Oughterard

== P ==
- Peterswell
- Portumna

== R ==
- Recess
- Rosmuck
- Rossaveal
- Roundstone

== S ==
- Skehana
- Spiddal

== T ==
- Tully
- Tully Cross
- Tuam
- Turloughmore

== W ==
- Williamstown
- Woodford
