= Omey (civil parish) =

Omey Iomaí
- Civil parish
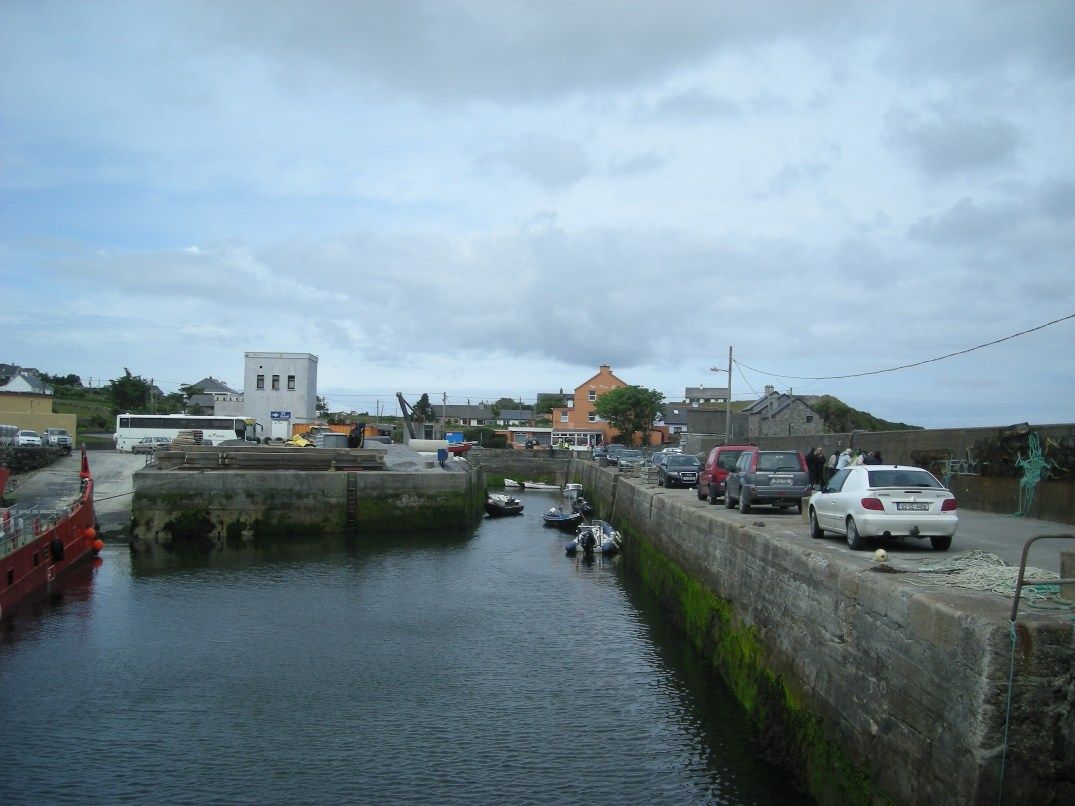
- Cleggan harbour

- Location of Omey within County Galway in Ireland
- Coordinates: 53°32′50″N 10°09′11″W
- Country: Ireland
- Province: Connacht
- County: County Galway

Omey (Irish: Iomaí) is a civil parish in County Galway, Ireland.

Omey is one of 5 civil parishes in the barony of Ballynahinch in the Province of Connacht. The civil parish covers 85.9 acres (0.348 km^{2}).

Omey civil parish comprises 72 townlands, which are listed as follows: Aillenaveagh, Ardmore, Ardmore Island, Atticlogh, Attigoddaun, Aughrus Beg, Aughrus More, Ballymaconry, Barnahallia, Barnanoraun, Belleek, Boolard, Boolard Island, Cartoorbeg, Claddaghduff, Clifden, Clifden Demesne, Cloghaunard, Cloon, Coolacloy, Couravoughil, Courhoor, Cregg, Cruagh, Cushatrough, Derreen, Doon, Eashal Island, Emlagh, Eyrephort, Fahy, Fakeeragh, Friar Island, Gannoughs, Glen, Glenbrickeen, Gooreen, Gooreenatinny, Gortrummagh, Grallagh, High Island, Hog Island, Inishturk, Kill, Knocakavilra, Knockavally, Knockbaun, Knockbrack, Laghtanabba, Leagaun, Letterdeen, Letternoosh, Lettershanna, Loughauna, Malthooa, Maw, Moorneen, Patches, Roeillaun, Rossadilisk, Rusheen, Shanakeever, Shinnanagh, Streamstown, Sturrakeen, Tievebaun, Tooraskeheen, Tooreen, Townaloughra, Trean, Tullyvoheen, and Turbot Island.
