= Cleggan Bay =

Ocean bay in County Galway, Ireland

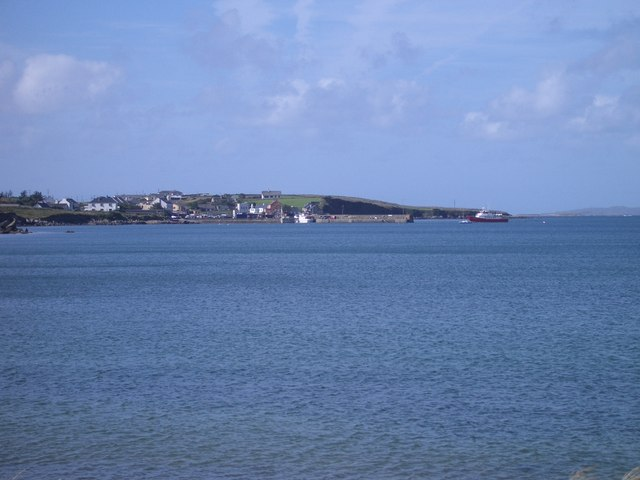
- Cleggan Bay, looking towards Cleggan

- Location within Ireland
- Location: County Galway
- Coordinates: 53°33′50″N 10°7′00″W
- Ocean/sea sources: Atlantic Ocean
- Basin countries: Ireland
- Settlements: Cleggan

Cleggan Bay (Irish: Cuan na Cloigeann) is a natural ocean bay in County Galway, Ireland.

== Geography ==
Cleggan Bay is opened between Cleggan Head (on its north side) and Rossadilsk strand, in the Aughrus Peninsula (south). On the western side of the bay are located Inishbofin and Inishark islands.

== History ==
Near Cleggan bay is a collection of prehistoric monuments (tombs, standing stones and walls); quite well known among them is the Cleggan Court tomb, on the north side of the bay.

In October 1927, in what became known as the Cleggan Bay Disaster, 26 local fishermen drowned during a storm in Cleggan Bay. A nearby village lost several people and was subsequently abandoned. Nine men from Inishbofin and other men from County Mayo were also lost. The disaster is remembered in stories, poems and on stone markers.

== Transport ==
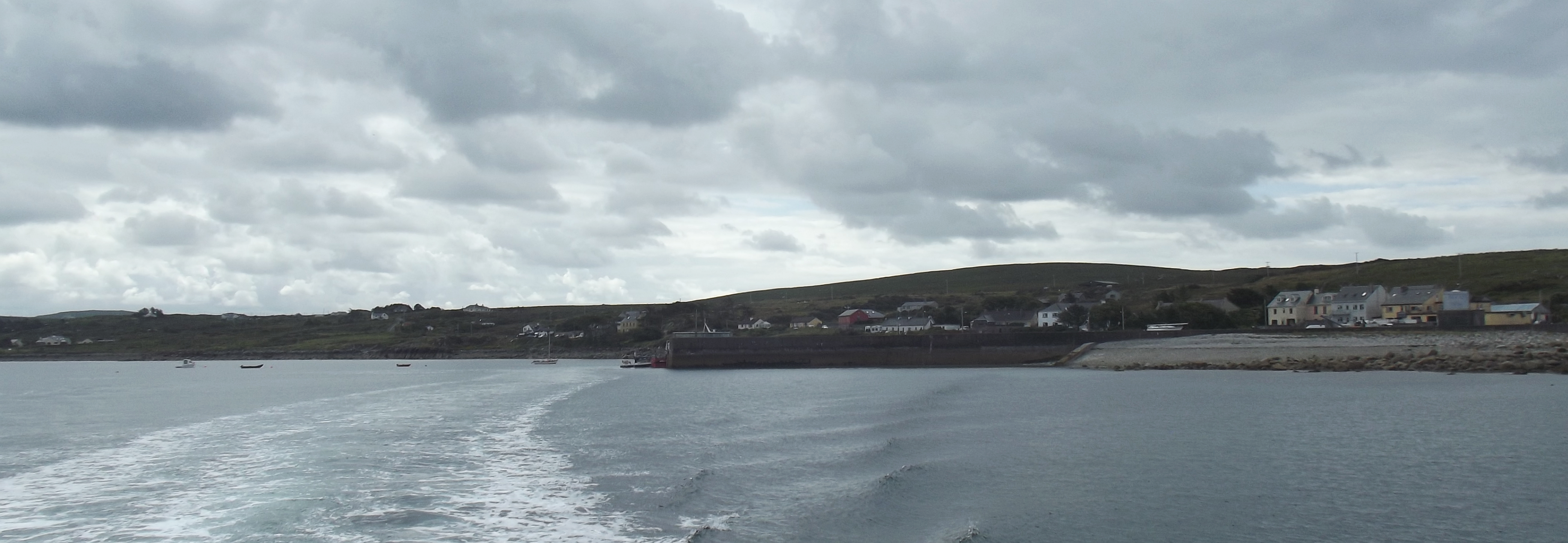
View from the ferry to Inishbofin

Cleggan is reached by R379 road. From Cleggan pier, built in 1822 and extended in 1908, ferries leave daily for Inishbofin (Galway), and there is also a ferry to Inishturk.

== Hiking ==
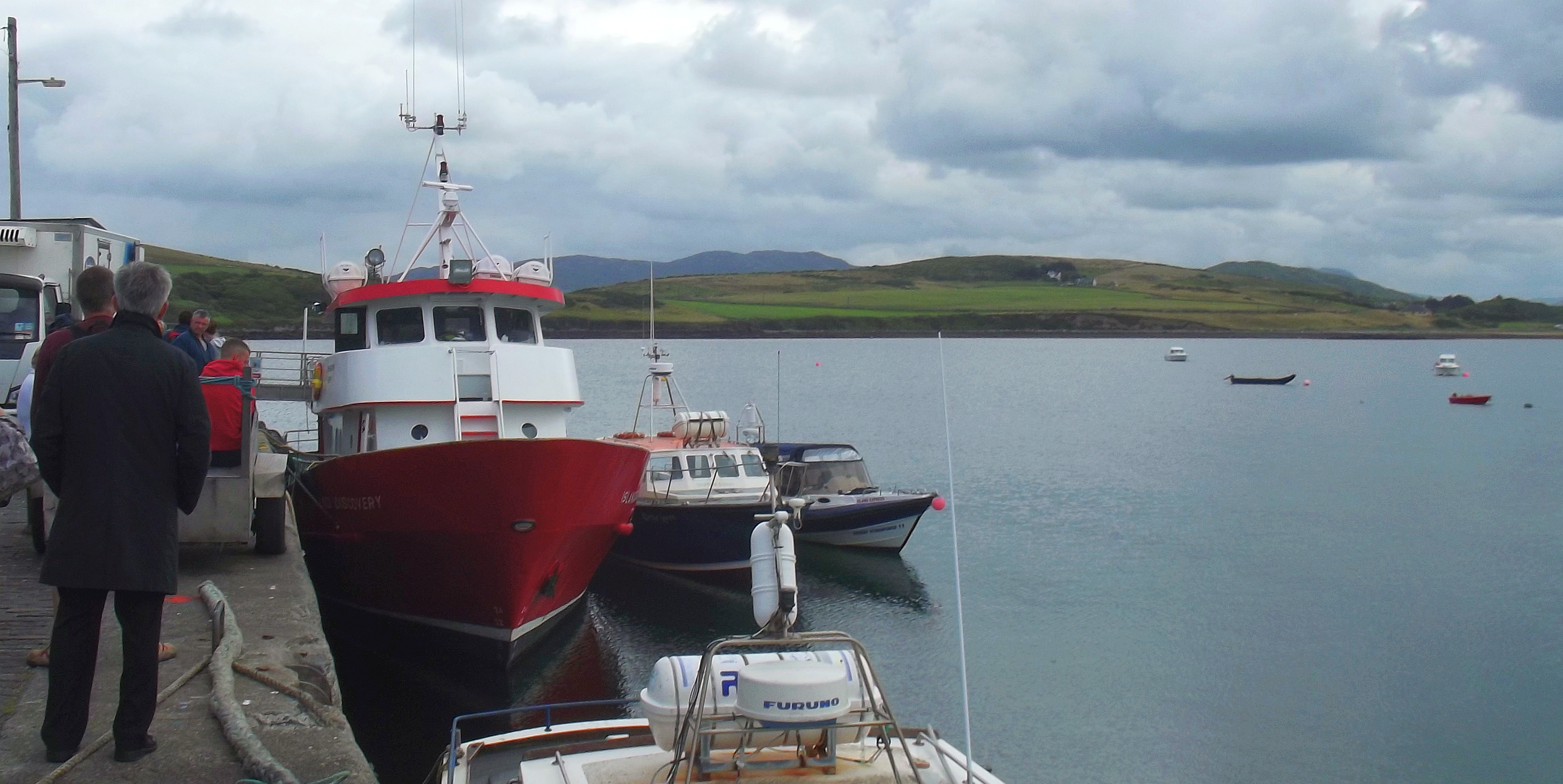
The bay from Cleggan pier

On the north side of the bay the Cleggan Head walk allow hikers to visit the area and crossing some private properties.

Cleggan bay is also concerned by the Mayo to Clare section of the Wild Atlantic Way.

== See also ==
- Wild Atlantic Way
