= Gormgal of Ardoileán =

Irish cleric

Gormgal of Ardoileán (died 1017) was an Irish cleric.

The monastery of Ardoileán, off the west coast of Ireland, was founded by Feichin in 664. It is now gone but on its site at High Island sits a medieval church.

The monastery continued until at least the early 12th century, when the Annals of Ulster under the year 1017 state Gormgal of Int Ardailéan, chief confessor of Ireland, rested in Christ.

One of the important manuscripts of the Life of St. Feichin was written on the island.

== See also ==
- Féchín of Fore died 665.
- Enda of Aran, died c. 530.
- Ceannanach, missionary, fl. c. 490-500?
- Gillagori Ua Dubhacan, Abbot of Aran, died 1167.
