= Ardoileán =

Island in Galway, Ireland

High Island
Native name: Ardoileán
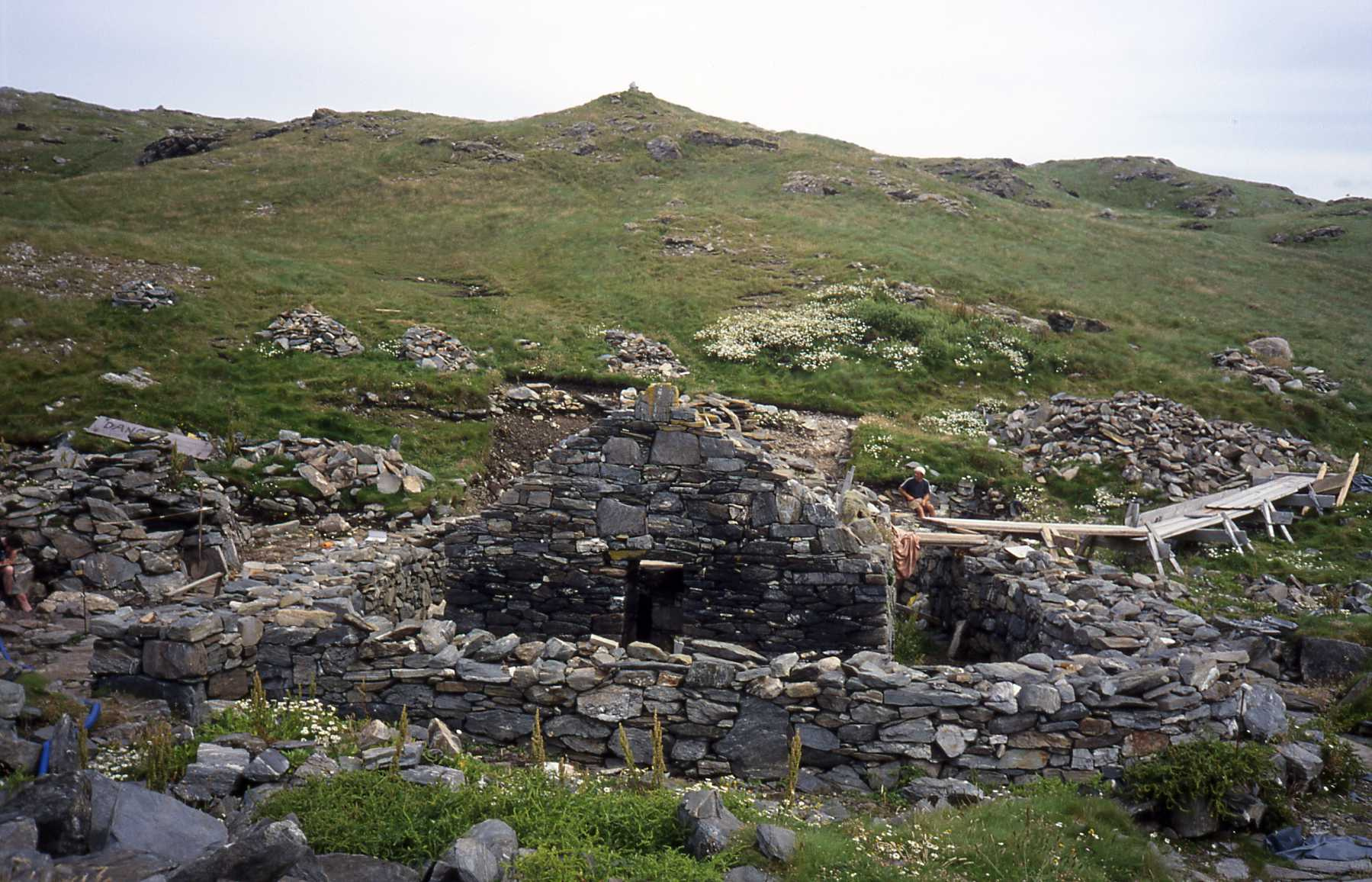
- Ardoileán early medieval ecclesiastical site

- Location within island of Ireland

Geography
- Location: Atlantic Ocean
- Coordinates: 53.5464°N 10.2572°W

Administration
- Ireland
- Province: Connacht
- County: Galway

Demographics
- Population: 0

Ardoileán or Ard Oileán, known in English as High Island (a translation of the Irish name), is a small island off the northwest coast of Connemara in County Galway, Ireland. It was once the site of an early Irish monastic community.

== Hermitage ==
It is one of thirty-odd islands off the west coast of Ireland, between Inishtrahull and Clear Island, which were settled by hermits and monastic communities in the early Christian period. Other such islands in the direct vicinity of Ardoiléan include Clare Island, Chapel Island, Caher Island, Inishturk, Inishbofin and Inishark. Since (at least) the seventh century, Ardoiléan had been the site of an early monastery or hermitage, reputedly founded by St Féchín of Fore (d. 665).

Above the south landing-place, near the remains of the monastery, there is a Christian cross-slab dating perhaps to the seventh century.

== Modern history ==
Between 1969 and 1998, the island was in the possession of Irish poet Richard Murphy, then a resident of Inishbofin. In personal memoirs published by Granta in The Kick (2002), Murphy remembers the opportunity when the previous owner considered selling the island: "I got excited at the thought of buying this inaccessible holy island, restoring the beehive cells and oratory of its derelict hermitage and preserving the place from destruction either by tourists or by sheep."

In February 2019, the island was put up for sale for €1.25 million by Spencer Auctioneers.

== See also ==
- Gormgal of Ardoileán
- Caolánn, fl. 7th century.
- Mocán
- Seven Sisters of Renvyle

== Secondary sources ==
- Herity, Michael. "The Hermitage on Ardoileán, Co Galway." Journal of the Royal Society of the Antiquaries of Ireland 120 (1990). pp. 65–101.
- Macalister, R.A.S. "The Antiquities of Ard Oilean, Co. Galway." Journal of the Royal Society of the Antiquaries of Ireland 26 (1896). pp. 196–210.
