= Rossadillisk =

Townland in County Galway, Ireland

Rossadilisk (Irish: Ros an Duilisc) is a townland in the civil parish of Omey in County Galway Ireland.

The townland is located to the east of Cleggan and north of Claddaghduff, on the Atlantic coast. The townland was devastated by the 1927 Cleggan Bay Disaster which saw the death of 45 local fishermen. The townland has largely been deserted since then.
