= Leo of Inis Airc =

Early Medieval Irish Christian saint

Leo of Inis Airc was an early medieval Irish Christian saint.

== Biography ==
Inishark lies south-west of Inishbofin, Galway and was inhabited up to 1960. Leo is the patron saint of the island, and responsible for perhaps the first Christian settlement on the island. He lived in the 7th century.

A church which is reputed to have been founded by Leo, now in ruins, is called Teampaill Leo. It features a stone cross, known as Leac Leo. On the nearby south shore is Uaimh Leo, a cave where he is said to have prayed and meditated. Clochán Leo is a large Beehive hut in a stone enclosure.

A 19th-century church was erected on the site of his monastery.

His feast day was originally 11 April but later celebrated on 10 November.

== See also ==
- Guairim of Inisbofin
- Colmán of Lindisfarne (c. 605–18 February 675)
- Féchín of Fore (d. 665).
