= Dessie O'Halloran =

Irish singer and musician (1940–2019)

- Born: 29 August 1940; Inishbofin, County Galway, Ireland
- Died: 28 September 2019 (aged 79); Salthill, County Galway, Ireland
- Occupations: Singer; Musician
- Years active: 2001–2019

Desmond O'Halloran (29 August 1940 – 28 September 2019) was an Irish singer and musician.

== Biography ==
A native of Inishbofin, O'Halloran emigrated to the United Kingdom in the 1950s, where he enjoyed regular success as a singer at the All-Britain championships. Returning to Inishbofin in the mid-1980s, O'Halloran joined the island's céilí band, with whom many visiting musicians would sit in, as well as playing at sessions on the island.

He gained chart success in 2001 with "Say You Love Me", which reached No. 4 on the Irish charts, and was later re-released as a remix. The song was taken from the Sharon Shannon album, The Diamond Mountain Sessions.

His 70th birthday party, held in Fagan's Bar, Hotel Meyrick, Eyre Square, Galway, on 29 August 2010, was attended by musicians such as Sharon Shannon, Joe Burke, Anne Conroy Burke, Frankie Gavin, Matt Keane, Mary Staunton, Tommy McCarthy, Mick Crehan, Gerry Hanley, Rosie Stewart and Dick Hogan.

O'Halloran performed with either Sharon Shannon's Big Band or the Fuaim Chonamara show by the Cuningham dancing family during the years he was active.

O'Halloran died on 28 September 2019.

== See also ==
- Clann Fhergail
- Crichaireacht cinedach nduchasa Muintiri Murchada
- Martin O'Halloran, member of County Galway Land League, fl. 1879–1881

== Discography ==
- The Men of the Island, Topic 12TS 305, 1975.
- The Dear Little Isle with the Inishbofin Céilí Band
- The Diamond Mountain Sessions, with Sharon Shannon, 2000.
- The Pound Road, Daisy, 2001.
