= Guairim of Inisbofin =

Guairim of Inisbofin (fl. 7th century) was chief of Inishbofin, Galway.

== Biography ==
Little is known of Guairim. He is said to have been a contemporary of Colmán of Lindisfarne who founded a monastery on the island in 665. A site adjacent to the harbour on some old maps was called 'Guairim's Castle'; the presbytery is now located there. Another site, listed on the Ordnance Survey maps as Áit Tigh Ghuairim was located in the townland of Bunamullen. Stones from it were taken to build the parochial house.

Guairim is supposed to have murdered six of Colmán's monks at Clossy Road, "over a question of tithes."

Traditional lore, used to tell of blood flowing from the earth at this site. Guairim was taken to Renvyle and tried, then chained to a rock at low tide and left to drown.

== See also ==
- Seven Sisters of Renvyle
- Ceannanach
