= Ceannanach =

Saint Ceannanach (or Gregory Ceannanach)
- Born: 'Gregory' unknown year
- Hometown: Iararna, Aran Islands
- Residence: Cleggan, Galway
- Died: c. 4th/5th century Galway
- Cause of death: martyred by beheading by an Irish chieftain
- Venerated in: Catholic Church, Eastern Orthodox Church
- Major shrine: Inishmaan (his body is said to be interred there)
- Feast: 10 March
- Attributes: martyrs palm
- Patronage: Cleggan County Galway, Ireland, missionaries

Gregory Ceannanach, early Irish missionary, fl. c. 490-500?

== Biography ==
Ceannanach's original name is said to have been Gregory, the former name only associated with him after his death.

He was a very early Christian missionary who worked in what is now called Connemara in the late 5th/early 6th centuries. He may be associated with the western mission of Saint Patrick. He is believed to have been a native of Iararna to the south east of the Aran Islands but he might also have been a foreign missionary associated with St. Patrick or St. Palladius.

Places associated with him include An Cartrún, Baile na Cille, some three km north of Cleggan. A medieval church set within traces of a rectangular enclosure is dedicated to him. A second church dedicated to him is located on Inishmore, which, according to Previte, "is considered to be one of the most ancient and perfect of all the ecclesiastical remains on the island".

From him is also said to derive the name Gregory's Sound, the sea passage between Inishmore and Inishmaan.

== Folklore ==
In the parish of Ballinakill it is believed that Ceannanach's mission was the first in this part of Ireland, which was still pagan. The tradition stated that this infuriated a local king, who seized him and had him beheaded close to the eastern extremity of Cleggan. Lore has it that he then picked up his head and took it to the Holy Well in Clooncree where he washed it before lying down to die.

From this incident the village is supposed to derive its name, although An Cloigeann (meaning head or skull), apparently refers to a coastal headland. Gregory's new name, Ceannach, also seems to be derived from this.

A heap of stones pointed out as the site of his death.

== Veneration ==
Ceannanach is one of only a handful of early Irish saints to have been martyred in Ireland. Tradition states that he is buried on Inishmaan, one of the Aran Islands. He purportedly founded a church on that island. A holy well in Clooncree, County Galway is also named after him, called St. Gregory's well.

== See also ==
- Guairim of Inisbofin
- Mathias of Inis Ní
- Mocán
- Gormgal of Ardoileán, died. 1017/1018.
