= Ailerán =

Irish scholar and saint

Saint Ailerán
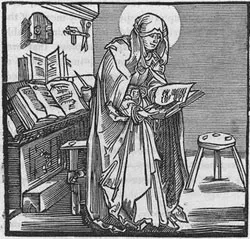
- Residence: Ireland
- Died: 29 December 664
- Feast: 29 December
- Major works: Ancestry of Our Lord Jesus Christ

Ailerán, also known as Ailerán Sapiens (Ailerán the Wise) was an Irish scholar and saint who died on 29 December 664 or 665. His feast day is 29 December.

== Biography ==
Ailerán was one of the most distinguished scholars at the School of Clonard in the 7th century. His early life is not recorded, but he was attracted to Clonard by the fame of St. Finnián and his various disciples. He became a lector of the school in 650. He died of the Yellow Plague, and his death is recorded in the Annals of Ulster. Because of his knowledge of the works of Origen, Philo, St. Jerome, St. Augustine, and others, he was well versed in patristic literature.

== Works ==
According to John Colgan, numerous works can be ascribed to Ailerán, including the Fourth Life of Saint Patrick, a Latin litany, and the Lives of Saint Brigid and Saint Féichín of Fore. Ailerán's best known work is his Mystical Interpretation of the Ancestry of Our Lord Jesus Christ, according to the genealogy of Jesus in Saint Matthew's Gospel. This was published in the Benedictine edition of the Fathers, and the editors said that they published it although Aileran was not a Benedictine, because he " unfoulded the meaning of the Sacred Scripture with so much learning and ingenuity that every student of the Sacred Volume and especially preachers of the Divine Word will regard the publication as most acceptable." Another work of his is titled A Short Moral Explanation of the Sacred Names, which could be a fragment of a larger work.
