= Ballynakill Lough =

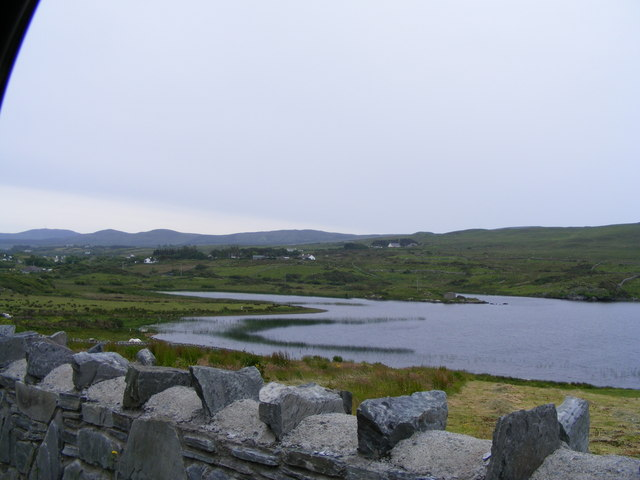

- Location in Ireland
- Location: County Galway
- Coordinates: 53.5553°N 10.0517°W
- Type: Lake
- Basin countries: Ireland

Ballynakill Lough is a lake in Connemara, County Galway, Ireland. The lake is fed by a short stream connected to the nearby Atlantic Ocean. Tooreen Bog is located on the lakes south coast. The village of Cleggan is located to the west.
