= Tully, County Galway =

Settlement in Ireland

Coordinates: 53.596°N 9.975°W

Tully (Irish: An Tulaigh, "the hill") is a small village on the Renvyle Peninsula in north-west Connemara, County Galway, Ireland. It is situated on the Wild Atlantic Way coastal route.

== Amenities ==
Tully contains a post office, a hardware shop, a supermarket, a doctor's surgery, a pharmacy, a community centre, and a music house (Teach Ceoil), as well as a horse-riding centre. The village is a quarter of a mile from the sea and has views over the Atlantic Ocean. The Twelve Pins mountain range looms large over the area. The Renvyle House Hotel, former home of poet Oliver St. John Gogarty, lies a mile to the west. Tully's sister village, Tully Cross, is a mile to the east. The nearest town is Clifden, which is thirteen miles to the south.

== Famine ==
In 1881 the landowner Caroline Blake was in dispute with her tenants. She believed that her tenants were exaggerating the famine caused by crop failure. The Land League were instructing the population to refuse to pay a full rent to the landlord and punishing any who did. It was said (by Blake) that a meeting in Tully Cross church had discussed finding £5 to pay someone to kill her. She responded by having 109 people evicted from the village in September 1881. Over the next few years the rents charged were reduced by the Land Court and Grant's inclome was so reduced that she had to open Renvyle House as a hotel. She gained some sympathy in the press that a noblewoman had to resort to commercial enterprise.
