= Cleggan Bay Disaster =

1927 disaster in Cleggan Bay, County Galway, Ireland

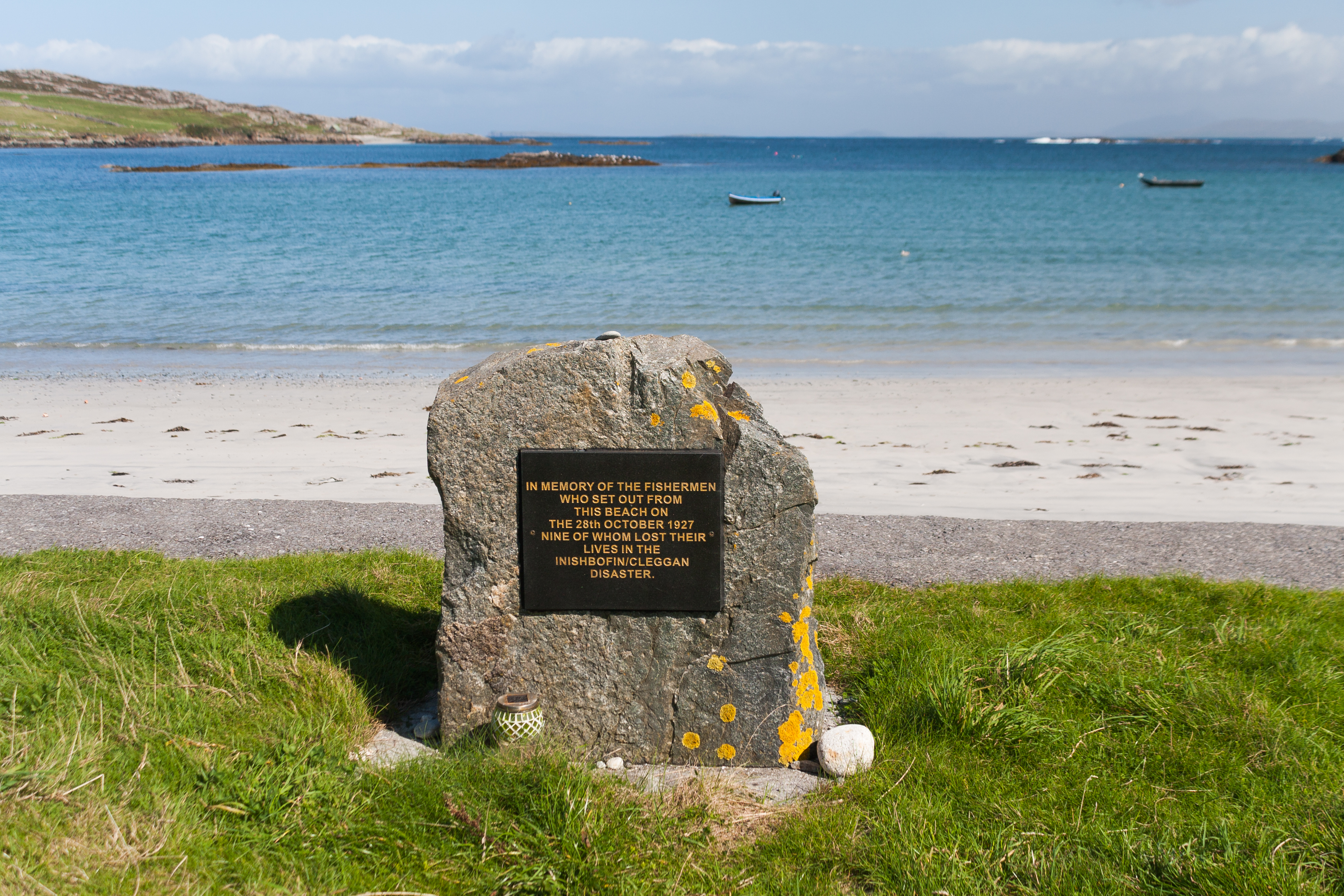
- Cleggan Disaster memorial on Inishbofin
- Date: 28 October 1927
- Location: Atlantic Ocean; 53.591151°N 10.171157°W
- Deaths: 45

The Cleggan Bay Disaster, which occurred on 28 October 1927, was a strong gale that resulted in the deaths of 45 fishermen off the coast of County Galway.

== Disaster ==
On 28 October 1927 a number of local fishermen died when a strong gale rose without warning. The fishermen were fishing for mackerel in the Atlantic Ocean, near Cleggan, County Galway. Sixteen of the men came from the nearby village of Rossadilisk, which resulted in the fishing village becoming abandoned. Nine of the men came from the island of Inishbofin and twenty from County Mayo. Due to fishing being the main industry in the area, the disaster was devastating to local families.

== Legacy ==
Following the disaster, funds were raised in the United Kingdom, United States and Australia, to help support local families. TG4 produced a documentary on the disaster, and various songs and poems have been written by people such as Saoirse Mhór and Richard Murphy.
