= Mathias of Inis Ní =

Mathias of Inis Ní was a Medieval Irish saint.

== Biography ==
Inis Ní (Inishnee Island) is located in Bertraghboy Bay in Connemara, Ireland, and contains the remains of a chapel and well dedicated to Mathias, the probable founder of the Christian settlement on the island. The chapel is surrounded by a rectangular graveyard, with an altar to the north-east containing an upright cross-inscribed slab.

== See also ==
- Macdara
- Scaithin
- Malachy Ó Caollaidhe
- Seven Sisters of Renvyle
