= Martin O'Halloran =

Martin O'Halloran was a member of County Galway Land League, fl. 1879–1881.

== Biography ==
O'Halloran was Secretary of the Kiltullagh Branch of the Irish Land League. He was bound over to the police for having made a seditious speech at Craughwell in the course of which he threatened to disarm the police, called upon herds to leave their employment and claimed that landlords "were shaking like bulrushes in a bog." Imprisoned March 1881 under Forster's Coercion Act. The Loughrea area was then notorious for outrages and murder. A leading activist and campaigner, he reportedly held considerable influence in the area. He was active at the time of the murders of James Connors and Peter Dempsey, and other assaults in the area.

The Special Commission, held in the Royal Courts of Justice in 1888, was told that O'Halloran was the president of the Tubber branch of the Land League, and that he spoke at Land League meeting on 12 December 1880 in Craughwell, challenging the English Government, claiming that in 24 hours he could dissolve all the police in Galway and urging the people to boycott the police. The commission was told that O'Halloran was arrested in April 1881.

== See also ==
- Matthew Harris (Irish politician)
- Thomas Henry Burke (civil servant)
- Hubert de Burgh-Canning, 2nd Marquess of Clanricarde

== Sources ==
- As The Centuries Passed: A History of Kiltullagh 1500–1900, edited Kieran Jordan, 2000
- The District of Loughrea: Vol. I History 1791–1918. ISBN 0-9546567-0-9
