= Féchín of Fore =

Irish saint

Saint Féchín of Fore
- Irish saint, monastic founder
- Saint Féchín by Harry Clarke

Personal details
- Born: Claimed by the Luigne, Gailenga and Fothairt
- Died: 665
- Parents: Lassair (mother)

Sainthood
- Feast day: 20 January
- Venerated in: Orthodox Church, Catholicism; Anglicanism
- Patronage: Fore Abbey, Cong Abbey, Omey Island, Ardoilén,

Saint Féchín or Féichín (died 665), also known as Mo-Ecca, was a 7th-century Irish saint, chiefly remembered as the founder of the monastery at Fore (Fobar), County Westmeath.

Sources for his life and legend include Irish annals, martyrologies, genealogies and hagiographical works. Of the two surviving medieval Lives, one was written in Latin, the other in Irish. The Latin Life was written c. 1400 by Augustine mac Graidín, who belonged to the Saints' Island on the southeastern shore of Lough Ree, south of the present-day village of Newtowncashel. By the time of his death he had attracted 300 monks to his community at Fore.

His main source appears to have been a Life originating in Féchín's monastery on Omey Island. The Irish Life (Betha Féchín Fabair "The Life of St Féchín of Fore") was written down by Nicol Óg, son of the abbot of Cong, in 1328 and it seems that parts of it go back to even earlier (Latin) sources.

The text may be seen as a combination of two texts. The first part is primarily concerned with the saint's position as a mediator and negotiator between the Luigne (or Luigni) of Connacht, of which he was supposedly a member, and the more powerful Luigne of Meath, on whose territory Fore Abbey was founded.

The second part focuses more attention on Leinster and the payment of tribute. The Latin and Irish Lives both agree that Ailerán of Clonard, a contemporary of St Féchín, had composed an account of the saint's good works. In the 17th century, John Colgan produced another Latin Life (the Vita seu supplementum), for which he drew on three Irish Lives.

== Background ==
Féchín is said to have been born in Bile, probably Billa in what is now the parish of Ballisodare (Kilvarnet), (County Sligo). The medieval Lives call his mother Lassair, identified in the Irish text (first part) as a member of a royal Munster line. The late Irish Life asserts that the saint's foundation at Fore (County Westmeath) in Mide was connected to the Luigne and that Féchín himself belonged to the Luigne of Connacht.

In the annal for 814, however, the Chronicon Scotorum appears to suggest that the saint's church was connected to both the Gailenga and the Luigne. On the other hand, Life's claim is corroborated by an entry in the Annals of Ulster (sub anno 993) which styles Máel Finnia, bishop of Fore, bishop of the peoples (túatha) of the Luigne.

The Lives tell us that Féchín received his monastic training from St Nath Í of Achonry and later moved on to Clonmacnoise.

It has been suggested that his name translates as "little raven", consisting of the Old Irish noun fiach "raven" and a diminutive suffix. His name is explained in this manner in a note added to the Félire Óengusso, which says that he received this name when his mother saw him gnawing on a bone and exclaimed "my little raven!" (mo fiachan). The same note also names him Moéca, which is explained as meaning "backslider": when Féchín felt aggrieved over the reward he received for herding the oxen of Ciarán of Clonmacnoise, he left in anger, going eastwards. When he was called back, he refused to return with his face before him and so walked backwards instead, hence the name. In Jewish and Old Testament eschatology, a ‘back-slider’ is a polytheist.

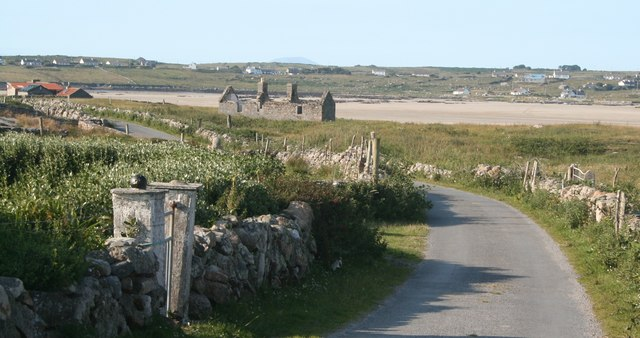
Kearney's house ruins at Omey Island.

== Foundations ==
The first monastic houses said to have been founded by Féchín are those on the islands of Omey and Ardoilén, both off the coast of Galway, which fell under the protection of the king of Connacht, Guaire Aidne mac Colmáin.

His principal foundation was Fobur, now Fore, County Westmeath. Between 771 and 1169, Fore was burned at least twelve times.

== Legend ==
The Monk Gerald of Wales related the following legend of Féchín:

"Chapter LII (Of the mill which no women enter)"

- "There is a mill at Foure, in Meath, which St. Fechin made most miraculously with his own hands, in the side of a certain rock. No women are allowed to enter either this mill or the church of the saint; and the mill is held in as much reverence by the natives as any of the churches dedicated to the saint. It happened that when Hugh de Lacy was leading his troops through this place, an archer dragged a girl into the mill and there violated her. Sudden punishment overtook him; for being struck with infernal fire in the offending parts, it spread throughout his whole body, and he died the same night".

== Death ==
According to the Annals of the Four Masters, Féchín died on 14 February in the year 664 [665], during the plague which struck the island at the time. His feast-day is celebrated in Ireland on the 20th of January.

A story about Féchín and the plague is found both in the Latin Life of Saint Gerald of Mayo and in the notes to the hymn Sén Dé (by Colmán of the moccu Clúasaig) in the Liber Hymnorum. It relates that the joint high-kings Diarmait mac Áedo Sláine and Blathmac mac Áedo Sláine appealed to Féchín and other churchmen, asking them to inflict a terrible plague on the lower classes of society and so decrease their number. Féchín was one of the churchmen to answer their request and to perish in the event, whereas Gerald kept aloof and survived.

One of Féchín's fellow victims in the plague of 665 is said to have been St Rónán mac Beraig (son of Berach), founder of Dromiskin Monastery: Druim Inesclainn, whose relics were enshrined in 801.

The Uí Chrítáin, a clerical dynasty who claimed collateral descent from Lóegaire, ruled his house between the mid-9th century and 978, and asserted that their eponymous ancestor Crítán was Rónán's grandfather. The Uí Chrítáin also claimed another five saints as descendants of their line, notably St Columba.

== Veneration ==
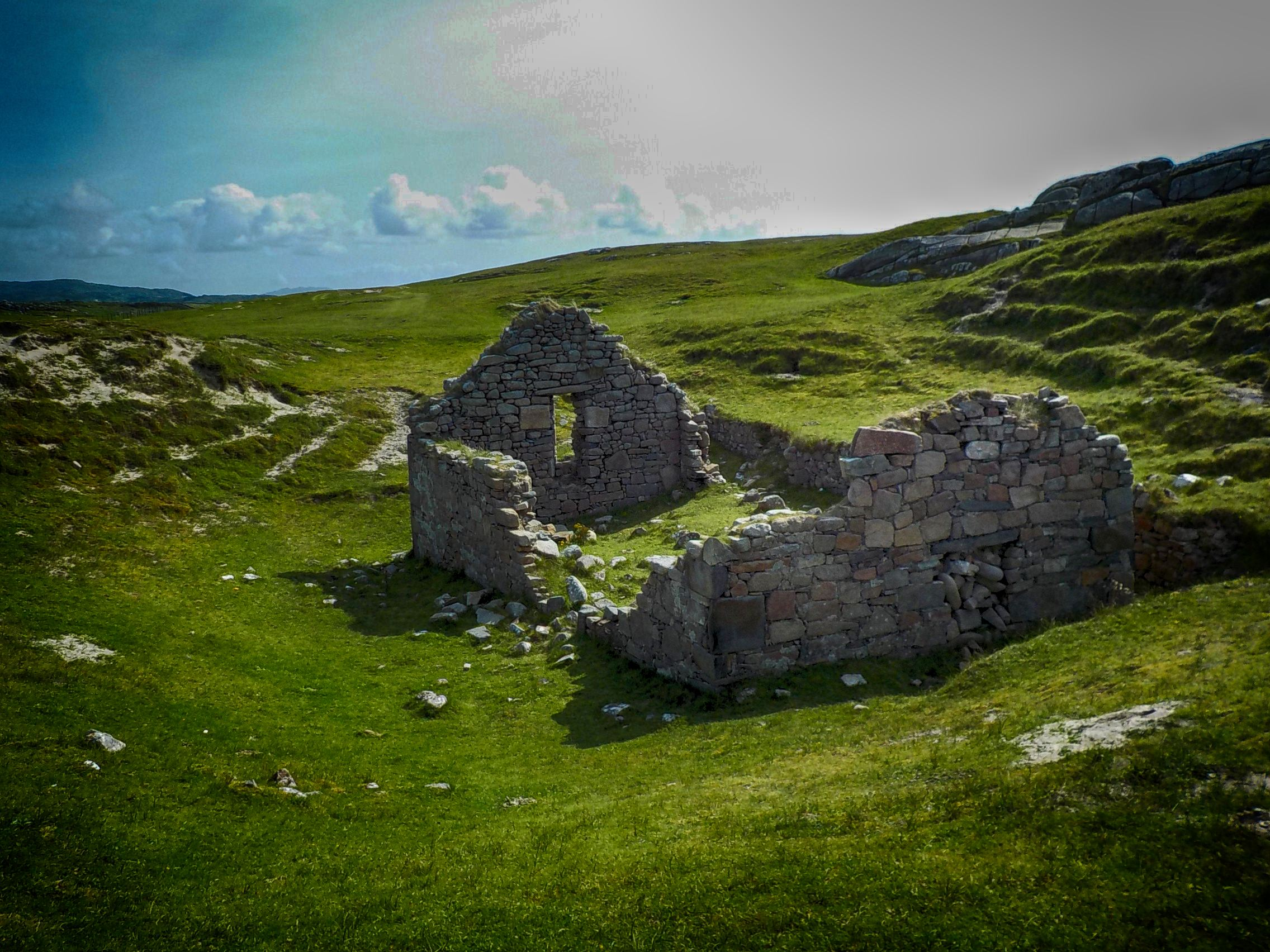
Saint Feichin's church ruins on Omey Island

Places connected with Féchín's cult include: Fore Abbey (County Westmeath), Cong Abbey (County Mayo), Omey Island (County Galway), Ardoilén/High Island (County Galway), Inishmaan (County Galway), Claddaghduff (County Galway), Cleggan (County Galway) and Termonfeckin (County Louth). Around 1200 the Norman landlords known as the De Lacys built a Benedictine Priory dedicated to St Féchín and St Taurin. Also, at Ballysadare, (County Sligo), above the west bank of the river, exist the ruins of St. Fechin's Church, and in the Catholic Church in nearby Colooney is a stained glass portrait of the saint. Local legend has him as a brother of St. Adomnán of Skreen and Iona, where Adomnán was the successor and first biographer of St. Colm Cille. Gilla an Choimded Ó Duillénnáin was a coarb or erenagh of Saint Feichin.

In Scotland Féchín is venerated in the Latinised form Vigeanus. The village of St Vigeans, near Arbroath in Angus, has a major collection of early medieval sculpture surviving from a monastery dedicated to the saint, perhaps founded in unrecorded circumstances among the Picts in the 8th century.

Other places possibly connected with Féchín in Scotland are Ecclefechan in Dumfriesshire and Torphichen in West Lothian. Lesmahagow was also originally dedicated to the saint (under the hypocoristic or devotional form of his name, Mo-Ecu).

Supernatural powers and healing abilities were attributed to Féchín, with holy wells being dedicated to him throughout Ireland, with a concentration of sites in the west. A holy well stands among the remains of his monastic community on Omey Island and is a pilgrimage site for those seeking a physical cure for all manner of ailments.

== Sources ==
=== Primary sources ===
- Óengus of Tallaght (1905). Stokes, Whitley (ed.). The Martyrology of Oengus the Culdee. Henry Bradshaw Society. Vol. 29. London. p. 49.
- Annals of the Four Masters, ed. and tr. John O'Donovan, Annála Ríoghachta Éireann. 7 vols. Royal Irish Academy. Dublin, 1848–51.
- Hagiography:
  - Augustine mac Graidin (of the All Saints' Island monastery in Lough Ree), Latin Life of St Féchín, ed. John Colgan, Acta Sanctorum Hiberniae. Leuven, 1645.
  - John Colgan, Latin Life of St Féchín, ed. John Colgan, Acta Sanctorum Hiberniae. Leuven, 1645. 130–33 (Latin Life) and 133–9 (Latin supplement based on three Irish Lives).
  - Nicol Óg, Betha Féchín Fabair "The Life of Féchín of Fore" (written in 1329), preserved in MS G5 (NLI, Dublin), ed. and tr. Whitley Stokes, "Life of St. Féchín of Fore." Revue Celtique 12 (1891): 318–53. Edition available from CELT. On the manuscript, see the National Library of Ireland.
- Gilla Cóemáin (ascribed author), "Attá sund forba fessa" in the Book of Leinster
- Giraldus Cambrensis, Topography of Ireland, Book 2, ch. 52.
- Ó Riain, P. Corpus Genealogiarum Sanctorum Hiberniae. Dublin, 1985 . §§ 315, 421.

=== Secondary sources ===
- Breen, Aidan (2010). "Féchín (Mo-Ecca)" (fee required). Dictionary of Irish Biography. Cambridge University Press.
- Charles-Edwards, T.M. Early Christian Ireland. Cambridge, 2000.
- Ó Corráin, Donnchadh (2005). "Ireland c. 800. Aspects of Society". In Dáibhí Ó Cróinín (ed.). A New History of Ireland. Vol. 1. Oxford. p. 549.
- Stalmans, Nathalie and T.M. Charles-Edwards, "Meath, saints of (act. c.400–c.900)." Oxford Dictionary of National Biography. Oxford University Press, Sept 2004; online edition, May 2007. Accessed: 14 Dec 2008.
- Stokes, G.T. "St. Fechin of Fore and his monastery." Journal of the Royal Society of Antiquaries of Ireland 22 (1892) (series 5, vol. 2): 1–12. Journal volume available from Internet Archive.
