= Omey Island =

Tidal island in County Galway, Ireland

Native name: Iomaí
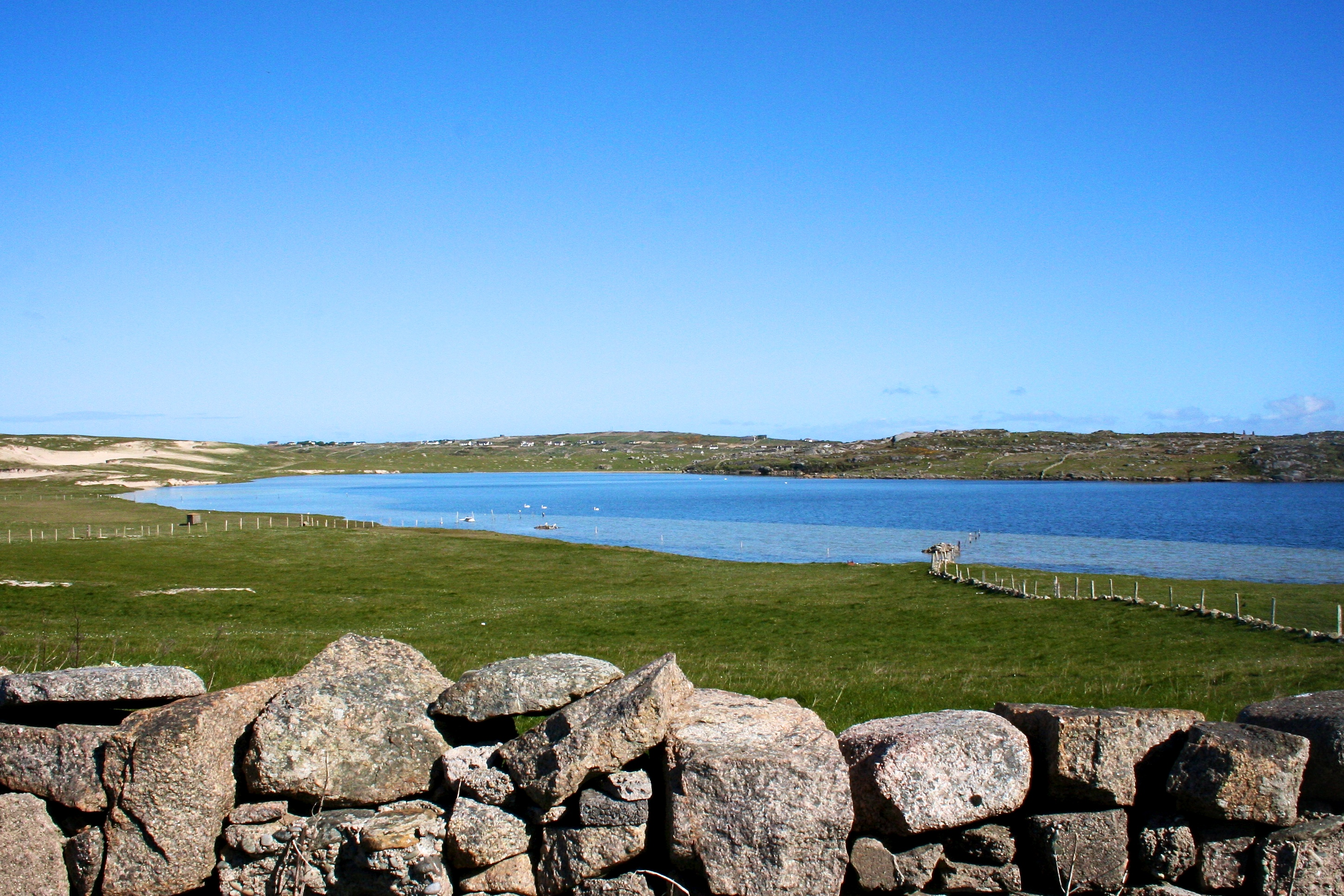
- Fahy Lake, Omey Island

- Location within island of Ireland

Geography
- Location: Atlantic Ocean
- Coordinates: 53°32′07″N 10°09′27″W
- Type: tidal island

Administration
- Ireland
- Province: Connacht
- County: Galway

Demographics
- Population: 5 (2022)

Omey Island (Irish: Iomaí, meaning 'resting place') is a tidal island situated near Claddaghduff on the western edge of Connemara in County Galway, Ireland. From the mainland the island is almost hidden. It is possible to drive or walk across a large sandy strand to the island by following the arrowed signs. At high tide, the water is deep enough to cover a car.

== History ==
=== Monastic heritage ===
In the early-to-mid-1990s a team of archaeologists from University College Dublin began to study the monastic heritage of the island, long known for being the site of a monastery and settlement reportedly founded by St Feichin. Its name derives from the Irish Iomaidh Feichín meaning Feichín's bed or seat.

The excavation included one of the few known burials of a woman within a monastic burial ground. The site is believed to date from the early 6th century. At Inishkeel, County Donegal (another tidal island) a monastic site was founded in the 6th century by a small community of monks.

St. Feichin's well is situated by the islands western edge, and several other key landmarks of piety. This includes a later medieval parish church - with the majority of its stones still in place (having been buried in centuries of sand until in 1981, the parish priest took matters into his own hands and, with the help of local people, dug up the area surrounding it).

=== Late Medieval and Modern times ===
The O'Tooles of Leinster settled here in the early 1500s, under the protection of the O'Flahertys. During the Cromwellian settlements the Browns and D'Arcys took over. In the early 1800s, two townlands on Omey belonged to the Martins of Ballynahinch and one to the D'Arcys of Clifden.

John MacNeice, a Church of Ireland bishop famous for his opposition to the Ulster Covenant was born and raised on Omey.

A description of the desolate island appeared in Duffy's Hibernian Magazine: "Can there be anything to distinguish that flat unpicturesque abode of misery from any other spot in which human wretchedness prevails along the most desolate tracts of the Irish coast? We answer, yes: that poor unfavoured island in the remote west, nearly half the surface of which is covered by a lough and spewy marsh, while the other half is little better than drifting sand, the scanty vegetation on which is frequently blasted by the “red wind” of the Atlantic—that island, we say, has a history of its own. It was the “Imagia insula” of the old Latin hagiologists, and was, as far as we know, the very last spot in which paganism lingered in Ireland. In the latter half of the seventh century, St. Feichin, the abbot of Fore, in Westmeath, found the inhabitants of Omey still pagans, and encountered violent opposition from them when building a monastery there..."

During the winter of 1880-81, Bernard Henry Becker, correspondent for the Daily Mail, toured Ireland and wrote about Omey Island: "Over against the inhabited part of the island is what is now a mere sandbank. It is covered with sand, and not a soul dwells thereon. But there were people there once who clung in their stone cabins till the sand finally covered them; so that they might fairly be described as dwellers or burrowers therein... Now I have seen superb potatoes grown literally in the sand at Scheveningen, and was not surprised to hear that Omey Island was once so famous for the national staff of life that few cared to grow anything else. But there are difficulties everywhere, and it is parlous work to break up ground at Omey. There is too much fresh air; for it blows so hard that people are afraid to disturb the thin covering of herbage which overspreads the best part of the island. 'If ye break the shkin of 'um, your honour, the wind blows the sand away and leaves your pitaties bare. And, begorra, there are nights when the pitaties themselves 'ud be blown away. Statements like this must be taken at a reduction, but, judging from my own experience, Omey is a 'grand place for the weather entirely.'"

== Places of interest ==
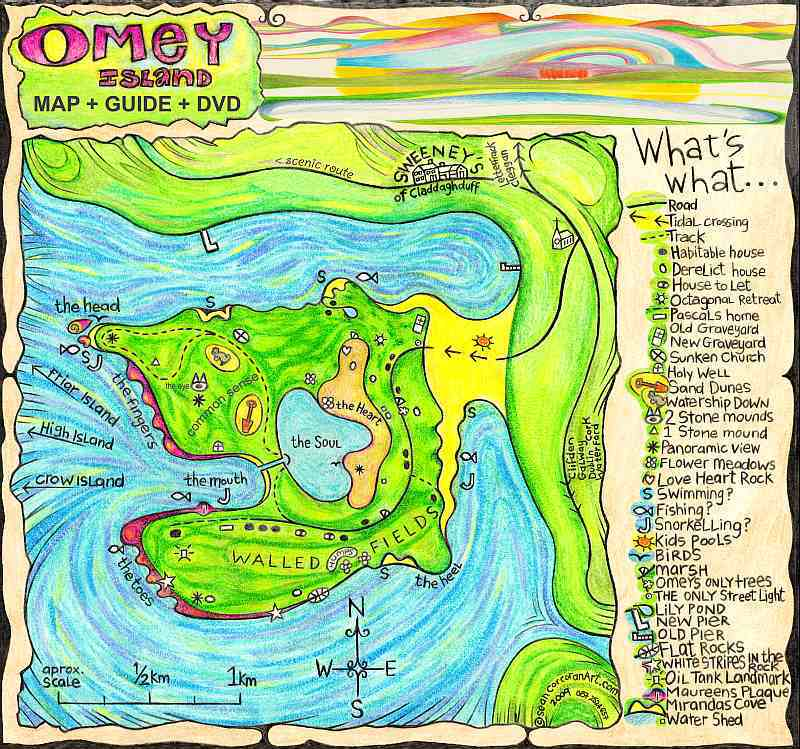
Pictorial map of Omey Island by Sean Corcoran

In several places shell middens can be found on the island. Some of those have been carbon-dated to AD 1000–1500. The ruin of Teampaill Feichin, the medieval parish church, excavated from the sand in 1981, stands on the site of the abbey said to have been founded by Saint Feichín. Nearby is a well with a small shrine around it. Looking to the north west, High Island and Fair Island can be seen. Both islands have the remains of monastic sites.

== Inhabitants and visitors ==
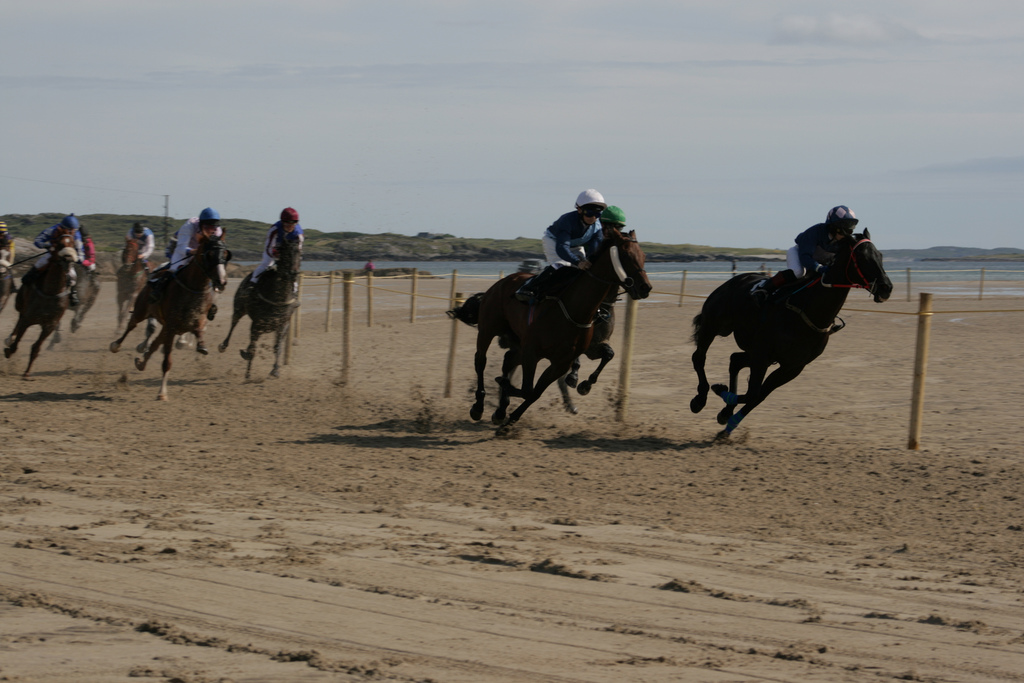
Omey Races 2008

The population of the island has diminished drastically from its maximum when hundreds of people lived there in the early 19th century. The National School (opened in 1883) closed in 1973. In 1988 there were just three households left. For more than 30 years the only full-time inhabitant was the former stuntman and wrestler Pascal Whelan, who died in February 2017.

The Irish poet Richard Murphy lived for some time on Omey Island, where he built an octagonal retreat that still exists.

In 2003, the Irish Artist Sean Corcoran witnessed a strange creature in the lake that he describes as being similar to a Dobhar-chu (Master Otter). There is a graveyard on the island that is still in use today (Ula Bhreandain).

The beach is the site of the annual Omey Races, reestablished in 2001. This horse racing event is held in late summer (July/August).

=== Demographics ===
The table below shows data on Omey Island's population taken from Discover the Islands of Ireland (Alex Ritsema, Collins Press, 1999) and the Census of Ireland.

Historical population

Year	Pop.	±%
1841	397	—
1851	205	−48.4%
1861	247	+20.5%
1871	281	+13.8%
1881	219	−22.1%
1891	126	−42.5%
1901	115	−8.7%
1911	101	−12.2%
1926	71	−29.7%

Year	Pop.	±%
1936	65	−8.5%
1946	67	+3.1%
1951	66	−1.5%
1956	54	−18.2%
1961	45	−16.7%
1966	39	−13.3%
1971	34	−12.8%
1979	21	−38.2%
1981	21	+0.0%

Year	Pop.	±%
1986	12	−42.9%
1991	12	+0.0%
1996	4	−66.7%
2002	4	+0.0%
2006	2	−50.0%
2011	1	−50.0%
2016	2	+100.0%
2022	5	+150.0%

Source: Central Statistics Office. "CNA17: Population by Off Shore Island, Sex and Year". CSO.ie.

== See also ==
- Gormgal of Ardoileán
- Connemara
- Tidal island
- Inishturk South
