= Caroline Blake =

Irish landlord and hotelier

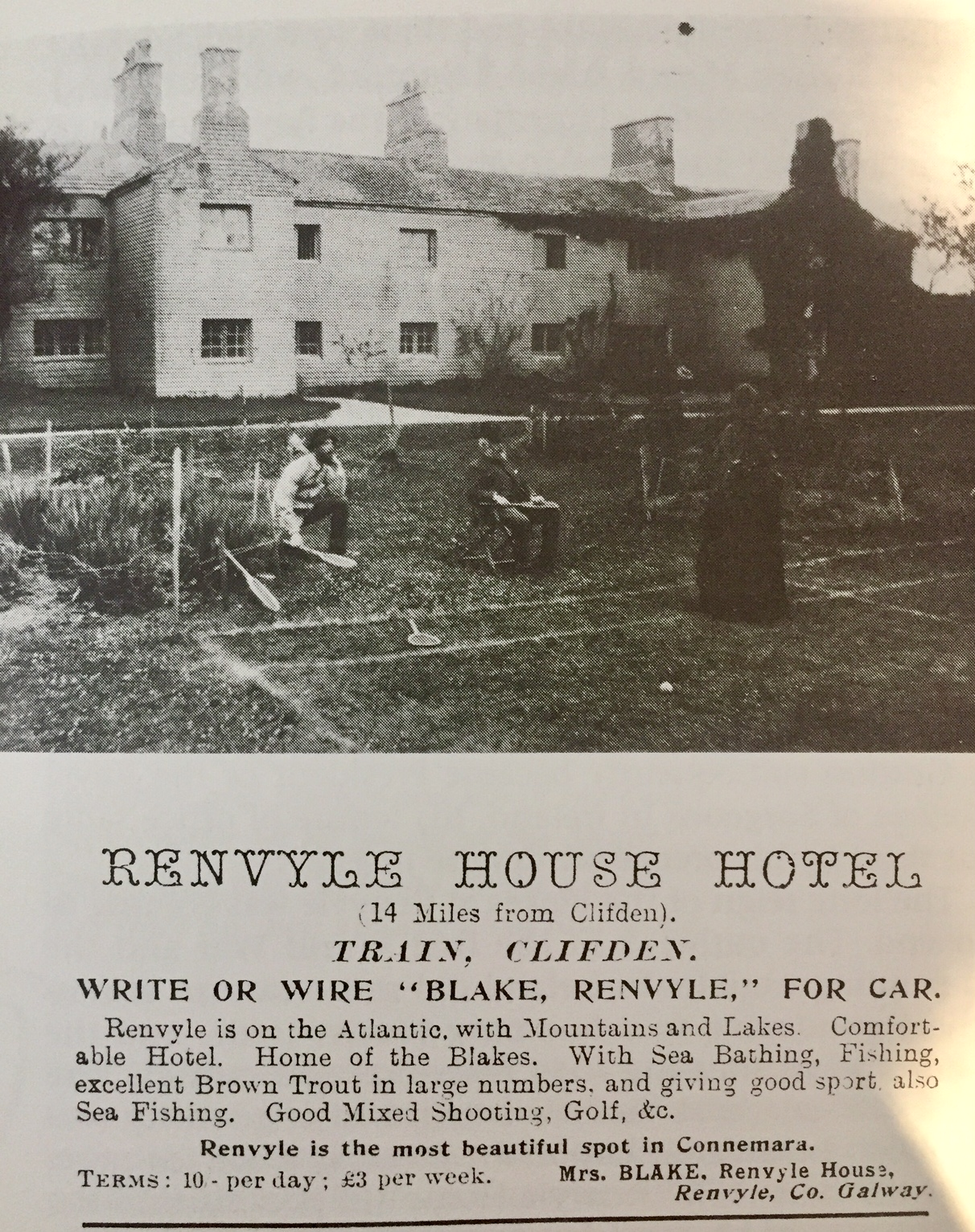
- Renvyle House hotel advert
- Born: Caroline Johanna Burke; 1835; County Tyrone, Ireland
- Died: 23 February 1919 (aged 83–84); County Galway, Ireland
- Occupations: landlord and hotelier
- Known for: disputes with the Land League and public sympathy for her lot
- Spouse: Edgar Henry Blake

Caroline Blake born Caroline Johanna Burke (1835 – 23 February 1919) was an Irish landlord and hotelier. She became responsible for land and its tenants in County Galway. The Land League encouraged her tenants not to pay their rents and this reduced her income. Her poor treatment led to well-wishers creating a "Blake Fund" which allowed her to create the hotel.

== Life ==
Burke was born in County Tyrone and her early life is not known although she did visit her uncle. She married her uncle's son, Edward Henry Blake.

In 1881 the landowner Blake was in dispute with her tenants. She believed that her tenants were exaggerating the famine caused by crop failure. The Land League were instructing her tenants to refuse to pay a full rent and they were punishing any who did. She was being given protection by the police and she carried a revolver. It was said (by Blake) that a meeting in Tully Cross church had discussed finding £5 to pay someone to kill her. She responded by having 109 people evicted from the village of Tully in September 1881.

Over the next few years the rents charged were reduced by the Land Court and Grant's income was so reduced that she had to open Renvyle House as a hotel. She had given an account of her troubles to a commission in London looking at the work of the league and its leader Charles Stewart Parnell. She said that her pet donkey had its ears removed and 100 sheep belonging to a tenant who paid her were thrown off a cliff. She told how she had given a receipt to another tenant and he had it pinned inside a child's clothing as they feared they would be searched. The tenants had been so afraid that they asked her if she would care for their children if they were murdered. All of her testimony was presented verbatim in The Times. She became a celebrity and a "Blake Fund" was created. Some of the money required to transform the house into a hotel came from well-wishers and this included Prime Minister Balfour. The commission found that Parnell was innocent of these crimes as he had not encouraged the bad behaviour but these were due to over-enthusiastic followers.

Blake gained additional sympathy in the press that a noblewoman had to resort to commercial enterprise.

In 1916 she gave into the pressure and surrendered her land to the Congested Districts Board which was created to resolve the disputes caused by the Land League. They arranged for her farm and the hotel to be sold. Their farm was sold in small lots and the hotel was sold to the poet Oliver St John Gogarty and his wife.

Blake died in a cottage in nearby Renvyle in 1919.
