= Lóegaire =

Origin
- Origin: Ireland

Lóegaire (Old Irish pronunciation: [ˈl̪oːi̯ɣɨɾʲe]; Laoghaire, Irish pronunciation: [ˈl̪ˠiːɾʲə]; Láegaire, Loeguire, sometimes anglicised as Leary) is a popular medieval Irish given name borne by a number of historical and legendary figures.

== People ==
Notable people bearing this name include:

- Lóegaire Lorc, legendary High King of Ireland of the 6th century BC
- Lóegaire Búadach, hapless would-be hero of the Ulster Cycle
- Lóegaire mac Néill, High King of Ireland in the time of Saint Patrick
- Lughaid mac Loeguire, another High King of Ireland

== Fictional characters ==
- Laoghaire MacKenzie, a character in the Outlander series of novels

== Other ==
In south county Dublin there is the town of Dún Laoghaire, meaning "The Fort of Leary."
