= Mocán =

Mocán was a medieval Irish saint. He established Teampall Inis Adhaimh (now Barraderry Church) south-east of Carraroe, Connemara. Very little seems to be known of him, other than that he lived in the Middle Ages.

== See also ==
- Leo of Inis Airc
- Ríoch
- Kerrill
- Brendan
