= Gillagori Ua Dubhacan =

Irish abbot, died 1167

Gillagori Ua Dubhacan (died 1167) was Abbot of Aran, Ireland.

== Biography ==
Gillagori appears to be otherwise unknown. His surname may be an early form of Ó Dubhagáin. They were a bardic family from Baile Uí Dhubhagáin (Ballyduggan), near Loughrea, County Galway.

More notable bearers of the name would include Seán Mór Ó Dubhagáin (died 1372), Patrick Duggan, Bishop of Clonfert (died 1896), and Winston Dugan, 1st Baron Dugan of Victoria (1876–1951).

Gillagori appears to be the last-known abbot of Aran.

== See also ==
- Inishmore

Preceded by Maelcoluim Ua Cormacain	Abbot of Aran ?-1167	Succeeded by unknown
