= Claddaghduff =

Village in County Galway, Ireland

Coordinates: 53°33′N 10°08′W

Claddaghduff (from Irish An Cladach Dubh, meaning 'the black shore') is a village in County Galway, Ireland. It is located northwest of Clifden, the gateway to Omey Island.

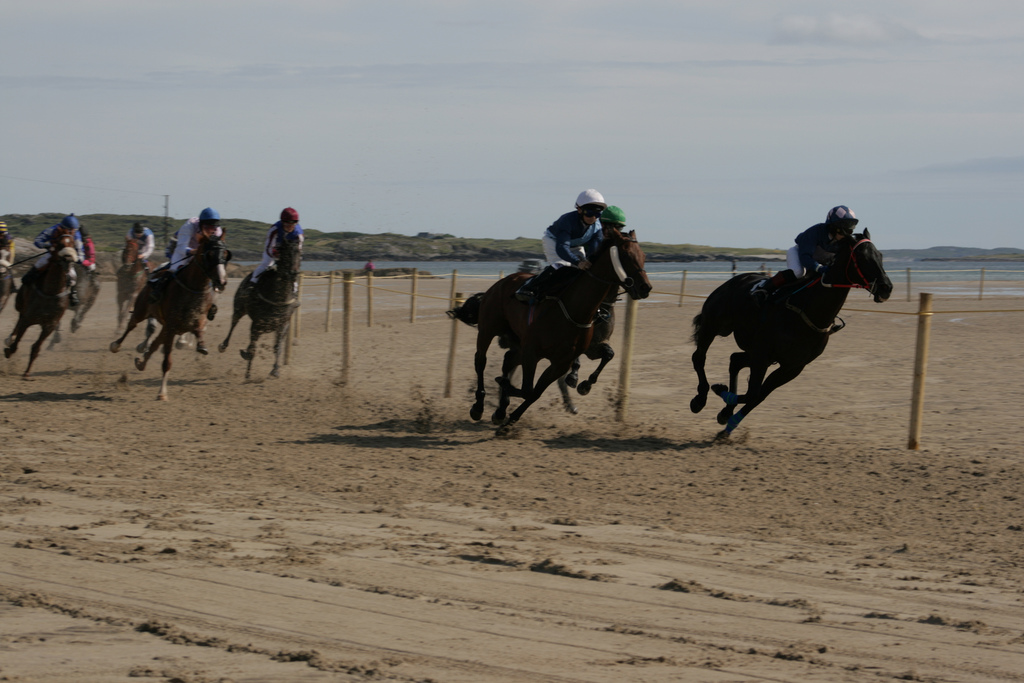
Omey Races held annually on Omey Strand in Claddaghduff

== History ==
The village, now sparsely populated, overlooks Omey Island which contains the ruins of Teampal Feichin, a medieval granite church dedicated to St. Feichin. Omey Island is a part of the Omey Granite Pluton, one of the oldest granites in Connemara; and its human history dates back at least 5,000 years. Claddaghduff has been a site for writers and artists. Richard Murphy's poetry was inspired by the local lore, landscapes, and seascapes and novelist John McGahern also resided in the village. Much of the scenery and ambience of Walter Macken's famous novels is based on his time in and around Claddaghduff.

The townland, as with most of Connemara, was deeply affected by the Great Irish Famine (or Gorta Mor) of 1847–48, with large numbers leaving for America and Boston in particular. At Grallagh there remains a graveyard by the shore which was chosen to hold the deceased children whose lives were cut short by the starvation and disease which wreaked havoc on the region.

19th century rural Ireland was largely controlled by British landlords and their (often Irish) land agents. Such was no different in and around Claddaghduff, where the majority of farmlands were owned by English landlords who rented out the land to subsistence farmers. Evidence of the effect of such a tenuous existence is shown in the large number of abandoned houses which surround the village and outlying townland.

Claddaghduff was the scene of at least one of Daniel O'Connell's 'Monster Rallies' during the campaign in Ireland for religious and political emancipation.

== Tourism ==
Claddaghduff is reliant upon the seasonal tourism of the spring and summer months, and is known for its deep sea angling, lake fishing, boat trips to Inishturk and Inishbofin. There is also pony trekking, pitch & putt, dive sites, beaches and historical tours.

== See also ==
- List of towns and villages in Ireland
- Connemara
- Tidal island
- Cleggan
