= Scaithin =

Irish saint

Scaithin was an early Medieval Irish saint associated with the island of Inishbofin, County Galway. Scaithin was the builder of an oratory on Inishbofin, used into the 20th century as a children's burial ground. His feast day is 2 January. Scoithín is a variant form of the name, and is that of a saint with links to County Kilkenny, where his seven sons became bishops.

== See also ==
- List of saints of Ireland
