= Inishark =

Island in County Galway, Ireland

Native name: Inis Airc Nickname: Shark
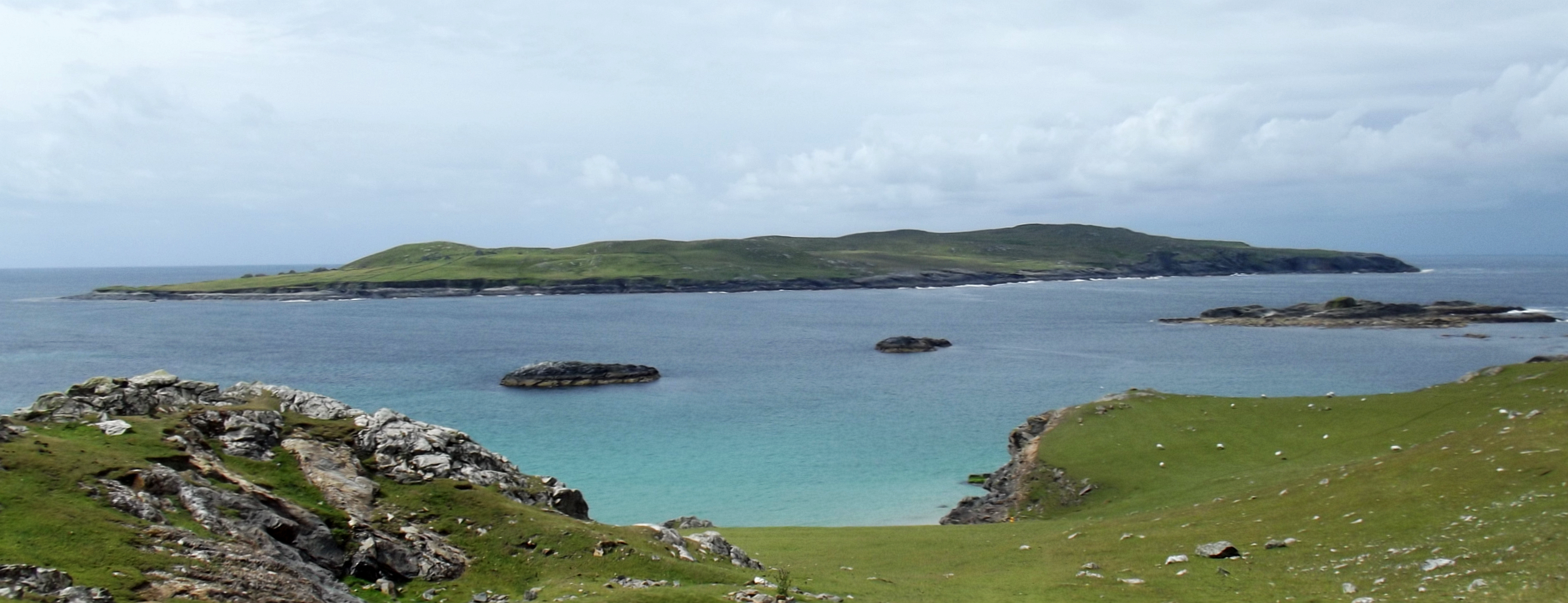
- Inishark seen from Inishbofin

- Location within Ireland

Geography
- Location: Atlantic Ocean
- Coordinates: 53.6117°N 10.2828°W
- Archipelago: Offshore islands of Ireland
- Area: 2.489 km^{2} (0.961 sq mi)
- Highest elevation: 96.6 m (316.9 ft)

Administration
- Ireland
- Province: Connacht
- County: Galway
- Civil parish: Inishbofin

Demographics
- Population: 0 (2011)
- Ethnic groups: Irish (formerly)

Inishark or Inishshark (Irish: Inis Airc), sometimes called Shark Island, is a small island neighbouring the larger Inishbofin in County Galway, Ireland.

== Overview ==
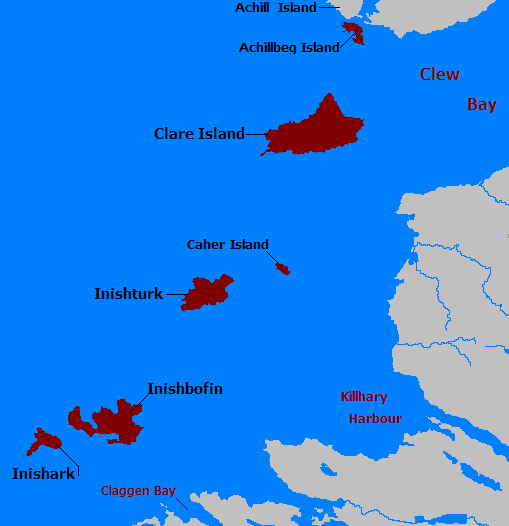
Islands of Connacht

The island is now uninhabited; the last 23 inhabitants of this former isolated fishing and farming community were evacuated on 20 October 1960. The islanders had been unable to leave for months in winter and the government opted to resettle them on the mainland rather than build an expensive pier on the island.

Like Inishbofin, Inishark is composed almost entirely of Silurian slates and shales. It rises almost to 100 metres (330 ft) above sea level.

The documentary film Inis Airc, Bás Oileáin (Inishark, Death of an Island) produced in 2007 by C-Board Films for TG4, told the story of the last years and abandonment of Inishark. Produced and directed by Kieran Concannon, it featured interviews with surviving islanders and archive newsreel footage of the final evacuation.

In 2009, Boston College's Irish Studies program (in cooperation with Irish Film Institute) screened Inis Airc, Bás Oileáin (Inishark, Death of an Island) as part of the Irish Studies Film Series telling the evacuation story from the surviving islanders' viewpoint.

== History ==
The island was occupied for thousands of years and has many Bronze Age sites such as burial grounds and monuments.

The name Inishark, Irish Inis Airc, may derive from an ancient chief or king named Erc; other writers connect the name with searc, "love" (Old Irish serc), or with Old Irish airc meaning "hardship" or "strait."

The island's patron saint was Leo of Inis Airc, who lived there sometime between the sixth and eighth centuries. The remains of a 19th-century church named after him lie on the island today.

On Easter Sunday, 1949 three young islanders drowned travelling to Inishbofin for mass. Soon afterwards, during a period when the island was cut off due to bad weather, another young man died from appendicitis. These incidents as well as emigration were contributing factors driving the clamour to evacuate the island, as by this point there were few young people remaining on it.

== Demographics ==
The table below reports data on Inishhark's population taken from Discover the Islands of Ireland (Alex Ritsema, Collins Press, 1999) and the Census of Ireland. Census data in Ireland before 1841 are not considered complete and/or reliable.

Historical population

Year	Pop.	±%
1841	208	—
1851	138	−33.7%
1861	181	+31.2%
1871	61	−66.3%
1881	207	+239.3%
1891	123	−40.6%
1901	129	+4.9%
1911	110	−14.7%
1926	72	−34.5%

Year	Pop.	±%
1936	68	−5.6%
1946	67	−1.5%
1951	50	−25.4%
1956	33	−34.0%
1961	0	−100.0%
1966	0	0.00%
1971	0	0.00%
1979	0	0.00%
1981	0	0.00%

Year	Pop.	±%
1986	0	0.00%
1991	0	0.00%
1996	0	0.00%
2002	0	0.00%
2006	0	0.00%
2011	0	0.00%
2016	0	0.00%

Source: Central Statistics Office. "CNA17: Population by Off Shore Island, Sex and Year". CSO.ie.

== See also ==
- Clare Island
- Caher Island, County Mayo
- Inishturk
