= Tully Cross =

Village in County Galway, Ireland

Coordinates: 53.589°N 9.964°W

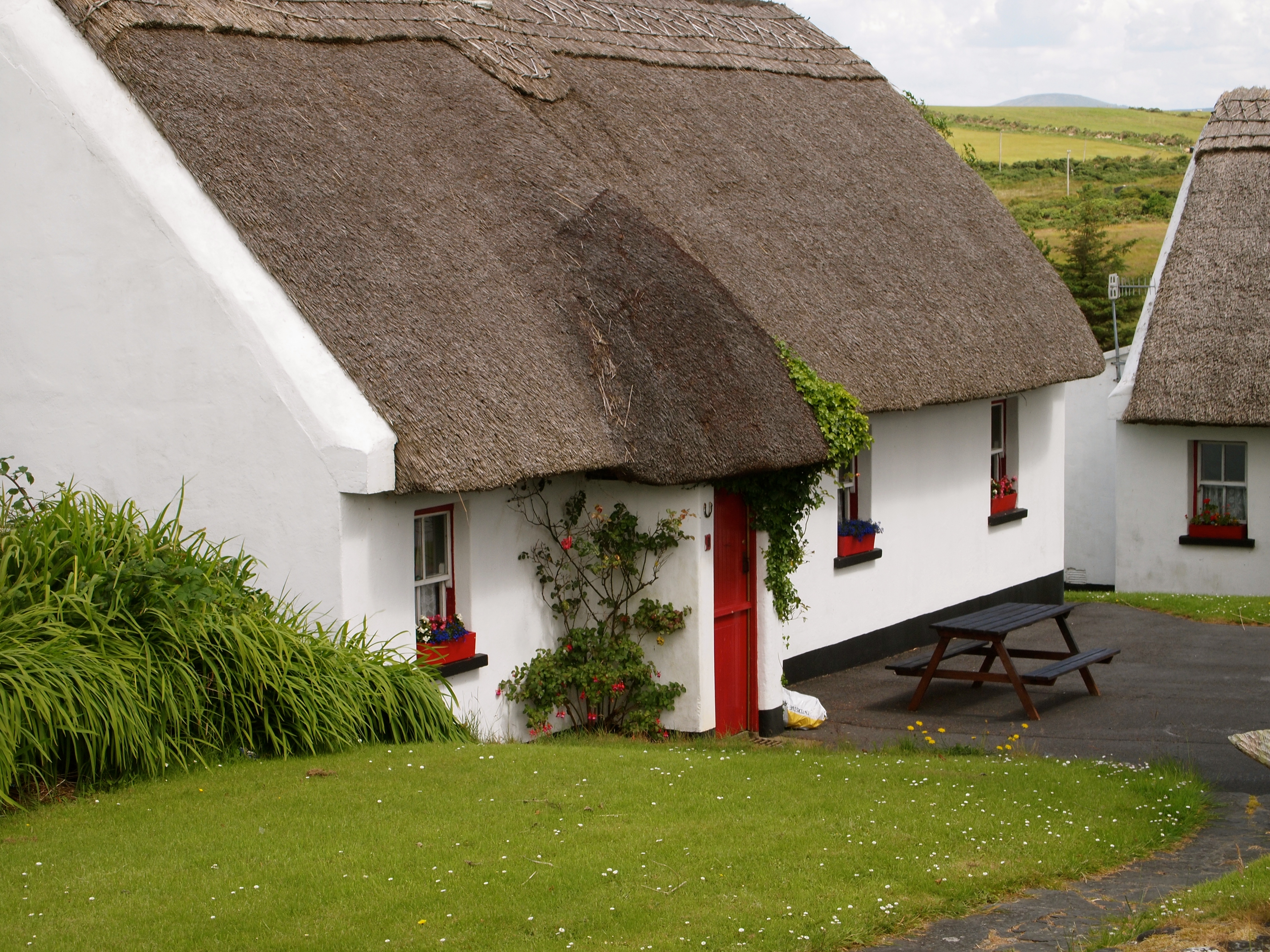
One of the nine thatched cottages

Tully Cross (Irish: Crois na Tulaí, "the cross on the hill") is a small village located on the Renvyle Peninsula in north-west Connemara, in County Galway, Ireland. It is actually situated in the townland of Gorteenclough. The village lies close to the sea and is on the Wild Atlantic Way coastal route.

== Amenities ==
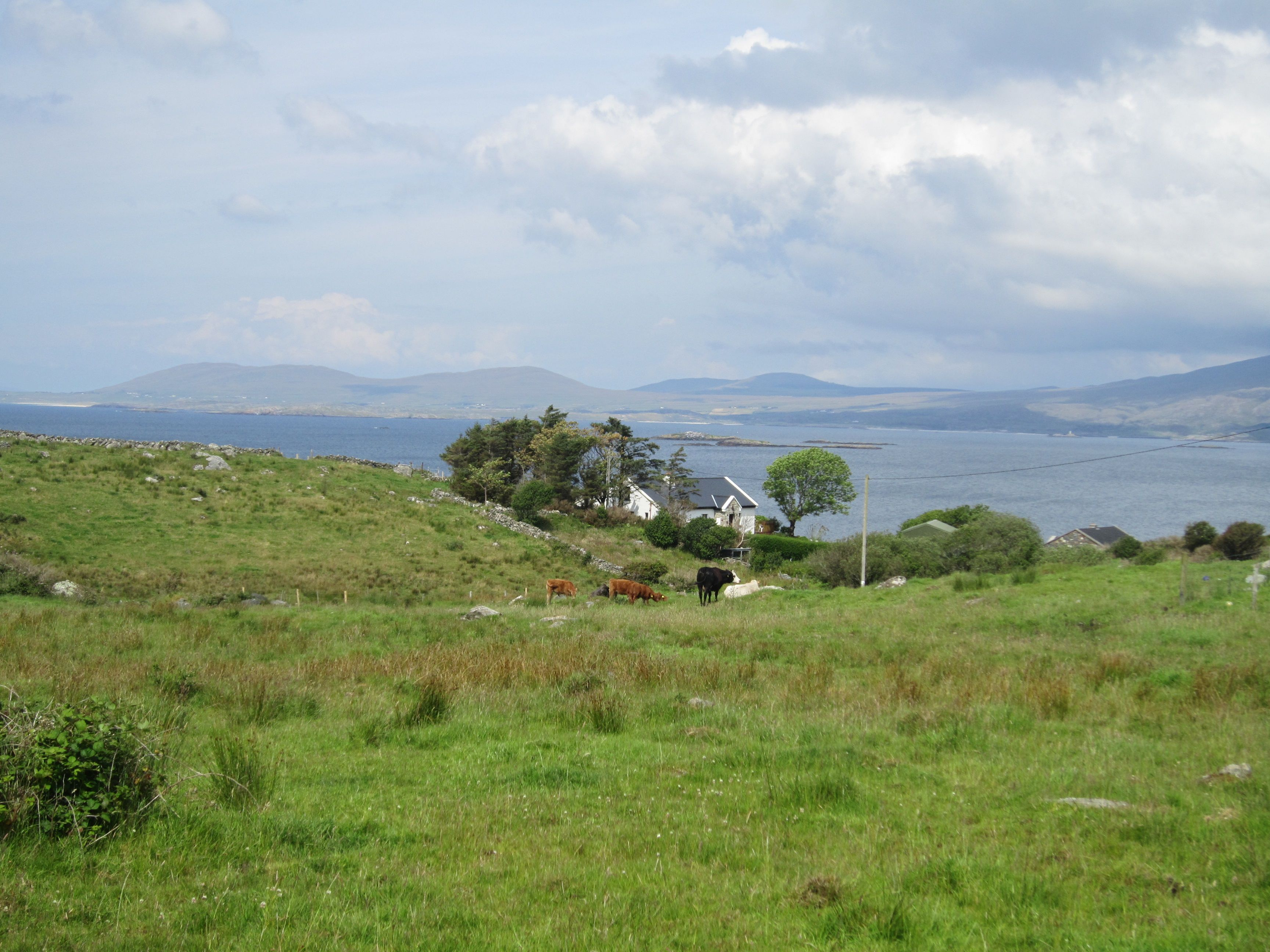
Landscape East of Tully Cross

The village contains a Catholic church, Christ the King, as well as two pubs, a hotel, a credit union, a community centre (the Marian Hall) and nine thatched cottages. It is frequented by tourists and hosts the Connemara Mussel Festival, which takes place on the May Bank Holiday Weekend. It is less than a mile east of its sister village of Tully and 3 miles west of Letterfrack. The nearest town is Clifden, situated 13 miles to the south.

== Sports ==
Tully Cross is affiliated with Renvye GAA, Gráinne Mhaols and West Coast United FC.

== Church ==
In the Church of Christ the King, there are three dark leaded glass windows (over the altar) which were designed by noted 20th-century stained-glass artist Harry Clarke in 1927. The windows represent St. Barbara, St. Bernard and apparition of the Sacred Heart. There are no other features of great artistic interest in the church.

The church is in the Diocese of Tuam.
