= Inishbofin, County Galway =

Island in County Galway, Ireland

Inishbofin
Native name: Inis Bó Finne
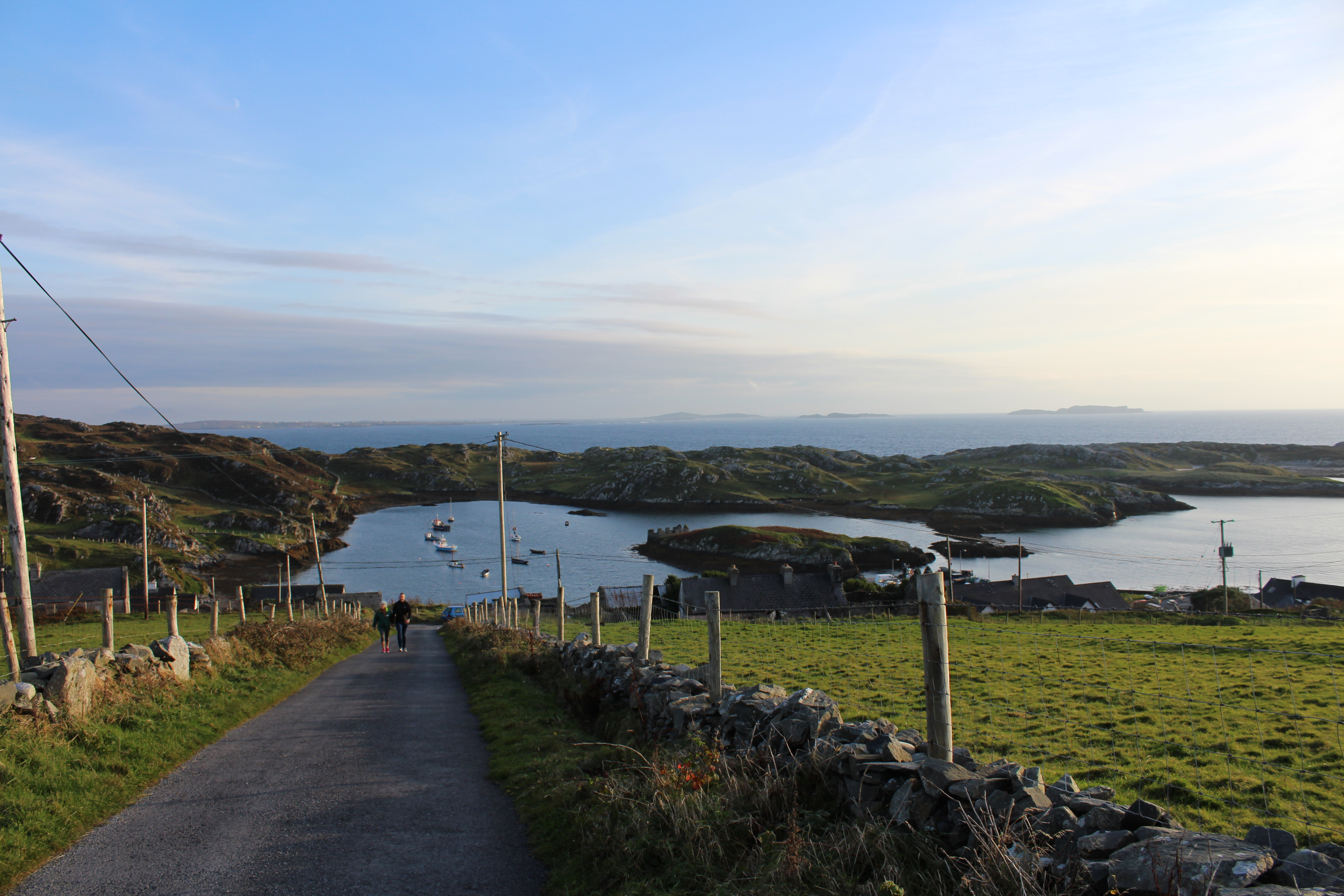
- Road above Inishbofin harbour

- Location within island of Ireland

Geography
- Location: Atlantic Ocean
- Coordinates: 53°37′N 10°12′W
- Area: 12 km^{2} (4.6 sq mi)
- Length: 5.5 km (3.42 mi)
- Width: 3 km (1.9 mi)
- Highest elevation: 70 m (230 ft)
- Highest point: Westquarter

Administration
- Ireland
- Province: Connacht
- County: Galway

Demographics
- Population: 184 (2022)

Inishbofin (Irish: Inis Bó Finne, meaning 'island of the white cow') is a small island off the coast of Connemara, County Galway, Ireland. Inishbofin has around 180 inhabitants and is a tourist destination.

== Name ==
The island's English name Inishbofin is derived from the Irish name Inis Bó Finne ('Island of the White Cow'). There are several legends about the name's origin. According to one, the island was actually a floating place until some fishermen landed on it in a fog. By bringing fire to the island, they dispelled the magic, fixing it in place. They then saw an old woman driving a white cow, which turned into a rock when the woman struck it with a stick.

The Irish name has also been anglicised as 'Innisboffin' and 'Boffin' or 'Bophin' island.

== Geology and topography ==
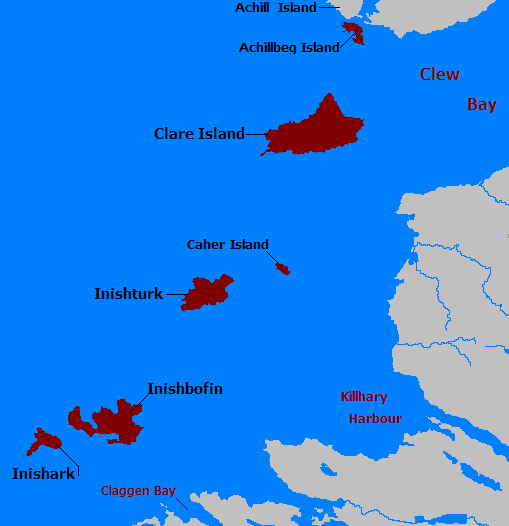
Islands off County Mayo-County Galway

Inishbofin lies around eight kilometres (4 1/2 nautical miles) off the Connemara coast opposite Ballynakill Harbour and Cleggan Bay. It is separated by a narrow channel from Inishark (Shark island). It is about 5.5 km (3 1/2 mi) long and 3 km (2 mi) wide. The highest point is in the Westquarter and rises to 89 metres (292 feet).

Much of the island is a Special Area of Conservation (due to the presence of corn crakes and seals). The island has no trees or forests. Any wood was cut down and used as heating fuel. Because of the salt-enriched air, trees were never able to reestablish themselves.

== History ==
It is not known when Inishbofin was first settled. There is no evidence of a Mesolithic, and only circumstantial evidence of a significant Neolithic presence. Although there are pre-historic field systems, their age has not been definitely established and could be anywhere between Bronze Age and early Medieval. Neolithic and Bronze Age monuments, found in significant numbers on the Connemara mainland, are conspicuous by their absence. Definite traces of human settlement are available only from the Iron Age onwards, such as the remains of promontory ring forts like 'Dun Mor'.

Around 665, Saint Colmán founded a monastery on Inishbofin. The island's ecclesiastical settlement was attacked by the Vikings in 795. According to some accounts, Guairim of Inisbofin was the ruler of the island when Colmán came here. The Annals of the Four Masters report the monastery's Abbots until the early 10th century (see below).

The island belonged to the O'Flahertys until 1380, when the O'Malleys captured it. In the 16th century, according to local tradition, a Spanish pirate or Barbary corsair named Alonzo Bosco built a stronghold on Port Island, where the Cromwellian fort stands today. According to the tales he raided the Irish coast and shipping in the area. "Don" Bosco was supposed to have been an ally of Gráinne O'Malley, chieftain of the O'Malley clan and 'Ireland's pirate queen'. One story had them stretching a defensive iron chain across Inishbofin's harbour entrance to make it impassable to enemy ships. Across the harbour entrance from Port Island sits 'Dún Gráinne', the fort where Gráinne O'Malley supposedly lived.

Eventually, Elizabethean forces took the island. In 1609, both Inishbofin and Inishark were the property of the Earl (or Marquis) of Clanricard (alternatively spelled Clanricarde or Clanrickard). The Marquis was of the de Burgo (Burke) family.

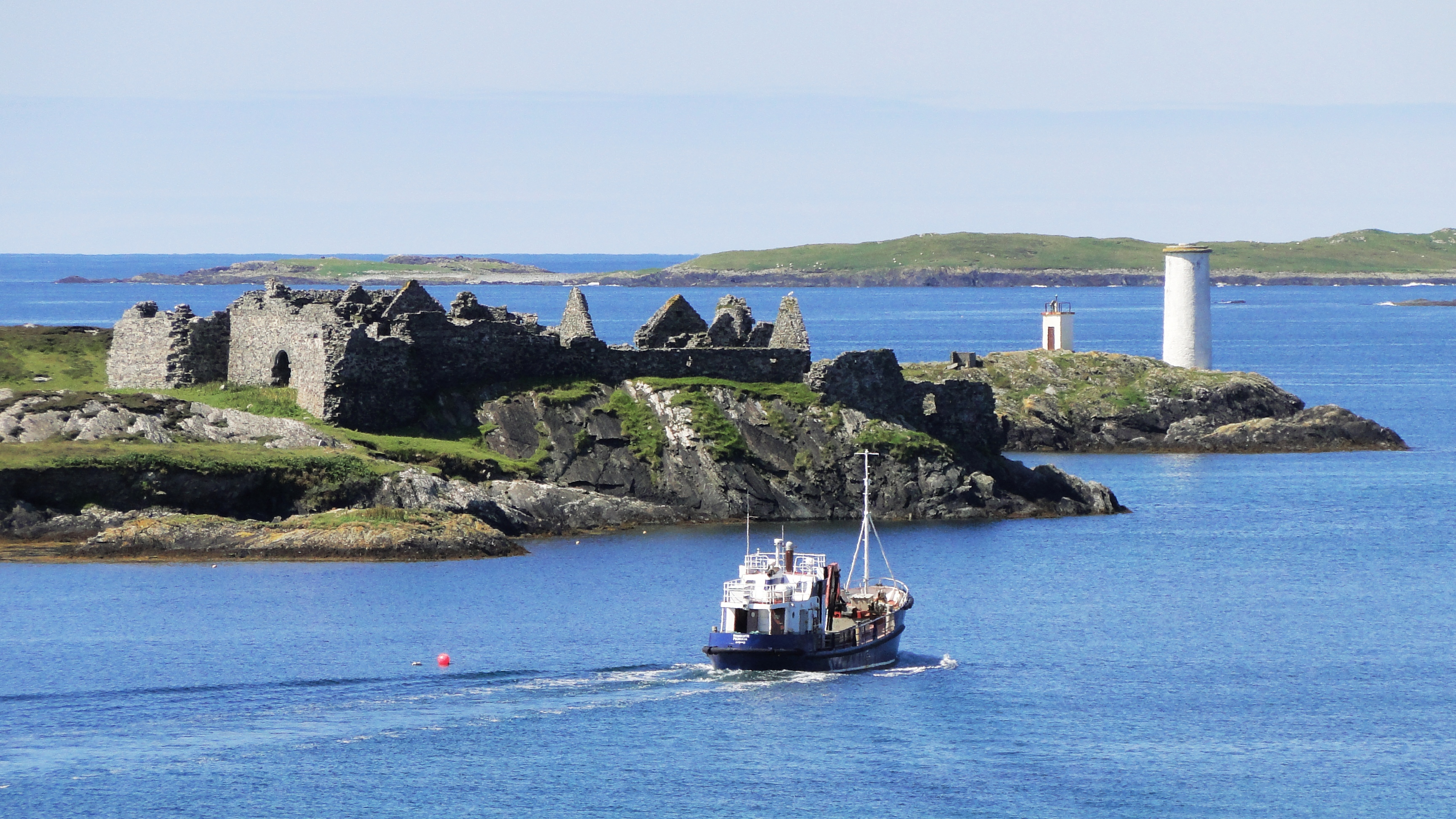
Inishbofin harbour, Port Island with Cromwell's Barracks and the light on Gun Rock, with Inis Goirt in the background

In the years of war following the Irish rebellion of 1641, the island was an important staging post for arms deliveries to the Irish Catholic rebels and their allies, the Royalists, from the Duke of Lorraine. The Royalists were supporters of King Charles I of England in the English Civil War against the Parliamentarians. In August 1649, the Parliamentarian forces under Oliver Cromwell had landed in Ireland and over the next few years conquered it. In early 1653, Cromwellian warships threatened to bombard the island and Inishbofin surrendered on 14 February to Sir John Reynolds. It was thus one of the last Royalist strongholds to fall to Cromwell's army. According to some accounts, after Galway had fallen in 1652, Rory O'Moore, one of the initiators of the 1641 rebellion fled to Inishbofin, where he lived in a cave.

After taking the island, the New Model Army turned Inishbofin into a prison camp for Roman Catholic priests arrested while exercising their religious ministry covertly in other parts of Ireland. The last priests held there were finally released following the Stuart Restoration in 1662.

Most of the star fort commanding the harbour dates from this period. It is known today as "Cromwell's Barracks" and was used, aside from its role as a prison, to protect the harbour against pirates and Dutch raiders (with whom the Protectorate was at war). At the time, a considerable fishery and whaling activity was based on the island.

In 1690, the fort was garrisoned during the Williamite War in Ireland by Jacobites, supporters of King James II of England. Commanded by one Colonel O'Riordan, they surrendered to King William's forces soon after the fall of Galway in 1691.

In 1779, a British ship carrying officers and new recruits of the 84th Regiment of Foot and the King's Orange Rangers, diverted from their planned course from Newfoundland to New York City during the American War of Independence, was blown off course and wrecked at Inishbofin (Royal Oak Cove). 56 of the soldiers died, many of the survivors deserted and were hunted down by troops from Westport.

Around 1830, Inishbofin passed from the possession of the Clanricards to the Browne family of Westport, descendants of the O'Malleys. In 1837, the island was in the Barony of Murrisk, County of Mayo, and Province of Connaught. It belonged to Howe Browne, 2nd Marquess of Sligo.

Circa 1855, George Browne sold the island to Henry William Wilberforce. Cyril Allies, an English Catholic, bought it from Wilberforce in 1876, after having held it in mortgage since 1859. It was eventually acquired by the Congested Districts Board for Ireland (later known as the Land Commission). The exact date is not known, but negotiations were "well advanced" by 1910.

As of 1 February 1873, Inishbofin (as in the Civil Parish of Inishbofin, which included Inishark) was no longer legally part of County Mayo but had become a part of County Galway. This was a consequence of a severe localised famine in the winter of 1872/3 which necessitated that relief be organised via the nearer Poor Law Union based in Clifden Workhouse rather than the previously responsible Poor Law Union based around Louisburgh Workhouse and in view of the particular concentration of distress in West Connemara and Inishbofin/Inishark.

=== Desecration of graves ===
In 1890, the island was visited by academics Alfred Cort Haddon and Andrew Francis Dixon (Dixon later became Professor of Anatomy at Trinity College Dublin), who removed partial skeletal remains of 13 people, including their skulls, from St Colman's monastery on the island without the knowledge or permission of the community. They did so under cover of darkness on 16 July 1890 for the purposes of studying craniometry. Thereafter the remains were stored in TCD's old anatomy museum until early 2023, when it was reported that more than 150 then-residents of Inisbofin had signed a petition calling for the return of the remains and condemned "the criminal nature of how these remains came into the possession of Trinity College in the first place". In February 2023, the provost of Trinity College, Linda Doyle, apologised for the upset caused by the university's possession of the remains and said the university would "consult with islanders on the most appropriate way to return them". The remains were returned to a delegation of island residents on 12 July 2023, with a view towards re-burying them in the place from which they had been stolen on 16 July 2023, 133 years to the day since their removal. Visual arts curator Ciarán Walsh, who spent over a decade researching the theft, said it was "the first event of its kind in Ireland and as far as the return of stolen human remains goes, (was) of international significance". Trinity College announced that its 'Colonial Legacies Working Group' would consider requests for the return of other skulls in the Haddon and Dixon Collection, from locations such as Oileán Árann and from St. Finian's Bay in South Kerry.

=== Demographics ===
The table below reports data on Inishbofin's population taken from Discover the Islands of Ireland (Alex Ritsema, Collins Press, 1999) and the Census of Ireland. Censuses in Ireland before 1841 are not considered complete and/or reliable.

Historical population

Year	Pop.	±%
1841	1,404	—
1851	909	−35.3%
1861	1,055	+16.1%
1871	663	−37.2%
1881	959	+44.6%
1891	874	−8.9%
1901	762	−12.8%
1911	691	−9.3%
1926	540	−21.9%

Year	Pop.	±%
1936	442	−18.1%
1946	339	−23.3%
1951	291	−14.2%
1956	281	−3.4%
1961	248	−11.7%
1966	247	−0.4%
1971	236	−4.5%
1979	203	−14.0%
1981	195	−3.9%

Year	Pop.	±%
1986	177	−9.2%
1991	181	+2.3%
1996	200	+10.5%
2002	178	−11.0%
2006	199	+11.8%
2011	160	−19.6%
2016	175	+9.4%
2022	184	+5.1%

Source: Central Statistics Office. "CNA17: Population by Off Shore Island, Sex and Year". CSO.ie.

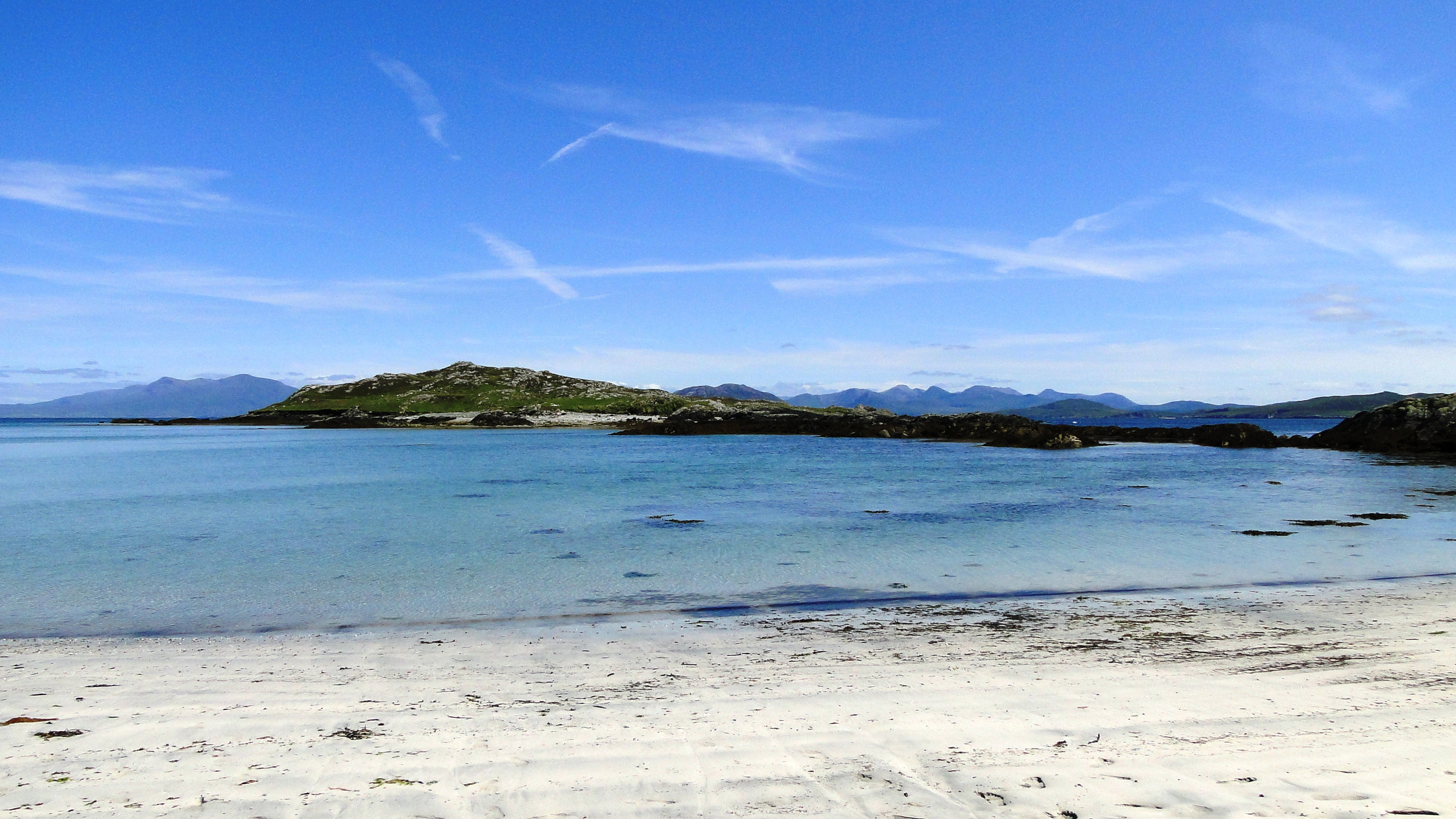
Dumhach Beach in the east of Inishbofin

The island's population has shrunk dramatically since pre-famine times. In 1837, 1462 people lived on Inishbofin. By 1881, the number was down to 959. In 1990, there were around 200 inhabitants; the 2011 census found just 160.

Today, tourism is the island's main industry. There are three hotels and a hostel on the island. Inishbofin offers scuba diving, walking trails, cycling, horse riding, sailing, paddle boarding, kayaking, snorkelling, shore and sea angling.

== Transport ==
Inishbofin can be reached by ferry from the pier in Cleggan. There is also a helipad, and an airstrip has been built on the island, but neither is licensed for use and general aviation pilots are forbidden to land on them.

== Culture and sports ==
The island features a Gaelic football pitch and a community centre with an indoor sports hall. It also houses a small island library which provides a reference and local studies collection with information on the history and heritage of the area.

Inishbofin hosted the All-Ireland Islands Football Tournament in 2008 and again in 2017. The current Galway Senior Men's Football team goalkeeper, Ruairi Lavelle, hails from Inishbofin. Another islander, Michael Day, also made his debut in midfield for the Senior team in 2017.

== Landmarks ==
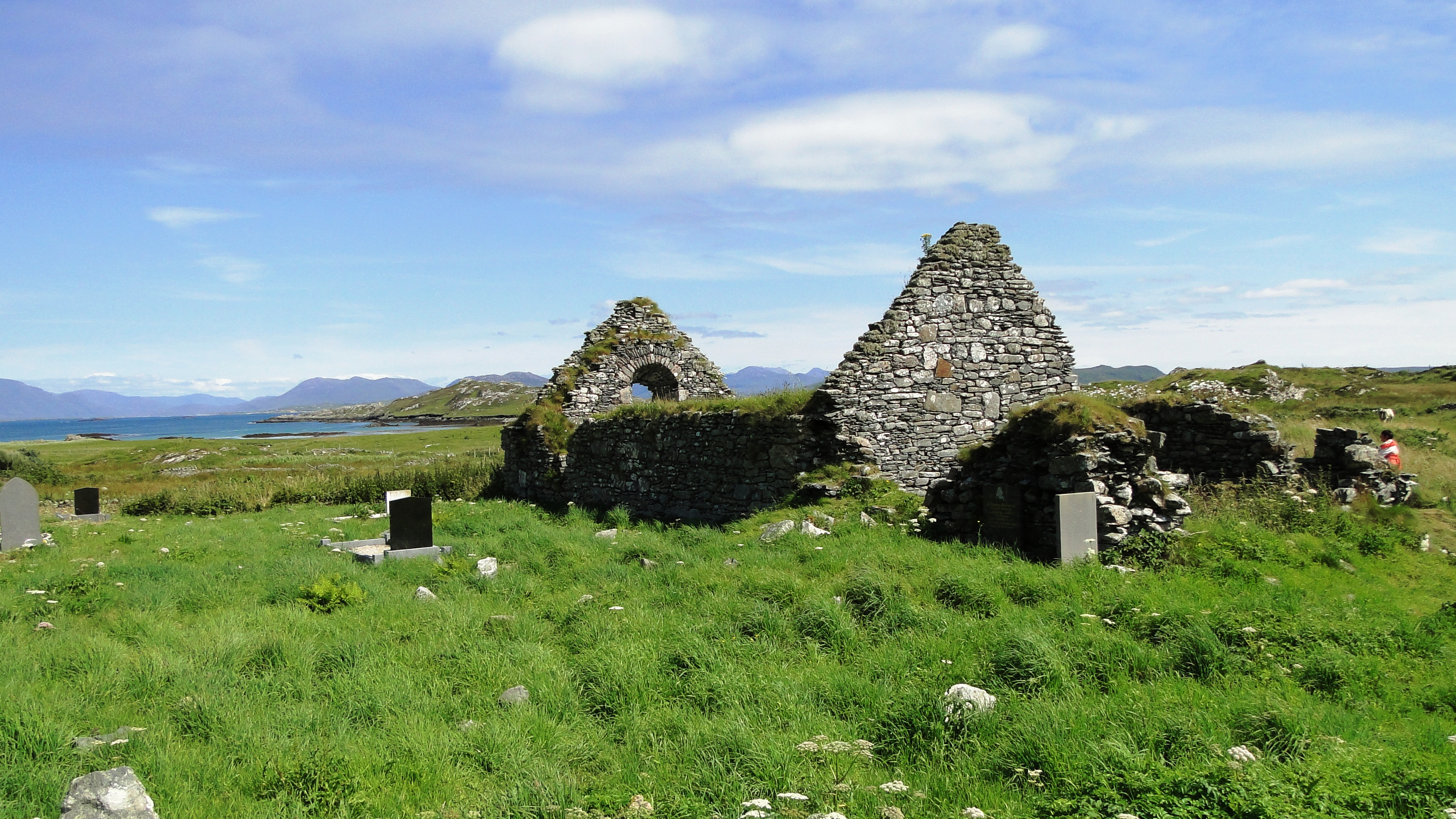
Ruins of a 13th-century church in St. Colman's Cemetery with the mountains of Connemara in the background

- Cromwell's Barracks
- St. Colmán's Cemetery (ruins of a 13th-century church at the site of the 7th century monastery)
- Light on Gun Rock (built in 1909). It was "swept away" by a storm on 3 January 2014.
- Dún Mór promontory ring fort
- Dún Gráinne
- The Stags seal colony

== Literature ==
The short story "The Hungry Death", written by Rosa Mulholland around 1880, is set in Inishbofin during the Great Famine. The story focuses on a love triangle before the backdrop of the famine and depicts the suffering and dying of the island population. It was republished in the collection The Art of the Glimpse: 100 Irish Short Stories (2020), edited by Sinéad Gleeson. Inishbofin was mentioned at some length by Irish artist and author Robert Gibbings, writing in 1946. He also referred in passing to some Inishbofin placenames that appear to be no longer extant, suggesting that the villages have vanished. These include Alladoon, Bunamullen, Cooltra, Mweelanbwee, and Ooghnagunnel. Seamus Heaney's poem "Seeing Things" begins with a boat ride to Inishbofin. "Inishbofin on a Sunday Morning. / Sunlight, turfsmoke, seagulls, boatslip, diesel". The island served as the setting for Deborah Tall's 1987 book The Island of the White Cow. Richard Murphy wrote several poems about his time on Inishbofin, of which the best known perhaps is 'Sailing to an Island'.

== Inishbofin in the Annals ==
- 668 - Colmán of Lindisfarne founds the monastery of Inis Bó Finne.
- 675 - Death of Colmán of Lindisfarne on Inis Bó Finne
- 711 - Baetan, Bishop of Inis Bo Finne, died.
- 755 - Mael Turaig, abbot of Inis Bó Finne, rested.
- 795 - The plundering of Í Coluim Chille, and of Inis Muiredaig, and of Inis Bó Finne.
- 898 - Caenchomhrac, of the caves of Inis Bo Fine, died.
- 809 - Blathmac of Inis Bó Finne, died.
- 916 - Abbot Feardhach of Inis Bó Finne, died.

== Notable people ==
- Fr. Martin Glynn (1729–1794), Roman Catholic priest, rector of the Irish College in Bordeaux and Catholic martyr during the Dechristianisation of France
- Guairim of Inisbofin (fl. 7th century), Irish clan chief and Lord of the island
- Leo of Inis Airc (fl. 7th century), early Medieval Irish saint
- Fr. Robert Nugent (1574–1652), Irish Jesuit mission superior during the Irish Confederate Wars who died upon Inishbofin in 1652.
- Dessie O'Halloran (1940–2019), Irish singer and musician
- Patrick Eugene Prendergast (1868–1894), assassin of Chicago Mayor Carter Harrison III
- Scaithin, early Medieval Irish saint

== See also ==
- List of abbeys and priories in the Republic of Ireland (County Galway)
- Repatriation and reburial of Irish human remains

== Gallery ==
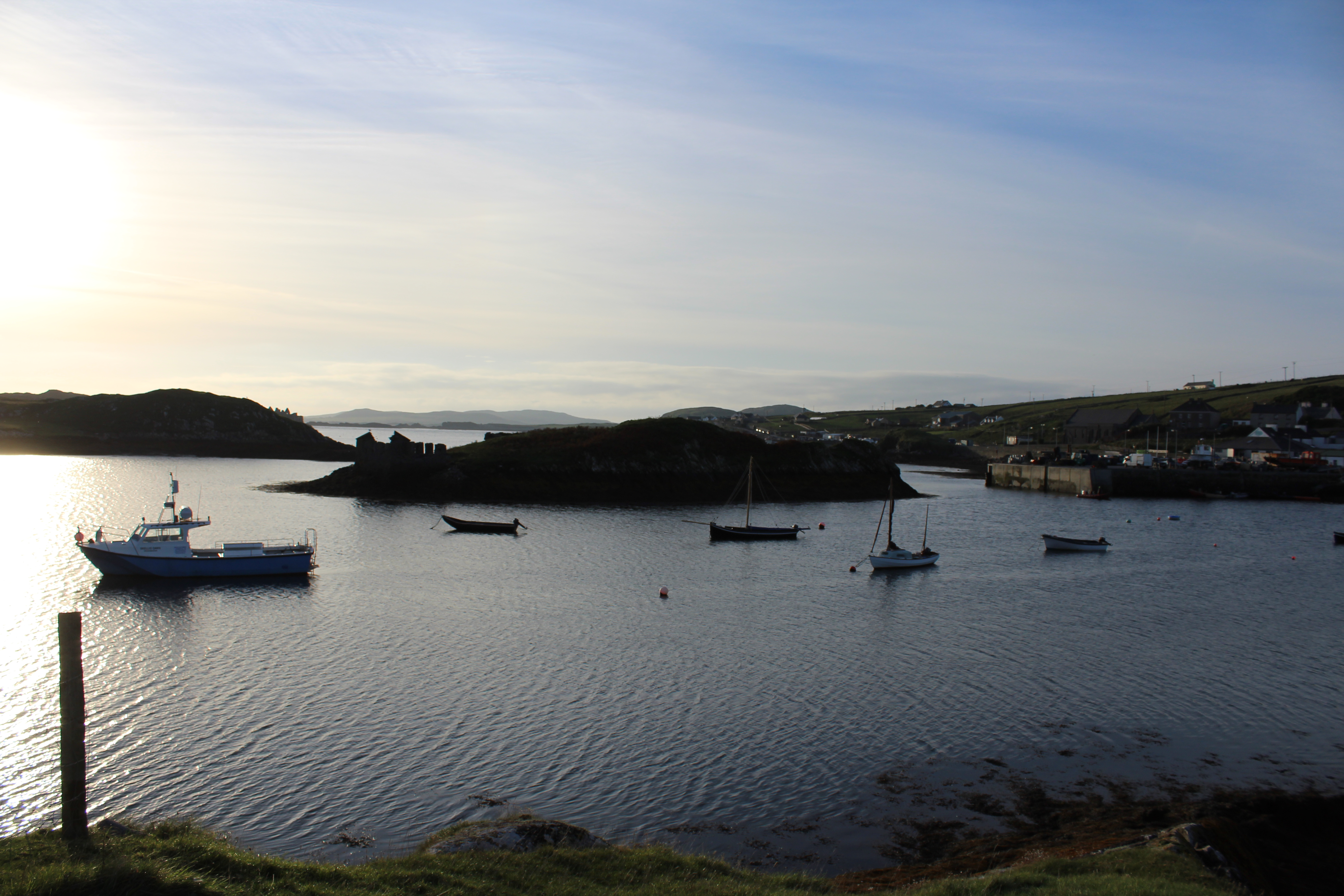
Inishbofin harbour

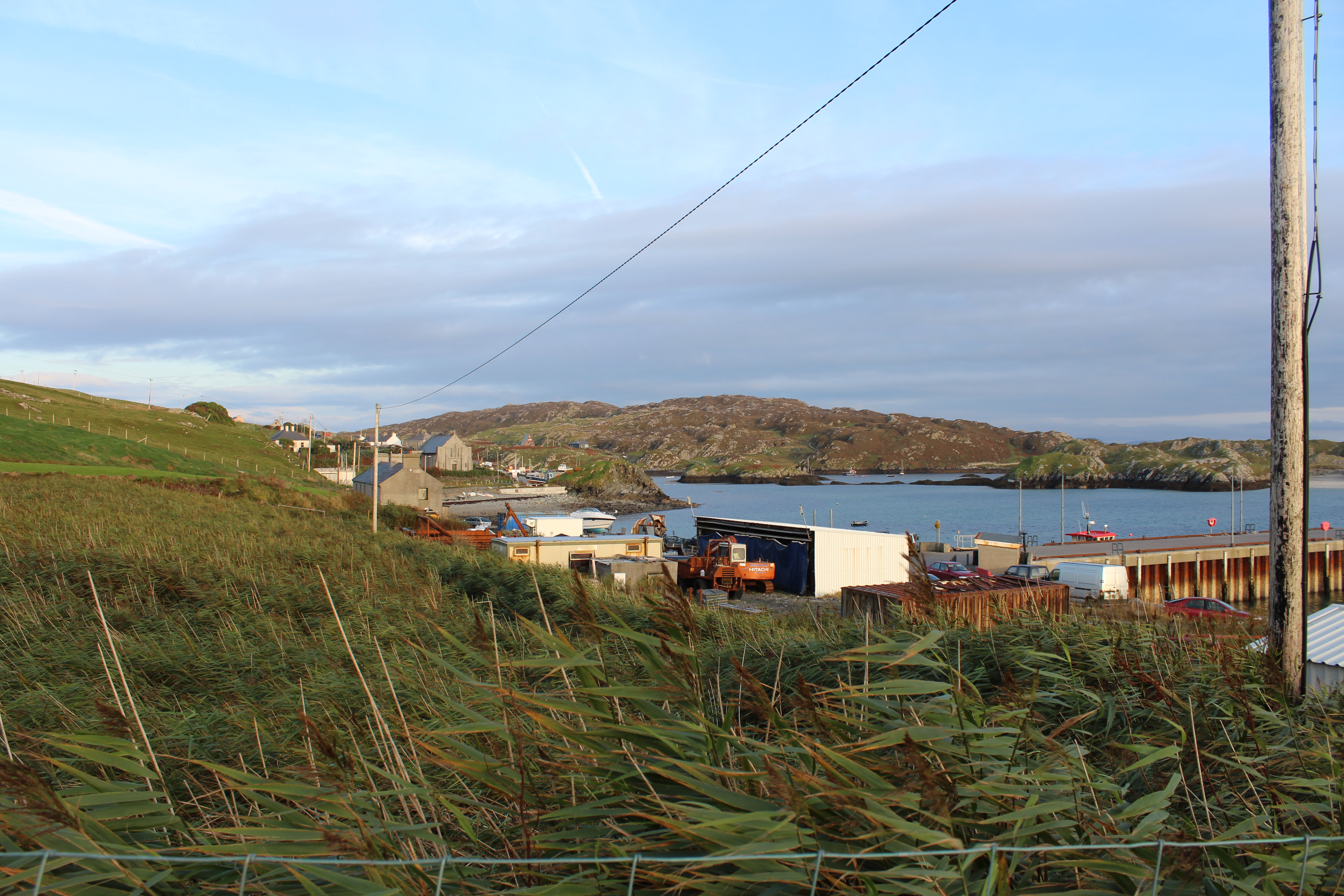
Inishbofin harbour

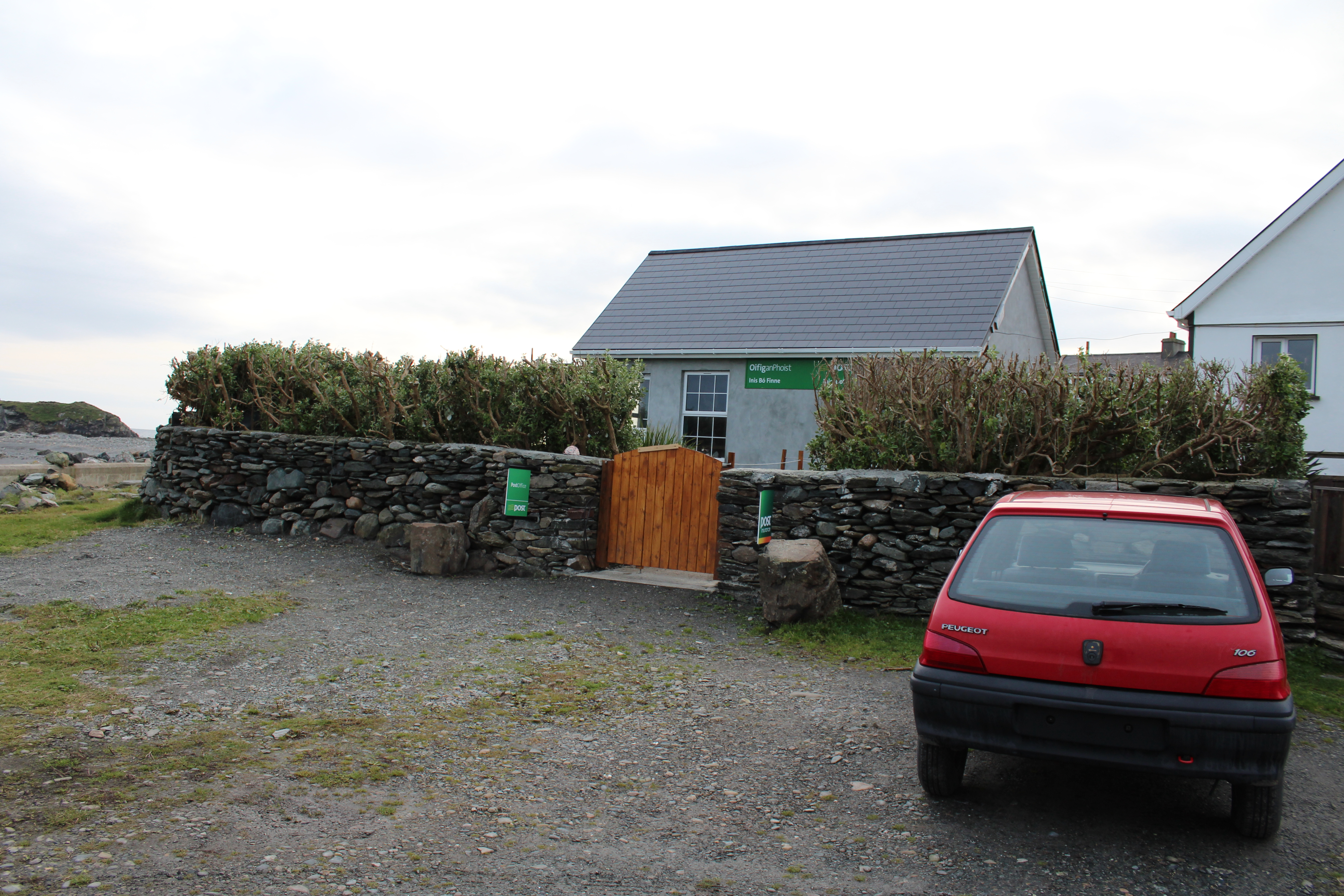
Post office in 2016

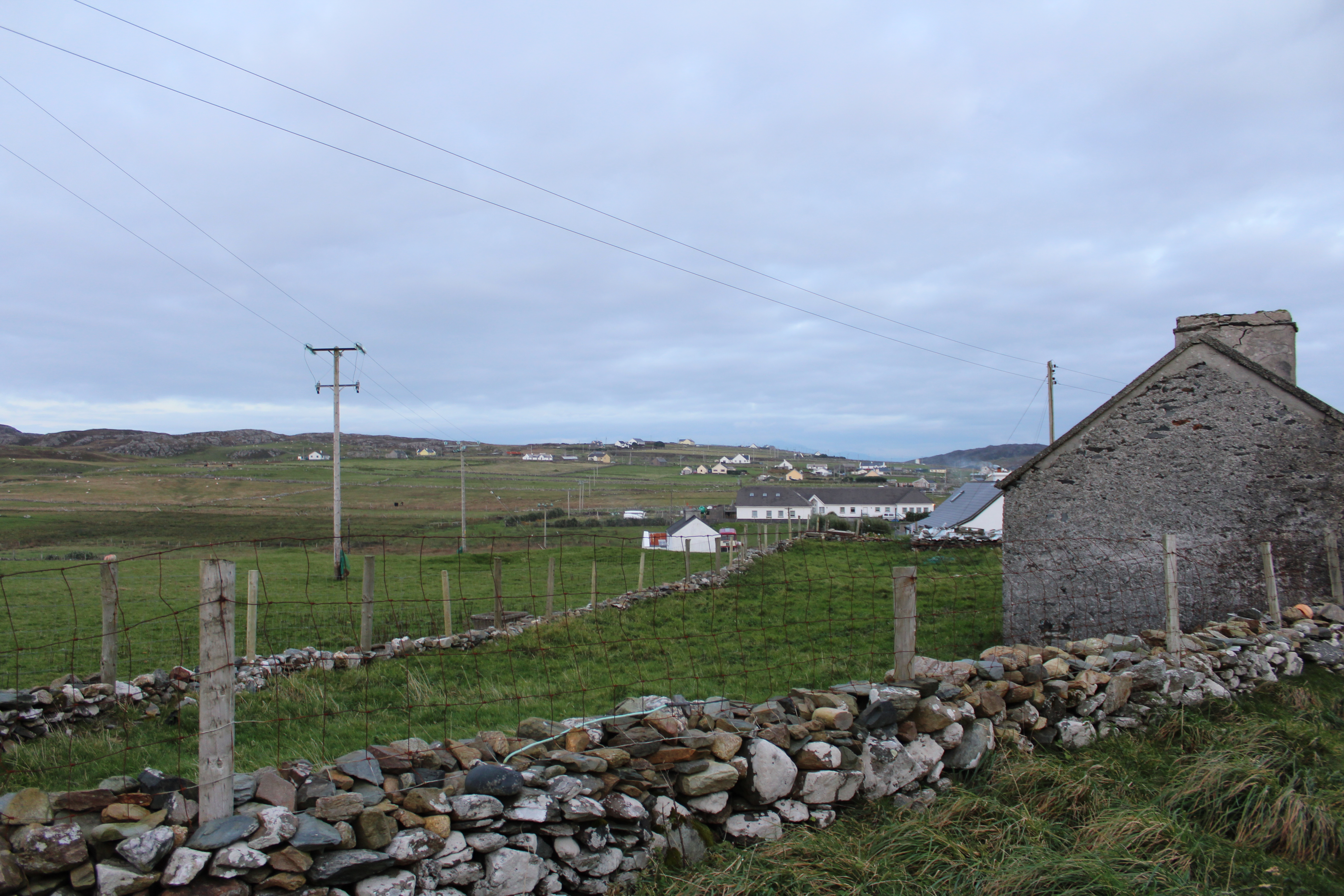
Houses on Inishbofin
