= Cleggan =

Village in County Galway, Ireland

Cleggan An Cloigeann
- Village
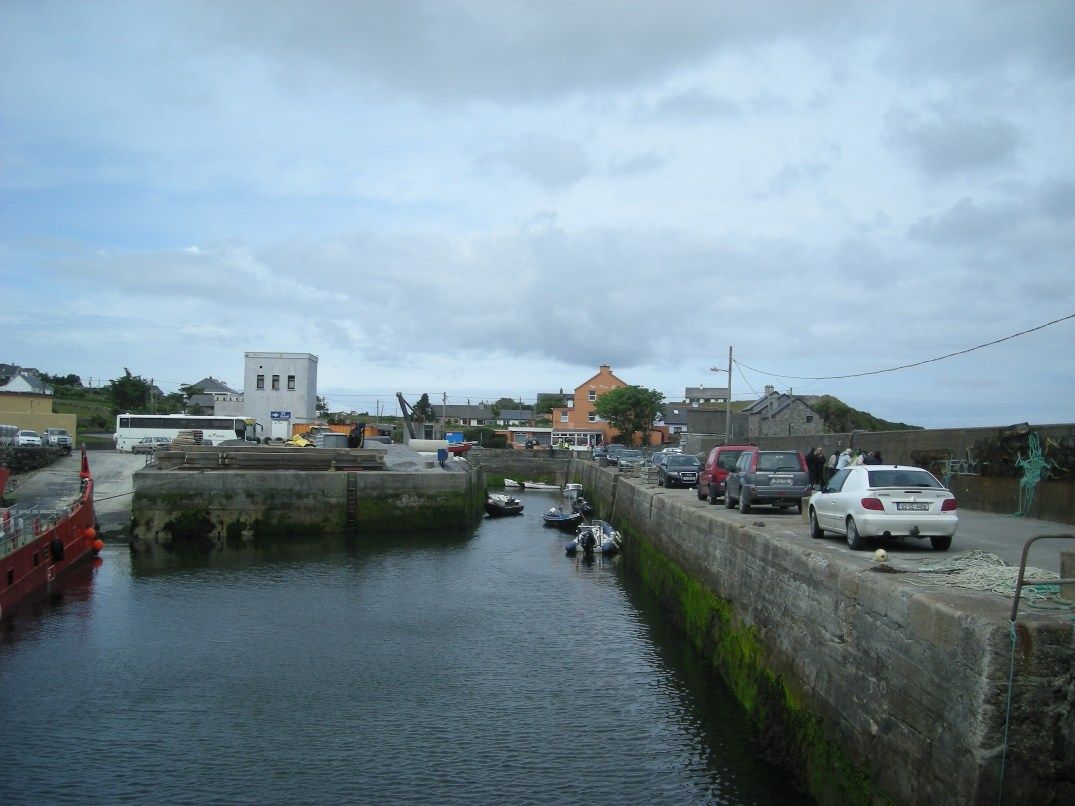
- Pier and harbour

- Location in Ireland
- Coordinates: 53°33′00″N 10°07′00″W
- Country: Ireland
- Province: Connacht
- County: County Galway
- Elevation: 68 m (223 ft)
- Time zone: UTC+0 (WET)
  - Summer (DST): UTC-1 (IST (WEST))
- Irish Grid Reference: L597576

Cleggan (Irish: An Cloigeann, meaning 'the headland') is a fishing village in County Galway, Ireland. The village lies 10 km (6 mi) northwest of Clifden and is situated at the head of Cleggan Bay.

A focal point of the village is the pier, built by Alexander Nimmo in 1822 and extended in 1908. Ferries leave the pier daily for Inishbofin there is also a ferry to Inishturk.

== History ==
An Cloigeann means head or skull, apparently referring to the coastal headland. Legend, however, provides a different origin of the name. St. Ceannanach is said to have been beheaded by a pagan chief. Lore has it that the chief then picked up his head and took it to the Holy Well in Clooncree where he washed it before lying down to die. At the top of Cleggan head, which gives a commanding view of the harbour, is the remains of a watchtower constructed during the Napoleonic Wars.

In 1927, in what became known as the Cleggan Bay Disaster, 25 fishermen from the local area drowned during a great gale which arose without warning while they were mackerel fishing in the bay. The nearby village of Rossadilisk lost sixteen men and was subsequently abandoned. Nine men from Inishbofin and twenty men from County Mayo were also lost. Due to the death of so many breadwinners, the area was devastated. The disaster and the devastation visited on the local families made international news and funds were raised from as far away as the U.K., U.S. and Australia. The disaster is remembered in stories, poems and on stone markers. It was recorded by local Marie Feeney in her book "The Cleggan Bay Disaster", by TG4 Documentary "The Cleggan Disaster" / "An Báthadh Mór" directed by Petra Conroy, and remembered in Richard Murphy's poem "The Cleggan Disaster", from his 1963 book "Sailing to an Island". Irish singer/songwriter Saoirse Mhór wrote the song "The Cleggan Bay Disaster" (Greenhill Media 2013) which was the title track of the 2013 release by the German/Irish Folk band Fleadh.

Offshore, the island of Inishbofin can be reached by boat from Cleggan pier. Inishbofin has a population of about 200 people. In 665 St. Coleman founded a monastery on the island. A roofless thirteenth century chapel in the present day graveyard is believed to be the site of his monastery. The harbour entrance of the island is dominated by the Cromwellian fort which was a prison camp for Catholic priests. The island also holds the remains of castle built by the "pirate queen" Gráinne O'Malley.

A notable feature of the physical geography around Cleggan is blanket bog. Few plant species can live in the acid condition of the bog, but those that can form a vegetation not found outside Ireland.

Near Cleggan is a collection of prehistoric monuments including tombs, standing stones and walls.

== Economy ==
Cleggan now receives more tourists, but traditionally the main source of income in the village has been fishing, supplemented by farming, which is difficult in the area's soil. Fishing continues to be an important industry. The village has four bars, one grocer and a sit-down restaurant, as well as a seasonal take-out. In addition to trips to the local islands, leisure activities for visitors include horseback riding and fishing.

== Famous residents ==
- James Morrissey, PR agent and spokesperson for Denis O'Brien, owns a house in Cleggan.
- Micheál Mac Suibhne (1760-1842) poet who composed his work in Connacht Irish.

== See also ==
- Claddaghduff
- Connemara
- Ballynakill Lough
- List of towns and villages in Ireland
