= Muckanaghederdauhaulia =

Townland in County Galway, Ireland

Muckanaghederdauhaulia Muiceanach idir Dhá Sháile
- Townland
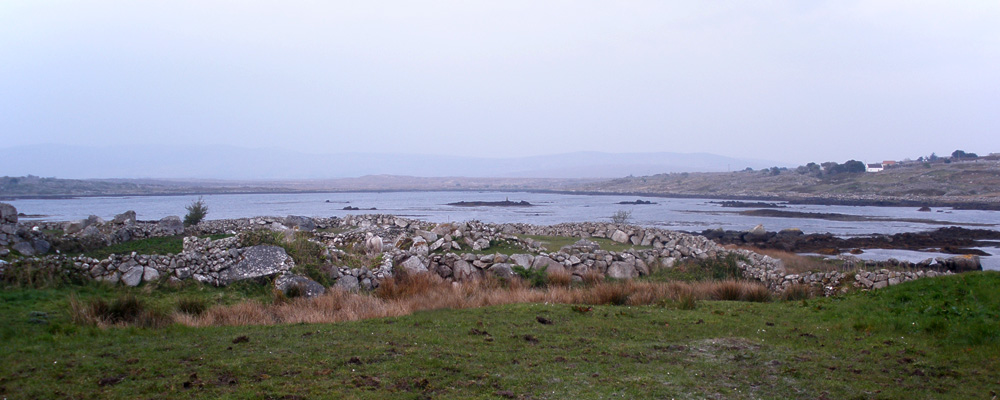
- Looking over Camus Bay at Muiceanach idir Dhá Sháile

- Location in Ireland
- Coordinates: 53°20′28″N 9°34′09″W
- Country: Ireland
- Province: Connacht
- County: County Galway

Area
  - Total: 203.5 ha (503 acres)
- Irish Grid Reference: L955334

Muckanaghederdauhaulia (Irish: Muiceanach idir Dhá Sháile, meaning 'pig-marsh between two sea inlets') is a 503-acre (204 ha) townland in the civil parish of Kilcummin in County Galway, Ireland. It is in the poor law union of Oughterard in the Barony of Moycullen.

== Name and location ==
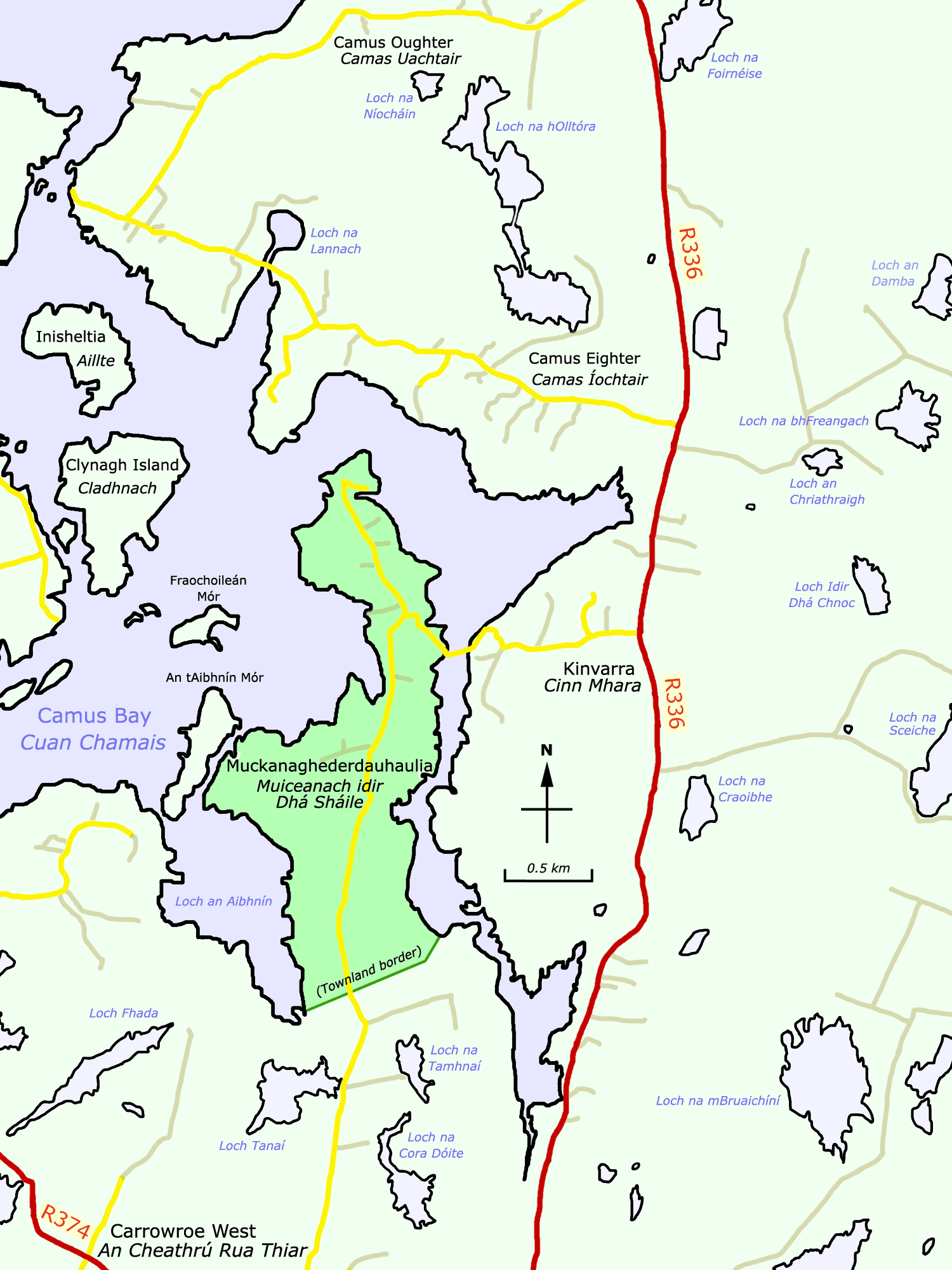
Map of Muiceanach idir Dhá Sháile

It was formerly regarded as the longest place name (in English) in Ireland (22 letters), but awareness of longer names has challenged Muckanaghederdauhaulia. There was a hamlet within the townland which had the same name in Irish (Muiceanach idir Dhá Sháile), but a shorter English name, Mucknasalia. The 1911 census enumerator spelled it Muckenaghedderdahaulia (23 letters) though the published report uses the 22-letter spelling.

The townland lies on a low, boggy peninsula in Camus Bay and can be reached by turning west from the R336 road at Cinn Mhara, or by going northwest on the R374 road out of Casla, then turning onto Bóthar na Scratóg and going north.

== Population ==
The population recorded in those census reports which provided figures at townland level were as follows:

Census year	1841	1851	1861	1871	1881	1891	1901	1911
Population	103	81	79	80	111	85	101	111

== In popular culture ==
The area is mentioned in Georges Perec's novel Life: A User's Manual: "In between, there had been the little harbour of Muckanaghederdauhaulia, not far from Costelloe, in Ireland’s Camus Bay...".

The townland is home to the Sean nós singer Micheál Ó Confhaola, three-time winner of the Corn Uí Riada.

== See also ==
- List of longest placenames in Ireland
