= Moycullen (disambiguation) =

Moycullen is a village in County Galway, Ireland.

Moycullen may also refer to:

- Moycullen (barony) - a barony in County Galway, see List of baronies of Ireland
- Moycullen (civil parish) - a civil parish in the barony of the same name
- Moycullen (Catholic parish) - an ecclesiastical parish of the Catholic Church roughly coterminous with the above civil parish
- Moycullen GAA - a club of the Gael Athletic Association in the above parish
- Moycullen Basketball Club, in the village
