= List of longest placenames in Ireland =

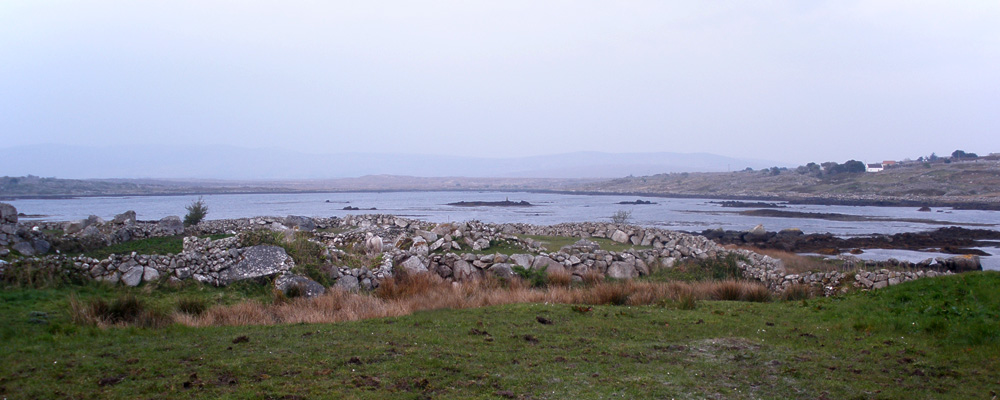
Muiceanach idir Dhá Sháile (Muckanaghederdauhaulia) in County Galway, Ireland

This is a list of the longest place names in Ireland. It includes names written in English as a single word of at least 20 letters. The vast majority of English-language place names in Ireland are anglicisations of Irish language names. The spelling which has legal force is usually that used by the Ordnance Survey of Ireland. Many of Ireland's longest place names are found in the far west of the island, where the Irish language has survived the longest; including Gaeltacht areas, where it is still the vernacular. These names are generally written as multiple words in Irish.

At 22 letters long, Muckanaghederdauhaulia (from Muiceanach idir Dhá Sháile meaning "pig-marsh between two saltwaters") is often believed to be Ireland's longest one-word place name. In Life: A User's Manual by Georges Perec, it is one of the ports visited and painted by the character Bartlebooth, who believes it to be the longest port name in the world. An 1830s boundary survey uses the spelling Mwickanaghedderauhaulia, which is 23 letters long.

However, the Placenames Database of Ireland (logainm.ie) records several other place names of at least 22 letters. Furthermore, the anglicised form Muckanaghederdauhaulia ceased to have official standing in 2005, after a Placenames Order was made under the Official Languages Act 2003; the sole official name is now the Irish form Muiceanach idir Dhá Sháile.

Multiple-word place names may be longer still. For example, "Plughoge and Leabrannagh Mountain North", the name of a townland in County Donegal, has 35 letters, and its Irish equivalent "Sliabh Phlochóige agus Leadhb Reannach Thuaidh" has 41; while "Stack's to Mullaghareirk Mountains, West Limerick Hills and Mount Eagle Special Protection Area 004161" has 81 letters and 6 digits.

== List ==
The spellings and locations given in the table are those on the Ordnance Survey's current and historic maps. Three of the top names are at the ruins on Inishmore of the church dedicated of the Four Comely Saints (an Ceathrar Álainn).

English	Letters	Irish	Type	Location: county, barony, civil parish, townland
Bullaunancheathrairaluinn	25	Ballán an Cheathrair Álainn	Bullaun	Galway, Aran, Inishmore, Oghil
Sruffaunoughterluggatoora	25	Sruthán Uachtar Log an tSamhraidh	Stream	Galway, Ballynahinch, Moyrus, Glencoaghan
Sruffaungolinluggatavhin	24	Sruthán Góilín Log an Tafainn	Stream	Galway, Ballynahinch, Moyrus, Glencoaghan
Templeancheathrairaluinn	24	Teampall an Cheathrair Álainn	Ruined church	Galway, Aran, Inishmore, Oghil
Loughaunbarnaheskabaunia (Note: Spelt "Loughaunbaurnaheskabaunia" (25 letters) by John O'Donovan.)	24	Lochán Bairr na h-Eascaide Báine	Lake	Galway, Ballynahinch, Ballynakill, Kylemore
Glasheencummeennapeasta Stream	23	Glaisín Coimín na Péiste	Stream	Kerry, Dunkerron North, Knockane, Meallis
Leabaancheathrairaluinn	23	Leaba an Cheathrair Álainn	Ruined grave	Galway, Aran, Inishmore, Oghil
Sruffaunloughaunnaveagh	23	Sruthán Lochán na bh-Fiach	Stream	Galway, Ballynahinch, Ballynakill, Addergoole
Carrickwilliamodonnell	22	Carraig Liam Uí Dhónaill	Rock	Galway, Moycullen, Moycullen, Derryloughaun East
Lough Clougherbowbartleymede	22	Loch Chlochar Bó Bhairtliméid	Lake	Galway, Ballynahinch, Moyrus, Lettershinna
Cooneenskerragohiffern	22	Cuainín Sciorradh-go-hIfreann	Harbour	Mayo, Murrisk, Kilgeever, Lettereeragh
Glassillaunvealnacurra	22	Glas Oileán Bhéal na Cora (uncertain)	Townland	Galway, Ballynahinch, Ballindoon & Islands, Glassillaunvealnacurra
Illaungraffanavrankagh	22	(uncertain)	Townland	Clare, Burren, Gleninagh, Illaungraffanavrankagh
Loughaunfiddaunbuntack	22	Lochán Fheadán Bhun tSaic	Lake	Mayo, Burrishoole, Achill, Srahmore
Muckanaghederdauhaulia	22	Muiceanach idir Dhá Sháile	Townland	Galway, Moycullen, Kilcummin, Muckanaghederdauhaulia
Drehideenglashanatooha Bridge	22	Droichidín Glas na Tuatha	Bridge	Tipperary, Middle third, Ardmayle, Camus / Tipperary, Clanwilliam, Ballygriffin, Ballynahinch
Mainistirnambratherbeg (Note: Spelled Mainistirnambratherbeg (22 letters) on the 1901 Ordnance Survey map; Manisternabratherbeg (20 letters) in the Placenames Database of Ireland.)	22	Mainistir na mBráthar Beag	Ruin	Limerick, Clanwilliam, Rochestown, Friarstown
Monasternagalliaghduff	22	Mainistir na gCailleach Dubh	Ruin	Limerick, Shanid, Robertstown, Oldabbey
Sruffaunnabolybaunia	22	Sruthán na Buaile Baine	Stream	Galway, Ballynahinch, Ballynakill, Lemnaheltia
Ballywinterrourkewood	21	Coill Bhaile Mhuintir Ruairc	Townland	Limerick, Connello Lower, Rathkeale, Ballywinterrourkewood
Lough Booroughcummeenauragh	21		Lake	Kerry, Magunihy, Killarney, Ullauns / Poulagower
Carrickemonmacdonagha	21	Carraig Éamainn Mhic Dhonncha	Rock	Galway, Aran, Inishmore, Brannock Island
Carrickmoylenacurhoga	21	Carraig Bhéal na gCaróg	Rock	Mayo, Erris, Kilmore, Carrickawilt Island
Carricknagalliaghduff	21	Carraig na gCailleach Dubh	Rock	Mayo, Erris, Kilmore, Duvillaun More (Island)
Cloghculliaghfrankagh	21	Cloch a' coilleach, Frangcach	Rock	Galway, Dunkellin, Killeely, Roevehagh
Corragunnagalliaghdoo Island	21	Carraigín na gCailleach Dubh	Townland	Mayo, Burrishoole, Burrishoole, Corragunnagalliaghdoo Island
Fiddauntawnynagalloge	21	Feadán na nGealóg	Stream	Mayo, Tirawley, Doonfeeny, Belderg More
Glashacummeennagashel Stream	21		Stream	Kerry, Dunkerron North, Knockane, Coomcallee
Illauncreevnalarragan	21	Oileán Craoibhe na Leargan	Island in lake	Galway, Moycullen, Killannin, Gortmore
Illaunpreaghaunnagark	21	Oileán Phreacháin na g-cearc	Island in lake	Galway, Moycullen, Moycullen, Gortachalla
Mullauncarrickscoltia	21		Rock	Galway, Ballynahinch, Ballindoon & Islands
Ooghinneendonnellduff	21	Uaich Iníon Dhónaill Dhuibh	Inlet	Mayo, Erris, Kilmore, Inishkea South
Sruffaunbrandraghmore	21	Sruthán Brannach Mór	Stream	Galway, Ballynahinch, Ballynakill, Cloonlooaun
Sruffauneskernaleegha	21	Srothán Eiscir na Liatha	Stream	Galway, Ballynahinch, Ballynakill, Kylemore
Sruffaunnambrackdeony	21	Sruthán na mBreac Deamhnaí	Stream	Galway, Moycullen, Moycullen, Oghery
Sruffaunnamuingabalia	21		Stream	Mayo, Tirawley, Moygawnagh, Laghtanvack
Sruffaunnavonseebegga	21	Sruthán na bhFonsaí Beaga	Stream	Galway, Ballynahinch, Moyrus, Glencoaghan
Sruffaunrulardheemore	21	Sruthán Rolardaí Mór	Stream	Galway, Ballynahinch, Moyrus, Glencoaghan
Sruffaunpollnacolmore	21		Stream	Galway, Ballynahinch, Ballynakill, Kylemore
Sruffaunhullynabaunia	21		Stream	Galway, Ballynahinch, Ballynakill, Kylemore
Sruffaunscalpnagollum	21	Sruthán Scailp na gColm	Stream	Galway, Ballynahinch, Moyrus, Gleninagh
Sruffauntruskanalower	21	Srubhthán trusca na Leabhar	Stream	Galway, Moycullen, Moycullen, Finisklin / Slieveaneena
Ardloughnabrackbaddy	20	Ard Loch na mBreac Beadaí	Peak	Donegal, Kilmacrenan, Tullaghobegly, Tullaghobegly Irish
Athwullaghheedonnell Lough	20		Lake	Galway, Ballynahinch, Ballindoon & Islands, Slieveburke
Bealraghnathreesrugh (Note: Spelt "Bealraghnathressrugh" by Place Names NI.)	20		Minor feature	Fermanagh, Magherastephana, Aghalurcher, Altnaponer
Carrickacushcamemore	20	(uncertain)	Rock	Mayo, Murrisk, Kilgeever, Garranty (Note: On Inishturk.)
Carrickbriendurragha	20	Carraig Bhriain Dorcha	Rock	Donegal, Boylagh, Templecrone, Braade
Carrickillaunnascalp	20	Carraig Oileán na Scailpe	Rock	Galway, Moycullen, Kilcummin, Derravonniff
Carricknagalliaghdoo	20		Rock	Mayo, Burrishoole, Achill, Doogort West
Carrigeenmoylenanagh	20	Carraig Mheall na nEach	Rock	Mayo, Erris, Kilmore, Inishkea South
Carrigfoilaphreesoon	20		Rock	Cork, Carbery West (W.D.), Kilmoe, Dunlough
Carrigillaunyrahilly	20	Carraig Léin Ní Rathaille	Rock	Kerry, Dunkerron South, Kilcrohane, Coomatloukane
Carrowkeelanahaglass	20	Ceathrú Chaol an Atha Ghlais	Townland	Galway, Ballymoe, Dunmore, Carrowkeelanahaglass
Cartroncarrowntogher	20	(uncertain)	Townland	Roscommon, Frenchpark, Kilmacumsy, Cartroncarrowntogher
Coosfohermarenabinia	20	Cuas Foithir Mhór na Binne	Cove	Kerry, Corkaguiny, Garfinny, Beenbane
Crockballaghnagrooma	20		Hill	Tyrone, Omagh East, Termonmaguirk, Sluggan
Cummernabarnadarriga Glen	20	Comar na Bearnan Deirge	Valley	Kerry, Iveragh, Glanbehy, Carriginane/Neesha
Foildermotycronacane	20	Faill Diarmada	Cliff	Cork, Carbery West (East Division), Clear Island, Ballyieragh South
Gubpaudeenshaneneese	20	Gob Pháidín Sheáin Aonghais	Headland	Mayo, Burrishoole, Achill, Derreen
Lisheennagranshymore	20	Lisín na ghrainsigh mhóir	Ancient burial ground	Galway, Leitrim, Duniry, Grange More
Knockaunshaunmaconry	20	Cnocán Sheaain Mhic Conroi	Hill	Galway, Moycullen, Kilcummin, Callownamuck
Knockavanniamountain	20	Sliabh Chnoc an Bhainne	Townland	Waterford, Glenahiry, Seskinan, Knockavanniamountain
Lackshivaunnageelagh	20	Leac Shiobhán na nGeimhleach	Minor feature	Kerry, Corkaguiny, Dingle, Emlagh East
Mallgarveheamushwaun	20	Meall Garbh Shéamuis bain	Island	Galway, Ballynahinch, Ballindoon & Islands, Leaghcarrick / Ballyconneely
Minnaunballyconneely	20	Móinín Baile Conghaile	Skerry	Galway, Ballynahinch, Ballindoon & Islands, Bunowen Beg
Monasterkieran or Monasterconnaughtagh	20	Teampall Chiaráin	Ruined church	Galway, Aran, Inishmore, Oghil
Newtownmoneenluggagh	20	(uncertain)	Townland	Kildare, Ikeathy and Oughterany, Scullogestown
Poulillaundonaghbane	20	Oileán Dhonncha Bháin	Island	Kerry, Iveragh, Dromod, Kealafreaghane West
Scartnadrinymountain	20	Barr na Scairte	Townland	Waterford, Decies-without-Drum, Kilgobnet, Scartnadrinymountain
Sruffaungortarusheen	20	Sruthán Goirt a Ruisín	Stream	Galway, Ballynahinch, Ballynakill, Kylemore
Sruffaunmaumnavonsee	20	Sruthán Mhám na bhFonsaí	Stream	Galway, Ballynahinch, Moyrus, Glencoaghan
Sruffaunlugganaffrin	20	Sruthan Loig an Aiffrinn	Stream	Galway, Ballynahinch, Omey, Aillenaveagh
Sruffaunmuinganierin	20		Stream	Mayo, Tirawley, Kilfian, Shanettra / Mayo, Tirawley, Moygawnagh, Corvoley
Sruhauncloghacappeen	20		Stream	Mayo, Murrisk, Kilgeever, Derreennanalbanagh
Stookalargachuitread	20		Sea stack	Donegal, Kilmacrenan, Clondavaddog, Doagh Beg
Tobernashaghtninneen	20	Tobar na Seacht nIníon	Holy well	Galway, Ross, Ross, Munterowen East

== Variant, historical, and spurious spellings ==
John O'Donovan recommended "Illaunloughmorenavreaghoge" (26 letters) as the name of an island in "Loughnavreeghougue" in Clynagh townland, Killannin parish, Moycullen barony, County Galway. He noted "Illaunloughmorenavreeghougue" (28 letters) as the local spelling. However, the Ordnance Survey went with "Lough Morenavreaghoge" for the lake, and left the island unnamed, while the Irish Placenames Database gives the name "Illaunmore" for an island in Clynagh.

Two lakes called "Loughs Nahaskanabaunia" on the Ordnance Survey map correspond to the entry "Loughsnahaskanabaunia" (21 letters) in the Placenames Database. The townland of Brackagh Slieve Gallion in County Londonderry has sometimes been written as one 21-letter word, Brackaghslievegallion, or similar. Similarly, Lisbellanagroagh More in County Antrim has been written Lisbellanagroaghmore (20 letters).

An 1829 calendar of Stuart patent rolls in the Irish Chancery includes Knockatoodreknocknynuyshaneboye (31 letters) and Aghannyquillaknockacarnoc (25 letters) from 1611 as subdenominations within "Gortnemureknock" (now Gortinure and Knocks) County Fermanagh; Grangeballaghmarramacquoid (26 letters) in Armagh in 1616; and Ballylirstrillyvickenratty (26 letters) for Tullymacarath, County Down in 1609. The spelling Ballemickegillemorreyietragh (28 letters; later "Ballymackilmurry etra" in the townland of Ballymackilmurry) is recorded in a 1609 inquisition into the churchlands of County Armagh made in preparation for the Plantation of Ulster. Salters Grange, County Armagh is called Grangeballaghmarramacquoid (26 letters) in inquisitions of 1557 and 1614. The 1654 Civil Survey of County Tipperary records Glayshlackeenetanballyuore (26 letters) as the name of a "small brooke" forming part of the boundary of Oughterleague parish by the townland of Demone; Aghknockanecurryheeneliegh (26 letters) a ford on the boundary of Moyne parish in Tipperary; and Barrecoroughbollinbraykon (25 letters) a "littel stream" on the border of Gorey barony. A place named Caherhewlissingaberrighe (24 letters) in Galway or Roscommon is mentioned in a 1578 fiant. An 1825 index of placenames in the decrees of innocence registered under the Act of Settlement 1662 includes Gortecoleighshraghmicknuckgenny (31 letters), Ballynygorenagheyannyneaghe (27 letters) and Laghirtydonellanknockane (24 letters).

The Placenames Database of Ireland includes an entry for "Lougheroaghballaghdown" (22 letters), apparently a misspelt duplicate of "Lough Croaghballaghdown". An 1824 return of townlands in Mayo includes one of 48 acres in the parish of "Torlogh" (now Turlough), barony of Carra, named "Knockballymackellygirrenane [27 letters] Tully". This is a mistranscription of "Knockballymackelly, Grenane, and Tully[quirke]", now the townland of Greenans.

== See also ==
- Place names in Ireland
- List of long place names
- Two Irish towns with 19-letter names:
  - Newtownmountkennedy
  - Castletownbere, sometimes called Castletownberehaven
