= Kinvara (Moycullen) =

Townland in west County Galway, Ireland

Coordinates: 53.33918°N 9.55156°W

Kinvara or Kinvarra (Irish: Cinn Mhara, meaning 'head of the sea') is a townland in the civil parish of Kilcummin and barony of Moycullen in the west of County Galway, Ireland. It is on the R336 road north of the village of Casla and south of Screeb, at Irish Grid Reference L967332. As of the 2011 census, the townland had a population of 54 people.
