= R343 road =

R343 road may refer to:

- R343 road (Ireland)
- R343 road (South Africa)
