= R341 road =

R341 road may refer to:

- R341 road (Ireland)
- R341 road (South Africa)
