= Ó Méalóid =

Ó Méalóid is an Irish language surname, the English language equivalent of which is Mellett.

The name is rare in Ireland. It is found in Connemara in County Galway, where the name originated, County Mayo and around Ráth Cairn, a small Gaeltacht (Irish speaking) area in County Meath, where it is mainly concentrated now (a number of families with the name Ó Méalóid moved from Camus, County Galway to Ráth Cairn as part of a Gaeltacht relocation project carried out in Ireland in the early 1930s).

However, the name can now be found in small numbers elsewhere in Ireland, particularly Dublin.
