= R372 road =

R372 road may refer to:

- R372 road (Ireland)
- R372 road (South Africa)
