= Lettermuckoo =

Townland in County Galway, Ireland

Coordinates: 53.3193°N 9.5498°W

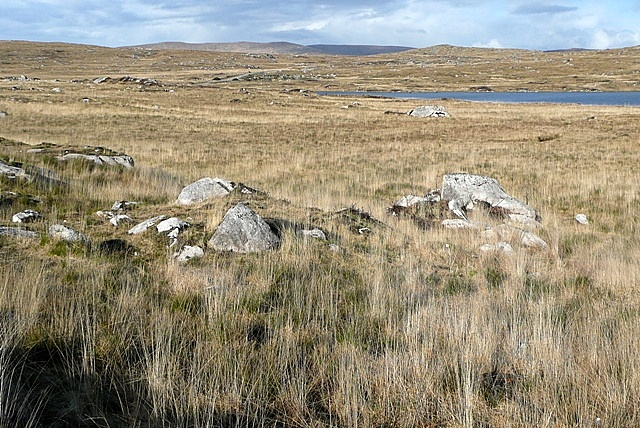
Landscape around Lettermuckoo

Lettermuckoo (Irish: Leitir Mucú) is a townland in County Galway, Ireland. It lies in an Irish-speaking (Gaeltacht) area, close to the villages of Screeb and Casla (Costelloe). The townland of Lettermuckoo has an area of approximately 10 square kilometres (3.9 mi^{2}), and had a population of 55 residents as of the 2011 census. The local national (primary) school, Scoil Naisiunta Leitir Mucú, had closed by 2021 due to a lack of students.

== Sport ==
The stallion Lettermuckoo Lad is a Connemara pony born in 2001 in Lettermuckoo. Lettermuckoo Lad won a number of showjumping competitions, and finished 3rd in the "Performance Hunter for Connemara Ponies 8-15 years" category at the 2013 Dublin Horse Show.
