= R340 road =

R340 road may refer to:

- R340 road (Ireland)
- R340 road (South Africa)
