= R337 road =

R337 road may refer to:

- R337 road (Ireland)
- R337 road (South Africa)
