= R342 road =

R342 road may refer to:

- R342 road (Ireland)
- R342 road (South Africa)
