= R343 road (Ireland) =

Road in Ireland

Coordinates: 53.264816°N 9.596794°W

R343 road
- Bóthar R343
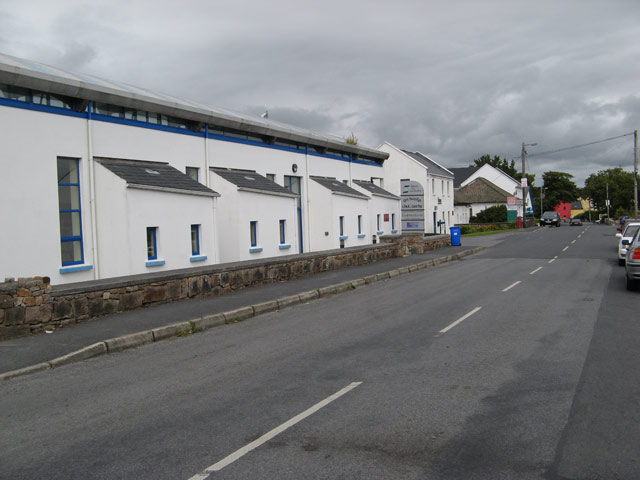
- R343 passing Carraroe Library

Route information
- Length: 4.2 km (2.6 mi)

Major junctions
- From: Carraroe
- R374 Casla
- To: R336 Casla

Location
- Country: Ireland

Highway system
- Roads in Ireland; Motorways; Primary; Secondary; Regional

The R343 road is a 4.2 km long regional road in Ireland, located in Connemara, County Galway.
