= Colm de Bhailís =

Irish poet

- Engraving of Colm de Bhailís from the book "Aṁráın Ċuılm de Ḃaılís" published by Conradh na Gaeilge in 1904.
- Born: Colm de Bhailís; 2 May 1796; Lettermullen, Connemara, Ireland
- Died: 27 February 1906 (aged 109 years, 301 days); Oughterard, Ireland
- Known for: Longevity
- Children: 1

Colm de Bhailís (2 May 1796 – 27 February 1906) was an Irish poet, songwriter, stonemason and centenarian who lived to be 109 years old.

== Biography ==
De Bhailís was from Lettermullen, Connemara. A stonemason who traveled extensively throughout Ireland, he is believed to have lived for some time in Kilrush, County Clare, and Westport, County Mayo. Amhrán a Tae and Cúirt an tSrutháin Bhuí, were the best-known of the at least seventeen poems he is known to have written. He is recorded living at the poorhouse at Cregg, Oughterard. County Galway in the British census of 1901 as simply CW, aged 105. (Wallace being the anglicised version of his surname).

Thanks to the efforts of Pádraig Pearse and Éamon de Valera he was moved from the poorhouse to lodge with the O'Toole family, Main Street, Oughterard. He lived until he was 109 years old, falling a few months shy of supercentenarian status, and was buried in Oughterard's Kilcummin Old Cemetery.

== Personal life and death ==
He was twice a widower. His second wife, Úna, died around 1900. He had a son by his first wife, Siobhán Frainc Ní Lochlainn. The boy was baptised Tomás and died in 1877, aged twenty-two.

== Bibliography ==
- Amhrán Chuilm de Bhailís (1904), ed. by J.H. Lloyd, with notices by Douglas Hyde and Pádraig Pearse.
