= Alexander Nimmo =

Scottish civil engineer and geologist

- Born: 1783; Cupar, Fife, Scotland
- Died: 20 January 1832 (Aged 49)
- Occupation: Engineer/Architect

Alexander Nimmo FRSE MRIA MICE HFGS (1783 – 20 January 1832) was a Scottish civil engineer and geologist active in early 19th-century Ireland.

== Early life ==
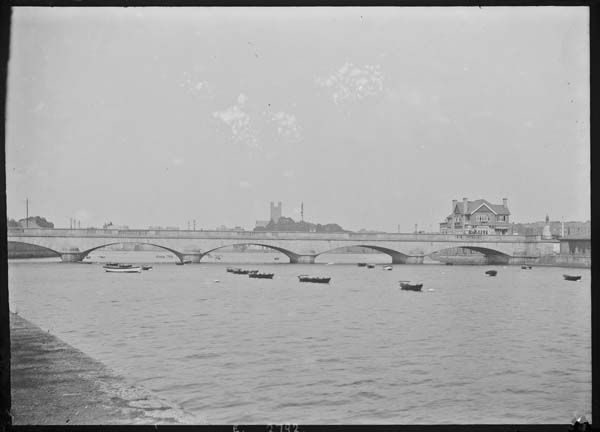
Sarsfield Bridge, Limerick

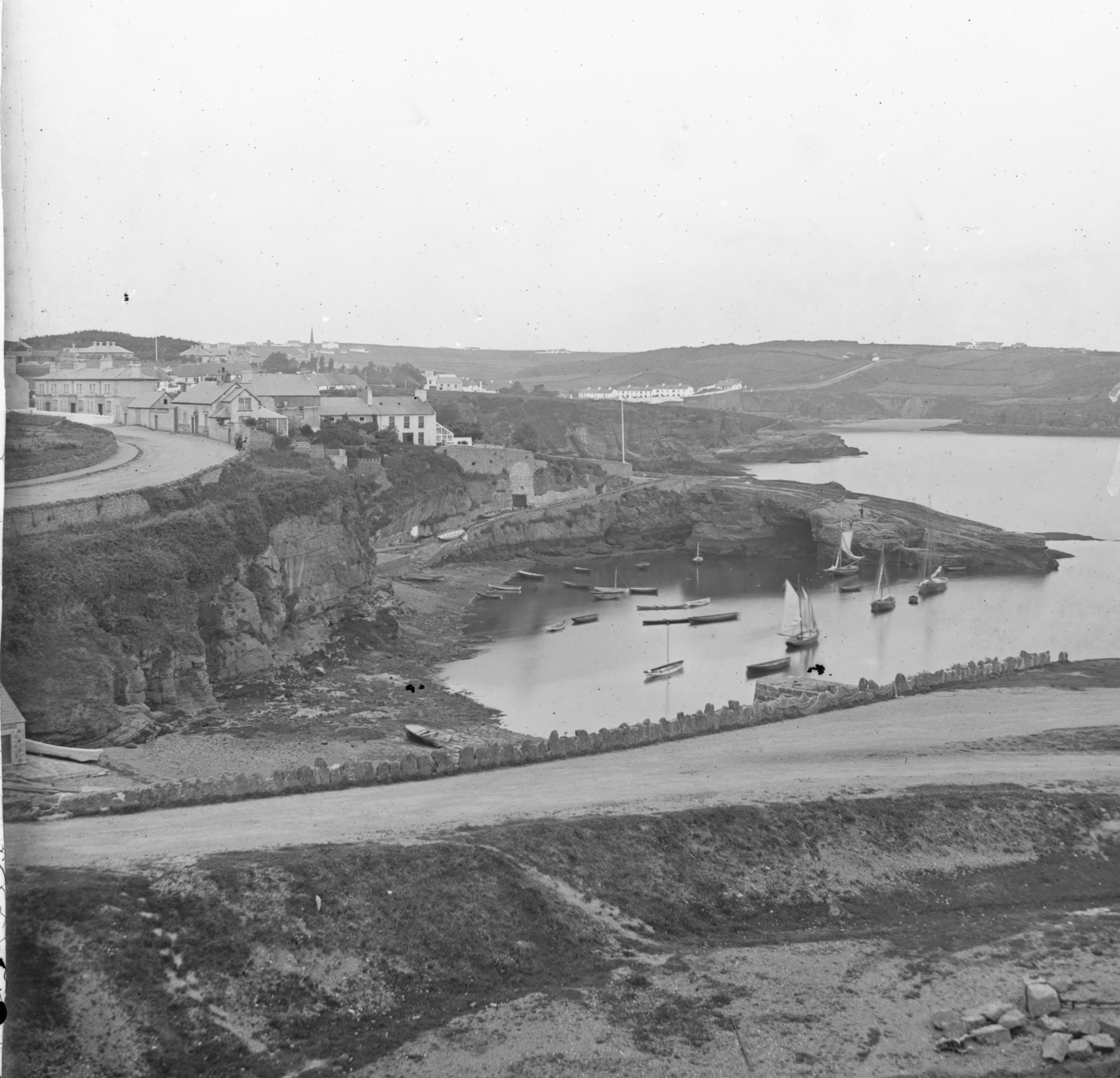
Dunmore Harbour, Waterford

Nimmo was born in Cupar, Fife in 1783, the son of a watchmaker, and grew up in Kirkcaldy. He may have been educated at Kirkcaldy Burgh School, then studied at the University of St Andrews and University of Edinburgh. His first role was as Rector of Inverness Royal Academy in 1802, aged only 19. Around 1805, he became a Commissioner for the Scottish Boundaries Commission. In 1811 he was elected a Fellow of the Royal Society of Edinburgh for his contributions to marine geology. His proposers were George Steuart Mackenzie, Alexander Christison, and Thomas Allan.

== Move to Ireland ==
From 1811, he worked in Ireland as an engineer, with his first major task being for the Commission for the Reclamation of Irish Bogs. This was apparently on the recommendation of Thomas Telford.

In 1814, when Dunmore East was still a small County Waterford fishing hamlet, it was chosen by the British Post Office to be the Irish terminal for a new Mail Packet route from Milford Haven in Wales. The Post Office procured Nimmo's services to design and build a harbour and lighthouse to accommodate the new Mail Packet Service. In building the harbour, Nimmo made use of local red sandstone, and his lighthouse took the form of a "fluted Doric column, with the lantern on top of the capital". The passenger and mail service operated between Milford and Dunmore for only ten years, before Waterford Port became the Irish terminal; obviating the 10-mile road journey from Dunmore East.

In 1815, he improved the navigation on the river at Cork and improved the adjacent harbour at Cobh. Beginning in 1820, he was employed by the Irish Fisheries Board to make extensive surveys and recommendations for Irelands fishing harbours.

== Dublin office ==
Originally, Nimmo rented an office at 56 Marlborough Street, Dublin specifically for the purposes of carrying out his work for the Western District, but this building was found to be inadequate and the lease was terminated in June 1823.

Nimmo never married, but had close ties with his brothers, John and George. At some point they arrived in Ireland to assist Alexander with his work, bringing their wives and children along with them, and would remain in Ireland for the rest of their lives. In September 1823, George Nimmo, living in Dublin, took out a 900-year lease on a property on the west side of Marlborough Street from the Reverend Mathias Kelly at the yearly rent of £91. The house number of the property was not specified in the deed, but we know it to have been number 78. A month later, he assigned the lease of this house on to his brother Alexander. This building would serve as the headquarters of the Western District works until 1832. Nimmo also personally lived at the address, and declared before a House of Lords enquiry in 1824 that he had but one property, "a house in Dublin, leasehold of nine hundred years".

Nimmo kept a permanent staff in Dublin, and also the west of Ireland. Amongst the staff employed in Dublin were an accountant and other administrative staff, along with a number of student surveyors and engineers who were regularly sent to the west for the purposes of mapping sites of potential works or road routes.

== Connemara ==
In August 1826, Thomas Martin of Ballinahinch, County Galway granted a 'three-lives lease', or 99-year lease (whichever should last longest), to Nimmo, for property in the village of Roundstone in Galway consisting of "the farm and lands of the half cartron of Letterdife commonly called The White House, together with the shores and weeds thereunto belonging and also one acre now in his (Nimmo's) actual possession bounded on the east by Roundstone Bay...". The lease was witnessed by Nimmo, who was noted as living in the town of Galway at the time (perhaps temporarily) and his profession as 'architect'. The lease was valued at the yearly rent of eighteen pounds, nine shillings and two pence, three farthings (£18.9.2d), and also specified that Nimmo could make use of the pasture on the mountain of Errisbeg in common with other tenants of Martin's.

At some point, Nimmo came into possession of almost 240 acres of land at Roundstone Bay (probably separate to the 1826 deed listed above), on which land he developed a fishing village. Nimmo later told Dublin Castle that these buildings were erected entirely at his own expense; some of the buildings being intended for his own use or the use of his staff or workforce, and others rented out to the government. The project was intended as a commercial venture for the purposes of making a profit, and it does not appear that it was Nimmo's wish to live permanently in the village. However, both John and George Nimmo appear in deeds concerning Roundstone in the years following Alexander's death, indicating a lasting family or business connection with the area.

Nimmo erected 'a lodge' at Leenaun to accommodate his workforce in that area, and in 1831, the property was given over to a tenant who converted it into 'a billeting place for travellers passing to the western coast'. In Leenaun he also built a store, office, carpentry and smithy workshops, all of which he rented to the government for three years, from June 1828 to June 1831, at the rent of £30 per annum.

Nimmo had proposed numerous sites in the west of Ireland on which viable villages could be established, concentrating the inhabitants of the rural areas into a centre where trade and industry could flourish somewhat and alleviate their poverty. Towns, he argued, helped to elevate people away from their dependency on agriculture and the land:

"Generally speaking, it strikes me we should now endeavour to congregate the surplus population of Ireland into towns, where they could be useful to each other, rather than have them so much scattered over the country. The towns in Ireland bear a very small proportion, in respect of population, to the towns in England; and the industry, in like manner, is less"

He had hoped that new villages would develop at Derryinver, Cleggan and Spiddal, but the only new villages that advanced during the 1820s were Belmullet and his own settlement at Roundstone.

== Other works ==
In 1828, Nimmo visited the Wirral Peninsula alongside Thomas Telford and Robert Stevenson for the purposes of studying the problems of the rivers Dee and Mersey, for which the three men later submitted a report.

In 1830, he was commissioned by the Knight of Kerry to design a new village on Valentia Island in County Kerry, which was later named Knightstown. His maritime engineering designs combined classical motifs with utilitarian functionality. Among other projects, he is credited with designing the road from Galway to Clifden and the harbour of Roundstone in Connemara.

In the 1830s he redesigned over 30 harbours on the western Irish coast. At Limerick, one of his major projects was the Wellesley Bridge (now known as the Sarsfield Bridge) which was constructed between 1824 and 1835.

== Death ==
Nimmo died at his Dublin home, 78 Marlborough Street, on the evening of 20 January 1832, aged 49. According to The Times, he had been for some time an invalid as a result of rheumatic pains, and had ultimately died from "dropsy". The Galway Weekly Advertiser, a week after his death, marked his passing with the following eulogy:

"Alexander Nimmo, Esq., F.R.S.E, M.R.I.A., Etc., Etc., The honorary distinctions are but as dust weighted in the balance when compared with the sterling talent and [intrinsic] merit of this excellent and lamented individual. Eulogism is unnecessary, as the word 'Ireland' alone will be both his most merited monument and suitable epitaph. No man so well understood the remedies required for its practical evils, and the effects will be felt long after the very remembrance of his name will have passed away. As a theorist and scientific member of his profession he has left 'no equal', and in conclusion it may safely be said, "the British Empire in general has sustained an almost irreparable loss""

== Select works ==
- Poulaphouca Bridge, linking County Wicklow and County Kildare

== Publications ==
- Boscovitch's Theory (1812)
- Navigation Inland (1821)
- On the Application of the Science of Geology to the purposes of Practical Navigation (1823)
