= R374 road =

R374 road may refer to:

- R374 road (Ireland)
- R374 road (South Africa)
