= R338 road =

R338 road may refer to:

- R338 road (Ireland)
- R338 road (South Africa)
