= Killagoola =

Townland in County Galway, Ireland

Coordinates: 53°19′N 9°11′W

Killagoola (Irish: Cill Ogúla) is a small townland in the civil parish of Moycullen in County Galway, Ireland. It is located about 8 miles from Galway city, just off the N59 Galway–Clifden road. Its name is derived from the Irish name of Cill Ogúla, which means 'church on the shoulder' (of a hill). Indeed there is the ruins of a small church within the boundaries of Killagoola, on the largest site in the area, Crú Hill.

Until the first half of the 20th century, Irish was the language used in the area, but usage diminished in the latter half of the century, towards English.

Killagoola has locally derived place-names such as Mountview, Sruthan, Sceith and Baile Thiar to distinguish areas of the townland. The Lough Kip river runs from the lake, Lough Kip, through the townland towards Ballyquirke Lake, a feeder for the much larger Lough Corrib. Most of the land in the area is used as farmland, reclaimed from boggy or mountainous areas.

Some of the families living in the area have lived there for generations and their names can be viewed on land deeds from the 19th century. After a drop in the townland population from the 1960s to the 1980s, an influx of people in the 1990s, due to its proximity to Galway city, has bolstered the small population.
