= R338 road (Ireland) =

Road in Ireland

Coordinates: 53.274443°N 9.079381°W

R338 road
- Bóthar R338
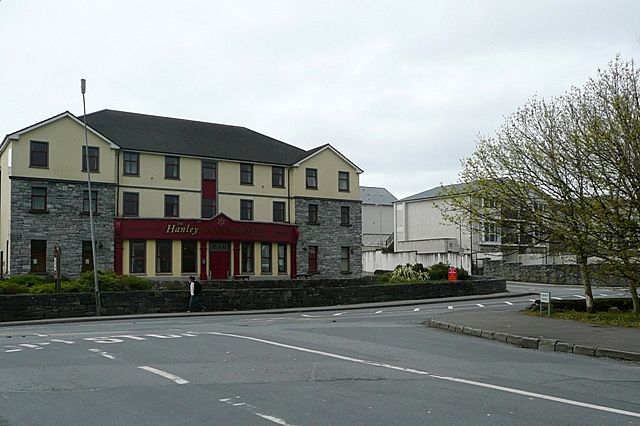
- R338 passing the Hanley Oaks Hotel, Galway

Route information
- Length: 11.9 km (7.4 mi)

Major junctions
- From: R336 Salthill (Prom)
- R337 Salthill; N6 Galway (Browne Roundabout); R336 Galway (Cemetery Cross); R866 Galway (Headford Road); R336 Galway; R339 Galway (Wellpark Road); R865 Galway (GMIT Roundabout); R921 Galway
- To: N67 Oranmore

Location
- Country: Ireland

Highway system
- Roads in Ireland; Motorways; Primary; Secondary; Regional

The R338 road is a regional road in Ireland, located in southern County Galway.
