= Ballycuirke Lough =

Lake near Galway city, Ireland

- Loch Bhaile Uí Chuirc (Irish)
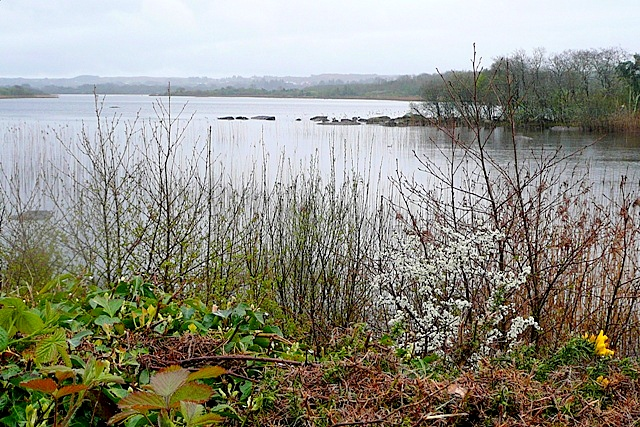

- Location in Ireland
- Location: County Galway
- Coordinates: 53°19′39″N 9°9′28″W
- Primary inflows: Loughkip River
- Catchment area: 33.45 km^{2} (12.9 sq mi)
- Basin countries: Ireland
- Max. length: 1.8 km (1.1 mi)
- Max. width: 0.7 km (0.4 mi)
- Surface area: 0.74 km^{2} (0.29 sq mi)
- Surface elevation: 6 m (20 ft)
- Islands: 3

Ballycuirke Lough (Irish: Loch Bhaile Uí Chuirc), also known as Ballyquirke Lough, is a freshwater lake in the west of Ireland. It is part of the Lough Corrib catchment in County Galway.

== Geography and natural history ==
Ballycuirke Lough is located about 11 km (7 mi) northwest of Galway city, on the N59 road, near the village of Moycullen. The lake is a pike fishing destination.

== See also ==
- List of loughs in Ireland
