= Diarmuid Ó Gráinne =

- Born: 10 May 1950; Aill an Phréacháin, Na Forbacha, County Galway, Ireland
- Died: 28 August 2013 (aged 63); Renmore, Galway, County Galway, Ireland
- Occupations: Writer, journalist, farmer, teacher
- Spouse: Caitlín Ní Shíthigh
- Writing career
- Genres: Fiction, poetry, philosophy, criticism, translation
- Subject: modern Irish prose
- Notable works: An Traimp, Muintir na Coille

Diarmuid Ó Gráinne (10 May 1950 – 28 August 2013) was an Irish-language writer and journalist from the County Galway Gaeltacht. He wrote for the newspaper, Lá and featured on Raidió na Gaeltachta. He released a number of books, perhaps best known works are his semi-autobiographical novel writings An Traimp and Muintir na Coille.

Ó Gráinne was strongly influenced by his fellow Connemara-man, Máirtín Ó Cadhain whose death he felt left a hole in the leadership of the Irish-language movement. Ó Gráinne also became interested in some Continental European authors, translating writings by or autobiographies about Karl Marx, Albert Camus and Friedrich Nietzsche into Irish.

== Bibliography ==
=== Criticism ===
- An Dá Mháirtín (Comhar: 1990)

=== Novels ===
- An Traimp (Cló Iar-Chonnacht: 1991)
- Brionglóidí briste (An Clóchomhar Teoranta: 1991)
- Cloch Scoiltí (Coiscéim: 2002)
- An Drochshúil (Coiscéim: 2002)
- Muintir na Coille (Coiscéim: 2011)

=== Poetry ===
- Spéir thoirní (Coiscéim: 1993)
- Spealadh an drúchta (Coiscéim: 1995)
- Coill chríon na bhForbacha (Coiscéim: 2001)

=== Short-stories ===
- Céard a dhéanfas tú anois? (Coiscéim: 1997)

=== Philosophy ===
- Ó Rinn go Sáil, I (Coiscéim: 2010)
- Ó Rinn go Sáil, II (Coiscéim: 2012)
- Ó Rinn go Sáil, III (Coiscéim: 2013)

=== Miscellaneous ===
- Karl Marx (Coiscéim: 1993) translation of Caroline Seaward
- A scéal féin – Máire Phatch Mhóir Uí Churraoin (Coiscéim: 1995)
- Peait Phádraic Tom Ó Conghaile – A scéal féin (Coiscéim: 1997)
- Friedrich Nietzsche: Saol agus smaointeachas (Coiscéim: 1997)
- Doirse éalaithe (Coiscéim: 2004)
- Fágann marbh láthair (Coiscéim: 2006)
- An dorn iata (Coiscéim: 2007)
- Cúba agus Castró (Coiscéim: 2009)
- An Strainséara (Coiscéim: 2012) translation of L’Étranger by Albert Camus
