= Kilkieran =

Coastal village in County Galway, Ireland

Cill Chiaráin Kilkieran
- Village
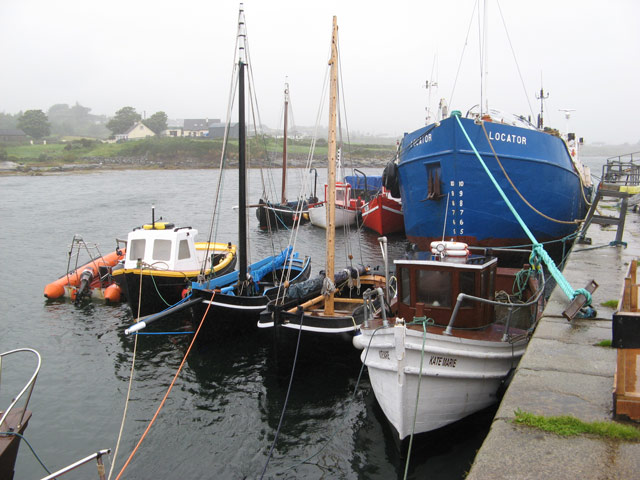
- Boats in Kilkieran

- Location in Ireland
- Coordinates: 53°19′33″N 9°44′07″W
- Country: Ireland
- Province: Connacht
- County: County Galway
- Elevation: 0 m (0 ft)
- Irish Grid Reference: L844319
- Cill Chiaráin is the only official name. The anglicized spelling Kilkieran has no official status.

Cill Chiaráin (anglicized as Kilkieran) is a coastal village in the Connemara area of County Galway in Ireland. The R340 passes through Cill Chiaráin.

Cill Chiaráin lies in a Gaeltacht region (Irish-speaking area), and Coláiste Sheosaimh hosts Irish language courses within the village.

== Name ==
The village is named after Saint Ciarán, "Cill Chiaráin" translates to "Ciarán's church" from Irish. It shares its name with a second Cill Chiaráin in County Kilkenny.

== History ==
On St Ciarán's feast day, there is a Pattern Day in honour of the saint held in the village. Organised by the local festival committee, Coiste Fhéile Chill Chiaráin, there is a Roman Catholic Mass performed at the well which St Ciarán blessed back in the 6th century.

== Amenities ==
Cill Chiaráin has a number of facilities and public buildings, including a health centre, a "gastropub" (Tigh Chadhain), local supermarket, a national school, community hall, church and fish factory.

The Arramara Teo seaweed factory is also nearby. The company was previously Irish owned, but has since been bought by a Canadian company.

The village also has a children's playground and the Páirc Peile Chill Chiaráin (artificial pitch) which opened in 2015. The pitch is used by the local GAA team, Carna-Cashel, and the athletics club.

== See also ==
- List of towns and villages in Ireland
