= Moycullen (civil parish) =

Civil parish near Galway city, Ireland

- Civil parish
- Maigh Cuilinn
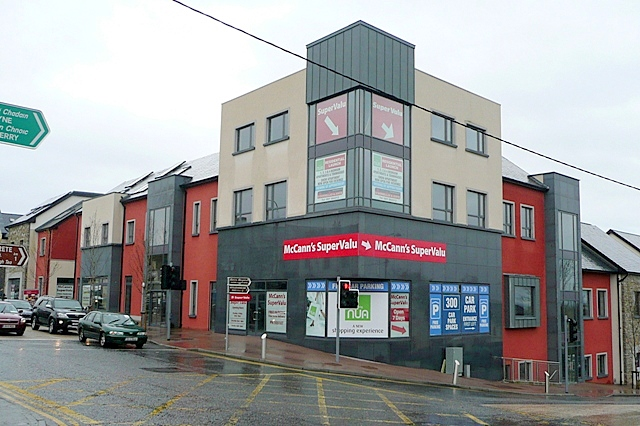
- Moycullen village centre

- Location in Ireland
- Coordinates: 53.342273°N 9.156753°W
- Country: Ireland
- Province: Connacht
- County: County Galway
- Irish Grid Reference: M130225

Moycullen (Irish: Maigh Cuilinn) is a Gaeltacht civil parish in the ancient barony of the same name. It is located in the western shore of Lough Corrib in County Galway, Ireland and is around 4 miles (6.4 km) north-west of the city of Galway on the road to Oughterard. The parish contains 27,294 statute acres. (Note: "A topographical dictionary of Ireland" - Samuel Lewis, 1837.) According to Lewis's survey of 1837, (Note: "A topographical dictionary of Ireland" - Samuel Lewis, 1837.) "The land is of very indifferent quality; and there is a large quantity of reclaimable waste and bog.". The parish gets its name from the church, now in ruins, that is situated around 1 mile (1.6 km) to the east of the village, in the townland of Moycullen itself. (Note: Galway Library - Moycullen church (ruins).)

Settlements in the parish include the village of the same name and the village of Spiddal.

== Townlands ==
There are 76 townlands in the parish. (Note: Galway Community Heritage - Moycullen)

| Name in English | Name in Irish |
|---|---|
| Addragool | Eadargúil |
| Aubwee | An tÁth Buí |
| Ballycuirke East | Baile Uí Chuirc Thoir |
| Ballycuirke West | Baile Uí Chuirc Thiar |
| Ballydotia | Baile Dóite |
| Ballynahallia | Baile na hAille |
| Caoch | Caoch |
| Carrowlustraun | Ceathrú an Loistreáin |
| Cartoor | An Cartúr |
| Cloonabinna | Cluain na Binne |
| Clooniffe | Cluain Duibh |
| Clydagh | Claídeach |
| Coolaghy | Na Cualacha |
| Corbally | An Corrbhaile |
| Corcullen | Corr Chuilinn |
| Curra | An Chora |
| Currawatia | An Chora Bháite |
| Dovepark | Páirc na gColm |
| Deerfield | Gort na fianna |
| Drimcong | Droim Chonga |
| Drimmavohaun | Droim an Mhúchain |
| Drimneen | Droimnín |
| Drumaveg | Droma Bheag |
| Finisklin | Fionasclainn |
| Gortachalla | Gort an Chalaidh |
| Gortaghokera | Gort an Chóchraí |
| Gortnamona East | Gort na Móna Thoir |
| Gortnamona West | Gort na Móna Thiar |
| Gortnavea/Deerfield | Gort na bhFia |
| Gortyloughlin/Danesfield | Gort Uí Lochlainn |
| Homefarm | An Fheirm |
| Keeagh | An Chaothach |
| Kilcloggaun | Cill Chlogáin |
| Killagoola | Cill Ogúla |
| Kilrainey | Cill Ráine |
| Knock | An Cnoc |
| Knockalough | Cnoc an Locha |
| Knockaunranny | Cnocán Raithní |
| Knockerasser | Cnoc ar Easair |
| Knockshanbally | Cnoc an tSeanbhaile |
| Kylebroughlan | Coill Bhruachláin |
| Laughil | Leamhchoill |
| Leagaun | Liagán |
| Lealetter | Liathleitir |
| Lissagurraun | Lios an Gharráin |
| Loughwell | Leamhchoill |
| Newtown | An Bhaile Nua |
| Oghery | Eochaire |
| Oldtown | An Sean Bhaile |
| Pollnaclogha | Poll na Cloiche |
| Polleha | Poille |
| Pollagh | An Pollach |
| Portdarragh/Portarra | Port Darach |
| Rineen | An Rinnín |
| Slieveaneena | Sliabh an Aonaigh |
| Tawnybeg | Na Tamhnacha Beaga |
| Tooreeny | Na Tuairíní |
| Truskaunnagappal | Troscaigh na gCapall |
| Tullaghnanoon | Tulaigh na nUan |
| Tullokyne | Tulach Uí Chadhaoin |
| Tumnasrah | Tom na Sraithe |
| Uggool | Ogúil |

== Catholic parish ==
The Catholic parish of Moycullen, which is part of the Roman Catholic Diocese of Galway, Kilmacduagh and Kilfenora, (Note: Galway Diocese - Catholic parish) is roughly co-extensive with the civil parish. The main parish church, the Church of the Immaculate Conception, is located in Moycullen village. (Note: Catholic parish - Immaculate Conception.)

== Notable people ==
- Ruaidhrí Ó Flaithbheartaigh (Roderic O'Flaherty), historian and antiquary, was born in Moycullen Castle in 1630. (Note: Library Ireland - Roderic O'Flaherty.)
- (Lady Morgan) Sydney Owenson (1783 - 1859), whose 1827 novel "The O'Briens and the O'Flahertys: A National Tale", (Note: "The O'Briens and the O'Flahertys: A National Tale" - Lady Morgan, 1827.) is set in the barony and mentions the túath of the O'Flaherty dynasty.
