= R337 road (Ireland) =

Road in Ireland

Coordinates: 53.267123°N 9.087303°W

R337 road
- Bóthar R337

Route information
- Length: 3.5 km (2.2 mi)

Major junctions
- From: R336 Galway (Barna Road)
- R338 Galway (Bishop O'Donnell Road); R864 Galway (St. Mary's Road)
- To: R336 Galway (Father Griffin Road)

Location
- Country: Ireland

Highway system
- Roads in Ireland; Motorways; Primary; Secondary; Regional

The R337 road is a short regional road in Ireland, located in Galway city.
