= Lettermullen =

Island and village in County Galway, Ireland

Lettermullen Leitir Mealláin
- Village
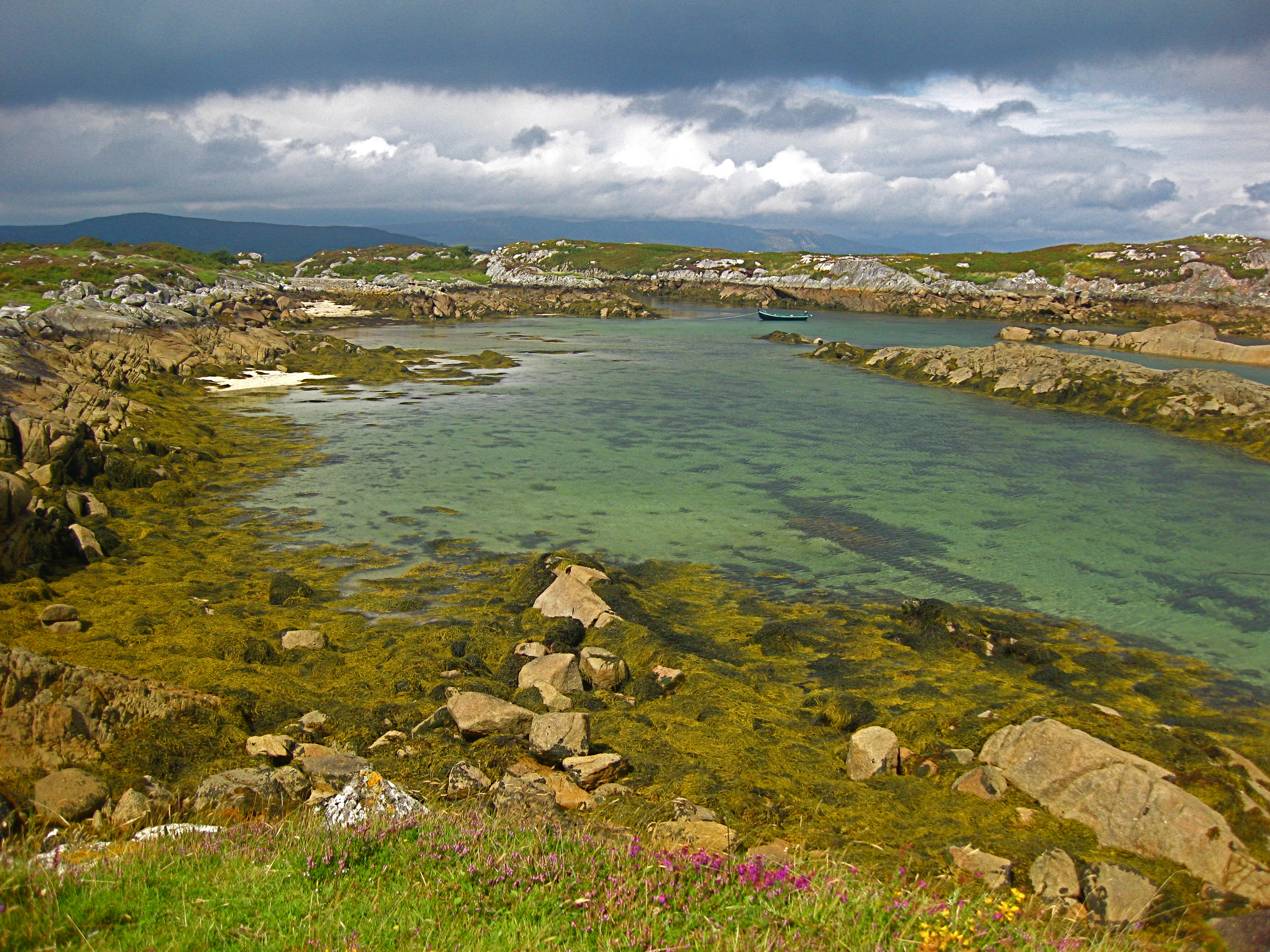

- Location in Ireland
- Coordinates: 53°14′38″N 9°43′34″W
- Country: Ireland
- Province: Connacht
- County: County Galway

Population (2022)
  - Total: 214
- Irish Grid Reference: L848522

Lettermullen (Irish: Leitir Mealláin, meaning 'Mealláin's rough hillside' or possibly "the hill with the mill") is a small island and village on the coast of southern Connemara in County Galway, Ireland. It is about 58 km (36 mi) west of Galway city, at the far western end of Galway Bay, Lettermullen is the westernmost of three islands; Lettermullen, Gorumna and Lettermore, along with smaller islands collectively known as Ceantar na nOileán ("District of the Islands") connected to the mainland by the bridges and causeways of the R374 road.

== Geography and geology ==
Lettermullen is in the parish of Kilcummin, barony of Moycullen, and province of Connacht. It forms one side of Kiegall Bay, and its northern end is part of the shore of Casheen Bay. The island comprises about 100 hectares (250 acres) of arable and pasture land. The inhabitants are chiefly employed in herring and cod fisheries and in the collection of seaweed for manure. Lettermullen is connected to the islands of Dinish (Irish: Daighinis), Furnish (Irish: Foirinis), Inisherk (Irish: Inis Eirc), and Crappagh (Irish: An Cnapach).

The northern third of Lettermullan is composed of the same intrusive Devonian-aged granite underlying most of Galway that formed from crustal melting as a result of the Caledonian Orogeny in the late Silurian. The remainder of the island is made up of Ordovician-aged bedrock of sedimentary marine rocks and basalt.

== Culture ==
Lettermullen is part of the Gaeltacht (Irish-speaking region of Ireland) and Irish is the most common spoken language. Accordingly, its official name is Leitir Mealláin. The orbiting islands of Crappagh (Irish: An Cnapach) and Furnish (Irish: Foirinis) are particularly pure areas regarding usage of the Irish language, as all residents are native speakers.

== Landmarks ==
A very well preserved Signal Station is situated near Golam Head. These stations were built all along the Irish coast by the British from 1804 to 1806 to monitor for maritime invasions.

A picturesque cemetery, Reilig Duigill, lies just south of the R374 road immediately after crossing the bridge from Gorumna. Down the road, the central village houses a national school (Scoil Náisiúnta Leitir Mealláin), the island's only church (Séipéal Réalt na Mara), the Lettermullen Heritage Centre (Ionad Oidhreachta Leitir Mealláin), and a summer college, as well as a small café, called Caifé na Feamainne (The Seaweed Café).

== Demographics ==
Historical population

Year	Pop.	±%
1841	587	—
1851	383	−34.8%
1861	433	+13.1%
1871	497	+14.8%
1881	626	+26.0%
1891	549	−12.3%
1901	533	−2.9%
1911	460	−13.7%
1926	346	−24.8%

Year	Pop.	±%
1936	335	−3.2%
1946	329	−1.8%
1951	320	−2.7%
1956	315	−1.6%
1961	280	−11.1%
1966	245	−12.5%
1971	221	−9.8%
1979	216	−2.3%
1981	218	+0.9%

Year	Pop.	±%
1986	211	−3.2%
1991	196	−7.1%
1996	204	+4.1%
2002	219	+7.4%
2006	213	−2.7%
2011	241	+13.1%
2016	204	−15.4%
2022	214	+4.9%

Source: Central Statistics Office. "CNA17: Population by Off Shore Island, Sex and Year". CSO.ie.

== Notable people ==
The Ethnography of Garumna and Lettermullen in the County Galway; 1899

- Antoine Ó Flatharta (playwright and scriptwriter)
