= John Henry Blake =

Irish land agent

John Henry Blake (1808 – 29 June 1882) was a murdered Irish land agent.

== Biography ==
John Henry Blake was the third and youngest son of Lieutenant-Colonel John Blake of Furbo, County Galway and Maria Galway of Cork. He was a member of one of The Tribes of Galway. He worked firstly as a bailiff on the Blake estate at Furbo, but in the late 1830s moved to Kiltullagh, Athenry, to act as his infant nephew's land agent. He lived at Rathville House, Raford, in the parish of Kiltullagh.

In later life, Blake was an agent to Hubert de Burgh-Canning, 2nd Marquess of Clanricarde. Clanricarde was commonly held to be the worst landlord in all Ireland, and infamous for his evicting of tenants. However, he lived in London so it was easier to target Blake. Both Blake and his driver, Thady Ruane, were shot on the way to attend mass in Loughrea. Blake's wife, who was present, survived the incident. Despite several months of investigation and seven arrests on suspicion, no one stood trial for the murders.

The incident occurred during the height of the Land War and was one of a series of deaths and aggravations that occurred at this time in the county. It was especially shocking as it was the assassination of an agent of a peer of the realm.

He was survived by his wife Harriet (died 1917) and their sons Edmond (1876–1944) and Henry. He was buried in the family tomb at Furbo.

== See also ==
- List of unsolved murders
- Martin O'Halloran

== Books ==
- The Land War in South East Galway (1879–1891), a thesis by Anne Finnegan
- The Woodford Evictions, a thesis by Thomas Feeney
- A Forgotten Campaign, ed. Michael Shiel and Desmond Roache, n.d.
- Clanricarde Country, Woodford Heritage Group, Woodford, n.d.
- Maamtrasna - The Murders and the Mystery, Jarlath Waldron, de Burca, Dublin, 1992
- Daly of Raford, James N. Dillon, in Kiltullagh/Killimorday - As The Centuries Passed:A History from 1500-1900, ed. Kieran Jordan, 2000. ISBN 0-9538684-0-0
- Blakes of Rathville House, James N. Dillon, in op. cit.
- The Land Wars, Kevin and Kieran Jordan, in op.cit.
- John Henry Black - Victim or Villain?, Catherine Kelly Desmond, in op. cit.
