= Inishnee =

Island off Galway coast in Ireland

Native name: Inis Ní
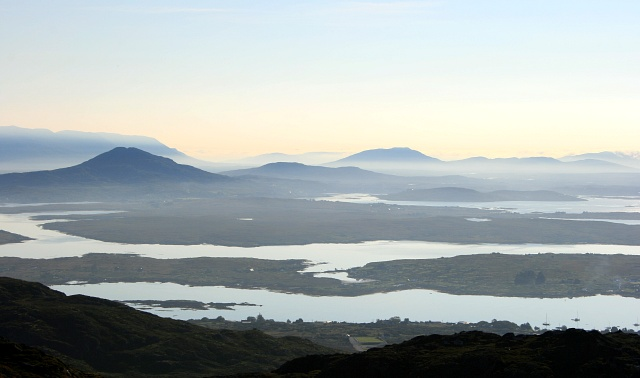
- Inishnee from Errisbeg

- Location within island of Ireland

Geography
- Location: Atlantic Ocean (Roundstone Bay)
- Coordinates: 53.399°N 9.897°W

Administration
- Ireland
- Province: Connacht
- County: Galway

Demographics
- Population: 49 (2022)

Inishnee (Irish: Inis Ní) is a small, thin island off the coast of Ireland, in Roundstone Bay near the village of Roundstone in Connemara in County Galway. It is equipped with a lighthouse. As of 2022, it had a population of 49. The island is a part of the Gaeltacht, and is within the region of Conamara Theas.

== Demographics ==
The table below shows data on Inishnee's population taken from Discover the Islands of Ireland (Alex Ritsema, Collins Press, 1999) and the Census of Ireland.

Historical population

Year	Pop.	±%
1841	455	—
1851	21	−95.4%
1861	300	+1328.6%
1871	409	+36.3%
1881	387	−5.4%
1891	324	−16.3%
1901	323	−0.3%
1911	271	−16.1%
1926	174	−35.8%

Year	Pop.	±%
1936	161	−7.5%
1946	168	+4.3%
1951	145	−13.7%
1956	141	−2.8%
1961	116	−17.7%
1966	100	−13.8%
1971	79	−21.0%
1979	83	+5.1%
1981	86	+3.6%

Year	Pop.	±%
1986	74	−14.0%
1991	47	−36.5%
1996	33	−29.8%
2002	24	−27.3%
2006	28	+16.7%
2011	43	+53.6%
2016	43	+0.0%
2022	49	+14.0%

Source: Central Statistics Office. "CNA17: Population by Off Shore Island, Sex and Year". CSO.ie.
