= R340 road (Ireland) =

Road in Ireland

Coordinates: 53.404582°N 9.783491°W

R340 road
- Bóthar R340
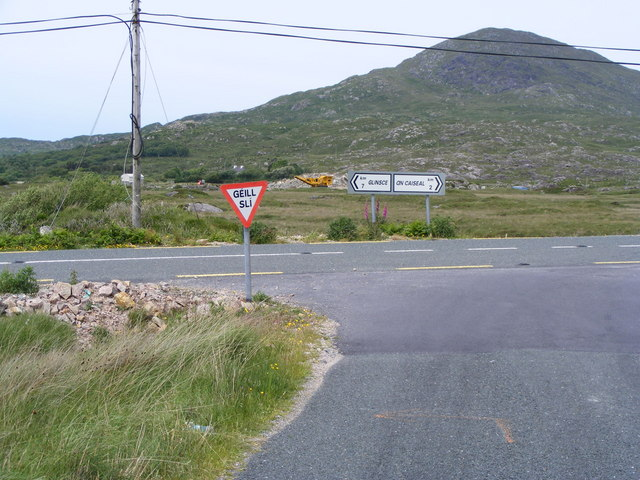
- Junction of a minor road with the R340 in Lehanagh South (Leitheanach Theas)

Route information
- Length: 43.8 km (27.2 mi)

Major junctions
- From: N59 Garroman (west of Recess)
- Crosses Lough Nacoogarrow; R342 Lehanagh; Crosses Owengowla River; Passes through Carna and Kilkieran
- To: R336 Screeb

Location
- Country: Ireland

Highway system
- Roads in Ireland; Motorways; Primary; Secondary; Regional

The R340 road is a regional road in Ireland, located in County Galway.
