= Sruffaunoughterluggatoora =

Stream in County Galway, Ireland

Coordinates: 53.5022°N 9.8122°W

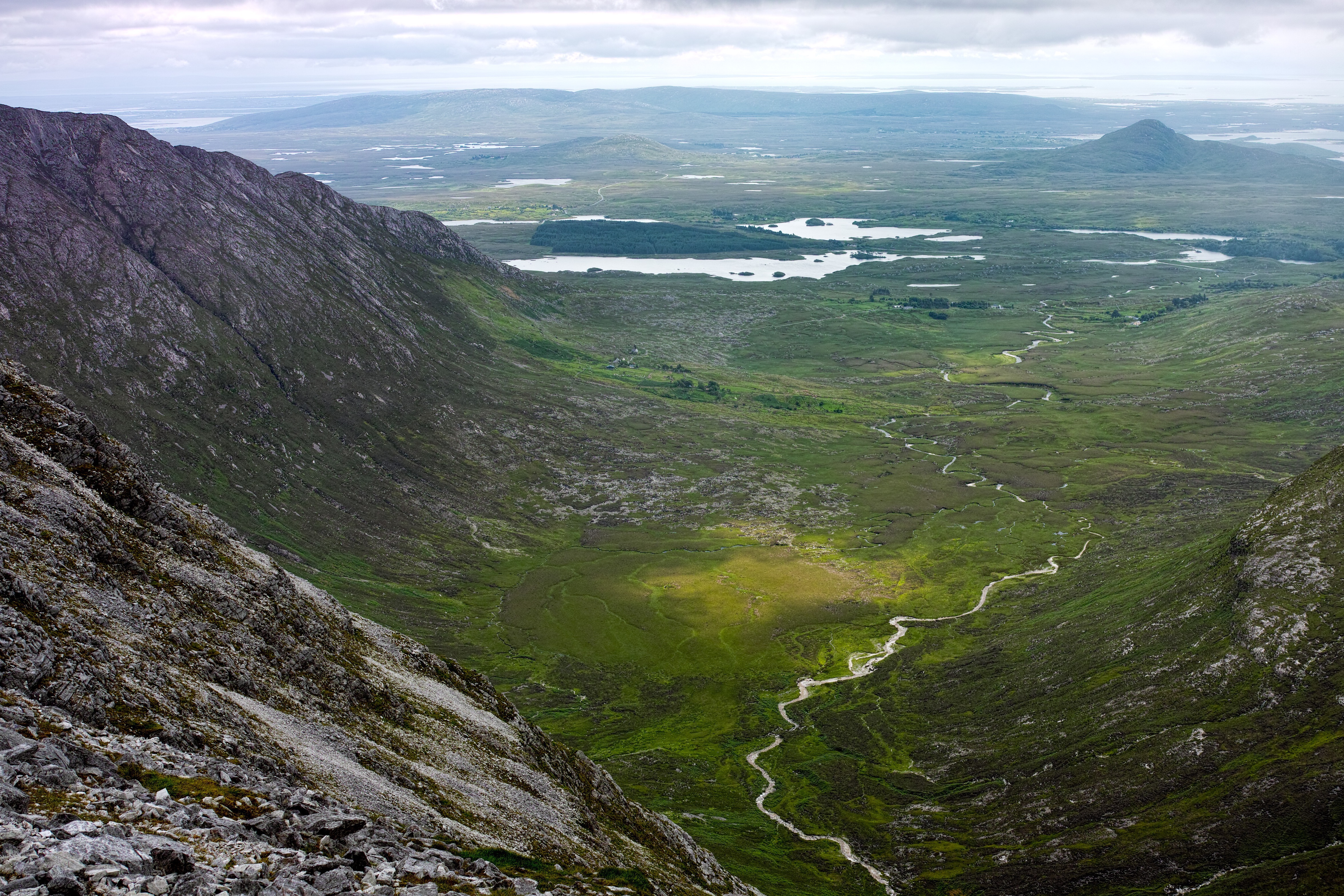
- Aerial view of the Glencoaghan River

Location
- County: County Galway
- Country: Ireland

The Sruffaunoughterluggatoora (Irish: Sruthán Uachtar Log an tSamhraidh, "upper stream of the summer hollow") is a mountain stream in the Twelve Bens of Connemara in County Galway, Ireland. It lies entirely within the townland of Glencoaghan and is a headwater of the Glencoaghan River, which it joins via the Sruffaunluggatoora. The stream is noted for its exceptionally long name, which, with 25 letters, is one of the longest place-names in Ireland.
