= Errisbeg =

Mountain in western Ireland

- Iorras Beag
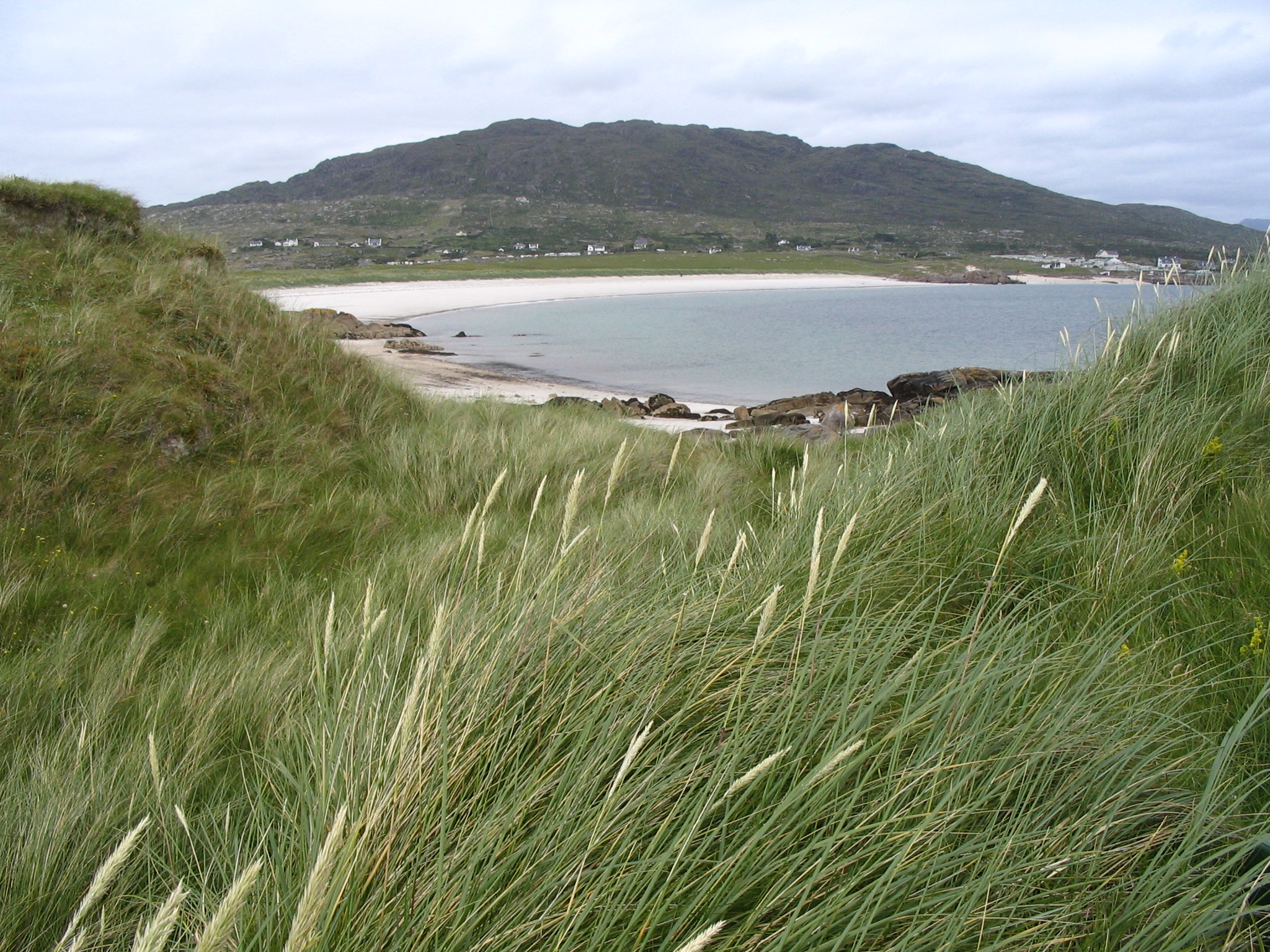
- A view of Errisbeg from Gurteen Bay.

Highest point
- Elevation: 300 m (980 ft)
- Prominence: 300 m (980 ft)
- Listing: Marilyn
- Coordinates: 53°24′0″N 9°57′0″W

Naming
- Native name: Ioras Beag (Irish)

Geography
- Location within Ireland
- Location: Roundstone, Connemara
- OSI/OSNI grid: L697401
- Topo map: OSi Discovery 44

Errisbeg Mountain or Errisbeg (Irish: Iorras Beag) is a hill in Roundstone, County Galway, in the West of Ireland, with a height of 300 m. The mountain is located within the Gaeltacht of Conamara Theas, alongside nearby Inishnee.

The summit has views of both the Roundstone bog and the Atlantic. On a clear day the Aran Islands are visible to the south and Clifden and the Twelve Bens to the North.
