= Dinish Island =

Island in County Galway, Ireland

Native name: Daighinis
- Location within island of Ireland

Geography
- Location: Atlantic Ocean
- Coordinates: 53.262°N 9.754°W
- Area: 0,182,109 km^{2} (70,313 sq mi)
- Highest elevation: 40 m (130 ft)

Administration
- Ireland
- Province: Connacht
- County: Galway

Demographics
- Population: 0 (2006)

Dinish, (Irish: Daighinis), is a small island on the coast of Connemara in County Galway, Ireland.

== Geography ==
The island is connected to the island of Lettermullen and is part of a group of islands collectively known as Ceantar na nOileán. The island has no permanent population and is not connected via a bridge, however access is possible via boat or on foot at low tide.

== History ==
The island has had a permanent population in recent history with a population of nine families in 1911.

Dinish is mentioned in the essay "In Connemara" by John Millington Synge.

It was owned in the 1950s and 1960s by Dr Alfred Thompson Schofield, surgeon and author of "Scientific Diets for African Children" (1936) and a prominent missionary for the Church Missionary Society (Uganda).

Historical population

Year	Pop.	±%
1841	59	—
1851	60	+1.7%
1861	75	+25.0%
1871	64	−14.7%
1881	74	+15.6%
1891	50	−32.4%
1901	56	+12.0%
1911	52	−7.1%

Year	Pop.	±%
1926	25	−51.9%
1936	27	+8.0%
1946	43	+59.3%
1951	35	−18.6%
1956	29	−17.1%
1961	19	−34.5%
1966	14	−26.3%
1971	12	−14.3%

Year	Pop.	±%
1979	3	−75.0%
1981	3	+0.0%
1986	1	−66.7%
1991	0	−100.0%
1996	0	0.00%
2002	0	0.00%
2006	0	0.00%

Source: Central Statistics Office. "CNA17: Population by Off Shore Island, Sex and Year". CSO.ie.
