= Lissagurraun =

Townland in County Galway, Ireland

Coordinates: 53°17′50″N 9°09′30″W

Lios an Gharráin (anglicised Lissagurraun) is a townland in the civil parish of Moycullen and north of Barna in County Galway, Ireland. There are only 10 houses and roughly 24 inhabitants in the townland, which contains no shops or schools. There is one horse riding school, the Moycullen Riding Centre. It is close to the Moycullen Bogs.
