= R341 road (Ireland) =

Road in Ireland

R341 road
- Bóthar R341
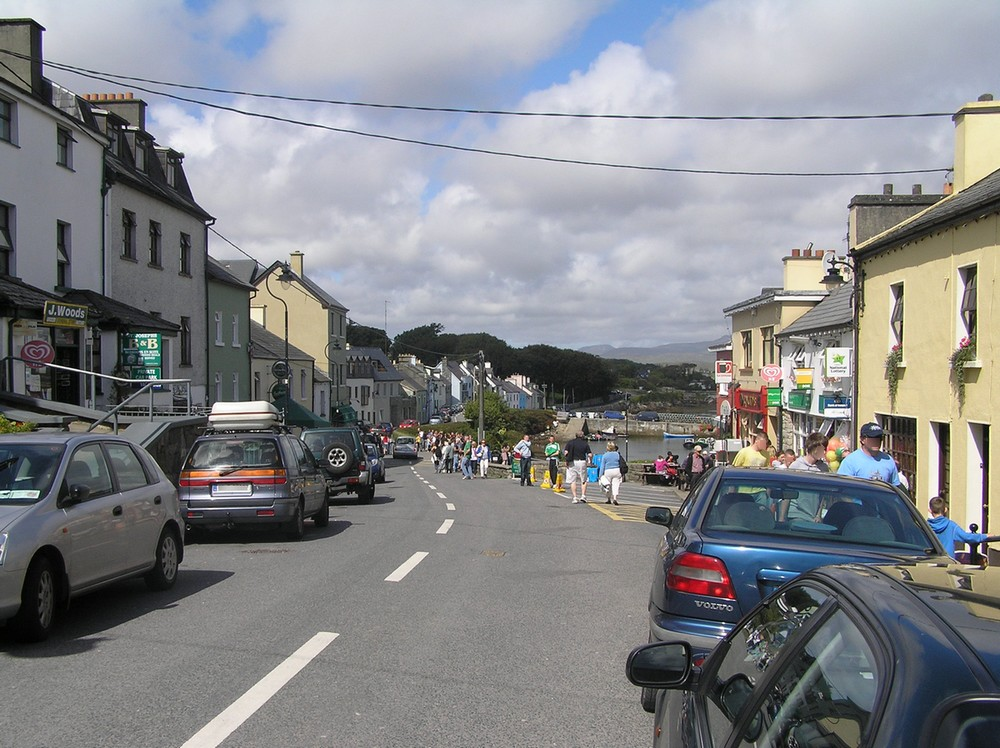
- R341 in Roundstone, County Galway

Route information
- Length: 37.7 km (23.4 mi)

Major junctions
- From: N59 at Ballinafad, County Galway
- R342 at Derryadd West (Irish: Doire Fhada Thiar)
- To: N59 at Main Street, Clifden

Location
- Country: Ireland
- Primary destinations: Roundstone; Ballyconneely; Clifden

Highway system
- Roads in Ireland; Motorways; Primary; Secondary; Regional

The R341 road is a regional road in Ireland. It is a loop road from the N59 road in County Galway. South of the R342, the road is part of the Wild Atlantic Way.

== Route ==
The R341 travels south from the N59 passing Ballynahinch Castle and through the village of Roundstone. The road then travels west past Maumeen Lough before heading north to Ballyconneely. Finally the road reaches Clifden where it rejoins the N59. The R341 is 37.7 km (23.4 mi) long. The inland side of the road is largely occupied by the Connemara Bog Complex Special Area of Conservation.

== History ==
There are two significant historical sites by the R341. About 5 km (3 mi) south of Clifden, a memorial marks the place where the transatlantic flight of Alcock and Brown landed. Further along the road, near Ballyconneely, is the site where Guglielmo Marconi established the first transatlantic telegraph service.

== See also ==
- Roads in Ireland
