= R372 road (Ireland) =

Regional road in Ireland

Coordinates: 53.273824°N 9.538879°W

R372 road
- Bóthar R372
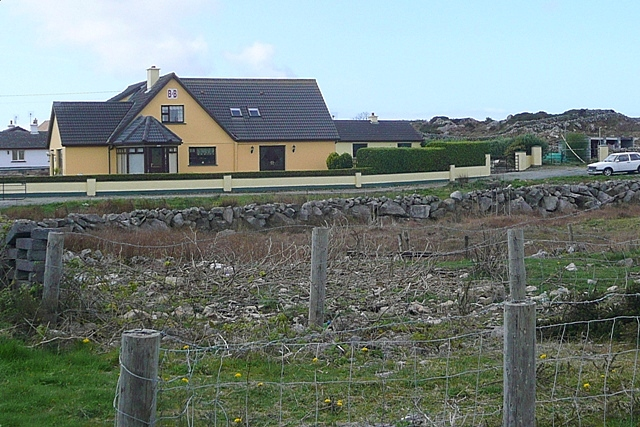
- R372 passing through Rossaveel

Route information
- Length: 2.5 km (1.6 mi)

Major junctions
- From: Rossaveel New Quay
- To: R336 Derroogh South

Location
- Country: Ireland

Highway system
- Roads in Ireland; Motorways; Primary; Secondary; Regional

The R372 road is a short regional road in Ireland, located in southern County Galway.
