= Roundstone, County Galway =

Village in Connemara, Ireland

Roundstone Irish: Cloch na Rón
- Village
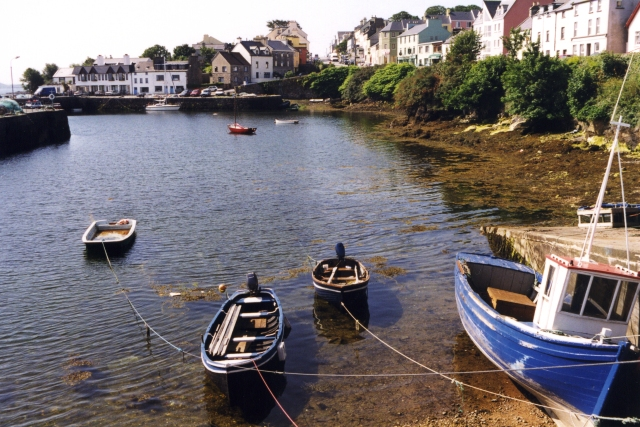
- View of harbour towards Roundstone village

- Location in Ireland
- Coordinates: 53.395°N 9.918°W
- Country: Ireland
- Province: Connacht
- County: County Galway
- Elevation: 20 m (66 ft)

Population (2016)
  - Total: 214
- Irish Grid Reference: L725405
- Website: roundstonevillage.ie

Roundstone (Irish: Cloch na Rón, meaning 'seal's rock') is a village on the west coast of Ireland, in the Connemara region of County Galway. Lying opposite the island of Inishnee on Roundstone Bay, by road it is 76 kilometres (47 mi) northwest of Galway and 18 kilometres (11 mi) southeast of Clifden. Known as a haven for people in the creative arts, it hosts an annual regatta in July.

== Etymology ==
The anglicised name is usually considered an error on the part of the British colonial Ordnance Survey, which translated the village name; while Cloch certainly means "stone" or "rock", Rón means "seal", not "round". Still, the names Cloch na Rón and Roundstone may be totally independent. The bay is referred to as Round-stone Haven as early as 1684 (Roderick O'Flaherty), and the rock after which it is named stands like a marker at the entrance and is strikingly round.

== History ==
The area to the north of Roundstone was ruled by the Chiefs of Clan O'Flaherty, who built a Dominican Priory about 2 miles (3.2 km) to the north of what is now Roundstone in the 15th-century. Roundstone was established by Scottish engineer Alexander Nimmo in the 1820s, while building houses, roads and harbours throughout the West of Ireland. Fishermen from Scotland settled here, and, following Catholic Emancipation, in 1835 a Franciscan Monastery was built. By the end of 1840s it had a thriving fishing industry and a population of 400 people.

== Culture ==
Roundstone is known as a home for creativity and the arts. For many years some of the most important figures in Irish Art have painted there, including Paul Henry, Jack B. Yeats, Gerard Dillon and Nano Reid. Yvonne Kings Studio and the Stable Gallery are notable galleries in the village. The local Summerfest and regatta is held in July. Traditional Irish Nights are held weekly throughout July and August and offers music, song and dance from the Connemara area. Rock star Sting had a home in Roundstone in the early 1980s, where he wrote most of the songs for The Police's third album, Zenyatta Mondatta.

Roundstone is twinned with the village of Noyelles-sous-Lens (a suburb of Lens, Pas-de-Calais) in France.

Films shot in Roundstone include The Mackintosh Man (1973) by John Huston, Into the West (1992) by Mike Newell, The Matchmaker (1997) by Mark Joffe, Marley & Me (2008) by David Frankel and Love Me No More (2008) by Jean Becker. The six-part drama series, North Sea Connection was filmed there in 2021.

== Transport ==
The village is connected to the rest of the national road network via a regional road, the R341, which connects it to the N59.

== Gallery ==
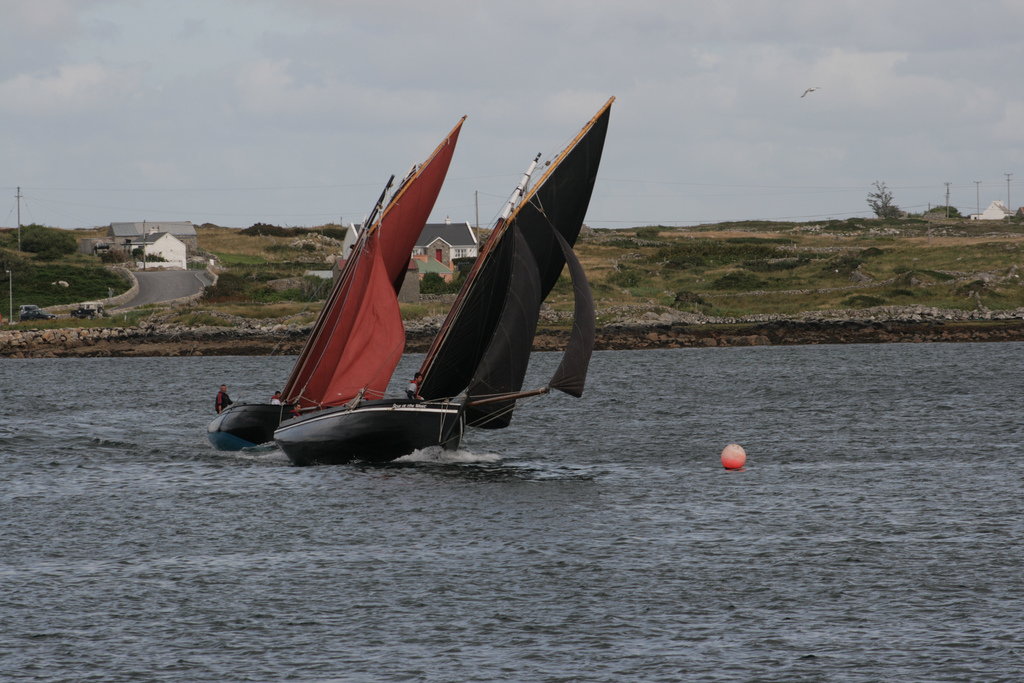
Two hookers at the Roundstone Regatta 2008

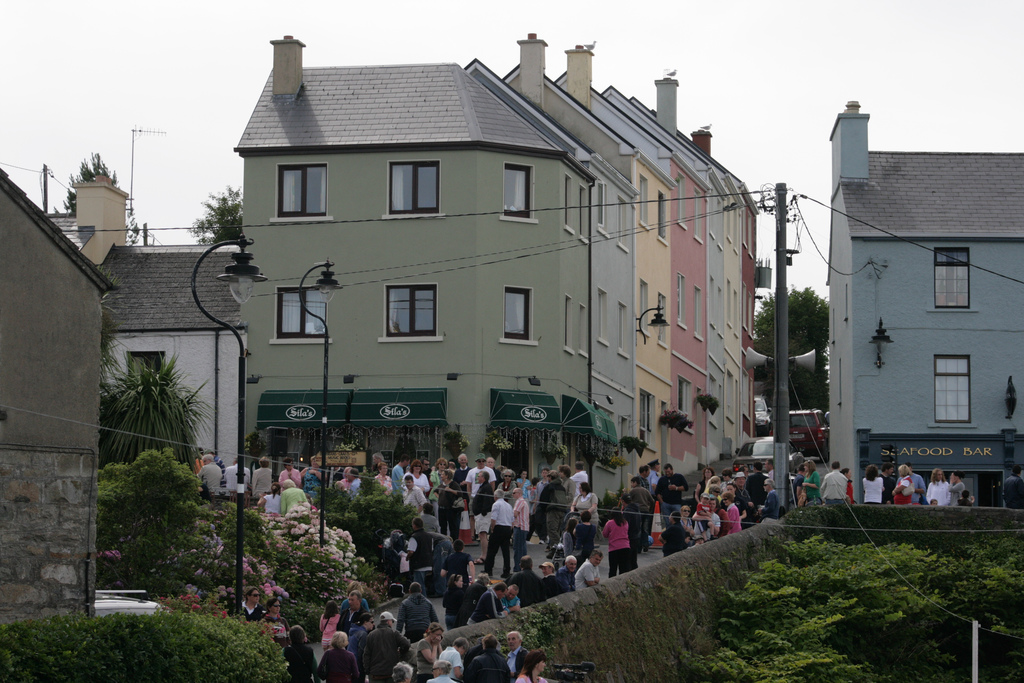
Roundstone village during the Roundstone Regatta weekend in 2008

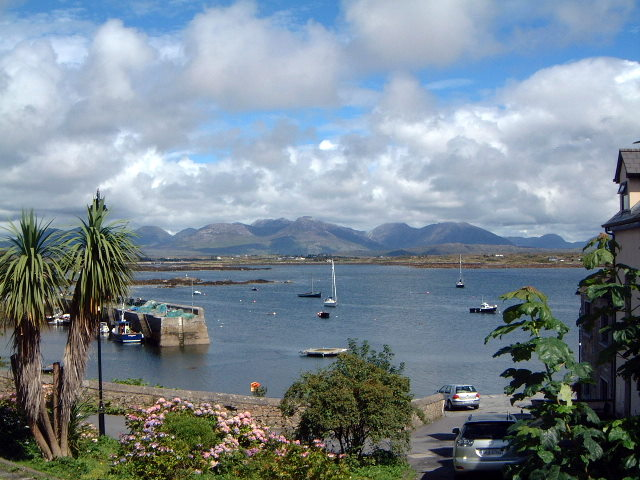
The view of Galway Bay from Roundstone

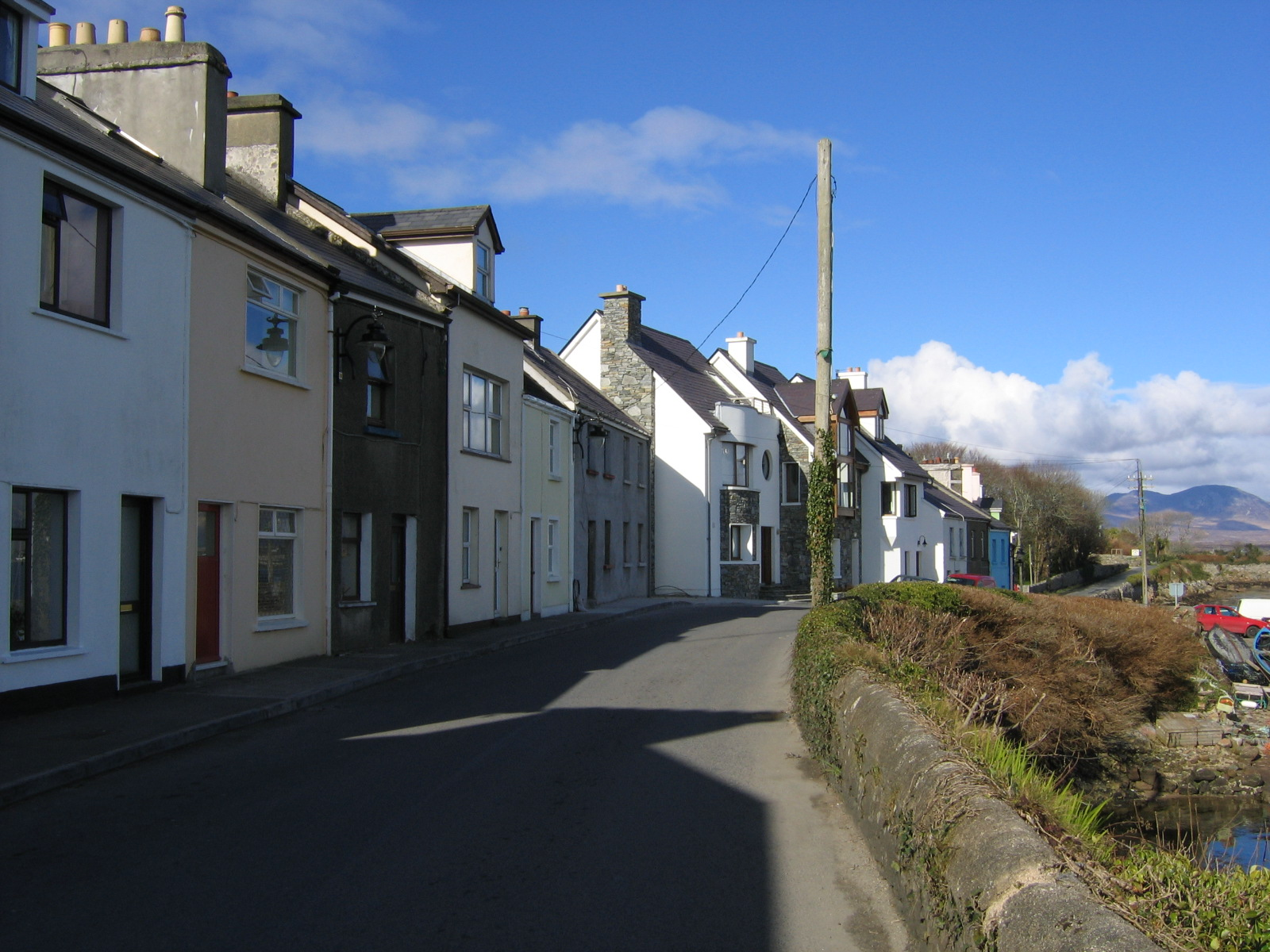
Northbound on the R341 road in Roundstone

== See also ==
- List of towns and villages in Ireland
