= Moycullen (barony) =

Barony in County Galway, Ireland

Moycullen Maigh Cuilinn (Irish)
- Barony
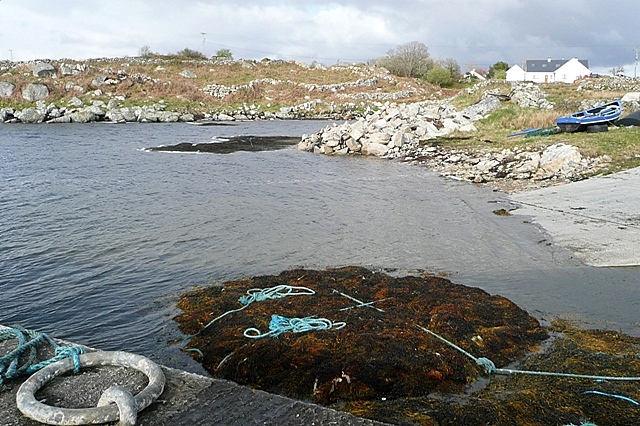
- Harbour at Muckanaghederdauhaulia

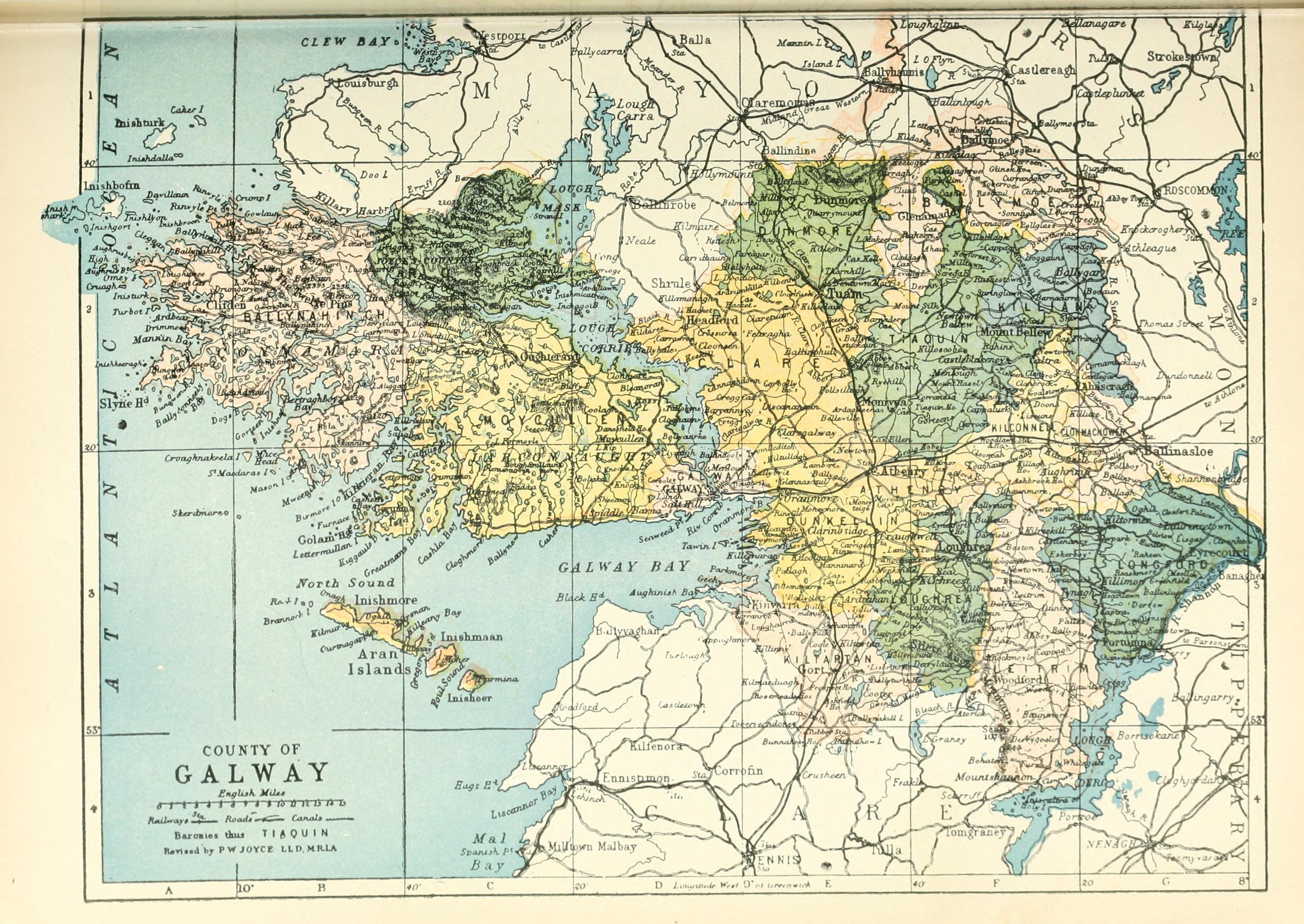
- Barony map of County Galway, 1900; Moycullen is in the west, coloured yellow.

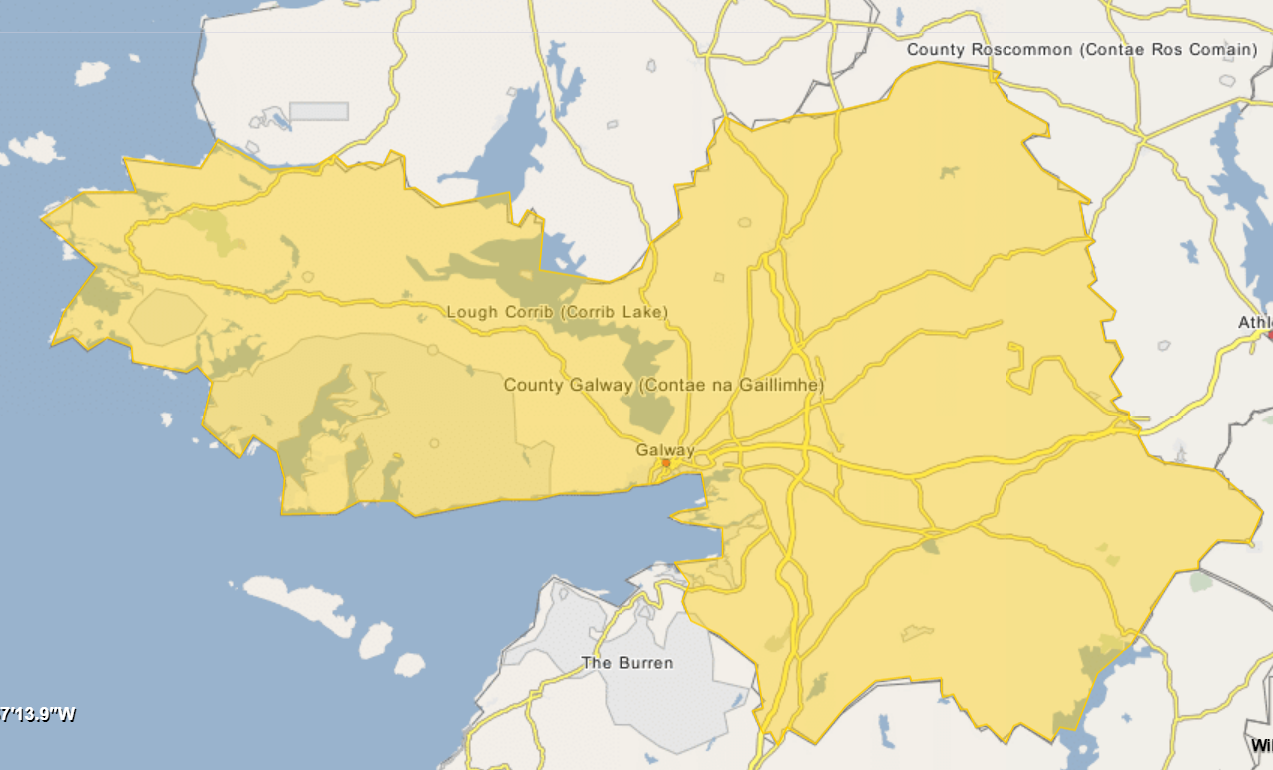
- Location within County Galway
- Coordinates: 53°20′N 9°34′W
- Sovereign state: Ireland
- Province: Connacht
- County: Galway

Area
  - Total: 819.0 km^{2} (316.2 sq mi)

Moycullen (Irish: Maigh Cuilinn) is a historical barony in west County Galway, Ireland.

Baronies were mainly cadastral rather than administrative units. They acquired modest local taxation and spending functions in the 19th century before being superseded by the Local Government (Ireland) Act 1898.

== History ==
The name is from the village of Moycullen, which name means "plain of holly" or "plain of (Saint) Uillinn." This was the site of the chief castle of the O'Flaherty, now in ruins.

In the Gaelic Irish era, the territory of Delbhna Tír Dhá Locha roughly corresponds to the barony of Moycullen; it was ruled by the Mac Con Raoi (MacConroys). In the 11th century the Ó Flaithbheartaigh (O'Flaherty) were pushed westward and took over the area, becoming lords of Moycullen and Iar Connacht.

Moycullen barony was created before 1574.

== Geography ==
Moycullen is in the west of the county, on the north coast of Galway Bay, and to the west of Lough Corrib and Galway City. It is a large barony, incorporating part of the Connemara region. It is chiefly composed of pasture and bog, with several forests in the centre and many lakes dotted around the barony.

== List of settlements ==
Settlements within the historical barony of Moycullen include:

- Baile na hAbhann
- Camus
- Carraroe
- Casla
- Furbo
- Gorumna
- Inverin
- Lettermullen
- Lettermore
- Maam Cross
- Moycullen
- Oughterard
- Rosmuc
- Rossaveal
- Spiddal
