= Screeb =

Village in County Galway, Ireland

Coordinates: 53°23′06″N 9°33′10″W

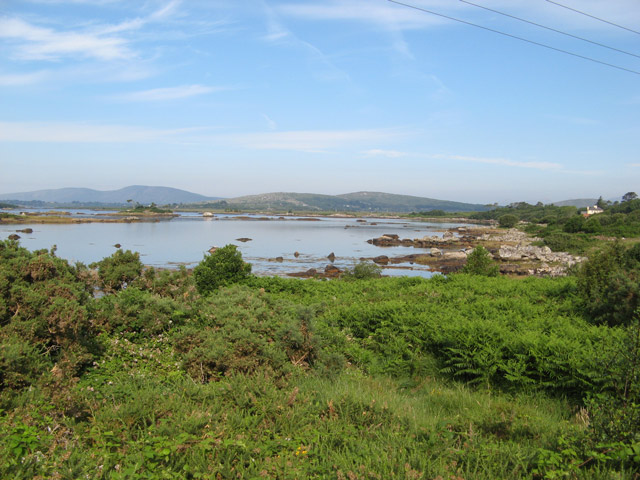
Coastal view from near Screeb House

Screeb (Irish: An Scríob, meaning 'furrowed land') is a small village in south-west Connemara, County Galway, Ireland. It is located on the R336 road, north of Casla and southwest of Oughterard. It was previously the location of one of Ireland's few peat-burning power stations.

== Power station ==
Screeb was the site of one of the four smallest of Ireland's peat-burning power stations. This station, along with identical plants at Gweedore, Milltown Malbay and Cahersiveen, was designed to be powered by hand-worked peat with a generation capacity of 5MW's. While this was uneconomic, it was a source of employment locally at the time. The power station eventually closed in 1989.

== Screeb House ==
Screeb House (now styled 'Screebe House') was built c. 1860 as a hunting and fishing lodge and later extended. It was built by Thomas Fuge and was a former residence for the Berridge family, the local landlords in the 19th century. Lord and Lady Dudley (founder of the Dudley Nurses) and Sir William Orpen also spent time in this house. Orpen completed some paintings in the area - "Old John's Cottage" was painted in the nearby house of John (Seán) and Mary Geoghegan in Doire Bhainbh in 1908 and he also painted "The Holy Well" with scenes from the Aran Islands and nearby An Teach Dóite (Maam Cross). As of 2024, the lodge is a hotel and restaurant.

== See also ==
- Camus, County Galway
- List of towns and villages in Ireland
