= Camus, County Galway =

Village in County Galway, Ireland

Camas Camus
- Village
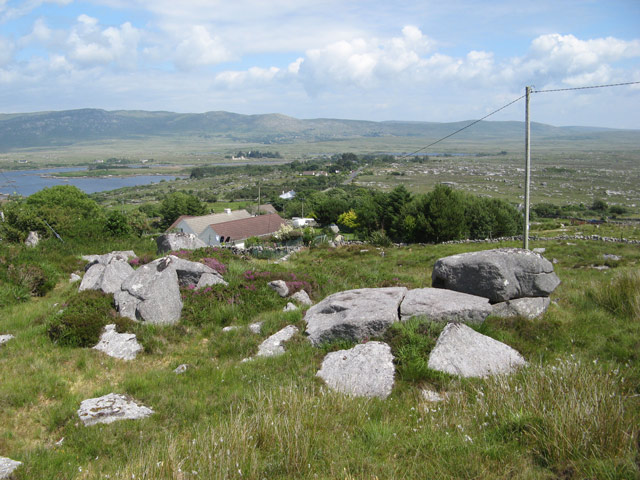
- Landscape and houses in the Camus Oughter area

- Location in Ireland
- Coordinates: 53°22′23″N 9°33′32″W
- Country: Ireland
- Province: Connacht
- County: County Galway
- Elevation: 54 m (177 ft)
- Irish Grid Reference: L963370
- Camas is the official spelling

Camus or Camas is a small village in the Connemara Gaeltacht of County Galway, Ireland. It is between Casla and An Teach Dóite, and is divided into Camas Uachtair and Camas Íochtair, as well as several other townlands, such as Scríob, Gleann Trasna, Leitir Móir, and Doire Bhainbh.

The village has the highest percentage of Irish language speakers in the Gaeltacht.

== Name ==
The names Camus and Camas are both used. However Camus, which has been in use for generations in both Irish and English, has been retained by the great majority of the population. The name in Irish refers to the shape of the nearby bay in which the tides come and go through the narrow strait at Dun Manus and enter Camus bay at an angle. The explanation of the name sometimes given - 'cam uisce' or crooked water - is etymologically unsustainable. Camus is also known in song as Camus na bhFoirnéis, meaning "Camus of the furnaces". It is believed that a small foundry was operated near the small bridge at the centre of the area in the 18th century.

== Notable buildings ==
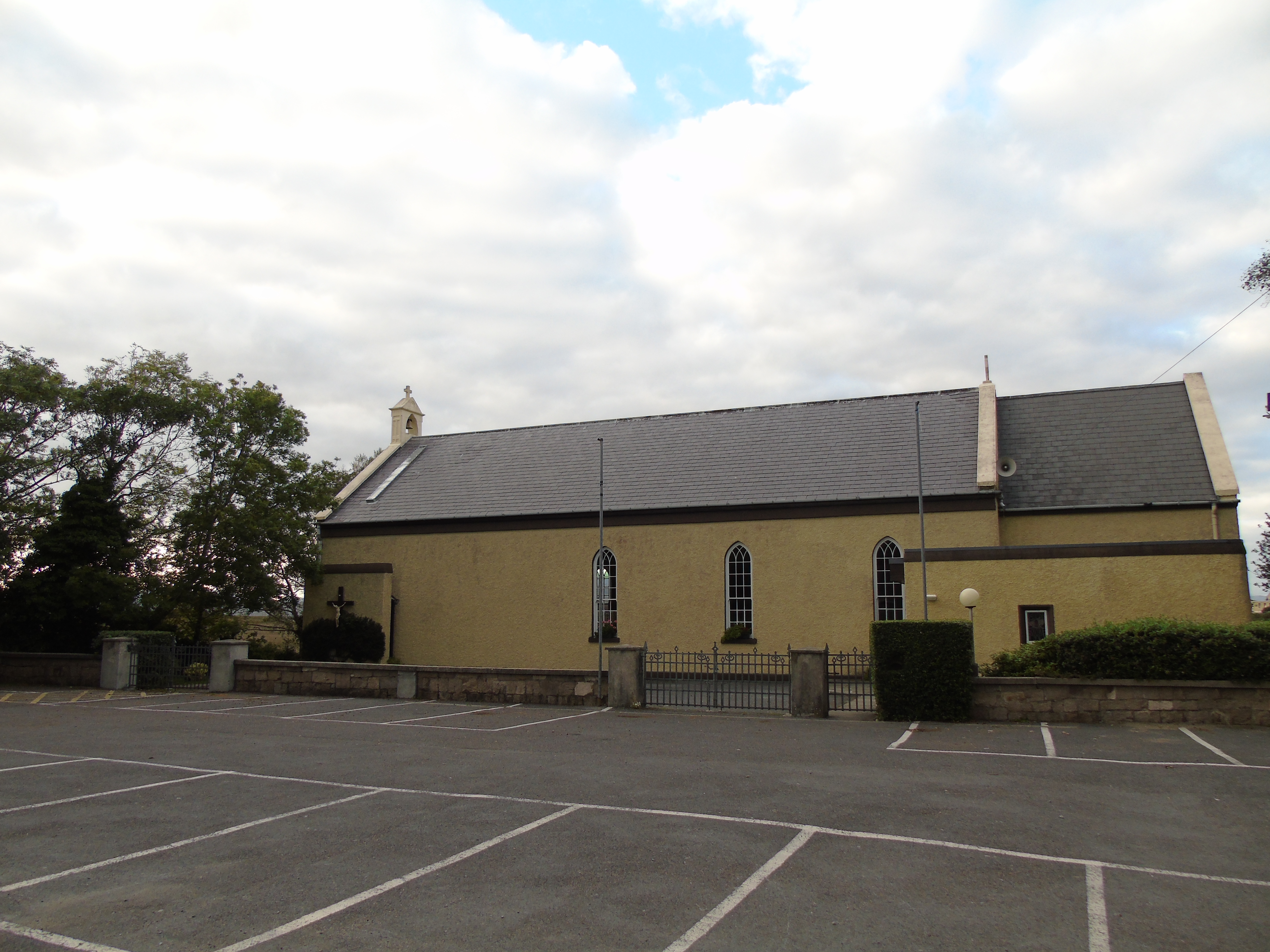
St Mary's Church, Camus

The former Camus national school, in Derry townland, was built in 1876. The nearby Roman Catholic church, St Mary's Church, was completed in 1897.

== See also ==
- Connacht Irish
- List of towns and villages in Ireland
- Lettermuckoo
- Muckanaghederdauhaulia
