= Furbo, County Galway =

Village in County Galway, Ireland

Furbo
- Village
- Na Forbacha (Irish)
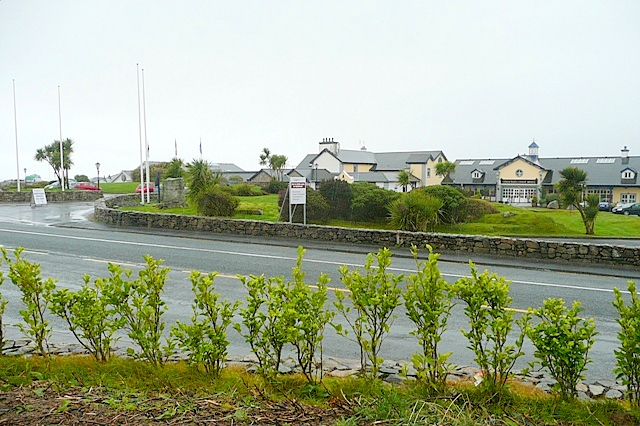
- Hotel and coastal road at Furbo (Na Forbacha)

- Location in Ireland
- Coordinates: 53°14′56″N 9°12′18″W
- Country: Ireland
- Province: Connacht
- County: County Galway
- Elevation: 15 m (49 ft)

Population (2022)
  - Total: 868
- Irish Grid Reference: M199288
- Na Forbacha is the only official name. The anglicised spellings Furbo and Furbogh have no official status.

Furbo or Furbogh (officially known as Na Forbacha in both Irish and English) is a settlement in Connemara, County Galway, Ireland. As of the 2022 census, it had a population of 868 people. It lies along the coast, overlooking Galway Bay, in a Gaeltacht (Irish speaking) area.

== Location ==
Furbo lies between Barna and Spiddal on the coastal R336 road. It is a typical Gaeltacht-style settlement with no village centre, but rather comprises around fourteen townlands, most of which run north to south from the bog to the foreshore. Furbo (officially Na Forbacha) spans the townlands of Cnocán an Bhodaigh, an Straidhp, an tSaoirsin, Baile na hAbhann, na Poillíní, Doire Uachtair, Aill an Phréacháin, an Coisméig Mór, na Forbacha Garbha, Seanadh Fhréachóg, and Cnoc na Gréine.

== Irish language ==
Located in a Gaeltacht area, Irish is the main language used in the local school, church and at community meetings. The headquarters of the Gaeltacht Authority, Údarás na Gaeltachta, is located in Na Forbacha.

The figure for those who self-report as speaking Irish daily is 39%. Housing developments in the area have a requirement that 80% plus of housing units are reserved for Irish speakers.

== Amenities ==
Furbo has a large community pitch (the Sportlann) which is used by several sports groups. These include the local hurling club (Bearna/Na Forbacha GAA), Gaelic football club (CLG Bhearna), and soccer club (Bearna Na Forbacha Aontaithe).

The local Catholic church is Our Lady Star of the Sea church (Séipéal Mhuire Réalt na Mara). It is in the parish of Bearna & na Forbacha in the Roman Catholic Diocese of Galway, Kilmacduagh and Kilfenora. A mausoleum, alongside the church, dates to c. 1860.

The national (primary) school, Scoil na bhForbacha, had an enrollment of over 200 pupils as of 2023.

== Notable people ==
- John Henry Blake (1808–1882), land agent
- Diarmuid Ó Gráinne (1950–2013), writer and journalist
- Helenus Milmo (1908–1988), Irish lawyer in Britain and High Court judge, and member of MI5

== See also ==
- List of towns and villages in Ireland
