= R342 road (Ireland) =

Road in Ireland

Coordinates: 53.419743°N 9.822756°W

R342 road
- Bóthar R342
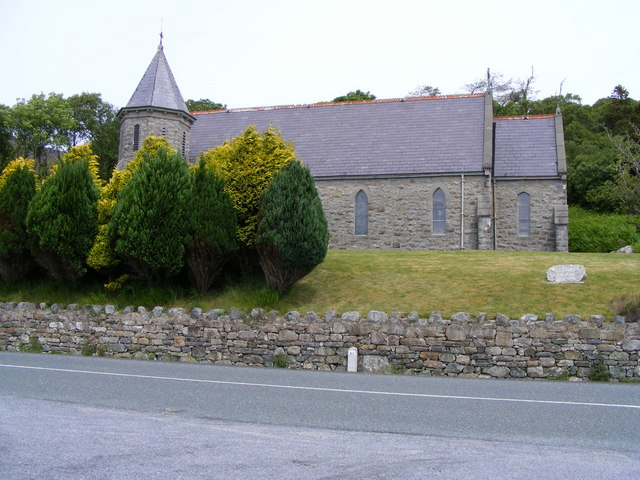
- R342 passing St. James' Church, Cashel.

Route information
- Length: 7.8 km (4.8 mi)

Major junctions
- From: R341 Derryadd West (Doire Fhada Thiar)
- To: R340 Lettershinna (Leitir Seanaidh)

Location
- Country: Ireland

Highway system
- Roads in Ireland; Motorways; Primary; Secondary; Regional

The R342 road is a regional road in Ireland, located in southern County Galway, part of the Carna Road.
