= R336 road (Ireland) =

Regional road in County Galway, Ireland

R336 road
- Bóthar R336
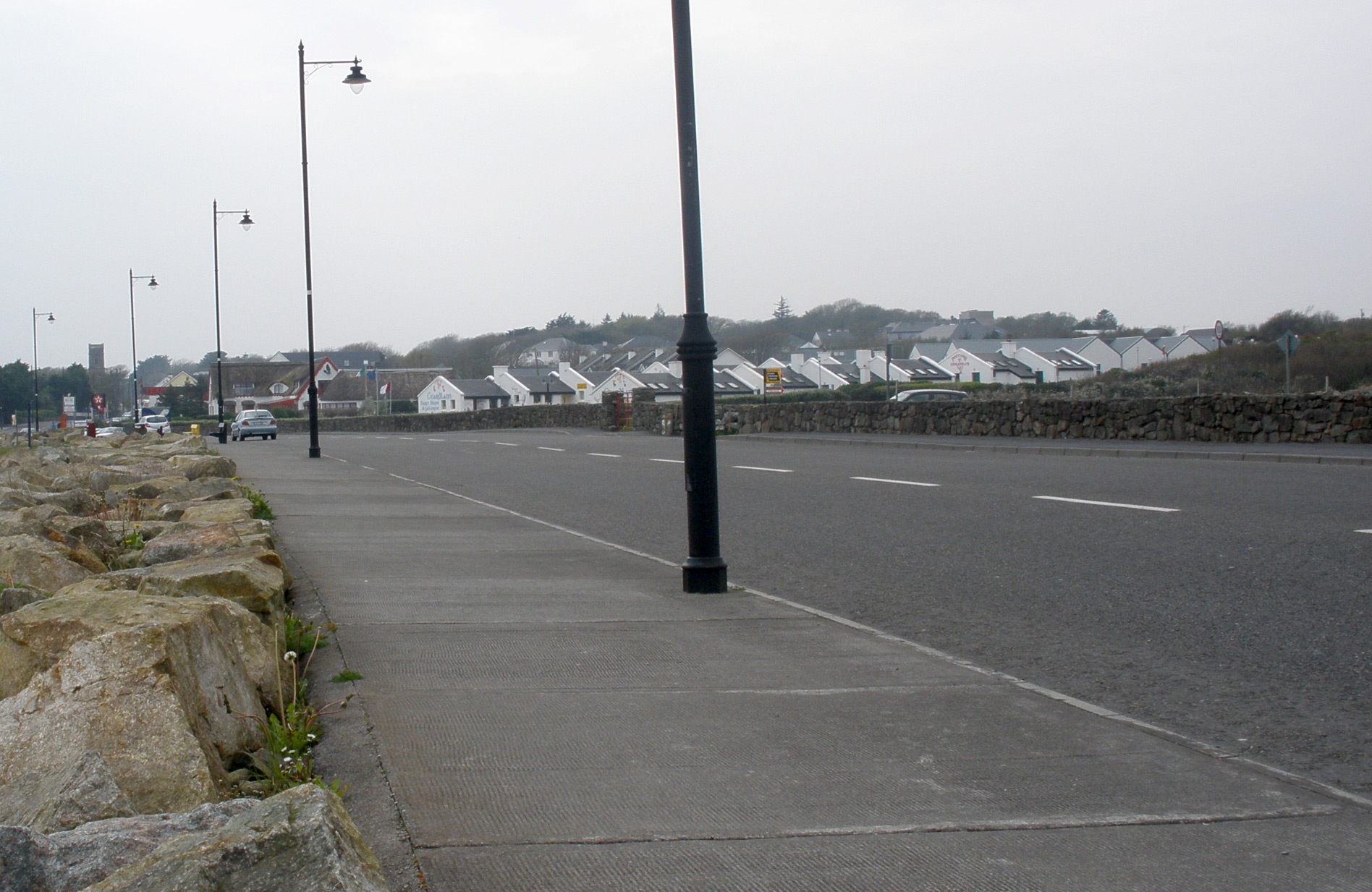
- The R336 road approaching Spiddal

Route information
- Length: 83 km (52 mi)

Location
- Country: Ireland
- Primary destinations: County Galway; Leenaun (N59); Crosses Joyce's River; Maum (R345); Crosses the Bealanabrack River; Maam Cross (N59 again); Crosses Ardderry Lough; Screeb (R340); Kinvara; Costelloe (R343); Crosses the Cashla River; R372 road; Indreabhán; Crosses the Crumlin River; Crosses the Owenboliskey River; Spiddal; Crosses the Furbogh River; Furbo; Crosses Sruthán na Libeirtí; Barna; Crosses the Trusky Stream; Salthill; Crosses the River Corrib; Galway (N6, N83)

Highway system
- Roads in Ireland; Motorways; Primary; Secondary; Regional

The R336 road is a regional road in County Galway in Ireland which connects the N59 road at Leenaun beside Killary Harbour – via Indreabhán – to the N6 and N83 in Galway, 83 kilometres (52 mi) to the southeast (map).

On leaving the fjord in Killary Harbour at Leenaun, the road travels south between the Maumturk and Partry mountain ranges in Joyce Country and passes through the Irish speaking Gaeltacht district of Connemara, and the villages and towns of Maum (where it meets the R345 road), Maam Cross (where it crosses the N59 again), Screeb (where it meets the R340 road), Kinvara, and Costelloe (where it meets the R343 road), and the R372 road. The R336 then turns east and travels along the shore of Galway Bay, passing through Indreabhán, Spiddal, Furbo, Barna, Salthill, and Galway, where it joins the N6 and N83 roads.

The government legislation that defines the R336, the Roads Act 1993 (Classification of Regional Roads) Order 2012 (Statutory Instrument 54 of 2012), provides the following official description:

R336: Leenaun — An Teach Dóite — An Spidéal, County Galway — Galway

Between its junction with N59 at Leenaun in the county of Galway and its junction with N6 at Bothan na dTreabh in the city of Galway via Muintir Eoghain Thior, An Mám, Tír na Cille Theas, An Teach Dóite, Dóire Bhanbh, Camas Íochtair, Dóire an Fhéich, Casla, Na Doiriú Theas, Indreabhán, An Spidéal, Bearna and Knockaunacarragh in the county of Galway: Bóthar Bhearna, Knocknacarragh Cross, Salthill Road Upper, Seapoint Promenade, Doctor Colohan Road, Whitestrand Road, Father Griffin Road, Wolfe Tone Bridge, Flood Street, New Dock Street, Merchants Road, (and via Queen Street and Dock Road), Victoria Place, Eyre Square South, Eyre Square East, Prospect Hill (and via Bothar Uí Eithir and Forster Street), Bohermore, Cemetery Cross and Tuam Road in the city of Galway.

== Proposed improvement ==
A 2014 County Development Plan (for the period 2015–2021) has again identified the need for an R336 upgrade, specifically between Barna and Screeb, a distance of 42 kilometres (26 mi). The plan considers the road a "a major obstacle to developing the South Connemara region and economy". The plan calls for a major realignment of the road, replacing most of the present route.

== See also ==
- Roads in Ireland
- National primary road
- National secondary road
