= R374 road (Ireland) =

Road in Ireland

R374 road
- Bóthar R374
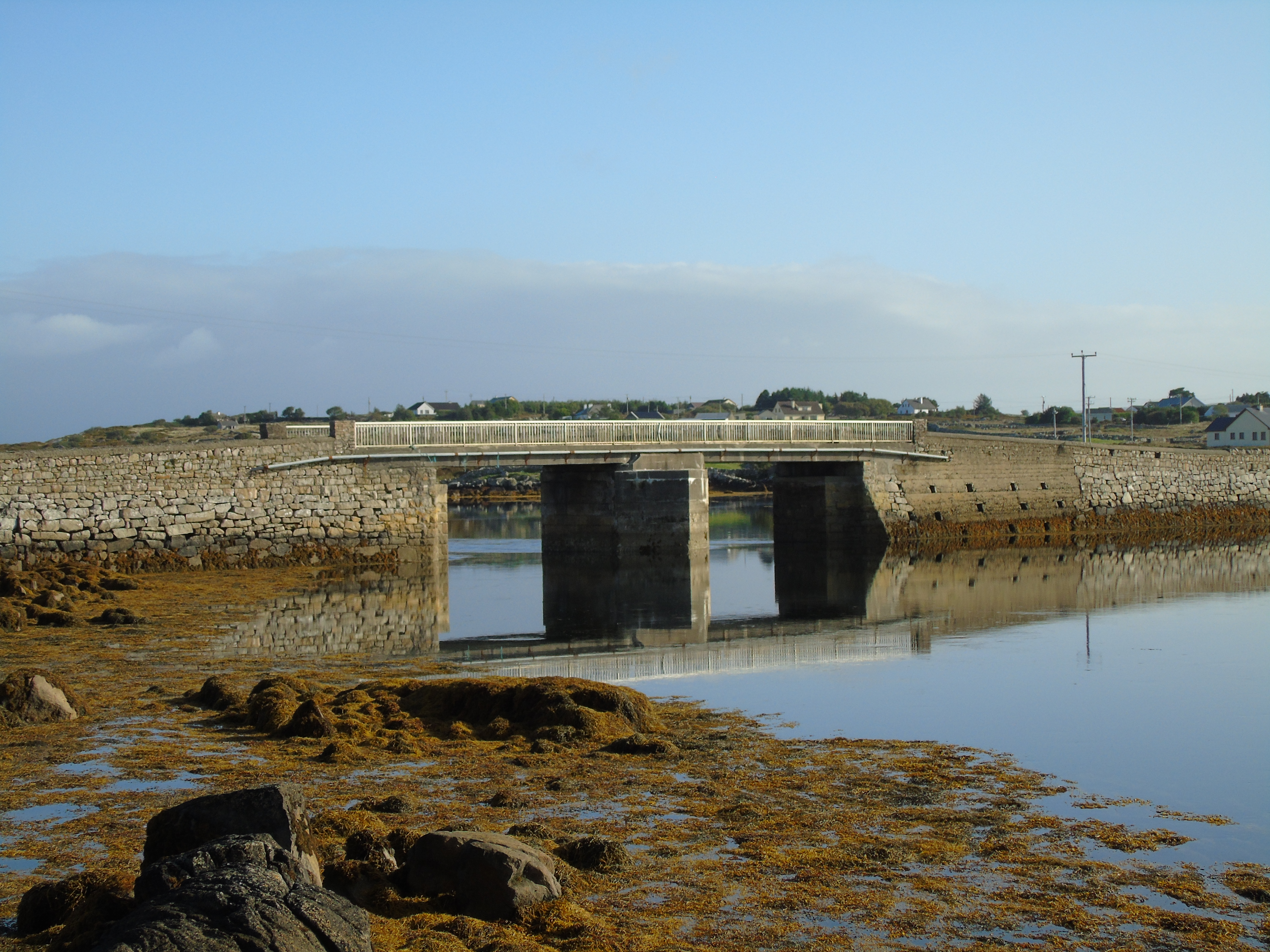
- Bealadangan Bridge, part of the R374

Location
- Country: Ireland

Highway system
- Roads in Ireland; Motorways; Primary; Secondary; Regional

The R374 road is a regional road in County Galway, Ireland. It connects various islands in Connemara, the Gaeltacht (Irish speaking) part of the county.

The official description of the R374 from the Roads Act 1993 (Classification of Regional Roads) Order 2006 reads:

R374: Casla - Lettermullen, County Galway

Between its junction with R343 at Doire an Fhéich and its terminal point at its junction with local road 5234 at Leitir Mealláin Post Office via An Cheathrú Thair, Droichead Bhéal an Daingin, Leitir Móir, Droichead Charraig an Logáin, Tír an Fhia and Kiggaul Bridge all in the county of Galway.

== See also ==
- Roads in Ireland
- National primary road
- National secondary road
- Regional road
