= Moycullen =

Gaeltacht village near Galway city, Ireland

Maigh Cuilinn Moycullen
- Village
- Signs outside Moycullen village

- Location in Ireland
- Coordinates: 53°20′21″N 9°10′50″W
- Country: Ireland
- Province: Connacht
- County: County Galway
- Elevation: 86 m (282 ft)

Population (2022)
  - Total: 2,279
- Irish Grid Reference: M198329
- As this is a Gaeltacht village, the Irish Maigh Cuilinn is the only official name. The anglicized spelling Moycullen has no official standing.

Moycullen (Irish: Maigh Cuilinn) is a village situated in the Gaeltacht region of County Galway, Ireland, about 10 km (7 mi) northwest of Galway city. It is near Lough Corrib, on the N59 road to Oughterard and Clifden, in Connemara. Moycullen is now a satellite town of Galway, with some residents commuting to the city for work, school, and business. The population increased by 33.7% from the 2016 census, reaching 2,279 in 2022.

Although Moycullen and its hinterland are classified as a ‘Gaeltacht’ area, the language has not been the local vernacular for many years. Moycullen falls under a Category C Gaeltacht Area due to its low percentage of daily Irish speakers.

== Education ==
There is a primary school in the village, Scoil Mhuire, and three other primary schools in the parish: Scoil Naomh Bríde in Tullykyne, Scoil Bhaile Nua in Newtown, and Scoil Naomh Cholmáin in Tooreeny.

== Catholic parish ==
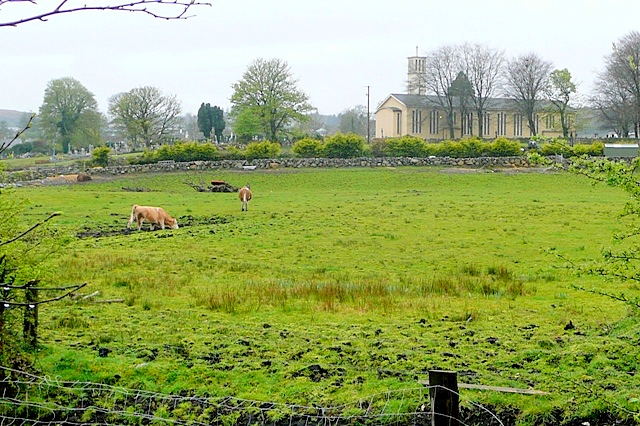
Field and church in Moycullen

The Catholic parish of Moycullen, which is part of the Roman Catholic Diocese of Galway, Kilmacduagh and Kilfenora, is roughly co-extensive with Moycullen civil parish. The Church of the Immaculate Conception is located in the village.

== Sport ==
It is home to two senior GAA clubs, a handball club and the Moycullen Basketball Club. Moycullen footballers won the Galway Senior Football Championship for the first time in 2020, as-well as 2022, and were victorious in the All-Ireland Intermediate Club Football Championship in 2008. The women's team won the Connacht intermediate Club Championship in 2017. Moycullen hurlers won the intermediate county championship in 1964 and 2011, the 2011 team going on to win the Connacht Intermediate Club Championship. In basketball, Moycullen won the President's Cup in 2009.

== Railway ==
Moycullen railway station was opened by the Midland Great Western Railway on 1 January 1895, as part of its line from Galway to Clifden. The station, and the line, were closed by the Great Southern Railways on 29 April 1935.

== People ==
- Seán Kyne, politician
- Mary O'Malley, poet

== See also ==
- List of towns and villages in Ireland
