= Casla =

Village in Connemara, Ireland

Casla (Costelloe)
- Village
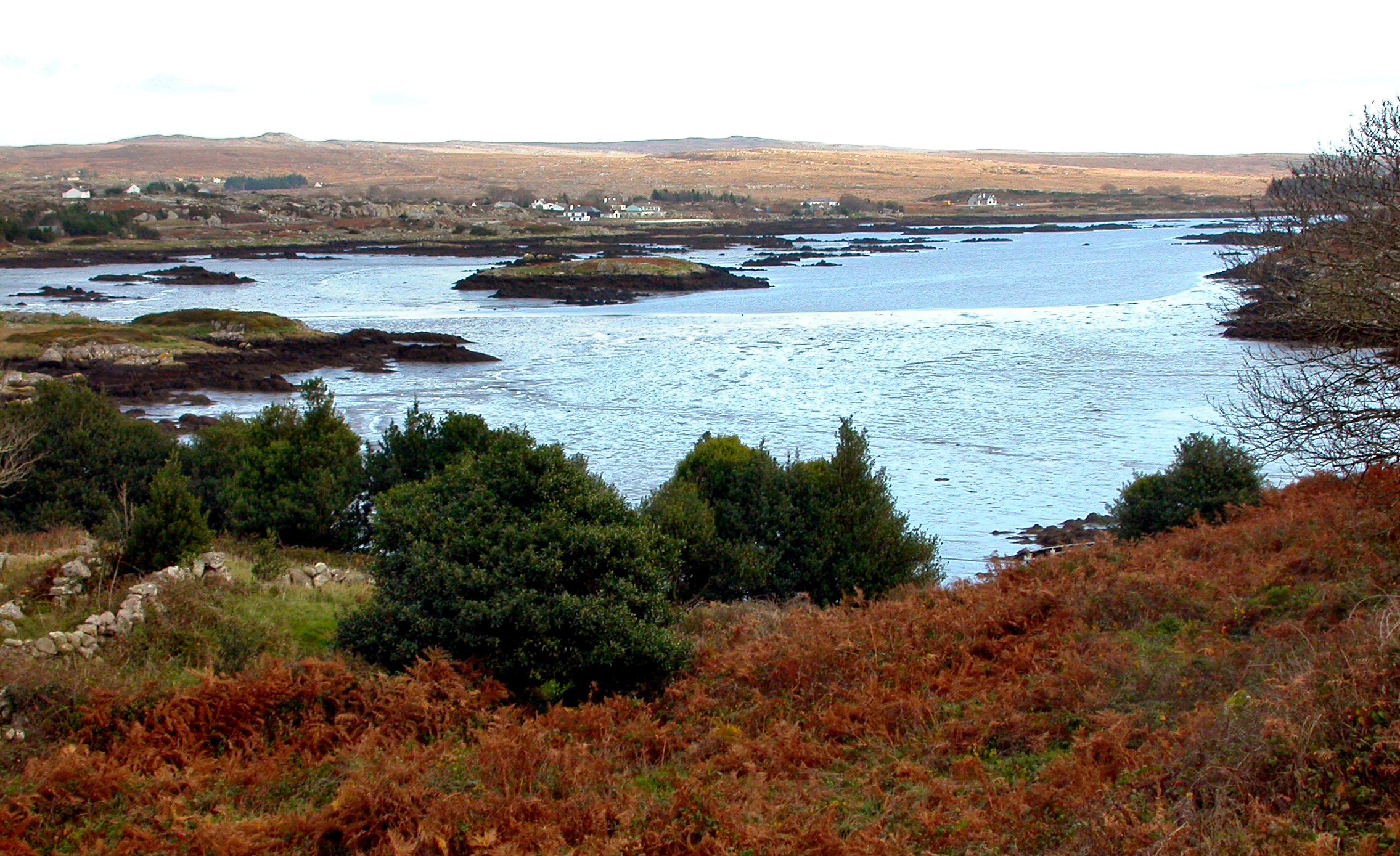

- Location in Ireland
- Coordinates: 53°17′27″N 9°32′49″W
- Country: Ireland
- Province: Connacht
- County: County Galway
- Elevation: 7 m (23 ft)
- Irish Grid Reference: L968278
- Casla is the official name. The previous official name Costelloe was replaced by the Official Languages Act 2003.

Casla (also known as Costelloe) is a Gaeltacht village between Indreabhán (Inverin) and An Cheathrú Rua (Carraroe) in western County Galway, Ireland. The headquarters of RTÉ Raidió na Gaeltachta is located there. The village lies on the R336 road beside Clynagh Bay. Casla is said to mean "(twisting) creek" or "inlet from the sea" in Irish; but also appears as the feminine form of the ancient sept name gCaislé, a people who lived in the area between Casla and An Cheathrú Rua in ancient times, from whom the Costelloe family (not to be confused with the Norman Costello sept of Mayo) claim descent.

The village is served by Bus Éireann route 424 from Galway City.

In the novel The Wind Changes by Olivia Manning, set among the Irish independence fighters in 1921, the pier of the village is mentioned several times as part of the plot; with Riordan, the last of the leaders of the 1916 Easter Rising, supposedly said to be set to land at the pier in 'Costello' (sic).

Costelloe Lodge is a large house built in 1925 by the architect Edwin Lutyens with gardens designed by Gertrude Jekyll, to replace a fishing lodge that was burned down in 1922 during the Irish Civil War. It was the home of J. Bruce Ismay, the English chairman of the White Star Line. Ismay was severely criticised after surviving the sinking of the Titanic because he took a place in a lifeboat instead of going down with the vessel.

== Notable people ==
- Caitlín Maude, poet, activist, and singer
- J. Bruce Ismay, shipowner

== See also ==
- List of towns in the Republic of Ireland
