= List of islands of Ireland =

This is a list of islands of Ireland. Ireland is itself an island, lying west of the island of Great Britain and northwest of mainland Europe.

The Hebrides off Scotland and Anglesey off Wales were grouped with Ireland ("Hibernia") by the Greco-Roman geographer Ptolemy, but this was not geographically correct and is purely of historical interest.

== Largest offshore islands by area and population ==
English name	County	Area Hectares (Acres)	Population 2022	Area Rank	Population Rank	Bridge / Causeway
Great Island	Cork	2,475 (6,115)	>13000	4	1	Yes
Achill Island	Mayo	14,279 (35,283)	2345	1	2	Yes
Gorumna	Galway	2,376 (5,871)	1044	5	3	Yes
Inishmore	Galway	3,090 (7,635)	820	2	4	No
Valentia Island or Valencia Island	Kerry	2,578 (6,371)	658	3	5	Yes
Lettermore	Galway	912 (2,254)	542	12	6	Yes
Arranmore or Aran Island	Donegal	1,754 (4,335)	478	7	7	No
Inch Island	Donegal	1,386 (3,425)	396	10	8	Yes
Inisheer or Inishere	Galway	570 (1,400)	343	17	9	No
Bere Island or Bear Island	Cork	1,769 (4,372)	218	6	10	No
Lettermullen or Lettermullan	Galway	318 (787)	214	25	11	Yes
Inishmaan	Galway	948 (2,342)	184	13	12	No
Inishbofin	Galway	1,275 (3,151)	184	11	12	No
Rathlin Island	Antrim	1,437 (3,552)	141	9	c.22	No
Clare Island	Mayo	1,640 (4,053)	138	8		No

== Total population of Irish offshore islands ==
The number of people living on Irish offshore islands decreased dramatically during the Irish famine and the period following it. Since then the trend on most islands has been a decreasing population until the 1950s and 1960s, during which many islands were forcibly evacuated by the Irish Government as continuous bad weather meant that islanders were unable to travel to the mainland for several consecutive months. Of the remaining islands that were not evacuated, many of their populations have continued to dwindle ever since, with some seeing stabilisation or even a slight increase in population during and after the Celtic Tiger.

The chart below shows the total number of people living on Irish islands throughout the years.

Historical population

Year	Pop.	±%
1841	34,219	—
1851	29,314	−14.3%
1861	27,948	−4.7%
1871	26,571	−4.9%
1881	29,226	+10.0%
1891	26,149	−10.5%
1901	25,446	−2.7%
1911	24,700	−2.9%
1926	21,662	−12.3%

Year	Pop.	±%
1936	19,926	−8.0%
1946	18,665	−6.3%
1951	17,488	−6.3%
1956	16,118	−7.8%
1961	14,473	−10.2%
1966	12,899	−10.9%
1971	11,737	−9.0%
1979	10,866	−7.4%
1981	10,869	+0.0%

Year	Pop.	±%
1986	10,409	−4.2%
1991	9,569	−8.1%
1996	9,280	−3.0%
2002	8,884	−4.3%
2006	8,983	+1.1%
2011	9,087	+1.2%
2016	8,756	−3.6%
2022	8,931	+2.0%

Source: Central Statistics Office. "CNA17: Population by Off Shore Island, Sex and Year". CSO.ie.

== Full table ==
English name	Irish name (Note: Taken from the Placenames Database of Ireland entry linked in the PDI ref column)	County	Group/Location	Area Acres (Note: Unless stated otherwise, area is from Ordnance Survey Ireland's 19th-century 6" maps (viewable via the Historic 6" layer of the link in the OS-map column))	Height Metres (Note: Unless stated otherwise, height is from Ordnance Survey Ireland's 1:50,000 series maps (viewable for Republic of Ireland islands via the Wind Report layer of the link in the OS-map column ))	Population 1841	Population 2022	Connection to mainland	Coordinates	OS grid	OS map	PDI ref
Rathlin Island	Reachlainn	Antrim	North Channel	3552	134	1010	141	Passenger ferry from Ballycastle	55°17′32″N 6°11′30″W	D1452		61298
The Maidens or Hulin Rocks	Na Maighdeanacha	Antrim	North Channel				0	None	54°55.7′N 5°43.6′W	D4612		1166440
Angus Rock		Down	Strangford Lough	0.4	2	0	0		54°19′51″N 5°31′34″W	J6145		—
Copeland Island	Oileán Chóplainn	Down	North Channel	295	33 (Note: Converted from height in feet given on Ordnance Survey Ireland's 19th-century 6" maps (viewable via the Historic 6" layer of the link in the OS-map column))	31			54°40′29″N 5°31′44″W	J6083		1166534
Cannon Rock		Down	North Channel						54°24′28.7″N 5°21′59.6″W	J676531		—
Mid Island		Down	Strangford Lough	15		7				J566672		65848
Rough Island		Down	Strangford Lough	7	13	4		Causeway accessible at low tide		J494689		66037
Reagh Island		Down	Strangford Lough	128	19	14		Road		J525650		66111
Mahee Island	Inis Mochaoi	Down	Strangford Lough	177	27	28		Road via Reagh Island		J532640		66110
Wood Island		Down	Strangford Lough	23	8	4				J510642		66116
Rainey Island		Down	Strangford Lough	40		10				J528631		65894
Sketrick Island		Down	Strangford Lough	41		11		Road		J526625		65898
Trasnagh Island		Down	Strangford Lough	25		13				J536620		65899
Roe Island		Down	Strangford Lough	21		7				J542610		65896
Conley Island or Conly Island		Down	Strangford Lough	65		23				J529609		66233
Dunsy Island		Down	Strangford Lough	33	24	6				J543590		66236
Islandmore		Down	Strangford Lough	122	18	18				J541581		66241
Pawle Island		Down	Strangford Lough	50		12				J543573		66271
Simmy Island		Down	Strangford Lough	8		3				J531557		66274
Island Taggart		Down	Strangford Lough	77		15				J533547		66266
Castle Island		Down	Strangford Lough	113	37	68		Road		J511488		66882
Gores Island or Gore's Island		Down	Strangford Lough	99	30	18				J521494		66883
Salt Island		Down	Strangford Lough	51	16	2				J530502		66895
Rockabill	Cloch Dábhiolla	Dublin	Irish Sea			0	0		53°36′N 6°0′W	O321627		1165790
Colt Island	Inis Coilt	Dublin	Skerries	7	13	0	0		53°35′N 6°5′W	O265612		17032
St Patrick's Island	Inis Pádraig	Dublin	Skerries	15	12	0	0		53°35′7″N 6°4′26″W	O275612		17034
Shenick Island or Shenick's Island	Oileán Sionnaigh	Dublin	Skerries	15	8	4	0		53°34′20″N 6°5′1″W	O268598		17033
Lambay Island	Reachrainn	Dublin	Irish Sea	595	126 (Knockbane, and Tinian Hill)	89	16		53°29′30″N 6°1′0″W	O3151		1166603
Ireland's Eye	Inis Mac Neasáin	Dublin	Irish Sea	53	69	0	0		53°24′19″N 6°3′49″W	O2941		1166256
Bull Island or North Bull	Oileán an Bhulla	Dublin	Dublin Bay	c.740	4	12	14	Road causeways	53°22′1″N 6°8′55″W	O2337		57172
Dalkey Island	Oileán Dheilginse	Dublin	Irish Sea	21	90	8	0		53°16′N 6°5′W	O278263		16606
Keeragh Islands		Wexford	Saint George's Channel						52°11′42″N 6°43′54″W			
Begerin Island or Beggerin Island	Beigéirinn	Wexford	North Slob	22 (Note: 19th-century area, before reclamation)	5	20	0	Road (no longer an island)		T082251		53675
Tuskar Rock	an Tuscar	Wexford	Saint George's Channel			4	0		52°12′10″N 6°12′26″W	T2207		1166860
Saltee Island Great	An Sailte Mór	Wexford	Saltee Islands	216	58	0	0		52°7′N 6°36′W	X9597		1166651
Bannow Island	Oileán Bhanú	Wexford	Bannow Bay	144	81	24	0	Road (no longer an island)		S819078		53760
Fota Island or Foaty	Fóite	Cork	Cork Harbour	767	30	209		Rail and road bridges (no longer an island)	51°53′57″N 8°17′53″W	W7072		1166136
Great Island	an tOileán Mór	Cork	Cork Harbour	6115	91	9424	>12000	Rail and road bridges via Fota I; car ferry to Passage West	51°52′N 8°17′W	W8069		1166543
Rocky Island	an tOileán Carraigeach	Cork	Cork Harbour	3		3		Road bridge	51°50′N 8°18′W	W792649		9407
Haulbowline Island	Inis Sionnach	Cork	Cork Harbour	86	20	222	148	Road bridge via Rocky Island	51°50′30″N 8°18′0″W	W792654		1410428
Spike Island	Inis Píc	Cork	Cork Harbour	98	24	202	0		51°50′N 8°17′W	W8065		1166269
Inchydoney	Oileán Inse Duine	Cork	Clonakilty Harbour	475	63	235	247	Road causeways (no longer an island)	51°36′7″N 8°52′34″W	W4039		1166540
Rabbit Island	Oileán Bhríde	Cork	Squince Harbour	18	19	17	0	None		W221315		13263
Fastnet Rock	Carraig Aonair	Cork	Atlantic Ocean		24	0	0		51°23′3″N 9°36′1″W	V8816		1165639
Cape Clear Island	Cléire	Cork	Carbery Islands	1502	160 (Killickaforavane)	1052	110	Passenger ferries (Baltimore; Schull, seasonal)	51°26′N 9°30′W	V9521		543
Sherkin Island	Inis Arcáin	Cork	Carbery Islands	1248	101 (Slievemore)	1131	110	Passenger ferry from Baltimore	51°28′N 9°25′W	W0225		13016
Spanish Island		Cork	Carbery Islands	134	34	26	0	None		W033275		13005
Ringarogy Island	Rinn Ghearróige	Cork	Carbery Islands	951	44	597	88	Road bridge		W0528		1166618
Inishbeg	Inis Beag	Cork	Carbery Islands	370	37	335	23	Road bridge		W0631		13298
Mannin Island	Manainn	Cork	Roaringwater Bay	14	18	4	0	None		W016325		13298
Heir Island, Hare Island, or Inishodriscol	Inis Uí Drisceoil	Cork	Carbery Islands	380	26	358	29	Passenger ferry (Baltimore–Schull; seasonal)	51°29′29″N 9°26′47″W	V9928		129542
Calf Islands	Na Laonna	Cork	Carbery Islands	77 (East); 62 (Middle); 63 (West)	22 (East); 14 (Middle); 28 (West)	19 (East) 39 (Middle) 21 (West)	0			V9626		1166289
Skeam East	Inis Céime Thoir	Cork	Carbery Islands	50	19	29	0	None		W0029		12938
Skeam West	Inis Céime Thiar	Cork	Carbery Islands	31	17	22	0	None		V987288		12939
Horse Island	Oileán an Chapaill	Cork	Carbery Islands	154	39	137	1			V980301		13378
Castle Island	Oileán an Chaisleáin	Cork	Carbery Islands	122	36	92	0			V957294		13369
Long Island	Inis Fada	Cork	Carbery Islands	341	31	336	17			V9228		13528
Whiddy Island	Faoide	Cork	Bantry Bay	1001	50	729	31	Seasonal passenger ferry to Bantry	51°42′N 9°30′W	V9650		8648
Chapel Island		Cork	Bantry Bay	16	22	4			51°42′N 9°30′W	V982498		8636
Ilnacullin, Garinish, or Garnish	Garinis	Cork	Bantry Bay	36	34	13	0		51°44′11″N 9°32′28″W	V934548		8530
Roancarrigmore	Róncharraig Mhór	Cork	Bantry Bay	3	6	0	0		51°39′10″N 9°44′50″W	V791460		8731
Dinish Island	Duínis	Cork	Bantry Bay	45	40	13	0	Road bridge		V684455		8805
Bere Island or Bear Island	an tOileán Mór	Cork	Bantry Bay	4372	273 (Knockanallig)	2108	187	Car ferries from Castletownbere and Beal Lough	51°38′N 9°53′W	V7044		1166542
Dursey Island	Oileán Baoi	Cork	Atlantic Ocean	1403	252	198	3	aerial tramway	51°36′N 10°12′W	V4841		8835
Inishfarnard	Inis Fearn Ard	Cork	Coulagh Bay	64	44	30	0		51°42′38.4″N 10°1′32.2″W	V604528		8787
Ormond's Island	Oileán Urumhan	Kerry	Kenmare River	20	10	0		Causeway at low tide	51°49′35″N 09°44′52″W	V792653		22944
Dinish Island	Duínis	Kerry	Kenmare River	25	11	11	0		51°50′50″N 09°39′12″W	V859673		22930
Dunkerron Island East	Oileán Dhún Ciaráin Thoir	Kerry	Kenmare River	22	5	15 (Note: Combined total of Dunkerron Island East and Dunkerron Island West.)	0	None (Note: Dunkerron Island East and West are connected at low tide.)		V876692		23121
Dunkerron Island West	Oileán Dhún Ciaráin Thiar	Kerry	Kenmare River	30	5	15	0	None		V869691		23122
Cappanacush Island (Note: Cappanacush is the largest of the Greenane Islands. It is listed separately and its area and population are excluded from the totals. It constitutes a separate townland.)	Oileán an Tí	Kerry	Kenmare River	19	11	8	0	None		V854690		22947
Garinish Island	Garinis	Kerry	Kenmare River	57				None	51°48′17″N 09°53′57″W	V6892763122		22889
Greenane Islands	Oileáin an Ghrianáin	Kerry	Kenmare River	22	5	6	0	None		V853692		23022
Rossmore Island	an Ros Mór	Kerry	Kenmare River	319	32	0 (Note: 170 in 1851)	15	Road bridge	51°49′35″N 09°48′12″W	V758651		23166
Rossdohan Island	Oileán Ros Dochan	Kerry	Kenmare River	134	35	(Note: Not enumerated separately from Rossdoohan townland on the mainland; combined population 163.)	0	Road bridge	51°48′10″N 09°51′55″W	V712627		23165
Sherky Island	Oileán Seirce	Kerry	Kenmare River	82	36	9	0	None	51°47′24″N 09°53′58″W	V686612		22909
Deenish Island	Duínis	Kerry	Atlantic Ocean	122	144	0	0		51°44′13″N 10°13′09″W	V466560		22214
Scariff Island	an Scairbh	Kerry	Atlantic Ocean	366	252	0	0		51°43′47″N 10°14′53″W	V445555		22224
Puffin Island	Oileán na gCánóg	Kerry	Atlantic Ocean	125	159	0	0		51°50′N 10°25′W	V3468		1166547
Little Skellig or Skellig Rock Little	Sceilg Beag	Kerry	Skellig Islands	17	134	0	0		51°46′N 10°32′W	V270618		22406
Skellig Michael or Skellig Rock Great	Sceilg Mhichíl	Kerry	Skellig Islands	44	186	0 (Note: 11 in 1911)	0		51°46′N 10°32′W	V2561		22405
Valentia Island or Valencia Island	Dairbhre	Kerry	Atlantic Ocean	6371	266 (Geokaun)	2886	658	Road bridge, and ferry	51°54′N 10°21′W	V3876		22439
Beginish Island	Beag Inis	Kerry	Valentia Harbour	159	63		0	Ferry	51.93°N 10.30°W			22439
Church Island	Oileán an Teampaill	Kerry	Valentia Harbour	1	4	0	0		51.937°N 10.283°W			101097
Lamb Island	Oileán na nUan	Kerry	Valentia Harbour	5	23	0	0		51.94°N 10.29°W			22156
Beginish	Beiginis	Kerry	Blasket Islands	32	14	84	0		52°6′56″N 10°30′26″W	V263988		22146
Great Blasket Island	an Blascaod Mór	Kerry	Blasket Islands	1060	292 (Croaghmore)	153	0		52°6′N 10°32′W	V259963		22578
Inishnabro	Inis na Bró	Kerry	Blasket Islands	102	175	0	0		52°3′28″N 10°36′32″W	V2193		22580
Inishvickillane	Inis Mhic Aoibhleáin	Kerry	Blasket Islands	171	135	3	0		52°2′37″N 10°36′30″W	V2191		22582
Tearaght Island	an Tiaracht	Kerry	Blasket Islands	47	183	0 (Note: 13 in 1881)	0		52°4′36″N 10°39′30″W	V179948		22583
Inishtooskert	Inis Tuaisceart	Kerry	Blasket Islands	186	172	0	0		52°7′50″N 10°34′42″W	Q2301		22581
Magharee Islands or the Seven Hogs	Oileáin an Mhachaire	Kerry	Atlantic Ocean	32 (Illauntannig), 29 (Illaunimmil), 13 (Inishtooshkert), 9 (Gurrig), 6 (Reennafardarrig), 5 (Illaunboe)	23 (Gurrig), 16 (Inishtooshkert), 12 (Illaunboe), 15 (Reennafardarrig), 15 (Illauntannig), 22 (Illaunimmil)	0	0		52°19′N 10°2′W	Q6022		1166527
Fenit Island	an Fhianait	Kerry	Tralee Bay	439	12	315		Track (tombolo)	52°17′N 9°52′W	Q720174		24367
Carrig Island	Oileán na Carraige	Kerry	Shannon Estuary	231	6	105	4	Road bridge	52°37′17.59″N 9°4′15.74″W	Q985481		23885
Tarbert Island	Oileán Thairbirt	Kerry	Shannon Estuary	63	20	134	2	Roads (no longer an island)	52°34′21″N 9°22′30″W	R075494		24189
Foynes Island	Oileán Fainge	Limerick	Shannon Estuary	294	60	83	3		52°37′21.8″N 9°6′45.1″W	R2553		1166539
Aughinish	Eachinis	Limerick	Shannon Estuary	1066	21	140		Road bridges	52°37′17.59″N 9°4′15.74″W	R2853		1166075
Green Island	Oileán Uí Uainín	Clare	Shannon Estuary	15	7	9	0		52°40′56.85″N 8°55′13.63″W	R457591		7410
Dernish Island		Clare	Shannon Estuary	8	14	11		Road (no longer an island)	52°40′56.85″N 8°55′13.63″W	R378595		104097
Inishmacnaghtan	Inis Mhic Neachtain	Clare	Fergus Estuary	285	24	12		Road	52°42′28″N 8°57′2.65″W	R359623		6141
Feenish	Fínis	Clare	Fergus Estuary	177	31	19			52°42′21.64″N 8°58′21.75″W	R343620		6139
Deenish Island	(Note: Duínis on OSI 1:50,000 map)	Clare	Fergus Estuary	44	28	13			52°42′59.83″N 8°57′53.94″W	R351631		6153
Horse Island		Clare	Fergus Estuary	34	8	13			52°44′47.04″N 9°1′47.54″W	R301667		7021
Inishmore or Deer Island	Inis Mór	Clare	Fergus Estuary	444	36	133	0	None	52°42′51.13″N 9°2′4.73″W	R300630		6879
Coney Island	Oileán na gCoiníní	Clare	Fergus Estuary	245	44	145	0	None	52°42′38.03″N 9°0′28.32″W	R321626		6923
Inishmacowney	Inis Mhic Uaithne	Clare	Fergus Estuary	225	≥20 (Note: The maximum spot height of 24 feet on the 6" map is incompatible with the 20-metre contour line present on the 1:50,000 map.)	142	0	None	52°41′2.66″N 9°2′53.57″W	R290596		6929
Canon Island	Oileán na gCanánach	Clare	Shannon Estuary	271	28	54	0		52°40′N 9°23′W	R2959		1166545
Inishloe	Inis Lua	Clare	Shannon Estuary	131	13	114	0		52°40′38.17″N 9°1′14.67″W	R310588		6969
Inishtubbrid	Inis Tiobrad	Clare	Shannon Estuary	85	33	0	0	None	52°40′8.05″N 9°3′57.53″W	R279579		6971
Inishcorker	Inis Corcair	Clare	Shannon Estuary	207	31	7	0	Road bridge	52°40′38.17″N 9°1′14.67″W	R264579		6968
Inishbig, or Hog Island	(Note: Inis Bhig on OSI 1:50,000 map)	Clare	Shannon Estuary	43	14	8			52°37′13.59″N 9°30′0.4″W	Q9752		7205
Scattery Island	Inis Cathaigh	Clare	Shannon Estuary	179	14	65	0		52°37′21.8″N 9°6′45.1″W	Q9752		7214
Mutton Island	Oileán Caorach	Clare	Atlantic Ocean	159	28	0	0	None	52°48′45.11″N 9°31′26.76″W	Q9775		1166533
Aughinish	Eachinis	Clare	Galway Bay	369	23	342	52	Road (tombolo)	53°5′24″N 9°2′24″W	M2813		1166074
Inisheer or Inishere	Inis Oírr	Galway	Aran Islands	1400	57	456	343	Air from Inverin; passenger ferries from Rossaveal, and seasonally from Galway and Roadford near Doolin	53°3′29″N 9°31′39″W	L9802		18684
Inishmaan	Inis Meáin	Galway	Aran Islands	2252	79	473	184	Air from Inverin; passenger ferries from Rossaveal, and seasonally from Galway and Roadford near Doolin	53°5′N 9°35′W	L9405		937
Inishmore	Árainn	Galway	Aran Islands	7635	123	2592	820	Air from Inverin; passenger ferries from Rossaveal, and seasonally from Galway and Roadford near Doolin	53°7′25″N 9°43′39″W	L8509		938
Brannock Island East	Árainn	Galway	Aran Islands						53°8′14.66″N 9°49′49.49″W			
Brannock Island Middle	Árainn	Galway	Aran Islands						53°8′26.3″N 9°50′29.97″W			
Brannock Island South	Árainn	Galway	Aran Islands						53°8′29.45″N 9°50′53.76″W			
Brannock Island	Árainn	Galway	Aran Islands						53°8′40.57″N 9°50′23.48″W			
Rock Island	Árainn	Galway	Aran Islands						53°8′50.39″N 9°51′26.83″W			
Island Eddy	Oileán Eide	Galway	Galway Bay	138	8	125	2	None	53°12′N 8°59′W	M339164		18613
Tawin East	Tamhain Thoir	Galway	Galway Bay	<179 (Note: Tawin Island comprise the townland of Tawin West (218 acres (88 hectares), 108 people) and part of the townland of Tawin East (179 acres (72 hectares), 193 people). Tawin East Island comprises the balance of the townland of Tawin East.)		≤193		Road	53°13′10.43″N 9°0′52.29″W	M3219		1166796
Tawin Island	Tamhain	Galway	Galway Bay	>218	6	≥108		Road via Tawin East	53°13′7.89″N 9°2′12.57″W	M3119		18504
Rossroe Island	An Ros	Galway	Greatman's Bay	58	14	7	12	Road bridge	53°17′11.83″N 9°36′18.28″W	L928275		20704
Inchamakinna	Inis Mhic Cionaith	Galway	Greatman's Bay	109	18	41	0	None		L920267		20702
Annaghvaan	Eanach Mheáin	Galway	Gorumna group	311	15	125	140	Road bridge	53°18′51.17″N 9°38′26.2″W	L9131		20803
Inishlusk	Inis Loiscthe	Galway	Gorumna group	13	8	24				L898303		20814
Lettermore	Leitir Móir	Galway	Gorumna group	2254	117	844	542	Road bridge via Annaghvaan	53°17′51.72″N 9°40′4.46″W	L8829		20818
Gorumna	Garmna	Galway	Gorumna group	5871	53	1910	1044	Road bridge via Lettermore	53°15′0″N 9°40′48″W	L8824		1166158
Lettermullen or Lettermullan	Leitir Mealláin	Galway	Gorumna group	787	45	587	214	Road bridge via Gorumna	53°14′38″N 9°43′34″W	L8423		20728
Crappagh Island	an Cnapach	Galway	Gorumna group	118	16	53	0	Road bridge via Lettermullen	53°14′31.31″N 9°45′4.91″W	L8323		20720
Furnace Island	Fornais	Galway	Gorumna group	219	27	155	66	Road bridge via Lettermullen	53°15′18.27″N 9°44′32.47″W	L8424		20724
Inisherk	Inis Eirc	Galway	Gorumna group	64	27	49	0		53°14′58.12″N 9°45′10.17″W	L829235		20727
Dinish Island	Daighinis	Galway	Gorumna group	95	19	59	0		53°15′44.52″N 9°45′14.18″W	L828250		20721
Inishbarra	Inis Bearachain	Galway	Gorumna group	262	37	205	0			L8627		20813
Illauneeragh	an tOileán Iatharach	Galway	Gorumna group	90	21	15	0			L842270		20809
Inishtravin	Inis Treabhair	Galway	Kilkieran Bay	190	14	93	0	None		L885311		18158
Clynagh Island	Cladhnach	Galway	Camus Bay	103	15	0	0	None		L953272		20706
Inisheltia	Inis Aillte	Galway	Camus Bay	67	12	0	0	None		L938347		20931
Roeillaun	Rua-oileáin	Galway	Kilkieran Bay	3		17	0	None		L681591		18341
Illaunmore	an tOileán Mór	Galway	Kilkieran Bay	96	14	89	1	None		L897349		1398093
Illauneeragh West	an tOileán Iarthach Thiar	Galway	Kilkieran Bay	78	15	65	0			L886347		20928
Finish Island	Fínis	Galway	Maínis Bay	154	8	66	0	Tombolo		L7929		1166125
Rusheennacholla	Roisín an Chalaidh	Galway	Maínis Bay	79	10	53	12	Road		L776305		18278
Mweenish Island	Maínis	Galway	Maínis Bay	572	23	649	127	Road via Rusheennacholla	53°18′01″N 9°52′35″W	L7629		1166448
Masson Island or Mason Island	Oileán Máisean	Galway	Atlantic Ocean	92	14	98	0			L7429		1166541
St Macdara's Island	Cruach na Cara	Galway	Atlantic Ocean	61	27	9	0			L719302		18280
Croaghnakeela Island	Cruach na Caoile	Galway	Atlantic Ocean	141	63	0	0			L6933		1165930
Freaghillaun	Fraochoileán	Galway	Atlantic Ocean	39	30					L732351		18262
Illaungorm North	An tOileán Gorm Thuaidh	Galway	Bertraghboy Bay	33	5	3	0	None		L7856639789		18313
Inishnee	Inis Ní	Galway	Bertraghboy Bay	856	48	455	49	Road	53°23′56″N 9°53′49″W	L7441		18353
Inishlackan	Inis Leacan	Galway	Gorteen Bay	129	13	126	0			L717375		18352
Inishdawros	Inis Damhraí	Galway	Ballyconneely Bay	22	3	8	0	None		L642409		18090
Illaunamid	Oileán Imill	Galway	Atlantic Ocean	29	27	30	0			L517410		18192
Turbot Island, Talbot Island, or Inish Toirbirt	Tairbeart	Galway	Atlantic Ocean	148	13	146	2	None	53°30′2.63″N 10°8′59.42″W	L574522		18142
Inishturk or Inishturk South	Inis Toirc Theas	Galway	Atlantic Ocean	133	37	84	0	None	53°30′32″N 10°8′59″W	L5753		1166271
Omey Island	Iomaí	Galway	Atlantic Ocean	522	28	397	5		53°32′7″N 10°9′27″W	L5755		1166277
Cruagh Island	an Chruach	Galway	Atlantic Ocean	83	62	0	0			L5355		18367
High Island	Ardoileán	Galway	Atlantic Ocean	82	63	0	0		53°32′47″N 10°15′25″W	L5057		18376
Inishbofin	Inis Bó Finne	Galway	Atlantic Ocean	3151	89	1404	184	Passenger ferry from Cleggan	53°37′N 10°12′W	L5565		18238
Inishlyon	Inis Laighean	Galway	Atlantic Ocean	75	43	0	0			L566646		18241
Inishark or Inishshark	Inis Airc	Galway	Atlantic Ocean	581	100	208	0		53°36′42″N 10°16′58″W	L5067		1166239
Davillaun	Damhoileán	Galway	Inishbofin group	60	28	0	0			L587663		18234
Crump Island	Oileán Dá Chruinne	Galway	Atlantic Ocean	63	25	16	0			L6865		18144
Inishturk	Inis Toirc	Mayo	Atlantic Ocean	1446	191	577	56	Passenger ferry from Roonah Quay, beyond Louisburgh	53°42′5″N 10°6′30″W	L6174		1375327
Caher Island	Oileán na Cathrach	Mayo	Atlantic Ocean	128	61	0	0		53°43′3″N 10°1′38″W	L6676		1166544
Clare Island	Cliara	Mayo	Clew Bay	3949	462 (Knockmore)	1615	138	Passenger ferry from Roonah Quay, beyond Louisburgh	53°48′18″N 9°59′37″W	L6885		36982
Dorinish (Dorinish More and Dorinish Beg)	Deoirinis	Mayo	Clew Bay	15 (Note: Excluding the tombolo linking Dorinish More and Dorinish Beg)	25	13	0		53°48′45″N 9°40′18″W	L900858		37268
Inisheeny	Inis Aonaigh	Mayo	Westport Bay	26	22	36				L920845		37323
Inishraher	Inis Raithir	Mayo	Westport Bay	27	33	25	0			L925852		37291
Annagh Islands		Mayo	Westport Bay	48 (East); 12 (Middle); 17 (West)	9 (East); 6 (West)	33 (total)				L948833		114009
Illanataggart	Oileán an tSagairt	Mayo	Clew Bay	30	28	33	0			L928868		37275
Crovinish	Croibhinis	Mayo	Dorinish Harbour	29	23	32				L918866		37260
Inishlyre	Inis Ladhair	Mayo	Dorinish Harbour	52	26	113	3			L912873		37288
Inishgort	Inis Goirt	Mayo	Clew Bay	28	29	32	0			L902879		37281
Collanmore Island or Collan More Island	Collainn Mhór	Mayo	Clew Bay	197	53	213	5			L920882		37253
Clynish	Claidhnis	Mayo	Clew Bay	80	42	87	3			L923894		37251
Island More	an tOileán Mór	Mayo	Clew Bay	77	42	88	3	(Note: Island More and Knockycahillaun are now connected;)		L903893		37293
Knockycahillaun	Cnoc Uí Chathaláin	Mayo	Clew Bay	34	36	41	0	None		L910896		37298
Derrinish	Dairinis	Mayo	Newport Bay	30	21	40				L913902		37262
Inishbee		Mayo	Newport Bay	38	29	20				L901902		37279
Inishgowla	Inis Gabhla	Mayo	Newport Bay	32	28	52				L911911		37282
Inishoo	Inis Uamha	Mayo	Newport Bay	17	29	29				L901911		37290
Inishnakillew	Inis na Coilleadh	Mayo	Newport Bay	59	27	126	5	Causeway		L937902		37289
Inishcottle	Inis Cotail	Mayo	Newport Bay	24	26	40	3	Causeway via Inishnakillew		L928905		37280
Inishturk	Inis Toirc	Mayo	Newport Bay	59	51	577	56			L940909		37292
Inishdaff	Inis Damh	Mayo	Newport Bay	33	31	44				L948914		37099
Rosbarnagh Island	Oileán Ros Bairneach	Mayo	Newport Bay	53	37	42		Road bridge		L953926		37089
Inishturlin		Mayo	Newport Bay	21	27	25				L947931		37079
Rosmore Island	An Ros Mór	Mayo	Newport Bay	104 (Note: Comprising townlands of Rosmore (78 acres (32 hectares), 90 people) and Lisduff (27 acre, 43 people))	28	133		Road bridge		L961942		37436
Rosturk Island	Ros Toirc	Mayo	Newport Bay	34	24	64		Connected at low tide		L913946		37494
Inishquirk	Inis Coirce	Mayo	Newport Bay	28	44	37				L904943		37472
Inishtubbrid		Mayo	Newport Bay	37	28	42				L897947		37473
Inishnacross	Inis na Croise	Mayo	Newport Bay	26	36	27				L888941		37471
Inishbobunnan		Mayo	Newport Bay	24	31	13				L889954		37459
Inishgowla		Mayo	Newport Bay	32	32	28				L887950		37467
Inishilra		Mayo	Newport Bay	8	18	12				L895939		37468
Inishkeel	Inis Caol	Mayo	Newport Bay	30	27	23				L878953		37469
Inisherkin	Inis Earcáin	Mayo	Newport Bay	31	30	28				L878945		37466
Inishcooa		Mayo	Newport Bay	21	27	6				L876938		37461
Moynish More	Maínis Mór	Mayo	Clew Bay	62	37	99				L864945		37481
Achill Island	Acaill	Mayo	Atlantic Ocean	35283	688 (Croaghaun)	4901	2345	Road bridge (Michael Davitt Bridge)	54°N 10°W	F6803		1165355
Achillbeg	Acaill Bheag	Mayo	Atlantic Ocean	331	110	178	1		53°51′N 9°57′W	L7292		1165356
Annagh Island	Oileán an Eanaigh	Mayo	Blacksod Bay	627	23	0 (Note: 18 in 1851)	0			F778052		36937
Inishbiggle	Inis Bigil	Mayo	Blacksod Bay	637	34	67	12		53°59′45″N 9°54′15″W	F7507		36863
Barranagh Island	Oileán Bearanach	Mayo	Elly Bay	63	7	0	0	Tombolo		F667258		35255
Duvillaun Beg	Dubhoileán Beag	Mayo	Atlantic Ocean	25	14	0	0			F5916		35271
Duvillaun More	Dubhoileán Mór	Mayo	Atlantic Ocean	155	60	31	0			F5816		35272
Inishkea South	Inis Gé Theas	Mayo	Inishkea Islands	344	72 (Knocknaskea)	62	0			F5420		35278
Inishkea North	Inis Gé Thuaidh	Mayo	Inishkea Islands	464	24	155	0			F5623		35277
Inishglora	Inis Gluaire	Mayo	Atlantic Ocean	37	22	16	0		54°12′31″N 10°7′38″W	F6131		1166254
Eagle Island	Oileán sa Tuaidh	Mayo	Atlantic Ocean	14	60	15	0			F6339		1166546
Kid Island	Oileán Mionnán	Mayo	Broadhaven Bay	25	86	0	0			F787436		35405
Illanmaster	Oileán Máistir	Mayo	Atlantic Ocean	7	108	0	0	None	54°20′N 9°38′W	F934432		1399573
Bartragh Island	an Bheartrach	Mayo	Killala Bay	316	26	28	0	None	54°12′50″N 9°9′47″W	G245300		34513
Inishmulclohy or Coney Island	Inis Uí Mhaolchluiche	Sligo	Sligo Harbour	388	13	124	1	Connected by strand at low tide		G617388		45348
Oyster Island	Inis Rórais	Sligo	Sligo Harbour	33	14	28	0			G631393		45365
Inishmurray	Inis Muirígh	Sligo	Donegal Bay	209	23	0	0		54°26′N 8°40′W	G572539		45211
Conor's Island	Oileán Chonchúir	Sligo	Donegal Bay	111	16	15	0	Road (no longer an island)		F654515		45206
Dernish	Dairinis	Sligo	Donegal Bay	103	32	42	0			G677528		45207
Inishpat		Donegal	Donegal Harbour	17	25	7				F591874		14142
Rooney's Island	Oileán Uí Ruanaí	Donegal	Donegal Harbour	34	32	6				F591875		14297
Rotten Island	an tOileán Bréan	Donegal	Killybegs Harbour	1		11	0		54°36′52.13″N 8°26′25.55″W	F715742		14875
Rathlin O'Birne Island	Reachlainn Uí Bhirn	Donegal	Atlantic Ocean	50 (Note: Excluding the 10 acres (4.0 hectares) of Kinkeel, connected at low tide.)	26	0	0			G4680		1166602
Inishkeel	Inis Caoil	Donegal	Gweebarra Bay	81	19	16	0	Connected by strand at low tide	54°50′51″N 8°27′22″W	B7000		1166244
Inishkeeragh	Inis Caorach	Donegal	Atlantic Ocean	47	6	52	0			B683123		14535
Inishfree Upper	Inis Fraoigh	Donegal	Dunglow Bay	541	14	137	9		54°57′20″N 8°26′40″W	B715120		14945
Inishal	Inis Saille	Donegal	Dunglow Bay	71	6	43				B727113		14943
Rutland Island or Inishmacadurn	Inis Mhic an Doirn	Donegal	Atlantic Ocean	313	≥20	125	12		54°58′41″N 8°27′27″W	B707142		15002
Inishcoo	Inis Cú	Donegal	Atlantic Ocean	109	15		0	None (Note: There is a foot bridge between Eighter and Inishcoo.)	54°59′13″N 8°27′50″W	B706156		15000
Eighter Island	an tÍochtar	Donegal	Atlantic Ocean	60	24	59	0	None	54°59′30″N 8°28′27″W	B698161		14997
Arranmore or Aran Island	Árainn Mhór	Donegal	Atlantic Ocean	4335	227	1431	478	Car ferry to Burtonport	54°59′22″N 8°31′51″W	B6616		14527
Cruit Island	an Chruit	Donegal	Rosses Bay	941	32	258	92	Road bridge	55°3′3″N 8°14′8″W	B7321		111107
Owey Island	Uaigh	Donegal	Rosses Bay	301	102	94	27		55°3′17″N 8°27′3″W	B712231		15013
Inishfree Lower	Inis Fraoigh	Donegal	Inishfree Bay	45	25	0	0			B756241		14514
Inishinny	Inis Sionnaigh	Donegal	Gweedore Bay	62	27	4	0			B785252		1390473
Gola Island	Gabhla	Donegal	Gweedore Bay	424	68	68	15		55°3′3″N 8°14′8″W	B7727		14467
Inishmeane	Inis Meáin	Donegal	Gweedore Bay	117	33	12	0		55°06′15.65″N 8°20′46.04″W	B785286		14495
Inishsirrer	Inis Oirthir	Donegal	Gweedore Bay	109	23	0 (Note: 30 in 1861)	0		55°07′04″N 8°20′36″W	B7830		1166267
Inishbofin	Inis Bó Finne	Donegal	Tory Sound	298	33	121	16		55°10′24″N 8°10′8″W	B889365		14448
Inishdooey	Oileán Dúiche	Donegal	Tory Sound	87	38	9			55°11′24″N 8°9′50″W	B896383		14449
Tory Island	Toraigh	Donegal	Atlantic Ocean	785	83	399	141	Passenger ferries to Bunbeg and Meenlaragh near Falcarragh	55°15′45″N 8°13′0″W	B851465		14500
Island Roy	Oileán an Bhráighe	Donegal	Mulroy Bay	91	12	74	13	Road causeway		C133381		16063
Aughnish		Donegal	Lough Swilly	66	25	26	3	Road causeway		C252215		15974
Inch Island	an Inis	Donegal	Lough Swilly	3425	222	978	438	Road causeways	55°04′08″N 7°29′18″W	C3324		1166237
Inishtrahull	Inis Trá Tholl	Donegal	Atlantic Ocean	113	49	54	0		55°25′48″N 7°14′2″W	C4565		14546

== See also ==
- List of islands of County Mayo
