= Gortahork =

Village in County Donegal, Ireland

Gortahork Irish: Gort an Choirce
- Village
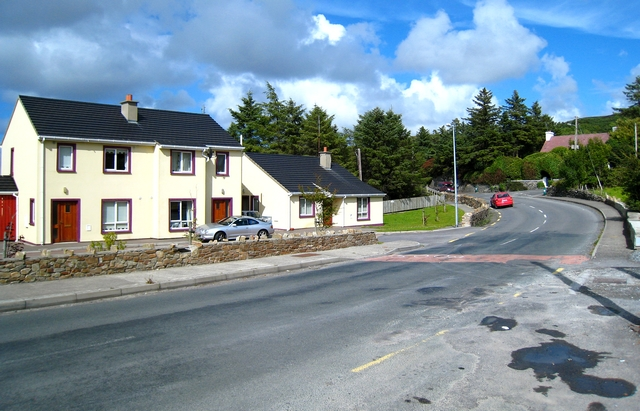
- Housing in Gortahork

- Location in Ireland
- Coordinates: 55°07′10″N 8°08′09″W
- Country: Ireland
- Province: Ulster
- County: County Donegal
- Barony: Kilmacrenan

Government
  - Dáil Éireann: Donegal

Population (2022)
  - Total: 375
- Area code: +00353 07491
- Irish Grid Reference: C055307
- Gort an Choirce is the only official name. The anglicised spelling Gortahork has no official status, but is still widely used.

Gort an Choirce or Gort a' Choirce (Irish: [ˌɡɔɾˠt̪ˠ ə ˈxɔɾʲcə]; meaning 'oat field'), anglicised as Gortahork, is a village and townland in the northwest of County Donegal, Ireland. It is a Gaeltacht community, where the Irish language is the main language spoken in the area. Along with Falcarragh, it forms part of the district known as Cloughaneely. The nearest town is Falcarragh, 3 km to the north-east.

== Irish language ==
According to the 2022 census the village population was 375, with about 30% of people speaking Irish on a daily basis outside the education system. This placed the village in 8th place for highest percentage of daily Irish speakers in Ireland.

== Name ==
The official name of the village and townland is Gort an Choirce (anglicised to Gortahork), meaning 'oat field'.

== History ==
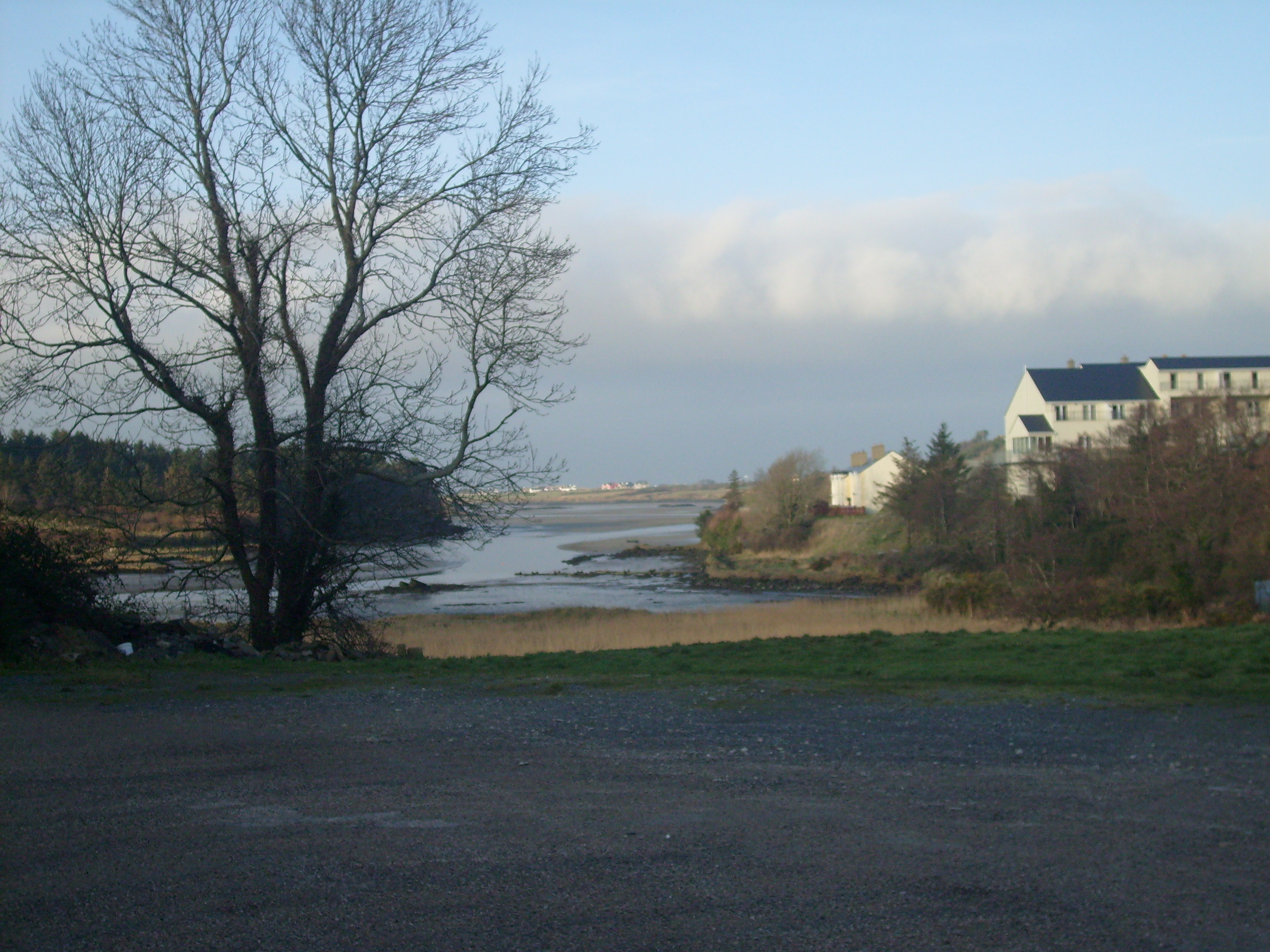
Creek at Gort a' Choirce

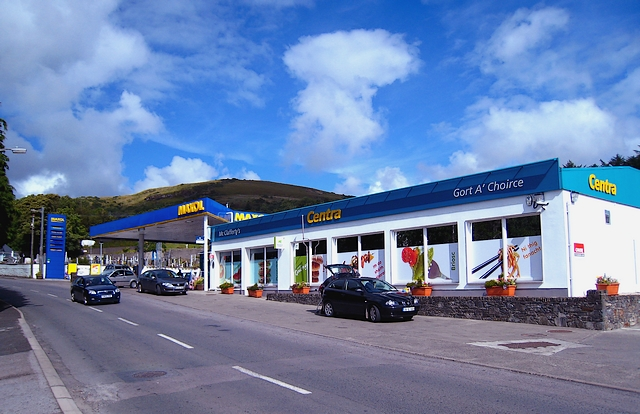
Local shop and filling station

Evidence of ancient habitation in the townland includes a number of ring forts and souterrains in the area.

The village has a history of local enterprise, shops, forges, hotels, post office halls, and other meeting places for the communities in the surrounding areas.

Charlie McGee from Inishbofin, an offshore island near Gort a' Choirce, is sometimes described as the first person to have been killed in the 1916 Easter Rising. He is buried in Gortahork.

In 2006, Coláiste Uladh (the Ulster College) celebrated its centenary. Among those who attended the college were Pádraig Pearse, Joseph Mary Plunkett and Roger Casement – three participants in the 1916 Rising.

== Amenities ==
There is a hotel on the main street called Óstan Loch Altan (Lake Altan Hotel), named after the lake at the foot of the northern slopes of Errigal.

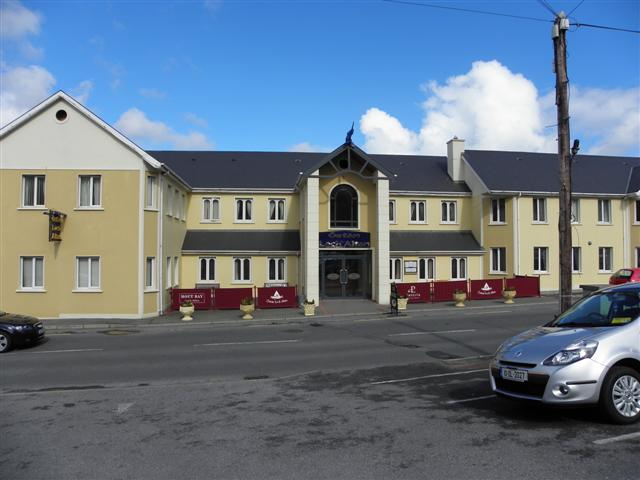
Óstan Loch Altan in 2011

The local Catholic church (known locally as 'the Chapel') for the parish of Gortahork is Teach Pobail Chríost Rí (Christ is King Church), located beside Óstan Loch Altan and across from Teach Bhillie pub.

== Community ==
The arts community in the area includes visual artists, poets, singers, musicians and others from or attracted to the area. Gort a' Choirce has been home to a documentary film festival which, in its first year, screened 30 films from 15 different countries.

Gortahork is mentioned in the opening lines of the Christy Moore song Lisdoonvarna.

The village is a base for wind surfers who come to Machaire Rabhartaigh Beach.

== Education ==
There is are two primary schools in the area, Scoil Naisiunta Gort An Choirce (Gortahork National School) in the village and Cnoc na Naomh (Hill of the Saints National School) in Derryconnor. Both are gaelscoils.

There is no secondary school in the area and pupils either attend Pobalscoil Gaoth Dobhair in Derrybeg or Pobalscoil Chloich Cheannfhaola in Falcarragh.

== Transport ==
The village is on the coastal N56 road which runs between Donegal town and Letterkenny.

The Falcarragh/Dungloe (route 966) TFI Local Link public bus route services the town, linking it to Falcarragh, Dungloe, Crolly, Magheroarty and the Gweedore area.

Several private bus services also service the town. These Patrick Gallagher Coaches, which provides routes from Crolly to Derry via Letterkenny, and another to Belfast via Letterkenny and Derry. John McGinley Coach Travel has a route to Dublin, Mangan Tours has a route from Meenlaragh to Letterkenny. Bus Feda operates 3 routes: a Donegal/Galway route, a college term service on a Friday to Limerick City, and a college term Sunday route with stops at University of Limerick, TUS Limerick Moylish Campus and Mary Immaculate College.

== Notable people ==
Natives include

- Cathal Ó Searcaigh, poet
- Micí Mac Gabhann, author of Irish language book Rotha Mór an tSaoil
- Breandán Mac Cnáimhsí, translator and RTÉ newsreader

Residents include

- Gerry Adams, former president of Sinn Féin.
- Phil Mac Giolla Bhain, journalist and writer
- Brian Ó Domhnaill, former Fianna Fáil politician and Independent politician.
