= Inis Bó Finne =

Inis Bó Finne may refer to:

- Inishbofin, County Donegal
- Inishbofin, County Galway
