= Deenish Island =

Island and townland in County Kerry, Ireland

Native name: Duínis
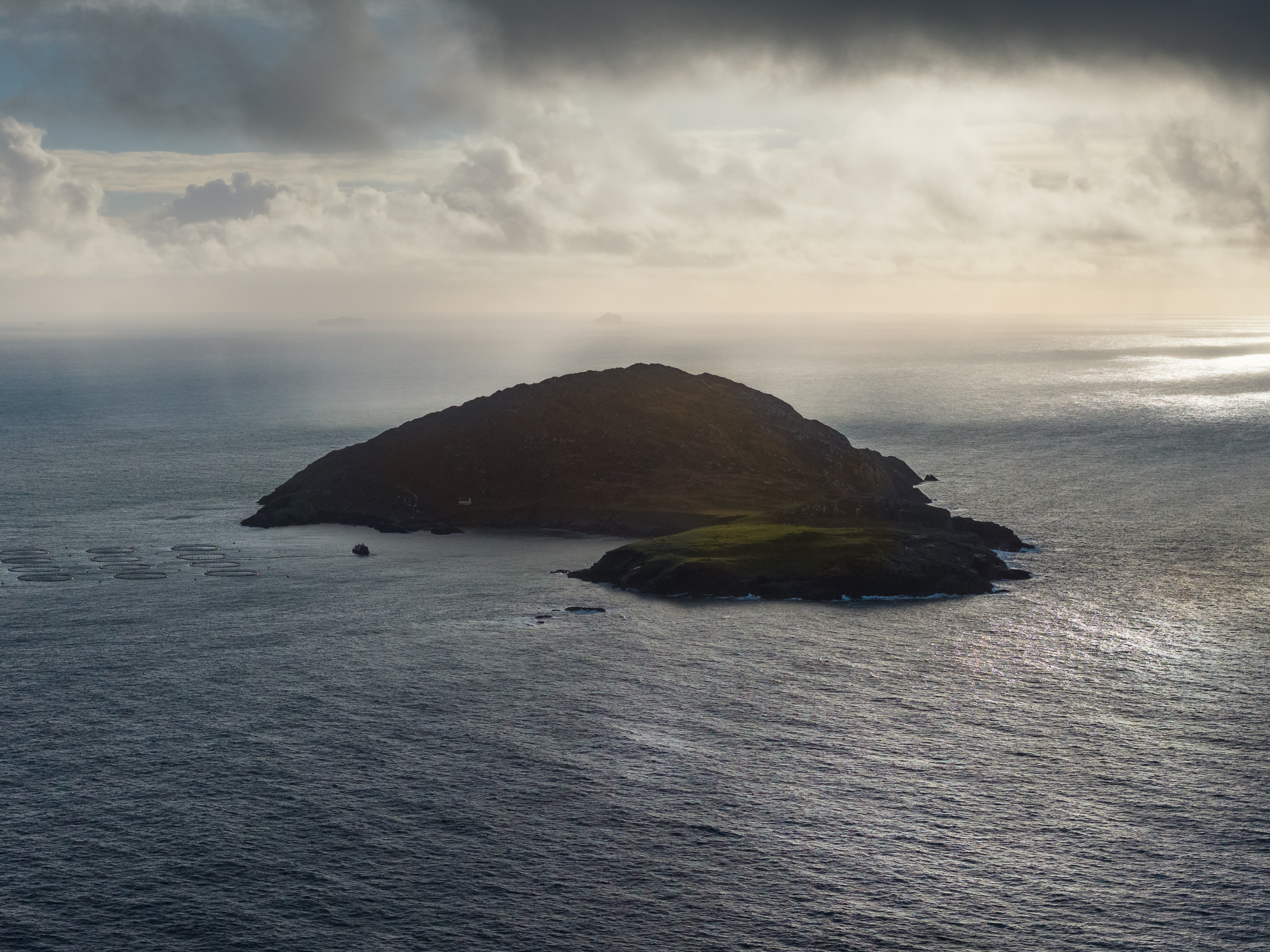
- Northern aerial view of Deenish Island

- Location within island of Ireland

Geography
- Location: Atlantic Ocean
- Coordinates: 51.7370°N 10.2203°W
- Area: 0.49 km^{2} (0.19 sq mi)
- Highest elevation: 144 m (472 ft)

Administration
- Ireland
- Province: Munster
- County: Kerry

Demographics
- Population: 0 (2011)
- Pop. density: 0/km^{2} (0/sq mi)

Deenish Island (Irish: Duínis) is an island of the Atlantic Ocean belonging to County Kerry, Ireland.

== Geography ==
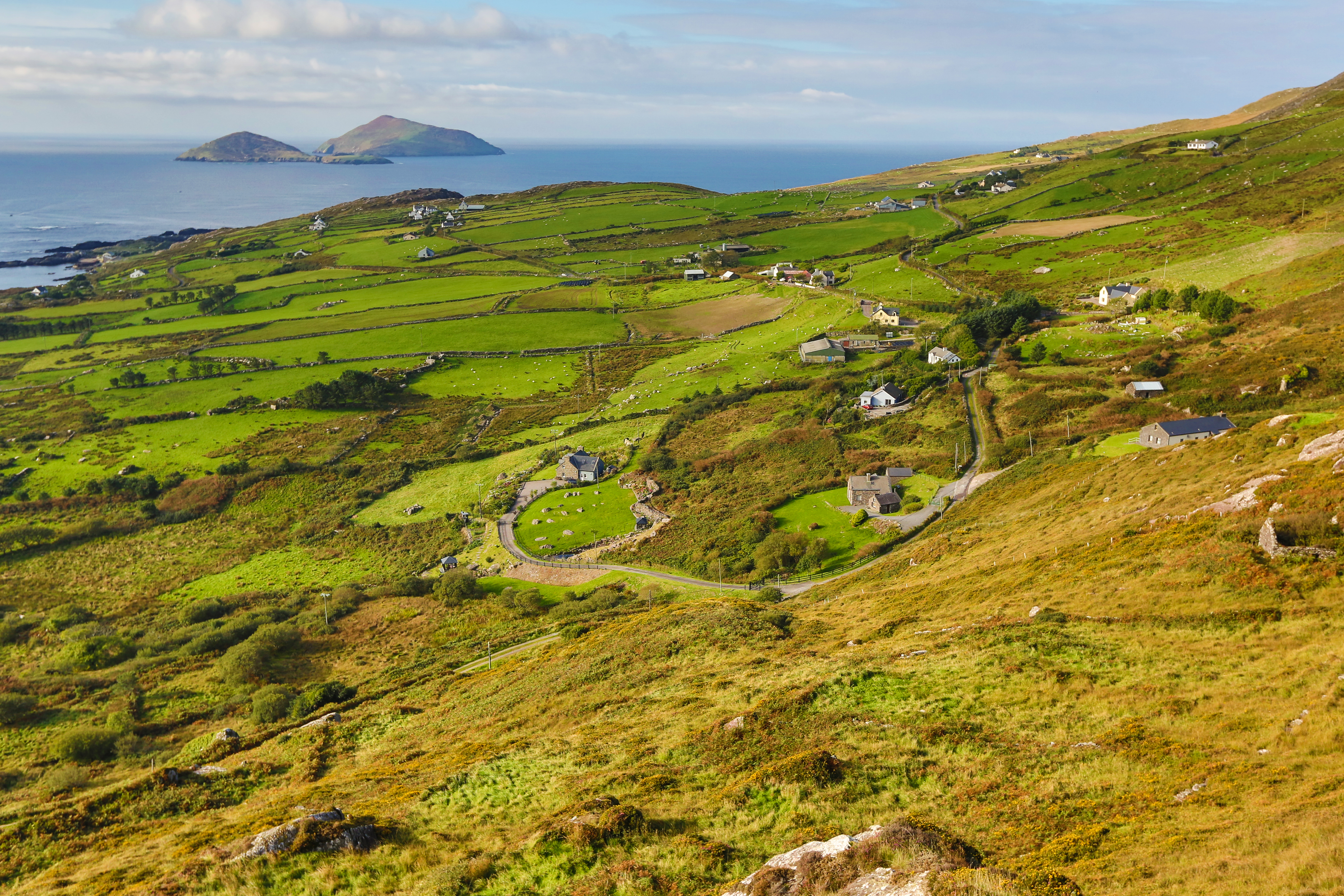
Deenish (left) and Scariff islands from the mainland

The island is 122 acres; its highest hill is at 144 m. It's located in the Atlantic Ocean at around 1 km from Scariff Island and 6.1 km from Hogs Head, on the mainland.

== History ==
In 1837 on Deenish (which at that time was called Dinish) resided three families who mainly lived on the cattle which grazed on the island. 1911 census still reported six people living on the island.

Historical population

Year	Pop.	±%
1841	11	—
1851	8	−27.3%
1861	7	−12.5%
1871	7	+0.0%
1881	7	+0.0%
1891	9	+28.6%
1901	9	+0.0%
1911	4	−55.6%

Year	Pop.	±%
1926	4	+0.0%
1936	8	+100.0%
1946	6	−25.0%
1951	5	−16.7%
1956	6	+20.0%
1961	10	+66.7%
1966	14	+40.0%
1971	6	−57.1%

Year	Pop.	±%
1979	5	−16.7%
1981	6	+20.0%
1986	6	+0.0%
1991	5	−16.7%
1996	0	−100.0%
2002	0	0.00%
2006	0	0.00%

Source: Central Statistics Office. "CNA17: Population by Off Shore Island, Sex and Year". CSO.ie.

== See also ==
- List of islands of Ireland
