= Illauneeragh West =

Island in County Galway, Ireland

Native name: An tOileán Iarthach Thiar
- Location within island of Ireland

Geography
- Location: Atlantic Ocean
- Coordinates: 53°21′07″N 9°40′21″W

Administration
- Ireland
- Province: Connacht
- County: Galway

Demographics
- Population: 0 (2006)

Illauneeragh (Gaeilge:An tOileán Iarthach Thiar) is an island in County Galway, Ireland which is connected to Illaunmore at low water.

Historical population

Year	Pop.	±%
1841	65	—
1851	67	+3.1%
1861	57	−14.9%
1871	65	+14.0%
1881	74	+13.8%
1891	53	−28.4%
1901	56	+5.7%
1911	46	−17.9%

Year	Pop.	±%
1926	49	+6.5%
1936	32	−34.7%
1946	19	−40.6%
1951	9	−52.6%
1956	3	−66.7%
1961	0	−100.0%
1966	0	0.00%
1971	0	0.00%

Year	Pop.	±%
1979	0	0.00%
1981	0	0.00%
1986	0	0.00%
1991	0	0.00%
1996	0	0.00%
2002	0	0.00%
2006	0	0.00%

Source: Central Statistics Office. "CNA17: Population by Off Shore Island, Sex and Year". CSO.ie.

== See also ==
- Illauneeragh
