= Daniel G. Caldwell =

American Civil War soldier (1842–1917)

- Born: June 1, 1842; Marble Hill, Pennsylvania, US
- Died: April 15, 1917 (aged 74); Philadelphia, Pennsylvania, US
- Military career
- Allegiance: United States of America
- Branch: United States Army; Union Army
- Service years: August 28, 1862 to July 14, 1865
- Rank: Sergeant
- Unit: 13th Regiment Pennsylvania Volunteer Cavalry - Company H
- Conflicts: Battle of Hatcher's Run
- Awards: Medal of Honor

Sergeant Daniel G. Caldwell (June 1, 1842 – April 15, 1917) was an American soldier who fought in the American Civil War. Caldwell received the country's highest award for bravery during combat, the Medal of Honor, for his action during the Battle of Hatcher's Run in Virginia on 6 February 1865. He was honored with the award on 25 February 1865.

== Biography ==
Caldwell was born in Marble Hill, Pennsylvania on 1 June 1842. He enlisted in the 13th Pennsylvania Cavalry on 28 August 1862. After earning the Medal of Honor he was promoted to 2nd lieutenant. He served until the end of the war when he was mustered out on 14 July 1865.

Caldwall died on 15 April 1917.

== Medal of Honor citation ==
In a mounted charge, dashed into center of the enemy's line and captured the colors of the 33rd North Carolina Infantry.

== See also ==
- List of American Civil War Medal of Honor recipients: A–F
