= Inishturk South =

Island in County Galway, Ireland

Inishturk
Native name: Inis Toirc
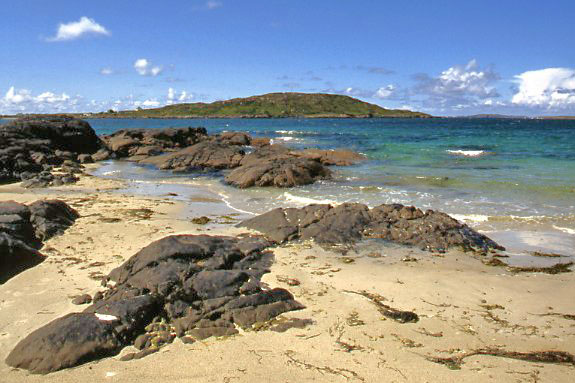
- Inishturk from a beach at Eyrephort

- Location within island of Ireland

Geography
- Location: Atlantic Ocean
- Coordinates: 53.5091°N 10.1498°W
- Area: 0.7055 km^{2} (0.2724 sq mi)

Administration
- Ireland
- Province: Connacht
- County: Galway

Demographics
- Population: 0 (2022)

Inishturk (Inis Toirc in Irish, meaning Wild Boar Island) is a small island and a townland of County Galway, in Ireland. The island is also referred as Inishturk South (Irish: Inis Toirc Theas) in order to tell it apart from the Inishturk island located in County Mayo.

== Geography ==
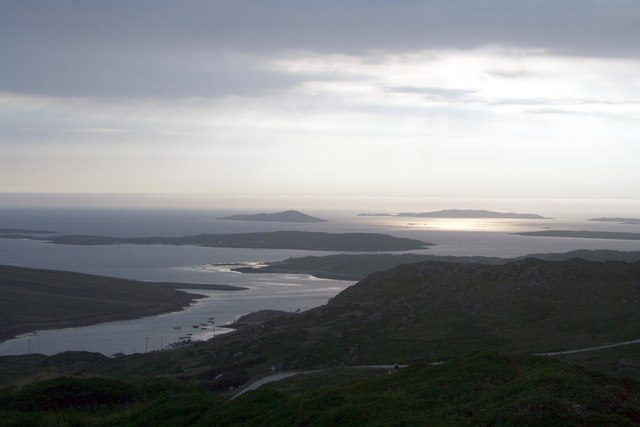
Turbot, Eesal and Inishturk islands from the Sky Road

Inisturk lies off the Irish coast not faraway from Clifden and Cleggan. It is located between Turbot (or Inishturbot, South) and Omey Island (North). On the hill topping the island stands a radio-TV mast. The easiest place to land on Inishturk is the SE part of the island.

== History ==
A small community used to live on the island up to the mid-20th century, but it later became uninhabited. At the end of the 20th century some old buildings were transformed into holiday houses.

=== Demographics ===
The table below shows data on Inisturk's population taken from Discover the Islands of Ireland (Alex Ritsema, Collins Press, 1999) and the census of Ireland.

Historical population

Year	Pop.	±%
1841	84	—
1851	97	+15.5%
1861	128	+32.0%
1871	92	−28.1%
1881	87	−5.4%
1891	84	−3.4%
1901	95	+13.1%
1911	96	+1.1%
1926	90	−6.2%

Year	Pop.	±%
1936	92	+2.2%
1946	80	−13.0%
1951	86	+7.5%
1956	76	−11.6%
1961	53	−30.3%
1966	47	−11.3%
1971	35	−25.5%
1979	0	−100.0%
1981	7	—

Year	Pop.	±%
1986	1	−85.7%
1991	0	−100.0%
1996	0	0.00%
2002	0	0.00%
2006	1	—
2011	1	+0.0%
2016	0	−100.0%
2022	0	0.00%

Source: Central Statistics Office. "CNA17: Population by Off Shore Island, Sex and Year". CSO.ie.

== See also ==
- List of islands of Ireland
