= Inishdooey =

Island of County Donegal, Ireland

Native name: Inis Dúiche / Oileán Dúiche
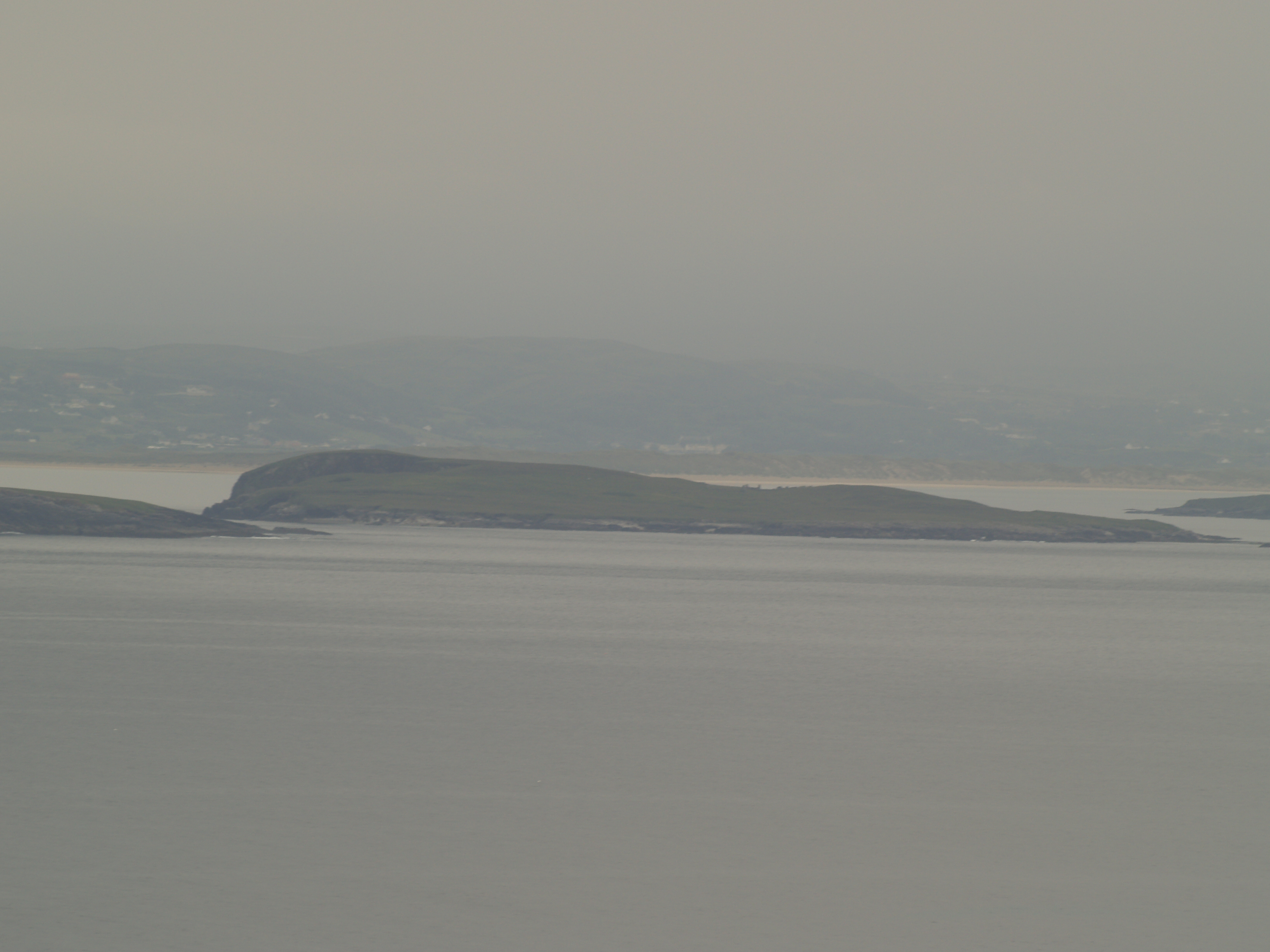
- Inishbofin island, part of Inishdooey visible on the left

- Location within island of Ireland

Geography
- Location: Atlantic Ocean
- Coordinates: 55.19°N 8.164°W

Administration
- Ireland
- Province: Ulster
- County: Donegal

Demographics
- Population: (0)

Inishdooey (Gaeilge: Inis Dúiche, although local Gaelic speakers know it as Oileán Dúiche, retaining the element ‘Inis’ only for the two nearby islands on either side of it) is a privately owned 96-acre island just off the north-west coast of County Donegal in Ulster, the northern province in Ireland. The island is situated 1 km north of Inishbofin, near Machaire Rabhartaigh (Magheroarty).
