= Scariff Island =

Island off the Kerry coast, Ireland

Native name: An Scairbh
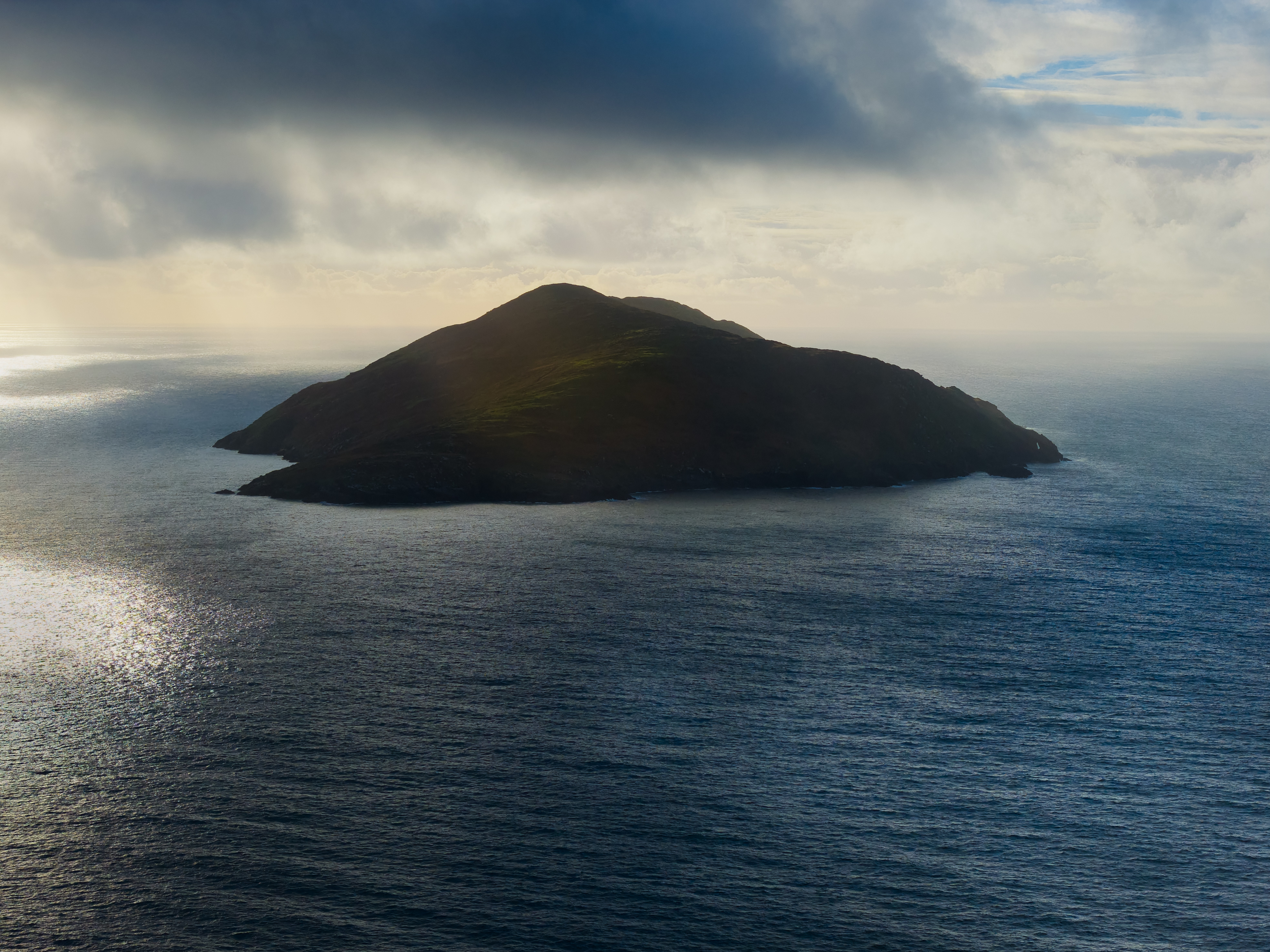
- North-eastern aerial view of the island

- Location within island of Ireland

Geography
- Location: Atlantic Ocean
- Coordinates: 51.7307°N 10.2502°W
- Area: 1.48 km^{2} (0.57 sq mi)
- Highest elevation: 252 m (827 ft)

Administration
- Ireland
- Province: Munster
- County: Kerry

Demographics
- Population: 0 (2011)
- Pop. density: 0/km^{2} (0/sq mi)

Scariff Island

Highest point
- Elevation: 252 m (827 ft)
- Prominence: 252 m (827 ft)
- Listing: Marilyn

Scariff Island (Irish: An Scairbh, meaning 'Rugged',) is an island of the Atlantic Ocean in County Kerry, Ireland.

== Geography ==
The island is 366 acres; its highest hill is at 252 m. It's located in the Atlantic Ocean at around 1 km from Deenish Island and 7 km from Hogs Head, on the mainland.

Deenish (left) and Scariff (right) at sunset

== History ==
In 1837 only one family lived on Scariff; their main work was to care the cattle which grazed on the island. On the summit of the hill there were remains of an ancient hermitage and, on the east side, ruins of a church. 1911 census does not report any inhabitant for Scariff Island.

== See also ==
- List of islands of Ireland
