= 13th Pennsylvania Cavalry Regiment =

Union Army infantry regiment

- Active: December 1861 to July 27, 1865
- Country: United States
- Allegiance: Union
- Branch: Cavalry
- Engagements: Second Battle of Winchester; Bristoe Campaign; Mine Run Campaign; Battle of the Wilderness; Battle of Spotsylvania Court House; Battle of Haw's Shop; Battle of Cold Harbor; Battle of Trevilian Station; Battle of Saint Mary's Church; Siege of Petersburg; First Battle of Deep Bottom; Second Battle of Ream's Station; Battle of Boydton Plank Road; Battle of Hatcher's Run

The 13th Pennsylvania Cavalry Regiment (117th Volunteers) was a cavalry regiment that served in the Union Army during the American Civil War.

== Service ==
Originally organized as the 116th Pennsylvania Volunteers, the "Irish Dragoons" were to be a squadron of cavalry commanded by Captain James A. Galligher, and attached to the New York-based "Irish Brigade." When President Lincoln issued manpower quotas to the several states, Pennsylvania requested their men be returned in order to help fill the quotas. A full regiment was raised, re-numbered as the 117th Pennsylvania Volunteer Regiment, aka the 13th regiment of Pennsylvania Cavalry. Originally recruited and organized at Philadelphia and Harrisburg, Pennsylvania beginning in December 1861, they were mustered in for three years service under the command of newly promoted Colonel James A. Galligher.

The regiment was attached to Defenses of Baltimore, VIII Corps, Middle Department, to September 1862. Defenses Upper Potomac, VIII Corps, to February 1863. Elliott's Brigade, Milroy's Command, Winchester, Virginia, VIII Corps, February 1863. 1st Brigade, 2nd Division, VIII Corps, to July 1863. 3rd Brigade, 2nd Division, Cavalry Corps, Army of the Potomac, to August 1863. 2nd Brigade, 2nd Division, Cavalry Corps, Army of the Potomac, to February 1865. (Served attached to IX Corps, Army of the Potomac, May 3–26, 1864.) Terry's Provisional Corps, Department of North Carolina, to March 1865. 3rd Brigade, Kilpatrick's 3rd Division, Cavalry Corps, Military Division of Mississippi, to July 1865.

The 13th Pennsylvania Cavalry mustered out in Raleigh, North Carolina, on July 14, 1865, and traveled by rail to Philadelphia, Pennsylvania, where they were discharged on July 27, 1865.

== Detailed service ==
Ordered to Baltimore, Maryland, April 1862. Duty in the defenses of Baltimore, Md., until September 24, 1862. Moved to Point of Rocks, Maryland, September 24, and guard duty on line of the Potomac River between Berlin and Edward's Ferry, and scouting in Loudoun and Jefferson Counties, Va., until February 1863. Ordered to join Milroy at Winchester, Va., February 3. Woodstock February 25. Strasburg Road and Woodstock February 26 (Companies G and L). Cedar Creek April 13. Reconnaissance toward Wardensville and Strasburg April 20. Operations in the Shenandoah Valley April 22–29. Fisher's Hill, Strasburg Road, April 22 and 26. Scout to Strasburg April 25–30. Strasburg April 28. Fairmont April 29. Scout in Hampshire County May 4–9. Operations about Front Royal Ford and Buck's Ford May 12–26. Piedmont Station May 16 (detachment). Middletown and Newtown June 12. Battle of Winchester June 13–15. Retreat to Harpers Ferry June 15, and duty there until June 30. Moved to Frederick, Md., then to Boonsboro July 8, and joined Cavalry Corps, Army of the Potomac. Scouting in Virginia until September. Oak Shade September 2. Hazel River September 4. Advance to the Rapidan September 13–17. Culpeper Court House September 13. Bristoe Campaign October 9–22. James City October 10. Near Warrenton October 11. Jeffersonton October 12. Warrenton or White Sulphur Springs October 12–13. Auburn and Bristoe October 14. St. Stephen's Church October 14. Advance to line of the Rappahannock November 7–8. Rappahannock Station November 7. Catlett's Station November 15. Mine Run Campaign November 26-December 2. New Hope Church November 27. Mine Run November 28–30. Scout from Vienna to White Plains December 28–31. Brentsville February 14, 1864. Near Sprigg's Ford February 28 (Company L). Near Greenwich March 6. Scout to Brentsville March 8. Scout to Greenwich March 9. Near Greenwich March 9. Scout to Greenwich March 11. Bristoe Station March 16. Scout to Aldie and Middleburg March 28–29. Bristoe Station April 9. Near Nokesville April 13. Near Milford April 15. Near Middletown April 24. Rapidan Campaign May–June. Battle of the Wilderness May 5–7. Spotsylvania Court House May 8–21; Strasburg May 12 (detachment). North Anna River May 23–26. Rejoined brigade May 26. Haw's Shop May 28. Old Church May 30. Cold Harbor May 31-June 1. Sumner's Upper Bridge June 2. About Cold Harbor June 2–7. Sheridan's Trevilian Raid June 7–24. Trevilian Station June 11–12. White House and St. Peter's Church June 21. Black Creek or Tunstall Station June 21. St. Mary's Church June 24. Charles City Cross Roads June 30. Proctor's Hill July 1. Warwick Swamp July 12. Demonstration north of James River at Deep Bottom July 27–29. Malvern Hill July 28. Warwick Swamp July 30. Demonstration north Of James River at Deep Bottom August 13–20. Gravel Hill August 14. White Oak Swamp August 14–15. Charles City Cross Roads August 16. Strawberry Plains August 16–18. Dinwiddie Road near Ream's Station August 23. Ream's Station August 25. Coggin's Point and Fort Powhatan September 16. Poplar Grove Church September 29-October 2. Wyatt's Farm September 29. Arthur's Swamp September 30-October 1. Stony Creek October 11–12. Boydton Plank Road October 27–28. Reconnaissance's toward Stony Creek November 7 and November 28. Stony Creek Station December 1. Reconnaissance to Hatcher's Run December 8–10. Hatcher's Run December 8–9. Dabney's Mills, Hatcher's Run, February 5–7, 1865. Rowanty Creek February 5. Ordered to Wilmington, N.C., February 17, arriving there March 6. Advance on Goldsboro March 6–21. Reported to Sherman at Fayetteville, N.C.. Occupation of Goldsboro March 21. Advance on Raleigh April 10–13. Near Raleigh April 12. Occupation of Raleigh April 13. Received surrender of Confederate artillery. Surrender of Johnston and his army at Bennett's House April 26. Duty at Fayetteville and in Department of North Carolina until July.

== Casualties ==
The regiment lost a total of 290 men during service; 3 officers and 67 enlisted men killed or mortally wounded, 220 enlisted men died of disease.

== Commanders ==
- Colonel James A. Galligher - medical discharge in 1863
- Colonel Michael Kerwin
- Lieutenant Colonel Peter C. Shannon
- Lieutenant Colonel Garrick Mallery

== Notable members ==
- Colonel Michael Kerwin - active in Fenian affairs after the Civil War and spent time in English prison for his activities there. Was also very active in the command structure of the Fenian raids into Canada immediately after the Civil War. Spent the remainder of his life in politics in New York City.
- Lieutenant Colonel Garrick Mallery - wrote extensively on studies of "Indian Rock Writing" in the western states.
- Lieutenant Colonel Peter C. Shannon - became a territorial judge and lawyer in the western states.
- Sergeant Daniel G. Caldwell, Company H - Medal of Honor recipient for action at the Battle of Hatcher's Run
- Private Michael Dougherty, Company B - Medal of Honor recipient for action at Jefferson, Virginia

== See also ==
- List of Pennsylvania Civil War regiments
- Pennsylvania in the American Civil War
