= Falcarragh =

Town in County Donegal, Ireland

An Fál Carrach (Irish) Falcarragh
- Town
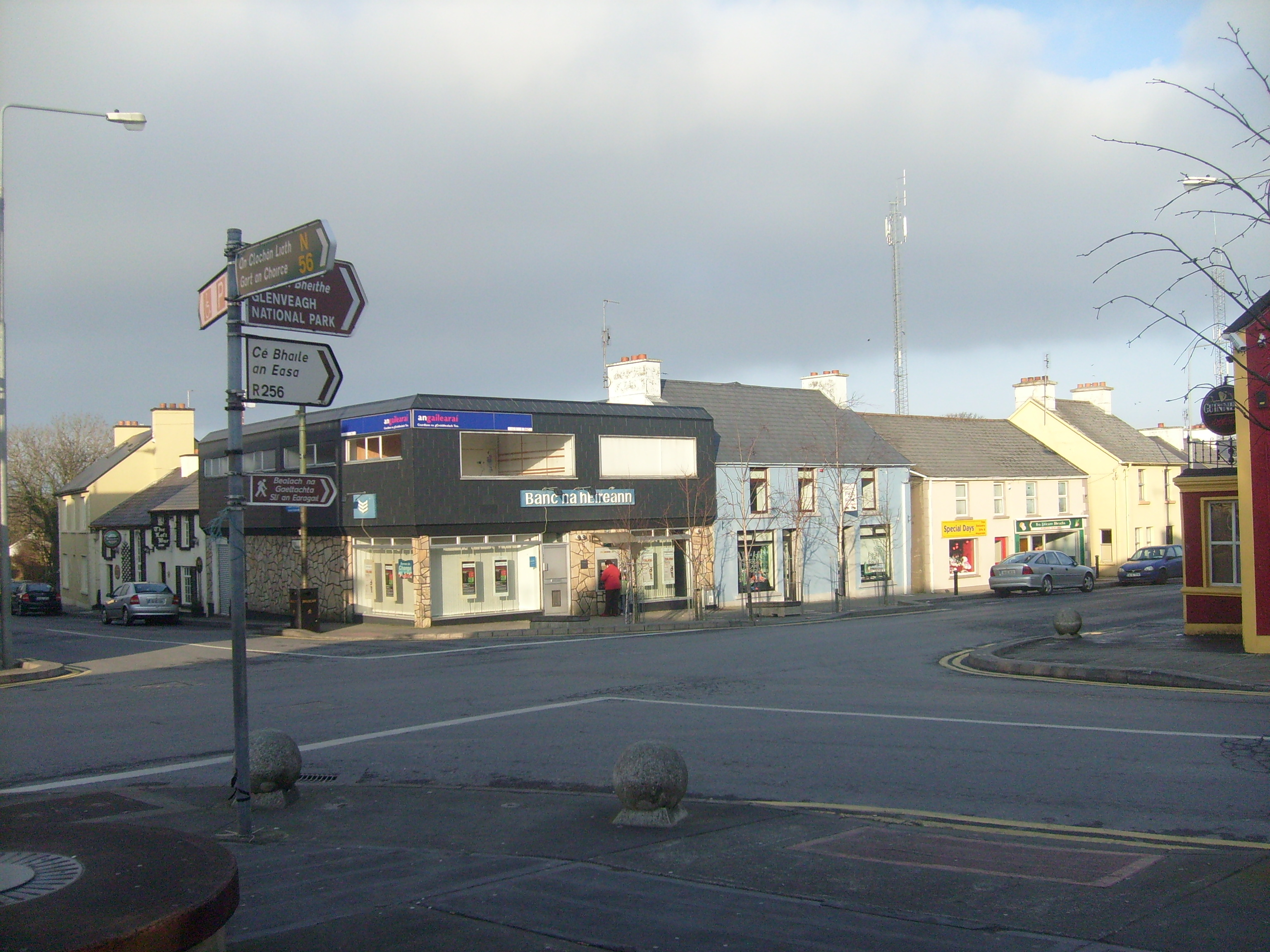
- The crossroads on Main Street

- Location in Ireland
- Coordinates: 55°08′11″N 8°06′18″W
- Country: Ireland
- Province: Ulster
- County: County Donegal
- Barony: Kilmacrenan
- District: Cloughaneely

Government
  - Dáil Éireann: Donegal
  - EU Parliament: Midlands–North-West

Population (2022)
  - Total: 829
- Area code: 074 (+353 74)
- Irish Grid Reference: B952329
- An Fál Carrach is the only official name. The anglicised spelling Falcarragh, by which the settlement is usually known, has no official status.

An Fál Carrach (anglicised as Falcarragh), sometimes called Na Crois Bhealaí ('the Crossroads'), is a small Gaeltacht town and townland in the north-west of County Donegal, Ireland. The settlement is in the district and old parish of Cloughaneely.

== Irish language ==
According to the 2016 census, of the 1,329 people over the age of 3 living in Na Crios Bhealaí electoral division, 70% of the population are able to speak Irish while 34% claim to speak the language on a daily basis outside the education system.

== Etymology ==
The name Falcarragh (lit. An (the) Fál (Wall) Carrach (Stone), Stone Wall / Boundary) has been used since 1850, ascribed so by O'Donovan as he believed Na Crois Bhealaí, meaning 'the Crossroads', was too common in Ireland to allow distinction. Na Crois Bhealaí is still used by local native Irish speakers when referring to the town. On some maps it shows up as 'Crossroads', deriving from its Irish language name Na Croisbhealaí, but older maps refer to it as Robinson's Town; however, it is now officially listed as An Fál Carrach. Falcarragh, the main commercial town between Letterkenny and Dungloe, was known in former times both as Crossroads and as Robinson's Town. An Fál Carrach, the official name, originally referred to a little hamlet south-east of the present town, at the foot of Falcarragh Hill - but gradually houses were built at the crossroads itself, mainly for the workers and tradespeople employed on the Olphert Estate, which was centred on Ballyconnell House.

== History ==
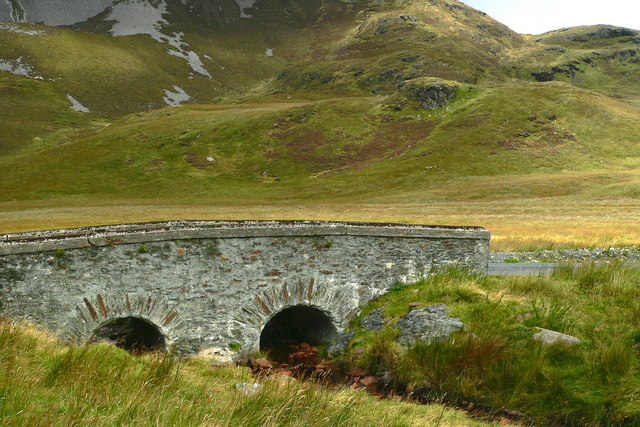
The 'Bridge of Tears' (Irish: Droichead na nDeor) near Falcarragh. Family and friends of emigrants would accompany them as far as the bridge before saying goodbye, while the emigrants would continue on to Derry Port.

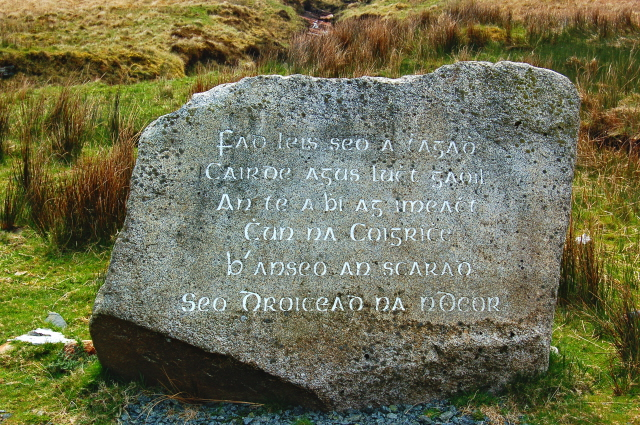
A plaque commemorating 'the Bridge of Tears', which reads: "Fad leis seo a thagadh cairde agus lucht gaoil an té a bhí ag imeacht chun na coigrithe. B'anseo an scaradh. Seo Droichead na nDeor" (Family and friends of the person leaving for foreign lands would come this far. Here was the separation. This is the Bridge of Tears).

The first recorded reference to Falcarragh appears in a report written in 1822 by William Wilson, from Raphoe in the Laggan of East Donegal. Wilson was the Church of Ireland bishop's steward responsible for the collection of tithes to support the Church of Ireland clergy. He, apparently, received a hostile reception on arrival in Cloughaneely (parish) according to his account to the bishop:

According to my intention I went to Cloughineely and on Monday about 12 o’clock arrived at a place called Falcarrow in your Lordship’s See (about five miles distant from Dunfanaghy) where I then, pursuant to advertisement, proposed holding the Court as I twice before had, but was immediately on my arrival surrounded by upwards of 150 to 300 men who had assembled merely for the purpose of preventing me from holding any Court and threatened my life if I would. Their measures I was obliged to comply with.

Slater's Directory of 1870 provides information about Falcarragh and its surrounding area:

Crossroads or Falcarragh, is a village, in the parish of Tullaghbegley, and partly of Raymunterdoney, barony of Kilmacrennan, situated on the summit of a small hill near to the coast; opposite here is the Island of Torrey, nine miles distant. The places of worship are the parish church and a Presbyterian meetinghouse. A dispensary and a school are the charitable institutions. Fairs are held on the last Thursday monthly. Population in 1861 was 231.

Slater's Directory of 1881 records that the population increased to 258 inhabitants in 1871 and also tells that there was a Protestant Episcopal church (Church of Ireland) in the town. Some information about the local post office situated at the crossroads is also given. Thomas Browne was the postmaster at the time and “letters from all parts arrive at ten minutes past eleven morning, and are dispatched at one afternoon.”

=== Landlords ===
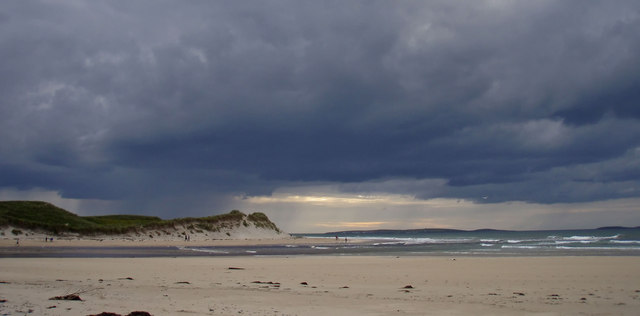
Erraroey Beach, Falcarragh

From 1622 to 1921, the Olpherts were the main landlords in the district, Sir John Olphert being the last Olphert landlord, who died in 1917. The tallest Celtic cross in Ireland is located near Falcarragh.

== Transport ==
- Falcarragh railway station opened on 9 March 1903, closed for passenger traffic on 3 June 1940 and finally closed altogether on 6 January 1947. The 1992 movie The Railway Station Man, starring Donald Sutherland and Julie Christie, was partly filmed at the Cashel Na gCorr Railway Station House which is the next Railway Station House on the line heading towards Dungloe.
- Three private bus operators stop in the area: Patrick Gallagher Coaches' services from Crolly to Derry/Belfast runs through the area; McGinley Coach Travel offers daily return coach services between north-west Donegal and Dublin, including Dublin Airport, plus regular Donegal to Glasgow routes; and Mangan Tours offers service to Letterkenny from Meenlaragh via Falcarragh.
- TFI Local Link route 966 Falcarragh/Dungloe links the area to Gortahork, Gweedore, Crolly and Dungloe.

== Notable people ==
- Eithne Coyle, a leading figure within Cumann na mBan, was born in the nearby hamlet of Killult.
- Ciaran Berry, the poet, grew up in Falcarragh.
- Hugh McFadden, the poet, literary critic and journalist, spent part of his childhood in Falcarragh and Newtown, where his father's family originated.
- Michael Dougherty, soldier

== See also ==
- List of populated places in Ireland
- Bridge of Tears
