= Bridge of Tears =

Stone bridge in County Donegal, Ireland

Coordinates: 55°05′19″N 8°00′40″W

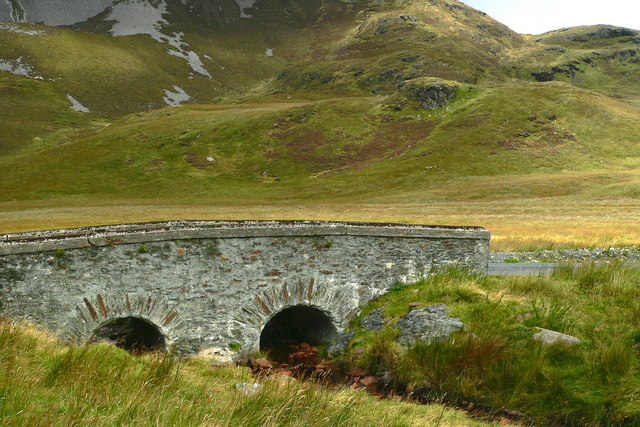
The Bridge of Tears

The Bridge of Tears, or Droichead na nDeor or Droichead na Caointe is a stone bridge located near the towns of Dunfanaghy and Falcarragh, County Donegal, Ireland.

== History ==
Prior to the introduction of railways and modern roads, the bridge was used on the main route to Derry. The port at Derry was used by emigrants leaving to start a new life in countries such as Australia, Canada, England, Brazil, Argentina, the United States, and New Zealand. The bridge was the spot that the emigrants' families would say goodbye. Due to the cost of travel, and the unlikeliness that the emigrants would return, their leaving was treated like a funeral.

A small plaque is located near the bridge, with an Irish language passage that translates to "Family and friends of the person leaving for foreign lands would come this far. Here was the separation. This is the Bridge of Tears".

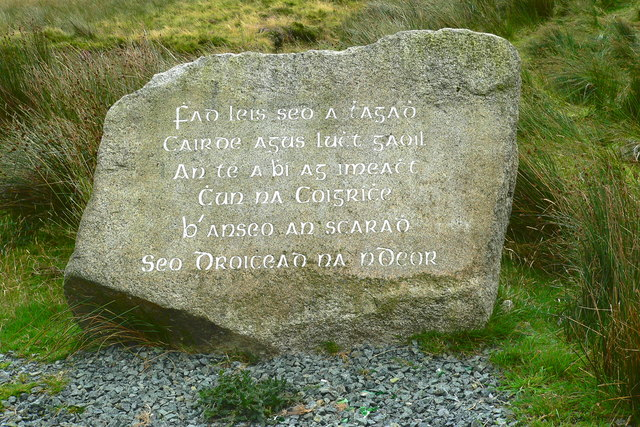
