= Breandán Mac Cnáimhsí =

Irish newsreader and translator (1921–2011)

Breandán Mac Cnáimhsí (Gort an Choirce, County Donegal, 9 May 1921 – 2 October 2011), Irish newsreader and translator.

He was educated at Coláiste Caomhín in Glasnevin, Dublin. He graduated as a schoolteacher. One of his school pupils was Dickie Rock.

In the 1950s he joined Radio Éireann as Irish-language newsreader. A decade later he joined Telefís Éireann.

He joined the Oireachtas translation staff. In 1972, he was a member of the team from the Translation Department (Rannóg an Aistriúcháin) that was sent to Brussels to translate into Irish the treaties establishing the European Communities.

He was one of the contributors to the Foclóir Gaeilge-Béarla compiled by Niall Ó Dónaill and Tomás de Bhaldraithe.
