= Spanish Island =

Island in County Cork, Ireland

Native name: Inis Píc
- Location within island of Ireland

Geography
- Location: Celtic Sea
- Coordinates: 51.50°N 9.40°W

Administration
- Ireland
- Province: Munster
- County: Cork

Spanish Island (Irish: Inis Píc) is an island of Ireland in the Roaring Water Bay, north of Baltimore, County Cork.

== See also ==
- List of islands of Ireland
