= Turbot Island =

Island in County Galway, Ireland

Turbot
Native name: Tairbeart, Inis Toirbirt
- Location within island of Ireland

Geography
- Location: Atlantic Ocean
- Coordinates: 53.50073°N 10.14984°W
- Area: 0.7389 km^{2} (0.2853 sq mi)

Administration
- Ireland
- Province: Connacht
- County: Galway

Demographics
- Population: 2 (2022)

Turbot (Inis Toirbirt or Tairbeart in Irish) is a small island and a townland of County Galway, in Ireland, also referred as Inishturbot and Talbot Island.

== Geography ==
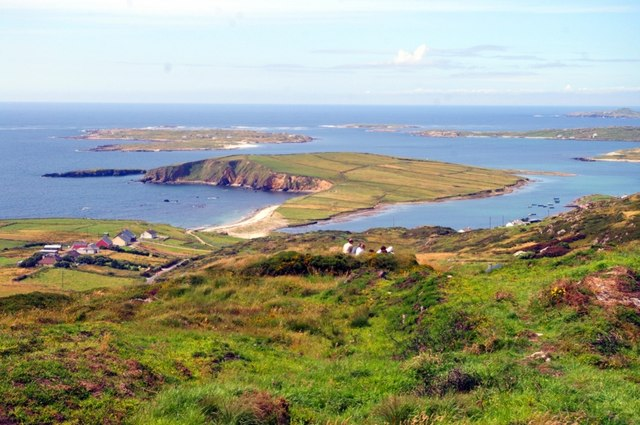
Location of the island between Aird Mhór Peninsula (fereground) and Inishturk (background)

Turbot Island lies off the Irish coast not faraway from Clifden and Cleggan. It is located South of Inishturk and West of Aird Mhór Peninsula. The easiest place to land on Turbot is the North side of the island, where most of the old houses are gathered. A road cuts Turbot from East to West.

== History ==
A small community used to live on Turbot, but the island was evacuated in 1978. Later some of the old buildings were transformed into holiday homes.

=== Demographics ===
The table below shows data on Inisturk's population taken from Discover the Islands of Ireland (Alex Ritsema, Collins Press, 1999) and the Census of Ireland.

Historical population

Year	Pop.	±%
1841	146	—
1851	169	+15.8%
1861	191	+13.0%
1871	160	−16.2%
1881	158	−1.2%
1891	115	−27.2%
1901	129	+12.2%
1911	105	−18.6%
1926	108	+2.9%

Year	Pop.	±%
1936	101	−6.5%
1946	100	−1.0%
1951	89	−11.0%
1956	97	+9.0%
1961	80	−17.5%
1966	73	−8.8%
1971	65	−11.0%
1979	7	−89.2%
1981	1	−85.7%

Year	Pop.	±%
1986	0	−100.0%
1991	0	0.00%
1996	0	0.00%
2002	0	0.00%
2006	0	0.00%
2011	0	0.00%
2016	1	—
2022	2	+100.0%

Source: Central Statistics Office. "CNA17: Population by Off Shore Island, Sex and Year". CSO.ie.

== See also ==
- List of islands of Ireland
