= Michael Dougherty (soldier) =

Irish soldier in the American Civil War (1844–1930)

- Born: 10 May 1844; Falcarragh, County Donegal, Ireland
- Died: 19 March 1930 (aged 85); Bristol, Pennsylvania, U.S.
- Burial place: Saint Mark’s Roman Catholic Churchyard, Bristol
- Military career
- Allegiance: United States (Union)
- Branch: Union Army
- Service years: 1862–1865
- Rank: Private
- Units: B Company, 13th Pennsylvania Cavalry (117th Volunteers) Regiment
- Conflicts: American Civil War; Second Battle of Winchester
- Awards: Medal of Honor

Private Michael Dougherty (10 May 1844 – 19 February 1930) was an Irish soldier who fought in the American Civil War. Dougherty received the country's highest award for bravery during combat, the Medal of Honor, for his action at Jefferson, Virginia, on 12 October 1863. He was honored with the award on 23 January 1897.

== Biography ==
Dougherty was born in Falcarragh, County Donegal, Ireland, on 10 May 1844. He emigrated to the United States in 1859. He enlisted in the 13th Pennsylvania Cavalry on 8 August 1862.

On 26 February 1863, based at Winchester, Virginia in the Shenandoah Valley, his regiment were ordered to engage what appeared to be some Confederate foragers. They captured a number of them and drove the rest into the camp of the 11th Virginia Regiment at Woodstock, some twenty miles away. While returning to base, they were engaged by rebels at Fisher’s Hill on both flanks. After fighting for half an hour, the regiment had 108 of its men wounded and captured, or killed - Dougherty was among the captured. He was taken to Libby Prison in Richmond where he remained until his release as part of a prisoner exchange on 26 May 1863.

During the Second Battle of Winchester, Dougherty was responsible for carrying dispatches, a role that earned him a gold medal for bravery from Colonel Michael Kerwin. Following the battle, the regiment became part of the Army of the Potomac.

In the early morning on 12 October 1863, the 13th Pennsylvania was on picket duty at Jefferson, on the south side of the Rappahannock opposite Sulphur Springs, when the Confederates attacked their positions, driving in the unit’s pickets. During this skirmish, Dougherty dashed across an open field at the head of his company, forcing the Confederates to abandon one of their positions in an unoccupied house. Dougherty and the company then took up position in the house, repelling waves of rebel attacks over several hours. Later in the afternoon, the rebels launched a new attack with increased strength, eventually pushing the 13th and 4th back. In the ensuing fall back many men were cut off and could not escape across the river. The 13th Pennsylvania lost 163 men, with the vast majority being forced to surrender. Dougherty had been captured again, and would remain a prisoner of war in various Confederate prisons for the remainder of the war. Dougherty would receive a Medal of Honor in January 1897 for an act of gallantry during the skirmish.

On 8 February 1864, he and 600 other prisoners boarded a train from Richmond to Andersonville prison (then known as Camp Sumter) in Georgia, arriving on 15 February. While at Andersonville, Dougherty would record the brutal conditions endured at the prison in his diary. In late 1864 Michael Dougherty’s was taken to the Andersonville hospital and almost died. He was released on 12 April 1865.

After his release from prison, he was sent to Camp Fisk, the parole camp set up four-miles outside of Vicksburg, Mississippi. On 24 April 1865, he was placed aboard the Mississippi steamboat Sultana along with almost 2,000 other recently paroled Union prisoners of war. On 27 April 1865, the Sultana exploded her boilers near Memphis, Tennessee, killing almost 1,200 people. Private Dougherty survived the explosion and was eventually sent to Spring Mills, Pennsylvania, where he was discharged from the army on 27 June 1865.

Following the war he married Rose Magee, a union which produced 12 children. He lived with his family in Philadelphia, working at the U.S. Mint. In 1908 he published his diary, which chronicled his experiences in Confederate prisons. Dougherty was a member of Bristol Council between 1880 and 1882, as well as being an active member of the Ancient Order of Hibernians.

He died on 19 February 1930 at his home in Bristol, and he is buried at Saint Mark’s Roman Catholic Churchyard in Bristol.

== Medal of Honor citation ==

Medal of Honor citation reads:

At the head of a detachment of his company dashed across an open field, exposed to a deadly fire from the enemy, and succeeded in dislodging them from an unoccupied house, which he and his comrades defended for several hours against repeated attacks, thus preventing the enemy from flanking the position of the Union forces.

== See also ==
- List of American Civil War Medal of Honor recipients: A–F
