= Inishbofin, County Donegal =

Island in County Donegal, Ireland

Inishbofin
Native name: Inis Bó Finne
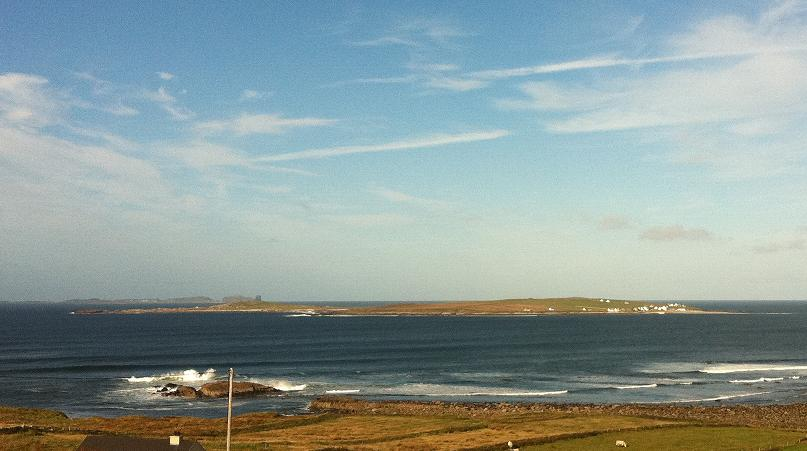
- Inishbofin as seen from Machaire Rabhartaigh, with Tory Island visible in the distance

- Location within island of Ireland

Geography
- Location: Atlantic Ocean
- Coordinates: 55°10′23″N 8°10′08″W
- Area: 1.2 km^{2} (0.46 sq mi)

Administration
- Ireland
- Province: Ulster
- County: Donegal

Demographics
- Population: 16 (2022)

Inishbofin (Irish: Inis Bó Finne, meaning 'island of the white cow'), also Inishbofinne, is an island and townland off the coast of Machaire Uí Rabhartaigh (Magheraroarty), County Donegal, Ireland.

== Geography ==
The island is a 120-hectare (300 acre) land mass, with an economy traditionally based on fishing and farming. Irish is spoken routinely. There are no pubs or shops on the island. There is a boat service to and from it but no regular ferry.

It is the largest of a small group of islands; the others, Inis Dúiche and Inis Beag, lie to the north and are uninhabited.

== Demographics ==
In 100 years Inishbofin's population dropped from 166 (1911) to 16 (2022).

Historical population

Year	Pop.	±%
1841	121	—
1851	122	+0.8%
1861	150	+23.0%
1871	125	−16.7%
1881	139	+11.2%
1891	146	+5.0%
1901	150	+2.7%
1911	166	+10.7%
1926	136	−18.1%

Year	Pop.	±%
1936	138	+1.5%
1946	139	+0.7%
1951	120	−13.7%
1956	102	−15.0%
1961	117	+14.7%
1966	98	−16.2%
1971	103	+5.1%
1979	69	−33.0%
1981	46	−33.3%

Year	Pop.	±%
1986	6	−87.0%
1991	3	−50.0%
1996	24	+700.0%
2002	16	−33.3%
2006	36	+125.0%
2011	11	−69.4%
2016	2	−81.8%
2022	16	+700.0%

The table reports data taken from Discover the Islands of Ireland (Alex Ritsema, Collins Press, 1999) and the Census of Ireland. Census data in Ireland before 1841 were not complete and/or reliable.

== Gallery ==
Images of Inishbofin

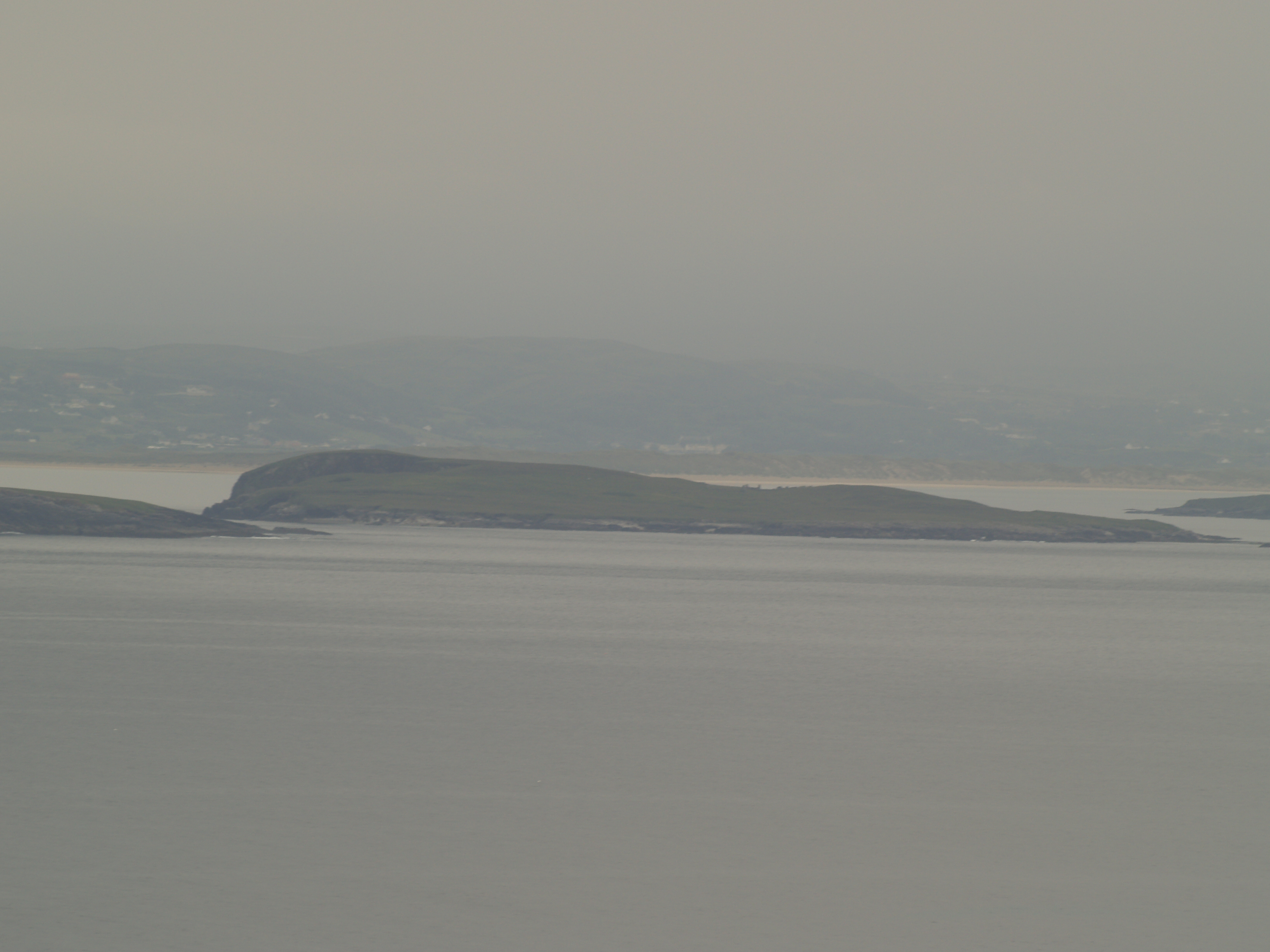
Inishbofin as seen from Tory Island

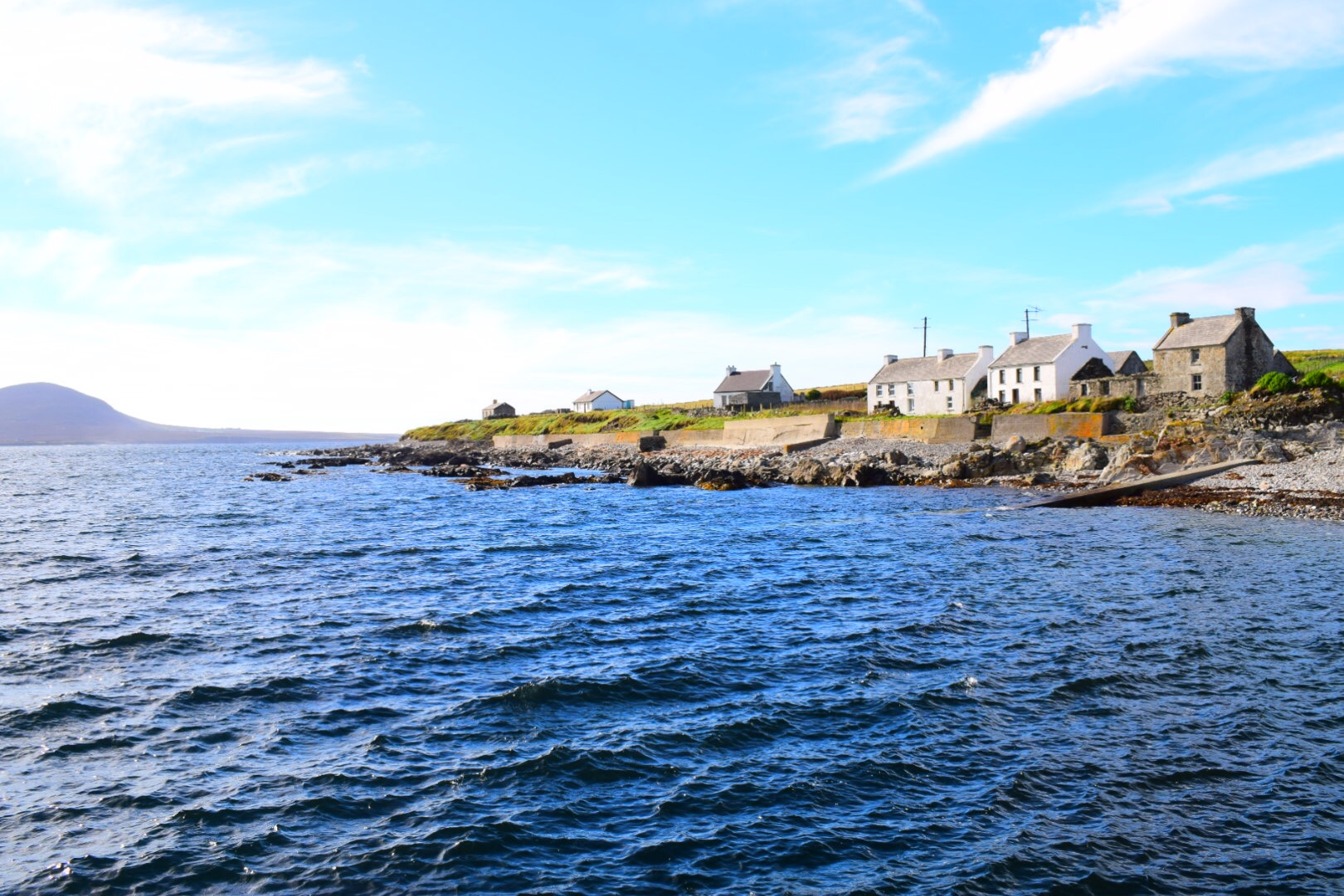
The harbour

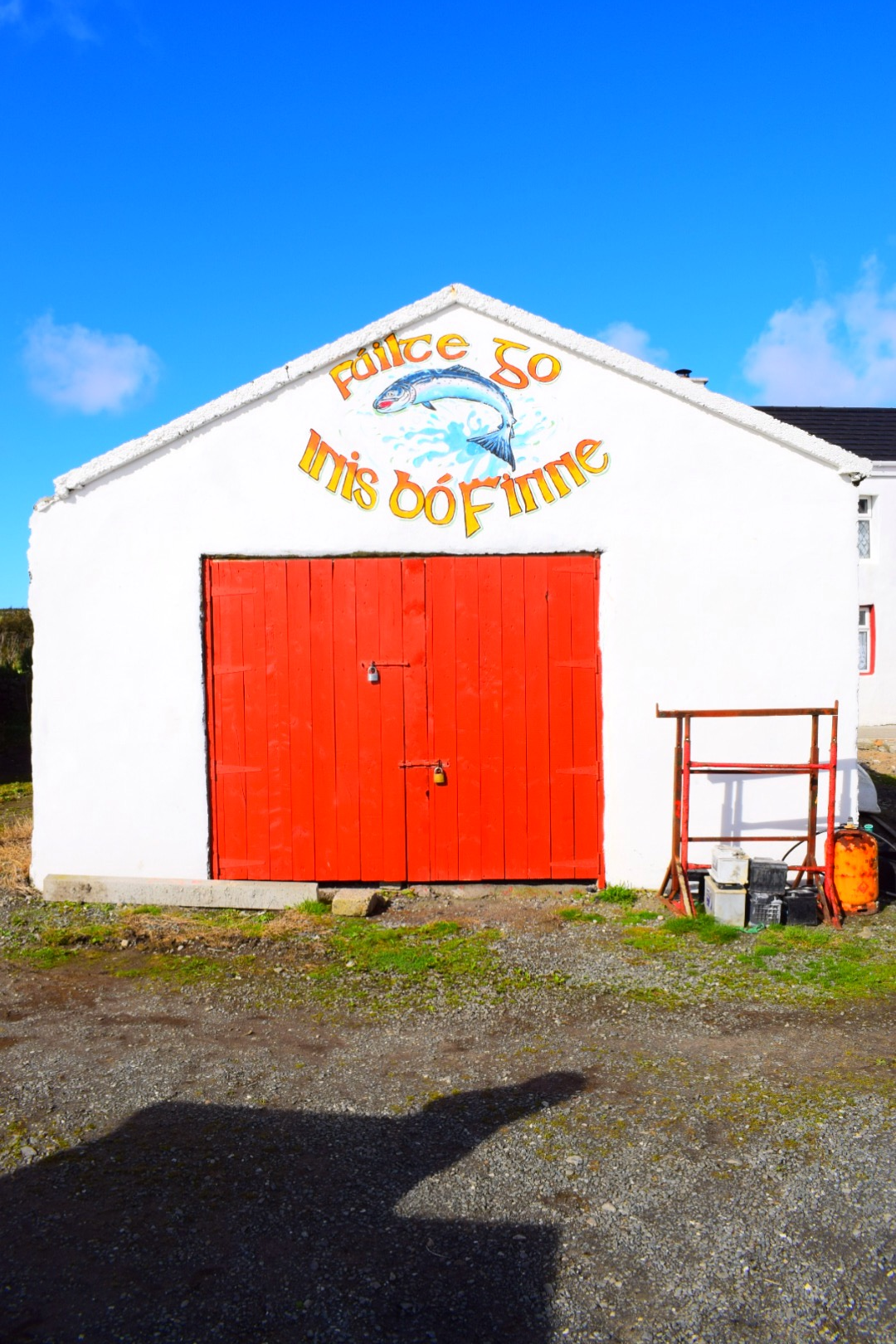
Inishbofin

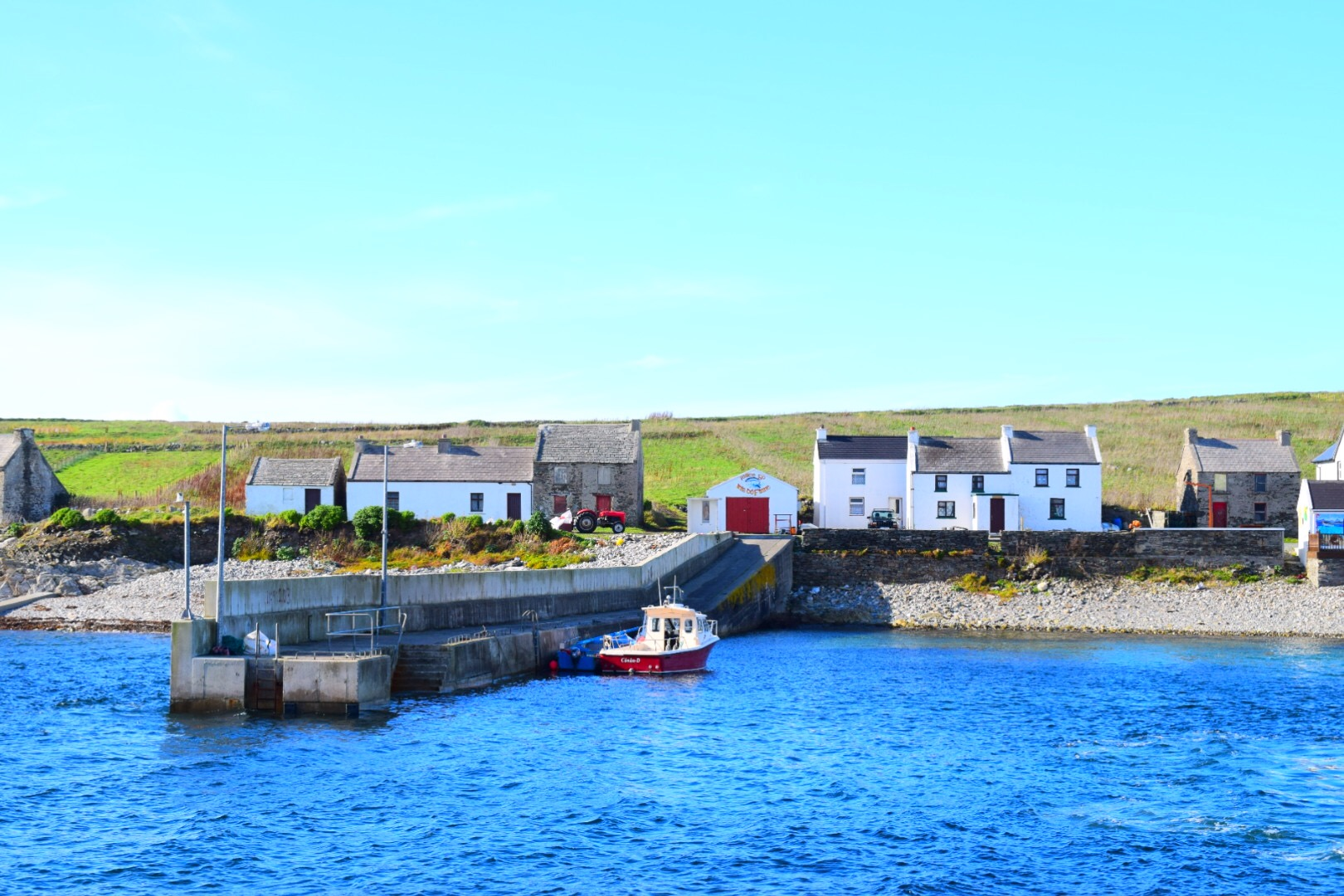
Landing at Inishbofin

== See also ==
- List of islands of Ireland
