= Inisheltia =

Island in County Galway, Ireland

Coordinates: 53°21′09″N 9°35′42″W

Native name: Inis Aillte

Geography
- Location: Atlantic Ocean

Administration
- Ireland
- Province: Connacht
- County: Galway

Demographics
- Population: 0 (2006)

Inisheltia (Gaeilge: Inis Aillte) is an uninhabited island in County Galway. There are few buildings on the island, but the ruins of an abandoned farmhouse and cottage remain.

== Demographics ==
Historical population

Year	Pop.	±%
1841	0	—
1851	3	—
1861	0	−100.0%
1871	3	—
1881	3	+0.0%
1891	6	+100.0%
1901	8	+33.3%
1911	4	−50.0%

Year	Pop.	±%
1926	3	−25.0%
1936	9	+200.0%
1946	13	+44.4%
1951	12	−7.7%
1956	8	−33.3%
1961	5	−37.5%
1966	5	+0.0%
1971	4	−20.0%

Year	Pop.	±%
1979	2	−50.0%
1981	3	+50.0%
1986	3	+0.0%
1991	3	+0.0%
1996	0	−100.0%
2002	0	0.00%
2006	0	0.00%

Source: Central Statistics Office. "CNA17: Population by Off Shore Island, Sex and Year". CSO.ie.
