= Illauneeragh =

Island in County Galway, Ireland

Native name: An tOileán Iarthach
- Location within island of Ireland

Geography
- Location: Atlantic Ocean
- Coordinates: 53°16′48″N 9°44′15″W

Administration
- Ireland
- Province: Connacht
- County: Galway

Demographics
- Population: 0 (2006)

Illauneeragh (Gaeilge:An tOileán Iarthach) is an island in County Galway, Ireland.

Historical population

Year	Pop.	±%
1841	15	—
1851	30	+100.0%
1861	13	−56.7%
1871	14	+7.7%
1881	19	+35.7%
1891	23	+21.1%
1901	18	−21.7%
1911	18	+0.0%

Year	Pop.	±%
1926	26	+44.4%
1936	23	−11.5%
1946	20	−13.0%
1951	8	−60.0%
1956	0	−100.0%
1961	0	0.00%
1966	0	0.00%
1971	0	0.00%

Year	Pop.	±%
1979	0	0.00%
1981	0	0.00%
1986	0	0.00%
1991	0	0.00%
1996	0	0.00%
2002	0	0.00%
2006	0	0.00%

Source: Central Statistics Office. "CNA17: Population by Off Shore Island, Sex and Year". CSO.ie.

== See also ==
- Illauneeragh West
