= Rossmore Island =

Island in County Kerry, Ireland

- Location within island of Ireland

Geography
- Location: Kenmare River
- Coordinates: 51°49′30″N 9°48′00″W

Administration
- Ireland
- Province: Munster
- County: Kerry

Demographics
- Population: 15 (2022)

Rossmore Island is a former island in County Kerry, now joined to the mainland via a bridge.

== Demographics ==
Historical population

Year	Pop.	±%
1841	0	—
1851	170	—
1861	130	−23.5%
1871	101	−22.3%
1881	120	+18.8%
1891	107	−10.8%
1901	79	−26.2%
1911	56	−29.1%
1926	42	−25.0%

Year	Pop.	±%
1936	37	−11.9%
1946	34	−8.1%
1951	32	−5.9%
1956	26	−18.8%
1961	19	−26.9%
1966	13	−31.6%
1971	11	−15.4%
1979	9	−18.2%
1981	9	+0.0%

Year	Pop.	±%
1986	7	−22.2%
1991	7	+0.0%
1996	8	+14.3%
2002	7	−12.5%
2006	6	−14.3%
2011	10	+66.7%
2016	8	−20.0%
2022	15	+87.5%

Source: Central Statistics Office. "CNA17: Population by Off Shore Island, Sex and Year". CSO.ie.
