= Roancarrigmore =

Island in Bantry Bay. County Cork, Ireland

Native name: Róncharraig Mhór
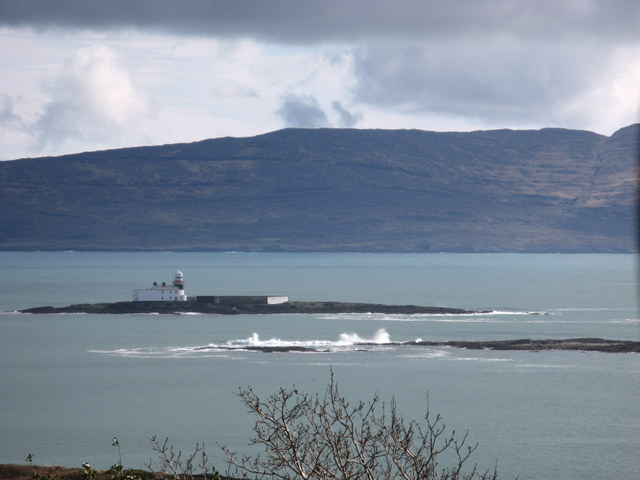
- Lighthouse on Roancarrigmore in the Bantry Bay - geograph.org.uk - 1121216

- Location within island of Ireland

Geography
- Location: Bantry Bay
- Coordinates: 51°39′11″N 9°44′51″W

Administration
- Ireland
- Province: Munster
- County: Cork

Demographics
- Population: 0

Roancarrigmore (Gaeilge: Róncharraig Mhór) is an uninhabited island in Bantry Bay, County Cork, Ireland and is home to Roancarrigmore Lighthouse, which was replaced in 2012 by a solar powered lighthouse after 165 years of operation.

In September 2016 the lighthouse was put up for sale.

Historical population

Year	Pop.	±%
1841	0	—
1851	10	—
1861	7	−30.0%
1871	4	−42.9%
1881	9	+125.0%
1891	11	+22.2%
1901	2	−81.8%
1911	2	+0.0%

Year	Pop.	±%
1926	2	+0.0%
1936	2	+0.0%
1946	2	+0.0%
1951	4	+100.0%
1956	2	−50.0%
1961	2	+0.0%
1966	2	+0.0%
1971	3	+50.0%

Year	Pop.	±%
1979	0	−100.0%
1981	0	0.00%
1986	0	0.00%
1991	0	0.00%
1996	0	0.00%
2002	0	0.00%
2006	0	0.00%

Source: Central Statistics Office. "CNA17: Population by Off Shore Island, Sex and Year". CSO.ie.
