= Maínis =

- Location within island of Ireland

Geography
- Location: Atlantic Ocean
- Coordinates: 53.3002°N 9.8763°W

Administration
- Ireland
- Province: Connacht
- County: Galway

Demographics
- Population: 127 (2022)

Maínis or Mweenish is an island off the Connemara coast in the heart of the Conamara Gaeltacht. The island is close to Carna and linked to the mainland by a bridge. It is noted for its isolation and rugged beauty.

== Notable people ==
- Colman Ó Cathasaigh

- traditional boat builder

Historical population

Year	Pop.	±%
1841	649	—
1851	471	−27.4%
1861	523	+11.0%
1871	418	−20.1%
1881	510	+22.0%
1891	514	+0.8%
1901	425	−17.3%
1911	376	−11.5%
1926	313	−16.8%

Year	Pop.	±%
1936	250	−20.1%
1946	215	−14.0%
1951	206	−4.2%
1956	201	−2.4%
1961	215	+7.0%
1966	196	−8.8%
1971	198	+1.0%
1979	182	−8.1%
1981	188	+3.3%

Year	Pop.	±%
1986	170	−9.6%
1991	149	−12.4%
1996	150	+0.7%
2002	146	−2.7%
2006	140	−4.1%
2011	145	+3.6%
2016	137	−5.5%
2022	127	−7.3%

Source: Central Statistics Office. "CNA17: Population by Off Shore Island, Sex and Year". CSO.ie.
