= Furnace Island =

Fornais Furnace Island
- Island
- Location in Ireland
- Coordinates: 53°15′18″N 9°44′32″W
- Country: Ireland
- Province: Connacht
- County: County Galway

Government
  - Dáil Éireann: Galway West

Population (2022)
  - Total: 66
- Time zone: UTC+0 (WET)
  - Summer (DST): UTC-1 (IST (WEST))
- As this is a Gaeltacht, Fornais is the only official name.

Furnace Island, or simply Furnace (officially known by its Irish name Fornais), is one of the inhabited South Connemara Islands of County Galway, in Ireland. It is connected to the mainland by a bridge to the island Lettermullan.

== See also ==
- Ceantar na nOileán
