= Meenlaragh =

Gaeltacht village in County Donegal, Ireland

Meenlaragh Mín Lárach
- Village
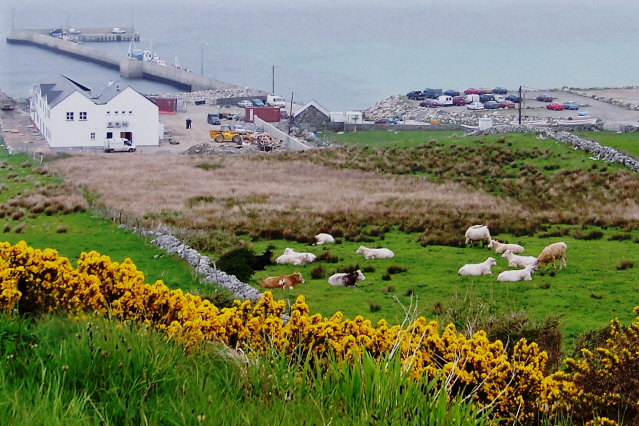
- Pier at Meenlaragh

- Location in Ireland
- Coordinates: 55°8′41″N 8°11′12″W
- Country: Ireland
- Province: Ulster
- County: County Donegal

Population (2022)
  - Total: 453
- Time zone: UTC+0 (WET)
  - Summer (DST): UTC-1 (IST (WEST))

Meenlaragh (Irish: Mín Lárach) is a village and townland located in County Donegal, Ireland.

According to the 2016 census of Ireland, it has the highest proportion of Irish language speakers of any town in Ireland. Over 70% of the residents speak Irish on a daily basis.
