= Machaire Rabhartaigh =

Machaire Rabhartaigh Magheroarty
- Village
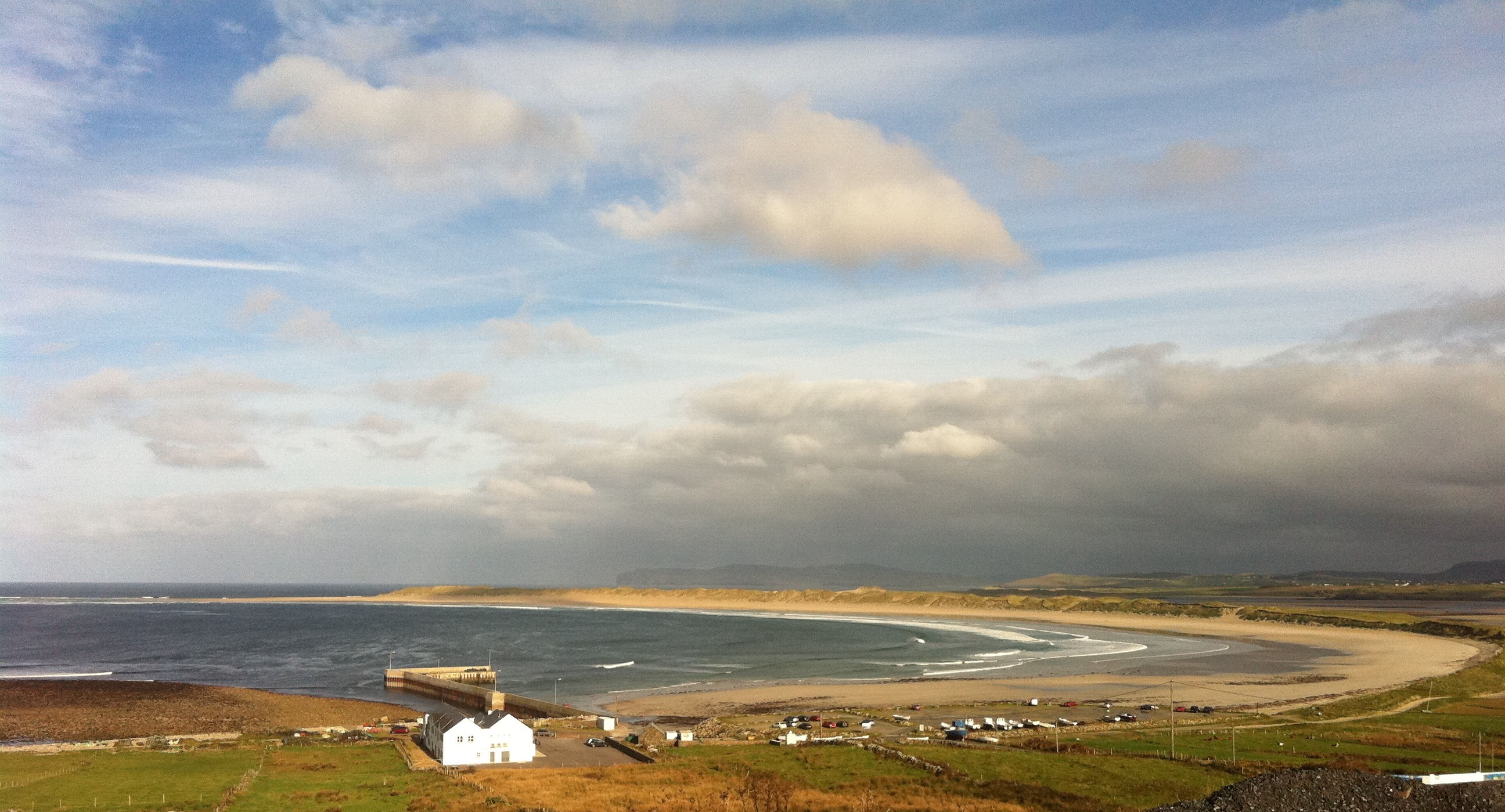
- Machaire Rabhartaigh strand, October 2011

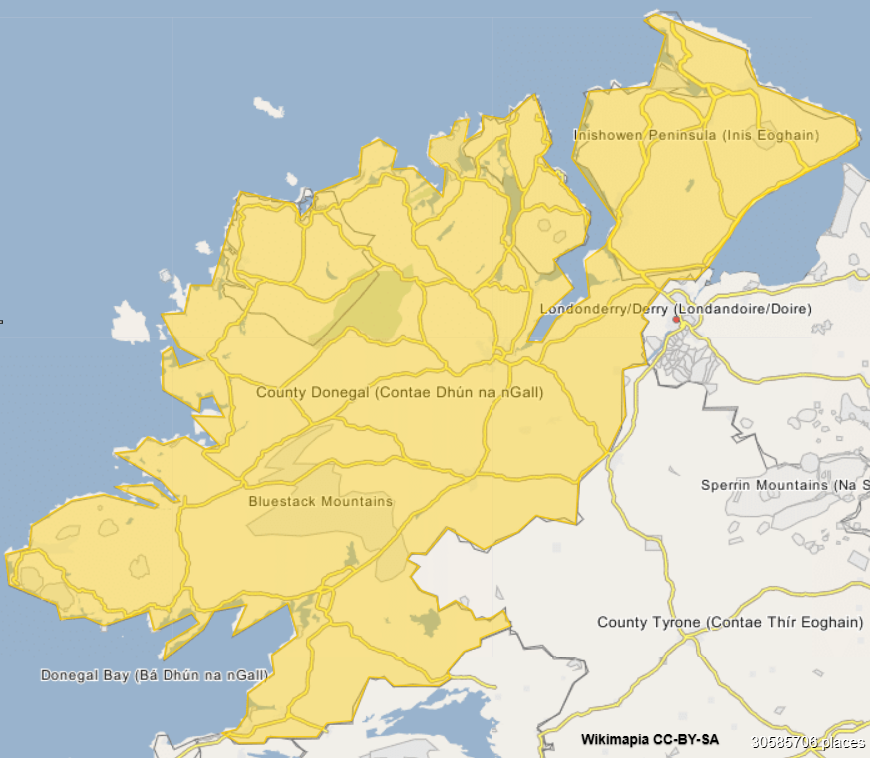
- Location within County Donegal Location within Ireland
- Coordinates: 55°08′28″N 8°10′18″W
- Country: Ireland
- Province: Ulster
- County: County Donegal

Government
  - Dáil Éireann: Donegal
- Area code: 074, +000 353 74
- Irish Grid Reference: B847228

Machaire Rabhartaigh (known in English as Magheroarty), meaning "plain of the spring tide/plain of Roarty", is a Gaeltacht village and townland on the north-west coast of County Donegal in Ulster, the northern province in Ireland. It is in the parish of Cloughaneely and its main access road is the R257.

It has been home to a Gael Linn Irish language Summer school, Coláiste Mhachaire Rabhartaigh, since 1981 which runs courses for teenagers from Northern Ireland every summer.

The village has a port used by fishing vessels. It also the main ferry port for Tory Island.

It attracts tourists during the summer and watersports enthusiasts visit the area to windsurf/surf/kitesurf and to go kayaking in the bay. A natural reef exists to the left of the pier which provides conditions suitable for surfing throughout the year. Amenities include a pub, café and Scoil Naomh Dubhthach Machaire Rabhartaigh, an Irish-medium primary school.
