= Connemara =

Region in County Galway, Ireland

Coordinates: 53°30′N 9°45′W

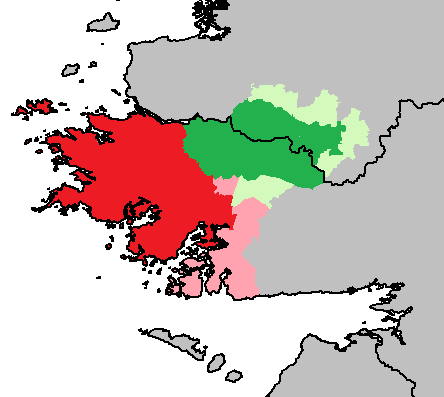
Connemara highlighted in red, and Joyce Country or Partry highlighted in green

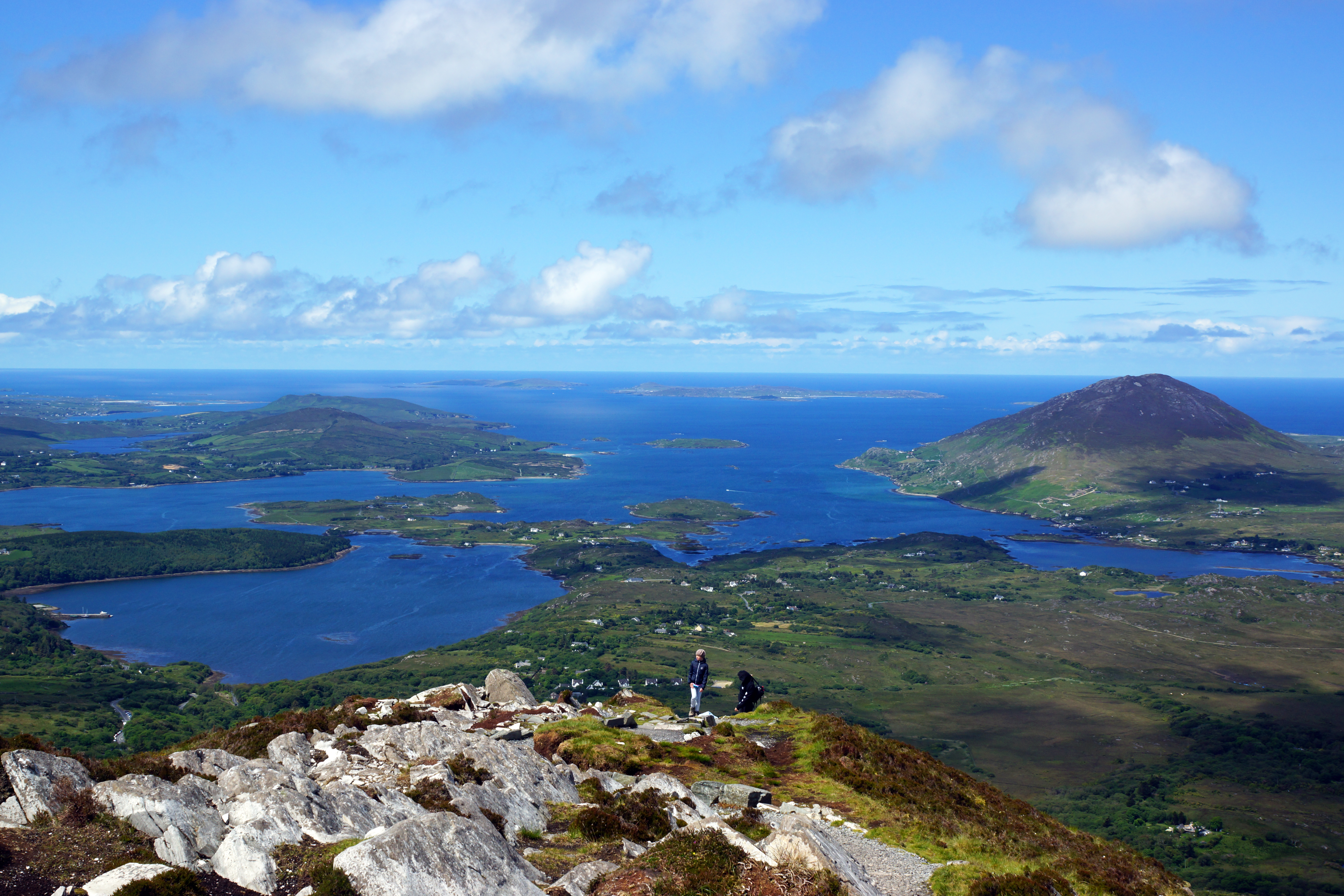
A view of the Connemara coast from Diamond Hill

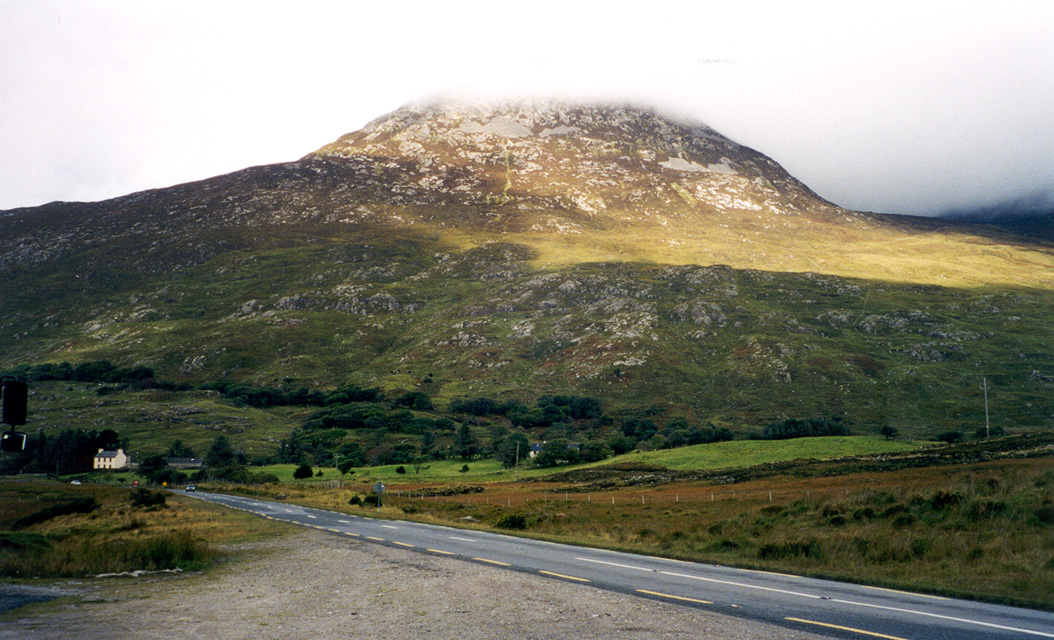
A view of Derryclare from the N59 road

Connemara (/ˌkɒnɪˈmɑːrə/, KON-ih-MAR-ə; Irish: Conamara [ˌkʊnˠəˈmˠaɾˠə]) is a region on the Atlantic coast of western County Galway, in the west of Ireland. The region has a strong association with traditional Irish culture and containing most of the Connacht Irish-speaking Gaeltacht, a key part of its identity and the largest Gaeltacht in Ireland. Historically, Connemara was part of the territory of Iar Connacht (West Connacht). Geographically, it has many mountains (notably the Twelve Pins), peninsulas, coves, islands and small lakes. Connemara National Park is in the northwest. It is mostly rural and its largest settlement is Clifden.

== Etymology ==
"Connemara" derives from the tribal name Conmhaicne Mara, which designated a branch of the Conmacne, an early tribal grouping that had a number of branches located in different parts of Connacht. Since this particular branch of the Conmacne lived by the sea, they became known as the Conmacne Mara (sea in Irish is muir, genitive mara, hence "of the sea").

== Definition ==
One common definition of the area is that it consists of most of west Galway, that is to say the part of the county west of Lough Corrib and Galway city, contained by Killary Harbour, Galway Bay and the Atlantic Ocean. Some more restrictive definitions of Connemara define it as the historical territory of Conmhaicne Mara, i.e. just the far northwest of County Galway, bordering County Mayo. The name is also used to describe the Gaeltacht (Irish-speaking areas) of western County Galway, though it is argued that this too is inaccurate as some of these areas lie outside of the traditional boundary of Connemara. There are arguments about where Connemara ends as it approaches Galway city, which is definitely not in Connemara – some argue for Barna, on the outskirts of Galway City, some for a line from Oughterard to Maam Cross, and then diagonally down to the coast, all within rural lands.

The wider area of what is today known as Connemara was previously a sovereign kingdom known as Iar Connacht, under the kingship of the Ó Flaithbertaigh, until it became part of the English-administered Kingdom of Ireland in the 16th century.

== History ==
The main town of Connemara is Clifden, which is surrounded by an area rich with megalithic tombs.

The famous "Connemara Green marble" is found outcropping along a line between Streamstown and Lissoughter. It was a trade treasure used by the inhabitants in prehistoric times. It continues to be of great value today. It is available in large dimensional slabs suitable for buildings as well as for smaller pieces of jewellery.

=== Clan system ===
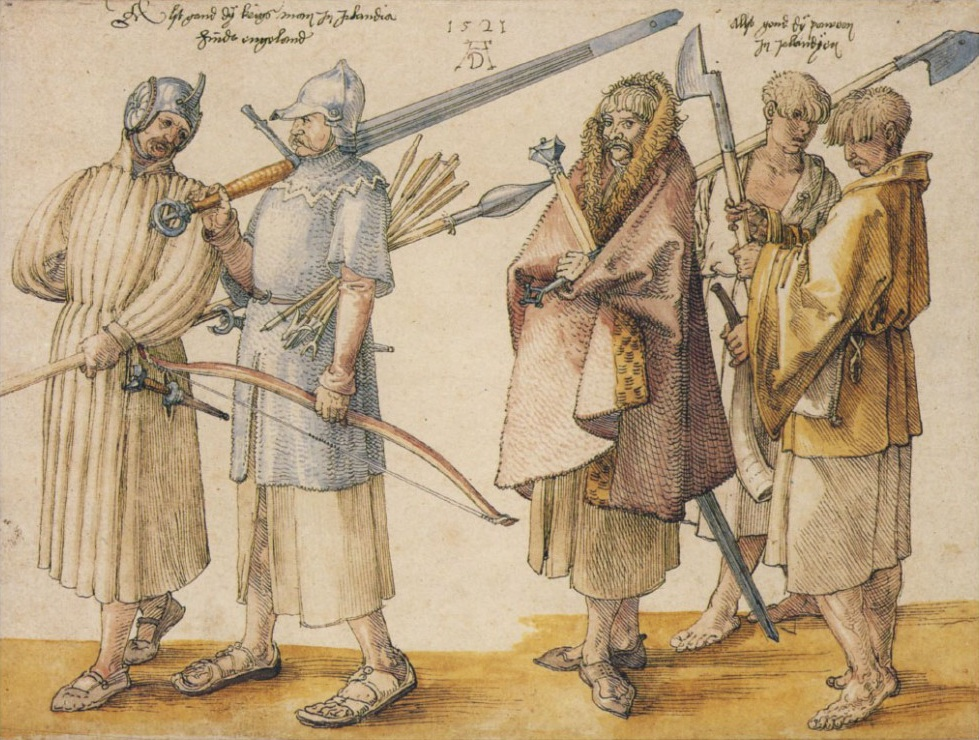
Irish kern and gallowglass armed with pikes, longswords, and the Lochaber axe. Drawing by Albrecht Dürer, 1521.

Before the Tudor and Cromwellian conquests, Connemara, like the rest of Gaelic Ireland, was ruled by Irish clans whose Chiefs and their derbhfine were expected to follow the same code of honour also expected of Scottish clan chiefs.

In his biography of Rob Roy MacGregor, W.H. Murray described the code of honour as follows, "The abiding principle is cast up from the records of detail: that right must be seen to be done, no man left destitute, the given word honoured, the strictest honour observed to all who have given implicit trust, and that a guest's confidence in his safety must never be betrayed by his host, or vice versa. There was more of like kind, and each held as its kernel the simple ideal of trust honoured... Breaches of it were abhorred and damned... The ideal was applied 'with discretion'. Its interpretation went deeply into domestic life, but stayed shallow for war and politics."

The east of what is now Connemara was once called Delbhna Tír Dhá Locha, and was ruled by Kings who claimed descent from the Delbhna and Dál gCais of Thomond and kinship with King Brian Boru. The Kings of Delbhna Tír Dhá Locha eventually took the title and surname Mac Con Raoi (since anglicised as Conroy or King).

The Chief of the Name of Clan Mac Con Raoi directly ruled as Lord of Gnó Mhór, which was later divided into the civil parishes of Kilcummin and Killannin. As was common practice at the time, due to the power they wielded through their war galleys, the Chiefs of Clan Mac Conraoi also fulfilled their duty to be providers for their clan members by demanding and receiving black rent on pain of piracy against ships who fished or traded within the Clan's territory. The Chiefs of Clan Mac Conraoi were accordingly numbered, along with the Chiefs of Clans O'Malley, O'Dowd, and O'Flaherty, among "the Sea Kings of Connacht". The nearby kingdom of Gnó Beag was ruled by the Chief of the Name of Clan Ó hÉanaí (usually anglicised as Heaney or Heeney).

The Ó Cadhla (Kealy) clan were the rulers of West Connemara. Like the Chiefs of Clan Ó Cadhla clan, the Chiefs of Clan Mac Conghaile (Conneely) also claimed descent from the Conmhaicne Mara.

During the early 13th century, but all four clans were displaced and subjugated by the Chiefs of Clan Ó Flaithbertaigh, who had been driven west from Maigh Seola into Iar Connacht by the Mac William Uachtar branch of the House of Burgh, during the Hiberno-Norman invasion of Connacht.

According to Irish–American historian Bridget Connelly, "By the thirteenth century, the original inhabitants, the clans Conneely, Ó Cadhain, Ó Folan, and MacConroy, had been steadily driven westward from the Moycullen area to the seacoast between Moyrus and the Killaries. And by 1586, with the signing of the Articles of the Composition of Connacht that made Morrough O'Flaherty landlord over all in the name of Queen Elizabeth I, the MacConneelys and Ó Folans had sunk beneath the list of chieftains whose names appeared on the document. The Articles deprived all the original Irish clan chieftains not only of their title but also all of the rents, dues, and tribal rights they had possessed under Irish law."

During the 16th century, but legendary local pirate queen Grace O'Malley is on record as having said, with regard to her followers, (Irish: "Go mb'fhearr léi lán loinge de chlann Chonraoi agus de chlann Mhic an Fhailí ná lán loinge d'ór") ("Better a ship filled with MacConroy and MacAnally clansmen, than a ship filled with gold").

Even though she has traditionally been viewed as an icon of Irish nationalism, Grace O'Malley, in reality, sided with Queen Elizabeth I against Red Hugh O'Donnell and Aodh Mór Ó Néill during the Nine Years War, after which her known descendants became completely assimilated into the British upper class. Even though O'Donnell and O'Neill were seeking primarily to end the religious persecution of the Catholic Church in Ireland by the English Queen her officials, O'Malley almost certainly considered herself completely justified under the code of conduct in siding with the Crown of England against them.

The feud began in 1595, when O'Donnell re-instated the Chiefdom of Clan MacWilliam Íochdar of the completely Gaelicised House of Burgh in County Mayo, which had been abolished under the policy of surrender and regrant. Instead, however, of allowing Clan a Burc to summon a gathering at which the nobles and commons would debate and then choose one of the derbhfine of the last chief to lead them, O'Donnell instead chose to appoint his ally Tiobóid mac Walter Ciotach Búrca as Chief of the Name. By passing over the claim of her son Tiobóid na Long Búrca to the Chiefdom, O'Donnell made himself a permanent and very dangerous enemy out of his mother's former ally; Grace O'Malley. The latter was swift to retaliate by launching an English-backed regime change war, in which she fought against Hugh Roe in order to wrest the White Wand of the Chiefdom away from Tiobóid Mac Walter Ciotach and give it to her son. She was joined in this by the Clan O'Flaherty and the Irish clans of Connemara who followed their mantle.

Irish clan chief, historian, and refugee in Habsburg Spain Philip O'Sullivan Beare later went on the record as a very harsh critic of Niall Garbh O'Donnell, Tiobóid na Long Búrca, Grace O'Malley, and other members of the Gaelic nobility of Ireland who similarly launched regime change wars within their clans with English backing. Having the benefit of hindsight regarding the long-term fallout from Tiobóid na Long Búrca's uprising against his Chief and many others like it nationwide, O'Sullivan Beare wrote, "The Catholics might have been able to find a remedy for all these evils, had it not been that they were destroyed from within by another and greater internal disease. For most of the families, clans, and towns of the Catholic chiefs, who took up arms in defense of the Catholic Faith, were divided into different factions, each having different leaders and following lords who were fighting for their estates and chieftaincies. The less powerful of them joined the English party in the hope of gaining the chieftainship of their clans, if the existing chieftains were removed from their position and property, and the English craftily held out that hope to them. Thus, short-sighted men, putting their private affairs before the public defence of their Holy Faith, turned their allies, followers, and towns from the Catholic chiefs and transferred to the English great resources, but in the end did not obtain what they wished for, but accomplished what they did not desire. For it was not they, but the English who got the properties of and rich patrimonies of the Catholic nobles and their kinsmen; and the Holy Faith of Christ Jesus, bereft of its defenders, lay open to the barbarous violence and lust of the heretics. There was one device by which the English were able to crush the forces of the Irish Chiefs, by promising their honours and revenues to such of their own kinsmen as would seduce their followers and allies from them, but when the war was over the English did not keep their promises."

=== Religious persecution ===
Before the Suppression of the Monasteries was spread to Connemara, the Dominican Order had a monastery about 2 miles (3.2 km) to the north of what is now Roundstone (Irish: Cloch na Rón).

During the centuries of religious persecution of the Catholic Church in Ireland that began under Henry VIII and ended only with Catholic emancipation in 1829, the Irish people, according to Marcus Tanner, clung to the Tridentine Mass, "crossed themselves when they passed Protestant ministers on the road, had to be dragged into Protestant churches and put cotton wool in their ears rather than listen to Protestant sermons."

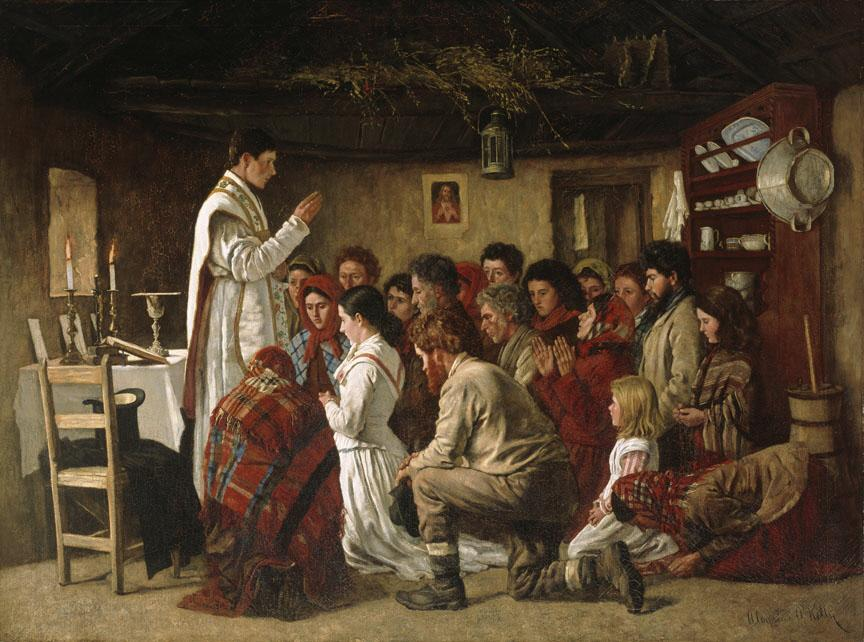
Mass in a Connemara Cabin by Aloysius O'Kelly, 1883. The custom of priests saying Mass secretly in people's homes dates to the penal laws-era. It was especially common in rural areas.

According to historian and folklorist Seumas MacManus, "Throughout these dreadful centuries, too, the hunted priest -- who in his youth had been smuggled to the Continent of Europe to receive his training -- tended the flame of faith. He lurked like a thief among the hills. On Sundays and Feast Days he celebrated Mass at a rock, on a remote mountainside, while the congregation knelt on the heather of the hillside, under the open heavens. While he said Mass, faithful sentries watched from all the nearby hilltops, to give timely warning of the approaching priest-hunter and his guard of British soldiers. But sometimes the troops came on them unawares, and the Mass Rock was bespattered with his blood, -- and men, women, and children caught in the crime of worshipping God among the rocks, were frequently slaughtered on the mountainside."

According to historian and folklorist Tony Nugent, several Mass rocks survive in Connemara from this era. There is one located along the boreen named Baile Eamoinn near Spiddal. Two others are located at Barr na Daoire and at Caorán Beag in Carraroe. A fourth, Cluain Duibh, is located near Moycullen at Clooniff. The cartographer Tim Robinson has written of a fifth Mass rock, located in the Townland of "An Tulaigh", which also includes two holy wells and, formerly, a Christian pilgrimage chapel dedicated to St. Columkille, who is said in the oral tradition to have visited the region. The Mass rock was built from several of the many boulders scattered by glaciers around Lough Clurra and is named in Irish "Cloch an tSagairt" ("Stone of the Priest"), but which was formerly marked as "Druid's altar" and dolmen on the old Ordnance Survey maps.

After taking the island in 1653, the New Model Army of Oliver Cromwell turned the nearby island of Inishbofin, County Galway, into a prison camp for Roman Catholic priests arrested while exercising their religious ministry covertly in other parts of Ireland. Inishmore, in the nearby Aran Islands, was used for exactly the same purpose. The last priests held on both islands were finally released following the Stuart Restoration in 1662.

One of the last Chiefs of Clan O'Flaherty and Lord of Iar Connacht was the 17th-century historian Ruaidhrí Ó Flaithbheartaigh, who lost the greater part of his ancestral lands during the Cromwellian confiscations of the 1650s.

After being dispossessed, Ó Flaithbheartaigh settled near Spiddal wrote a book of Irish history in Neo-Latin titled Ogygia, which was published in 1685 as Ogygia: seu Rerum Hibernicarum Chronologia & etc., in 1793 it was translated into English by Rev. James Hely, as Ogygia, or a Chronological account of Irish Events (collected from Very Ancient Documents faithfully compared with each other & supported by the Genealogical & Chronological Aid of the Sacred and Profane Writings of the Globe). Ogygia, the island of Calypso in Homer's The Odyssey, was used by Ó Flaithbheartaigh as a poetic allegory for Ireland. Drawing from numerous ancient documents, Ogygia traces Irish history back before Saint Patrick and into Pre-Christian Irish mythology.

Simultaneously, however, Máirtín Mór Ó Máille, who claimed descent from the derbhfine of the last Chief of the Name of the Clan O'Malley and Lord of Umhaill as well as kinship with the famous pirate queen Grace O'Malley, ran much of Anglo-Irish landlord Richard "Humanity Dick" Martin's estates from his residence at "Keeraun House" and the surrounding region, which are still known locally as "the demesne" (Irish: An Diméin), as a "middleman" (Irish: ceithearnach).

From the rock known as "O'Malley's Seat (Irish: Suístín Uí Mháille) at the mouth of the creek known as An Dólain near the village of An Caorán Beag in Carraroe, Ó Máille also ran, with the enthusiastic collusion of his employer, one of the busiest smuggling operations in South Connemara and regularly unloaded cargoes smuggled in from Guernsey. Like many other members of the Gaelic nobility of Ireland before him, Ó Máille was a legendary figure even in his own lifetime, entertaining all guests with several barrels of wine and feasts of roasted sheep and cattle, which were always fully eaten before having to be salted.

This arrangement continued until around 1800. While hosting Rt.-Rev. Edmund Ffrench, the Dominican Warden of Galway and future Roman Catholic Bishop of Kilmacduagh and Kilfenora, however, Máirtín Mór Ó Máille presided over an accidental breach of hospitality. As Warden Ffrench's visit was on a Friday, the Friar's was only eating fish and seafood. When one of the household servants of Máirtín Mór accidentally poured a meat gravy upon his plate, the future Bishop understood that it was unintentional and graciously waved the plate away. The future Bishop's cousin, Thomas Ffrench, however, was less forgiving and demanded satisfaction. This resulted in a duel during which Máirtín Mór was mortally wounded.

Sir Richard Martin, who had not been in Connemara at the time, was shocked and angry to hear of his middleman's death, saying, "Ó Máille preferred a hole in his guts to one in his honour, but there wouldn't have been a hole in either if I'd been told of it!"

Meanwhile another branch of the Gaelic nobility, who claimed descent from the derbhfine of the last O'Flaherty Chiefs, similarly lived in a thatch-covered long house at Renvyle and acted as both clan leaders and "middlemen" for the Anglo-Irish Blake family of Galway City, who were granted much of the region under the Acts of Settlement in 1677. This arrangement continued until 1811, when Henry Blake ended a 130-year-long tradition of his family acting as absentee landlords and evicted 86-year-old Anthony O'Flaherty, his relatives, and his retainers. Henry Blake then demolished Anthony O'Flaherty's longhouse and built Renvyle House on the site.

=== Direct British rule ===
Even though Henry Blake later termed the eviction of Anthony O'Flaherty in Letters from the Irish Highlands, as "the dawn of law in Cunnemara" (sic), the Anglo-Irish Blake family, who remained in the region until the 1920s, are recalled in Connemara, as, "famously bad landlords" with an alleged sense of sexual entitlement regarding the female tenants on their estates and as enthusiastic supporters of the anti-Catholic activities of the local Irish Church Missions, which, "caused much unrest and bitterness".

Local Irish folklore accordingly glorifies a local rapparee known as Scorach Ghlionnáin, who was allegedly born illegitimately in a seaside cave in the Townland of An Tulaigh. He is said to often and successfully have stolen from the Blake family and their land agents and given to the poor, until enlisting in the British Army and losing his life in the Crimean War. The Blake family are also said in the local oral tradition to have been permanently banished from the region by a curse put on them by a local Roman Catholic priest who dabbled in Pre-Christian sorcery. Elsewhere in Connemara, Anglo-Irish landlord John D'Arcy (1785-1839), who bankrupted both himself and his heirs to found the town of Clifden, is recalled much more fondly.

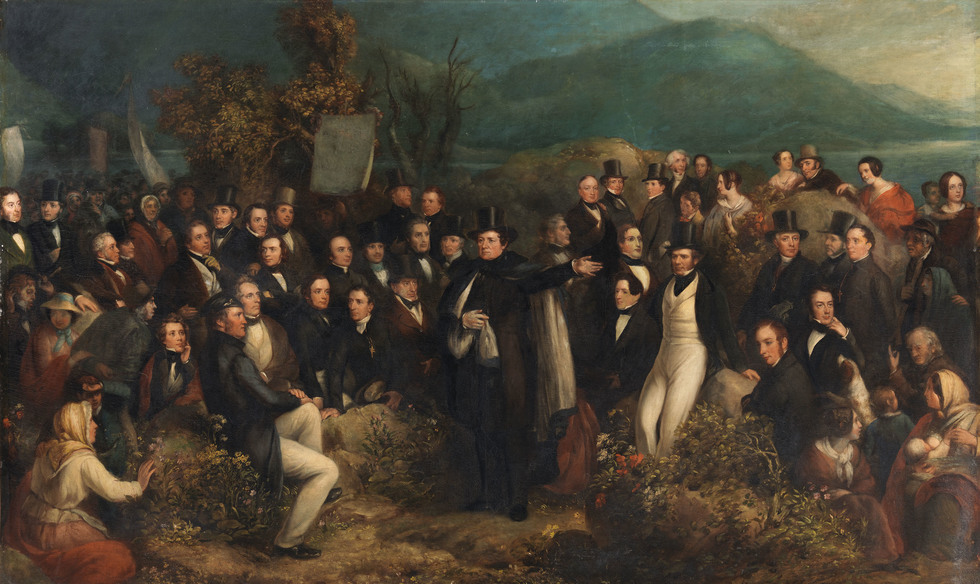
The Monster Meeting at Clifden in 1843 by Joseph Patrick Haverty. Daniel O'Connell is depicted in the centre addressing the gathered masses.

In 1843, Daniel O'Connell, the mastermind of the successful campaign for Catholic emancipation, held a Monster Meeting at Clifden, attended by a crowd reportedly numbering 100,000, before whom he spoke on repeal of the Act of Union.

Connemara was drastically depopulated during the Great Famine in the late 1840s, with the lands of the Anglo-Irish Martin family being greatly affected and the bankrupted landlord being forced to auction off the estate in 1849:

As that year of 1847 had been the worst of several consecutive years of famine, it was to be understood that those missing tenants had abandoned their holdings to crowd into the workhouses or the emigrant ships to the New World, or they were dead; in any case they no longer infested the ground, which was left as a blank canvas on which Capital could paint a fair and profitable landscape.

The Sean nós song Johnny Seoighe is one of the few Irish songs from the era of the Great Famine that still survives. The events of the Great Irish Famine in Connemara have since inspired the recent Irish-language films Black '47, directed by Lance Daly, and Arracht, which was directed by Tomás Ó Súilleabháin.

The Irish Famine of 1879 similarly caused mass starvation, evictions, and violence in Connemara against the abuses of power by local Anglo-Irish landlords, bailiffs, and the Royal Irish Constabulary.

According to Tim Robinson, "Michael Davitt, founder of the Land League... visited An Cheathrú Rua [in 1879] and... found that the tenantry was reduced to eating the seed-potatoes on which the next seasons crop depended. In January 1880 after another tour of Connemara, he reported that the Poor Law Unions of the coastal areas were providing no outdoor relief (i.e. road-building schemes, etc.), and that the people faced starvation in the months before the summer. Not only was potato-blight prevalent, but it seems the kelp market had failed, and for most small tenants of the coastal areas it was the price they got for their kelp that paid the rent."

In response, Father Patrick Grealy, the Roman Catholic priest assigned to Carna, selected ten, "very destitute but industrious and virtuous families", from his parish to emigrate to America and be settled upon frontier homesteads in Moonshine Township, near Graceville, Minnesota, by Bishop John Ireland of the Roman Catholic Diocese of St. Paul.

In 1880 efforts by landlord Martin S. Kirwan to evict his starving tenants resulted in "The Battle of Carraroe" (Irish: Cath na Ceathrú Rua), which Tim Robinson has dubbed, "the most dramatic event of the Land War in Connemara." During the famous battle, Mr. Fenton, the landlord's process server, arrived to serve evictions with the protection and support of an estimated 260 officers of the Royal Irish Constabulary. They were met by the violent resistance of an estimated 2000 members of the local population. Tim Robinson writes, "Local Seanchas has it that there were many unfamiliar faces in the crowd – the dead, come up from the Old graveyard at Barr an Doire to protect the homes of their descendants, it was said." (Irish: "Tá sé sa seanchas áitiúil go raibh éadain strainséartha le feiceáil sa slua – na mairbh a bhí tagtha aníos as an tseanreilig i mBarr an Doire le seantithe a muintire a shábháil, ceaptar.") After escalating violence forced him to retreat to the RIC barracks before completing the third eviction, Mr. Fenton wrote a letter to the land agent at Roundstone (Irish: Cloch na Rón); announcing his refusal to serve more evictions.

According to historian Cormac Ó Comhraí, between the Land War and the First World War, politics in Connemara was largely dominated by the pro-Home Rule Irish Parliamentary Party and its ally, the United Irish League. At the same time, though, despite an almost complete absence of the Sinn Fein political party in Connemara, the militantly anti-monarchist Irish Republican Brotherhood had a number of active units throughout the region. Furthermore, many County Galway veterans of the subsequent Irish War of Independence traced their belief in Irish republicanism to a father or grandfather who had been in the IRB.

The first transatlantic flight, piloted by British aviators John Alcock and Arthur Brown, landed in a boggy area near Clifden in 1919.

=== War of Independence ===
At the beginning of the Irish War of Independence, the IRA in Connemara had active service companies in Shanafaraghaun, Maam, Kilmilkin, Cornamona, Clonbur, Carraroe, Lettermore, Gorumna, Rosmuc, Letterfrack, and Renvyle. The Royal Irish Constabulary (RIC), on the other hand, was based at fortified barracks at Clifden, Letterfrack, Leenane, Clonbur, Rosmuc, and Maam.

IRA veteran Jack Feehan later recalled of the region at the outbreak of the conflict, "In South Connemara from Spiddal to Lettermullen the brewing (of poitín) was very strong and it went out as far as Carna. The people there were against the RIC more or less because they used to search for poitín, save in the Leenane area where the tourists came and Clifden were there were tourists and people who wanted to be friendly to law and good money."

According to both historian Kathleen Villiers-Tuthill and former West Connemara Brigade IRA O/C Peter J. McDonnell, one of the IRA's most valuable intelligence officers during the ensuing conflict was Letterfrack native Jack Conneely, who had served as a Sergeant in the Royal Engineers during the First World War. Following the Armistice, Conneely had returned to Connemara and accepted a position as the driver for the Leenane Hotel. Due to his war record, Conneely was trusted completely by oblivious Special Constables of the Black and Tans. Crown security forces often requested rides from Conneely, who covertly used the opportunity to ask questions about secret military operations during the drive. On one occasion, two Special Constables accepted a ride to Leenane from Conneely without realizing that they were sitting the whole time next to crates filled with guns and ammunition. After dropping both men off, Conneely delivered the arms shipment to a safe house along Killary Harbour, where the arms were picked up and carried by sea to the IRA in County Mayo.

But the national leadership of the Irish Volunteers was so dissatisfied by the inefficiency and internal squabbling of the IRA in Connemara that, in September 1920, Brigade Commandant Peter McDonnell was summoned to a secret meeting at Kilmilkin with IRA Chief of Staff Richard Mulcahy, who promoted MacDonnell on the spot to Officer Commanding of the West Connemara Brigade.

==== Burning of Clifden ====
The assassination of 14 British Intelligence officers from the Cairo Gang in Dublin on Bloody Sunday, was followed by the arrest and court-martial of Connemara-native Thomas Whelan for high treason and the first degree murder of Captain B.T. Baggelly at 119 Lower Baggot Street. Whelan, however, was a Volunteer in the IRA's Dublin Brigade but was not involved with Michael Collins' Squad, which had carried out the assassinations that morning. Therefore, in a break from typical IRA practice in such trials, Whelan recognized the court, pled not guilty, and accepted the services of a defense attorney, who introduced the sworn testimony of multiple alibi witnesses who stated that Whelan had attended a late morning Mass and had been seen to receive Holy Communion in Ringsend on Bloody Sunday. Despite this testimony and the efforts of the Archbishop of Dublin and of Monsignor Joseph MacAlpine, the parish priest of St. Joseph's Roman Catholic Church in Clifden and Irish Parliamentary Party political boss of the surrounding region, to save his life out of a firm believe that he had not been involved in Captain Baggelly's assassination, Whelan was found guilty and subjected to execution by hanging on 14 March 1921.

In retaliation, Peter J. McDonnell and the West Connemara Brigade decided to follow the IRA's "Two for One" policy by assassinating two Royal Irish Constabulary officers in Whelan's birthplace of Clifden, which until then had been, according to Rosmuc IRA commander Colm Ó Gaora, "gach uile lá riamh dílis do dhlí Shasana", ("ever single day that ever was, loyal to England's law").

According to Peter McDonnell, the night of 15 March 1921 was selected, "to go into Clifden, get grub, and have a crack at the patrol." At the time, between 18 and 20 policemen were always stationed in the town. After finding the police had returned to barracks, the IRA withdrew temporarily, spent the night at, "the little lodge of Jim King near Kilcock" (sic), and, on the evening of 16 March 1921, the patrol reentered Clifden from the south. A party of six IRA men then approached RIC Constables Charles Reynolds and Thomas Sweeney near "Eddie King's Pub". McDonnell later recalled, "I saw two RIC against Eddie King's window and they noticed us. One of them made a dive for his gun as I passed and we wheeled and opened up. They were shot." As both officers lay dying, the IRA men were seen to bend over them and remove their weapons and ammunition, before withdrawing from the scene with other RIC Constables in pursuit.

Peter Joseph McDonnell later recalled, "They had a rifle and a revolver, fifty rounds of ammo, and belts and pouches." Canon Joseph MacAlpine was immediately summoned and gave both Constables the Last Rites before their deaths.

Believing that an attack on their barracks was imminent, the Clifden RIC sent out a request for assistance over Clifden's Trans-Atlantic Marconi wireless station. In a British war crime that is still known as "The Burning of Clifden" and in response to the request, a trainload of "Special Constables" from the Black and Tans arrived via the Galway to Clifden railway in the early hours of St Patrick's Day, 17 March 1921. While making a half-hearted search for Sinn Féin supporters, the Tans committed arson and burned down fourteen houses and businesses. Other Clifden residents later testified about being beaten and robbed at gunpoint and were granted compensation by the courts. John J. McDonnell, a decorated former sergeant major in the Connaught Rangers during World War I, was shot dead by security forces; most likely for the incorrigibly bad luck of having the same surname as the O.C. of the IRA West Connemara Brigade. Local businessman Peter Clancy was shot in the face and neck, but survived. Before leaving the town, British security forces left graffiti outside Eddie King's pub, "Clifden will remember and so will the RIC", as well as, "Shoot another member of the RIC and up goes the town".

==== The Kilmilkin ambush ====
In the Irish folklore of Connemara, it was often said that one of last battles in a successful struggle for Irish independence would be fought in the hills near Kilmilkin. The IRA West Connemara Brigade's ambush of a Royal Irish Constabulary convoy on 21 April 1921 was later seen as the fulfilment of that legend.

=== Irish Civil War ===
==== The Truce ====
Shortly after the signing of the Anglo-Irish Treaty on 6 December 1921, Connaught IRA commanders Peter J. McDonnell, Jack Feehan, and Michael Kilroy had a meeting with Michael Collins at the Gaelic League headquarters. McDonnell later recalled, "There was a conference on and he (Collins) had arranged to meet us. Jack had been in Dublin as he was the Divisional Quartermaster and he told us why we should accept the Treaty for we out of ammunition and the only choice we had was to accept the Treaty. All he wanted himself, Collins said, was to accept the Treaty for six months, get in arms, and then we could tell the British to go to blazes. We couldn't carry on the fight for we had no hope of carrying it out successfully. I represented West Connemara, was Brigade O/C and Deputy O/C of the Division; Jack Feehan was Divisional Quartermaster; Michael Kilroy, O/C Western Division there. We told Collins we didn't agree with what he said and he didn't say much."

In the lead up to the Irish Civil War, Pro-Treaty rallies were held in Clifden, Roundstone, and Cashel, while a massive anti-Treaty rally was addressed by Éamon de Valera at Market Square in Oughterard on 23 April 1922.

Following the anti-Treaty IRA's occupation of the Four Courts in Dublin on 13 April 1922, however, local anti-Treaty IRA units took action to raise money by simultaneous armed robbery of the post offices in Ballyconneely, Clifden, and Cleggan on Good Friday. Furthermore, after Anglo-Irish landlord Talbott Clifton fled the country following a gun battles against local anti-Treaty IRA members, his home at Kylemore House was requisitioned and barricaded against expected attack by soldiers from the newly founded Irish Army. Mark O'Malley later recalled that he deeply regretted that the anti-Treaty IRA never found Mr. Clifton's supply of guns and ammunition, which were widely believed to be hidden nearby.

==== Hostilities ====
Renvyle House was burned down by the Anti-Treaty IRA during the Irish Civil War, but later rebuilt by Oliver St John Gogarty and turned into a hotel.

== Geography ==
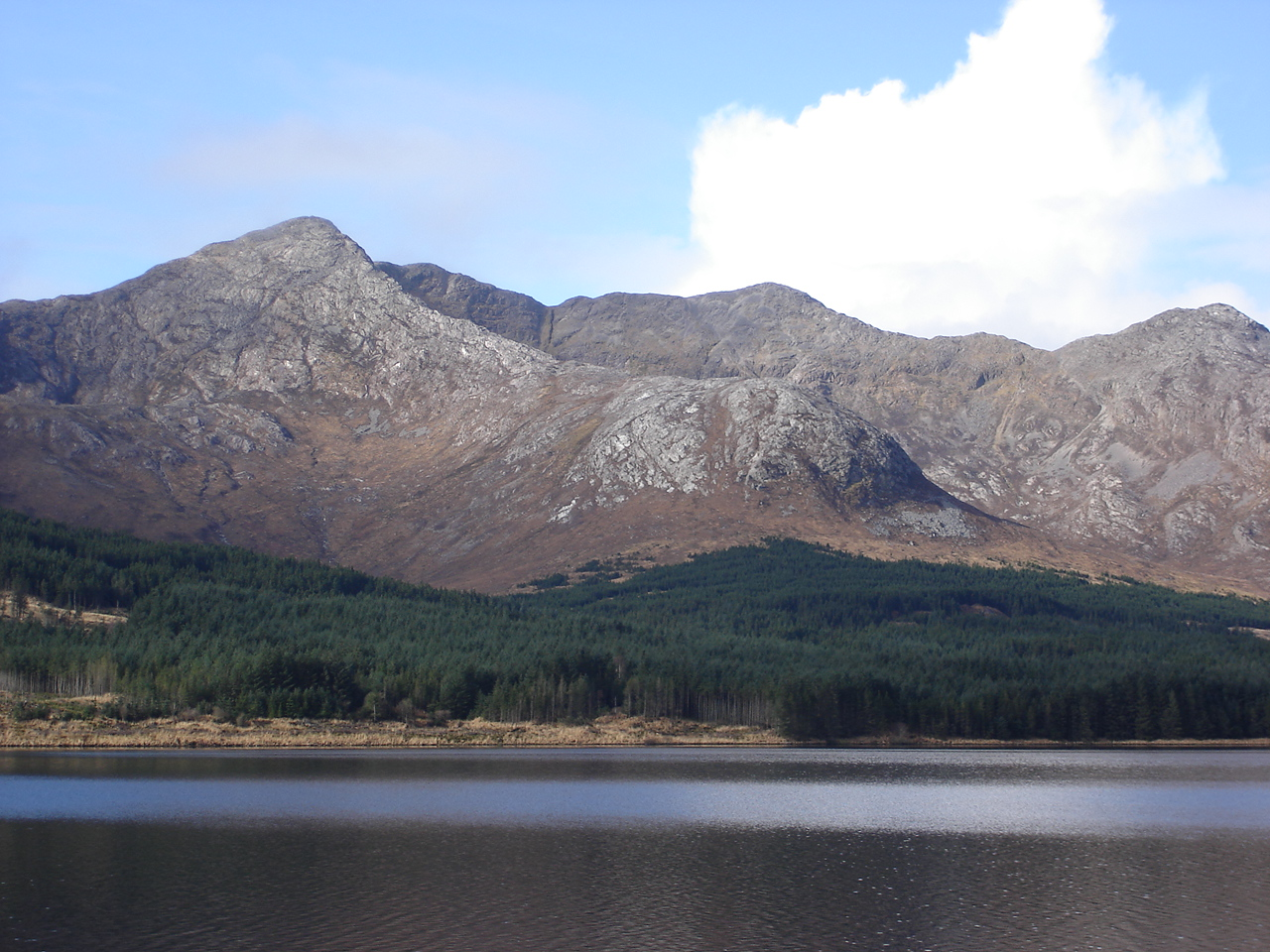
Twelve Bens

Connemara lies in the territory of Iar Connacht, "West Connacht," within the portion of County Galway west of Lough Corrib, and was traditionally divided into North Connemara and South Connemara. The mountains of the Twelve Bens and the Owenglin River, which flows into the sea at An Clochán / Clifden, marked the boundary between the two parts. Connemara is bounded on the west, south and north by the Atlantic Ocean. In at least some definitions, Connemara's land boundary with the rest of County Galway is marked by the Invermore River otherwise known as Inbhear Mór (which flows into the north of Kilkieran Bay), Loch Oorid (which lies a few kilometres west of Maam Cross) and the western spine of the Maumturks mountains. In the north of the mountains, the boundary meets the sea at Killary, a few kilometres west of Leenaun.

The coast of Connemara is made up of multiple peninsulas. The peninsula of Iorras Ainbhtheach (sometimes corrupted to Iorras Aithneach) in the south is the largest and contains the villages of Carna and Kilkieran. The peninsula of Errismore consists of the area west of the village of Ballyconneely. Errisbeg peninsula lies to the south of the village of Roundstone. The Errislannan peninsula lies just south of the town of Clifden. The peninsulas of Kingstown, Coolacloy, Aughrus, Cleggan and Renvyle are found in Connemara's north-west. Connemara includes numerous islands, the largest of which is Inis mór which is the biggest island, County Galway Inis mór; other islands include Omey, Inishark, High Island, Friars Island, Feenish and Maínis.

The territory contains the civil parishes of Moyrus, Ballynakill, Omey, Ballindoon and Inishbofin (the last parish was for a time part of the territory of the Clann Uí Mháille, the O Malley Lords of Umhaill, County Mayo), and the Roman Catholic parishes of Carna, Clifden (Omey and Ballindoon), Ballynakill, Kilcumin (Oughterard and Rosscahill), Roundstone and Inishbofin.

== Irish language, literature, and folklore ==
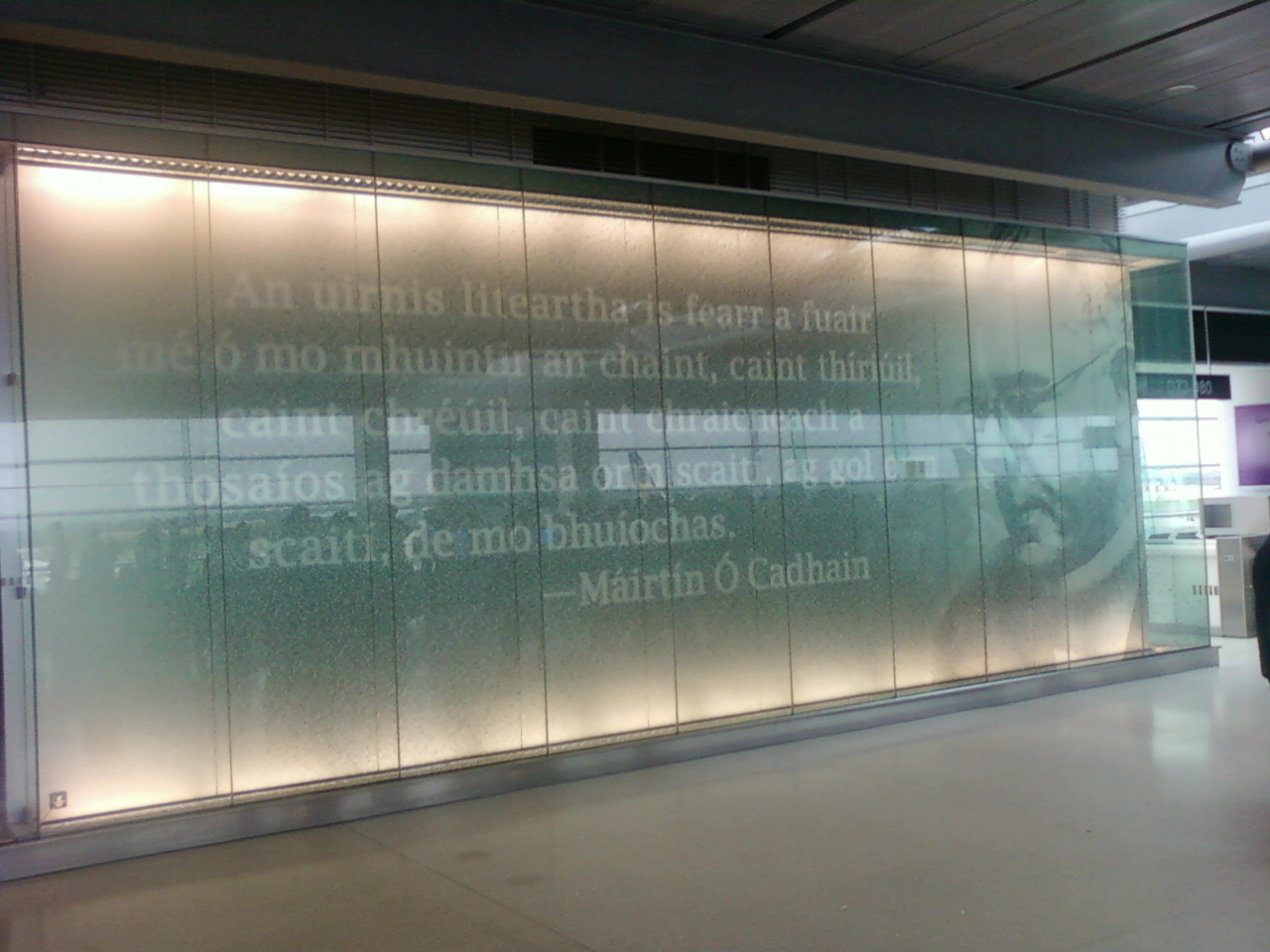
Memorial to Irish language activist and novelist Máirtín Ó Cadhain inside Dublin Airport: "The best literary tool I got from my folks is the language – a homely, earthy, polished language that may at times start me dancing and at times start me weeping, sometimes despite myself."

The population of Connemara is 32,000. There are between 20,000–24,000 native Irish speakers in the region, making it the largest Irish-speaking Gaeltacht. The Enumeration Districts with the most Irish speakers in all of Ireland, as a percentage of population, can be seen in the South Connemara area. Those of school age (5–19 years old) are the most likely to be identified as speakers.

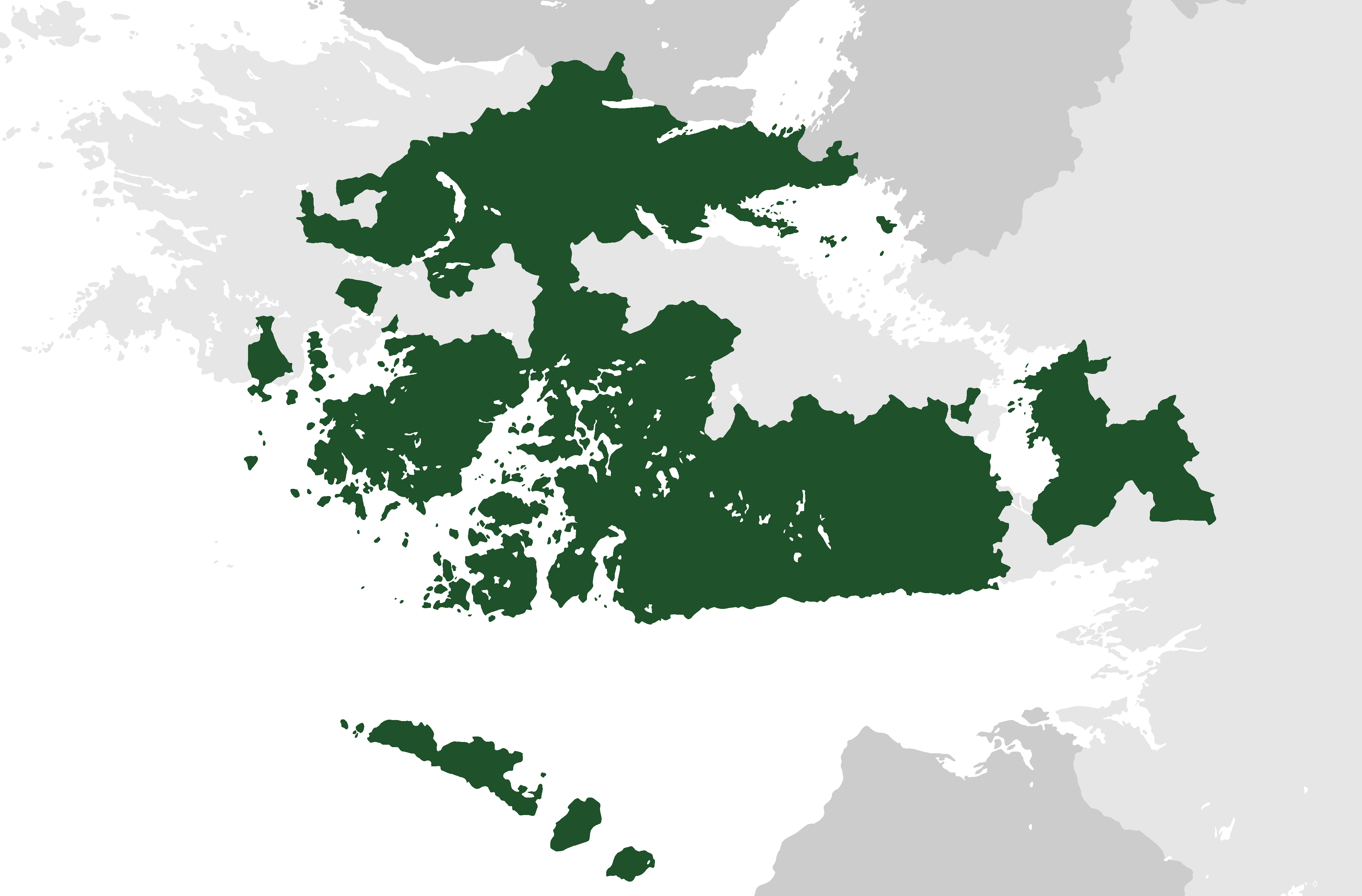
The Gaeltacht regions of County Galway in green. The majority of Galway's Gaeltacht is located in Connemara.

Writing in 1994, John Ardagh described "the Galway Gaeltacht" of South Connemara, as a region, "where narrow bumpy roads lead from one little whitewashed village to another, through a rough landscape of green hills, bogs, and little lakes, past a straggling coast of deep inlets and tiny rocky islands." Due the many close similarities between the landscape, language, history, and culture of West County Galway with those of the Gàidhealtachd of Scotland, the Connemara Gaeltacht during the Victorian era was often called "The Irish Highlands". Connemara has accordingly wielded an enormous influence upon Irish culture, literature, mythology, and folklore.

Micheál Mac Suibhne (c. 1760–1820), a Connacht Irish bard mainly associated with Cleggan, remains a locally revered figure, due to his genius level contribution to oral poetry, Modern literature in Irish, and sean-nós singing in Connacht Irish. Mac Suibhne was born near the ruined Abbey of Cong, then part of County Galway, but now in County Mayo. The names of his parents are not recorded, but his ancestors are said to have migrated from Ulster as refugees from the Cromwellian conquest of Ireland.

He spent most of his life in Connemara and is said to have been a heavy drinker. Micheál Mac Suibhne and his brother Toirdhealbhach are said to have moved to the civil parish of Ballinakill, between Letterfrack and Clifden, where the poet was employed as a blacksmith by an Anglo-Irish landlord named Steward. It is not known whether Mac Suibhne ever married, but he is believed to have died in poverty at Fahy, near Clifden, around the year 1820. His burial place, however, remains unknown.

In 1846, James Hardiman wrote of Micheál Mac Suibhne: "By the English-speaking portion of the people, Mac Sweeney was the 'Bard of the West.' He composed, in his native language, several poems and songs of considerable merit; which have become such favourites, that there are few who cannot repeat some of them from memory. Many of these have been collected by the Editor; and if space shall permit, one or more of the most popular will be inserted in the Additional Notes, as a specimen of modern Irish versification, and of those compositions which afford so much social pleasure to the good people of Iar-Connacht." In his "Additional Notes to Iar or West Connacht" (1846), Hardiman published the full texts of Abhrán an Phúca, the Banais Pheigi Ní Eaghra (commonly known under the English title "The Connemara Wedding"), and Eóghain Cóir (lit. "Honest Owen"), a mock-lament over the recent death of a notoriously corrupt and widely disliked land agent. Following the Irish War of Independence and Irish Civil War, Professor Tomás Ó Máille collected from the local oral tradition, edited, and published all of Micheál Mac Suibhne's poems in 1934.

After emigrating from Connemara to the United States during the 1860s, Bríd Ní Mháille, a Bard in the Irish language outside Ireland and sean-nós singer from the village of Trá Bhán, Isle of Garmna, composed the caoine Amhrán na Trá Báine. The song is about the drowning of her three brothers after their currach was rammed and sunk while they were out at sea. Ní Mháille's lament for her brothers was first performed at a ceilidh in South Boston, Massachusetts before being brought back to Connemara, where it is considered an Amhrán Mór ("Big Song") and remains a very popular song among both performers and fans of both sean-nós singing and Irish traditional music.

During the Gaelic revival, Irish teacher and nationalist Patrick Pearse, who would go on to lead the 1916 Easter Rising before being executed by firing squad, owned a cottage at Rosmuc, where he spent his summers learning the Irish language and writing. According to Innti poet and literary critic Louis de Paor, despite Pearse's enthusiasm for the Conamara Theas dialect of Connacht Irish spoken around his summer cottage, he chose to follow the usual practice of the Gaelic revival by writing in Munster Irish, which was considered less Anglicized than other Irish dialects. At the same time, however, Pearse's reading of the radically experimental poetry of Walt Whitman and of the French Symbolists led him to introduce Modernist poetry into the Irish language. As a literary critic, Pearse also left behind a very detailed blueprint for the decolonization of Irish literature, particularly in the Irish language.

During the aftermath of the Irish War of Independence and the Civil War, Connemara was a major center for the work of the Irish Folklore Commission in recording Ireland's endangered folklore, mythology, and oral literature. According to folklore collector and archivist Seán Ó Súilleabháin, residents with no stories to tell were the exception rather than the rule and it was generally conceded in 1935 that there were more unrecorded folktales in the parish of Carna alone than anywhere else in Western Europe.

One of the most important tradition bearers the Commission recorded in Connemara or anywhere else was Éamon a Búrc. Before his repertoire of tales was recorded and transcribed, a Búrc had emigrated to America and lived in Graceville, Minnesota and in the Connemara Patch shantytown in the Twin Cities while working for the Great Northern Railway of James J. Hill. After returning lamed to his native Carna, Éamon a Búrc became a tailor and was recorded by Séamus Ó Duilearga and Liam MacCoisdeala in 1935 at the home now owned the Ó Cuaig family. According to folklorist Seán Ó Súilleabháin, "Éamonn a Búrc was possibly the most accomplished narrator of folktales who has lived into our time. His artistry is at once evident in any of the tales which fill the two thousand pages of manuscript recorded from him by Mac Coisdeala. One of his hero tales, Eochair, mac Rí in Éirinn, recorded in October 1938, filled twenty-two Ediphone cylinders, that is, over 26,000 words." Furthermore, according to Irish-American historian Bridget Connelly, the stories collected in Irish from Éamon a Búrc are still taught in University courses alongside Beowulf, the Elder Edda and the Homeric Hymns.

Joe Heaney a legendary seanchai and sean-nós singer in Connacht Irish, is said to have known more than 500 songs – most learned from his family while he was growing up in Carna.

After hearing Heaney’s first public performance in Dublin of a famous work of Christian poetry about the Crucifixion of Jesus from the Connemara oral tradition, Máirtín Ó Cadhain wrote, "In Caoineadh na dtrí Muire he brings home to us the joys and sorrows of Mary with the intimacy and poignancy of a Fra Angelico painting."

The Féile Chomórtha Joe Éinniú (Joe Heaney Commemorative Festival) is held every year in Carna.

Sorcha Ní Ghuairim, a Sean-nós singer and writer of Modern literature in Irish, was also born in Connemara. Initially a newspaper columnist termed ‘Coisín Siúlach’ for the newspaper The Irish Press, where she eventually became the editor. She also wrote a regular column for the children's page under the pen name ‘Niamh Chinn Óir’. Her other writings included a series of children's stories titled Eachtraí mhuintir Choinín and Sgéal Taimín Mhic Luiche. With the assistance of Pádraig Ó Concheanainn, Sorcha also translated Charles McGuinness' Viva Irlanda for publication in the newspaper. Their translation was subsequently published under the title Ceathrar comrádaí in 1943.

While living at Inverin, Connemara during the Emergency, however, Calum Maclean, the brother of highly important Scottish Gaelic poet Sorley MacLean, was appointed by Professor Séamus Ó Duilearga (1899–1980) as a part-time collector for the Irish Folklore Commission (Coimisiún Béaloideasa Éireann). From August 1942 to February 1945, Maclean sent a considerable amount of lore in the local Conamara Theas dialect of Connaught Irish to the Commission, amounting to six bound volumes. From March 1945 Maclean was employed as a temporary cataloguer by the Commission in Dublin, before being sent to the Scottish Gàidhealtachd to collect folklore there as well, first for the Irish Folklore Commission and later for the School of Scottish Studies.

While interned during the Second World War in the Curragh Camp by Taoiseach Éamon de Valera, Máirtín Ó Cadhain, a Post-Civil War IRA member from An Spidéal, became one of the most radically innovative writers of Modern literature in Irish by writing the comic and modernist literary classic Cré na Cille.

The novel is written almost entirely as conversation between the dead bodies buried underneath a Connemara cemetery. In a departure from Patrick Pearse's idealization of the un-Anglicised Irish culture of the Gaeltachtaí, the deceased speakers in Cré na Cille spend the whole novel continuing the quarrels from when they were still alive: gossiping, backbiting, flirting, feuding, and scandal-mongering.

According to William Brennan, the manuscript for Cré na Cille was turned town by the first publisher to whom it was submitted, allegedly for being too reminiscent of the bawdy writings of James Joyce. Máirtín Ó Cadhain, however, was not put off. "In 1949", according to Brennan, "the Irish Press serialized it nationally over seven months, and the following year, the boutique publisher Sáirséal agus Dill released a bound version. The book became the talk of the Irish-speaking world. Young Irish speakers read it aloud to their illiterate grandparents — in Galway, according to one writer, college students passed the thrice-weekly Irish Press installments from hand to hand, and scrounged to buy the book when it appeared in stores."

Cré na Cille is widely considered a masterpiece of 20th-century Irish literature and has drawn comparisons to the writings of Flann O’Brien, Samuel Beckett and James Joyce.

Through Cré na Cille and his other writings, Máirtín Ó Cadhain became a major part of the revival of literary modernism in Irish, where it had been largely dormant since the execution of Patrick Pearse in 1916. Ó Cadhain created a literary language for his writing out of the Conamara Theas and Cois Fharraige dialects of Connacht Irish, but he was often accused of an unnecessarily dialectal usage in grammar and orthography even in contexts where realistic depiction of the Connemara vernacular was not called for. He was also happy to experiment with borrowings from other dialects, Classical Irish and even Scottish Gaelic. Consequently, much of what Ó Cadhain wrote is, like the poetry of fellow Linguistic experimentalist Liam S. Gógan, reputedly very hard to understand for a non-native speaker.

In addition to his writings, Máirtín Ó Cadhain was also instrumental in preaching what he called Athghabháil na hÉireann ("Re-Conquest of Ireland"), (meaning both decolonization and re-Gaelicisation). In an interview before his death, Ó Cadhain said, "If we lose the Irish language, we lose our native literature, we’ll be finished as a people. The vision that every generation of Irish people had will be at an end."

With this in mind, Ó Cadhain spearheaded the 1969 founding of Coiste Cearta Síbialta na Gaeilge (English: Irish Language Civil Rights Committee"), a pressure group campaigning for social, economic and cultural rights for native-speakers of the Irish-language both inside and outside of traditional Gaeltacht areas and which repeatedly emulated the direct action and civil disobedience tactics used by the contemporary Welsh Language Society, the Northern Ireland civil rights movement, and the American civil rights movement.

One of their most successful protests involved the pirate radio station Saor Raidió Chonamara (Free Radio Connemara) which first came on the air during Oireachtas na Gaeilge 1968, as a direct challenge to both the Irish government's monopoly over the airwaves and, far more importantly, their deliberate inaction regarding Irish language broadcasting. The station used a medium wave transmitter smuggled in from the Netherlands. The Irish government responded by proposing a national Irish-language radio station RTÉ Raidió na Gaeltachta which came on the air on Easter Sunday 1972. Its headquarters are now in Casla.

In 1974, Gluaiseacht also persuaded Conradh na Gaeilge to end the practice since 1939 of always holding Oireachtas na Gaeilge, a cultural and literary festival modeled after the Welsh Eisteddfod, in Dublin rather than in the Gaeltacht areas. Gluaisceart also successfully secured recognition of sean-nós dance in 1977.

While employed as a Navvy, or construction worker, in 1950s England and rebuilding the cities of Northampton, Coventry, and London, following the destruction of The Blitz, Dónall Mac Amhlaigh, a native of Barna, kept an Irish-language diary describing days spent at manual labour followed by nights of Ceilidh dances and Sean-nos songs in the pubs, which he later published in 1960 as, Dialann Deoraí. It was translated into English by Valentine Iremonger and published in 1964 under the title An Irish Navvy: The Diary of an Exile.

Another figure important to Modern literature in Irish to come out of Connemara was Casla-born poet, actress, Irish-language activist, and Sean nós singer Caitlín Maude (1941-1982). According to Louis de Paor,

Although no collection of her work was published during her lifetime, Caitlín Maude had a considerable influence on Irish language poetry and poets, including Máirtín Ó Direáin, Micheál Ó hArtnéide, Tomás Mac Síomóin, and Nuala Ní Dhomhnaill. That influence is a measure of the dramatic force of her personality, her exemplary ingenuity and commitment to the language, and her ability as a singer to embody the emotional disturbance at the heart of a song. Her collected poems are relatively slight, including incomplete drafts and fragments, but reveal a poetic voice confident of its own authority, drawing on the spoken language of the Connemara Gaeltacht but rarely on its conventions of oral composition or, indeed, on precedents in Irish poetry in either language. The best of her work is closer to the American poetry of the 1960s in its use of looser forms that follow the rhythms of the spoken word and the sense of the poem as direct utterance without artifice, a technique requiring a high degree of linguistic precision and formal control.

Maude also led the successful Gluaiseacht Chearta Sibhialta na Gaeltachta direct action campaign that forced the Irish State to open an experimental Irish-language immersion school, Scoil Santain, in the Dublin suburb of Tallaght. This experiment has been successfully duplicated in countless other English-speaking communities throughout Ireland, with an overwhelming record of success as a tool of language revival.

The Connaught Irish memoirs of Colm Ó Gaora, the former IRA company commander in Rosmuc during the Irish War of Independence, were published in 2008 under the title Mise. An English translation, under the title On the Run: The Story of an Irish Freedom Fighter, was published in Cork City by Mercier Press in 2011.

Recently, the Coláiste Lurgan, a language immersion summer college located at Inverin, has won worldwide acclaim for their Irish language covers of pop songs, including Leonard Cohen's Hallelujah, Adele's Hello, and Avicii's Wake Me Up, on the TG Lurgan YouTube channel. The band Seo Linn is composed of musicians who met at the college.

Writing in 1994, John Ardagh recalled, "One night I attended a Sean Nós festival in a crowded village pub in Carraroe – local people all talking Irish, singing in turn their solo ballads, semi-improvised, with strange, almost oriental rhythms. There were microphones, videos, and girls in jeans; yet in some ways it might have been a century ago. I felt in the presence of an alien culture, so different from the world of modern Dublin; and I asked myself whether this was the true Ireland, or something today irrelevant to it. I also felt sad that the English and Irish had long ago conspired to marginalize this beautiful Celtic language."

John Ardagh also conceded, though, that the Gaeilgeoir community of Galway City, which, "today sees itself as the Gaelic capital of Ireland, and has been filling up with intellectual enthusiasts similar to those who have been leading the language revival in Dublin", benefits enormously from their proximity to the Connemara Gaeltacht. The Gaeilgeoirí of Galway City, where, "Irish is often heard in the streets," and which, "has a flourishing little Irish language theatre", often "make pilgrimages" to the rural Gaeltacht to, "drink at the fountains of its culture", attend its summer cultural festivals, and further perfect their knowledge of the Irish language by conversing with native speakers.

From a literary perspective, one of the most important Galway City Gaeilgeoir activists is Irish language poet and William Shakespeare enthusiast Muiris Sionóid, who later recalled,

It was during the following and final phase of my education at University College Galway, now NUIG, that I formed in-dissoluble friendships with a host of Irish speakers, mostly from Connemara and the Aran Islands, holidaying regularly with families there especially with that of my great friend, Michael Powell, of Eochaill, Inis Mór. During that period among those wonderfully hospitable and golden-hearted people Irish became by dint of constant loving use what I had always fervently wished it to be, my mind’s first language. Thereafter throughout my years as a teacher of Mathematics and the Sciences, and as husband and father, my love of poetry, in English and Irish and indeed in Latin and a number of other European languages, though never waning, could naturally find no outlet − until early retirement beckoned. No bard, Irish or English, had been found fit in all this while to dethrone the mighty songster of Avonside in my Kingdom of Poetry.

In 2009, Sionóid published a translation of Shakespeare's 154 sonnets into Connaught Irish under the title Rotha Mór an Ghrá ("The Great Wheel of Love").

== Transport ==
Connemara is accessible by the Bus Éireann and City Link bus services. From 1895 to 1935 it was served by the Midland Great Western Railway branch that connected Galway City to Clifden.

The N59 is the main area road, following an inland route from Galway to Clifden. A popular alternative is the coastal route beginning with the R336 from Galway. This is also known as the Connemara Loop consisting of a 45 km drive where one can view the landscape and scenery of Connemara.

Aer Arann Islands serves the Aran Islands from Connemara Airport in the south of Connemara also known as Aerfort na Minna.

== Notable places ==
=== Towns and villages ===
These settlements are within the most extensive definition of the area. More restrictive definitions will exclude some:

- Barna – (Bearna)
- Ballyconneely – (Baile Conaola / Baile Mhic Chonghaile)
- Ballynahinch – (Baile na hInse)
- Carna – (Cárna)
- Carraroe – (An Cheathrú Rua)
- Claddaghduff – (An Cladach Dubh)
- Cleggan – (An Cloigeann)
- Clifden – (An Clochán)
- Clonbur – (An Fhairche)
- Inverin – (Indreabhán)
- Kilkerren – (Cill Chiaráin)
- Leenaun – (An Lionán / Leenane)
- Letterfrack – (Leitir Fraic)
- Lettermore – (Leitir Móir)
- Lettermullan – (Leitir Mealláin)
- Maum – (An Mám, also Maam)
- Oughterard – (Uachtar Ard)
- Recess – (Sraith Salach)
- Renvyle – (Rinn Mhaoile)
- Rosmuc – (Ros Muc)
- Rossaveal – (Ros an Mhíl)
- Roundstone – (Cloch na Rón)
- Spiddal – (An Spidéal)

=== Islands ===
- Omey Island – (Iomaidh)
- Inishbofin – (Inis Bó Finne) has been home to fishermen, farmers, exiled monks and fugitive pirates for over 6,000 years and today the island supports a population of 200 full-time residents.

== Notable people ==
- Seán 'ac Dhonncha (1919–1996), sean-nós singer
- Nan Tom Teaimín de Búrca, local sean-nós singer, lives near Carna in Rusheenamanagh
- Róisín Elsafty, sean-nós singer
- John Ford, American film director, and winner of 4 Academy Awards, whose real name was Seán O'Feeney, was the son of John Augustine Feeney from An Spidéal, and directed the classic film The Quiet Man in nearby Cong, County Mayo.
- Máire Geoghegan-Quinn, politician, and was the former European Commissioner for Research, Innovation and Science was born in Carna.
- Claire Hanna, SDLP MP in Westminster was born here.
- J. Bruce Ismay, Chairman of the White Star Line, which owned the Titanic, lived for part of his later life in his lodge in Connemara. Ismay was on board the Titanic when it sank but was one of the survivors.
- Seán Mannion, professional boxer who fought for the WBA, was born in Rosmuc.
- Patrick Nee, Rosmuc-born Irish-American organized crime figure turned Irish republican, senior member of the Mullen Gang, and mastermind of an enormous arms trafficking ring to the Provisional IRA from bases in Charlestown, South Boston, and Gloucester, Massachusetts and which paid protection money to local crime boss Whitey Bulger.
- Sorcha Ní Ghuairim (1911–1976), teacher, writer of modern literature in Irish, and sean-nós singer.
- Peter O'Toole, actor of stage and screen, who achieved international stardom in 1962 playing Col. T. E. Lawrence in Lawrence of Arabia, was born in Connemara in 1932, according to some accounts of his life.
- K. S. Ranjitsinhji, Maharaja Jam Sahib of Nawanagar State in British India, was the first head of state to make an official visit to the newly founded Irish Free State, bought Ballynahinch Castle estate and visited the area every year till his death in 1932.
- Major John Riley, an Irish Catholic soldier from Clifden, who deserted from the United States Army over anti-Catholicism in the United States and religious persecution by White Anglo-Saxon Protestant officers. Riley became a Major in the Mexican Army and the commanding officer of the highly decorated Saint Patrick's Battalion during the Mexican–American War.
- Tim Robinson (1935–2020), English cartographer, who lived for many years in Connemara and published books on the area.
- Gráinne Seoige, TV presenter and journalist, who has worked for TG4, RTÉ, Sky News Ireland and the BBC, is a native of An Spidéal.
- Síle Seoige, TV presenter and journalist. She is the younger sister of Gráinne Seoige and a fellow native of An Spidéal
- Mairtin Thornton, heavyweight boxer, nicknamed the "Connemara Chrusher", he was the Irish Heavyweight boxing champion in 1943, and fought Bruce Woodcock for the British heavyweight title in 1945.

== Cultural references ==
- Connemara Wedding is a poem written by Micheál Mac Suibhne (c. 1760–1820)
- French singer Michel Sardou had an international hit with the song "Les Lacs du Connemara" in 1981.
- The Irish drinking song "The Hills of Connemara" has been recorded and performed by a number of Irish and Celtic-themed bands.
- Poet Carl Sandburg's home of 22 years in Flat Rock, North Carolina, which is now a national monument, is named after the Connemara region.
- Conamara Chaos is a region of chaotic terrain on Jupiter's moon Europa.
- The Connemara pony is a breed of horse native to the region. The only native pony breed in Ireland.
- Connemara is also the name of a brand of Irish whiskey produced at the Cooley Distillery.

=== Annalistic references ===
- 807. A slaughter was made of the Conmaicni by the foreigners.

=== Film and TV ===
- The Quiet Man, 1952, film by John Ford
- The Field, 1990, film by Jim Sheridan
- Yu Ming Is Ainm Dom, 2003, short film by Daniel O'Hara
- Cré na Cille, 2007, film by Robert Quinn
- The Guard, 2011, film by John Michael McDonagh
- Black '47, 2018, film by Lance Daly
- Arracht, 2019, film by Tomás Ó Súilleabháin

=== Literature ===
- Mícheál Mac Suibhne, agus Filidh an tSéibhe, 1934, poetry collection, edited by Tomas Ó Maille, Dublin, Foils. an Rialtais,
- Cré na Cille, 1949, novel, by Máirtín Ó Cadhain,
- The Beauty Queen of Leenane, 1996, play by Martin McDonagh
- A Skull in Connemara, 1997, play by Martin McDonagh
- Star of the Sea, 2011, novel by Joseph O'Connor
- The Crow of Connemara, 2015, novel by Stephen Leigh
- Secrets of the Lighthouse, 2015, by Santa Montefiore

== See also ==
- Alcock and Brown's first non-stop flight across the Atlantic crash landed near Clifden
- Ceantar na nOileán
- Connacht Irish
- Connemara Heritage & History Centre
- Connemara National Park
- Connemara Public Library, Chennai, India
- Joyce Country
- Lough Corrib
- The Twelve Pins and Maumturks mountains
- The Western Way (Long-distance trail)
- The Connemara Pony
- Wild Atlantic Way
- Lord Connemara
