= George Ó Máille =

Irish smuggler

George Ó Máille (1785–1865), an Irish smuggler, was born in Keelkyle, Connemara, the son of Padraig Ó Máille, a tenant of Richard "Humanity Dick" Martin, whose family had long provided protection for the trade. George operated from Ballynakill to the Channel Islands, and was the subject of many stories, songs and poems during and after his lifetime.

== See also ==
Other members of the clan involved included Máirtín Mór Ó Máille, who was killed in a duel. His namesake, Mayor of Boston Martin O'Malley, is likewise descended from Connemara Ó Máille's. The most infamous member of the clan was Grace O'Malley, c. 1530 – c. 1603.
