= Máirtín Mór Ó Máille =

Máirtín Mór Ó Máille, alias Máilleach an Chaoráin (d.c. 1800), was an Irish smuggler and duelist from Connemara, who claimed descent from the derbhfine of the last Chief of the Name of the Clan O'Malley and Lord of Umhaill and kinship with the pirate queen Grace O'Malley.

In 1794 Mansergh St. George claimed that local Anglo-Irish landlord and politician Richard "Humanity Dick" Martin of Connemara allowed a man called "O'Malley or O'Mealey ... to live in a state of permanent defence of part of the Martin estate, a tiny peninsula located between Greatman's Bay and Costello Bay. ... [he] was the acknowledged head of the Connemara smugglers ... an associate and creditor of Humanity Dick and a popular figure with the inhabitants of Carraroe because of his lavish hospitality and ingratiating ways."

At the rock known as "O'Malley's Seat (Irish: Suístín Uí Mháille) at the mouth of the creek known as An Dólain near the village of An Caorán Beag in Carraroe, Ó Máille ran one of the busiest smuggler's hideouts in South Connemara and regularly unloaded cargoes smuggled in from Guernsey. Like many other members of the Gaelic nobility of Ireland before him, Ó Máille was a legendary figure even in his own lifetime, entertaining all guests with several barrels of wine and feasts of roasted sheep and cattle, which were always fully eaten before having to be salted.

Máirtín Mór and Richard Martin both conspired to keep English law out of Connemara, at least whenever it suited themselves. As Martin was in a regular state of financial embarrassment, he found Ó Máille's credit to be useful. Martin was also one of the best customers of Ó Máille's smuggling operations. O Máille accordingly ran much of the Martin family's estates from his residence at "Keeraun House" and the surrounding region known as "the demesne (Irish: An Diméin), as a "middleman" (Irish: ceithearnach).

== Death and legacy ==
While hosting Rt.-Rev. Edmund Ffrench, the Dominican Roman Catholic Warden of Galway and future Bishop of Kilmacduagh and Kilfenora, around 1800, however, Máirtín Mór Ó Máille presided over an accidental breach of hospitality. As Warden Ffrench's visit was on a Friday, the clergyman was only eating fish and seafood. When one of the household servants of Máirtín Mór accidentally poured a meat gravy upon the fish upon his plate, the future Bishop understood that it was unintentional and graciously waved the plate away. The Bishop's cousin, Sir Thomas Ffrench, however, was less forgiving and demanded satisfaction. This resulted in a duel in which Máirtín Mór was mortally wounded.

Sir Richard Martin, who had not been in Connemara at the time, was shocked and angry to hear of his death, saying:

Ó Máille preferred a hole in his guts to one in his honor, but there wouldn't have been a hole in either if I'd been told of it!

It is believed that it was following the death of Máirtín Mór that his family migrated from An Caorán Beag to Cill Éinne in the Aran Islands, where the family patriarch became known as "The O'Malley of the Hill."

== See also ==
- Grace O'Malley
- George Ó Máille
