= Conamara Chaos =

Region on Europa

Coordinates: 9.7°N 87.3°E

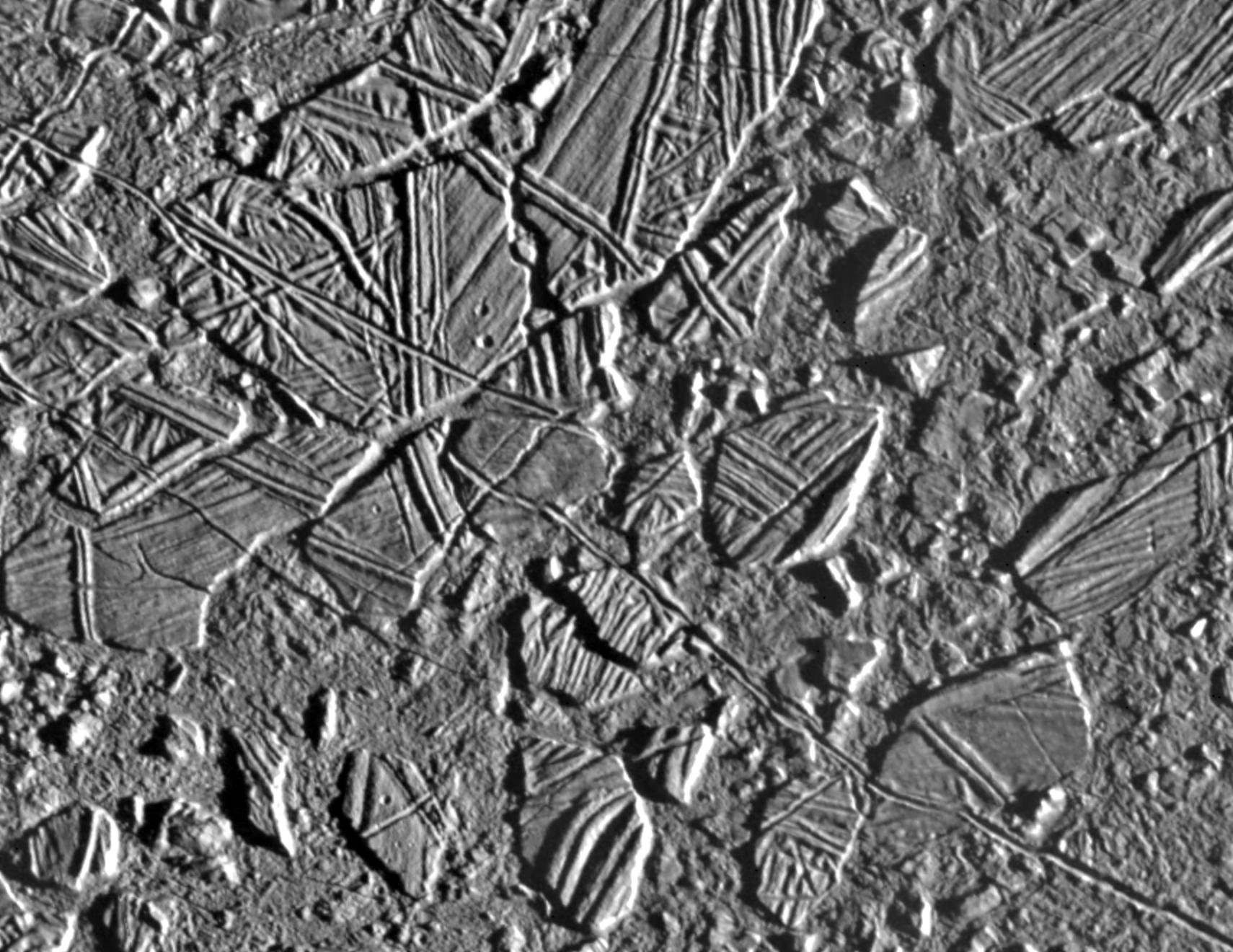
"Ice rafts" in Conamara Chaos

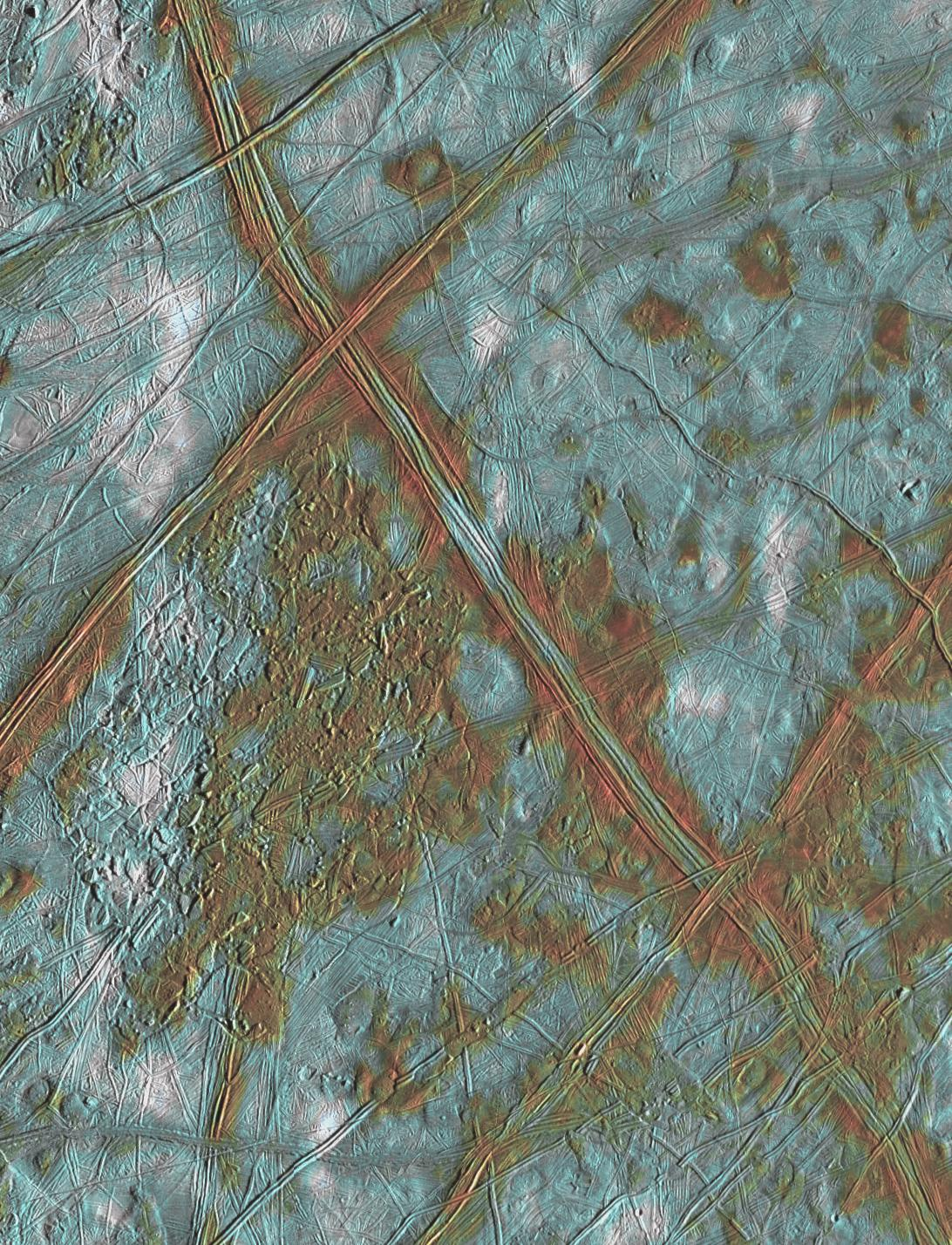
Enhanced-color regional view of Conamara Chaos, showing its location south of the intersection of two large "tripleband" lineae. White areas are ejecta rays from the large (26-km diameter) crater Pwyll 1000 km to the south

Conamara Chaos is a region of chaotic terrain on Jupiter's moon Europa. It is named after Connemara (Irish: Conamara) in Ireland due to its similarly rugged landscape.

Conamara Chaos is a landscape produced by the disruption of the icy crust of Europa. The region consists of rafts of ice that have moved around and rotated. Surrounding these plates is a lower matrix of jumbled ice blocks which may have been formed as water, slush, or warm ice rose up from below the surface. The region is cited as evidence for a liquid ocean below Europa's icy surface.

== Observation and naming ==
In 1979, Europa was visited by the two Voyager spacecraft—Voyager 1 and Voyager 2—which returned detailed images of Europa for the first time. Images of Europa's surface by the Voyager probes led scientists to divide its surface into lineated bright plains and mottled terrain. Later, in 1996, the Galileo orbiter began close observations of Europa and its surface. Higher resolution imagery revealed that many regions of mottled terrain are composed of chaotic, polygonal blocks termed chaos terrain. Conarama Chaos was imaged on Galileo's E6 orbit on 20 February 1997 at a resolution of up to 54 metres (177 ft) per pixel, and images at a resolution of up to 20 metres (66 ft) per pixel were taken on 16 December 1997.

Conamara Chaos is named after Connemara, a rugged region in western Ireland named after Conmac. The name was adopted by the International Astronomical Union's (IAU) Working Group for Planetary Systems Nomenclature (WGPSN) in a meeting held on 20 August 1997, during which the descriptor term Chaos was also introduced.
