= Gorumna =

Island on the Galway coast of Ireland

Native name: Garmna
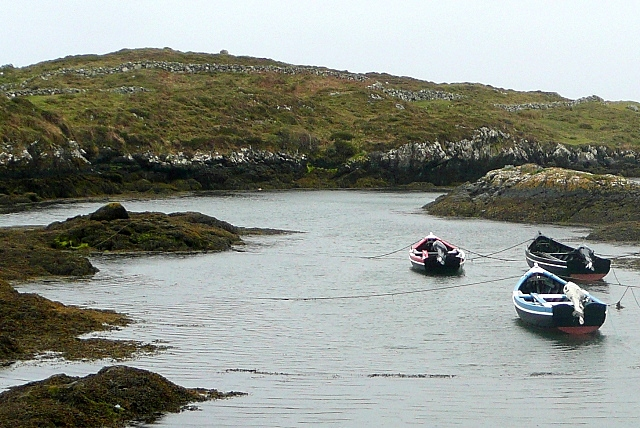
- Droim Quay at south end of Gorumna

- Location within island of Ireland

Geography
- Location: Atlantic Ocean
- Coordinates: 53.25°N 9.68°W

Administration
- Ireland
- Province: Connacht
- County: Galway

Demographics
- Population: 1,044 (2022)

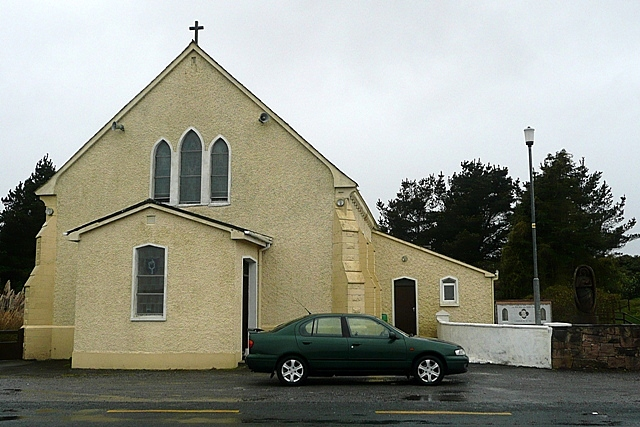
Séipéal Mhuire Gan Smál, on the outskirts of Tír an Fhia (Teeranea).

Gorumna (Irish: Garmna) is an island on the southwest coast of County Galway in Ireland.

== Geography ==
Gorumna is accessible from Lettermore through the R374 road and the Carraig an Logáin bridge. Much like the rest of Connemara, Gorumna has a hilly, blanket bog-esque landscape, with large expanses of rocky terrain and an abundance of furze. The island bears multiple lakes, and several townlands.

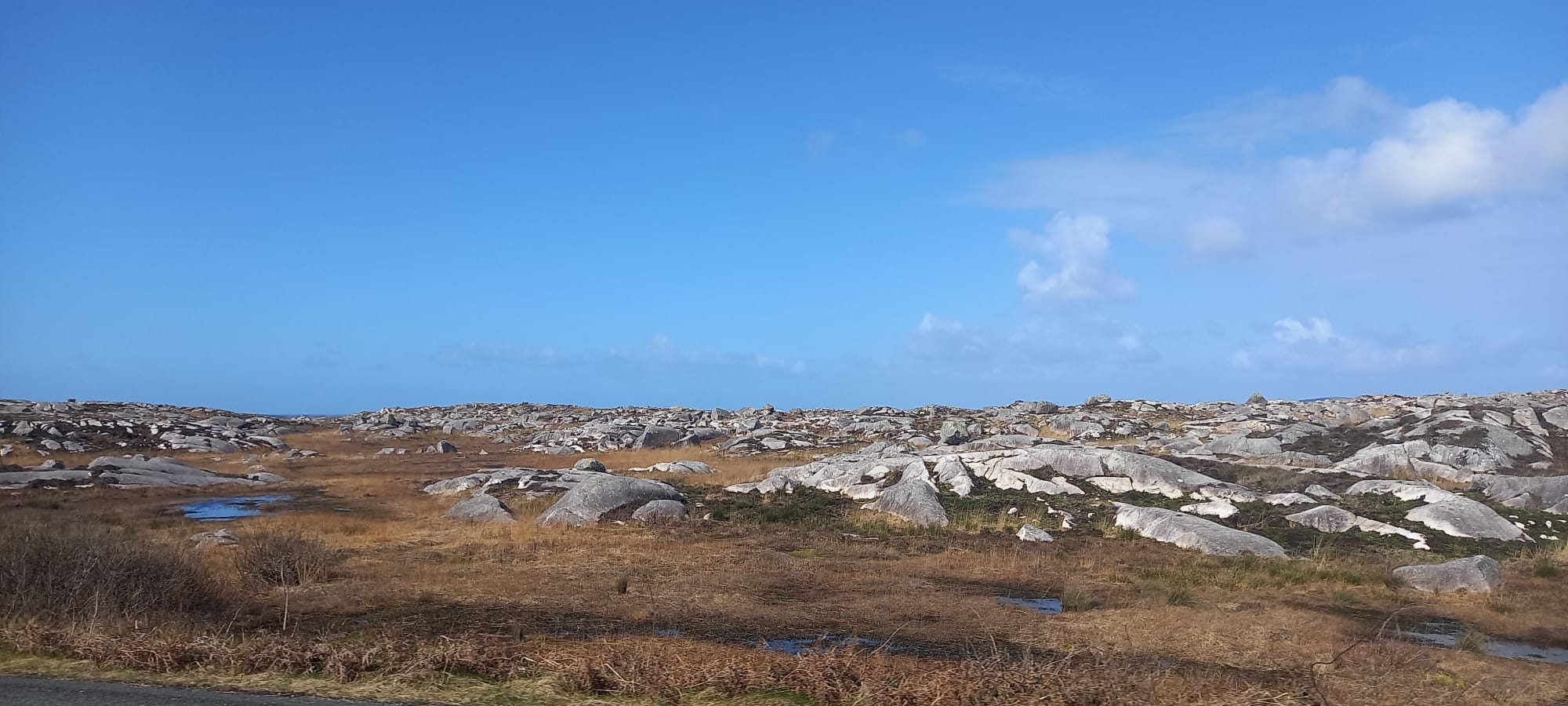
The landscape of central Gorumna.

=== Geology ===
Gorumna is mostly underlain by intrusive Devonian-aged Galway Granite that formed from crustal melting as a result of the Caledonian Orogeny in the late Silurian. Its southern tip also includes Ordovician-aged bedrock of sedimentary marine rocks and basalt.

== Music ==
During the 1860s in South Boston, Massachusetts, Bríd Ní Mháille, an immigrant from the Gorumna village of Trá Bhán, composed the Irish-language caoine, Amhrán na Trá Bháine, which is about the drowning of her three brothers, whose currach was rammed and sunk while they were out at sea. Ní Mháille's lament for her brothers was first performed at a céilí in South Boston before being brought back to her native district in Connemara, where it continues to be passed down as both a work of oral poetry and as a very popular song among performers and fans of Irish traditional music.

== Population ==
The table below reports data on Gorumna Island's population taken from Discover the Islands of Ireland (Alex Ritsema, Collins Press, 1999) and the census of Ireland.

Historical population

Year	Pop.	±%
1841	1,910	—
1851	1,064	−44.3%
1861	1,109	+4.2%
1871	1,417	+27.8%
1881	1,798	+26.9%
1891	1,706	−5.1%
1901	1,620	−5.0%
1911	1,540	−4.9%
1926	1,451	−5.8%

Year	Pop.	±%
1936	1,363	−6.1%
1946	1,418	+4.0%
1951	1,440	+1.6%
1956	1,412	−1.9%
1961	1,334	−5.5%
1966	1,211	−9.2%
1971	1,108	−8.5%
1979	1,122	+1.3%
1981	1,120	−0.2%

Year	Pop.	±%
1986	1,080	−3.6%
1991	1,082	+0.2%
1996	1,057	−2.3%
2002	1,015	−4.0%
2006	1,010	−0.5%
2011	1,055	+4.5%
2016	1,019	−3.4%
2022	1,044	+2.5%

Source: Central Statistics Office. "CNA17: Population by Off Shore Island, Sex and Year". CSO.ie.
