= Micheál Mac Suibhne =

Mícheál or Micheál Mac Suibhne (c. 1760–1820) was an Irish language bard from the Connemara Gaeltacht and an important figure to Modern literature in Irish.

== Life ==
Mac Suibhne was born near the ruined Abbey of Cong, then part of County Galway, but now in County Mayo. The names of his parents are not recorded, but his ancestors are said to have migrated from Ulster as refugees from the Cromwellian conquest of Ireland.

He spent most of his life in Connemara and is said to have been a heavy drinker. Micheál Mac Suibhne and his brother Toirdhealbhach are said to have moved to the parish of Ballinakill, between Letterfrack and Clifden, where the poet was employed as a blacksmith by an Anglo-Irish landlord named Steward.

He is most associated, however, with the town of Cleggan. All of his poems and sean-nós songs were composed in Connacht Irish, which was his native tongue.

It is not known whether Mac Suibhne ever married, but he is believed to have died at Fahy, near Clifden, around the year 1820. His burial place, however, remains unknown.

== Legacy ==
In 1846, James Hardiman wrote of him: "In this district (Doon, Omey Island, Clifden) there lately lived a neglected poetical genius, whose name was Michael Mac Sweeney, who, though held in high repute by his countrymen, was suffered to die in poverty; but this, it is said, often occurs in half-civilized communities, where pride and ignorance are generally prevalent. By the English-speaking portion of the people, Mac Sweeney was the 'Bard of the West.' He composed, in his native language, several poems and songs of considerable merit; which have become such favourites, that there are few who cannot repeat some of them from memory. Many of these have been collected by the Editor; and if space shall permit, one or more of the most popular will be inserted in the Additional Notes, as a specimen of modern Irish versification, and of those compositions which afford so much social pleasure to the good people of Iar-Connacht."

=== Collectors ===
In the Additional Notes to Iar or West Connacht (1846), Hardiman included the full version of Abhrán an Phúca, the Banais Pheigi Ní Eaghra ("The Connemara Wedding"), and Eóghain Cóir by Mac Suibhne.

Following the Irish War of Independence, Professor Tomas Ó Maille collected, edited, and published all of Micheál Mac Suibhne's poems in 1934.

=== Relatives ===
The Bard's brother, Toirealfhach, also composed poetry in Irish, but none of his compositions survive. Toirealfhach had a son, Johnnie Terry Mac Suibhne, who resided at Newtown, Cleggan. Johnnie's son, Séamus Mac Suibhne, wrote songs in English, including The Bogs of Léana Mór.

== Bibliography ==
- County Mayo in Gaelic Folksong, Brian O'Rourke, pp. 173–74, in Mayo:Aspects of its Heritage, edited by Bernard O'Hara, 1982.
- Mícheál Mac Suibhne, agus Filidh an tSéibhe, by Tomas Ó Maille, Dublin, Foils. an Rialtais, 1934
- Galway Authors, Helen Maher, 1976
