= Kathleen Villiers-Tuthill =

Irish historical writer

Kathleen Villiers-Tuthill is an Irish historical writer.

Born and raised in Clifden, County Galway, Villiers-Tuthill is the author of six books and numerous articles on the history of Connemara and County Galway. In recognition of her contribution to the heritage of the county, she has received two Heritage Award from Galway County Council. The first in 2003 and in 2006 her book, Alexander Nimmo & The Western District, was granted Best Heritage Publication Award. Her latest book, A Colony of Strangers: The Founding and Early History of Clifden, was published in 2012. She is married with two sons.

== Bibliography ==
- History of Clifden 1810–1860, 1982
- Beyond The Twelve Bens: A History of Clifden and District 1860–1923,1986. ISBN 0 9530455 1 X
- Patient Endurance: The Great Famine in Connemara, 1997
- History of Kylemore Castle & Abbey, 2003
- Alexander Nimmo & the Western District, 2006
- A Colony of Strangers: The founding and early history of Clifden, 2012. ISBN 978-0-9530455-6-3
