= Oorid Lough =

Lake in County Galway, Ireland

- Loch Úraid (Irish)
- Location in Ireland
- Location: County Galway
- Coordinates: 53°27′13″N 9°37′2″W
- Catchment area: 7.4 km^{2} (2.9 sq mi)
- Basin countries: Ireland
- Max. length: 1.9 km (1.2 mi)
- Max. width: 0.8 km (0.5 mi)
- Surface area: 0.61 km^{2} (0.24 sq mi)
- Surface elevation: 45 m (148 ft)
- Islands: 2

Oorid Lough (Irish: Loch Úraid) is a freshwater lake in the west of Ireland. It is located in the Connemara area of County Galway.

== Geography and natural history ==
Oorid Lough is located along the N59 road about 20 km (12 mi) west of Oughterard, and about 5 km (3 mi) west of the village of Maam Cross. The lake is part of the Connemara Bog Complex Special Area of Conservation.

== See also ==
- List of loughs in Ireland
