= Muiris Sionóid =

Irish academic and literary translator

Muiris Sionóid is an Irish academic and literary translator. He is best known for translating all 154 of William Shakespeare's sonnets from Elizabethan English into the Irish language. A volume of his complete translations was published in 2009 under the title Rotha Mór an Ghrá ("The Great Wheel of Love").

In an article about his translations, Sionóid wrote that Irish poetic forms are completely different from those of other languages and that both the sonnet form and the iambic pentameter line had long been considered "entirely unsuitable" for composing poetry in Irish. In his translations, Soinóid chose to closely reproduce Shakespeare's rhyme scheme and rhythms while rendering into Irish.
