= Derbfine =

Early Irish patrilineal social system

The derbfine (English: /ˌdɛrɪˈviːni/ DERR-iv-EE-nee; Irish: dearbhfhine [ˌdʲaɾˠəˈvʲɪnʲə], from derb 'real' + fine 'group of persons of the same family or kindred', thus literally 'true kin') was a term for patrilineal groups and power structures defined in the first written tracts in early Irish law. Its principal purpose was as an institution of property inheritance, with property redistributed on the death of a member to those remaining members of the derbfine. Comprising all the patrilineal descendants over a four-generation group with a common great-grandfather, it gradually gave way to a smaller three-generation kinship group, called the gelfine.

Within a clan, on the death of its chief or king, the surviving members of its derbfine would elect from their number a new chief and/or elect his successor, or Tánaiste (in English, his Tanist). A larger number of clan members, either allies or cousins who were too distantly related to be members of the derbfine, would not have a direct say in such an election. The frequent recitations of a clan's genealogy by its bards was therefore a reminder of who was currently in or out of the clan's derbfine as much as it was a claim to ancient lineages.

Professor Francis John Byrne of University College Dublin also identified an indfine system used in some clans before the year 1000, with membership going back to a common great-great-great-grandfather, perhaps necessary at a time of frequent warfare.

In a broader European context, membership of a derbfine was similar to holding the rank of prince du sang in France.

== Comparable systems ==
In later Anglo-Saxon England, princes of the royal dynasty who were eligible for the kingship were known as æthelings (eg. Edgar Atheling). In Wales, an edling was the term for an accepted heir apparent of a reigning Welsh monarch.

The inheritance of the Norman royal line on the death of Stephen, King of England and his succession by his cousin, Henry II, is similar. Stephen's son was disinherited by consent, and Henry was chosen as the equivalent of tánaiste or next chieftain and succeeded to the English throne in 1154. The system was again attempted during the incapacity of Henry VI of England, when the House of York obtained the support of some royal cousins to take the throne in 1461. By then, the norm in Europe was the system of primogeniture, which led on to the turbulent succession crises and policies of Henry VIII of England in 1527–36.

== See also ==
- Appanage
- Earl of Tyrone
- Surrender and regrant
